= 1994 in South Africa =

- Decades: 1970s; 1980s; 1990s; 2000s; 2010s
- See also: 1994 in South African sport; List of years in South Africa

1994 in South Africa saw the transition from South Africa's National Party government who had ruled the country since 1948 and had advocated the apartheid system for most of its history, to the African National Congress (ANC) who had been outlawed in South Africa since the 1950s for its opposition to apartheid. The ANC won a majority in the first multiracial election held under universal suffrage. Previously, only white people were allowed to vote. There were some incidents of violence in the Bantustans leading up to the elections as some leaders of the Bantusans opposed participation in the elections, while other citizens wanted to vote and become part of South Africa. There were also bombings aimed at both the African National Congress and the National Party and politically-motivated murders of leaders of the opposing ANC and Inkatha Freedom Party (IFP).

During this time, South Africa was re-admitted into the United Nations and the International Olympic Committee lifted its ban on South Africa participating in the Olympic Games. The elections took place on 27 April and Nelson Mandela was sworn in as president on 10 May.

== Incumbents ==
- State President: F.W. de Klerk (until 9 May).
- President: Nelson Mandela (from 10 May).
- Deputy President: F.W. de Klerk along with Thabo Mbeki (starting 10 May).
- Chief Justice: Michael Corbett.

=== Cabinet ===
The Cabinet, together with the President and the Deputy President, forms part of the Executive.

=== Provincial Premiers ===
- Eastern Cape Province: Raymond Mhlaba (since 7 May)
- Free State Province: Mosiuoa Lekota (since 7 May)
- Gauteng Province: Tokyo Sexwale (since 7 May)
- KwaZulu-Natal Province: Frank Mdlalose (since 7 May)
- Limpopo Province: Ngoako Ramathlodi (since 7 May)
- Mpumalanga Province: Mathews Phosa (since 7 May)
- North West Province: Popo Molefe (since 7 May)
- Northern Cape Province: Manne Dipico (since 7 May)
- Western Cape Province: Hernus Kriel (since 7 May)

== Events ==
February

- 28 – At midnight Walvis Bay and the Penguin Islands is officially handed over to Namibia.
- Bophuthatswana public servants go on strike.

March

- 1 – African National Congress president Nelson Mandela and Inkatha Freedom Party leader Chief Mangosuthu Buthelezi meet in Durban.
- 5 – Weapons are stolen from the South African Air Force's 10 Air Depot at Voortrekkerhoogte.
- 7 – President Lucas Mangope of Bophuthatswana declares that the homelands will not be registering for the April elections. Unrest breaks out and the Bophuthatswana Defence Force is called in.
- 7 – The Transitional Executive Council's law and order subcouncil recommends that Section 29 of the Internal Security Act and Section 206 of the Criminal Procedure Act be repealed immediately.
- 8 – The closing date for submission of designs for South Africa's new national flag.
- 8 – The Transitional Executive Council threatens strong action against the Bophuthatswana government.
- 9 – The Nokia 2110 mobile phone is launched in South Africa at a price of R4,199.
- 9 – Three people are killed and about forty are injured when police officers open fire on demonstrators in Mmabatho, Bophuthatswana.
- 9 – Bophuthatswana President Lucas Mangope rejects the Independent Electoral Commission chairman Judge Johann Kriegler's plea for free political activity in the homeland.
- 9 – The staff of the Bophuthatswana Broadcasting Corporation is fired and the two television stations and three radio stations are closed down.
- 9 – The Inkatha Freedom Party and Freedom Front fail to submit their candidates' lists to the Independent Electoral Commission's offices in Johannesburg by the 16:30 deadline.
- 10 – President Lucas Mangope flees from Mmabatho to Sun City.
- 10 – The Inkatha Freedom Party's central committee meets in Ulundi and decide against participation in the April election.
- 11 – Three wounded Afrikaner Weerstandsbeweging (AWB) members are murdered by a Bophuthatswana Defence Force soldier.
- 11 – South African Defence Force troops move into Bophuthatswana to protect the South African embassy.
- 11 – The Freedom Front submits their list of candidates, but the Inkatha Freedom Party fails to meet the Independent Electoral Commission's new cut-off.
- 12 – Dr. Tjaart van der Walt is appointed as Bophuthatswana's new administrator.
- 15 – Nelson Mandela and Professor Itumeleng Mosala, president of the Azanian People's Organisation, address separate rallies in Mmabatho.
- 15 – South Africa's new national flag, designed by State Heraldist Fred Brownell, is unveiled.
- 16 – State President FW de Klerk announces that the government had made a number of contingency plans to prevent the right-wing from attempting to take over authority over towns as part of their resistance against the new constitution.
- 16 – Ciskei's government agrees to pay pension benefits to public servants who threatened "Bophuthatswana-style action" if their demands were not met.
- 18 – Zulu King Goodwill Zwelithini suggests that the Zululand region is on the point of a unilateral declaration of independence.
- 21 – The Inkatha Freedom Party rejects an initiative by President De Klerk to bring it into the election and starts planning a campaign of opposition to the Interim Constitution and April's election.
- 21 – Prisoners begin nationwide protests for the right to vote.
- 21 – Twenty-one prisoners are killed in a cell fire at the Queenstown Prison.
- 21 – About 2,000 prisoners break out of their cells and toyi-toyi in the courtyards at Pietermaritzburg Prison.
- 21 – 3,000 prisoners go on hunger strike, including 614 at East London, 29 at Krugersdorp, 148 at Port Shepstone, 16 at Pollsmoor (Cape Town) and 210 at Brandvlei.
- 21 – A bomb explodes at the offices of the National Party in the right-wing town of Ventersdorp.
- 22 – Ciskei military leader Brigadier Oupa Gqozo resigns.
- 24 – State President F.W de Klerk states that South African Defence Force troops could be deployed in KwaZulu-Natal.
- 26 – Right-wingers march in Pretoria in a show of strength and the Afrikaner Volkstaat and Conservative Party leader Ferdi Hartzenberg addresses the marchers at Church Square.
- 26 – KwaZulu Chief Minister Mangosuthu Buthelezi meets State President F.W de Klerk for talks about contingency planning for strife-torn KwaZulu-Natal.
- 26 – The home of African National Congress regional premier candidate Jacob Zuma is torched by a mob in Nxamalala, near Nkandla, in northern KwaZulu-Natal.
- 27 – Disgruntled nuclear and rocket scientists threaten to expose South Africa's closely guarded secrets about the arms programme unless they are paid RM4.5 in retrenchment benefits.
- 27 – South Africa is readmitted to the Olympic Games by the International Olympic Committee.
- 28 – More than thirty people are killed and hundreds injured in battles in the Johannesburg area as tens of thousands of Zulus converge on the city centre to demonstrate their support for King Goodwill Zwelithini.
- 28 – The Shell House massacre occurs when security guards at Shell House, the African National Congress HQ in Jeppe Street, Johannesburg, open fire on demonstrators.
- 28 – More than 200 people are arrested in Phuthaditjhaba, QwaQwa after a march by thousands of public servants on the homeland's parliament deteriorated into violence and South African Defence Force troops are sent in.
- 29 – Mangosuthu Buthelezi states that the Inkatha Freedom Party will fight the African National Congress "to the finish" unless the elections are postponed.
- 29 – The Transitional Executive Council recommends emergency measures in KwaZulu-Natal.

April

- 1 – A state of emergency is declared in KwaZulu-Natal.
- 6 – A joint committee consisting of the Independent Electoral Commission, KwaZulu and the South African Government concludes that elections would be impossible in KwaZulu under present conditions.
- 8 – A meeting between the African National Congress president Nelson Mandela, King Goodwill Zwelithini, State President FW de Klerk and Chief Mangosuthu Buthelezi, chief minister of KwaZulu takes place at a secret venue.
- 14 – International mediation fails to break the constitutional deadlock between the African National Congress and Inkatha Freedom Party.
- 14 – A television debate between F.W de Klerk and Nelson Mandela results in no clear winner.
- 14 – Lesotho's Deputy Prime Minister, Selometsi Baholo, is shot dead by dissident soldiers during an apparent kidnapping attempt.
- 15 – Five days of intensive meetings between Mangosuthu Buthelezi, F.W de Klerk and Nelson Mandela start with the Kenyan roving ambassador Professor Washington Okumu brokering the negotiations.
- 18 – The Star's photographer, Ken Oosterbroek, is among several people killed during a firefight between hostel dwellers and National Peacekeeping Force troops in Thokoza.
- 19 – Inkatha Freedom Party agrees to contest the first nonracial elections, to be held in a week's time.
- 20 – Nkosi Sikelel' iAfrika is officially recognised alongside Die Stem van Suid-Afrika as the National Anthems
- 24 – Nine people are killed and 92 injured in central Johannesburg when a 90kg car bomb explodes just before 10am on the corner of Bree and Von Wielligh Streets outside the African National Congress regional and national headquarters.
- 25 – A bomb explodes at a taxi rank near the Randfontein station, with no injuries.
- 27 - The first democratic elections take place and the African National Congress wins.
- 27 – South Africa adopts its present multi-coloured flag as the new national flag.
- South Africa establishes a Consulate-General in Mumbai, India.
- India establishes a High Commission in Pretoria and opens a second Consulate-General in Durban.

May

- 3 – South Africa resumes full membership of the World Health Organization.
- 5 – Bill Clinton, President of the United States, announces the doubling of $600,000,000 of United States foreign aid to South Africa over the next three years.
- 6 – South Africa establishes diplomatic relations with Ghana, Mali and Senegal.
- 10 – Nelson Mandela is sworn in as the first post-apartheid President of South Africa and FW de Klerk and Thabo Mbeki become joint deputy presidents.
- 25 – The United Nations lifts its arms embargo on South Africa.

June

- 1 – the Republic of South Africa returns to the Commonwealth of Nations as a republic in the Commonwealth of Nations.
- 23 – The General Assembly of the United Nations Organisations recalls resolution 48/258A and invites South Africa back into the organisation.

August

- 22 – South Africa and India sign a trade agreement.

November

- Anne, Princess Royal, visits South Africa.

December

- 17-22 – The African National Congress holds their 49th National Conference in Bloemfontein.

Unknown date

- Trevor Manuel is selected by the World Economic Forum as a "Global Leader for Tomorrow".

== Births ==
- 10 January – Justin Basson, rugby union player
- 22 January – Thulisile Phongolo, actress
- 15 February – Jesse Kriel, rugby union player
- 11 March – Handré Pollard, rugby union player
- 25 March – Babes Wodumo, recording artist & choreographer
- 6 May – Johanna Snyman, lawn bowler
- 13 May – Percy Tau, football player
- 13 August – Julia Vincent, diver
- 19 August – Tamaryn Green, Miss South Africa 2018
- 26 August – Aphiwe Dyantyi, rugby player
- 14 September – Michelle Mosalakae, actress, first person with albinism to be made an ambassador for international cosmetic giant Revlon.
- 17 September – Lebohang Maboe, football player
- 2 October – Shekhinah, singer
- 4 October – Aiden Markram, cricketer
- 16 December – MaWhoo, musician, songwriter & model
- 18 December – Thabang Molaba, actor
- 30 December – Faith Nketsi, influencer, model & TV personality

== Deaths ==
- 9 February – Sabelo Phama, revolutionary (b. 1949)
- 18 April – Ken Oosterbroek, photojournalist and member of the Bang-Bang Club (b. 1962)
- 9 May – Elias Motsoaledi, political activist (b. 1924)
- 27 July – Kevin Carter, photojournalist and member of the Bang-Bang Club (b. 1960)
- 28 August – David Wright, poet (b. 1920)
- 25 September – Thomas Nkobi, politician, (b. 1922)
- 5 November – Johan Heyns, theologian (b. 1928)
- 15 November - Oscar Mpetha, political activist (b. 1909)

== Railways ==
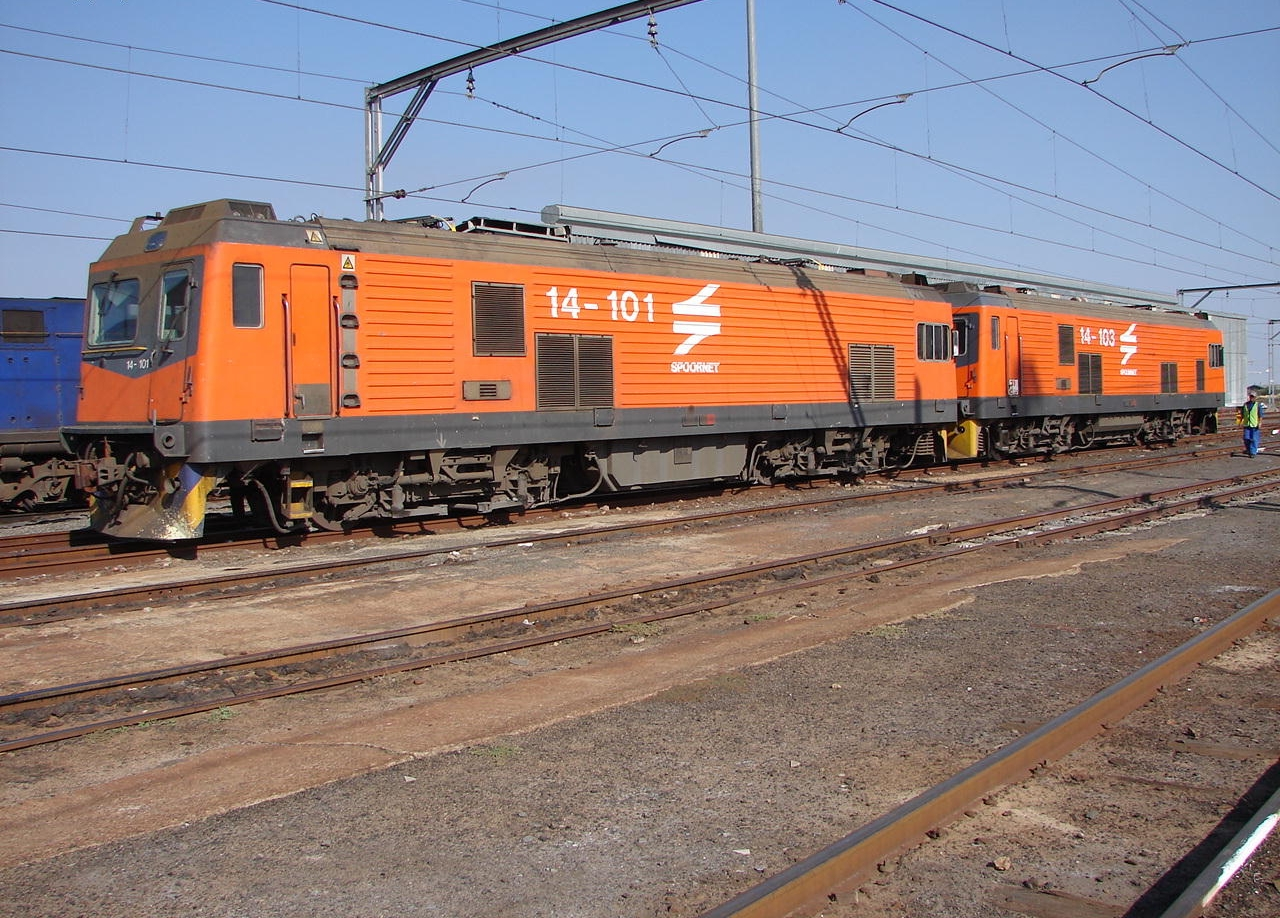
Class 14E1

=== Locomotives ===
- December – Spoornet takes delivery of the last of ten locally manufactured Class 14E1 dual voltage mainline electric locomotives.

== Sports ==
- 18–22 August – A South African team competes in the 1994 Commonwealth Games, the first appearance of a South African team since the 1958 British Empire and Commonwealth Games.
