= 1999 in South Africa =

- Decades: 1970s; 1980s; 1990s; 2000s; 2010s
- See also: 1999 in South African sport; List of years in South Africa

The following lists events that happened during 1999 in South Africa.

== Incumbents ==
- President:
  - Nelson Mandela (until 16 June).
  - Thabo Mbeki (from 16 June).
- Deputy President: Thabo Mbeki (until 16 June), Jacob Zuma (starting 16 June).
- Chief Justice: Ismail Mahomed.

=== Cabinet ===
The Cabinet, together with the President and the Deputy President, forms part of the Executive.

=== Provincial Premiers ===
- Eastern Cape Province: Makhenkesi Stofile
- Free State Province: Ivy Matsepe-Casaburri (until 15 June), Winkie Direko (since 15 June)
- Gauteng Province: Mathole Motshekga (until 15 June), Mbhazima Shilowa (since 15 June)
- KwaZulu-Natal Province: Ben Ngubane (until 10 February), Lionel Mtshali (since 10 February)
- Limpopo Province: Ngoako Ramathlodi
- Mpumalanga Province: Mathews Phosa (until 15 June), Ndaweni Mahlangu (since 15 June)
- North West Province: Popo Molefe
- Northern Cape Province: Manne Dipico
- Western Cape Province: Gerald Morkel

== Events ==
January

- 14 – South African Police Service Captain Bennie Lategan who was investigating People Against Gangsterism and Drugs (PAGAD) is killed in a drive-by-shooting in Cape Town.
- 27 – Controversial youth drama series, Yizo Yizo debuts on SABC 1.

March

- 20 – The Azanian People's Liberation Army (APLA), the military wing of the Pan Africanist Congress (PAC), disbands.
- 24 – Allan Boesak, former Director of the Foundation for Peace and Justice, is sentenced to 8 years in prison for fraud.
- 31 – The Durban High Court finds Sipho Thwala guilty of 16 murders and 10 rapes and sentences him to 506 years in prison.

April

- 20 – Judge Edwin Cameron, high court judge and human rights advocate, announces that he is HIV positive.
- 23 – Makhaya Ntini, cricketer, is found guilty of raping a student.

May

- 29 – Cathy O'Dowd becomes the first woman to summit Mount Everest from both the north and south sides.

June

- 2 – The second democratic elections take place and is won by the African National Congress.
- 10 – George Bizos is awarded the Order for Meritorious Service, Class II, by President Nelson Mandela.
- 16 – Thabo Mbeki becomes the second President of South Africa.
- Watershed are signed to EMI Music South Africa and begin recording their first album In the Meantime.

September

- 2 – A South African Air Force Alouette III helicopter crashes near Port Elizabeth, killing pilot Major K.A. Newman and seriously injuring two crew members.
- 10–19 – The All-Africa Games take place in Johannesburg.

October

- 22 – Henry Navigator, a 13,000 ton Cyprus bulk carrier, sinks off Bok Point about 35 km north of Cape Town.
- 23 – A South African Air Force Oryx helicopter crashes near Kroonstad, killing 10 people and injuring 14 others.
- Queen Elizabeth II and The Duke of Edinburgh visit South Africa.
- The Greater St. Lucia Wetland Park is declared a UNESCO World Heritage Site.

November

- 15 – Afrikaans language television channel kykNET is launched.

December

- 3 – Government signs the final purchasing agreement in the arms deal and the loan agreement to pay for the equipment is signed by Finance Minister Trevor Manuel.

Unknown Date

- Statistics South Africa conducts a Survey of Activities of Young People.

== Births ==
- 25 January - Ndavi Nokeri, Miss South Africa 2022
- 16 February – Chloe Meecham, water polo player
- 20 February - Boohle, singer
- 3 March - Sphephelo Sithole, soccer player
- 2 April – Elaine, singer and songwriter
- 26 April - Laura Wolvaardt, cricket player
- 22 May - Bongeka Gamede, soccer player
- 11 June - Paballo Mavundla, actor
- 29 November - Kamo Mphela, dancer and singer
- Masego Kgomo, muti murder victim. (d. 2009)

== Deaths ==
- 10 January – Gavin Relly, businessman and Chairman of Anglo American. (b. 1926)
- 26 May – David Millin, 78, movie director, producer, and cinematographer (b. 1920)
- 27 July – Simon "Mahlathini" Nkabinde, mbaqanga singer (b.1938)
- 15 November – Pieter van der Byl, politician (b. 1923)
