= 1997 in South Africa =

- Decades: 1970s; 1980s; 1990s; 2000s; 2010s
- See also: 1997 in South African sport; List of years in South Africa

The following lists events that happened during 1997 in South Africa.

== Incumbents ==
- President: Nelson Mandela.
- Deputy President: Thabo Mbeki.
- Chief Justice: vacant.

=== Cabinet ===
The Cabinet, together with the President and the Deputy President, forms part of the Executive.

=== Provincial Premiers ===
- Eastern Cape Province: Raymond Mhlaba (until 4 February), Makhenkesi Stofile (since 4 February)
- Free State Province: Ivy Matsepe-Casaburri
- Gauteng Province: Tokyo Sexwale
- KwaZulu-Natal Province: Frank Mdlalose (until 1 March), Ben Ngubane (since 1 March)
- Limpopo Province: Ngoako Ramathlodi
- Mpumalanga Province: Mathews Phosa
- North West Province: Popo Molefe
- Northern Cape Province: Manne Dipico
- Western Cape Province: Hernus Kriel

== Events ==
February

- 4 – The Constitution of South Africa comes into effect.

March

- 19 – Denel and Aérospatiale sign a co-operation agreement.
- 28 – President Nelson Mandela and Prime Minister of India H. D. Deve Gowda sign the Red Fort Declaration on a Strategic Partnership during Mandela's state visit to India.

April

- 7 – South African soap opera Muvhango debuts on SABC 2.
- 23 – Eugène Terre'Blanche, Afrikaner Weerstandsbeweging leader, is convicted of attempted murder and assault in the Magistrates Court in Potchefstroom.
- 26 – Winnie Madikizela-Mandela is re-elected as president of the African National Congress's Women's League by 656 votes to 114.

August

- Dirk Coetzee, David Tshikalange and Butana Almond Nofomela, former members of the Vlakplaas counter-insurgency unit, are granted amnesty by the Truth and Reconciliation Commission in respect of the murder of Durban attorney Griffiths Mxenge in November 1981.

October

- 2 – After broadcasting in its homeland for 7 months, the BBC preschool series Teletubbies premieres on South African television for the first time. The series begins on M-Net as part of its children's programming block K-T.V..
- 10 – A combined version of Nkosi Sikelel' iAfrika and Die Stem van Suid-Afrika becomes the National Anthem.
- 30 – The South African National Defence Force announces that it had completed destroying its stock pile of anti-personnel mines.
- South Africa and India sign the terms of reference of the India-South Africa Commercial Alliance and agreements in tourism, geology and mineral resources. The science and technology co-operation program is ratified.

December

- 16–20 – The African National Congress holds its 50th National Conference in Mafikeng.

Unknown Date

- Cabinet and parliamentary approval is announced by Thabo Mbeki of the Defence Review which enables the South African National Defence Force to undertake tenders for R12bn worth of arms equipment.

== Births ==
- 3 January – Zakhele Lepasa, soccer player
- 24 January – Teboho Mokoena (soccer, born 1997), soccer player
- 11 February – Nasty C, rapper, songwriter and record producer
- 24 April – Tiisetso Makhubela, soccer player
- 25 June – Curwin Bosch, rugby player
- 15 July – Manie Libbok, rugby player
- 3 October – Jo-Ane van Dyk, javelin thrower

== Deaths ==
- 16 July — Lydia Lindeque, actor. (b. 1916)
- 25 November — Hastings Banda, the first president of Malawi, dies in Johannesburg (b. 1898)

== Sports ==
=== Athletics ===
- 23 February – Thabiso Moqhali from Lesotho wins the South African title in the men's marathon, clocking 2:15:31 in Pinelands.
