= 2000 in South Africa =

- Decades: 1980s; 1990s; 2000s; 2010s; 2020s
- See also: 2000 in South African sport; List of years in South Africa

The following lists events that happened during 2000 in South Africa.

== Incumbents ==
- President: Thabo Mbeki.
- Deputy President: Jacob Zuma.
- Chief Justice: Ismail Mahomed then vacant.

=== Cabinet ===
The Cabinet, together with the President and the Deputy President, forms part of the Executive.

=== Provincial Premiers ===
- Eastern Cape Province: Makhenkesi Stofile
- Free State Province: Winkie Direko
- Gauteng Province: Mbhazima Shilowa
- KwaZulu-Natal Province: Lionel Mtshali
- Limpopo Province: Ngoako Ramathlodi
- Mpumalanga Province: Ndaweni Mahlangu
- North West Province: Popo Molefe
- Northern Cape Province: Manne Dipico
- Western Cape Province: Gerald Morkel

== Events ==
February

- Tropical Cyclone Eline brings heavy rains to Mozambique, South Africa, Zimbabwe, Botswana, Zambia, Malawi and Madagascar.
- The Mozambican navy begins evacuating people from low ground using rubber boats donated from last year's floods.
- 5 – The first wave of floods hit Mozambique.
- 9 – The South African Air Force airlifts foreign tourists cut off by floodwaters in the Kruger National Park.
- 11 – Mbabane, the capital of Swaziland, is left without drinking water due to flooding.
- 11 – The swollen Limpopo River bursts its banks.
- 11 – Southern Botswana receives 75% of its average annual rainfall in three days.
- 11 – United Nations officials say the lives of 150,000 people are in immediate danger from lack of food and disease.
- 22 – The full force of tropical Cyclone Eline hits the Mozambique coast near Beira, just north of the areas already devastated by the first wave of floods. Winds measure 260 km/h (160 mph).
- 22 – The South African air force sends in 5 helicopters to aid people trapped by floods.
- 24 – The United Nations says $13 million is needed for urgent relief supplies.
- 24 – Mozambique calls for international help and asks for more than $65 million to help rebuild the country's roads, bridges and power supplies.
- 27 – Zimbabwe opens the sluice gates of the Kariba Dam.
- 27 – A wall of water about 2 metres (6 ft) high hits Chokwe and inundate low farmlands around Chokwe and Xai-Xai in Mozambique.

March

- 1 – The first United States Air Force C-17 transport aircraft lands in Maputo.
- 1 – Britain states that it will send in food, medicine, equipment, 77 rubber boats and three HC-1 Puma helicopters to help the South African helicopters.
- 1 – The South African Air Force sends 3 more helicopters to Mozambique.
- 2 – Cyclone Gloria hits the already flooded Mozambique.
- 2 – Aid workers in Mozambique estimate 100,000 people need to be evacuated and around 7,000 are trapped in trees. Many have been there for several days without food and water.
- 2 – Floodwater levels are said to have risen between 4 and 5 metres (more than 26 feet) in five days.
- 5 – Johannes Maremane wins his first national title in the men's marathon, clocking 2:11:15 in Pinelands.
- 15 – The South African rescue workers end their operation in Mozambique.
- 16 – One of South Africa's worst serial killers, Cedric Maake, is convicted of 27 murders as well as multiple armed robberies and rapes. Known as the Wemmer Pan serial killer, after the Johannesburg suburb where most of the murders took place, he is jailed at the High Court for 1,340 years.
- 28 – The Zambezi River is still between 2,5 metres and 3 metres above flood level.
- 28 – Cahora Bassa reduces water discharges.

April

- 4 – South African soap opera 7de Laan debuts on SABC 2.
- 15 – The South African Air Force Museum's Supermarine Spitfire MkIX no. 5553 is destroyed in an emergency landing during an airshow at AFB Swartkop. Pilot Lieutenant Colonel Neil Thomas survives with minor injuries.
- Nicky Boje, Hansie Cronje, Herschelle Gibbs, Pieter Strydom and Henry Williams, along with a number of other international cricket players and Indian bookmakers, are accused by the New Delhi police of cheating, fraud and criminal conspiracy in alleged match fixing.

May

- 19 – President Thabo Mbeki is awarded an honorary doctorate of laws from the Glasgow Caledonian University.

July

- 9–14 – The 13th International AIDS conference is held in Durban, KwaZulu-Natal, the first ever to be held in a developing country.

August

- 21 – A South African Air Force MB-326K Impala Mk II crashes during a routine night training flight. Pilot Lt. Dian Smit is killed.
- 22 – President Thabo Mbeki is voted Newsmaker of the Year by the Pretoria Press Club.

September

- 27 – South Africa and India sign a memorandum of understanding on defence co-operation.

November

- 10 – A memorandum of understanding is signed for the creation of the Gaza-Kruger-Gonarezhou Transfrontier Park.
- 27 – A South African Air Force Atlas Cheetah C crashes on finals to AFB Makhado killing Capt. Piet Koster.
- Prince Philip, Duke of Edinburgh and Prince Edward, Earl of Wessex visit South Africa.

Unknown date

- The Democratic Party joins with the New National Party to form the Democratic Alliance.
- The Gordon Institute of Business Science is established by the University of Pretoria.

== Births ==
- 16 January – Nadine de Klerk, cricket player
- 23 March – Jaden Hendrikse, rugby player
- 11 April – Lwah Ndlunkulu, singer-singwriter
- 20 April – Uyinene Mrwetyana, student and femicide victim
- 30 April – Uncle Waffles, Swazi-born DJ and record producer
- 1 May – Marco Jansen, cricket player
- 5 June – Evidence Makgopa, soccer player
- 27 June – Nonkululeko Mlaba, cricket player
- 18 July – TNS (DJ), DJ and music producer
- 18 July – Nomfundo Moh, singer
- 27 July – Shalate Sekhabi, actress
- 13 September – Azana, singer
- 2 October – Gerald Coetzee, cricket player
- 6 October – Nkosazana Daughter, singer
- 11 October – Noxolo Cesane, soccer player

== Deaths ==
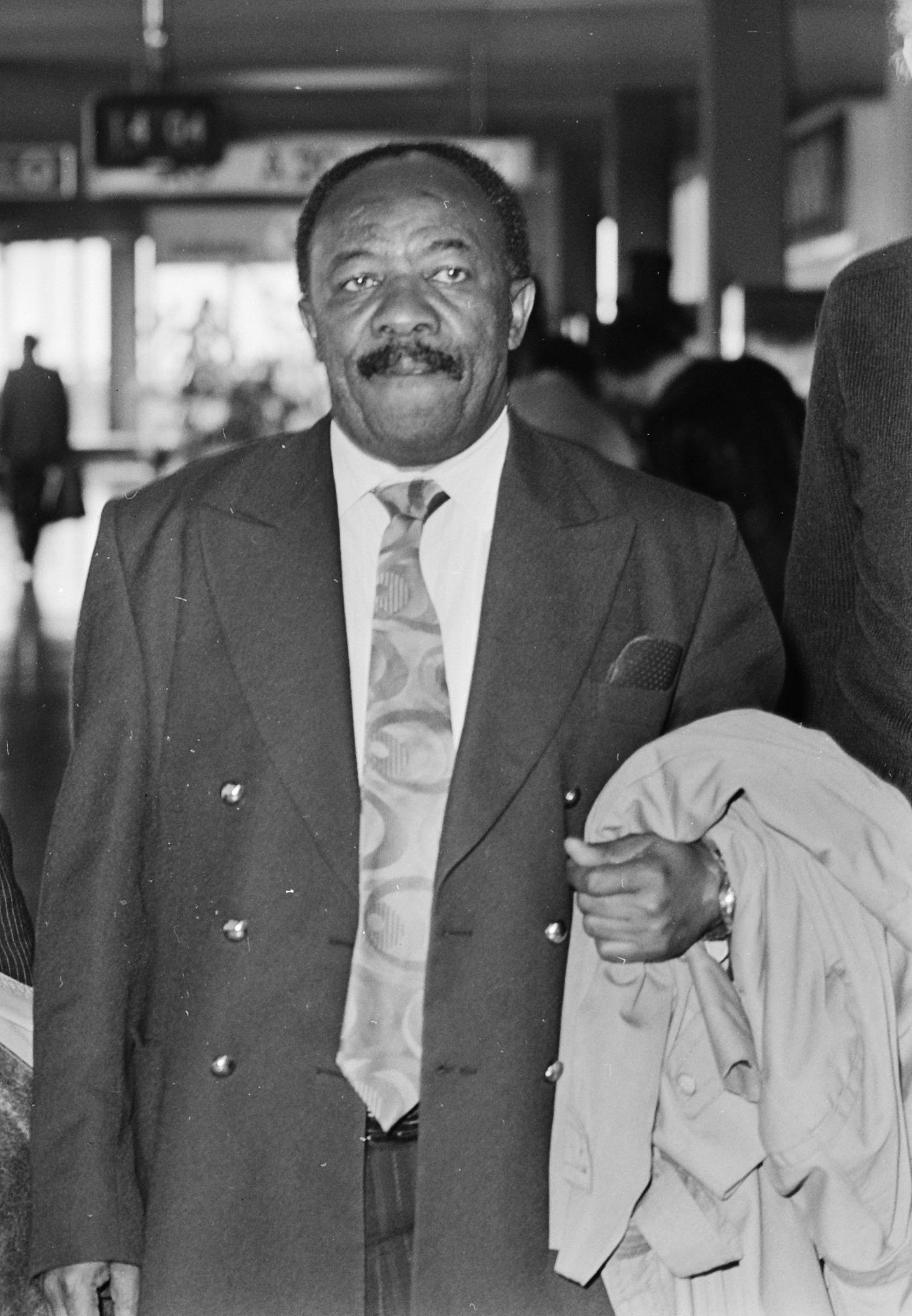
Alfred Nzo

- 13 January – Alfred Nzo, South African political activist. (b. 1925)
- 17 June – Ismail Mahomed, South African and Namibian Chief Justice. (b. 1931)
- 19 June – Mary Benson, activist and author. (b. 1919)
- 20 July – Ray Ntlokwana, actor. (b. 1937)
- 10 November – George Matanzima, Prime Minister of Transkei. (b. 1918)

== Railways ==
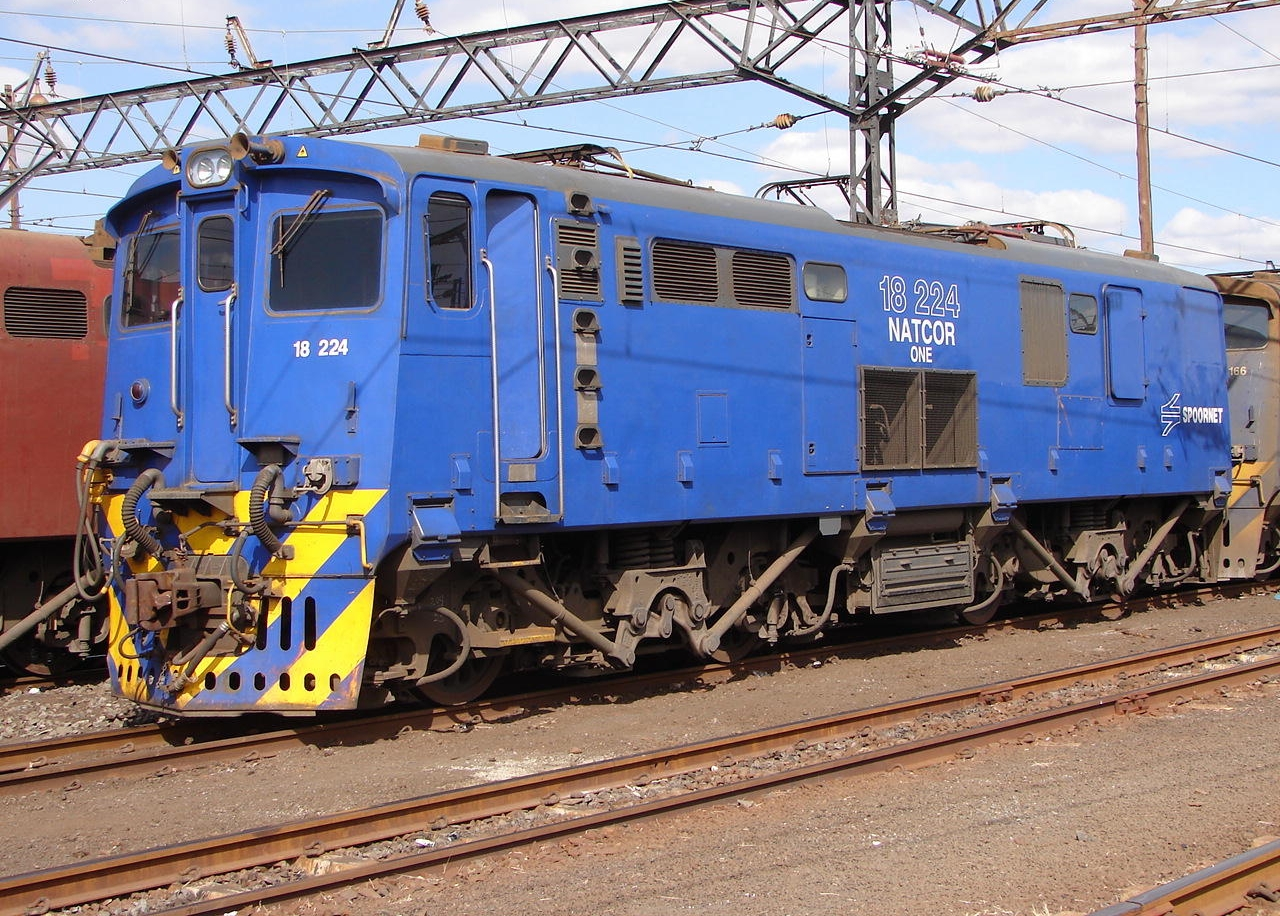
Class 18E, Series 1

- Spoornet embarks on a program to rebuild its Class 6E1, Series 6 to Series 11 locomotives to Class 18E, Series 1 locomotives.
