= 1998 in South Africa =

- Decades: 1970s; 1980s; 1990s; 2000s; 2010s
- See also: 1998 in South African sport; List of years in South Africa

The following events happened in South Africa in the year 1998.

== Incumbents ==
- President: Nelson Mandela.
- Deputy President: Thabo Mbeki.
- Chief Justice: vacant then Ismail Mahomed.

=== Cabinet ===
The Cabinet, together with the President and the Deputy President, forms part of the Executive.

=== Provincial Premiers ===
- Eastern Cape Province: Makhenkesi Stofile
- Free State Province: Ivy Matsepe-Casaburri
- Gauteng Province: Tokyo Sexwale (until 19 January), Mathole Motshekga (since 19 January)
- KwaZulu-Natal Province: Ben Ngubane
- Limpopo Province: Ngoako Ramathlodi
- Mpumalanga Province: Mathews Phosa
- North West Province: Popo Molefe
- Northern Cape Province: Manne Dipico
- Western Cape Province: Hernus Kriel (until 11 May), Gerald Morkel (since 11 May)

== Events ==
January

- 3 – Six policemen from the North East Rand Dog Unit set their dogs on three suspected illegal immigrants, allowing the animals to savage the three men while the officers hurl racial insults.

March

- 9 – Robert McBride, official in the Department of Foreign Affairs, is arrested for gun smuggling by the Mozambican police.
- 18 – A recently restored South African Air Force Museum ex-Rhodesian Air Force Percival Provost Mk 52 crashes. Denel Aviation test pilot Rick Culpan dies from his injuries four days later.
- 21 – The Socialist Party of Azania (SOPA) is founded.

May

- 19 – Voortrekkerhoogte is renamed Thaba Tshwane.

June

- 4 – Ferdi Barnard, Civil Cooperation Bureau member, receives 2 life sentences plus 63 years in prison for the murder of David Webster.

July

- 7 – Theuns Swanepoel, the "Rooi Rus" policeman who gave the order to open fire on Soweto uprising rioters, dies without confessing.
- Highly acclaimed South African Soap opera Isidingo debuts on SABC 3.
- 16 – Bulelani Ngcuka is elected as the first National Director of Public Prosecutions.

August

- 21 – President Nelson Mandela calls for a summit over the Congo conflict, inviting the leaders of the Democratic Republic of the Congo, Rwanda, Uganda and Zimbabwe to attend.
- 25 – A pipe bomb explodes at Cape Town's Victoria & Alfred Waterfront's Planet Hollywood restaurant, seriously injuring 26 people of which two later die in hospital.

September

- 3 – South Africa supports the intervention in the Democratic Republic of the Congo by Namibia, Zimbabwe and Angola in support of Kabila.
- 14 – Robert McBride is conditionally released from prison in Mozambique.
- 16 – A South African Air Force Impala Mk I crashes at AFB Bloemspruit.

October

- 1 – e.tv is launched.
- 9 – The Constitutional Court invalidates the sodomy laws in the case of National Coalition for Gay and Lesbian Equality and Another v Minister of Justice and Others.
- 29 – Nelson Mandela receives the Truth and Reconciliation report.

December

- 10 – South Africa opposes the Congo talks set in Zambia the following week.
- Rock band Watershed is discovered by Sivan Pillay in Times Square, Sandton.

Unknown date

- The Black Tie Ensemble is founded by Mimi Coertse and Neels Hansen.

== Births ==
- 20 February - Gabriela Salgado, soccer player
- 7 May - Damian Willemse, rugby player
- 1 July - Linda Motlhalo, soccer player
- 19 July – Lasizwe Dambuza, media personality
- 2 September – Ama Qamata, actress
- 21 November - Tumi Sekhukhune, cricket player

== Deaths ==
- 22 February – Athol Rowan, cricketer. (b. 1921)
- 22 April – Kitch Christie, Springbok rugby coach. (b. 1940)
- 7 May – Allan McLeod Cormack, physicist and Nobel laureate. (b. 1924)
- 8 June – Jackie McGlew, cricketer. (b. 1929)
- 21 September – Frederick Samuel Modise, leader of IPHC (b. 1914)

== Sports ==
=== Boxing ===
- 5 June – Thulani Malinga, super middleweight boxer, wins the World Boxing Federation (WBF) title.

=== Soccer ===
Bafana Bafana participate in their first ever FIFA World Cup hosted in France, eventually being eliminated in the group stages.

=== Cricket ===
The South Africa national cricket team wins the 1998 ICC KnockOut Trophy (now ICC Champions Trophy), which is the only ICC trophy the country has won till date.
