= 1996 in South Africa =

- Decades: 1970s; 1980s; 1990s; 2000s; 2010s
- See also: 1996 in South African sport; List of years in South Africa

The following lists events that happened during 1996 in South Africa.

== Incumbents ==
- President: Nelson Mandela.
- Deputy President: F.W. de Klerk (until 30 June) along with Thabo Mbeki.
- Chief Justice: Michael Corbett then vacant.

=== Cabinet ===
The Cabinet, together with the President and the Deputy President, forms part of the Executive.

=== Provincial Premiers ===
- Eastern Cape Province: Raymond Mhlaba
- Free State Province: Mosiuoa Lekota (until 18 December), Ivy Matsepe-Casaburri (since 18 December)
- Gauteng Province: Tokyo Sexwale
- KwaZulu-Natal Province: Frank Mdlalose
- Limpopo Province: Ngoako Ramathlodi
- Mpumalanga Province: Mathews Phosa
- North West Province: Popo Molefe
- Northern Cape Province: Manne Dipico
- Western Cape Province: Hernus Kriel

== Events ==
January

- 15 – King Moshoeshoe II of Lesotho is killed in a car accident.

February

- 26 – South Africa and Algeria restore diplomatic ties.
- Prince Philip, Duke of Edinburgh, in his capacity as Grand President of the British Commonwealth Ex-Services League, visits South Africa.

March

- 11 – The trial of General Magnus Malan and 19 co-accused begins in the Durban Supreme Court.
- 19 – President Nelson Mandela is granted a divorce from Winnie Mandela in the Rand Supreme Court.
- 23 – Approximately 6,000 Inkatha Freedom Party supporters armed with fighting sticks, spears, clubs and battle axes rally in the Tugela Ferry area of KwaZulu-Natal in defiance of a national ban on traditional weapons.

April

- 15 – The Truth and Reconciliation Commission begins its formal hearings.

May

- 2 – South Africa and China exchange letters granting each other most-favoured-nation status.
- 8 – South Africa's new constitution is adopted by the Constitutional Assembly.
- 9 – The National Party withdraws from the coalition government, giving the African National Congress full political control.

June

- 19 – Cuban Foreign Minister Roberto Robaina Gonzalez visits South Africa.

July

- Nelson Mandela visits the United Kingdom on a state visit.

August

- 4 – Rashaad Staggie, Hard Livings gang leader, is killed by the vigilante group People Against Gangsterism and Drugs.
- Mimi Coertse receives the highest accolade an artist can receive from the Austrian government, the Oesterreichishe Ehrenkreuz für Wissenschaft und Kunst.

September

- 6 – The Constitutional Court delivers judgment on the new constitution.
- 11 – A mining agreement on wages and working conditions is signed between the Chamber of Mines and the National Union of Mineworkers.

October

- 11 – The constitution is amended by the Constitutional Assembly.
- 30 – Colonel Eugene de Kock of the South African Police is sentenced to 212 years in prison.
- General Magnus Malan and 19 co-accused are acquitted on all charges relating to the massacre of 13 people in KwaMakhuta township south of Durban in 1987.
- The first South African National Census since the end of apartheid is held.

December

- 4 – A number of agreements relating to culture, double taxation, fiscal evasion and a memorandum of understanding relating to defence equipment are signed by Thabo Mbeki, Deputy President of South Africa, on a state visit to India.
- 10 – The new constitution is signed into law.

Unknown date

- Trevor Manuel is appointed Minister of Finance.
- Paraffin Safety Association of Southern Africa is founded.

== Births ==
- 31 January - Master KG, musician & record producer
- 17 February – Sasha Pieterse, actress
- 1 March – Jane de Wet, actress
- 3 March – Andile Phehlukwayo, cricketer
- 5 March – Kirsten Beckett, artistic gymnast
- 29 March – Lungi Ngidi, cricketer
- 22 April – Ilze Hattingh, tennis player
- 22 April – Herschel Jantjies, rugby player
- 26 May – Lara Goodall, cricketer
- 15 June - Gaisang Noge, actress
- 30 June - Makhadzi, singer

== Deaths ==
- 15 January – King Moshoeshoe II of Lesotho. (b. 1938)
- 28 March – Siegfried Mynhardt, actor. (b. 1906)
- 16 December – Laurens van der Post, author and political adviser. (b. 1906)

== Sports ==
Bafana Bafana wins African Cup of Nation that was organized in South Africa by winning 2–0 against Tunisia in the final.

=== Athletics ===
- 25 February – Josia Thugwane wins his second national title in the men's marathon, clocking 2:11:46 in Pinelands.
