= 1995 in South Africa =

- Decades: 1970s; 1980s; 1990s; 2000s; 2010s
- See also: 1995 in South African sport; List of years in South Africa

The following lists events that happened during 1995 in South Africa.

== Incumbents ==
- President: Nelson Mandela.
- Deputy President: F.W. de Klerk along with Thabo Mbeki
- Chief Justice: Michael Corbett.

=== Cabinet ===
The Cabinet, together with the President and the Deputy President, forms part of the Executive.

=== Provincial Premiers ===
- Eastern Cape Province: Raymond Mhlaba
- Free State Province: Mosiuoa Lekota
- Gauteng Province: Tokyo Sexwale
- KwaZulu-Natal Province: Frank Mdlalose
- Limpopo Province: Ngoako Ramathlodi
- Mpumalanga Province: Mathews Phosa
- North West Province: Popo Molefe
- Northern Cape Province: Manne Dipico
- Western Cape Province: Hernus Kriel

== Events ==
January

- 10 – General Johan van der Merwe, Police Commissioner of the South African Police Service, resigns and is succeeded by General George Fivaz.
- 25 – South Africa and India sign a number of agreements relating to political, trade, economic, cultural, scientific and technical co-operation.

March

- 27 – Winnie Mandela is dismissed as deputy minister of Arts, Culture, Science and Technology.
- Elizabeth II and The Duke of Edinburgh visit South Africa.

May

- 10 – The Vaal Reefs mining disaster at Vaal Reefs gold mine in Orkney. A runaway locomotive falls into a lift shaft onto an ascending cage and causes it to plunge 1,500 feet (460 m) to the bottom of the 6,900 feet (2,100 m) deep shaft, killing 104.

June

- 6 – The Constitutional Court abolishes capital punishment in the case of S v Makwanyane and Another.
- 24 – South Africa win the Rugby World Cup over New Zealand with a final score [after extra time] of 15-12.

July

- 19 – The Promotion of National Unity and Reconciliation Act, No. 34 is signed into law by president Nelson Mandela.
- South Africa and India sign an agreement on co-operation in science and technology.

August

- – Serial killer Moses Sithole is arrested for the murders of 38 people.

November

- 29 – Desmond Tutu is appointed chairperson of the 17-member Truth and Reconciliation Commission (TRC) by president Nelson Mandela.

== Births ==
- 8 January – Kyle Edmund, South African-born British tennis player
- 29 January – RG Snyman, rugby player
- 14 March – Arno Greeff, actor
- 19 April – Madrie Le Roux, tennis player
- 5 May – Thomas du Toit, rugby player
- 15 May – Bruce Bvuma, football player
- 20 May – Warrick Gelant, rugby player
- 25 May – Kagiso Rabada, cricketer
- 5 June – Troye Sivan, South African-Australian actor and singer
- 12 June – Claudia Cummins, artistic gymnast
- 28 June – Demi-Leigh Nel-Peters, model, Miss Universe 2017
- 21 July – Armand Joubert, singer-songwriter
- 3 August – Ciara Charteris, South African-British actress
- 5 August – Jean-Luc du Preez, rugby player
- 5 August – Dan du Preez, rugby player
- 6 August – Lynn Kiro, tennis player
- 11 August – Brad Binder, motorcycle racer
- 29 August – Ntando Duma, actress and television personality
- 30 October – Anene Booysen, murder victim (d. 2013)
- 7 November – Cameron Coetzer, badminton player
- 20 December – Aimee van Rooyen, rhythmic gymnast

== Deaths ==
- 6 January – Joe Slovo, activist and politician. (b. 1926)
- 20 June - Harry Gwala, activist and politician. (b. 1920)
- 15 September – Harry Calder, cricketer. (b. 1901)

== Sports ==
=== Rugby ===
- 25 May to 24 June – South Africa hosts the 1995 Rugby World Cup and wins the final game 15–12 against the New Zealand All Blacks.
