= World Leisure Holidays v Georges =

South African legal case

World Leisure Holidays (Pty) Ltd v Georges is an important case in South African contract law, specifically in the area of termination. It was heard in the Witwatersrand Local Division by Cloete J, Blieden J and Malan J on 14 February, 2002, with judgment handed down on 26 February. An appeal from a decision in a magistrate's court, it is the leading case on the issue of temporary supervening impossibility of performance.

Late in 1996, a family booked a holiday in Mauritius, only to find its flight suspended due to a tropical cyclone, and so attempted to cancel its contract with the tour operator and claim damages, on the grounds that the supervening impossibility of performance had brought the contract to an end. The court a quo upheld the claim.

On appeal, however, Cloete J found that temporary impossibility of performance does not of itself bring the contract to an immediate end. Only where the foundation of the contract has been destroyed, or where all or part of the performance is already (or would inevitably become) impossible, is the creditor entitled to regard the contract as having ended.

The test for impossibility has been formulated in a variety of ways, but the court found that it was neither necessary nor desirable to lay down a concrete formula:

The facts in some cases will lend themselves more readily to the application of one test, whereas other cases will more easily be disposed of by the application of another test. In every case a value judgment, based on objective criteria, will be required to establish whether it is just that the bargain should, to the extent still possible, be upheld and the obligations of the parties adjusted. On the one hand, the court should not make a new contract for the parties. On the other hand, neither party should be allowed to escape its obligations where the essence of the contract is still capable of performance.

The appeal was upheld with costs and the magistrate's order set aside.

== See also ==
- South African contract law
