= 1990 in South Africa =

- Decades: 1970s; 1980s; 1990s; 2000s; 2010s
- See also: List of years in South Africa

1990 in South Africa saw the official start of the process of ending Apartheid. President of South Africa, eid. President F.W. de Klerk unbanned organisations that were banned by the government including the African National Congress, the South African Communist Party and the Pan Africanist Congress. The African National Congress, Umkhonto we Sizwe, suspends its armed activity within South Africa. Political prisoners including Nelson Mandela were released. Nelson Mandela met ANC leader Oliver Tambo for the first time in 28 years at a meeting in Sweden. Mandela also traveled to England to thank the people for their support in the campaign to free him. South Africa withdrew its troops from Namibia, which was granted independence. 1990 also saw marches in support and against the formation of a new post-Apartheid South Africa.

== Incumbents ==
- State President: F.W. de Klerk.
- Chief Justice: Pieter Jacobus Rabie then Michael Corbett.

== Events ==
January

- 16 – Paedophile Gert van Rooyen shoots his accomplice and lover Joey Haarhoff and then commits suicide soon after a police chase.
- 20 – Thomas Mandlenkosi (Mshengu) Shabalala, an Inkatha Freedom Party National Council member, is shot dead outside his house in Lindelani's C Section, also known as eMadamini, near KwaMashu, Durban.

February

- 2 – State President F.W. de Klerk announces the beginning of the negotiated transition to end apartheid, the unbanning of the African National Congress, Pan Africanist Congress and Communist Party, the release of Nelson Mandela and other political prisoners, and the end of the state of emergency.
- 3 – Rainbow People's March, a small group of demonstrators, express support for the new South Africa by dancing down Adderley Street with a painting by artist Beezy Bailey.
- 11 – Nelson Mandela is released from prison after serving 27 years.

March

- 4 – Brigadier Oupa Gqozo of the Ciskei Defence Force leads a coup in Ciskei.
- 12 – African National Congress president Oliver Tambo and vice-president Nelson Mandela meet for the first time in 28 years in Sweden.
- 21 – Namibia gains independence with the United Nations supervising the withdrawal of South African forces and the first elections.
- 26 – The Minister of Education, Piet Claase, announces that as of January 1991, the segregation of Whites and Blacks in state-run schools will end.
- 26 – Eleven people are killed and more than 300 injured when police open fire on protesters in Sebokeng.

April

- 1 – South African Transport Services become Transnet and the South African Rail Commuter Corporation, with Spoornet and Metrorail as respective railway operators.
- 16 – Nelson Mandela thanks the world in the Wembley Stadium, London, for support during his imprisonment.
- 25 – Dirk Coetzee, former South African Police Commander of the Vlakplaas counter-insurgency unit, testifies at the Harms Commission.
- 28 – Michael Lapsley, an Anglican priest and social activist, loses both his hands and an eye when a letter bomb explodes in his hands.

May

- 1 – Jackie Matjili, Umkhonto we Sizwe member, is shot dead in Thokoza.
- 2–4 – The Groote Schuur Minute is signed after talks between the South African government and the African National Congress in Groote Schuur, Cape Town.
- 6 – P.W. Botha resigns from the National Party in protest against State President F.W de Klerk's reform proposals.

June

- 4 – Nelson Mandela starts a thirteen-nation international tour.
- 5 – Colonel Gabriel Ramushwana, Chairman of the Venda Council for National Unity, announces the lifting of the state of emergency and the unconditional release of all political prisoners in Venda.
- 7 – State President F.W. de Klerk lifts the state of emergency in South Africa that has been in place for ten years.
- 13 – Sipho Phungulwa, one of a group of exiles who were held in African National Congress detention camps in Angola, is shot dead in Umtata while trying to seek an audience with the Transkei ANC leadership to expose the hardships they had endured in Angola. Ndibulele Ndzamela, Mfanelo Matshaya and Pumlani Kubukeli will be granted amnesty on 13 August 1998 in connection with this incident.

July

- 14 – The Inkatha Freedom Party is formed when it is transformed from the Inkatha National Cultural Liberation Movement.

August

- 1 – The African National Congress's armed wing, Umkhonto we Sizwe, suspends its armed actions after 29 years.
- 6 – The Pretoria Minute is signed after talks between the South African government and the African National Congress in Pretoria.
- 12 – Fighting breaks out between the Xhosa people and the Zulu people and more than 500 are killed by the end of August.

September

- 11 – Seven political prisoners are released.
- 13 – Six men boarding train No. 9436 at Johannesburg's Jeppe station, between Johannesburg and Soweto, massacred, hacked and threw passengers in a macabre attack, killing 26 and injuring 100 people. Two armed gangs, in the attack, displayed style of RENAMO, who were suspected to avenge insults to Mangosuthu Buthelezi.
- 23–25 – State President F.W. de Klerk visits Washington on a state visit.
- 27 – Fourteen political prisoners are released

October

- 15 – The Reservation of Separate Amenities Act is repealed, ending racial segregation of public facilities.
- 19 – The National Party opens its membership to all races.

November

- 4 – South Africa announces that Harry Schwarz, a prominent anti-apartheid campaigner in Parliament, will be its next ambassador to the United States, the first serving politician from opposition ranks to be appointed to a senior ambassadorial post in South African history.

December

- 14–16 – The African National Congress holds a national consultative conference in Johannesburg.
- George Bizos becomes a member of the African National Congress's Legal and Constitutional Committee.

== Births ==
- 20 January – Jessica Nkosi, actress
- 22 January – Kelly Smuts, cricketer
- 28 January – Daylon Claasen, footballer
- 1 February – Buhle Mkhwanazi, football player
- 1 February – Ramahlwe Mphahlele, football player
- 5 February
  - Charlbi Dean, actress and model (d. 2022)
  - Toya Delazy, singer, pianist & dancer
- 7 February – Cobus Reinach, rugby player
- 9 February – Nhlanhla Khuzwayo known as Brilliant Khuzwayo, football player
- 18 February – Tabraiz Shamsi, cricketer
- 1 March – Eric Mathoho, football player
- 12 March – Karla Pretorius, netball player
- 13 March – Charlie Purdon, rugby player
- 13 March – Vincent Koch, rugby player
- 16 March – Maps Maponyane, tv presenter, model, fashion designer & entrepreneur
- 10 April – Andile Jali, football player
- 11 April – Anthony Phillips, baseball player
- 11 April – Thulani Serero, football player
- 28 April – Boity Thulo, actress, rapper & tv personality
- 1 May – Sifiso Hlanti, football player
- 3 May – Paula Reto, golfer
- 17 May – Jody Williams, singer
- 18 May – Nadia Nakai, rapper & songwriter
- 18 May – Simoné Nortmann, actress
- 5 June – Dylan Frittelli, golfer
- 18 June – Thando Thabethe, actress, radio DJ, tv host & the first ever African brand ambassador for Nivea
- 28 June – Lance Louw, rugby player
- 7 July – Minnie Dlamini, actress & model
- 13 July – Nomzamo Mbatha, actress, television personality & UNHCR Goodwill Ambassador
- 26 July – Makazole Mapimpi, rugby player
- 1 August – Elton Jantjies, rugby player
- 8 August – Oti Mabuse, dancer
- 19 August - Thandokuhle Xaba, business man, SFM CEO
- 20 August – Culoe De Song, producer, remixer and DJ
- 8 September – Tokelo Rantie, football player
- 10 September – Sebastien Rousseau, swimmer
- 13 September – Lebogang Manyama; football player
- 21 September – Nkosinathi Manganyi; The Journey Walker, Author & Entrepreneur
- 7 October – Bontle Modiselle, actress, tv presenter, dancer & choreographer
- 17 October – Patrick Lambie, rugby player & coach
- 30 October – Sebastian de Chaves, rugby player
- 27 November – Franco Mostert, rugby player
- 4 December – Schalk van der Merwe, rugby player
- 16 December – Cassper Nyovest, rapper and record producer
- 24 December – Liesl Laurie, Miss South Africa 2015

== Deaths ==
- 16 January – Gert van Rooyen, paedophile and serial killer. (b. 1938)
- 17 April – Jafta Masemola, leader of the Pan-Africanist Congress. (b. 1929)
- 23 October – Zephania Mothopeng, leader of the Pan-Africanist Congress. (b. 1913)

== Railways ==
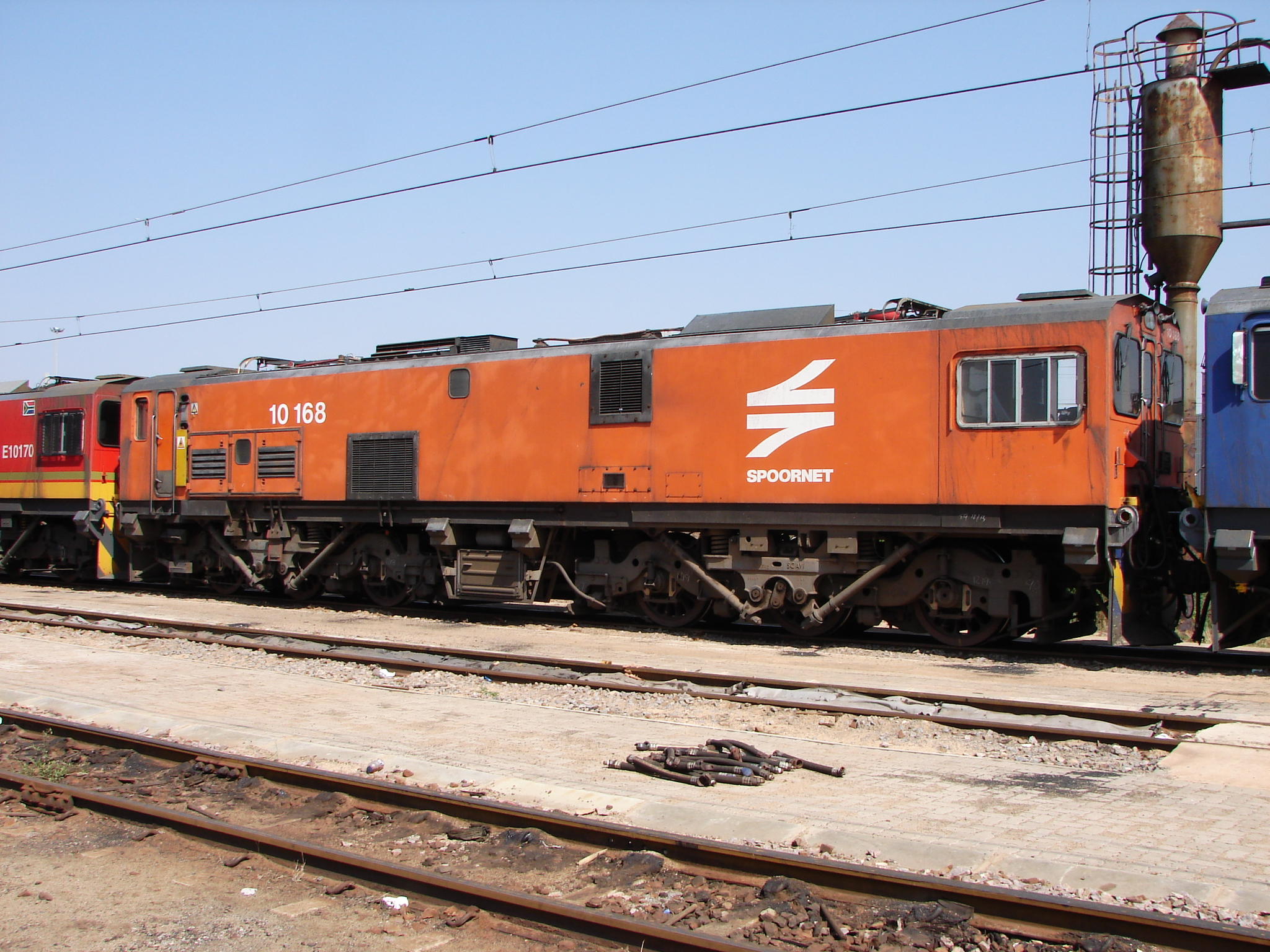
Class 10E1, Series 2

=== Locomotives ===
- Spoornet places the first of fifty Class 10E1, Series 2 electric locomotives in mainline service.
- Spoornet begins to semi-permanently couple pairs of otherwise unmodified Class 6E1 electric locomotives and reclassify them to Class 16E.

== Sports ==
=== Athletics ===
- 24 February – David Tsebe wins his first national title in the men's marathon, clocking 2:09:50 in Port Elizabeth.
