= Minister of Safety & Security v Hamilton =

South African legal case

Minister of Safety and Security v Hamilton is an important case in South African law, in particular the law of delict, but with implications also for criminal law. It was heard before the Supreme Court of Appeal (SCA) on 21 August 2003, with judgment handed down on 26 September.

== Facts ==
In terms of the Arms and Ammunition Act, one Erna Lochiel McArdell in September 1993 applied successfully for a gun licence. Ten months later, during a parking-lot altercation, she shot Hamilton in the back.

Hamilton sustained a serious spinal injury, rendering him unable to walk, and some three years later claimed damages against the Minister of Safety and Security. The police, he argued, had been in negligent breach of their "legal duty to exercise reasonable care in considering, investigating, recommending and ultimately granting McArdell's application for a firearm licence." They had incurred vicarious liability, in that their dereliction of duty, unwittingly but effectively, had enabled McArdell's assault.

The applicable delictual action was the lex Aquilia, and all the essential elements of delict were present:

- Hamilton had suffered physical harm;
- the conduct of the police had constituted an omission, been wrongful and incurred fault in the form of dolus; and
- there was clear factual causation between the negligence of the police and Hamilton's shooting.

== Judgment ==
The SCA dismissed the Minister's appeal and upheld the decision of the High Court, so that the Minister was found to be liable to Hamilton for the harm suffered in McArdell's attack. The police were found to have

a legal duty to take proper measures to screen an application for a firearm licence by making such enquiries as are reasonable in the circumstances to corroborate the veracity of the information furnished to them by the applicant in relation to his or her physical, temperamental and psychological fitness to possess a (potentially lethal) firearm.

The court believed that, had not the police been negligent in this regard—that is, had they taken the "reasonable pre-caution" detailed above—they would have come to the view that McArdell ought not to receive a firearm licence. The dangers were obvious:

A reasonable person in the position of the [police] would have foreseen that, in the absence of any such corroborative enquiries, an applicant for a firearm licence who [...] was clearly unfit to possess a firearm, might have a firearm licence issued to him or her and that this might well result in harm being in-flicted on a member of the general public.

Finally, the court determined, having regard to considerations of "reasonableness, fairness or legal policy," that Hamilton's loss was not too remote to permit a claim for damages.
