= 1991 in South Africa =

- Decades: 1970s; 1980s; 1990s; 2000s; 2010s
- See also: List of years in South Africa

The following lists events that happened during 1991 in South Africa.

== Incumbents ==
- State President: F.W. de Klerk.
- Chief Justice: Michael Corbett.

== Events ==
January

- 9 – Black children are admitted to schools previously reserved for whites only.
- 9 – In Sebokeng gunmen fire on mourners attending the funeral of a leader of the African National Congress, killing 13.
- 12 – 45 mourners are killed during an attack on a funeral vigil for an African National Congress member.
- 13 – 45 football fans die in the Orkney Stadium Disaster in the Oppenheimer Stadium in Orkney.
- 29 – State President F.W. de Klerk, deputy-president of the African National Congress Nelson Mandela and Inkatha Freedom Party leader Mangosuthu Buthelezi meet for peace talks.

February

- 1 – At the signing of a national peace accord State President F.W. de Klerk promises to end all apartheid legislation and to create a new multi-racial constitution.
- 25 – Chief Mhlabunzima Maphumulo is shot dead by an alleged hit-squad outside his home in Pietermaritzburg.

March

- 11 March – A curfew is imposed on black townships after fighting between rival political gangs kills 49.
- 12 – The government tables a white paper to end racial discrimination in land ownership and occupation.
- 24 – Twelve people, including a police officer and two children, are killed when police opens fire on a crowd of African National Congress supporters attacking the police in Daveyton.

April

- 15 – The European Economic Community lifts economic sanctions on South Africa.
- 30 – A coup d'état is executed in Lesotho.

May

- 14 – Winnie Madikizela-Mandela, dubbed the "Mugger of the Nation", is found guilty and sentenced to 6 years imprisonment for her involvement in the death of 14-year-old Stompie Moeketsi. The sentence will never be carried out.

June

- 28 – The Population Registration Act in terms of which South Africans were classified into racial groups is repealed.
- 30 – The laws enforcing geographical segregation, including the Group Areas Act, the Native Land Act, the Native Trust and Land Act and the Asiatic Land Tenure Act, are repealed.

July

- 2–6 – The 48th National Conference of the African National Congress takes place in Durban, the first to be held in South Africa since 1959.
- 9 – The suspension of South Africa from the International Olympic Committee is lifted.
- 10 – President Bush announces the United States is ending its 1986-enacted sanctions on South Africa.

August

- 4 – The Greek-owned cruise ship Oceanos sinks off Coffee Bay and all 571 passengers on board are safely evacuated by SAAF helicopters.
- 9 – Right-wingers of the Afrikaner Weerstandsbeweging clash with the police in the Battle of Ventersdorp.

September

- 4 – State President F.W. de Klerk announces a new constitution that will provide suffrage for black people.
- 7 – Australian children's series Johnson and Friends debuts on SABC 2.

October

- 2 – Minister of Foreign Affairs Pik Botha visits Beijing to strengthen South Africa's relations with China.
- 3 – Nadine Gordimer is awarded the 1991 Nobel Prize in Literature.

November

- 4–5 – The African National Congress leads a general strike to demand a role in governing and an end to value-added tax.

December

- 8 – Chris Hani becomes leader of the South African Communist Party.

Unknown date

- The Phinda Resource Reserve is formed.
- The great white shark is given full protection under South African law.

== Births ==
- 1 January – Jacob Maliekal, badminton player
- 7 January
  - Bongi Mbonambi, rugby player
  - Caster Semenya, middle-distance runner, Olympic champion
- 9 February – Lyle Peters, footballer
- 14 February – Alberto Mazzoncini, cricketer
- 16 February – Marilyn Ramos, Miss South Africa 2012
- 5 March – Kate Christowitz, rower
- 11 March – Kamohelo Mokotjo, football player
- 14 March – Frans Malherbe, rugby player
- 28 April – Liesl Laurie, model
- 14 June – Kyle Jacobs, footballer
- 16 June – Siya Kolisi, South Africa national rugby union team captain
- 30 June – Kevin Paul, Paralympic swimmer
- 3 July – Josiah De Disciple, DJ & record producer
- 8 July – Thuso Mbedu, actress
- 30 July – Heinrich Klaasen, cricketer
- 17 August – Zakir Kathrada, cricketer
- 26 August – Chris Pappas, politician, mayor of uMngeni Local Municipality
- 28 September – Michael van Vuuren, rugby player
- 19 October – Faf de Klerk, rugby player
- 29 October – Eben Etzebeth, rugby player
- 25 November – Thandeka Zulu, actress & singer
- 25 November – Damian de Allende, rugby player
- 7 December – JP Jonck, rugby player
- 10 December – Gugu Gumede, actress

== Deaths ==
- 24 February – John Charles Daly, South African-born journalist and game show host. (b. 1914)
- 11 June – Cromwell Everson, composer. (b. 1925)

== Railways ==
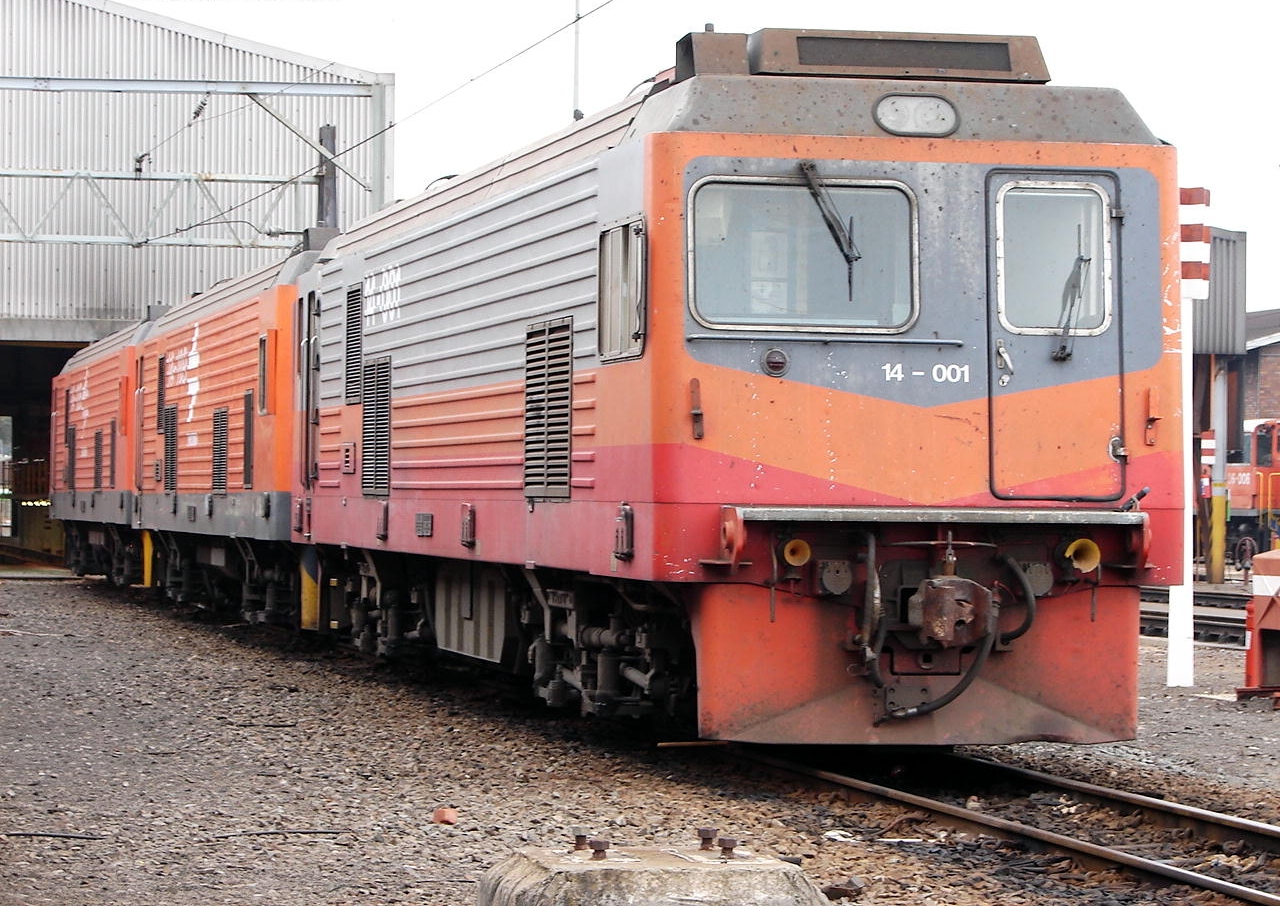
Class 14E

=== Locomotives ===
- Spoornet places three prototype Class 14E dual voltage electric mainline locomotives in stock service, following intensive testing. They are the first dual voltage 3 kV DC and 25 kV AC locomotives to see service in South Africa.

== Sports ==
=== Athletics ===
12 to 17 September - 1991 ATP Tour World Championships
