= 1993 in South Africa =

- Decades: 1970s; 1980s; 1990s; 2000s; 2010s
- See also: 1993 in South African sport; List of years in South Africa

The following lists events that happened during 1993 in South Africa.

== Incumbents ==
- State President: F.W. de Klerk.
- Chief Justice: Michael Corbett.

== Events ==
March

- 24 – State President F.W. de Klerk informs Parliament that South Africa constructed six nuclear fission devices that had been dismantled by the end of 1989.

April

- 8 – South Africa and India sign a memorandum of understanding on bilateral air services.
- 10 – Chris Hani is assassinated by Polish immigrant Janusz Waluś.

May

- 1 – Members of the Azanian People's Liberation Army, armed wing of the Pan Africanist Congress, attack civilians at the Highgate Hotel in East London, killing five.
- 4 – At their annual meeting in Sweden, Nordic development ministers decide to continue support to the African National Congress.
- 5 – Nelson Mandela addresses a joint sitting of two houses of the United Kingdom Parliament.
- 5 – Members of the Azanian People's Liberation Army kill four police officers at Dobsonville, Soweto.
- An Indian diplomatic Cultural Centre is opened in Johannesburg

June

- 4 – Eleven people are killed in clashes between African National Congress and Inkatha Freedom Party members in Estcourt.
- 4 – South Africa signs the Convention on Biological Diversity.

July

- 25 – members of the Azanian People's Liberation Army open fire on a congregation inside St James Church in Kenilworth, Cape Town, killing eleven and injuring fifty.

August

- 19 – An RPG is fired at the East London petrol depot, but does not explode and results in a shootout with the South African Police (SAP).
- 23 – The Motsuenyane Commission finds the African National Congress guilty of abuse in some camps in exile, thereby confirming the findings of the Skweyiya Commission.

September

- 2 – National Peace Day is observed in response to political violence, largely concentrated in black townships, that has claimed thousands of lives.
- 23 – The United States Senate approves legislation lifting economic sanctions against South Africa.

October

- 18 – Five school children are killed in the Mthatha Massacre when the South African Defence Force opens fire on the house of a member of the Pan Africanist Congress.

November

- 18 – Twenty-one political parties approve a new interim constitution of South Africa.
- 22 – India re-establishes full diplomatic relations with South Africa.
- A South African diplomatic mission is opened in New Delhi, India

December

- 7 – The 32-member Transitional Executive Council holds its first meeting in Cape Town, the first meeting of an official government body in South Africa with black members.
- 10 – State President F.W. de Klerk and Nelson Mandela are jointly awarded the Nobel Peace Prize.
- 22 – The interim South African constitution is approved by Parliament.
- 30 – Six members of the Azanian People's Liberation Army (APLA), armed wing of the Pan Africanist Congress, open fire on patrons of the Heidelberg Tavern in Observatory, Cape Town, killing four and injuring several others.
- The Indian Cultural Centre in Johannesburg is upgraded to a Consulate-General.

== Births ==
- 8 January – Anatii, singer, songwriter and record producer
- 17 February – Kai Luke Brümmer, actor
- 18 March – Siyabulela Shai, soccer player
- 16 April – Chad Da Don, hip-hop record producer, songwriter and rapper
- 15 April – Jan Serfontein, rugby player
- 20 April – Brandon Stone, golfer
- 28 May - Ami Faku, singer, songwriter
- 30 May - DBN Gogo, DJ & music producer
- 5 June – Brandon Theron, soccer player
- 11 June – Kwagga Smith, rugby player
- 5 July – Sandra le Grange, badminton player
- 22 July – Thembinkosi Lorch, soccer player
- 30 July – Robert du Preez, rugby player
- 8 August - Zanda Zakuza, singer
- 23 August - Matthew Fish, citizen
- 1 September – Thebe Magugu, fashion designer
- 18 September – Zozibini Tunzi, Miss Universe 2019, the first black South African to be crowned Miss Universe
- 28 October – Cheslin Kolbe, rugby player
- 16 November – Anrich Nortje, cricketer
- 28 November – Lukhanyo Am, rugby player

== Deaths ==
- 20 March – Gerard Sekoto, artist. (b. 1913)
- 23 March – Edison Ntsanwisi, Chief Minister of Gazankulu. (b. 1920)
- 10 April – Chris Hani, activist. (b. 1942)
- 22 April – Andries Treurnicht, politician. (b. 1921)
- 24 April – Oliver Tambo, ANC President. (b. 1917)
- 14 July – Harold Willmott, military commander. (b. 1899)
- 7 August – A. P. Mda, politician. (b. 1916)
- 10 November – Wensley Pithey, South African-born English actor. (b. 1914)

== Railways ==
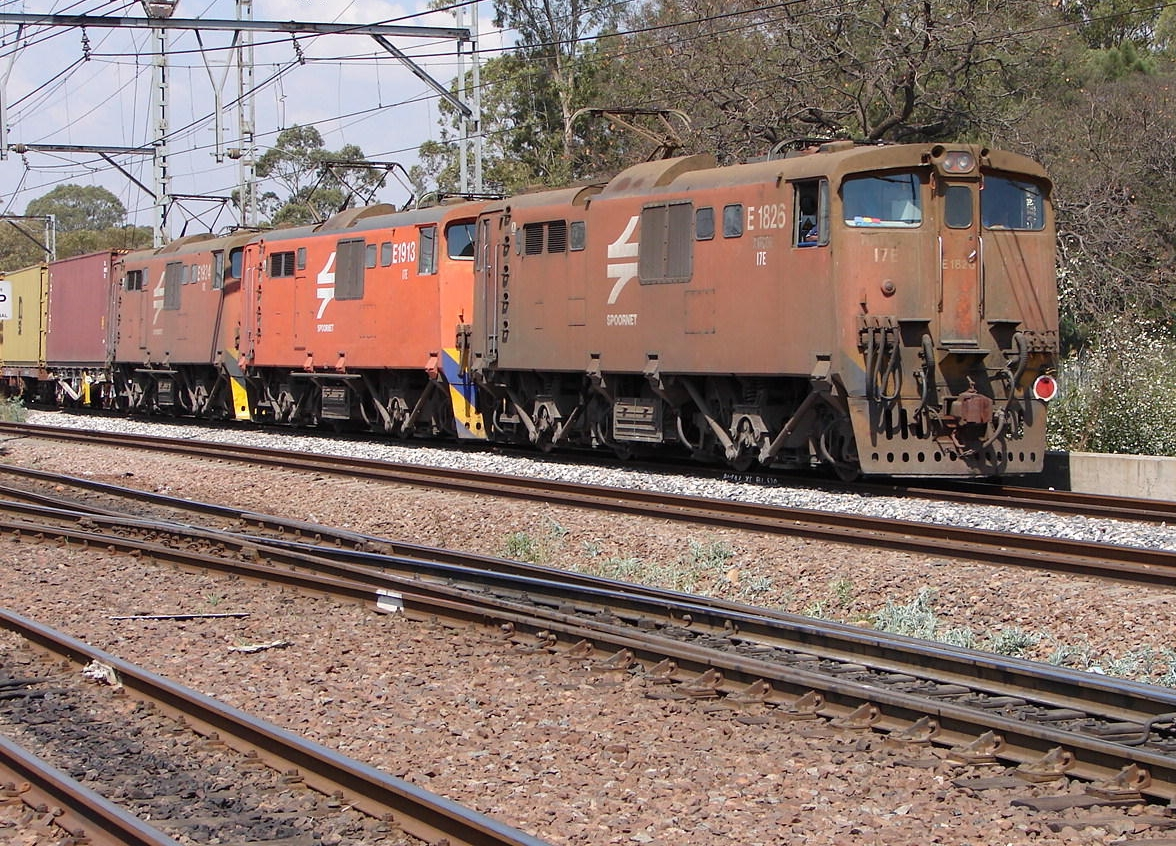
Class 17E

=== Locomotives ===
- Spoornet begins to modify Class 6E1, Series 7, Series 8 and Series 9 locomotives to improve their braking and traction reliability on the Natal mainline and reclassify them to Class 17E.
- Amcoal, a subsidiary of Anglo American, places three Class E38 electric locomotives in service at its Kromdraai Colliery near Witbank.

== Sports ==
=== Athletics ===
- 20 March – Josia Thugwane wins his first national title in the men's marathon, clocking 2:14:25 in Cape Town.

== See also ==
- List of terrorist incidents, 1993
