= 1995 in South African sport =

This is a list of events in South African sport in 1995.

== Football (Rugby Union) ==
- 25 May – 24 June – South Africa hosts and wins the Third Rugby World Cup

== Football (Soccer) ==
=== April ===
- 26 April – South Africa (Bafana Bafana) beats Lesotho 3–1 at the Setsoto Stadium, Maseru, Lesotho in a friendly match

=== May ===
- 13 May – Bafana Bafana draws with Argentina 1–1 at the Ellis Park Stadium, Johannesburg in the Nelson Mandela Challenge

=== September ===
- 30 September – Bafana Bafana beats Mozambique 3–2 at Soccer City, Johannesburg, in a friendly match

=== November ===
- 22 November – Bafana Bafana draws with Zambia 2–2 at Loftus Versfeld Stadium, Pretoria, in the Simba Cup
- 24 November – Bafana Bafana beats Egypt 2–0 at Independence Stadium, Mmabatho, in the Simba Cup
- 26 November – Bafana Bafana beats Zimbabwe 2–0 at Soccer City, Johannesburg, in the Simba Cup

=== December ===
- 15 December – Bafana Bafana draws with the Germany 0–0 at Athletics Stadium, Johannesburg, in a friendly match

== See also ==
- 1994 in South African sport
- 1995 in South Africa
- 1996 in South African sport
- List of years in South African sport
