= 1992 in South Africa =

- Decades: 1970s; 1980s; 1990s; 2000s; 2010s
- See also: 1992 in South African sport; List of years in South Africa

The following lists events that happened during 1992 in South Africa.

== Incumbents ==
- State President: F.W. de Klerk.
- Chief Justice: Michael Corbett.

== Events ==
January

- 11 – Singer Paul Simon is the first major artist to tour South Africa after the end of the cultural boycott.

February

- 3 – State President F.W. de Klerk and Nelson Mandela, the African National Congress leader, are jointly awarded the Felix Houphouet-Boigny Peace Prize at the Unesco headquarters in Paris.
- 25 (about) – South Africa and Bulgaria sign a diplomatic agreement.
- 28 – Ownership of the port town of Walvis Bay is transferred from South Africa to Namibia.
- 28 – South Africa and Russia establish full diplomatic ties.

March

- 12 – Citrusdal in the Cape Province becomes South Africa's first officially recognised non-racial local authority.
- 18 – White South Africans vote in favour of political reforms which will end the apartheid policy and create a power-sharing multi-racial government.
- The Skweyiya Commission finds the African National Congress guilty of having a systematic policy of abuse and violation of human rights in some camps of exile.

April

- 13 – Nelson Mandela announces his separation from his wife Winnie Madikizela-Mandela at a press conference in Johannesburg.

June

- 4 – The co.za internet domain is created.
- 17 – Violence breaks out between the African National Congress and the Inkatha Freedom Party in Boipatong, leaving 46 dead.
- 21 – Nelson Mandela announces that the African National Congress will halt negotiations with the government of South Africa following the Boipatong massacre of 17 June.

July

- 9 – Chief Julius Matatu, former Transkei minister and prominent traditional leader, is shot dead at his home in Mqanduli, Transkei.

August

- 3–4 – Black South Africans participate in a general strike called by the African National Congress to protest the lack of progress in negotiations with the government of State President F.W. de Klerk.
- 15 – South Africa plays its first rugby test since the abolishment of apartheid.

September

- 7 – 29 people are killed in the Bisho massacre when the Ciskei Defence Force opens fire on about 100,000 protesters in Bisho, Ciskei.

November

- 28 – The Azanian People's Liberation Army, the military wing of the Pan Africanist Congress, massacres civilians at the King William's Town Golf Club, killing four people.

December

- 1 – South Korea re-establishes diplomatic relations with South Africa. South Korea first established diplomatic relations with South Africa in 1961, but withdrew its recognition in 1978 in protest of apartheid.
- 19 – State President F.W. de Klerk dismisses 23 senior military officers, including 6 generals, on unfounded suspicion of unauthorized activities designed to disrupt negotiations with the African National Congress.

Unknown date

- Trevor Manuel becomes head of the African National Congress Department of Economic Planning.

== Births ==
- 21 January – Ronwen Williams, football player
- 29 January – Eben Barnard, rugby player
- 2 February – Nelisa Mchunu, actress
- 10 February – Steven Kitshoff, rugby player
- 3 March – Gideon Trotter, sprinter
- 10 March – Zola Nombona, actress
- 23 March – Rynardt van Rensburg, middle-distance runner
- 8 April – James Hilton McManus, badminton player
- 12 April – Chad le Clos, swimmer
- 22 April – Rolene Strauss, Miss World 2014, model
- 2 May – Grace Legote, rhythmic gymnast
- 3 May – Daniel Sincuba, cricketer
- 9 May – Sho Madjozi, rapper, poet, writer, and actress
- 21 June – Taariq Fielies, footballer
- 24 June – Dominique Scott-Efurd, long-distance runner
- 26 June – Allisen Camille, badminton player
- 13 July – Mogau Motlhatswi, actress
- 10 August – Chanel Simmonds, tennis player
- 13 August – Jenny-Lyn Anderson, South African-born Australian swimmer
- 14 August – Innocent Maela, football player
- 20 August – Pieter-Steph du Toit, rugby player, 2019 World Rugby Player of the Year
- 22 August – Pallance Dladla, actor
- 13 September – Rouge (rapper), rapper
- 13 September – Nelisiwe Sibiya, actress
- 15 September – Emtee, rapper
- 9 October – Bongani Zungu, football player
- 26 October – Connie Chen, golfer
- 27 November – Kabza De Small, DJ & record producer
- 30 November – Ryan de Villiers, actor
- 17 December – Lood de Jager, rugby player
- 17 December – Quinton de Kock, cricketer

== Deaths ==
- 20 January – Geoffrey Cronjé founder of Apartheid
- 27 August – Alina Lekgetha, nurse, chairman of South African Nursing Association and politician. (b. 1918)
- 18 October – Abraham Manie Adelstein, South African-born United Kingdom's Chief Medical Statistician. (b. 1916)
- 25 December – Helen Joseph, activist. (b. 1905)

== Railways ==
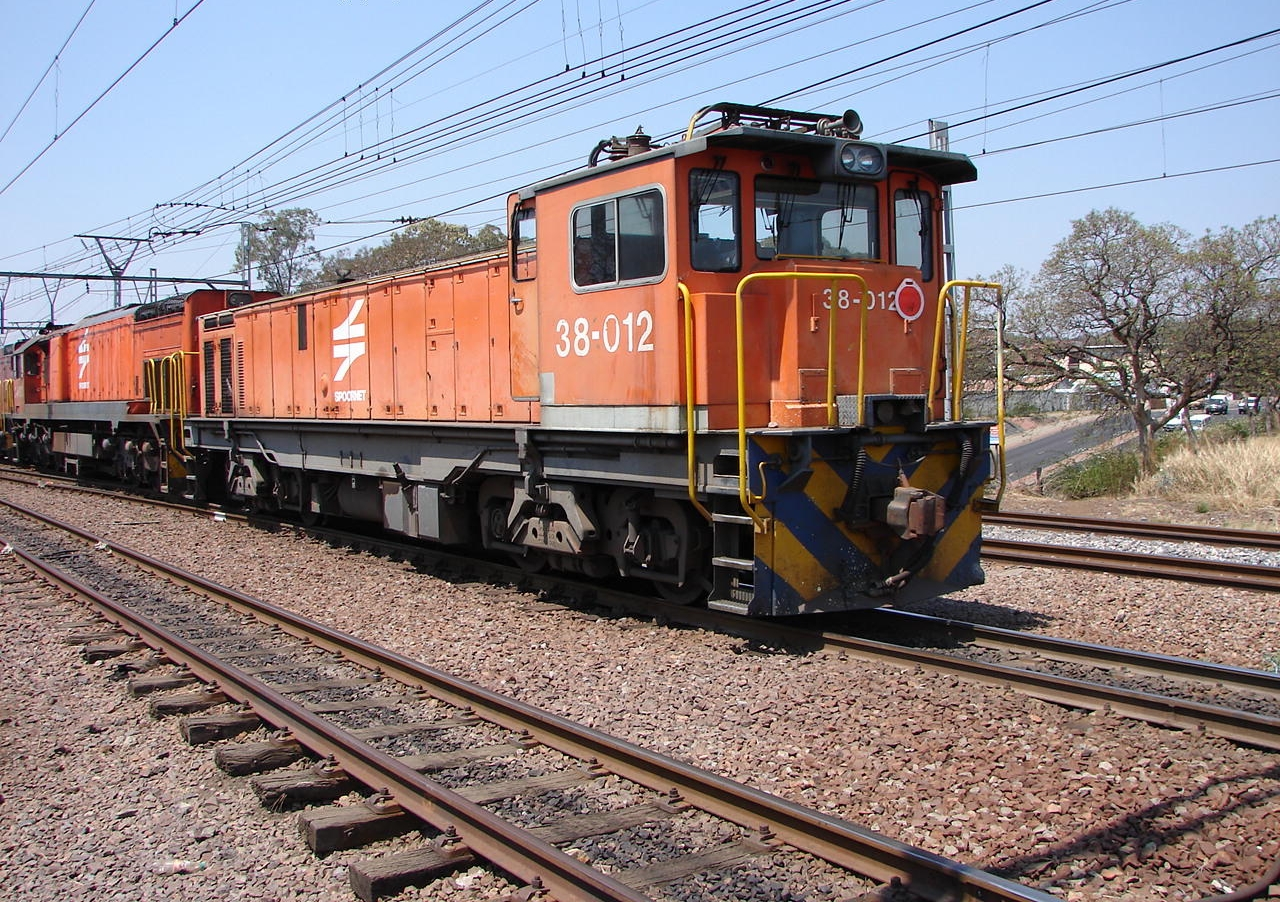
Class 38-000

=== Locomotives ===
- 10 September – Spoornet places the first of fifty Class 38-000 dual mode locomotives in service, the first locomotives in South Africa capable of running either on 3 kV DC electricity off the catenary or on diesel fuel alone.

== Sports ==
=== Athletics ===
- 28 March – Abel Mokibe wins his first national title in the men's marathon, clocking 2:11:07 in Cape Town.
