= 1988 in South Africa =

- Decades: 1960s; 1970s; 1980s; 1990s; 2000s
- See also: List of years in South Africa

The following lists events that happened during 1988 in South Africa.

== Incumbents ==
- State President: P.W. Botha.
- Chief Justice: Pieter Jacobus Rabie.

== Events ==
January

- 1 – Nordic countries implement comprehensive sanctions against South Africa and South West Africa which are intended to counteract apartheid.
- 8 – Jacob Molokwane, activist, is shot dead in his car in Francistown, Botswana.
- 10 – Six African National Congress cadres are injured in a car bomb explosion in Bulawayo, Zimbabwe.
- 25 – Cadres wound a policeman when they open fire at a police roadblock set up at Ugie.
- 25 – A Limpet mine explodes at the Kokstad Men's Club opposite the police station.
- 27 – Cadres open fire on a police vehicle in Soweto and injure three policemen and a civilian.
- 29 – Linda Brakvis, a United Democratic Front member, is found stabbed three days after her release from detention.

February

- 1 – Three cadres are killed and one injured at a police roadblock in Transkei.
- 2 – A cadre is killed in a skirmish with police near Mount Fletcher.
- 3 – The Congress of South African Trade Unions offices in Pietermaritzburg come unter attack by a mob armed with pangas and Assegais.
- 6 – A policeman is killed in an attack at East London.
- 10 – Rocky Malebane-Metsing leads a group of dissatisfied members of the Bophuthatswana Defence Force and the National Executive Committee of the People's Progressive Party to stage a coup d'état in Bophuthatswana.
- 12 – Two municipal policemen guarding an installation are injured when they are attacked by cadres.
- 12 – A cadre opens fire on a car driven by an ex-Rhodesian soldier, now a private security firm official, in Johannesburg.
- 14 – The South African Defence Force launches Operation Hooper.
- Twelve people are injured in a bomb blast at Wits Medical Command administration building in Braamfontein, Johannesburg.

March

- 1 – An explosion in Benoni causes extensive damage to a bus transporting South African Air Force personnel.
- 7 – A cadre and a civilian are killed by police during a raid in Queenstown, and six policemen are wounded in the raid.
- 8 – An attack by cadres on the Phiri Hall police mess kills one policeman and wounds 10 others.
- 12 – A church-led opposition group headed by Desmond Tutu is banned.
- 14 – A bomb explodes at Johannesburg City Hall, with no injuries.
- 17 – Mohammed Ichbahl and Aboobaker Ismail set up two bombs at the Krugersdorp magistrate's court adjacent to the local police station. One explodes and kills two South African Defence Force personnel and a civilian while twenty other people are injured.
- 18 – Insurgents attack a tavern in Atteridgeville frequented by policemen. Three policemen are killed in the attack.
- 25 – Three cadres are killed by the South African Army at Batavia in the far northern Transvaal.
- 27 – The Antheas Club in Pietersburg is slightly damaged by a limpet mine which explodes in the back garden.
- 28 – Four cadres are killed and one injured by the South African Army on an island on the Mutale river.
- An electrical sub-station in Fort Jackson is damaged when three limpet mines explode.

April

- 4 – The South African Special Forces Brigade raids an African National Congress insurgent hideout in Gaborone, Botswana, killing four ANC cadres.
- 7 – A car bomb explodes in Maputo, Mozambique, injuring Albie Sachs, an anti-apartheid lawyer.
- 9 – A limpet mine explodes near the Atteridgeville Development Board's canteen.
- 12 – In a Mpumalanga township, police corner a cadre who then kills himself and two policemen with a grenade. Police later kill a second cadre and a policeman is killed and three civilians wounded in the crossfire.
- 15 – A limpet mine explodes at the Atteridgeville Municipal offices.
- 15 – A bomb explodes prematurely outside Pretoria's Sterland cinema, killing the terrorist and injuring a bystander. According to the African National Congress the intended target was a nearby government building. There are no government buildings nearby.
- 19 – An explosion at a private office block less than 100 m from Parliament damages a branch of Santam bank.
- 22 – A cadre ambushes a municipal police vehicle in Soweto and wounds four policemen and one civilian.
- 25 – Police Sergeant J.M. Mazibuku is killed by cadres at a bus stop in Newcastle.
- A bomb explodes at the Johannesburg City Hall, with no injuries.

May

- 1 – A special guard unit vehicle is attacked in Cape Town, with no injuries.
- 3–6 – An ILO Tripartite Conference on Action Against Apartheid is held in Harare, Zimbabwe.
- 4 – A limpet mine explodes against a wall of the Kagiso Police single quarters.
- 4 – Representatives of South Africa, United States of America, Angola and Cuba meet in London to search for a solution to the Angolan war and independence for Namibia.
- 10 – A child is killed when insurgents throw a grenade at a policeman's home in Mamelodi.
- 14 – A cadre is killed when police raids his home in Newcastle.
- 24 – At the Germiston railway station, an insurgent opens fire on policemen and is killed when the police returns fire. Three civilians are injured in the crossfire.
- 25 – Two people are killed and 38 injured when a Sofasonke Party rally in Soweto comes under a grenade attack. The African National Congress denies knowledge and blames "armed political renegades".
- 26 – A limpet mine detonates outside African Eagle Building in Pretoria during lunch hour, injuring four people from the Ruth Arndt Early Learning Centre.
- 28 – A device explodes at the bottom of a platform staircase at the Johannesburg railway station and injures one person.

June

- 3 – An explosion occurs at the South African Irish Regiment HQ in Anderson Street, Johannesburg.
- 3 – A bomb explodes during lunch hour outside Standard Bank in Roodepoort, killing four and injuring eighteen civilians.
- 5 – A bomb is detonated while a train is standing at Saulsville railway station.
- 20 – A Ciskei policeman, Warrant Officer Swelindawo, is injured in an explosion at his home in Mdantsane.
- 22 – Ten civilians are killed when a limpet mine explodes at an amusement arcade in Winning Side Arcade in Johannesburg.
- 26 – A limpet mine is discovered and defused at Papagallo Restaurant in East London.
- 27 – Cuban MiG-23 Flogger jet fighters attack the Calueque Water Scheme and twelve South African soldiers are killed by a direct hit by a bomb. During the raid, a SADF 20mm Ystervark AAA system shoots down one MiG-23 Flogger and the Cuban/FAPLA pilot is killed.
- 29 – A bomb kills two South African Defence Force members, two Prisons personnel and 13 civilians when it explodes at a cafe in Poynton building.
- A bomb explodes near Soweto's Inhlanzani station, with no injuries.
- A mini-limpet mine explodes at a Pretoria snack bar, injuring 18 civilians.

July

- 2 – A car bomb, set by Harold Matshididi and Billy Agie Shoke, explodes near the gate of Ellis Park stadium in Johannesburg, killing two civilians and injuring thirty-seven.
- 5 – A cadre is killed by police in a raid in Gugulethu.
- 7 – Trevor Manuel, Ebrahim Rasool, Mountrain Qumbela, Hilda Ndude and Mzonke Jacobsis are released from detention.
- 12 – A Land mine incident occurs – no details available.
- 14 – The South African Army tracks and kills four insurgents in the Kruger National Park following the 12 July landmine incident.
- 14 – Violence erupts between the Inkatha Freedom Party and the African National Congress in Richmond.
- 16 – A cadre opens fire at a police vehicle in Nyanga, killing an innocent bystander. Police return fire and the cadre is wounded.
- 17 – An insurgent opens fire on a police vehicle from the back of a pickup while travelling on the highway near Soweto. Two policemen are injured.
- 20 – A major battle between the South African Defence Force and Cuban forces begins near Calueque in Angola.
- 22 – A grenade is thrown at the home of B.E. Qakisa, the Soweto Council personnel manager.
- 23 – A cadre is wounded by police in Pinetown, KwaZulu-Natal.
- 26 – Three grenade attacks are carried out on the homes of Administration Board employees P. Legare, Naledi and Gumede in Soweto.
- 29 – One person is injured when a limpet mine explodes at a Bus stop on the corner of Victoria and Odendaal Streets in Germiston.
- 30 – One person is killed and 57 injured when a limpet mine, planted by ANC terrorists, explodes at lunch time at a Wimpy restaurant in Benoni.
- Bulelani Ngcuka is detained for organising a Nelson Mandela birthday celebration.
- An explosion outside the home of a member of the Presidents Council, Dr Ismail Jajbhay, in Lenasia results in no injuries.

August

- 3 – A car bomb explodes outside Witwatersrand Command, Johannesburg, with no injuries.
- 3 – Five cadres are killed in two incidents in the Bridgewater area.
- 4 – A cadre is killed and one escapes in a police raid near the Wild Coast Sun hotel in Transkei.
- 5 – A limpet mine is discovered and safely detonated at the Morula Sun Casino.
- 13 – An explosion at the Hyde Park Shopping Centre, Johannesburg, injures three people.
- 19 – A mini-limpet mine explodes within the Castle grounds in Cape Town.
- 20 – A grenade is thrown at the home of mayor Eddie Makeba in Duncan Village.
- 23 – An explosion at lunch hour injures 23 people at the Wimpy restaurant on Oxford Street, East London.
- 24 – A limpet mine is discovered outside the Wimpy in Standerton and safely detonated.
- A mini-limpet mine explodes at the Westville Post Office near Durban.

September

- 2 – Limpet mines are discovered and defused at the Standerton post office.
- 2 – Two people are injured when a limpet mine explodes at 17h30 outside a shop on the corner of Smith and Fenton Streets in Durban.
- 3 – A cadre is killed and four policemen are injured in Molweni, Durban.
- 7 – An explosion in the basement of North Park Plaza Shopping Centre kills one person.
- 8 – A grenade is thrown into the home of a couple who did not join a strike, Mr and Mrs Modiko, and injures a child.
- 10 – An explosion occurs at the Moroka Police Station barracks.
- 10 – A mini-limpet explodes under a basin next to a back door of a Lenasia HOD candidate, Mrs Ebrahim.
- 19 – A car bomb explodes outside flats in Benoni, 100 m from the Police station, and two civilians are injured.
- 21 – An explosion after 17h00 injures 14 people at the Vanderbijlpark bus terminal.
- 22 – An explosion at the home of municipal election candidate S.D. Goolam injures four policemen, two guards and a civilian.
- Trevor Manuel is detained for the third time, only to be released in 1989.
- A bomb explodes at the Laudium home of a Pretoria municipal election candidate.
- Three limpet mines explode in Lenasia at the offices of the Lenasia bus service, at the home of the Lenasia Management Committee and the offices of the House of Delegates.
- A bomb explodes at the King Williams Town Magistrates Court.
- A mini-limpet mine explodes at the Woodstock Police Station.
- A child is injured when the home of a municipal policeman is attacked in Soweto.
- A bomb explodes at a discotheque in Hillbrow, injuring 19 civilians.
- A limpet mine explosion at Vinderbijl Square bus terminus in Johannesburg injures 19 civilians.
- A hand grenade is thrown from a moving car at the home of Allan Hendrickse, leader of the Labour Party.
- A bomb under a car in a parking lot of an East London hotel explodes after the area is cleared.

October

- A bomb explodes at the Redhill Post Office in Durban, with no injuries.
- A bomb damages the campaign HQ of a Wentworth municipal candidate in Durban.
- A municipal councillor and assistant escape injury when hand grenades are thrown at them in Thokoza.
- An explosion at KwaThema civic centre, which is used as polling station in municipal elections, kills a baby and injures four people.
- Explosions occur at three magistrates courts, Wynberg (Johannesburg), Bishop Lavis, and Stellenbosch, with no injuries reported at all three.
- A bomb causes damage to Woodstock Police Station.
- Four policemen are injured when a limpet mine explodes at Tembisa police barracks.
- A limpet mine which explodes near the Alexandra Municipal Police offices in Johannesburg causes extensive damage.
- The homes of municipal candidates in Wattville and Thokoza are attacked with hand grenades.
- A mini-limpet mine explodes at the Katlehong Municipal Police barracks.
- A bomb explodes in a building housing the Police Security Branch in Potchefstroom.
- A limpet mine explodes at a Sandton sub-station belonging to Eskom.
- A mini-limpet mine damages offices in Deepmeadow.
- A limpet mine explodes at a central Johannesburg bus terminus, injuring four people.
- A car bomb explosion outside a Witbank shopping centre kills two civilians and injures 42.

November

- 15 – "Wit Wolf" Barend Strydom kills eight black passers-by around Strijdom Square in Pretoria.
- A limpet mine explodes at the Port Elizabeth Post Office.
- An explosion at Lenasia civic centre causes no injuries.
- An explosion damages a section of railway line on the outskirts of Durban.
- The Blanke Bevrydingsbeweging (White Liberation Movement) was banned, the first right-wing organisation to be banned.

December

- 7 – Nelson Mandela is moved to Victor Verster Prison.
- 13 – Pik Botha, Foreign Minister, and Magnus Malan, Defence Minister, sign a peace protocol with Denis Sassou-Nguesso, President of the Republic of the Congo, and with Angolan and Cuban signatories in Brazzaville. The protocol ends South Africa's 73-year-old administration of South West Africa.
- 22 – South Africa, Angola and Cuba sign a tripartite agreement at UN headquarters in New York requiring the withdrawal of Cuban forces from Angola and the granting of independence to Namibia by South Africa.
- A limpet mine explodes at the Receiver of Revenue offices in Boksburg.
- A limpet mine explodes at the Department of Home Affairs offices in Brakpan.
- Bombs explode at the magistrates court in Paarl.
- Two explosions in Bisho result in damage to a garage and shop.

Unknown date

- The Progressive Federal Party merges with the newly founded National Democratic Movement and the Independent Party into the Democratic Party.
- Bulelani Ngcuka is elected onto the panel of the Independent Mediation Service of South Africa.
- PJ Powers is banned from radio and TV for a year.
- Rhodes University in Grahamstown establishes South Africa's first e-mail link to the Internet.

== Births ==
- 19 January – Jackson Mabokgwane, football player
- 21 January – Samthing Soweto, singer and songwriter
- 28 January – AKA, rapper
- 10 February – Lalla Hirayama, TV presenter, actress, model
- 3 March – Cecil Afrika, olympics bronze medallist & South Africa Sevens rugby team player
- 3 March – Enhle Mbali Mlotshwa, actress
- 8 March – Zakwe, rapper
- 20 March – Nandi Madida, actress
- 31 March – Louis van der Westhuizen, Namibian cricketer
- 6 April – Francois Hougaard, rugby union player
- 15 April – Juan de Jongh, rugby union player
- 9 May – Clement Maosa, actor
- 15 May – Nicole Flint, Miss South Africa 2009
- 13 May – Pearl Thusi, actress
- 25 May – Cameron van der Burgh, Olympic swimmer
- 2 June – Jo-anne Reyneke, actress
- 22 June – Dean Furman, South Africa national football team captain
- 18 July – Odette Richard, rhythmic gymnast
- 26 July – Pogo, electronic musician
- 30 July – Oupa Manyisa, football player
- 11 August – Kwesta, rapper
- 18 August – Thamsanqa Mkhize, football player
- 6 October – Daniel Cardoso, football player
- 19 October – Mikateko E. Mbambo, activist poet
- 20 October – Candice Swanepoel, supermodel
- 8 November – Busiswa, recording artist, songwriter
- 9 November – Zahara, musician
- 10 November – Denise Zimba, actress
- 23 December – Siyabonga Nhlapo, football player

== Deaths ==
- 17 January – Percy Qoboza, journalist and author. (b. 1938)
- 29 March – Dulcie September, political activist. (b. 1935)
- 12 April – Alan Paton, author and anti-apartheid activist. (b. 1903)
- 22 November – Raymond Dart, anatomist and anthropologist. (b. 1893)

== Sports ==
=== Athletics ===
- 30 April – Willie Mtolo wins his first national title in the men's marathon, clocking 2:10:18 in Cape Town.
