= 1996 in South African sport =

This is a list of events in South African sport in 1996.

== Football (Rugby Union) ==
- 2 July - The South Africa (Springboks) beats Fiji in Pretoria 43-18

== Football (Soccer) ==
=== January ===
- 13 January - South Africa (Bafana Bafana) beats Cameroon 3-0 at Soccer City, Johannesburg, in the African Nations Cup
- 20 January - Bafana Bafana beats Angola 1-0 at Soccer City, Johannesburg, in the African Nations Cup
- 24 January - Bafana Bafana loses to Egypt 0-1 at Soccer City, Johannesburg, in the African Nations Cup
- 27 January - Bafana Bafana beats Algeria 2-1 at Soccer City, Johannesburg, in the African Nations Cup
- 31 January - Bafana Bafana beats Ghana 3-0 at Soccer City, Johannesburg, in the African Nations Cup

=== February ===
- 3 February - Bafana Bafana beats Tunisia 2-0 and wins the 1996 African Nations Cup at Soccer City, Johannesburg

=== April ===
- 24 April - Bafana Bafana loses to Brazil 2-3 in the Nelson Mandela Challenge held at the FNB Stadium, Johannesburg

=== June ===
- 1 June - Bafana Bafana beats Malawi 1-0 at Chicheri Stadium, Blantyre, Malawi in the World Cup qualifiers
- 15 June - Bafana Bafana beats Malawi 3-0 at Soccer City, Johannesburg, in the World Cup qualifiers

=== September ===
- 14 September - Bafana Bafana beats Kenya 1-0 at King's Park Rugby Stadium, Durban in the Simba Cup
- 18 September - Bafana Bafana beats Australia 2-0 at Johannesburg Stadium in the Simba Cup
- 21 September - Bafana Bafana draws with Ghana 0-0 at Loftus Versfeld Rugby Stadium, Pretoria in the Simba Cup

=== November ===
- 9 November - Bafana Bafana beats Zaire 1-0 at Soccer City, Johannesburg, in the World Cup qualifiers

== See also ==
- 1995 in South African sport
- 1996 in South Africa
- 1997 in South African sport
- List of years in South African sport
