= 1989 in South Africa =

- Decades: 1960s; 1970s; 1980s; 1990s; 2000s
- See also: List of years in South Africa

The following lists events that happened during 1989 in South Africa.

== Incumbents ==
- State President:
  - P.W. Botha (until 15 August).
  - F.W. de Klerk (acting from 15 August, incumbent from 20 September).
- Chief Justice: Pieter Jacobus Rabie.

== Events ==
January

- 8 – The African National Congress announces that it will start dismantling its guerrilla camps in Angola in support of the peace process.
- 18 – State President P.W. Botha has a mild stroke.
- 19 – Chris Heunis, Minister of Constitutional Development and Planning, is appointed Acting State President.
- An Eskom sub-station in Glenwood, Durban is damaged by an explosion and police later defuses a second bomb found nearby.
- An explosion occurs at the home in Benoni of the chair of the Ministers Council in the House of Delegates.
- An explosion occurs at an aircraft factory in Ciskei.
- Two municipal police members are killed in a grenade attack on Katlehong's Municipal Police Station.

February

- 2 – An ailing State President Pieter Willem Botha steps down from the leadership of the National Party, but remains state president.
- Trevor Manuel is released from detention under stringent restriction orders.
- An explosion at a municipal police barracks in Soweto injures four policemen.
- An explosion next to a police parade in Katlehong kills a municipal constable and injures nine others.
- A limpet mine explodes at the home of the commander of the Katlehong Police Station, Col. D. Dlamini.

March

- 15–21 – A conference of African National Congress chief representatives and regional treasurers takes place in Gran Municipality, Norway.
- An explosion occurs outside the Natal Command HQ on Durban's beachfront.

April

- 2 – SWAPO violates the border war cease-fire by invading South West Africa from Angola and nearly 300 are killed.

May

- 5 – Three South African Embassy staff are ordered to leave Britain within 7 days because of the attempted smuggling of a Blowpipe missile.
- The South African Air Force's Klippan Radar Station in the Western Transvaal comes under mortar attack.

June

- Four bystanders are injured when a limpet mine explodes under a police vehicle in Duduza.
- A limpet mine explodes under a vehicle parked outside a policeman's home in Tsakane.
- A grenade is thrown at a police patrol in Tsakane.
- A limpet mine explodes in a rubbish bin outside the home of a policeman in Soweto.
- A bomb shatters the windows of KwaThema Police station's dining hall.
- A limpet mine explodes at the Police single quarters in Ratanda.
- A limpet mine explodes at the home of Boetie Abramjee, a National Party MP.

July

- 5 – State President P.W. Botha and Nelson Mandela, in prison at the time, meet for the first time.
- 23 – An explosive device planted at Athlone Magistrate's Court and police complex detonates prematurely, killing two African National Congress members.

August

- 15 – P.W. Botha resigns and F.W. de Klerk succeeds him as acting State President.
- A grenade is thrown into a Labour Party polling station in Bishop Lavis.
- The Brixton Flying Squad HQ is attacked with hand grenades and AK-47s.
- Lt-Col. Frank Zwane, a former liaison officer for the police, and his two sons are injured in a grenade attack in Soweto.
- An explosion occurs at the Athlone Police Station.

September

- 2 – "Purple Rain Protest" rioters in Greenmarket Square, Cape Town are sprayed with a purple dye. The resulting graffiti, "The purple shall govern" graces the pages of newspapers worldwide.
- 20 – F.W. de Klerk becomes the 9th State President of South Africa.
- A police patrol is ambushed by cadres (terrorists) in Katlehong.
- A mini-limpet mine explodes outside the Mamelodi Police station.
- Parliamentary elections are held and the National Party wins again.
- 100,000 people attend a peace march called by Cape Town city mayor Gordon Oliver in conjunction with religious leaders.

October

- 15 – Ahmed Kathrada, Jafta Masemola, Raymond Mhlaba, Wilton Mkwayi, Andrew Mlangeni, Elias Motsoaledi, Oscar Mpetha and Walter Sisulu were released from custody of Apartheid government after some spending more than two decades in prison of Robben Island and other prisons.
- A bomb explodes outside the BP centre in Cape Town and another at Woodstock minutes later.

November

- 27 – The Hex River Tunnels system is officially opened. The system's longest tunnel at 13.5 kilometres (8.4 miles) long is the longest railway tunnel in Africa.
- 30 – Judgement was handed down by the Appellate Division under Chief Judge Michael Corbett in the Administrator, Cape, v Ntshwaqela case.

Unknown date

- The Hluhluwe and Umfolozi Game Reserves are joined through the Corridor Reserve as the Hluhluwe-Umfolozi Game Reserve.
- The government starts dismantling its six nuclear fission devices.

== Births ==
- 15 January – Akhumzi Jezile, actor, television presenter and producer (d. 2018)
- 15 January – Kylie Louw, footballer
- 21 January – Brady Barends, cricketer
- 4 February – Nkosi Johnson, HIV/AIDS (d. 2001)
- 10 February – Simon Harmer, cricketer
- 22 February – JJ Engelbrecht, rugby player
- 24 February – Lauren Brant; Australian entertainer
- 9 March – Carina Horn, sprinter
- 9 March – Luthando Shosha, tv presenter & radio personality
- 22 March – Coenie Oosthuizen, rugby player
- 24 March – Jennifer Fry, badminton player
- 4 April – Dane Paterson, cricketer
- 13 April – Gerhard van den Heever, rugby union player
- 28 April – Alistair Vermaak, rugby union player
- 4 May – Trevor Nyakane, rugby player
- 11 May – Ashleigh Buhai, golfer
- 14 May – Melinda Bam, beauty pageant contestant and model
- 2 June – Dean Burmester, golfer
- 10 June – David Miller, cricketer
- 18 July – Mandla Masango, football player
- 25 July – Victor Hogan, discus thrower
- 26 July – Ross Cronjé, rugby union player
- 30 July – Wayne Parnell, cricketer
- 2 August – Vanes-Mari Du Toit, netball player
- 2 August – Rudy Paige, rugby player
- 3 August – Themba Zwane, football player
- 5 August – Darren Keet, footballer
- 9 August – Lunga Shabalala, actor & tv personality.
- 18 August – Willie le Roux, rugby player
- 13 September – Jurgen Visser, rugby union player
- 15 September – Nandipha Magudumana, celebrity doctor
- 4 October – Madoda Yako, rugby union player
- 9 October – Rilee Rossouw, cricketer
- 25 October – Lejeanne Marais, figure skater
- 6 November – Cherise Taylor, road cyclist
- 18 December – Thulani Hlatshwayo, South africa national football team captain
- 25 December – Pat O'Brien, rugby union player
- 29 December – Sibusiso Vilakazi, football player

== Deaths ==
- 1 May – David Webster, academic and activist. (b. 1944)
- 22 May – Steven De Groote, classical pianist. (b. 1953)
- 12 September – Anton Lubowski, advocate and secretary-general of SWAPO. (b. 1952)

== Railways ==
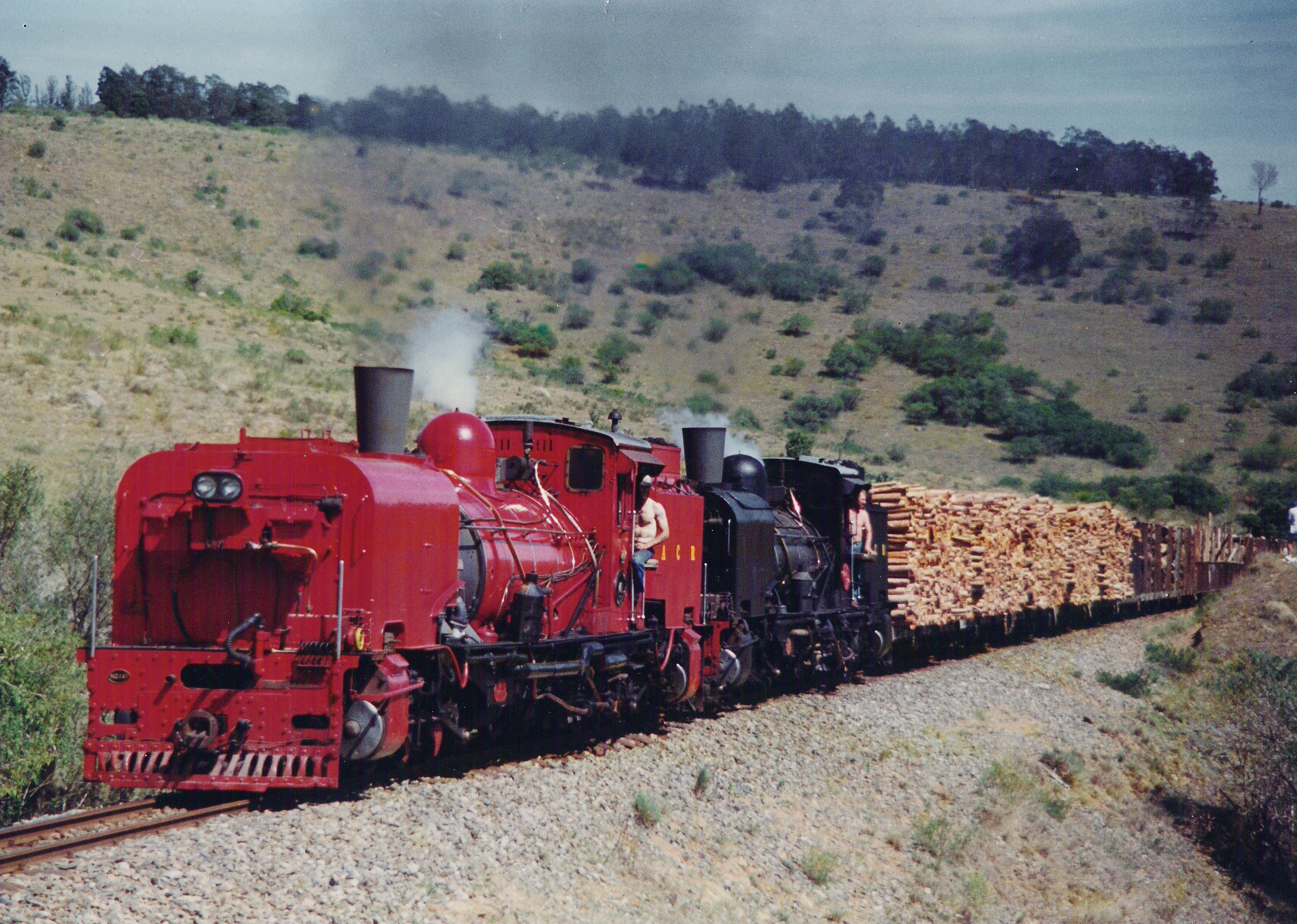
Class NG G16A

=== Locomotives ===
- A Class NG G16 2-6-2+2-6-2 Garratt locomotive is rebuilt to Class NG G16A by the Alfred County Railway.
- The South African Railways places the first of twenty-five Class 10E2 electric locomotives with a Co-Co wheel arrangement in mainline service.

== Sports ==
=== Athletics ===
- 25 February – Willie Mtolo wins his second national title in the men's marathon, clocking 2:13:13 in Port Elizabeth.
