= Alberto Mazzoncini =

South African cricketer

Alberto Mazzoncini (born 14 February 1991) is a South African cricketer. He is a left-handed batsman and left-arm medium-pace bowler who played for Griqualand West. Between 2009 and 2012, Mazzoncini played six times in First-class cricket, 16 in List A cricket matches and five Twenty20 games.

He was born in Kimberley and attended Diamantveld High School.

Mazzoncini played for Griqualand West Under-19s in the CSA Under-19s competition between January 2008 and December 2009.

Mazzoncini made his first-class debut during the 2009–10 season, against Boland.
