= Faith Nketsi =

South African influencer and model (born 1994)

Mapholoso Faith Nketsi
- Born: Faith Mapholoso Nketsi; 30 December 1994 (age 31); Johannesburg, South Africa
- Education: University of South Africa
- Occupations: Influencer, model, entrepreneur
- Children: Sky Njilo
- Parent(s): Linky Modise, Leonard Nketsi
- Relatives: Kabelo Nketsi
- Modeling information
- Hair color: Dark brown
- Website: faithnketsi.com

Mapholoso Faith Nketsi (born 30 December 1994), is a South African influencer, model and media personality. She is well known for being a member of a dance group in her younger years. After she left the group she became a reality TV star and scored a reality show called Have Faith that airs on MTV and Netflix.She also works with multiple brands and has gained a large social media following.

== Early life and career ==
Faith was born in Johannesburg. She started her career when she was sixteen years old. Faith gained media attention when she was part of a girl hip hop dance crew. She attended the University of South Africa. She appeared in the music video of Cassper Nyovest's single, "Tito Mboweni."

On 30 July 2018, she launched 'Get Snatched', a diet and workout programme.

In November 2019, Nketsi starred in her own reality show called "#HaveFaith" which premiered on MTV Africa in South Africa, making her the first woman with her own reality show on the channel. Faith has over 1.3 million Instagram followers as of December 2019.

Faith launched her own music career in 2019, working with DJ Maphorisa. Her first EP, Disrespectful, has seven tracks and is produced by Blaqboy Music.

== Personal life ==
Faith is a social media influencer with 3.3 million followers on Instagram. She is one of South Africa's most popular influencers. She was married to a businessman Nzuzo Njilo on 10 April 2022-2023. Faith has since become a mother.
