= South African Class 10E1, Series 2 =

Type of electric locomotive

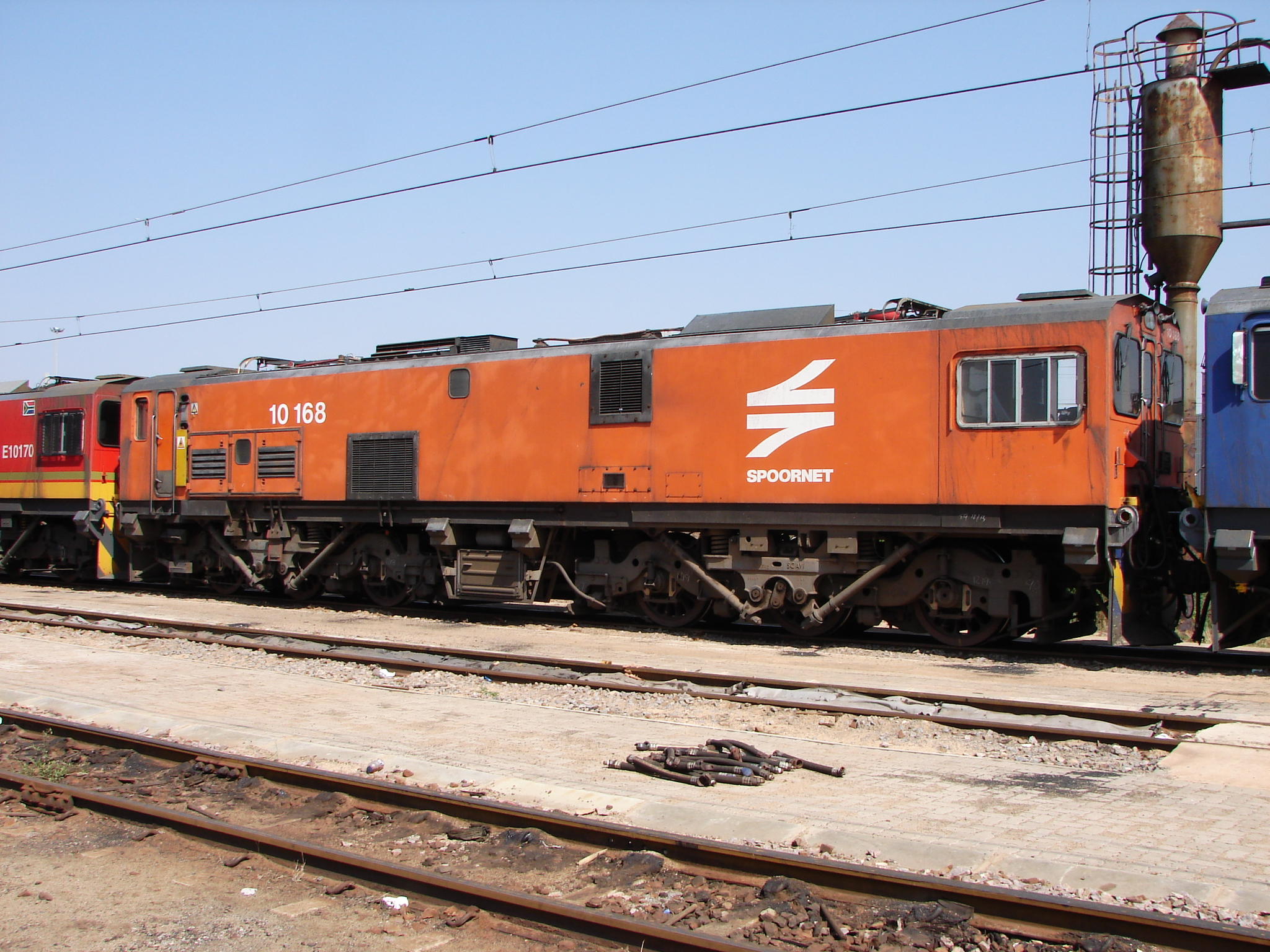
- 10-168 at Pyramid South, 22 September 2015
Type and origin
- Power type: Electric
- Designer: General Electric Company
- Builder: Union Carriage & Wagon
- Serial number: 5739-5788
- Model: GEC 10E1
- Build date: 1990-1993
- Total produced: 50
Specifications
- Configuration
  - AAR: C-C
  - UIC: Co'Co'
  - Commonwealth: Co-Co
- Gauge: 3 ft 6 in (1,067 mm) Cape gauge
- Wheel diameter: 1,220 mm (48.03 in)
- Wheelbase: 13,460 mm (529 7/8 in)
  - Bogie: 4,060 mm (13 ft 3 7/8 in)
- Pivot centres: 10,200 mm (33 ft 5 5/8 in)
- Panto shoes: 12,000 mm (39 ft 4 1/2 in)
- Length
  - Over couplers: 18,520 mm (60 ft 9 1/8 in)
  - Over body: 17,506 mm (57 ft 5 1/4 in)
- Width: 2,906 mm (9 ft 6 3/8 in)
- Height
  - Pantograph: 4,120 mm (13 ft 6 1/4 in)
  - Body height: 3,945 mm (12 ft 11 3/8 in)
- Axle load: 21,210 kg (46,760 lb)
- Adhesive weight: 126,000 kg (278,000 lb)
- Loco weight: 126,000 kg (278,000 lb)
- Electric system/s: 3 kV DC catenary
- Current pickup: Pantographs
- Traction motors: Six GEC G425AZ
  - Rating 1 hour: 540 kW (720 hp)
  - Continuous: 515 kW (691 hp)
- Gear ratio: 17:87
- Loco brake: Air, Regenerative & Rheostatic
- Train brakes: Air & Vacuum
- Couplers: AAR knuckle
Performance figures
- Maximum speed: 90 km/h (56 mph)
- Power output
  - 1 hour: 3,240 kW (4,340 hp)
  - Continuous: 3,090 kW (4,140 hp)
- Tractive effort
  - Starting: 450 kN (100,000 lbf)
  - 1 hour: 335 kN (75,000 lbf)
  - Continuous: 310 kN (70,000 lbf) @ 35 km/h (22 mph)
- Brakeforce: 175 kN (39,000 lbf) @ 15–45 km/h (9–28 mph); 2,187 kN (492,000 lbf) @ 45–100 km/h (28–62 mph)
Career
- Operators: Spoornet; Transnet Freight Rail
- Class: Class 10E1
- Number in class: 50
- Numbers: 10-126 to 10-175
- Nicknames: Breadbin
- Delivered: 1990-1992
- First run: 1990

The Spoornet Class 10E1, Series 2 of 1990 is a South African electric locomotive.

Between 1990 and 1992, Spoornet placed fiftyClass 10E1, Series 2 electric locomotives with a Co-Co wheel arrangement in mainline service.

== Manufacturer ==
The 3 kV DC Class 10E1, Series 2 electric locomotive was designed for the South African Railways (SAR) by the General Electric Company (GEC) and built by Union Carriage & Wagon (UCW) in Nigel, Transvaal. GEC supplied the electrical equipment while UCW was responsible for the mechanical components and assembly.

UCW delivered fifty locomotives to Spoornet between 1990 and 1992, numbered in the range from 10-126 to 10-175. Contrary to prior UCW practice, GEC works numbers were allocated to the Class 10E1 locomotives. With the exception of the Class 9E, also a UCW-built GEC locomotive, UCW did not allocate builder’s numbers to previous locomotives it built for the SAR or Spoornet, but used the SAR or Spoornet unit numbers for their record keeping.

== Characteristics ==
The Class 10E1 was introduced as a new standard 3 kV DC heavy goods locomotive. With a continuous power rating of 3,090 kilowatts (4,144 horsepower), four Class 10E1 units are capable of performing the same work as six Class 6E1 units.

=== Brakes ===
The entire Class 10E1 fleet features electronic chopper control, which is smoother in comparison to the rheostatic resistance control which was used in the Classes 1E to 6E1 electric locomotives.

The locomotive makes use of either regenerative or rheostatic braking, as the situation demands. Both traction and electric braking power are continuously variable, with the electric braking optimised to such an extent that maximum use will be made of the regenerative braking capacity of the 3 kV DC network, with the ability to automatically change over to rheostatic braking whenever the overhead supply system becomes non-receptive.

=== Bogies ===
The Class 10E1 was built with sophisticated traction linkages on the bogies. Together with the locomotive's electronic wheel-slip detection system, these traction struts, mounted between the linkages on the bogies and the locomotive body and colloquially referred to as grasshopper legs, ensure the maximum transfer of power to the rails without causing wheel-slip by reducing the adhesion of the leading bogie and increasing that of the trailing bogie by as much as 15% upon starting.

=== Orientation ===
This dual cab locomotive has a roof access ladder on one side only, immediately to the right of the cab access door. The roof access ladder end is marked as the no. 2 end. In visual appearance, the Series 1 and Series 2 locomotives are virtually indistinguishable from each other.

== Service ==
Most of the Class 10E1 locomotives were placed in service at Nelspruit and Ermelo in Mpumalanga. In 1998 a number of Spoornet’s electric locomotives and most of their Class 38-000 electro-diesel locomotives were sold to Maquarie-GETX (General Electric Financing) and leased back to Spoornet for a ten-year period which was to expire in 2008. Of the Class 10E, Series 2, numbers 10-136 to 10-173 were included in this leasing deal.

== Liveries ==
The Class 10E2, Series 2 introduced the new Spoornet orange livery with a yellow and blue chevron pattern on the cowcatchers. In the late 1990s at least one was repainted in the Spoornet blue livery with outline numbers on the long hood sides. After 2008 in the Transnet Freight Rail (TFR) era, several received the TFR red, green and yellow livery.

== Illustration ==
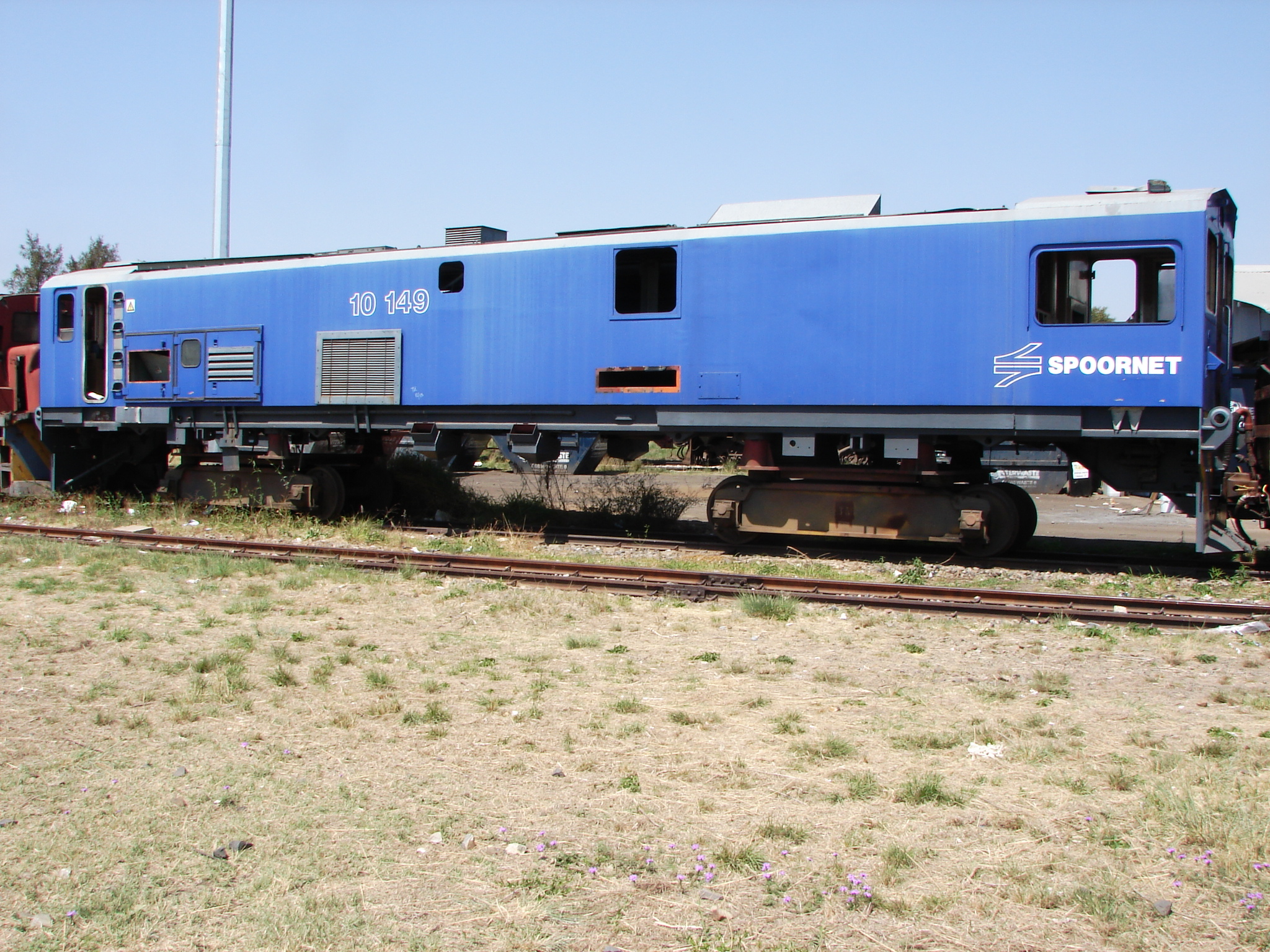
No. 10-149 in Spoornet blue livery with outline numbers, on shop bogies at Koedoespoort, Pretoria, 29 September 2015

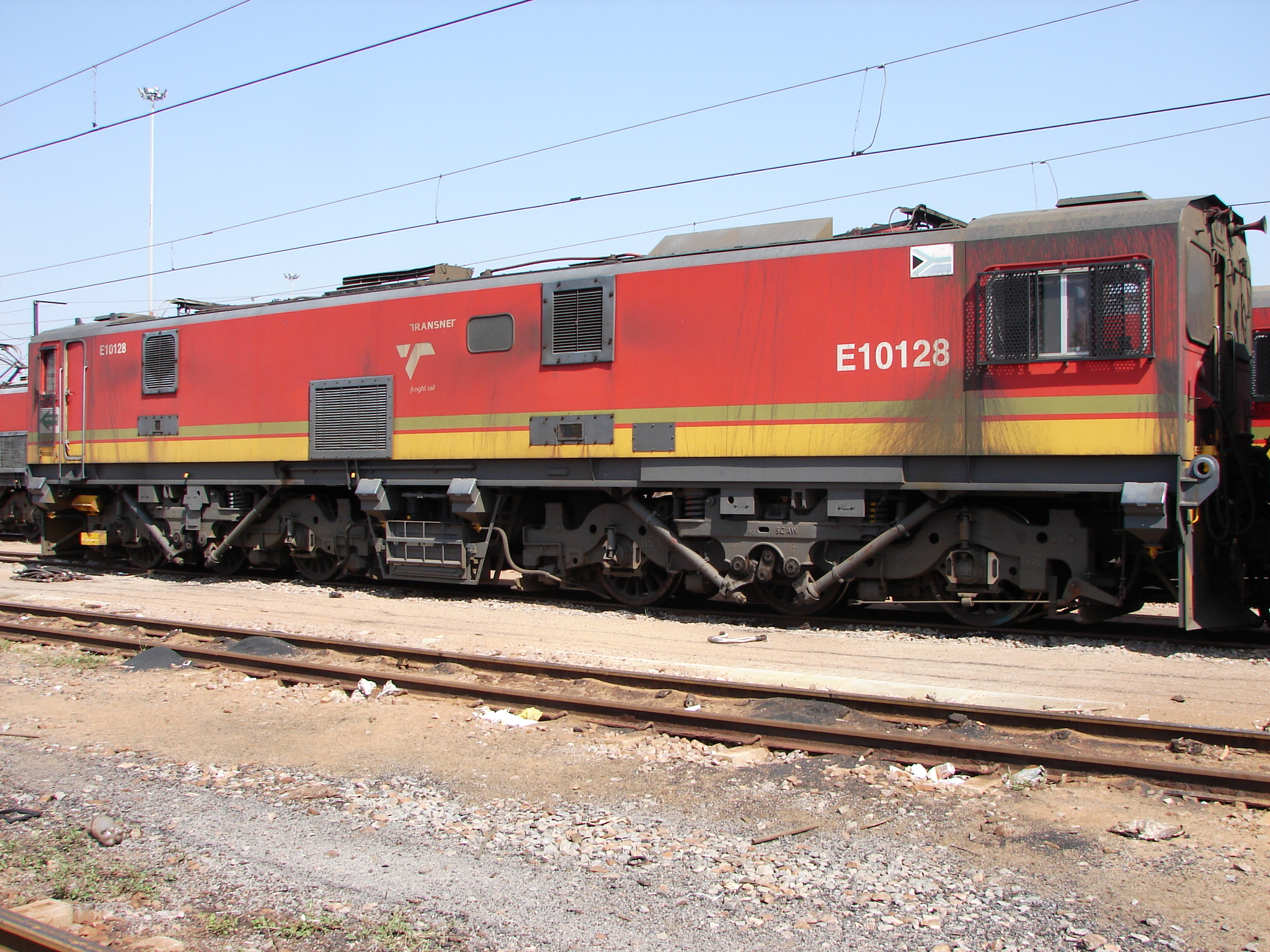
No. 10-128 in Transnet Freight Rail livery at Pyramid South, Pretoria, 22 September 2015
