= Paraffin Safety Association of Southern Africa =

Paraffin Safety Association
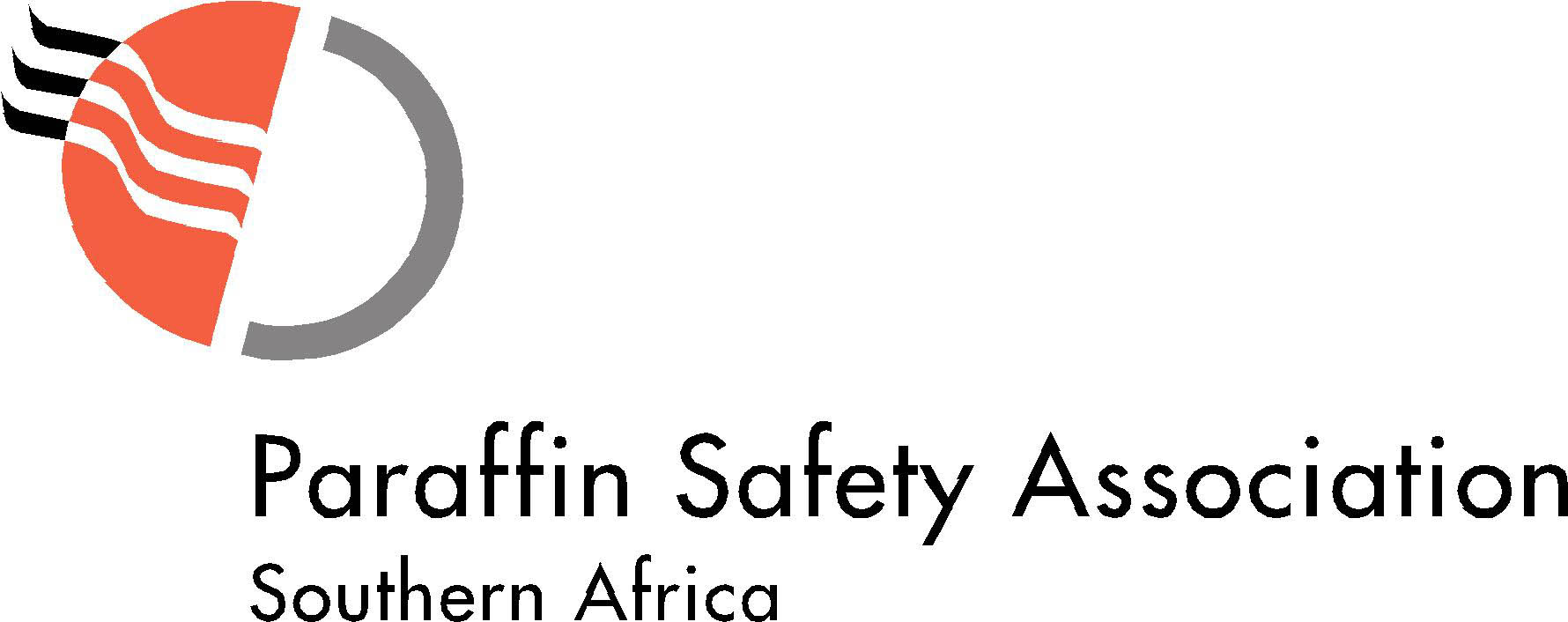
- Founded: 1996
- Type: Non-profit organization
- Legal status: Section 21 company
- Purpose: Safe use of paraffin in domestic environment
- Location: Head Office Cape Town, South Africa
- Region served: Nationwide South Africa
- Method: Training & Education, Campaigns, Media
- Key people: Patrick Kulati, Managing Director
- Website: The Paraffin Safety Association

The Paraffin Safety Association of Southern Africa (also known as PASASA) is a non-profit organization that is dedicated to ensuring the safe use of paraffin in the domestic environment. PASASA was founded in 1996 by the petroleum industry of South Africa as a response to high incidents of paraffin incidents and poisoning amongst children at that time. PASASA is headquartered in Cape Town, South Africa and has offices in Durban, King William’ Town and Pretoria, South Africa. The goal of Paraffin Safety Association of Southern Africa is three-fold:

1. Provide training and educational material to paraffin users though a network of partnerships. These include NGOs community groups, emergency and healthcare workers, herbalists or any other group or individual who can effectively disseminate safety information. It has trained a corps of master trainers who will train and provide educational material in 11 official languages to these community partners.

2. Work with industry, regulatory organisations and other bodies to set safety standards and lobbying government to have these made mandatory. Now that government has gazetted legislation on stove standards, the Paraffin Safety Association is focussing on packaging standards to ensure paraffin is sold in clearly marked, childproof containers.

3. Compile a knowledge base about the domestic use of paraffin and its consequences by conducting incidence surveillance, research, and collating and interpreting all available information.

== Provincial presence ==
In 2003 the Paraffin Safety Association of Southern Africa decided to extend its interventions beyond the head office in Cape Town so that there could be a provincial presence and projects across the country. In 2004, two provincial offices were opened in Durban and Johannesburg. The Johannesburg office moved to Pretoria in October 2008. The PASASA strategy in provinces is to select an area whose community uses paraffin as their main source of energy, do a baseline survey on this community and then design an intervention programme based on the results of the survey. These programmes are termed Area Specific Interventions (ASIs) at PASASA. As at January 2011, PASASA had ten ASIs in eight provinces of South Africa and works with them for a period of a year and half before moving to the next ASI.

== Programmes and activities ==
=== Public Communications Programme (PCP) ===
The purpose of the Public Communications programme is to coordinate all media, publications and communications projects of PASASA. The main aim is to make PASASA visible and audible and also to streamline communication messages across the whole organisation, ensuring that there are no ambiguities to our messaging. Our ultimate goal is to develop communication strategies for PASASA to deal with our various stakeholders.

=== Community Engagement Programme (CEP) ===
The Community Engagement Programme is to interface with communities, local authorities, and energy and paraffin users on the ground. This is done by delivering on community awareness, education, and training and information dissemination projects. Interactive interaction with local hospitals, mortuaries and clinics to collect household energy related injury data as part of our surveillance system. It is to lobby and advocate amongst local councilors and provincial governments and other stakeholders to ensure household energy safety. It is to establish partnerships to ensure that interventions and legacy are sustained. It is to deepen the implementation of our Area Specific Interventions. Conduct social and scientific surveillance work.

=== Scientific, Technical, Education, Research and Industry Programme (STER) ===
The purpose of this programme is to coordinate and conduct researched solutions to the Household energy safety problems. STER's purpose is to participate in the development of new paraffin fuel and appliance standards. And also deals with packaging and labeling issues. STER also handles all technical issues like dealing with the Technical Advisory Committee (TAC) of the South African Petroleum Industry Association (SAPIA). STER's partners are hospitals, clinics and SABS enforcement of standards. The ultimate goal for STER is to establish an Industry Association for safe Household Energy appliances.

The programmes above will be broken down into the following Service Delivery projects:

==== Safer Systems Project ====
This project is to ensure that all household appliances are safe and meet specific regulatory requirements.

==== Surveillance for Impact System ====
The surveillance for impact system deals with burns and injury surveillance in hospitals and countries across the country.

==== Research Projects ====
PASASA in collaboration with GTZ recently did a study to inform stakeholders regarding the market potential for safe paraffin appliances in South Africa.

==== Education Projects ====
Working with service departments like Disaster management and The Department of Health to train their staff on paraffin safety.

== Achievements and awards ==
2009 - The first non-pressure stove is granted homologation against the SANS 1906:2006 standard for non-pressure paraffin stoves and heaters.
2008 - PASASA is included by the National Regulator for Compulsory Specifications in its newly established committee to oversee the enforcement of paraffin appliance regulations.
2007 - Winner of NSTF Award 2006/2007 for outstanding contributions to science, engineering and technology.
2006 - Finalist in the National Science and Technology Forum Awards.
2005 - Winner of the Department of Trade and Industry Award for Consumer Champions.
