= Ngoako Ramatlhodi =

South African politician

The Honourable Ngoako Ramatlhodi MP

1st Premier of Limpopo
- In office 10 May 1994 – 22 April 2004

Deputy Minister of Correctional Services
- In office 1 November 2010 – 25 May 2014
- President: Jacob Zuma

Minister of Mineral Resources
- In office 25 May 2014 – 23 September 2015
- President: Jacob Zuma

Minister of Public Service and Administration
- In office 23 September 2015 – 31 March 2017
- President: Jacob Zuma
- Deputy: Godfrey Oliphant
- Preceded by: Susan Shabangu
- Succeeded by: Mosebenzi Zwane

Personal details
- Born: 21 August 1955 (age 70) Northern Transvaal, South Africa
- Party: African National Congress

Ngoako Ramatlhodi (born 21 August 1955), a senior member of the African National Congress, was South Africa's Minister of Public Service and Administration from 2015 to March 2017. In the first Zuma administration he had been an MP and a controversial member of the Judicial Service Commission. He resigned as MP in 2017.

Up to 2015 he was Minister of Mineral Resources. Ramatlhodi claimed in 2017 that Eskom chairperson Ben Ngubane and chief executive Brian Molefe requested that he terminate Glencore's mining licenses in an apparent ruse to facilitate the sale of its Optimum coal mine to the Gupta family. He was assigned to his subsequent ministerial post after he supposedly did not comply.

He was dismissed in the cabinet reshuffle of March 2017, allegedly without being given reasons. His position was taken by a known Zuma ally, the then Free State economic development MEC Mosebenzi Zwane. In the same reshuffle, finance minister Pravin Gordhan and his deputy, Mcebisi Jonas, were also replaced. He was appointed Prime Minister of the Bapedi Nation in December 2024 by Queen Manyaku "Hlapogadi 'a Phaahle" Leganabatho II Thulare. He is the first person to hold the office aimed at improving relations between government and the royal house and nation.
