= Popo Molefe =

South african politician

1st Premier of North West
- In office 1994 – 2004
- Preceded by: New position
- Succeeded by: Molewa, B.E.E.

Chairman of the board of PetroSA
- In office 2002–2010
- Preceded by: New position
- Succeeded by: Mokaba, A.M.B.

Chairman of the board of PRASA
- In office 2014–2017
- Preceded by: Buthelezi, S.
- Succeeded by: Kweyama, K.

Chairman of the board of Transnet
- In office 2018 – in office
- Preceded by: Mabaso, L

Personal details
- Born: Popo Simon Molefe; 26 April 1952 (age 74) Sophiatown, Gauteng, South Africa
- Party: African National Congress
- Spouse(s): Plaatjie, B.

Popo Simon Molefe OLS (born 26 April 1952) is a businessman and former politician from South Africa.

== Early life ==
One of eight children, Molefe was the son of a laborer and a domestic worker, though he was raised largely by one of his aunts, Sanah Tsatsimpe. He attended Naledi High School in Soweto. He became involved in political activism as a student, joining the Black People's Convention in 1973, and the South African Students' Movement in 1974. While a member of the latter organization, he participated in the Soweto Uprising of 1976.

Molefe is a member of the Methodist Church of South Africa.

== Political involvement ==
Molefe was one of the founding members of the Azanian People's Organization at its formation in 1978 and became the first chairman of the Soweto branch in 1979. He left the group in 1981 as a result of a dispute over the role of white Africans in the anti-apartheid movement, and the following year he became one of the Committee of Ten within the Soweto Civic Association, serving in that capacity until 1984. He also was involved with the founding of the United Democratic Front in January 1983. In August 1983, he became the UDF's National General-Secretary.

Molefe was arrested on several occasions as a result of his political activities. A 1985 arrest resulted in three years of detention without bail, followed by court proceedings in the Delmas Treason Trial. At the end of that trial, Molefe was one of eleven men convicted of anti-apartheid activities, and he drew a prison sentence of ten years from Judge van Dijkhorst, the second-longest sentence among the men convicted. His sentence was overturned by the Supreme Court of South Africa in 1989.

Following his release from prison, Molefe became a member of the newly-legalized African National Congress. After advancing through various party offices, he became Premier of the North West Province in 1994. He held this position until April 2004, when he resigned from politics citing a desire to tend to his "personal health and family".

== Business appointments ==
- In July 2004 - Anooraq Resources Corporation, a platinum mining and exploration company, as co-non-executive chairperson.
- In August 2004 - Chancellor of North-West University.
- PetroSA - Chairman of the Board of Directors - 2002-2010
- Chancellor House - Trustee
- PRASA - Chairman of the Board of Directors - 2014-2017
- Transnet - Chairman of the Board of Directors - since May 2018

== Marriage ==
Molefe was married to Boitumelo "Tumi" Plaatje, with whom he had four children. The couple divorced in 2003, after she alleged that he had molested his ten-year-old daughter. Molefe denied the accusations, and attributed them to what he termed Plaatje's "unstable history of making false allegations". Police investigated Plaatje's claim but declined to prosecute, citing a lack of sufficient evidence.
