= 1985 in South Africa =

- Decades: 1960s; 1970s; 1980s; 1990s; 2000s
- See also: List of years in South Africa

The following lists events that happened during 1985 in South Africa.

== Incumbents ==
- State President: P.W. Botha.
- Chief Justice: Pieter Jacobus Rabie.

== Events ==
January

- 31 – State President P.W. Botha offers a release proposal to imprisoned African National Congress deputy leader Nelson Mandela.
- 31 – Dr Gerrit Viljoen, Minister of Cooperation and Development, announces that the forced removal of Blacks will be suspended.
- Three guerrillas and a policeman are killed in a skirmish near Nongoma.

February

- 9 – An explosion damages the Old Defence Force offices in Marshall Street, Johannesburg.
- 10 – Nelson Mandela rejects P.W. Botha's offer of conditional release.
- 28 – Denis Goldberg is released from custody of Apartheid government after spending 22 years in white prison.

March

- 21 – An estimated 47 people are killed in the Langa massacre when police open fire on a crowd at the twenty-fifth commemoration of the Sharpeville Massacre demonstration marches in Langa, Port Elizabeth.
- 22 – Two guerrillas are killed in Bosbokrand.
- 27 – Over 200 people are arrested for marching through Cape Town to Pollsmoor Prison protesting for the release of Nelson Mandela, including two clerics who led the march, Beyers Naudé and Allan Boesak.
- A Limpet mine destroys a police vehicle in Mamelodi.
- Two guerrillas are killed and one captured in the Eastern Transvaal.
- A special branch policeman's home in Tembisa comes under grenade attack.

April

- 15 – South Africa ends the ban on interracial marriages.
- 30 – The Rand Daily Mail, a leading anti-apartheid newspaper, ceases publication.

May

- 2 – An explosion rocks the building housing the gold mining companies of Anglo American and Anglovaal in Johannesburg and causes R170,000 in structural damage. Both companies are engaged in mass dismissals of mine workers.
- 8 – The Disappearance of Pebco Three and subsequently murdered same year
- 9 – Two grenade attacks occur in Pretoria townships.
- 15 – Three explosions damage the Brakpan Police barracks.
- 15 – Insurgents attack the buildings of the Brakpan Commissioners court and offices of the Messenger of the court.
- 15 – The funeral of Andries Raditsela, an Umkhonto we Sizwe member who had died in detention, takes place.
- 28 or 30 – A Limpet mine causes structural damage to the Military Medical Centre in Hillbrow, Johannesburg.
- 31 – Insurgents attack the Southern Cross Fund offices and injure 14 people.

June

- 14 – The South African Army raids houses and offices of Umkhonto we Sizwe during Operation Plecksy in Gaborone, Botswana, killing 12 activists.
- Three limpet mines explode at the Natalia Development Board buildings in Lamontville.
- Three limpet mines explode at the Umlazi Police station in Durban.
- An Eskom sub-station in Durban is damaged by explosion.
- A bomb damages the offices of AECI, which is involved in a labour dispute.
- An explosion destroys a Transkei Development Corporation bulk fuel depot in Umtata and disrupts water and power supplies to the town.
- Insurgents throw petrol bombs and hand grenades at the home of Amichand Rajbansi.
- A policeman who fired on a crowd is killed by alleged insurgents in Mmabatho.
- 27 – The Assassination of The Cradock Four.

July

- 2–6 – The African National Congress holds their second national consultative conference in Kabwe, Zambia.
- 20 – P.W. Botha declares a state of emergency in 36 magisterial districts.
- Limpet mines destroy a sub-station in Durban.
- A Soweto group, dubbed the Suicide Squad, attacks the homes of two Soweto policemen.
- A hand grenade is thrown at a bakery in Umlazi, Durban, where workers are on strike.
- A hand grenade is thrown at the former community councillor in Gugulethu.
- Two insurgents and a policeman are killed in a shootout at a police roadblock near East London.

August

- 1 – Anti-Apartheid lawyer Victoria Mxenge is assassinated by government-backed "death squads".
- 2 – Two insurgents and a policeman are killed at a roadblock near Mount Ruth.
- 10 – Police defuses a limpet mine found on a petrol bowser at a fuel depot in East London.
- 15 – P.W. Botha delivers his infamous "Rubicon Speech" at the opening of the National Party Natal Congress in Durban during a policy address in which he was widely expected to announce new reforms, but instead refuses to bow to pressure for concessions to the black majority or the release of Nelson Mandela.
- 27 – In reaction to the Rubicon speech on 15 August, the Rand falls from 52c US to 33c US against the US dollar.
- 27 – Government closes the foreign exchange markets and stockmarket for a week while trying to reschedule the country's international debt, which fails. International debt is not repaid for four months.
- A hand grenade is thrown into the home of MP Barend Andrews.
- A hand grenade is thrown into the home of a Mamelodi policeman.
- Three limpet mines explode in department stores in Durban, causing limited damage but no injuries.
- A bomb explodes in a night club at an Umlazi hotel and 30 children are injured.
- August – In Queenstown, Eastern Cape, Bill Mentoor becomes the first person to be necklaced by having a petrol-filled car tyre placed around his neck and set alight.

September

- 27–28 – Limpet mines damage the basement of OK Bazaars in Smith Street, Game Stores and Checkers, all supermarkets in central Durban, while a limpet mine is defused in Spar in central Durban.
- Trevor Manuel is detained by police and is subsequently banned until 1990, but the ban was to be lifted in 1986.

October

- 15 – Three Coloured youths are killed and 15 others wounded during the 'Trojan Horse Massacre' when South African security force members, hiding in the back of an unmarked truck, ambush and open fire on a stone-throwing crowd in the township of Athlone, Cape Town. The incident is captured by an international television crew and broadcast across the world.
- 24 – A limpet mine detonates whilst being armed at Grosvenor Girls School, Bluff, Durban, killing Zinto Cele, Mandlenkosi Ndimande and injuring Sibusiso Mazibuko.
- 30 – Parliamentary by-elections are held for five seats. The National Party retains four seats and loses the fifth to the Herstigte Nasionale Party.
- The home of an Umlazi school headmaster is attacked with a hand grenade.

November

- 17 – The Queenstown Massacre, 2000 residents from Mlungisi township in Queenstown, Eastern Cape, gathered in Nonzwakazi Methodist Church.
- 25 – An "Aeroflot" Antonov AN-12 cargo airplane, en route from Cuito Cuanavale to Luanda, is shot down by South African Special Forces and crashes approximately 43 km of Menongue, killing 8 crew members and 13 passengers on board.
- Four people are killed in 20 hand grenade attacks in the Cape Town region.
- A bomb damages a central Johannesburg building housing the Institute of Bankers.
- Sasol 2 and 3 come under rocket attack and three insurgents are killed by police.
- An anti-tank mine explodes in the Soutpansberg area and four defence force members and four civilians are injured.
- Four guerrillas are killed and two injured by Bophutatswana Police.
- A hand grenade explodes at a Barclays National Bank branch in Woodstock, Cape Town.

December

- 8 – The Chesterville home of a policeman is bombed.
- 13 – A South African Army anti-mine troop carrier detonates an anti-tank mine in Messina and one soldier is injured.
- 14 – A guerrilla is killed in Chiawelo.
- 15 – Five people are killed, three of them children aged two, eight and ten, and five are injured when their vehicle detonates an anti-tank mine on the Chatsworth farm near Messina. A one-year-old boy survives the blast.
- 17 – A limpet mine explodes at 03h00 and damages eight PUTCO buses at the Fleetline depot in Umlazi, Durban.
- 19 – A farmer is injured when his vehicle hits an anti-tank mine in the Weipe area.
- 20 – The South African Army carries out a raid into Maseru, Lesotho.
- 21 – A limpet mine attached to minibus injures 8 or 13 people.
- 23 – A bomb explodes in an Amanzimtoti shopping centre, kills five people and injures 40 others. Andrew Zondo, who is later arrested for planting the bomb, claims that he attempted to warn the mall but failed. He was later hanged.
- 29 – The police defuses a pamphlet bomb in Durban.
- A limpet mine explodes at 18h00 and causes structural damage to the Chatsworth Magistrates Court outside Durban.
- A grenade is thrown at a tourist kombi in central Durban.

Unknown date

- George Bizos becomes a judge on Botswana's Court of Appeal.
- The Delmas Treason Trial starts, with the State vs Mosiuoa Lekota and Popo Molefe.
- Mimi Coertse receives the Decoration for Meritorious Service in recognition of her contribution to the Arts.
- Bulelani Ngcuka is released from prison.
- Bulelani Ngcuka joins the human rights branch of the International Labour Organization in Geneva, Switzerland.

== Births ==
- 31 January – Stephen Mokoka, long-distance runner
- 7 February – Donald Moatshe, musician
- 21 February – Dada Masilo, dancer and choreographer (d. 2024)
- 6 March – Godfrey Khotso Mokoena, olympics long jump and triple jump silver medalist
- 6 March – Pretty Yende, soprano singer
- 19 March – Tats Nkonzo, standup comedian, singer, musician and television personality
- 11 April – Lance Davids, football player
- 12 April – Enrico James, badminton player
- 22 May – Tsepo Masilela, football player
- 23 May – Hlompho Kekana, football player
- 28 May – Megan Coleman, Miss South Africa 2006
- 7 June – Zikhona Sodlaka, actress
- 8 June – Pierre Spies, rugby player
- 15 June – Francois Louw, rugby player
- 4 June – Vernon Philander, cricketer
- 3 July – Colin Ingram, cricketer
- 26 July – Da L.E.S, South African-American hip hop musician
- 5 August – Thishiwe Ziqubu, actress
- 15 August – Lerato Chabangu, football player
- 21 August – Roelof Dednam, badminton player
- 14 October – Ryan Kankowski, rugby player
- 15 October – Khanyi Mbau, actress, TV host
- 30 October – Zodwa Wabantu, media personality, socialite and dancer
- 12 November – Innocent Mdledle, football player
- 18 November – Adriaan Strauss, rugby player
- 20 November – IFani, recording hip hop artist and engineer
- 22 November – Jenna-Anne Buys, figure skater

== Deaths ==
- 3 May – Cythna Letty, botanical artist and author. (b. 1895)
- 21 May – Vernon Nkadimeng, Umkhonto We Sizwe member. (b. 1958)
- 14 June – Thamsanga Mnyele, artist and activist. (b. 1948)
- 27 June –
  - Matthew Goniwe, political activist (b. 1947)
  - Sicelo Mhlauli, political activist (b. 1949)
  - Sparrow Mkhonto, political activist (b. 1951)
  - Fort Calata, political activist (b. 1956)
- 1 August – Victoria Mxenge, political activist (b. 1942)

== Railways ==
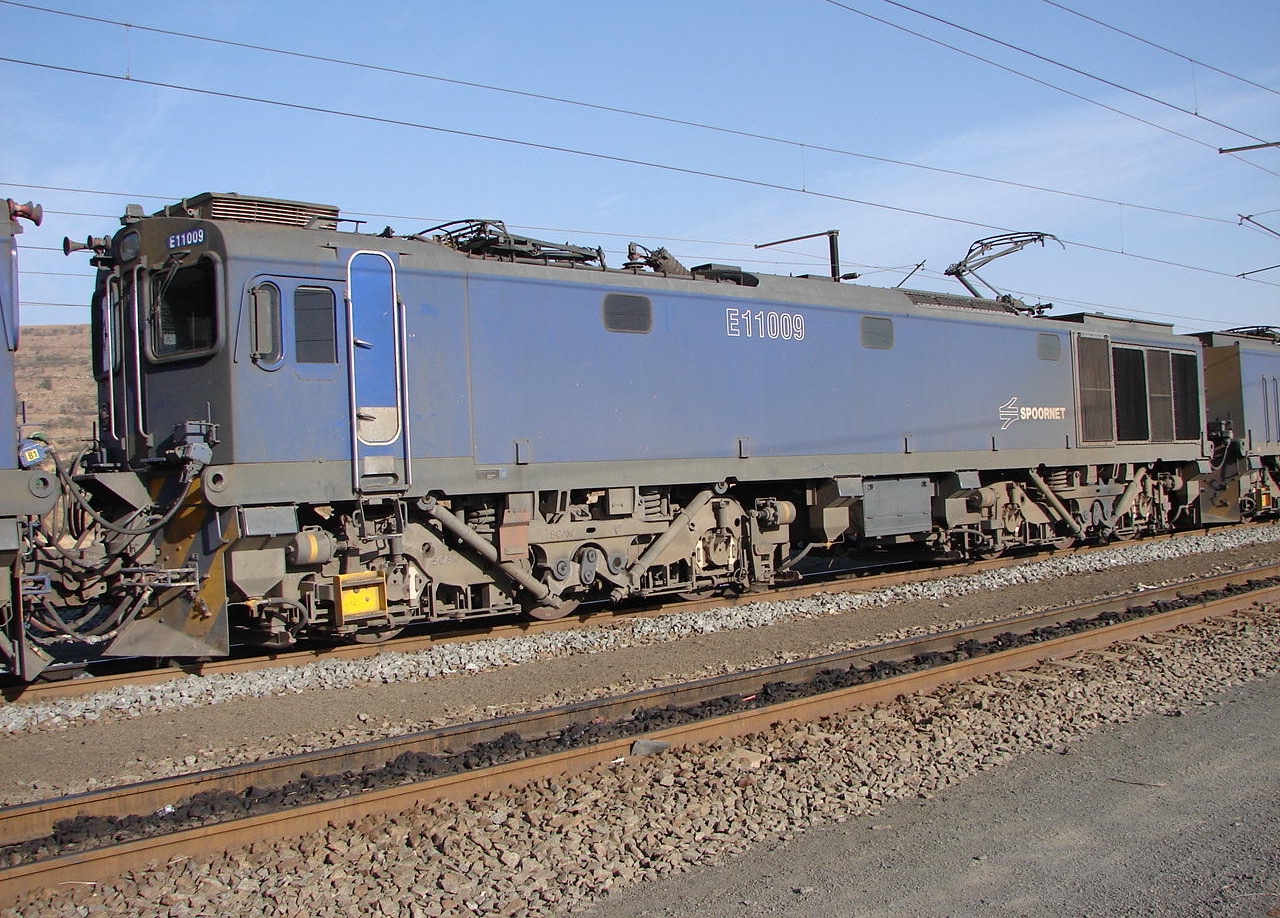
Class 11E

=== Locomotives ===
Two new Cape gauge locomotive types enter service on the South African Railways:

- The first of fifty 3 kV DC Class 10E electric locomotives.
- The first of forty-five 25 kV 50 Hz AC Class 11E electric locomotives on the Coalink line to the Port of Richards Bay.

== Sports ==
=== Athletics ===
- 4 May – Mark Plaatjes wins his second national title in the men's marathon, clocking 2:08:58 in Port Elizabeth.

=== Motorsport ===
- 19 October – The South African Grand Prix takes place at Kyalami.
