= 1986 in South Africa =

- Decades: 1960s; 1970s; 1980s; 1990s; 2000s
- See also: List of years in South Africa

The following lists events that happened during 1986 in South Africa.

== Incumbents ==
- State President: P.W. Botha.
- Chief Justice: Pieter Jacobus Rabie.

== Events ==
January

- 4 – Two people are killed and two others injured when their vehicle detonates an anti-tank land mine at Stockpoort in the Ellisras area, not far from the Botswana border.
- 5 – A policeman and an insurgent are killed at a police roadblock on the East London-King William's Town road.
- 7 – A grenade is thrown at a Railways policeman in Soweto.
- 8 – A Pretoria sub-station is damaged by an explosion.
- 9 – A limpet mine explodes at 21h15 and damages a substation in Jacobs, Durban. Later a second limpet explodes, killing a policeman and injuring other policemen and two electrical workers who arrive at the scene.
- 18 – Two limpet mines damage a sub-station in Westville, KwaZulu-Natal.
- 20 – A coup d'état, led by Major General Justin Lekhanya, deposes Lesotho's prime minister Leabua Jonathan and re-instates King Moshoeshoe II in power.
- 20 – African National Congress members based in Lesotho are deported to Zambia.
- 20 – Four limpet mines damage an electrical pylon near Durban at 20h45. A fifth mine, probably aimed at the police and repair crew, explodes later with no injuries.
- 24 – Police Sergeant Makhulu is killed in a grenade attack on his home in Mamelodi.
- 31 – During the opening of Parliament State President P.W. Botha outlines government policy on the restoration of South African citizenship to Blacks.
- A Soweto man throws a grenade at three policemen and is killed when the policemen retaliate.

February

- 2 – A soldier and a cadre are killed near Alldays.
- 4 – Four South African Army soldiers are injured when a cadre throws a grenade into their military vehicle at Gugulethu.
- 9 – A limpet mine destroys two police vehicles at Umlazi police station near Durban when parked after returning from riot patrol.
- 10 – A large bomb is defused by police in Amanzimtoti, 200 m from where the December 1985 blast took place for which Andrew Zondo was hanged.
- 12 – A pick-up detonates an anti-tank mine near Messina, with no injuries.
- 16 – A police Casspir detonates an anti-tank land mine in Mamelodi.
- 17 – Two policemen and two cadres are killed while one is arrested in Zwide.
- 19 – An explosion in a toilet block near the radio control room at the Cambridge East police station causes no injuries.
- An explosion occurs at a Durban sub-station.
- At De Deur a limpet mine causes structural damage to a sub-station.
- A hand grenade explodes in a Transkei minister's official car.

March

- 3 – Seven black men, the Gugulethu Seven, are killed in a confrontation with police in Gugulethu.
- 4 – An explosion on the 3rd floor of John Vorster Square injures two policemen and two civilians.
- 7 – A limpet mine is found at the Hillbrow Police Station and is safely detonated by police.
- 7 – A State of Emergency that lasted eight months is lifted by the government.
- 11 – Lowveld massacre: South African apartheid army and police forces opened fire on students attending a trial in the Kabokweni magistrate court, with fatalities among the casualties.
- 12 – Esther Masuku, mother of youth activist and SACC member Oupa Masuku, is killed in a hand grenade attack on their house in Atteridgeville, Pretoria.
- 12 – The Eminent Persons Group meets imprisoned African National Congress leader Nelson Mandela.
- 15 – A limpet mine explodes in front of the Springs railway station, seriously injuring one person.
- 17 – A mini-limpet is discovered at the Afrikaans high school at Elsburg, Germiston and is safely detonated.
- 18 – Police Constable Sinki Vuma is shot dead at his home in Mamelodi.
- 19 – A car belonging to a special branch policeman is destroyed by a limpet mine.
- 19 – A bomb blast occurs inside the property of the Springs New Apostolic Church.
- 21 – Four mines explode at an Escom sub-station in Durban.
- 25 – Trevor Manuel's ban is lifted.
- 26 – A Vosloorus man is killed by police when he throws a grenade at them.
- Police come under fire at a funeral in Dobsonville.

April

- 8 – The home of the former Labour Party secretary in Natal, Kevin Leaf, is attacked.
- 10 – A person is killed and four injured when a limpet mine explodes at Braamfontein station in Johannesburg.
- 11 – Peter Nchabeleng, regional president of the United Democratic Front, dies in police custody in Schoonoord, Lebowa.
- 18 – Two people are killed and several others are injured when a bomb explodes at the Wild Coast Casino at Bizana in the Eastern Cape Province. The African National Congress denies responsibility. Phumzile Mayaphi would be charged, found guilty of murder and sabotage and sentenced to death on 12 May 1989.
- 21 – Two anti-tank landmines detonate in the Breyten-Chrissiesmeer district, injuring two people in a taxi and one tractor driver.
- 21 – A cadre is seriously injured when he and others attack the police in Alexandra, Gauteng.
- 23 – An explosion occurs at the Cala post office.
- 24 – An explosion occurs at the Meyerspark post office.
- 27 – Gordon Webster, under arrest in Edendale hospital, is aided to escape by Robert McBride and other Umkhonto we Sizwe insurgents, who kill an innocent bystander and injure the two policemen who are guarding Webster.

May

- 1 – Two grenades are thrown at the home of Mr. Klein, principal of Wentworth Primary School. Klein and his wife are both injured.
- 7 – A bomb explosion causes extensive damage to Benmore Gardens Shopping Centre, Sandton.
- 25 – A vehicle detonates an anti-tank mine on the farm of Colonel Koos Durr near Davel. Two civilians are killed and eight injured.
- 26 – A tractor detonates a second anti-tank mine on the farm of Colonel Koos Durr, this time with no injuries.
- Police finds a 15 kg bomb under a car in downtown Durban and defuses it.

June

- 5 – Botswana, Mozambique, South Africa and Zimbabwe agree to the establishment of the Limpopo Basin Permanent Technical Committee.
- 6 – Former minister of KaNgwane David Lukhele and his sister-in-law are murdered by uMkhonto weSizwe's Neo Griffith Potsane, Jabu Obed Masina and Frans "Ting Ting" Masango.
- 10 – A vehicle detonates an anti-tank mine on the farm Boshoek, 5 km from Volksrust, and injures one person.
- 10 – On another farm, Blomhof, also near Volksrust, an anti-tank mine injures two farm workers.
- 12 – The Government declares a nationwide state of emergency.
- 14 – A car bomb explodes outside the "Magoo's" and "Why Not" bars on the Durban beach-front bombing beachfront, killing three and injuring 69 civilians. Robert McBride would later be sentenced to death for the bombing but would be granted amnesty by the ANC government and appointed in several successive senior government positions.
- 16 – A probable anti-tank mine explosion kills three Bophuthatswana Defence Force troops in a troop carrier in the Winterveldt region.
- 22 – Limpet mines damage fuel storage tanks and a liquid fuel pipeline at the Mobil Refinery near Durban.
- 22 – A limpet mine explodes at 01h45 outside a Copper Shop on West Street, Durban.
- 24 – An explosion at 14h00 injures 16 civilians at a Wimpy Bar fast-food restaurant on Rissik Street, Johannesburg.
- 27 – At a police roadblock near the Botswana border four cadres are killed and one policeman injured.
- 28 – An explosion just before 12h00 injures two people in a Queenstown shopping centre.
- 29 – An explosion occurs at the Alice post office.
- 30 – A limpet mine explodes at 03h15 on a pedestrian bridge in Westville, Durban and a second limpet aimed at responding policemen explodes 15 minutes later.
- A bomb explodes at Jabulani Amphitheatre in Soweto, with no injuries.
- Ten people are killed in an explosion in a minibus in Bophuthatswana.

July

- 1 – An explosion outside the Carlton Hotel in Johannesburg injures eight civilians.
- 4 – A limpet mine explodes outside Checkers supermarket in Silverton, Pretoria and injures 20 civilians.
- 5 – An explosion at the Mowbray police station in Cape Town slightly injures two policemen.
- 5 – One civilian is injured when a vehicle detonates an anti-tank land mine near Volksrust.
- 5 – In Vosloorus and Katlehong, five Development Board officials are killed in two attacks on their vehicles and two insurgents are killed in the return fire.
- 6 – Police kill three cadres and arrest one in Empangeni.
- 9 – Piet Ntuli, Minister of Home Affairs of KwaNdebele, is killed by a car bomb explosion in KwaNdebele.
- 10 – An explosion injures seven civilians in Silverton.
- 10 – Police and members of the South African Defence Force ambush and kills 6 cadres near Alldays.
- 22 – A policeman is killed in Katlehong.
- 23 – Passbook laws are relaxed to counter the escalating international condemnation
- 28 – Two cadres are killed near Nelspruit.
- 30 – The Umtata Police station comes under attack and three policemen and four innocent bystanders are killed.
- 30 – A vehicle detonates an anti-tank landmine near Nelspruit.
- During a two-hour gun battle in Mdantsane police kill an insurgent.

August

- 3 – An explosion occurs at the Lakeside post office.
- 15 – Trevor Manuel is detained for the second time, this time only to be released in 1988.
- 16 – Four cadres are killed and one injured in the eastern Transvaal, near the Swaziland border.
- 17 – A vehicle detonates an anti-tank landmine on the farm Stellen Rust near Nelspruit, killing five and injuring two civilians.
- 22 – Inkatha Freedom Party member Winnington Sabelo comes under grenade attack and Umkhonto we Sizwe terrorists fire at the car of his wife as she enters the driveway, killing her and injuring three children.
- 24 – In Imbali the home of town councilor Austin Kwejama comes under grenade attack and one child is killed and another injured.
- 26 – In White City Soweto, between 20 and 25 residents were shot and killed by police, over 60 wounded and four police were wounded. The shootings occurred after officials tried to evict residents participating in a rent boycott. The following day, a Black Town Councilor was hacked to death in retaliation.

September

- 1 – A bomb explodes at the Pick and Pay supermarket in Montclair, Durban and injures one civilian.
- 4 – Police broke up multiple mass funeral services for the victims of the 26 August massacre with tear gas, armored vehicles, and helicopters. A woman was reported killed, and many injured.
- 7 – Desmond Tutu becomes the first black Anglican Church bishop in South Africa.
- 7 – A car bomb explodes not far from The Star's Seaside Home in Durban, a holiday home for underprivileged children.
- 24 – The home of Soweto Housing Director, Del Kevin, is extensively damaged by a limpet mine.
- 30 – A Northern Natal policeman is injured in an attack.
- A mini-limpet mine explodes in the bar of the Devonshire Hotel, a popular venue for Wits students, injuring three civilians.
- A grenade is thrown into a crowded night club in Edenpark, Alberton.

October

- 1 – The South African Railways Police is dissolved and its assets, personnel, and functions are transferred to the South African Police.
- 6 – Six soldiers are injured when their military vehicle detonates an anti-tank mine at Mbuzini near the Mozambique border.
- 9 – Police Lieutenant Victor Raju is killed in a grenade attack on his home in Durban.
- 19 – President Samora Machel of Mozambique dies when his Tupolev Tu-134 aircraft flies into the ground near Mbuzini in South Africa.
- 20 – A limpet mine explodes outside the Lamontville Police station.
- 22 – Two anti-tank landmine explosions occur.
- 31 – Detective Warrant Officer Seleka is killed in a grenade attack on his home.
- The police station in Newcastle is attacked.

November

- 2 or 4 – An anti-tank landmine explosion kills one woman and injures a child near Nelspruit.
- 4 – A landmine kills a soldier on horseback in the eastern Transvaal.
- 10 – Two bombs explode at the Newcastle Magistrates Court, injuring 24 people including the Magistrate and Public Prosecutor.
- 13 – The system of Pass laws was formally repealed
- 14 – A landmine injures a farmer and his son in the Alldays district.
- 23 – A limpet mine explodes at Fordsburg flats, new housing for Soweto town councillors.
- Two offices of PUTCO bus company are bombed in Soweto after a fare increase of 17.5% is announced.

December

- 15 – A police vehicle detonates an anti-tank mine in the Barberton area, injuring the two occupants.
- 19 – An anti-tank landmine injures defence force members in the Komatipoort area.
- 19 – A grenade attack is executed on the home of a Soweto councillor and two policemen are injured.
- 27 – Three cadres and two policemen are killed near Messina.

== Births ==
- 2 January – Refilwe Modiselle, South Africa's first professional fashion model with albinism
- 7 February – Jenna Dreyer, diver
- 10 February – Christine Kalmer, long-distance runner
- 25 February – Eric Macheru, actor
- 16 March – Bernard Parker, football player
- 21 March – Kerry-Lee Harrington, badminton player
- 6 April – Bryce Moon, football player
- 25 April – Waylon Murray, rugby player
- 5 May – Bokang Montjane, Miss World Africa at Miss World 2011.
- 20 May – Riaan Fitzgeald, Creative Designer
- 23 May – Thanduyise Khuboni, football player
- 27 May – Thuso Phala, football player
- 3 June – Lwazi Mvovo, rugby player
- 15 June – Dann-Jacques Mouton, actor
- 19 June – Lady Zamar, singer
- 3 July – Duane Vermeulen, rugby player
- 8 July – Zandre Labuschagne, artistic gymnast
- 12 July – JP Pietersen, Springbok rugby player
- 21 July – Heinrich Brüssow, rugby player
- 19 August – Lehlohonolo Majoro, football player
- 28 August – Justin Pietersen, figure skater
- 11 September – Chiliboy Ralepelle, rugby player
- 18 November – James Thompson (rower), olympics gold medalist rower
- 4 October – Andries Venter, rugby league and rugby union footballer
- 29 October – Katlego Maboe, TV presenter, singer-songwriter
- 22 November – Oscar Pistorius, Paralympic athlete
- 27 December Thulani Stokwe, Stokwe Ndlela Royal Family Secretary, Pan Africanist, Home economist.

== Deaths ==
- 8 March – Moses Mabhida, general secretary of the South African Communist Party. (b. 1923)
- 24 December – Richard van der Riet Woolley, astronomer and director of South African Astronomical Observatory. (b. 1906)

== Sports ==
=== Athletics ===
- 3 May – Zithulele Sinqe wins his first national title in the men's marathon, clocking 2:08:04 in Port Elizabeth.
