= South African Class 38-000 =

1992 design of electro-diesel locomotive

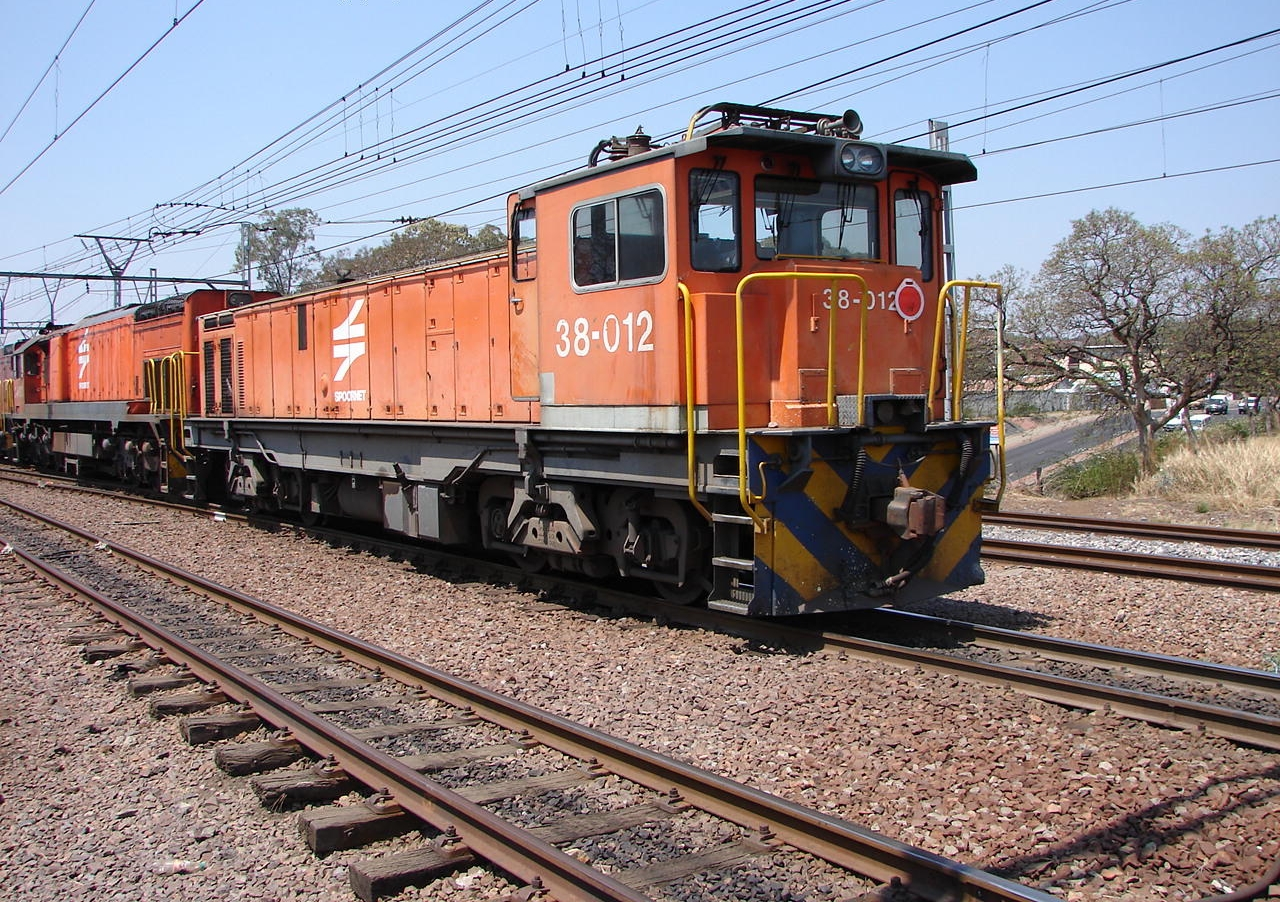
- No. 38-012 at Capital Park, 28 September 2006
Type and origin
- Power type: Electro-diesel
- Designer: Consortium, led by Siemens
- Builder: Union Carriage & Wagon
- Serial number: 38-001 to 38-050
- Model: Consortium Class 38
- Build date: 1992-1993
- Total produced: 50
Specifications
- Configuration
  - AAR: B-B
  - UIC: Bo'Bo'
  - Commonwealth: Bo-Bo
- Gauge: 3 ft 6 in (1,067 mm) Cape gauge
- Wheel diameter: 1,054 mm (41 1/2 in)
- Wheelbase: 11,700 mm (38 ft 4 5/8 in)
  - Bogie: 2,600 mm (8 ft 6 3/8 in)
- Pivot centres: 9,100 mm (29 ft 10 1/4 in)
- Length
  - Over couplers: 16,314 mm (53 ft 6 1/4 in)
- Width: 2,780 mm (9 ft 1 1/2 in)
- Height
  - Pantograph: 4,130 mm (13 ft 6 5/8 in)
- Axle load: 18,685 kg (41,193 lb)
- Adhesive weight: 74,740 kg (164,770 lb)
- Loco weight: 74,740 kg (164,770 lb) max
- Fuel type: Diesel
- Fuel capacity: 2,000 litres (440 imp gal; 530 US gal)
- Electric system/s: 3 kV DC catenary
- Current pickup(s): Pantograph
- Prime mover: Caterpillar DITA 3508
- RPM range: 600-1,800
  - RPM idle: 600
  - Maximum RPM: 1,800
- Engine type: 4-stroke diesel
- Alternator: 6 pole ABB/WB450C6
- Traction motors: Four AC 6 pole ABB/6FRA5252
  - Continuous: 378 kW (507 hp)
- MU working: 4 maximum
- Loco brake: Knorr-Bremse air brake Spring applied, air release parking
- Train brakes: Knorr-Bremse W450/150-3 compressor LPS 94 DE-MAG Wittig exhauster
- Couplers: AAR knuckle type E
Performance figures
- Maximum speed: 100 km/h (62 mph)
- Power output
  - Starting: 780 kW (1,050 hp) diesel
  - Continuous: 1,500 kW (2,000 hp) electric 600 kW (800 hp) diesel
- Tractive effort
  - Starting: 260 kN (58,000 lbf) @ 35% adh.
  - Continuous: 180 kN (40,000 lbf) @ 30 km/h (19 mph) electric @ 10 km/h (6.2 mph) diesel
- Factor of adh.
  - Starting: 35%
  - Continuous: 25%
- Brakeforce: 1,500 kW (2,000 hp) regenerative 1,000 kW (1,300 hp) dynamic
Career
- Operators: Spoornet; Transnet Freight Rail
- Class: Class 38-000
- Number in class: 50
- Numbers: 38-001 to 38-050
- Delivered: 1992-1994
- First run: 1992

The Spoornet Class 38-000 of 1992 is a South African electro-diesel locomotive.

Between 1992 and 1994, Spoornet placed fifty Class 38-000 dual mode locomotives in service. They are still the only dual powered electro-diesel locomotives in use by Transnet Freight Rail, capable of running either on 3 kV DC electricity off the catenary or on diesel fuel alone.

== Manufacturer ==
The 3 kV DC Class 38-000 electro-diesel locomotive was designed for Spoornet by Consortium under the leadership of Siemens and was built by Union Carriage & Wagon (UCW) in Nigel, Transvaal.

Fifty locomotives entered service between 1992 and 1994, numbered in the range from 38-001 to 38-050. UCW did not allocate builder's or works numbers to the locomotives it built for Spoornet, but used the Spoornet unit numbers for their record keeping.

== Characteristics ==
The locomotive has two-station controls. For operation in the diesel-only mode it was powered by a 780 kilowatts (1,050 horsepower) Caterpillar type DITA 3508 prime mover. Its diesel-only ability allows it to pick up and shunt wagons from unelectrified industrial sidings.

== Service ==
The Class 38-000 was designed as a multi-purpose locomotive to replace steam on pickup work on the Witwatersrand, but it was also capable of long distance mainline work. Most of the locomotives were initially allocated to Gauteng depots at Germiston, Pyramid South and Krugersdorp with a lone locomotive serving at Bloemfontein in the Free State. Given that they were originally designed for shunting and hauler work, these locomotives have performed extremely well in multiple roles.

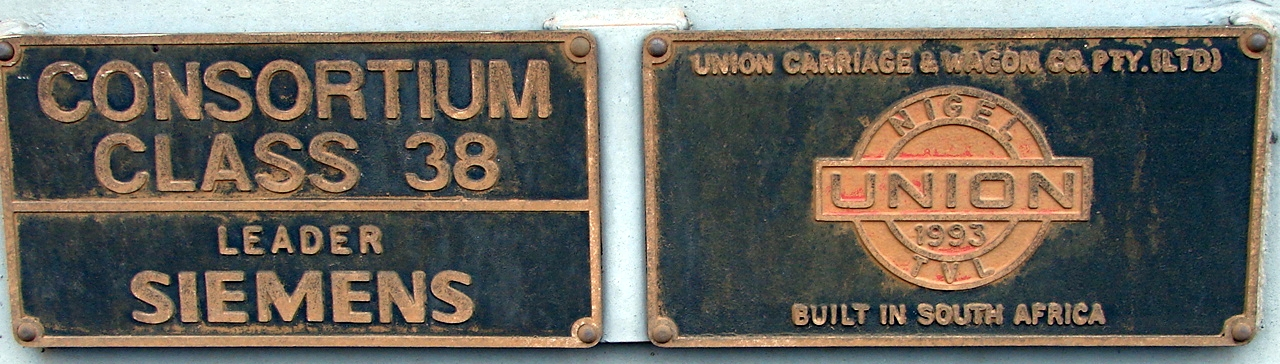
Builder's plates on No. 38-040

Shortly after entering service they were used to haul the "Witblitz" shipping container express train between Johannesburg and Cape Town. This saved time by avoiding the need to change locomotives at Beaufort West and Kimberley to negotiate the 25 kV AC section between these two centres, since it could be traversed in diesel-only mode even though the units are less powerful in that mode.

Although the Class 38-000 is usually limited to a top speed of 100 kilometres per hour (62 miles per hour), the "Witblitz" regularly attained speeds of 120 kilometres per hour (75 miles per hour) on some sections. The "Witblitz" express trains have long been discontinued, but some of the 120 km/h speed limit boards were still in existence between Potchefstroom and Worcester as late as 2005.

For many years, the Class 38-000 also became the prime motive power on trains 5558 and 5559, the PX speed-freight overnight container trains between Durban Goods and Johannesburg's City Deep. It was found that the Class 10E electric locomotives previously used on this duty could not achieve the 140 kilometres per hour (87 miles per hour) speeds at which these fifty-wagon trains were booked. These trains were the Natal Corridor (NATCOR) equivalent of the "Witblits" trains.

In 1998, forty of these locomotives, numbers 38-011 to 38-050, and a number of electric locomotives were sold to Maquarie-GETX (General Electric Finance) and leased back to Spoornet for a ten-year period which expired in 2008.

By 2012, Class 38-000 locomotives still often ran with full loads on the mainlines between Broodsnyersplaas and Welgedacht and to the Sentrarand classification yards in Gauteng.

== Dates in service ==
The Class 38-000's years of construction as shown on their builder's plates and dates in service where known are listed in the table.

Class 38-000 build dates and dates in service
Loco no.	Year built	Date in service
38-001	1992	18 Apr 1993
38-002	1992	25 Mar 1993
38-003	1992	10 Sep 1992
38-004	1992	15 Sep 1992
38-005	1992	16 Nov 1992
38-006	1992	25 Mar 1993
38-007	1992	9 Feb 1993
38-008	1992	18 Mar 1993
38-009	1992	27 Jan 1993
38-010	1992	9 Feb 1993
38-011	1992	7 Apr 1993
38-012	1992	19 May 1993
38-013	1992	23 Mar 1993
38-014	1992	2 Apr 1993
38-015	1992	15 Apr 1993
38-016	1992	5 Apr 1993
38-017	1992	22 Apr 1993
38-018	1992	3 May 1993
38-019	1992	19 May 1993
38-020	1992	2 Jun 1993
38-021	1992	Jun 1993
38-022	1992	11 Jun 1993
38-023	1992	Jul 1993
38-024	1993	Jul 1993
38-025	1993	Jul 1993
38-026	1993	Aug 1993
38-027	1993	Aug 1993
38-028	1993	17 Aug 1993
38-029	1993	Sep 1993
38-030	1993	Sep 1993
38-031	1993	Oct 1993
38-032	1993	Sep 1993
38-033	1993	Oct 1993
38-034	1993	Nov 1993
38-035	1993	Nov 1993
38-036	1993	Nov 1993
38-037	1993	Dec 1993
38-038	1993	Dec 1993
38-039	1993	Dec 1993
38-040	1993	Feb 1994
38-041	1992	Feb 1994
38-042	1993	17 Feb 1994
38-043	1993	Mar 1994
38-044	1993	1994
38-045	1993	1994
38-046	1993	1994
38-047	1993	1994
38-048	1993	1994
38-049	1993	1994
38-050	1993	30 Jul 1994

== Class E38 locomotives ==
During the production of the Class 38-000 for Spoornet, UCW also built three Class E38 electric locomotives for Amcoal Mines for use at the Landau Colliery near Witbank, Mpumalanga. The Class E38 electric locomotive is identical in appearance and dimensions to the Class 38-000, but was designed for 3 kV DC electric operation only.

== Liveries ==
The Class 38-000 was delivered in the Spoornet orange livery with a yellow and blue chevron pattern on the cowcatchers. In the late 1990s at least one, no. 38-041, was repainted in the Spoornet blue livery with outline numbers on the long hood sides. After 2008 in the Transnet Freight Rail (TFR) era, several received the TFR red, green and yellow livery.

== Illustration ==
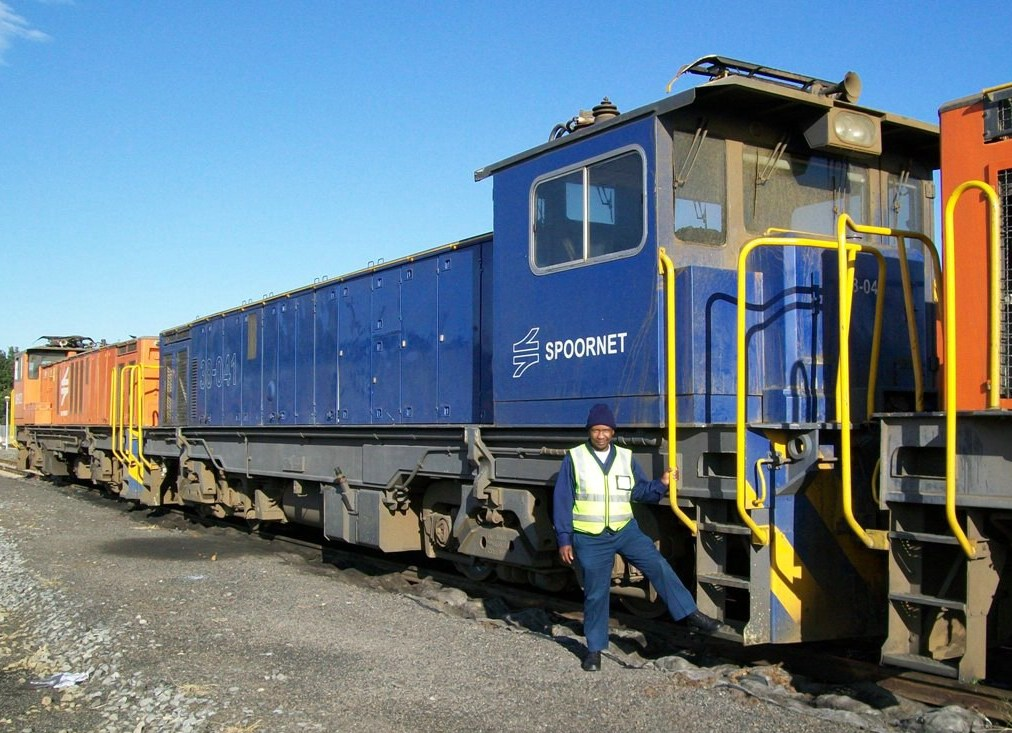
No. 38-041 in Spoornet blue with outline numbers at Leeuhof, Vereeniging, 10 May 2009

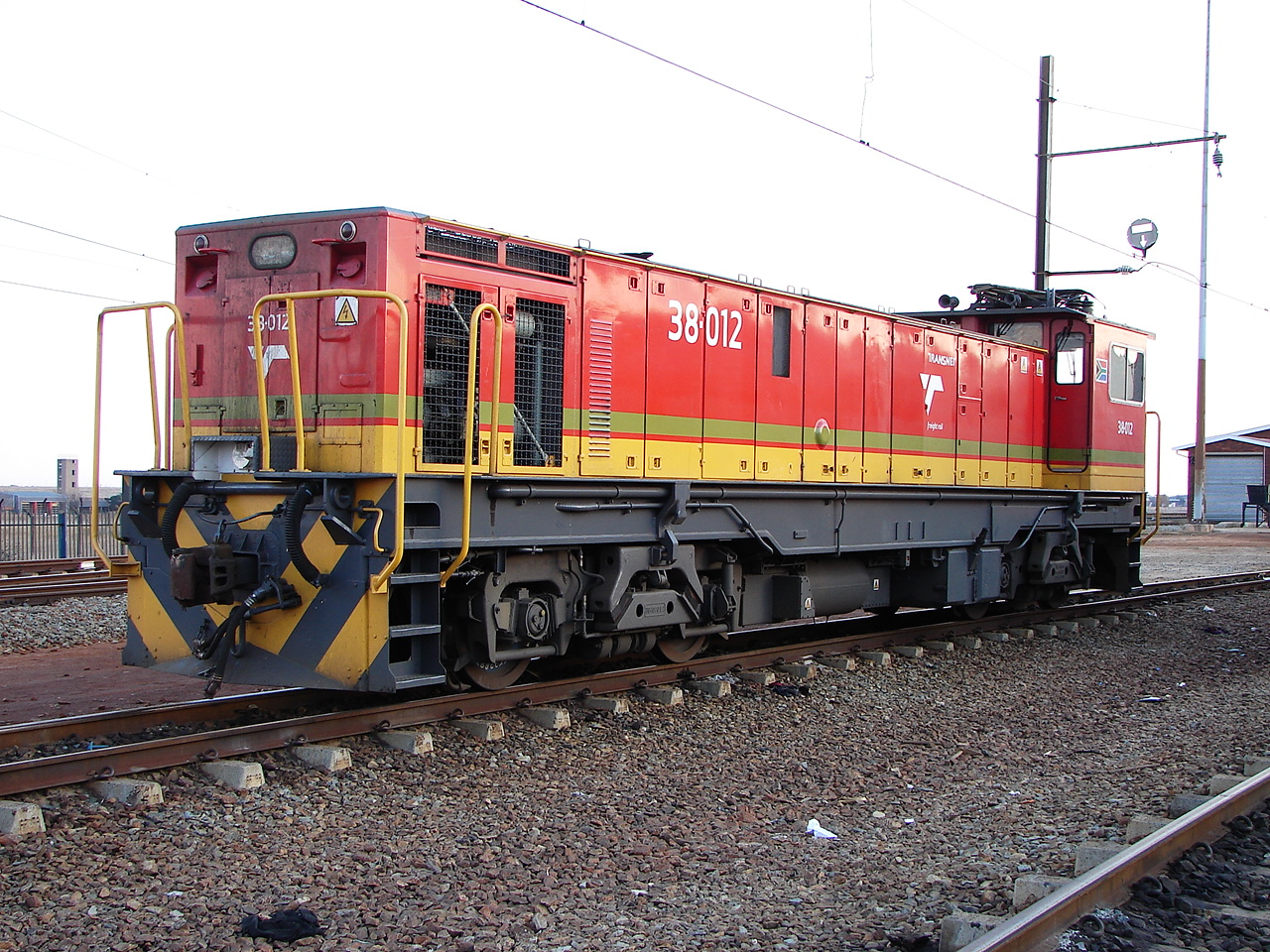
No. 38-012 in Transnet Freight Rail livery at Sentrarand, Gauteng, 18 May 2013
