= South African Class E38 =

South African electric industrial locomotive

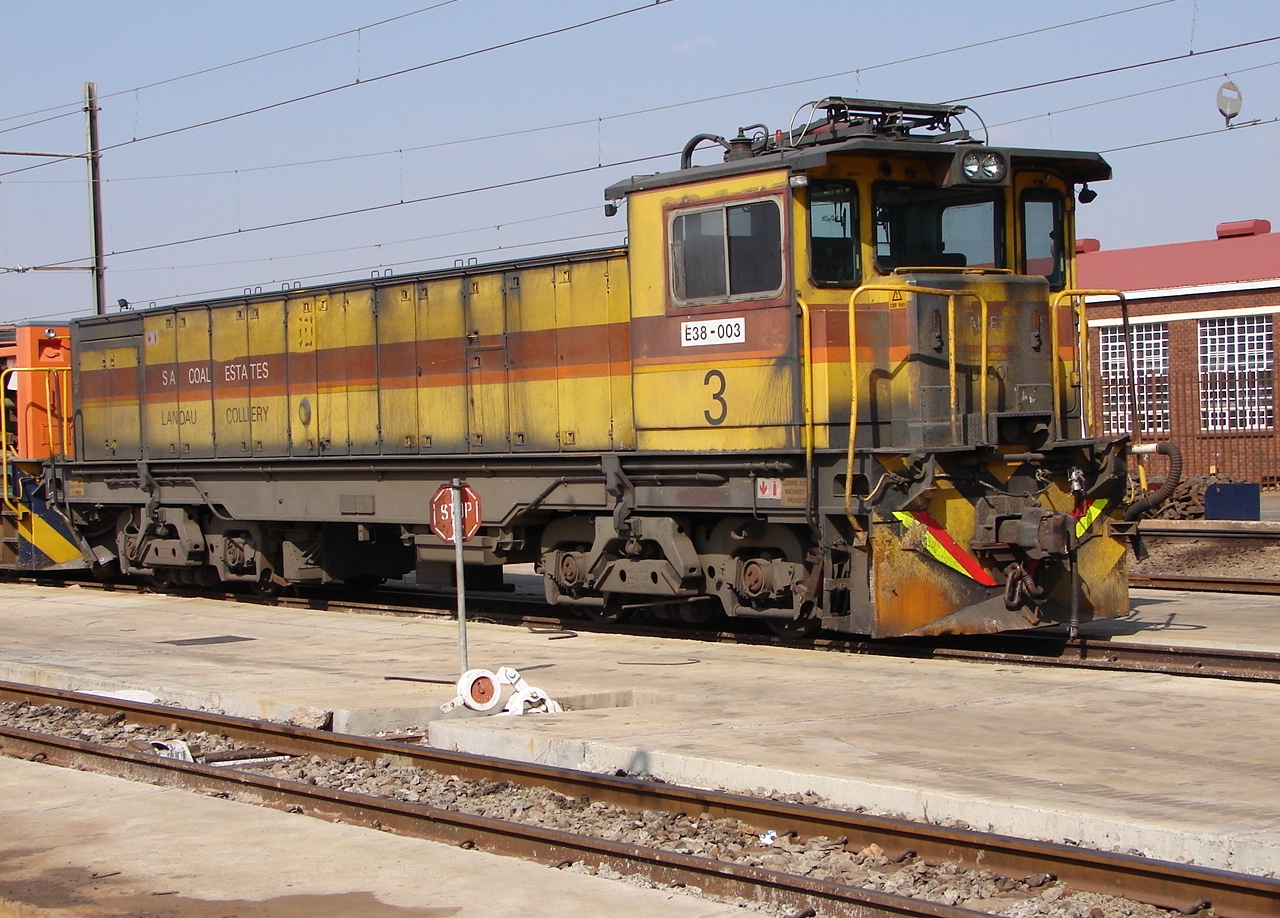
- 38-003 at Sentrarand in September 2009
Type and origin
- Power type: Electric
- Designer: Consortium led by Siemens
- Builder: Union Carriage & Wagon
- Model: Consortium Class E38
- Build date: 1992
- Total produced: 3
Specifications
- Configuration
  - AAR: B-B
  - Commonwealth: Bo-Bo
- Gauge: 3 ft 6 in (1,067 mm) Cape gauge
- Wheel diameter: 1,054 mm (41 1/2 in)
- Wheelbase: 11,700 mm (38 ft 4 5/8 in)
  - Bogie: 2,600 mm (8 ft 6 3/8 in)
- Pivot centres: 9,100 mm (29 ft 10 1/4 in)
- Length
  - Over couplers: 16,314 mm (53 ft 6 1/4 in)
- Width: 2,780 mm (9 ft 1 1/2 in)
- Height
  - Pantograph: 4,130 mm (13 ft 6 5/8 in)
- Electric system/s: 3 kV DC catenary
- Current pickup(s): Pantograph
- Traction motors: Four AC 6 pole ABB/6FRA5252
  - Continuous: 378 kW (507 hp)
- Loco brake: Knorr-Bremse air brake Spring applied, air release parking
- Train brakes: Knorr-Bremse W450/150-3 compressor
- Couplers: AAR knuckle
Performance figures
- Maximum speed: 100 km/h (62 mph)
- Power output
  - Continuous: 1,500 kW (2,000 hp) continuous
- Tractive effort
  - Starting: 260 kN (58,000 lbf) @ 35% adhesion
  - Continuous: 180 kN (40,000 lbf) @ 30 km/h (19 mph)
- Factor of adh.
  - Starting: 35%
  - Continuous: 25%
Career
- Operators: Amcoal; Anglo Coal
- Class: Class E38
- Number in class: 3
- Numbers: E38-001 to E38-003
- Delivered: 1993
- First run: 1993

The Amcoal Class E38 of 1993 is a South African industrial electric locomotive.

In 1993 Amcoal, now Anglo Coal, a wholly owned subsidiary of Anglo American, placed three Class E38 electric locomotives in service at its Kromdraai Colliery near Witbank, Mpumalanga.

== Manufacturer ==
The 3 kV DC Class E38 electric locomotive is an electric-only version of the Class 38-000 electro-diesel locomotive which was designed for Spoornet by a consortium under the leadership of Siemens. In 1992, three of these locomotives were built for Amcoal by Union Carriage & Wagon (UCW) in Nigel, Transvaal.

The locomotives were delivered in 1993 and numbered E38-001 to E38-003. UCW did not allocate builder's numbers to the locomotives it built for Anglo Coal, but used the Amcoal unit numbers for their record keeping.

== Spoornet’s Class 38-000 ==
Prior to the production of the Class E38 for Amcoal Mines, UCW also built fifty Class 38-000 locomotives for Spoornet. The Class 38-000 is a dual mode electro-diesel locomotive, identical in exterior appearance and dimensions to the Class E38 but designed for 3 kV DC electric as well as diesel-electric operation and equipped with a 780 kW (1,050 hp) Caterpillar DITA 3508 diesel prime mover.

== Service ==
The three Class E38s now serve at the Landau Colliery near Witbank.
