= General Motors South Africa =

South African division of General Motors

General Motors South Africa (Pty) Ltd
- Type: Subsidiary
- Industry: Automotive
- Predecessor: Delta Motor (1987–2003); Chevrolet South Africa (1999–2003)
- Founded: 1913 (Note: 2004 (reacquisition).)
- Defunct: 2017; 9 years ago
- Headquarters: Port Elizabeth, South Africa
- Products: Automobiles, diesel locomotives
- Brands: Chevrolet; Opel; Isuzu
- Number of employees: 1,900
- Parent: General Motors

General Motors South Africa (Pty) Ltd , or GMSA, was a wholly owned subsidiary of American automobile manufacturer General Motors. It manufactured and distributed automobiles under the Chevrolet, Opel and Isuzu brands. The deal with Isuzu was approved by the Competition Commission on 27 November 2017. The company was headquartered in Gqeberha (Port Elizabeth), South Africa.

The company also built diesel locomotives from 1974 to 1987.

== History ==
Founded in 1913, GMSA initially distributed Chevrolet vehicles before beginning to manufacture and distribute vehicles of all of GM's brands in 1926, with the Series AA. By the 1960s this included the British Vauxhall marque and the Ranger, marketed as "South Africa's Own Car".

In 1986, it was sold off and rebranded the Delta Motor Corporation as a result of the passage of the Comprehensive Anti-Apartheid Act in the United States and subsequent divestment of General Motors from apartheid South Africa. Delta continued to use the Opel, Isuzu and Suzuki brands under licence from GM as well as pay for the supply of assembly kits.

Following the transition to democracy in the 1990s, GM acquired a 49 percent stake in the company in 1997, and in 2004 the company once again became a wholly owned subsidiary of General Motors, reverting to its original name.

It also assembled vehicles for export to other markets in the region, such as Australia, Zimbabwe, Zambia, Mozambique, Malawi, Kenya, and Mauritius.

General Motors announced its withdrawal from the South African market on 18 May 2017 after GM's top management had informed its workforce and dealers of the decision.

== Passenger cars ==
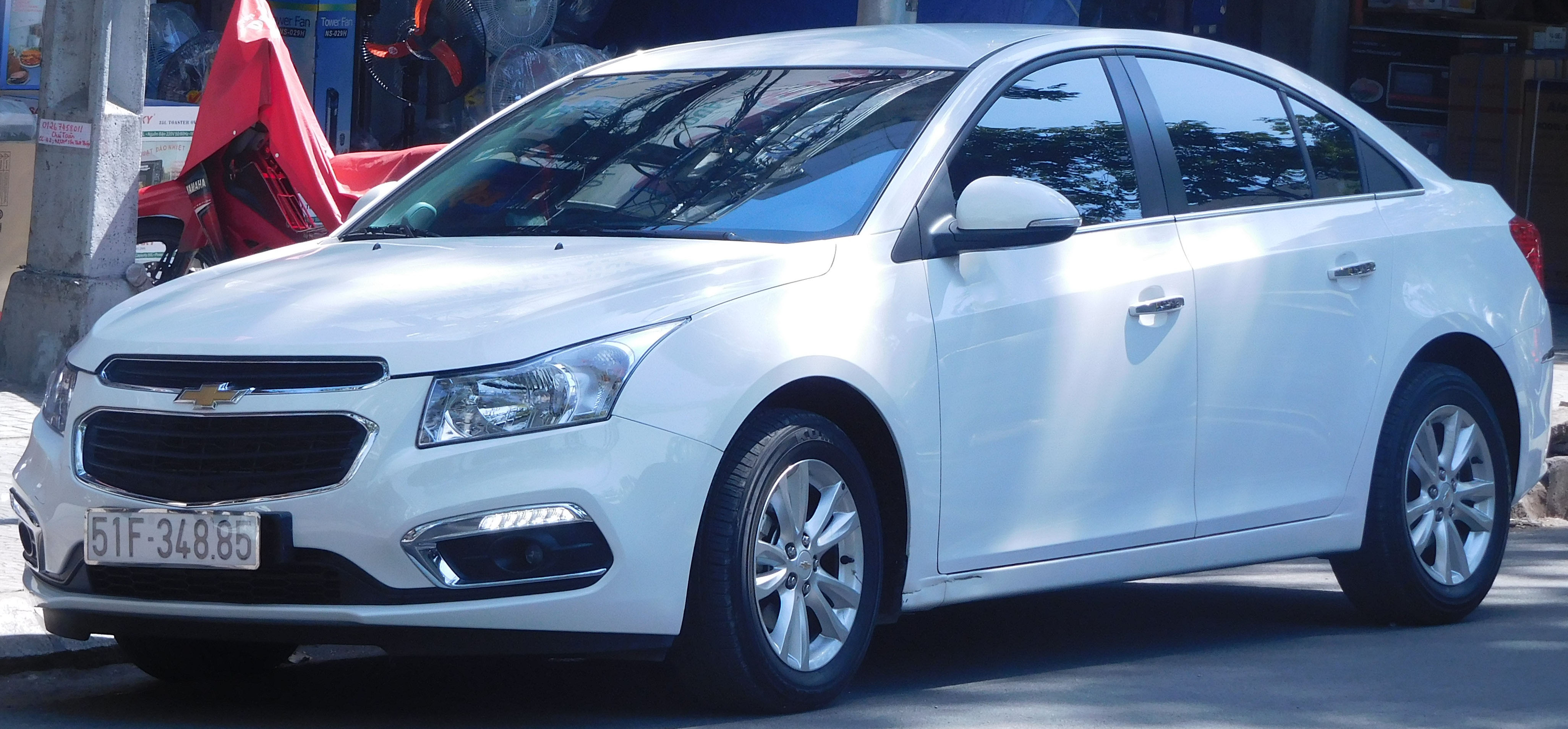
Chevrolet Cruze

=== Chevrolet ===
  - Chevrolet Spark Lite (2nd gen model) (2010–2017)
  - Chevrolet Spark (2004–2017)
  - Chevrolet Aveo/Sonic (2004–2017)
  - Chevrolet Cruze (2009–2017)
  - Chevrolet Optra (2005–2011)
  - Chevrolet Lumina (2000–2013)
  - Chevrolet Vivant (2005–2010)
  - Chevrolet Orlando (2011–2017)
  - Chevrolet Captiva (2006–2017)
  - Chevrolet Trailblazer (2012–2017)
  - Chevrolet Blazer (1999–2005)

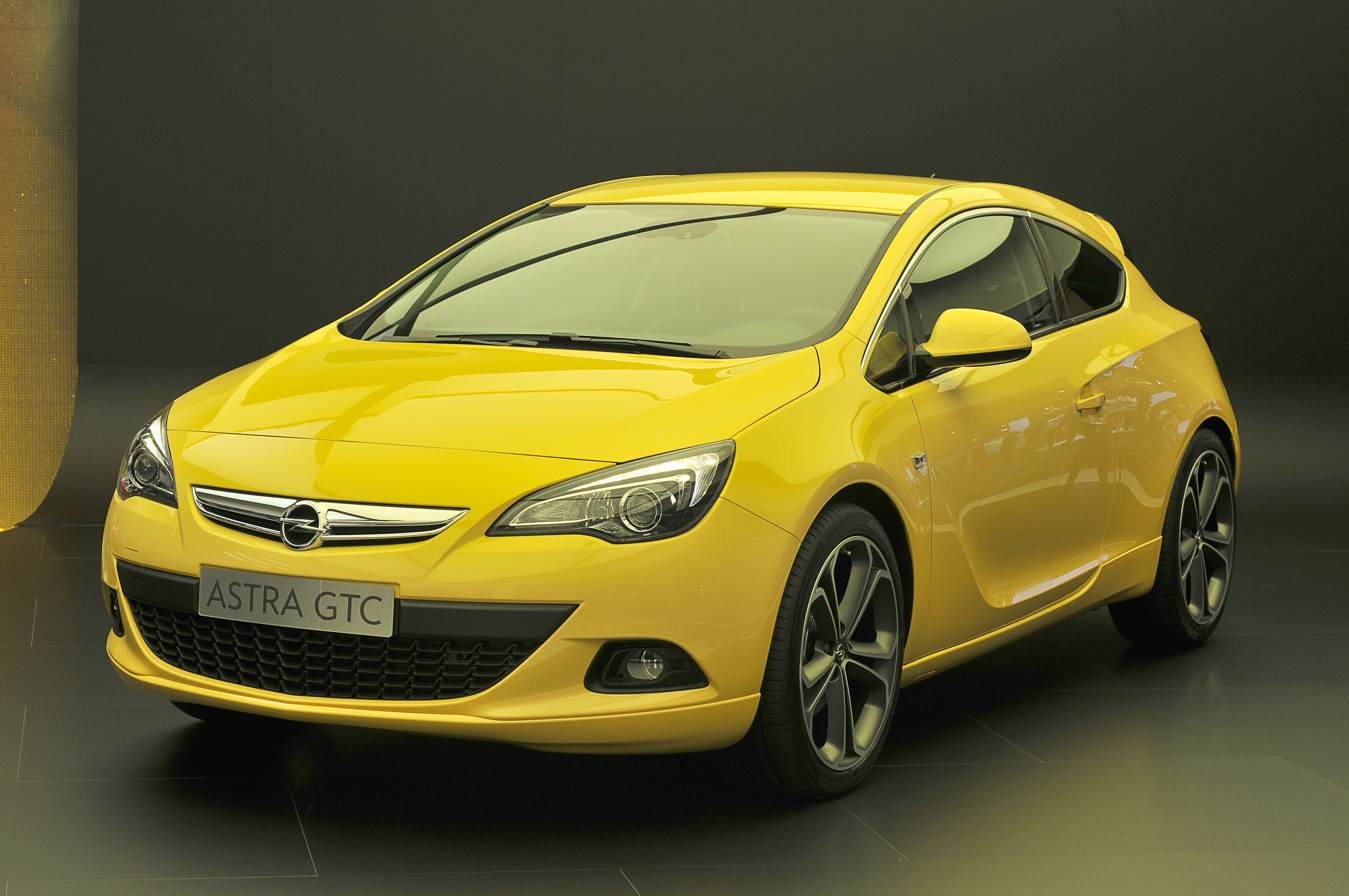
Opel Astra GTC

=== Opel ===
  - Opel Adam (2012–2017)
  - Opel Corsa (5-door) (1982–2017)
  - Opel Tigra (2004–2009)
  - Opel Astra (5-door, GTC, OPC) (1991–2017)
  - Opel Mokka (2012–2017)
  - Opel Meriva (2003–2017)
  - Opel Zafira (1999–2006)

=== Hummer ===
- Hummer H3 (2007–2010)

== Commercial vehicles ==
=== Chevrolet ===
  - Chevrolet Utility (2011–2017)
  - Chevrolet Lumina Ute (2004–2013)

=== Opel ===
  - Opel Corsa Utility (2004–2010)
  - Opel Combo (2007–2011)
  - Opel Vivaro (2006–2017)

=== Isuzu ===
  - Isuzu D-Max (2002–2017)

== Locomotives ==
In 1974, General Motors South Africa Ltd. began constructing GM-designed locomotives rather than importing them from the United States. In January 1987, GMSA was sold to local management which continued production as the Delta Motor Corporation. The company failed after one order of 11E-Type locomotives were constructed using GMSA leftovers. Delta Motor Corporation focused instead on automobile engines rather than locomotives, shutting down the plant where the locomotives were constructed.

The locomotive customers for GMSA (1974–1987) were:

- South African Railways
- Iscor
- African Explosives & Chemical Industries
- Anglo-American Coal
- Middleburg Steel & Alloys
- KwaZulu Finance & Development Corporation
- Port of Richards Bay – coal terminal
- Bophuthatswana National Development Corporation

=== Locomotive models ===
- South African Class 34-600
- South African Class 34-800
- South African Class 35-200
- South African Class 35-600
- South African Class 36-200
- South African Class 11E
