= South African Class 35-600 =

Class of 101 South African diesel-electric locomotives

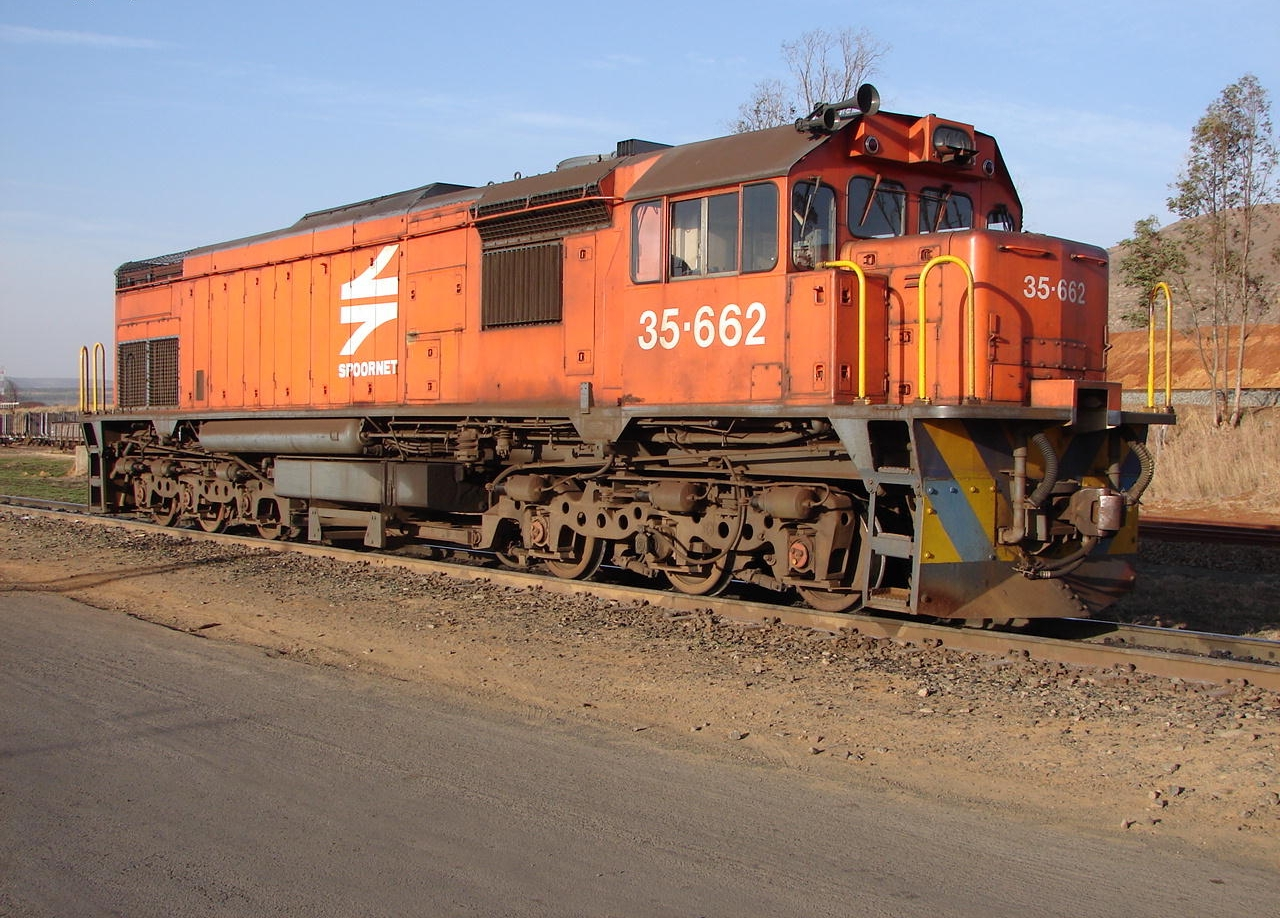
- No. 35-662 at Vryheid Yard, 15 August 2007
Type and origin
- Power type: Diesel-electric
- Designer: General Motors Electro-Motive Division
- Builder: General Motors South Africa
- Serial number: 103-1 to 103-50, 110-1 to 110-50, 111-1
- Model: GM-EMD GT18MC
- Build date: 1976–1978
- Total produced: 101
Specifications
- Configuration
  - AAR: C-C
  - UIC: Co'Co'
  - Commonwealth: Co+Co
- Gauge: 3 ft 6 in (1,067 mm) Cape gauge
- Wheel diameter: 915 mm (36 in)
- Wheelbase: 12,675 mm (41 ft 7 in)
  - Axle spacing (Asymmetrical): 1-2: 1,562 mm (5 ft 1 in); 2-3: 1,740 mm (5 ft 9 in)
  - Bogie: 3,302 mm (10 ft 10 in)
- Pivot centres: 9,627 mm (31 ft 7 in)
- Length
  - Over couplers: 16,485 mm (54 ft 1 in)
- Width: 2,819 mm (9 ft 3 in)
- Height: 3,924 mm (12 ft 10 in)
- Axle load: 13,720 kg (30,250 lb)
- Adhesive weight: 82,320 kg (181,480 lb)
- Loco weight: 82,320 kg (181,480 lb) max
- Fuel type: Diesel
- Fuel capacity: 3,400 litres (750 imp gal)
- Prime mover: GM-EMD 8-645E3
- RPM range: 250–900
  - RPM low idle: 250
  - RPM idle: 315
  - Maximum RPM: 900
- Engine type: 2-stroke diesel
- Aspiration: GM-EMD E-8 turbocharger
- Displacement: 10.57 litres (645.0 cu in) per cylinder
- Generator: 8 pole GM-EMD D25
- Traction motors: Six GM-EMD D29CCBT DC 4 pole
  - Rating 1 hour: 485A
  - Continuous: 450A @ 15 km/h (9.3 mph)
- Cylinders: V8
- Gear ratio: 57:16
- MU working: 4 maximum
- Loco brake: 28-LAV-1 with vigilance control
- Train brakes: Gardner-Denver ADJV-8400 compressor/exhauster
- Air tank cap.: 800 litres (180 imp gal)
- Compressor: 0.021 m^{3}/s (0.74 cu ft/s)
- Exhauster: 0.098 m^{3}/s (3.5 cu ft/s)
- Couplers: AAR knuckle (SASKOP DS)
Performance figures
- Maximum speed: 100 km/h (62 mph)
- Power output
  - Starting: 1,195 kW (1,603 hp)
  - Continuous: 1,065 kW (1,428 hp)
- Tractive effort
  - Starting: 201 kN (45,000 lbf) @ 25% adh.
  - Continuous: 161 kN (36,000 lbf) @ 19 km/h (12 mph)
- Factor of adh.
  - Starting: 25%
  - Continuous: 20%
- Brakeforce: 65% ratio @ 345 kPa (50.0 psi)
- Dynamic brake peak effort: 138 kN (31,000 lbf) @ 28 km/h (17 mph)
Career
- Operators: South African Railways; Columbus Stainless; Spoornet; Transnet Freight Rail; PRASA
- Class: Class 35-600
- Number in class: 101
- Numbers: 35-601 to 35-700, Columbus 4
- Delivered: 1976–1978
- First run: 1976

The South African Railways Class 35-600 of 1976 is a branch line diesel-electric locomotive.

Between September 1976 and June 1978, the South African Railways placed one hundred Class 35-600 General Motors Electro-Motive Division type GT18MC diesel-electric locomotives in branch line service. In 1977, one more Class 35-600 locomotive was built for Columbus Stainless in Middelburg, Transvaal.

== Manufacturer ==
The Class 35-600 type GT18MC diesel-electric locomotive was designed by General Motors Electro-Motive Division (GM-EMD) and built in two batches for the South African Railways (SAR) by General Motors South Africa (GMSA) in Port Elizabeth. Fifty were delivered between September 1976 and May 1977, numbered in the range from 35-601 to 35-650, and another fifty between May 1977 and June 1978, numbered in the range from 35-651 to 35-700.

In addition, another single Class 35-600 GT18MC locomotive was built new in 1977 for Columbus Stainless, a large stainless steel plant which was established in Middelburg, Transvaal in 1965.

== Distinguishing features ==
Of the GM-EMD Class 35 locomotives, the Class 35-200 and 35-600 are visually indistinguishable from each other.

== Service ==
The Class 35 family is South Africa's standard branch line diesel-electric locomotive. The GM-EMD Class 35-600s were designed for light rail conditions and they work on most branch lines in the central, eastern, northern and northeastern parts of the country. A number of them also saw service in Richards Bay working the Golela line.

== Works numbers ==
The Class 35-600 builder's works numbers are listed in the table.

Class 35-600, GM-EMD type GT18MC
Loco no.	Works no.
35-601	103-1
35-602	103-2
35-603	103-3
35-604	103-4
35-605	103-5
35-606	103-6
35-607	103-7
35-608	103-8
35-609	103-9
35-610	103-10
35-611	103-11
35-612	103-12
35-613	103-13
35-614	103-14
35-615	103-15
35-616	103-16
35-617	103-17
35-618	103-18
35-619	103-19
35-620	103-20
35-621	103-21
35-622	103-22
35-623	103-23
35-624	103-24
35-625	103-25
35-626	103-26
35-627	103-27
35-628	103-28
35-629	103-29
35-630	103-30
35-631	103-31
35-632	103-32
35-633	103-33
35-634	103-34
35-635	103-35
35-636	103-36
35-637	103-37
35-638	103-38
35-639	103-39
35-640	103-40
35-641	103-41
35-642	103-42
35-643	103-43
35-644	103-44
35-645	103-45
35-646	103-46
35-647	103-47
35-648	103-48
35-649	103-49
35-650	103-50
35-651	110-1
35-652	110-2
35-653	110-3
35-654	110-4
35-655	110-5
35-656	110-6
35-657	110-7
35-658	110-8
35-659	110-9
35-660	110-10
35-661	110-11
35-662	110-12
35-663	110-13
35-664	110-14
35-665	110-15
35-666	110-16
35-667	110-17
35-668	110-18
35-669	110-19
35-670	110-20
35-671	110-21
35-672	110-22
35-673	110-23
35-674	110-24
35-675	110-25
35-676	110-26
35-677	110-27
35-678	110-28
35-679	110-29
35-680	110-30
35-681	110-31
35-682	110-32
35-683	110-33
35-684	110-34
35-685	110-35
35-686	110-36
35-687	110-37
35-688	110-38
35-689	110-39
35-690	110-40
35-691	110-41
35-692	110-42
35-693	110-43
35-694	110-44
35-695	110-45
35-696	110-46
35-697	110-47
35-698	110-48
35-699	110-49
35-700	110-50
Columbus	111-1

== Liveries ==
The Class 35-600 were all delivered in the SAR Gulf Red livery with signal red buffer beams, yellow side stripes on the long hood sides and a yellow V on each end. In the 1990s many of them began to be repainted in the Spoornet orange livery with a yellow and blue chevron pattern on the buffer beams. Several later received the Spoornet maroon livery. In the late 1990s many were repainted in the Spoornet blue livery with outline numbers on the long hood sides. After 2008 in the Transnet Freight Rail (TFR) and Passenger Rail Agency of South Africa (PRASA) era, many were repainted in the TFR red, green and yellow livery and at least one was repainted in the PRASA blue livery.

== Illustration ==
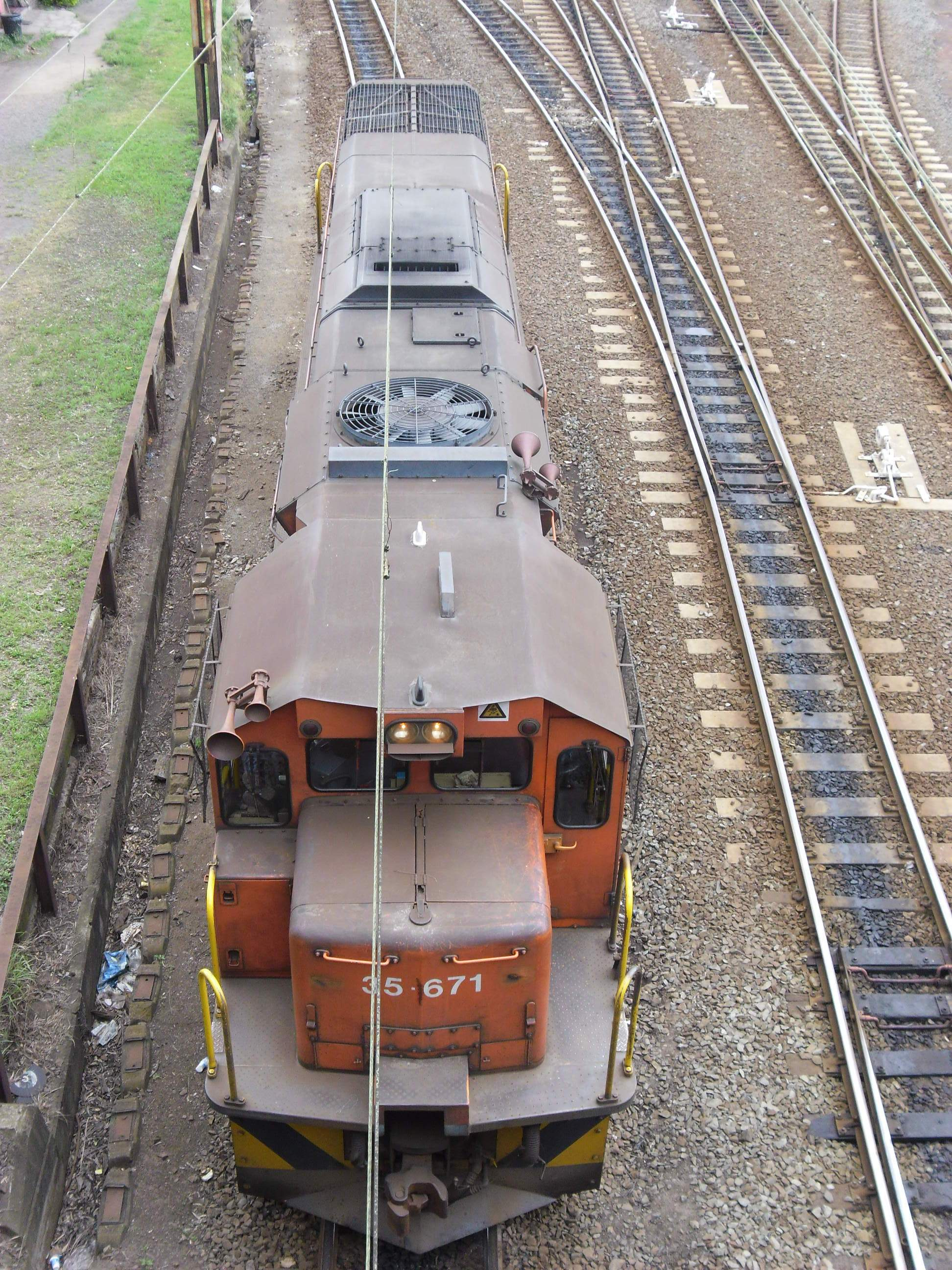
Overhead view of no. 35–671 at Mason's Mill, Pietermaritzburg, 8 November 2011
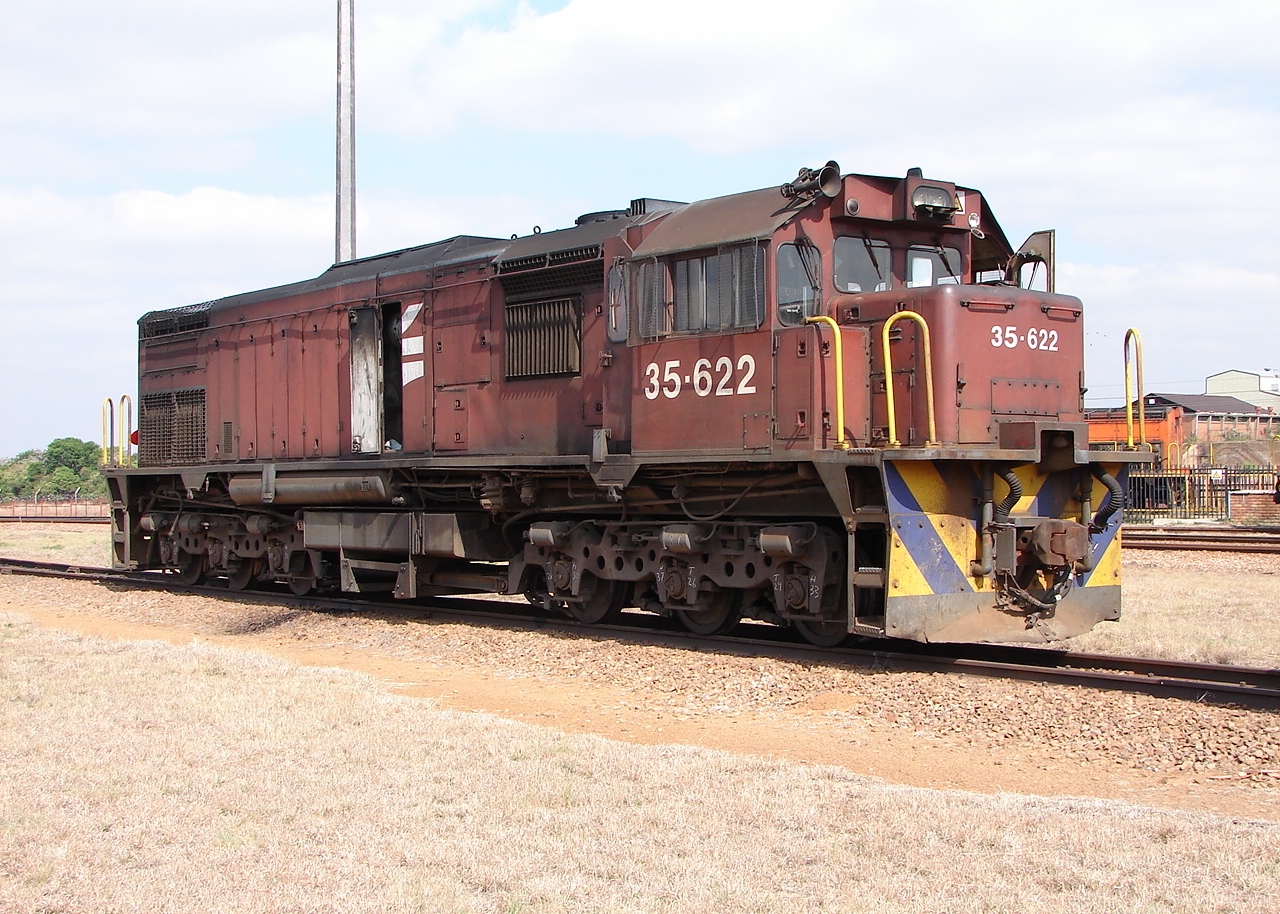
No. 35–622 in Spoornet maroon livery, Koedoespoort, Pretoria, 30 September 2009

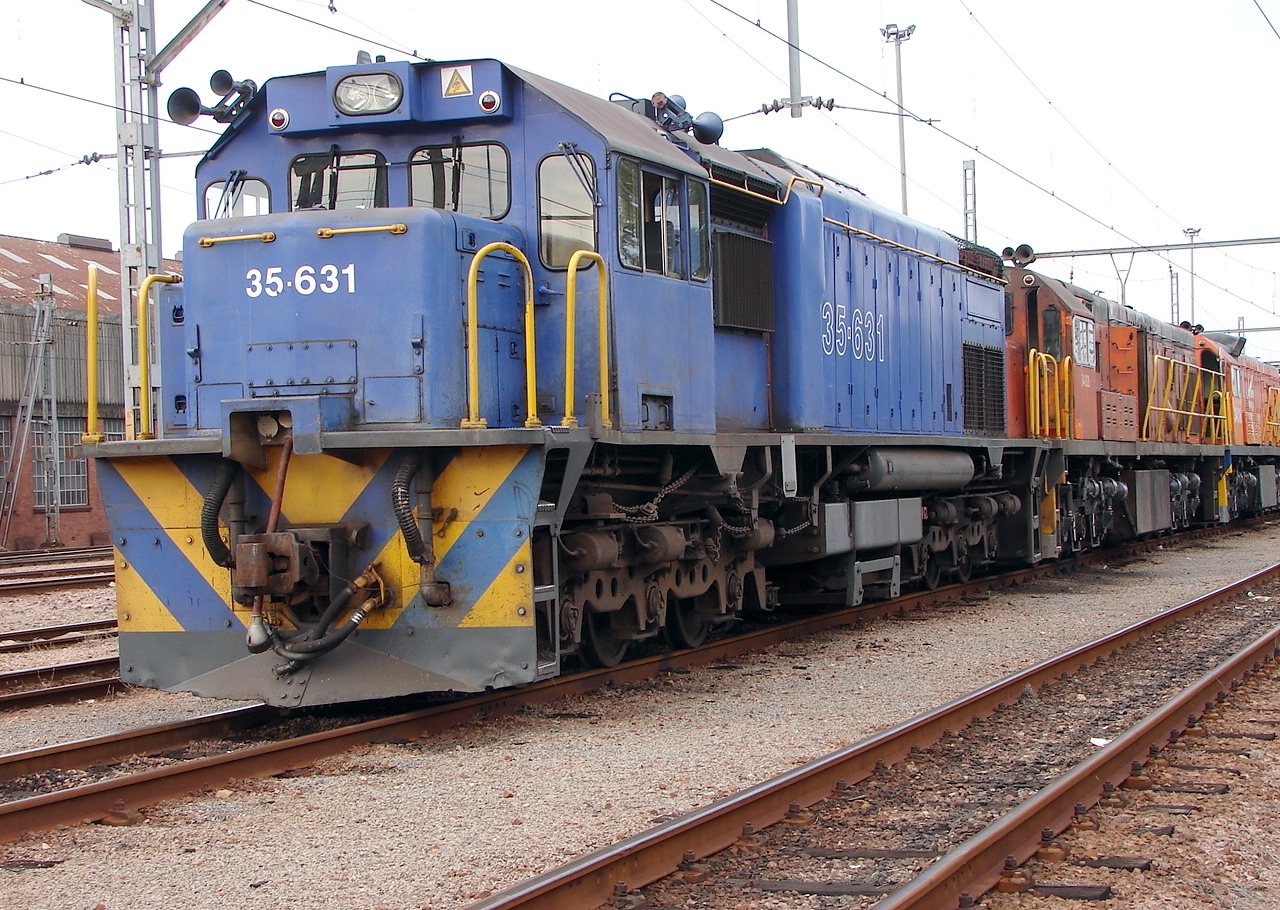
No. 35–631 in Spoornet blue with outline numbers, Capital Park, 1 October 2009

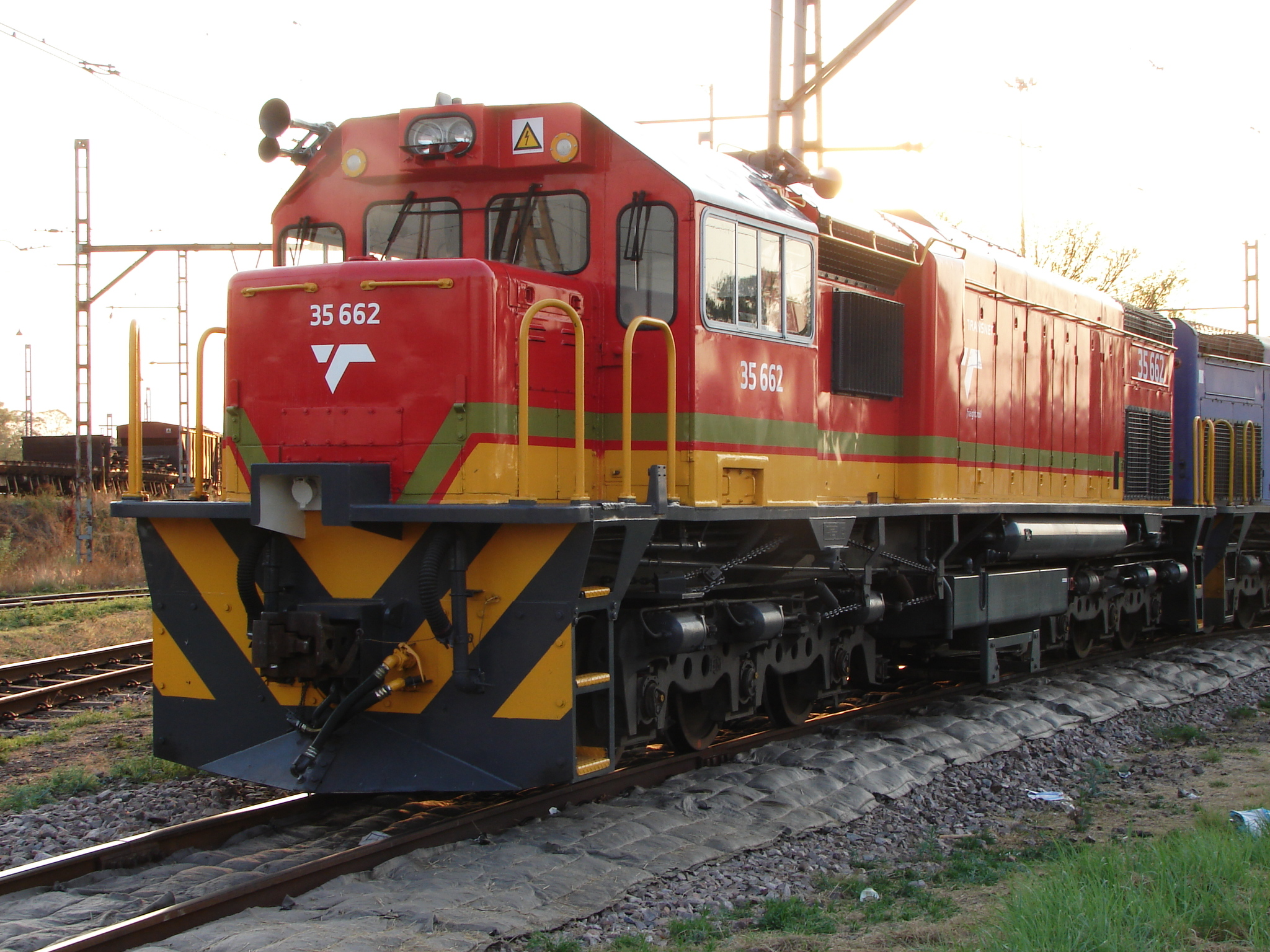
No. 35–662 in Transnet Freight Rail livery, Capital Park, 26 September 2015

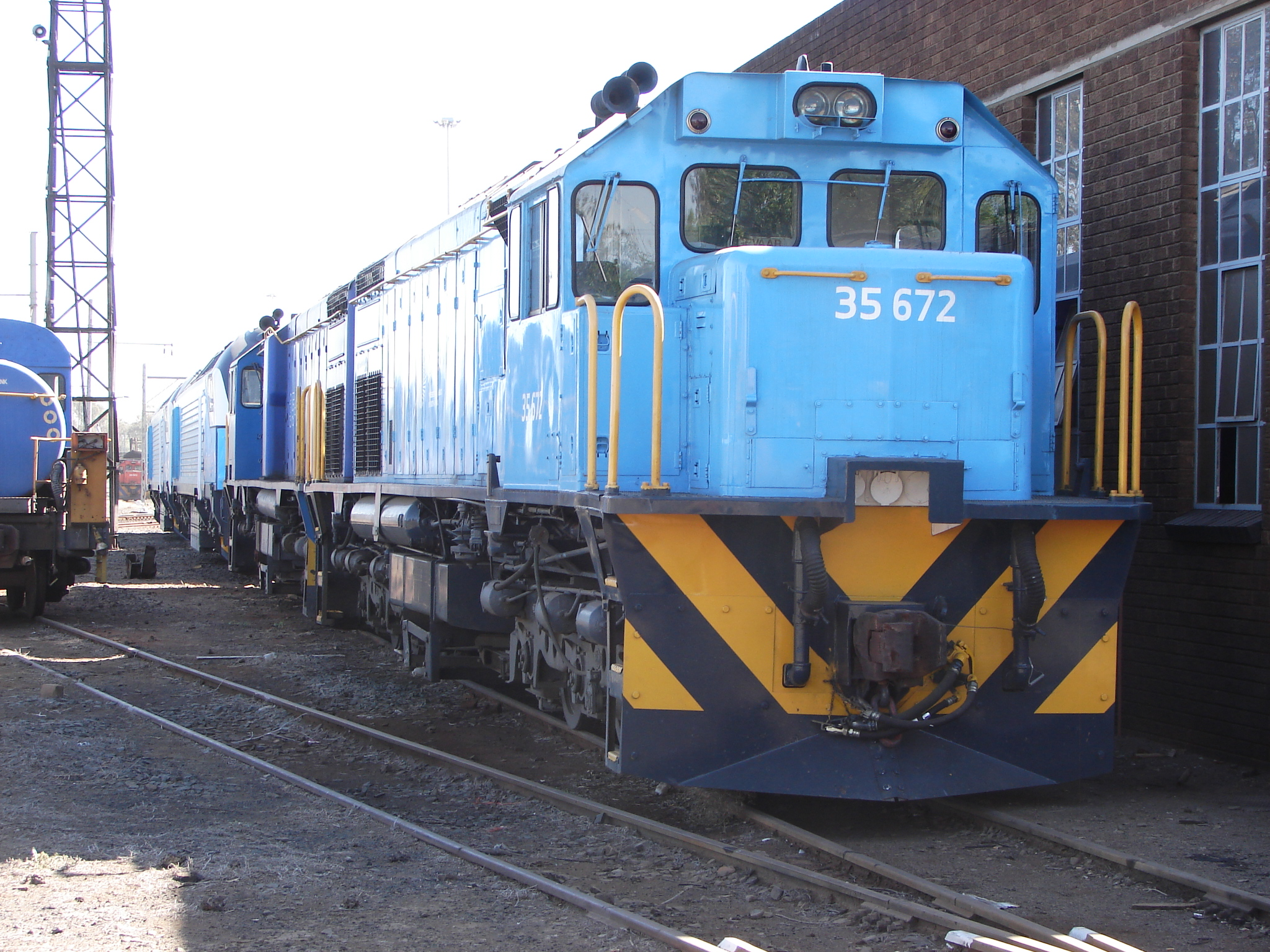
No. 35–672 in PRASA's backdrop blue livery, Bloemfontein, 18 September 2015
