= South African Class 11E =

Class of Co-Co electric locomotive

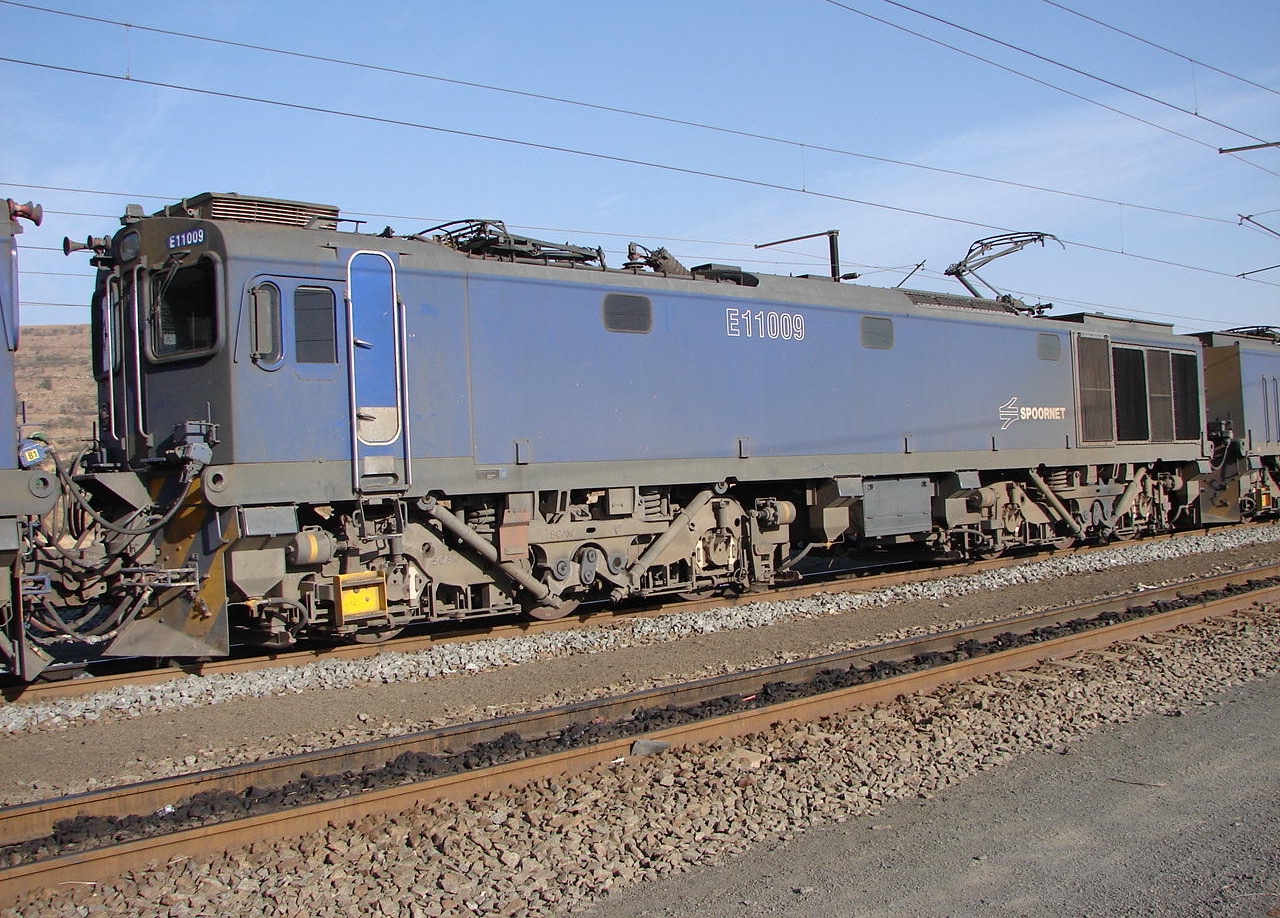
- No. 11-009 at Vryheid, KwaZulu-Natal, 15 August 2007
Type and origin
- Power type: Electric
- Designer: General Motors
- Builder: 11-001 – 11-030 GMSA; 11-031 – 11-045 Delta
- Serial number: GMSA 119.01-119.30; Delta 119.31-119.45
- Model: General Motors GM5FC
- Build date: 1985-1987
- Total produced: 45
Specifications
- Configuration
  - AAR: C-C
  - UIC: Co'Co'
  - Commonwealth: Co-Co
- Gauge: 3 ft 6 in (1,067 mm) Cape gauge
- Wheel diameter: 1,220 mm (48.03 in)
- Wheelbase: 14,360 mm (47 ft 1 3/8 in)
  - Bogie: 4,400 mm (14 ft 5 1/4 in)
- Pivot centres: 11,560 mm (37 ft 11 1/8 in)
- Panto shoes: 11,940 mm (39 ft 2 1/8 in)
- Length
  - Over couplers: 20,470 mm (67 ft 1 7/8 in)
  - Over body: 19,200 mm (62 ft 11 7/8 in)
- Width: 2,850 mm (9 ft 4 1/4 in)
- Height
  - Pantograph: 4,200 mm (13 ft 9 3/8 in)
  - Body height: 3,962 mm (13 ft 0 in)
- Axle load: 29,000 kg (64,000 lb)
- Loco weight: 172,280 kg (379,810 lb) (11-001 – 11-012); 168,000 kg (370,000 lb) (11-013 – 11-045)
- Electric system/s: 25 kV AC 50 Hz catenary
- Current pickup(s): Pantographs
- Traction motors: Six LJM-540-1
  - Rating 1 hour: 690 kW (930 hp)
  - Continuous: 650 kW (870 hp)
- Gear ratio: 16:71
- Loco brake: Air & Rheostatic
- Train brakes: Air
- Couplers: AAR knuckle Type F
Performance figures
- Maximum speed: 90 km/h (56 mph)
- Power output
  - 1 hour: 4,140 kW (5,550 hp)
  - Continuous: 3,900 kW (5,200 hp)
- Tractive effort
  - Starting: 580 kN (130,000 lbf)
  - 1 hour: 425 kN (96,000 lbf)
  - Continuous: 400 kN (90,000 lbf)
- Brakeforce: 4,500 kW (6,000 hp)
Career
- Operators: South African Railways; Spoornet; Transnet Freight Rail
- Class: Class 11E
- Number in class: 45
- Numbers: 11-001 – 11-045
- Delivered: 1985-1987
- First run: 1985

The South African Railways Class 11E of 1985 is an electric locomotive.

Between 1985 and 1987, the South African Railways placed forty-five Class 11E electric locomotives with a Co-Co wheel arrangement in mainline service on the Coalink line.

== Manufacturers ==
The 25 kV AC Class 11E electric locomotive was designed for the South African Railways (SAR) by General Motors (GM) while its thyristor traction technology was provided by Allmänna Svenska Elektriska Aktiebolaget (ASEA) of Sweden. It was built in South Africa by General Motors South Africa (GMSA), whose corporate name was changed to Delta Motor Corporation two-thirds through the locomotive building process. Altogether forty-five locomotives were delivered between 1985 and 1987, numbered in the range from 11-001 to 11-045.

== Characteristics ==
=== Appearance ===
Following the Class 9E in 1978 and the Class 7E1 in 1980, the Class 11E was the third single-cab mainline electric locomotive to be acquired by the SAR. Until the Class 9E was introduced all South African mainline electric locomotives were dual cab units, but since the Classes 9E, 7E1 and 11E locomotives were designed to be used in a service where multiple unit operation was the normal practice, a second cab was deemed unnecessary.

=== Brakes ===
At the time, they were the most powerful locomotives in SAR service with a continuous power output of 3,900 kilowatts (5,200 horsepower) compared to the 3,840 kilowatts (5,150 horsepower) of the Class 9E. Four units can haul two hundred loaded coal wagons in a train weighing more than 21,000 tonnes (21,000 long tons). Since they are used on a route where loaded trains face steeper descending than ascending grades, the locomotive was designed to produce 4,500 kilowatts (6,000 horsepower) of rheostatic braking power.

=== Bogies ===
The Class 11E was built with sophisticated traction linkages on the bogies, similar to the bogie design which was introduced on the Class 6E1 in 1969. Together with the locomotive's electronic wheel-slip detection system, these traction struts, mounted between the linkages on the bogies and the locomotive body and colloquially referred to as grasshopper legs, ensure the maximum transfer of power to the rails without causing wheel-slip by reducing the adhesion of the leading bogie and increasing that of the trailing bogie by as much as 15% upon starting.

== Works numbers and delivery dates ==
The table lists the Class 11E works numbers and the date on which each unit was delivered to the SAR.

Class 11E, Type GM GM5FC
Loco no.	Builder	Works no.	Delivery date
11-001	GMSA	119.01	29 Apr 1985
11-002	GMSA	119.02	5 Jun 1985
11-003	GMSA	119.03	28 Jun 1985
11-004	GMSA	119.04	12 Jul 1985
11-005	GMSA	119.05	1 Nov 1985
11-006	GMSA	119.06	25 Apr 1986
11-007	GMSA	119.07	1 Nov 1985
11-008	GMSA	119.08	5 Dec 1985
11-009	GMSA	119.09	17 Dec 1985
11-010	GMSA	119.10	14 Feb 1986
11-011	GMSA	119.11	1 Mar 1986
11-012	GMSA	119.12	1 Mar 1986
11-013	GMSA	119.13	22 Mar 1986
11-014	GMSA	119.14	22 Mar 1986
11-015	GMSA	119.15	5 Apr 1986
11-016	GMSA	119.16	24 May 1986
11-017	GMSA	119.17	24 May 1986
11-018	GMSA	119.18	21 Jun 1986
11-019	GMSA	119.19	21 Jun 1986
11-020	GMSA	119.20	31 May 1986
11-021	GMSA	119.21	6 Jul 1986
11-022	GMSA	119.22	22 Aug 1986
11-023	GMSA	119.23	16 Aug 1986
11-024	GMSA	119.24	16 Aug 1986
11-025	GMSA	119.25	25 Sep 1986
11-026	GMSA	119.26	24 Sep 1986
11-027	GMSA	119.27	13 Oct 1986
11-028	GMSA	119.28	20 Dec 1986
11-029	GMSA	119.29	13 Dec 1986
11-030	GMSA	119.30	29 Mar 1987
11-031	Delta	119.31	1 May 1987
11-032	Delta	119.32	24 May 1987
11-033	Delta	119.33	6 Jun 1987
11-034	Delta	119.34	21 Jun 1987
11-035	Delta	119.35	3 Jul 1987
11-036	Delta	119.36	17 Jul 1987
11-037	Delta	119.37	31 Jul 1987
11-038	Delta	119.38	10 Aug 1987
11-039	Delta	119.39	28 Aug 1987
11-040	Delta	119.40	12 Sep 1987
11-041	Delta	119.41	19 Sep 1987
11-042	Delta	119.42	3 Oct 1987
11-043	Delta	119.43	16 Oct 1987
11-044	Delta	119.44	7 Nov 1987
11-045	Delta	119.45	5 Dec 1987

== Service ==
Until 1978, all electrified routes in South Africa used 3 kV DC. Beginning in 1978, 25 kV AC was introduced on all new mainline electrification projects bar one, the exception being the Orex iron ore line from Sishen to Saldanha where 50 kV AC was used. There are four isolated 25 kV AC routes.

- From Pyramid South to Pietersburg and via Rustenburg to Thabazimbi.
- From Ermelo to the Richards Bay Coal Terminal at Richards Bay.
- From Port Elizabeth to De Aar and from there north to Kimberley and south to Beaufort West.
- From East London to Springfontein in the Free State.

The Class 11E was designed primarily for export coal hauling on the 25 kV AC Coalink line between the Mpumalanga coalfields around Ermelo and the Richards Bay Coal Terminal via Vryheid in KwaZulu-Natal.

== Liveries ==
All the Class 11E locomotives were delivered in the SAR red oxide livery with signal red buffer beams and cowcatchers, with yellow whiskers on the ends folded over to below the side windows and with the number plates on the sides mounted on three-stripe yellow wings. In the late 1990s all were repainted in the Spoornet blue livery with either solid or outline numbers on the long hood sides.

== Illustration ==
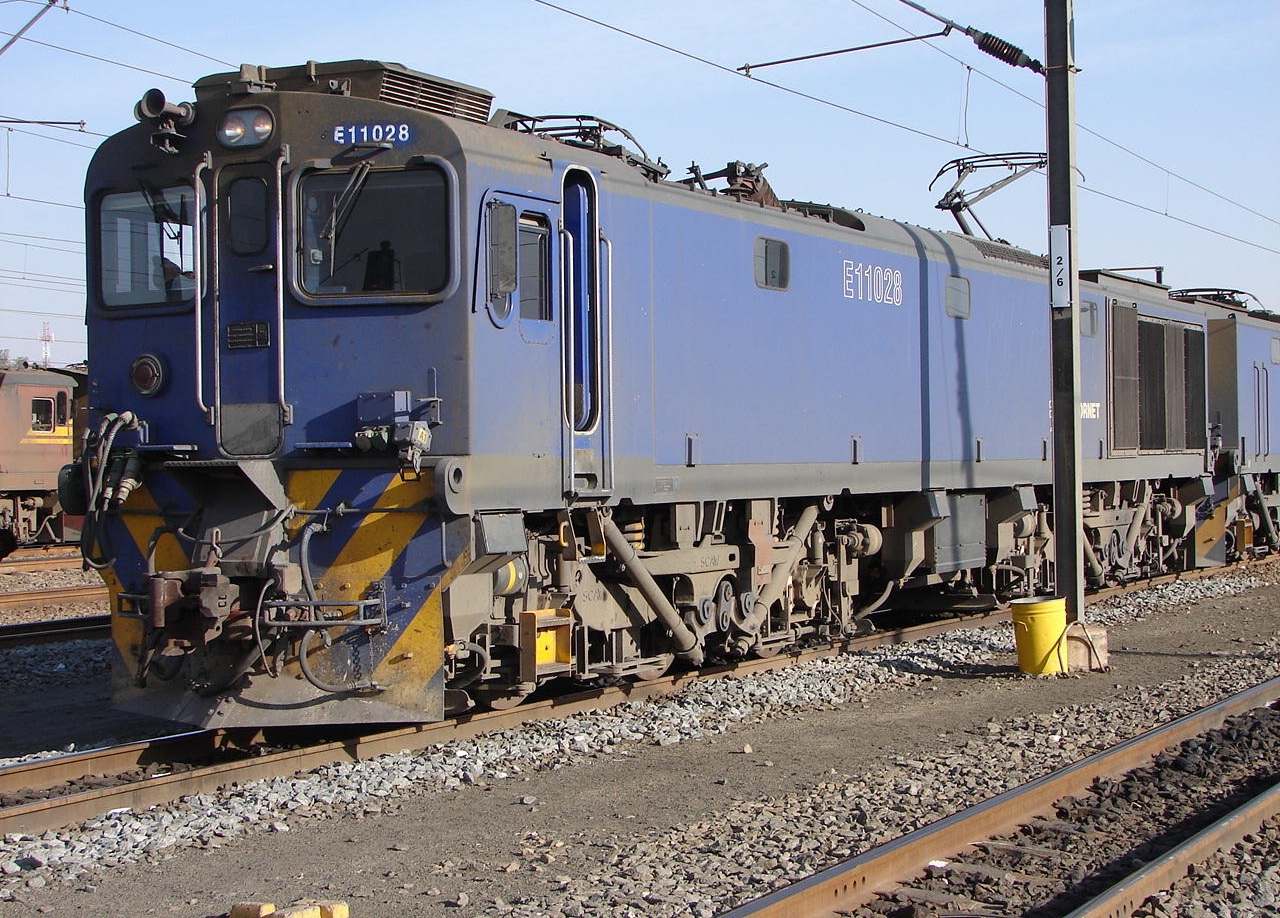
Front and left side view of no. 11-028, Vryheid, 16 August 2007

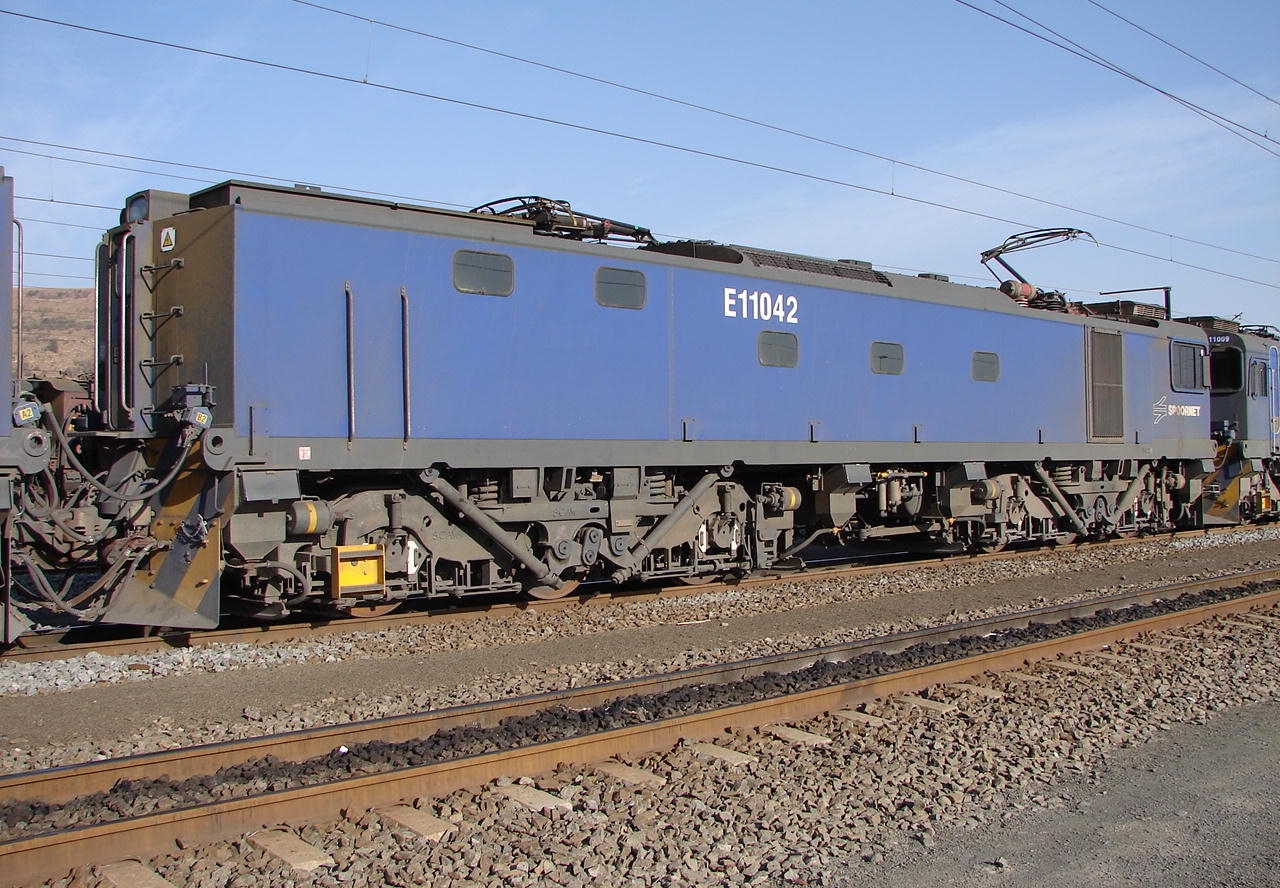
Right side view of no. 11-042, Vryheid, 15 August 2007

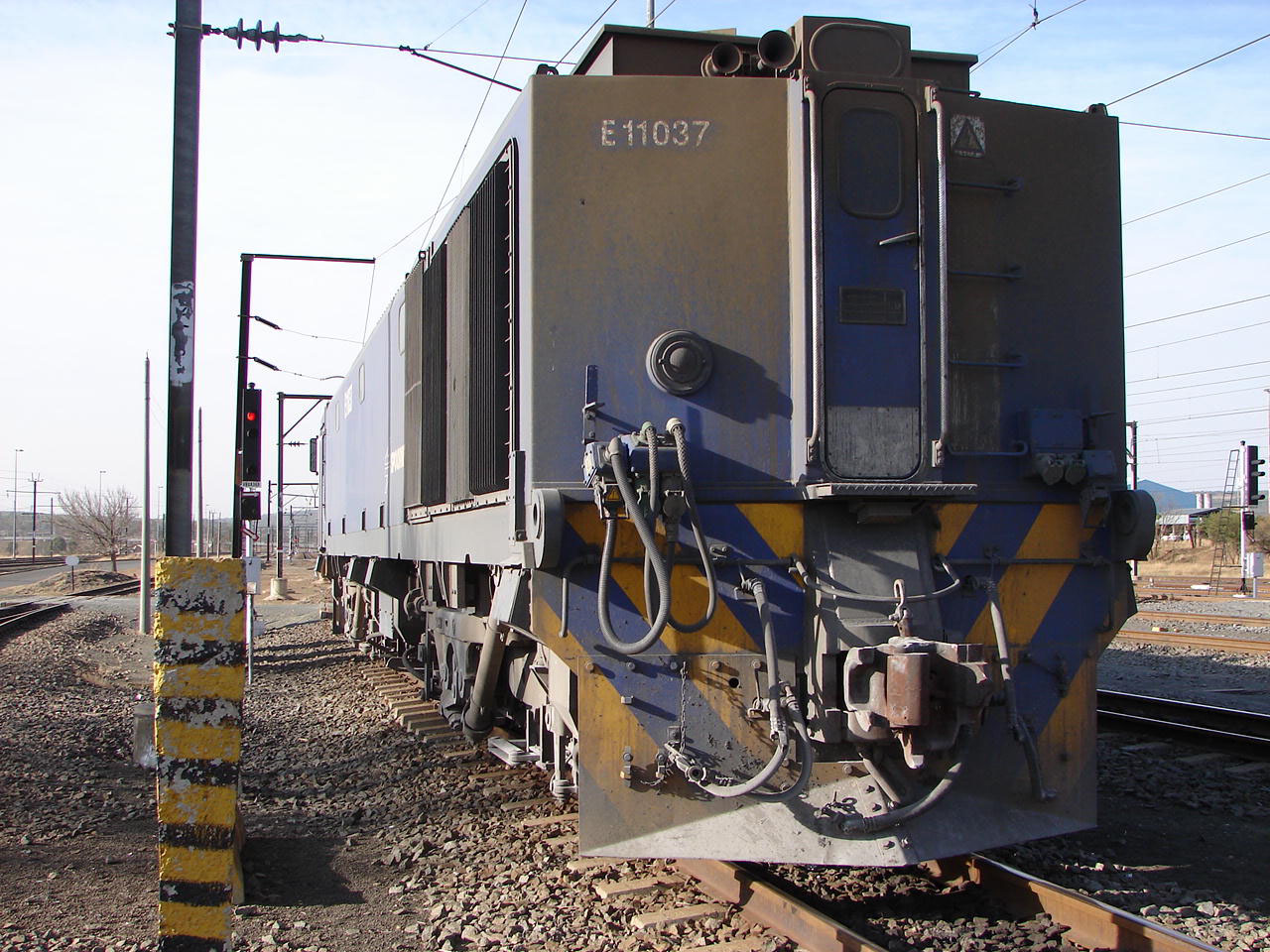
Rear view of no. 11-027, Vryheid, 15 August 2007
