= Andries Venter =

South African rugby union and rugby league footballer

Personal information
- Full name: Andries Venter
- Born: 4 October 1986 (age 38); South Africa
- Height: 180 cm (6 ft)
- Weight: 117 kg (18 st 6 lb)

Playing information

Rugby union
Club
| Years | Team | Pld | T | G | FG | P |
|---|---|---|---|---|---|---|
| | Kempton Park Wolves |
| | Furness RUFC |
| | Kendal |
| | Total | 0 | 0 | 0 | 0 | 0 |

Rugby league
- Position: Prop
Club
| Years | Team | Pld | T | G | FG | P |
|---|---|---|---|---|---|---|
| | Barrow Raiders |

Andries Venter is a South African rugby league and rugby union footballer who has played in the 2010s. He has played club level rugby union (RU) in South Africa for Kempton Park Wolves (in Kempton Park, Gauteng), as a prop, and in England for Furness RUFC and Kendal, and club level rugby League (RL) for the Barrow Raiders in Championship 1, as a prop. He has also represented South Africa in rugby league.
