= South African Class 10E =

1985 South African electric locomotive

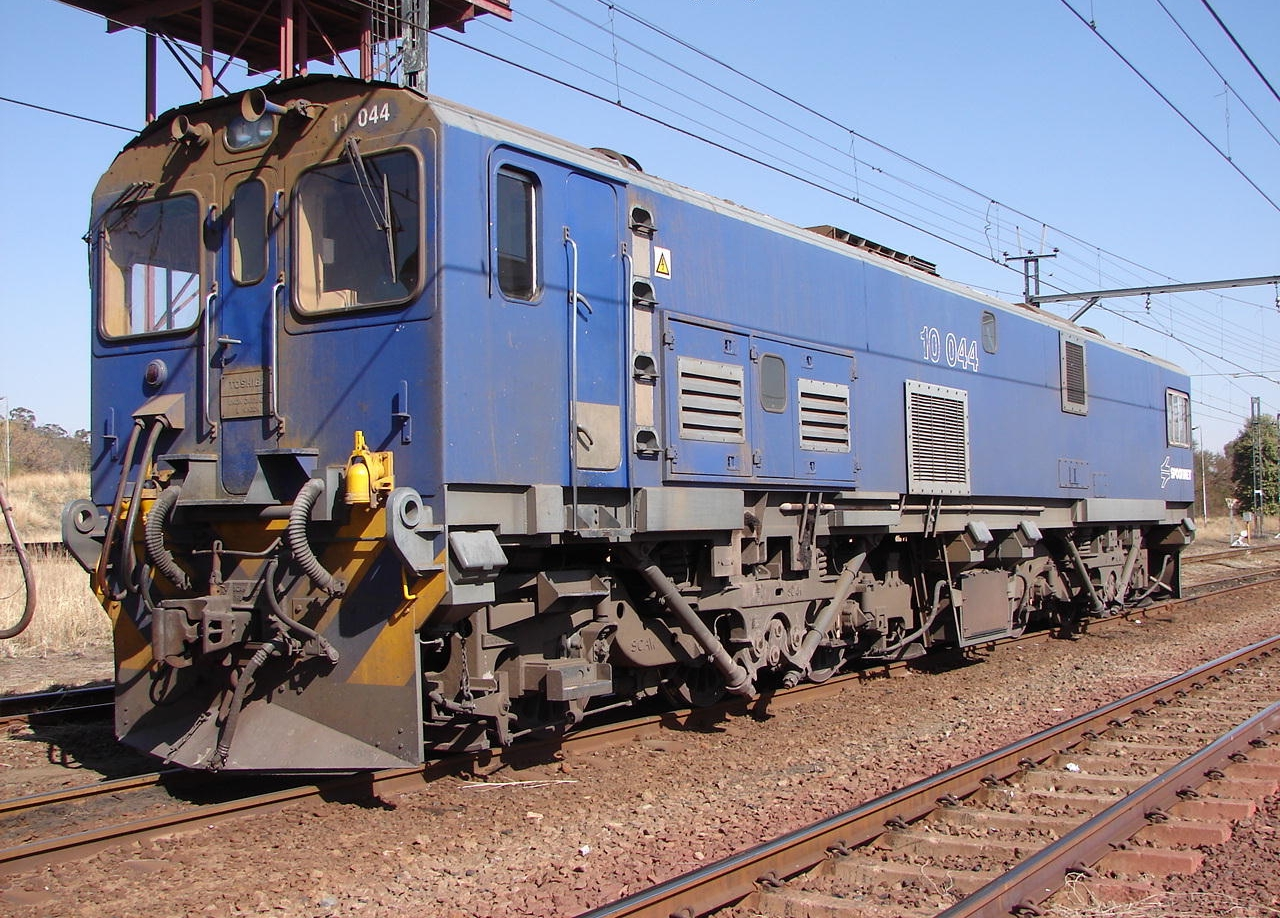
- No. 10-044 at Klerksdorp, North West, 23 August 2007
Type and origin
- Power type: Electric
- Designer: Toshiba
- Builder: Union Carriage & Wagon
- Model: Toshiba 10E
- Build date: 1985-1986
- Total produced: 50
Specifications
- Configuration
  - AAR: C-C
  - UIC: Co'Co'
  - Commonwealth: Co-Co
- Gauge: 3 ft 6 in (1,067 mm) Cape gauge
- Wheel diameter: 1,220 mm (48.03 in)
- Wheelbase: 13,460 mm (44 ft 1 7/8 in)
  - Bogie: 4,060 mm (13 ft 3 7/8 in)
- Pivot centres: 10,200 mm (33 ft 5 5/8 in)
- Panto shoes: 12,000 mm (39 ft 4 1/2 in)
- Length
  - Over couplers: 18,520 mm (60 ft 9 1/8 in)
  - Over body: 17,506 mm (57 ft 5 1/4 in)
- Height
  - Pantograph: 4,120 mm (13 ft 6 1/4 in)
  - Body height: 3,945 mm (12 ft 11 3/8 in)
- Axle load: 21,210 kg (46,760 lb)
- Adhesive weight: 125,000 kg (276,000 lb)
- Loco weight: 125,000 kg (276,000 lb)
- Electric system/s: 3 kV DC catenary
- Current pickup(s): Pantographs
- Traction motors: Six SE-218
  - Rating 1 hour: 540 kW (720 hp)
  - Continuous: 515 kW (691 hp)
- Gear ratio: 19:92
- Loco brake: Air, Regenerative & Rheostatic
- Train brakes: Air & Vacuum
- Couplers: AAR knuckle
Performance figures
- Maximum speed: 90 km/h (56 mph)
- Power output
  - 1 hour: 3,240 kW (4,340 hp)
  - Continuous: 3,090 kW (4,140 hp)
- Tractive effort
  - Starting: 450 kN (100,000 lbf)
  - 1 hour: 335 kN (75,000 lbf)
  - Continuous: 310 kN (70,000 lbf) @ 35 km/h (22 mph)
Career
- Operators: South African Railways; Spoornet; Transnet Freight Rail
- Class: Class 10E
- Number in class: 50
- Numbers: 10-001 to 10-050
- Nicknames: Breadbin
- Delivered: 1985-1986
- First run: 1985

The South African Railways Class 10E of 1985 is an electric locomotive.

In 1985 and 1986, the South African Railways placed fifty Class 10E electric locomotives with a Co-Co wheel arrangement in mainline service.

== Manufacturers ==
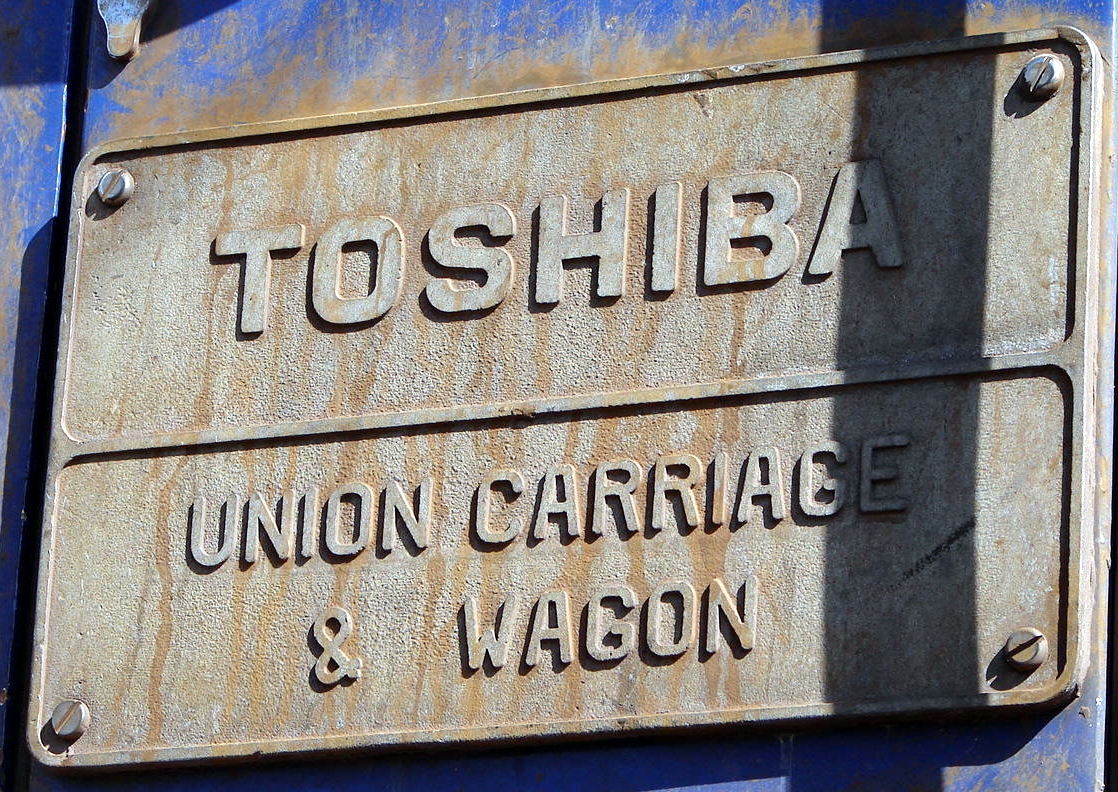
Builder’s plate

The 3 kV DC Class 10E electric locomotive was designed for the South African Railways (SAR) by Toshiba of Japan and was built by Union Carriage and Wagon (UCW) in Nigel, Transvaal. Toshiba supplied the electrical equipment while UCW was responsible for the mechanical components and assembly.

Fifty locomotives were delivered by UCW in 1985 and 1986, numbered in the range from 10–001 to 10-050. UCW did not allocate builder’s numbers to the locomotives it built for the SAR, but used the SAR unit numbers for their record keeping.

== Characteristics ==
The Class 10E was introduced as a new standard 3 kV DC heavy goods locomotive. With a continuous power rating of 3,090 kilowatts (4,140 horsepower), four Class 10E locomotives are capable of performing the same work as six Class 6E1s.

The entire fleet of the Class 10E family of electric locomotives use electronic chopper control which is smoother in comparison to the rheostatic resistance control which was used in the Classes 1E to 6E1 electric locomotives.

=== Brakes ===
The locomotive makes use of either regenerative or rheostatic braking, as the situation demands. Both traction and electric braking power are continuously variable, with the electric braking optimised to such an extent that maximum use will be made of the regenerative braking capacity of the 3 kV DC network, with the ability to automatically change over to rheostatic braking whenever the overhead supply system becomes non-receptive.

=== Bogies ===
The Class 10E was built with sophisticated traction linkages on the bogies, similar to the bogie design which was introduced on the Class 6E1 in 1969. Together with the locomotive's electronic wheel-slip detection system, these traction struts, mounted between the linkages on the bogies and the locomotive body and colloquially referred to as grasshopper legs, ensure the maximum transfer of power to the rails without causing wheel-slip by reducing the adhesion of the leading bogie and increasing that of the trailing bogie by as much as 15% upon starting off.

=== Orientation ===
These dual cab locomotives have a roof access ladder on one side only, just to the right of the cab access door. The roof access ladder end is marked as the no. 2 end.

=== Identifying Features ===
In visual appearance the Class 10E can be distinguished from the later model Class 10E2 by the roof ends and the sills. The Class 10E has riffled roof ends and parts of the sill protrude slightly past the bottom edge of the body sides. The Class 10E2 has smooth unriffled roof ends and no part of the sill protrudes past the bottom edge of the body sides.

== Service ==
The Class 10E is employed mainly to haul ore trains on the line between Kimberley and Hotazel in the Northern Cape and it also works between Kimberley and the Witwatersrand. Most are shedded at Beaconsfield near Kimberley, with several also at Welgedacht near Springs.

== Liveries ==
All the Class 10E locomotives were delivered in the SAR red oxide livery with signal red buffer beams and cowcatchers and a yellow V stripe on the ends, folded over to a horizontal stripe below the side windows. The number plates on the sides were mounted without the traditional three-stripe yellow wings. In the 1990s some of them were repainted in the Spoornet orange livery with a yellow and blue chevron pattern on the buffer beams and cowcatchers. Several later received the Spoornet maroon livery. In the late 1990s many were repainted in the Spoornet blue livery with outline numbers on the long hood sides.

== Illustration ==
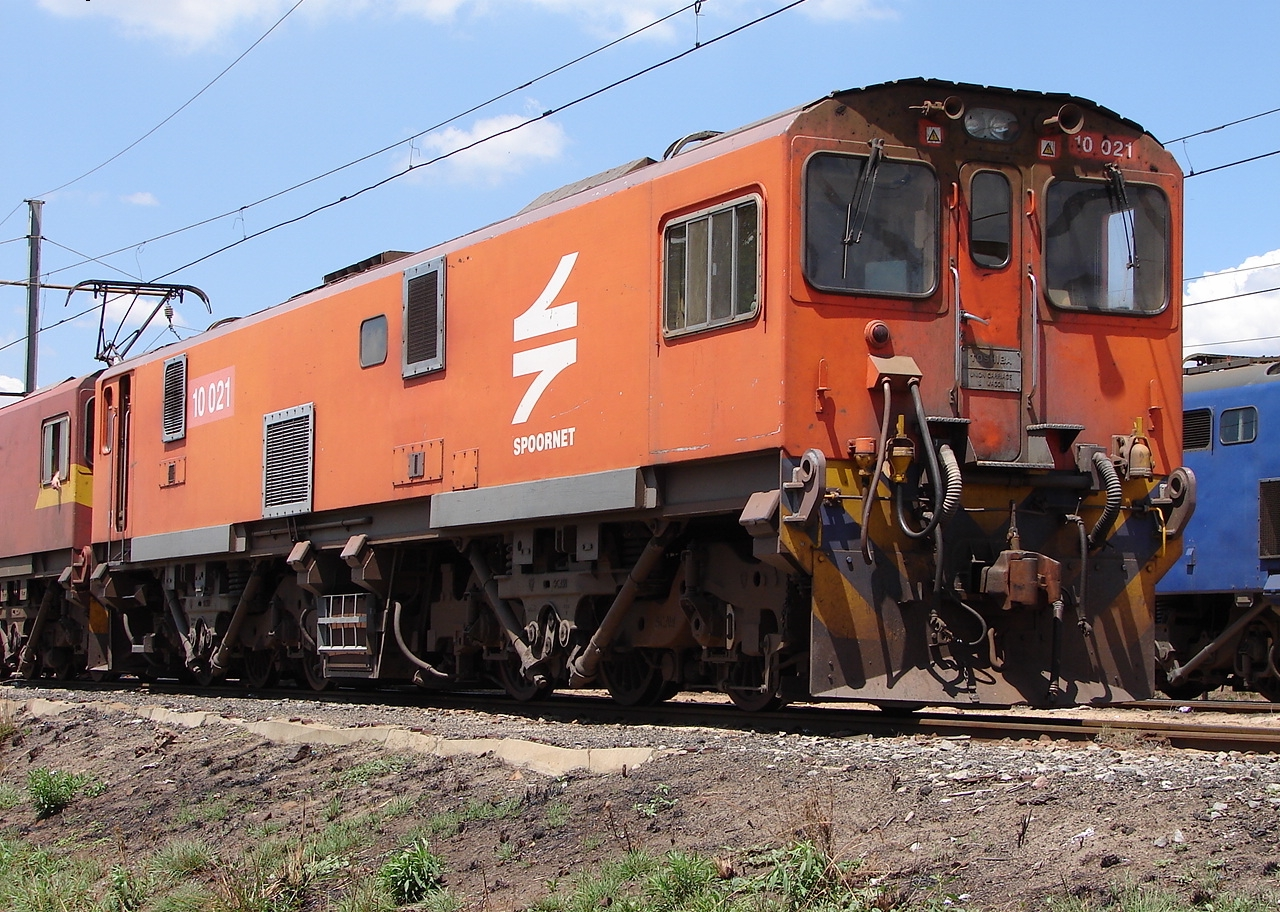
No. 10–021 in Spoornet orange livery at Pyramid South, Pretoria, 6 October 2009

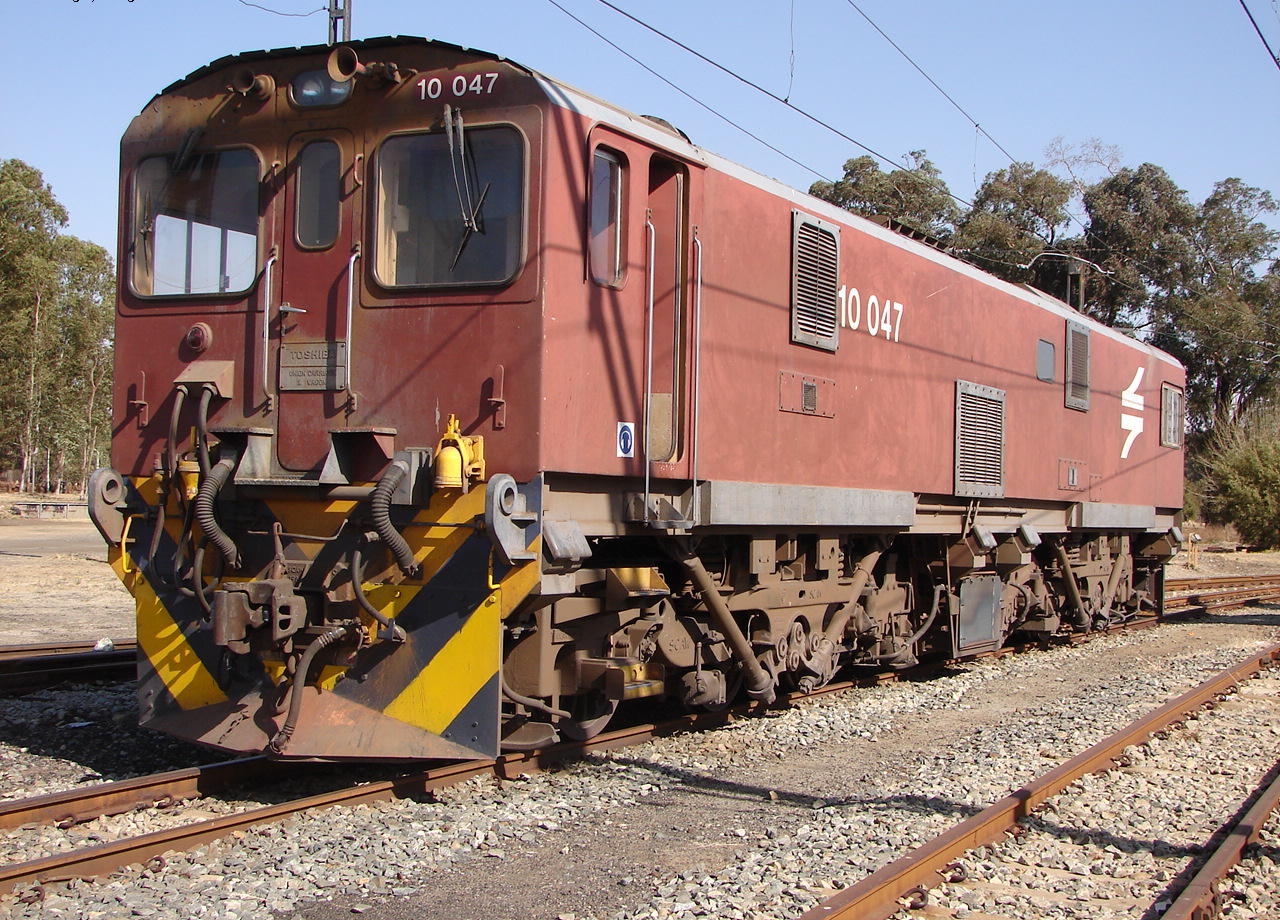
No. 10–047 in Spoornet maroon livery at Klerksdorp, North West, 23 August 2007

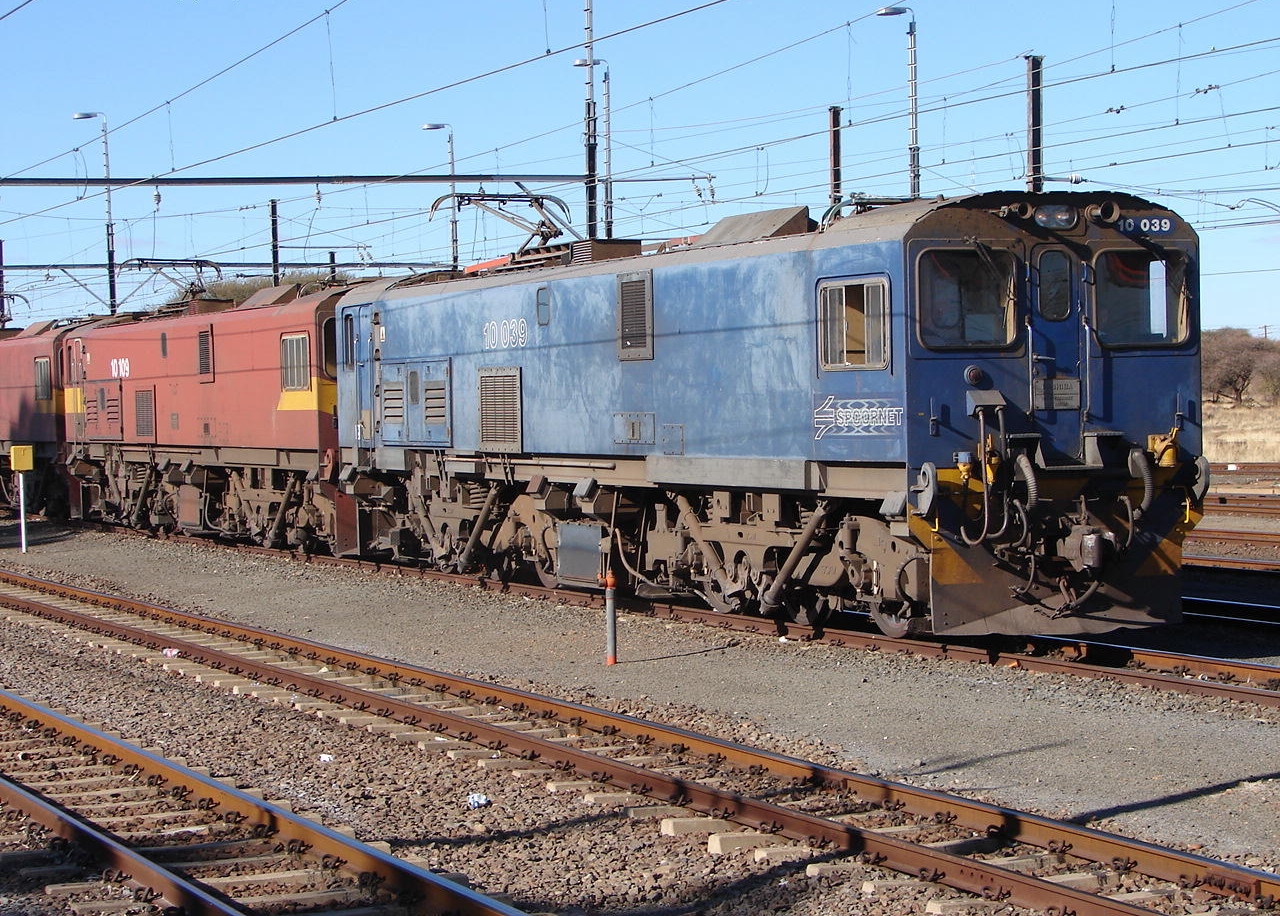
No. 10–039 in Spoornet blue with outline numbers at Warrenton, 24 August 2007

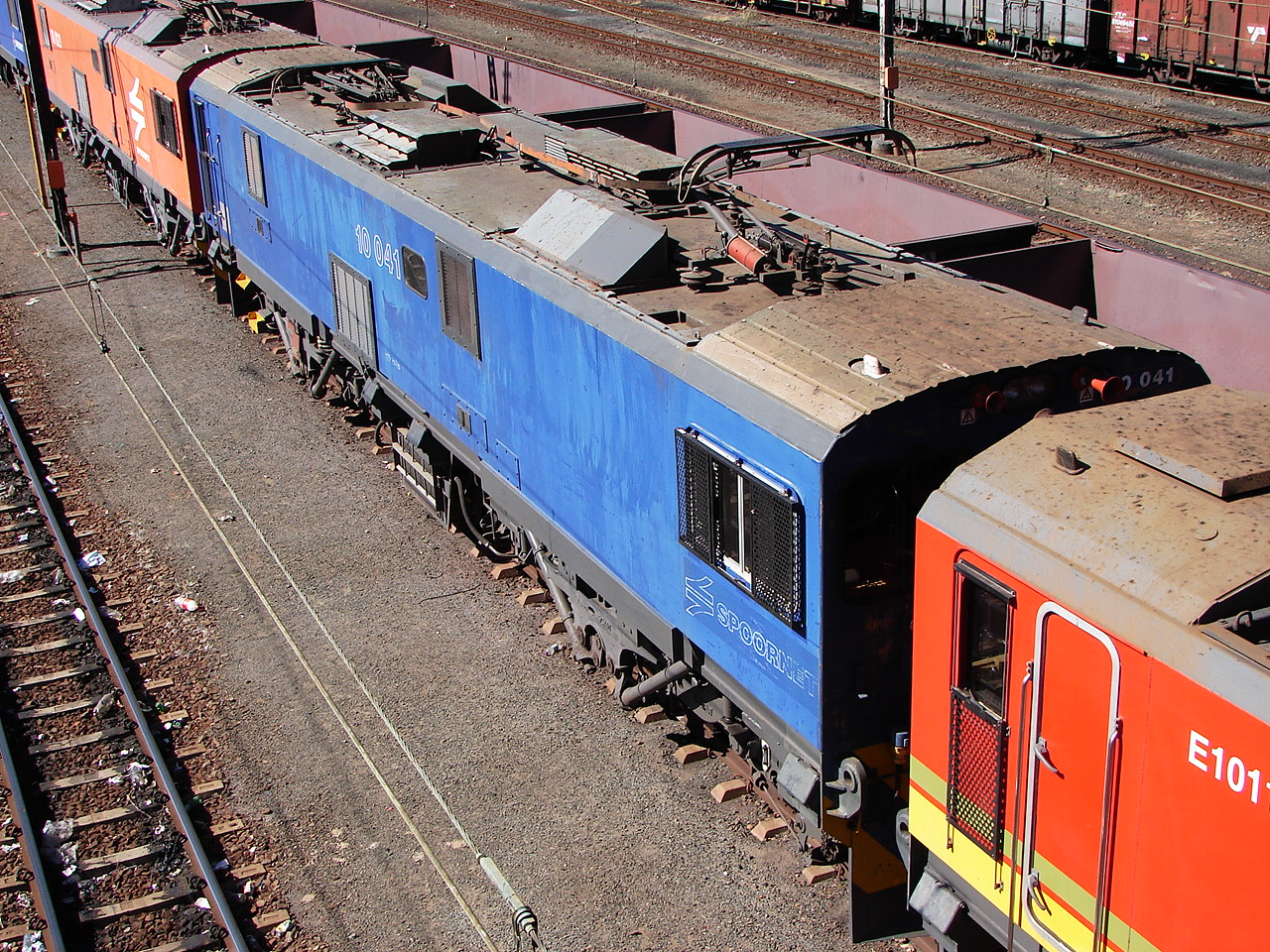
No. 10–041 in Spoornet blue with outline numbers, Warrenton, 2 May 2013
