= 2019 Johannesburg riots =

Riot in South Africa

Johannesburg riots
- Date: 1–5 September 2019; 8 September 2019
- Location: Johannesburg, South Africa; 26°12′15″S 28°4′22″E
- Caused by: Xenophobia; Death of a mini-bus taxi driver
- Methods: Looting; Civil disobedience
- Result: At least 12 dead, 680 arrested
- Location of Jeppestown, where the riots started.

The 2019 Johannesburg riots occurred in the South African city of Johannesburg from 1–5 September 2019, leading to the deaths of at least seven people. The riots were xenophobic in nature, targeting foreign nationals from other African countries. Retaliatory actions by rioters in other African nations was taken against South African brands. The South African Institute of Race Relations stated that the riots were similar in nature and origin to the 2008 xenophobic riots that also occurred in Johannesburg.

The riot resumed in Johannesburg on the 8 September 2019, when rioters marched on the central business district and looted shops whilst calling for foreigners to go.

== Riots ==
On 1 September 2019, riots and looting targeting shops owned by foreign nationals broke out in Jeppestown and Johannesburg CBD following the death of a taxi driver allegedly for trying to stop drug dealers. By 3 September, around 189 people had reportedly been arrested by police for looting. 423 have been arrested by 5 September and President Cyril Ramaphosa stated that at least ten people were confirmed to have died, including two foreign nationals. The looting meanwhile spread to the township of Alexandra.

Around 50 businesses predominantly owned by Africans from the rest of the continent were reportedly destroyed or damaged during the incident. The mosque located in the Jozi Mall was attacked and copies of Quran were defiled, while every shop in the mall was looted. In Katlehong, residents placed barriers on the roads before looting the Sontonga Mall, stated the Guanteng Police.

Two people were shot dead for trying to loot shops, including one South African named Isaac Sebaku in Coronationville by a Somali shop owner who was arrested and another person in Crosby. Premier of Gauteng, David Makhura, confirmed that a South African was shot over an incident of looting. Police Minister Bheki Cele stated the shop owner was a Pakistani.

News24 has reported that the police have confirmed two South Africans were shot dead in Brixton and Sophiatown during the riots and a Zimbabwean security guard was shot in Hillbrow. Two victims of unknown nationality were killed in Hillbrow and Jeppestown. Cele confirmed five murders were reported – two in Coronationville, two in Hillbrow and one in Jeppestown. Two charred corpses were recovered from shops burnt by looters in Alexandra.

On 5 September, the provincial police arrested 74 persons in Katlehong as looting and rioting continued, taking the number of arrests to 497. They also stated that 11 persons had died during the riots, though only 7 deaths are known to have been caused directly due to it. Isaac Sithole, a Zimbabwean, was beaten up and burnt alive by South African rioters in Katlehong. His sister-in-law alleged that a baby had also died in an arson attack.

Following the resumption of rioting on the 8 September Mangosuthu Buthelezi gave a speech calling for calm and a cessation of violence. One person died and five were injured during a protest by South Africans against immigrants in Johannesburg whilst 16 people were arrested. Another person was shot in Malvern during the violence. This brought the number of deaths to 12. The police stated that 640 people had been arrested since the riots began. By the end of the riots a reported total of over 680 people had been arrested.

== Trucker strike ==
The riots coincided with a nation-wide truck driver strike protesting against the employment of non-South African truckers. It also coincided with the publication of a statement by Human Rights Watch that over 200 people (mostly foreign truck drivers) had been killed in South Africa since March 2018. During the riot a number of freight trucks were torched and foreign truck drivers assaulted in the province of KwaZulu-Natal.

== Response ==
In response the Football Association of Zambia (FAZ) cancelled an international soccer match against South Africa taking place in Zambia due to “prevailing security concerns in South Africa.” A Pick n Pay store (a South African-based supermarket chain) in Zambia was stormed following the riots in South Africa.

The Government of Botswana issued travel advisory and warning to its citizens in wake of the deadly riots targeting foreigners.

=== South Africa ===
The South African NGO Right2Know stated that xenophobia and the resulting riots were partly the result of "xenophobic populism" espoused by South African politicians such as Herman Mashaba. A number of South African celebrities such as Nadia Nakai, Manaka Ranaka, and Cassper Nyovest were also publicly critical of xenophobia and the resulting riots.

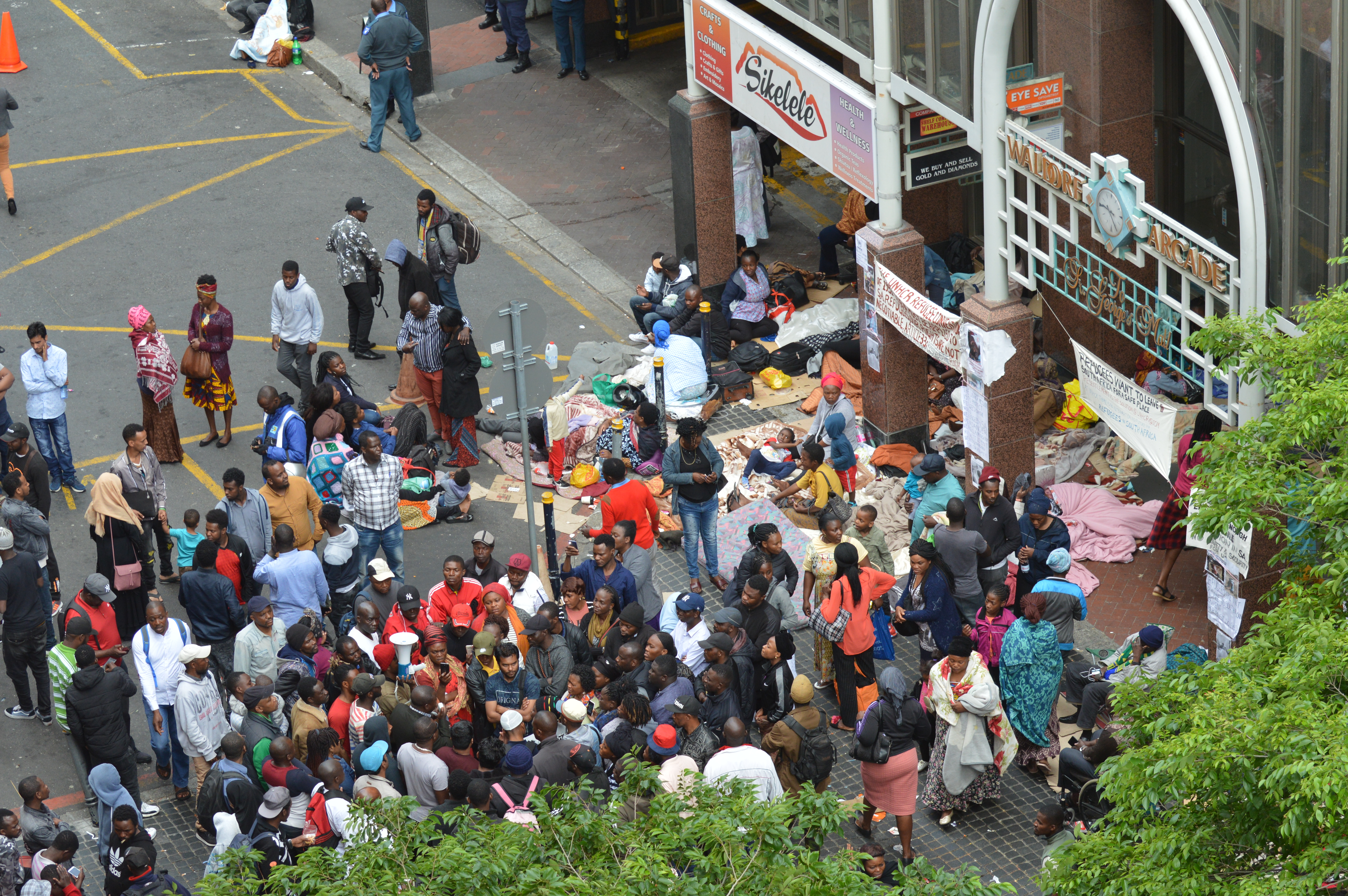
Foreign nationals on the sixth day of their sit-in outside the United Nations Refugee Agency offices in Cape Town. The banners they have put up call for the UN to pay for them to move to third countries so as to escape xenophobia in South Africa.

Almost a month after the riots in Johannesburg foreign nationals in Cape Town staged a sit-in outside the local offices of the United Nations Refugee Agency (UNRA). The nationals demanded that the UNRA pay for their fare back to their respective home countries so as to escape xenophobia in South Africa.

=== Nigeria ===
In Nigeria all stores and service centres operated by South African telecom company MTN were temporarily shut following retaliatory attacks on the company for the riots in South Africa. Other South African companies also temporarily suspended trading as Multichoice and Shoprite also stopped operations. Nigerian artist Tiwa Savage stated on Twitter that she would be cancelling appearances in South Africa in protest of the riots.

Following the riots President Muhammadu Buhari of Nigeria summoned the South African High Commissioner to convey his concerns about the incident to President Ramaphosa of South Africa. The Nigerian government also cancelled its participation at the African Economic Forum which was scheduled to be held in Cape Town in retaliation to the riots and closed its embassy in South Africa citing security concerns. Nigeria's ruling party, the All Progressives Congress, advocated for the nationalization of South African businesses in retaliation for attacks on Nigerian nationals. South African diplomatic missions in Abuja and Lagos were closed due to threats of retaliatory violence.

== See also ==
- 2015 South African xenophobic riots
- Xenophobia in South Africa
