= Central Methodist Mission =

Central Methodist Mission may refer to:

- The Albert Street Uniting Church in Brisbane, Queensland, Australia
- The Central Methodist Church, Cape Town, South Africa
- The Lyceum Theatre, Sydney, in Sydney, Australia
- Maughan Church was similar venue in Adelaide
