= Unrest =

Sociopolitical turbulence and discontent, may involve riots

Unrest, also called disaffection, is a sociological phenomenon, including:

- Civil disorder
- Domestic terrorism
- Industrial unrest
- Labor unrest
- Rebellion
- Riot
- Strike action
- State of emergency

== Notable historical instances of unrest ==
- 19th century Luddites
- 1978–79 Winter of Discontent (UK)
- 1989 Purple Rain Revolt (South Africa)
- 2003 Maldives civil unrest
- 2004 Unrest in Kosovo
- 2005 Belize unrest
- May 2005 unrest in Uzbekistan
- Arab Spring
- Post-coup unrest in Egypt (2013–14)
- 2014 pro-Russian conflict in Ukraine
- 2022 Kazakh unrest
- 2026 French civil unrest
