= Metropolitan Methodist Church =

Metropolitan Methodist Church may refer to:

- Central Methodist Church, Cape Town, South Africa.
- Metropolitan United Church in Toronto, Ontario, Canada.
- Metropolitan United Church in London, Ontario, Canada.
