= Rainbow Nation Peace Ritual =

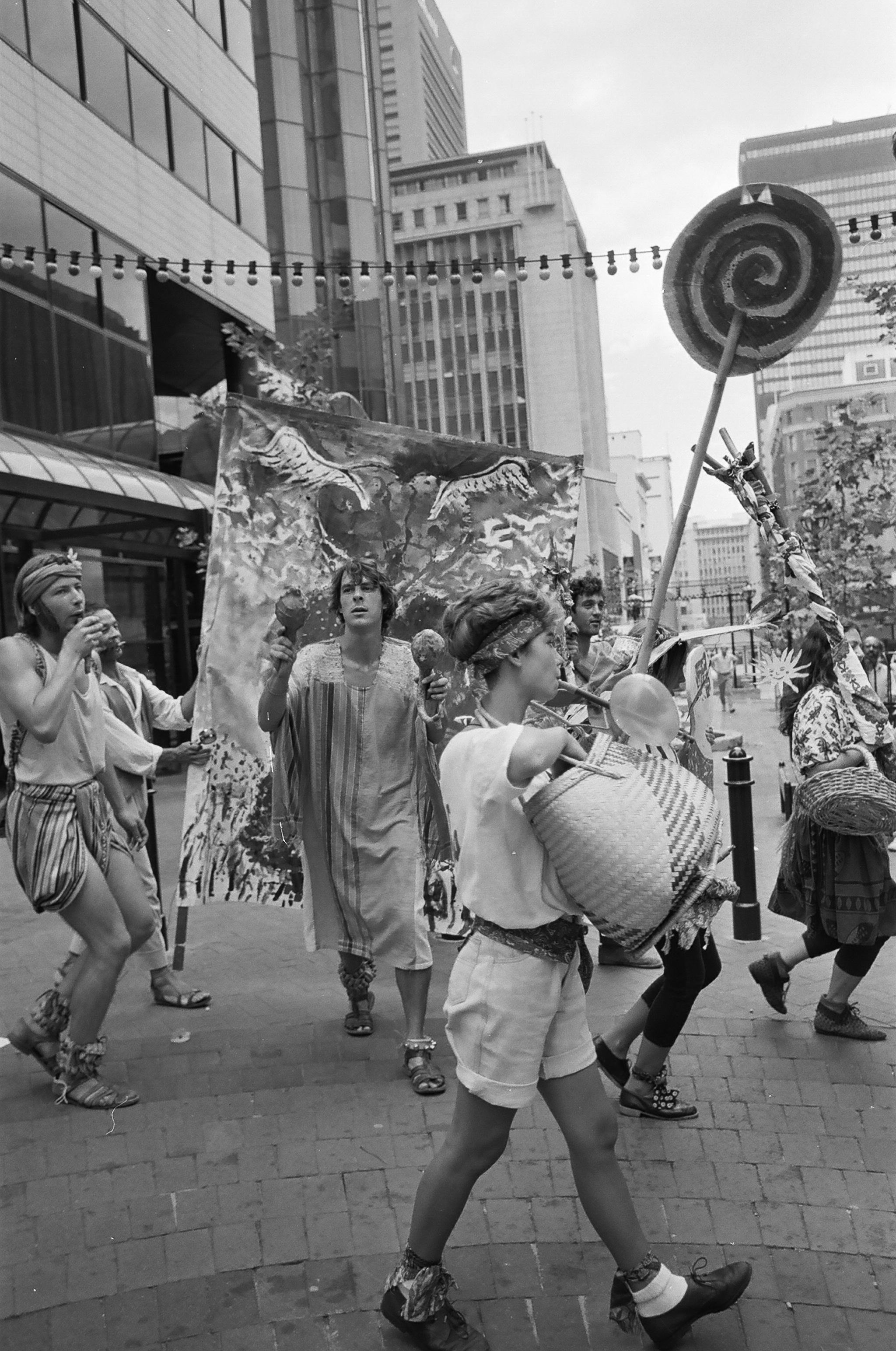
Participants in Rainbow Nation Peace Ritual, St George's Mall, Cape Town, February 3, 1990

The day after South African State President F. W. De Klerk announced that the African National Congress (ANC) and other political organisations would be unbanned and Nelson Mandela would be released from prison, a small group of Capetonians took to the streets in an act of guerrilla street theatre. The Rainbow Nation Peace Ritual as it eventually came to be known, had been planned ten days before the announcement by the Rainbow People's Party.

The production, which lasted a couple of hours, began at the Old Townhouse in Greenmarket Square, Cape Town. It then proceeded down Shortmarket Street and ended in St George's Mall.

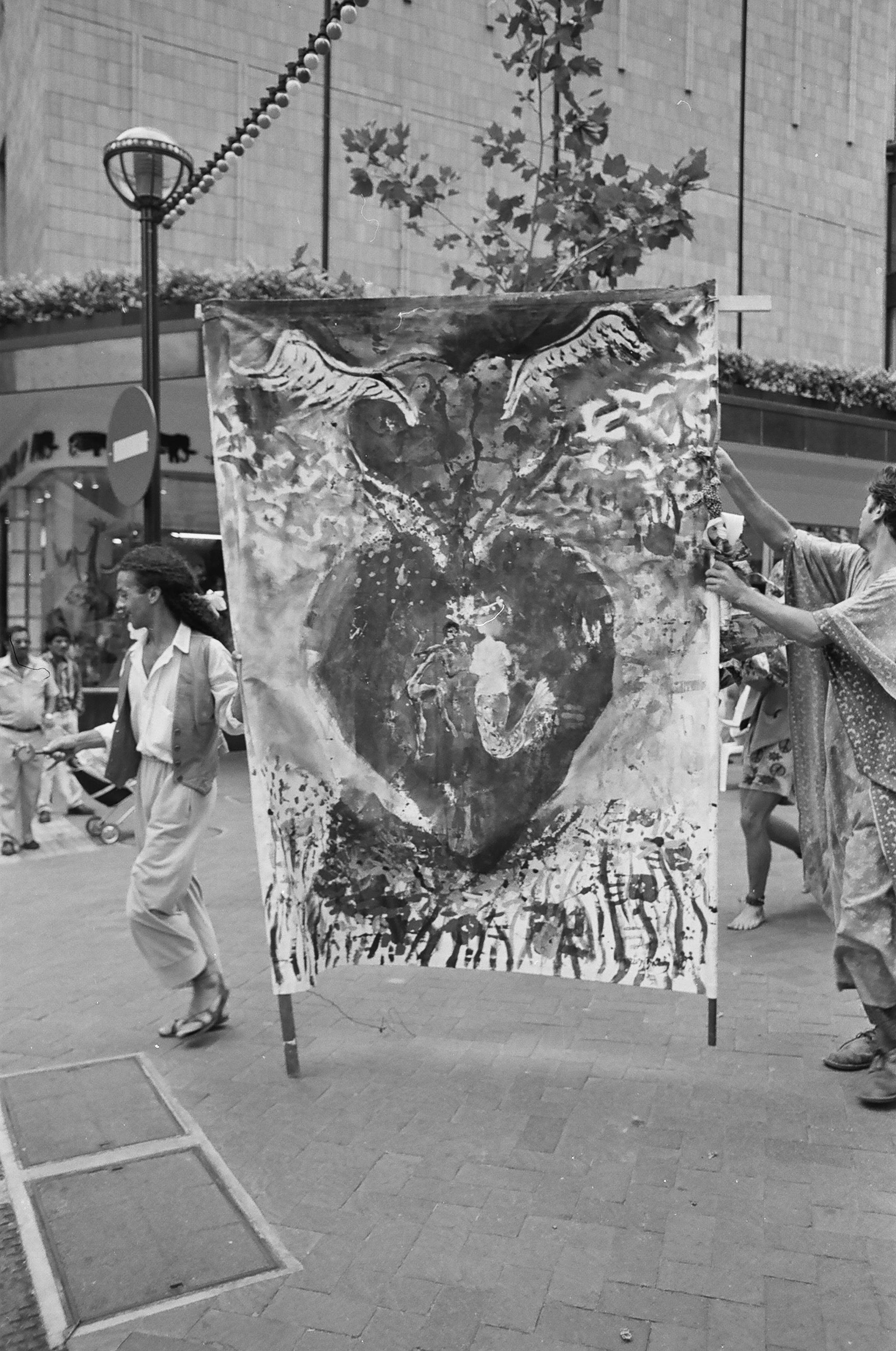
Beezy Bailey banner at the Rainbow Nation Peace Ritual, St George's Mall, Cape Town, February 3, 1990

The event featured a banner painted by Beezy Bailey. Participants included the anarchist Nat Tardrew, filmographer Nodi Murphy, ecologist and artist Karen Rolfes, performance artist Rehane Abrahams, publisher David Robert Lewis, and musician Philip Nangle. Documentary footage of the event was filmed by Craig Mathews of Doxa Productions.

== See also ==
- 1990 in South Africa
- Purple Rain Protest
- Rainbow Nation
