= Commercial Union Building =

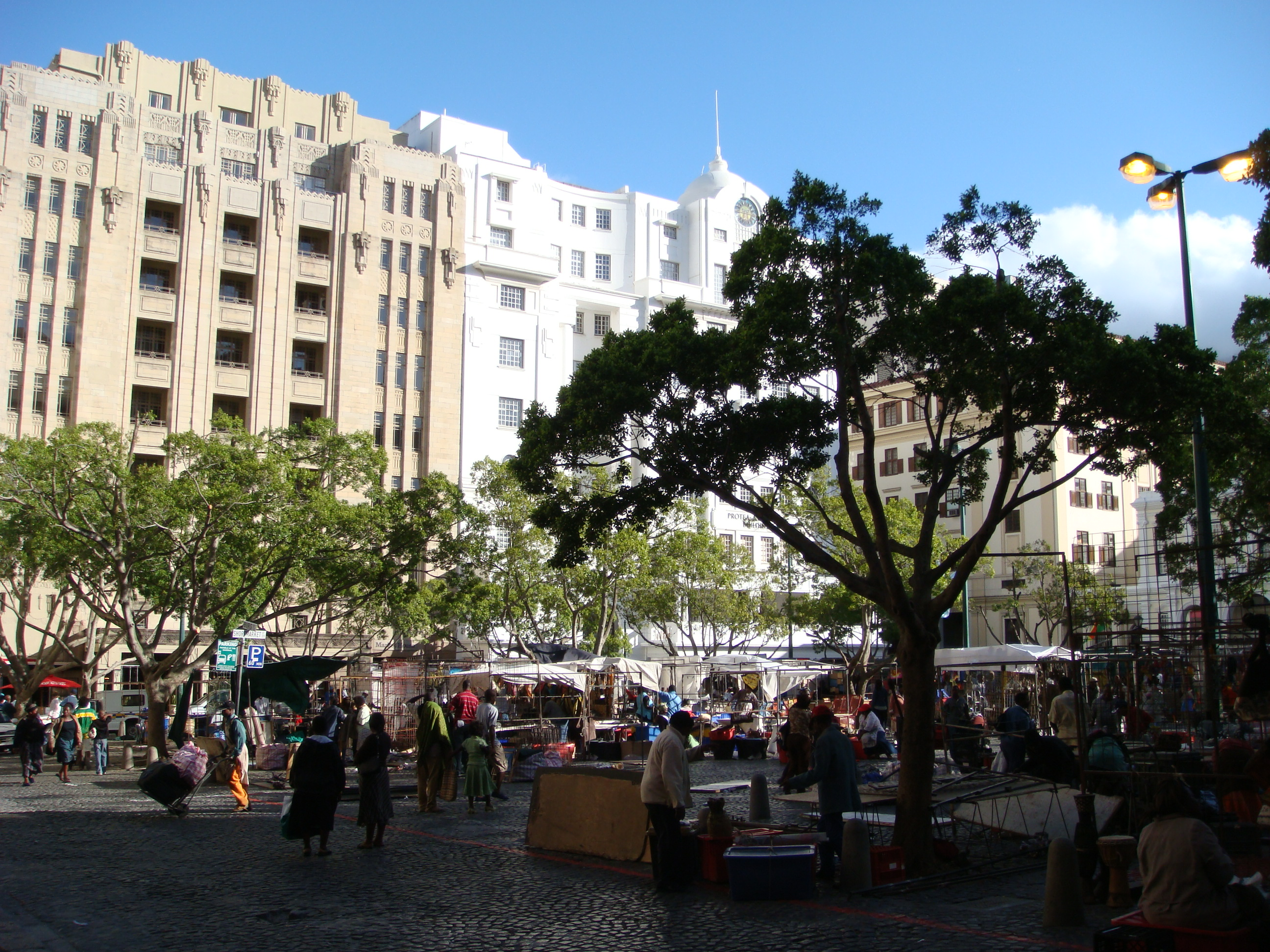
- The Commercial Union Building in 2007
- Click on the map for a fullscreen view

General information
- Location: Greenmarket Square, Cape Town, South Africa
- Coordinates: 33°55′22.29″S 18°25′14.11″E

The Commercial Union Building is a historic building located in Cape Town, South Africa.

== History ==
The building, erected in 1933 and designed by William Hood Grant, was constructed to house the headquarters of Commercial Union Assurance.

== Description ==
The building, overlooking Greenmarket Square in the centre of Cape Town, features an Art Deco style.

The building has ten floors, including the basement. The façades feature a vertical treatment that continues uninterrupted up to the refined precast stone decorations at the top of the structure. The entrances are adorned with bas-reliefs depicting griffins. Inside, the lobby has travertine walls and mosaic floors in golden tones.
