= Greenmarket Square refugee sit-in =

2019–2020 protest in South Africa

- Part of Xenophobia in South Africa
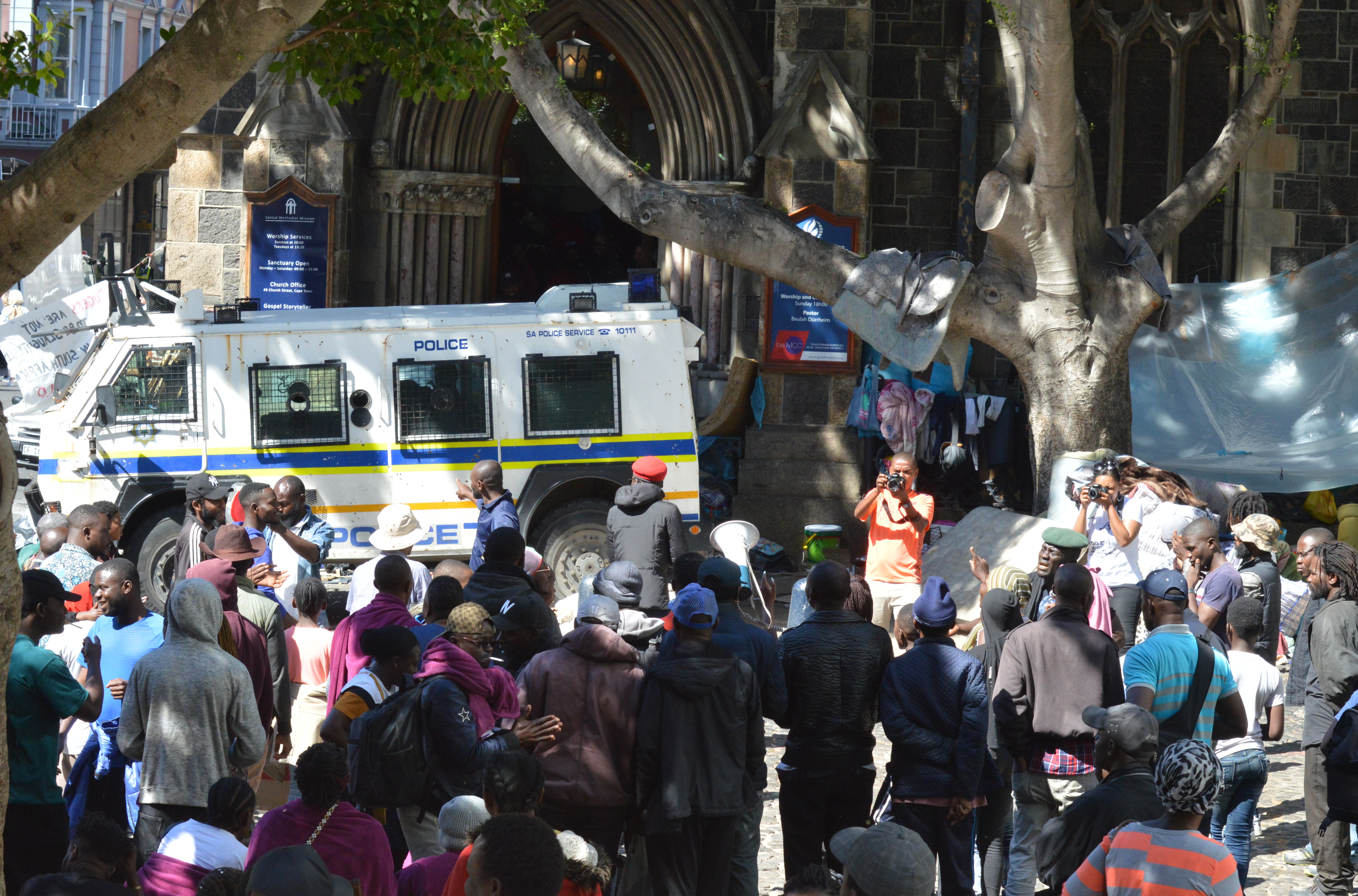
- Protestors outside the entrance to the Cape Town Central Methodist Church during the Greenmarket Square refugee sit-in. A police RG-12 Nyala can be seen blocking the entrance to the church following an altercation between two factions of protestors in late December 2019.
- Date: 8 October 2019 – 2 April 2020 (5 months, 3 weeks and 4 days)
- Location: Greenmarket Square, Cape Town, South Africa
- Caused by: Settlement to a third country; Xenophobia in South Africa
- Status: forcibly relocated
- Result: Xenophobic riots in Johannesburg

Parties
South African based foreign asylum seekers and refugees	UNHCR; South African Police Service; City of Cape Town; South African government; Department of Home Affairs

Lead figures
Participants: Jean-Pierre Balous; Papy Sukami; 250 - 624 total protestors	Participants: Jean-Pierre Smith; Aaron Motsoaledi

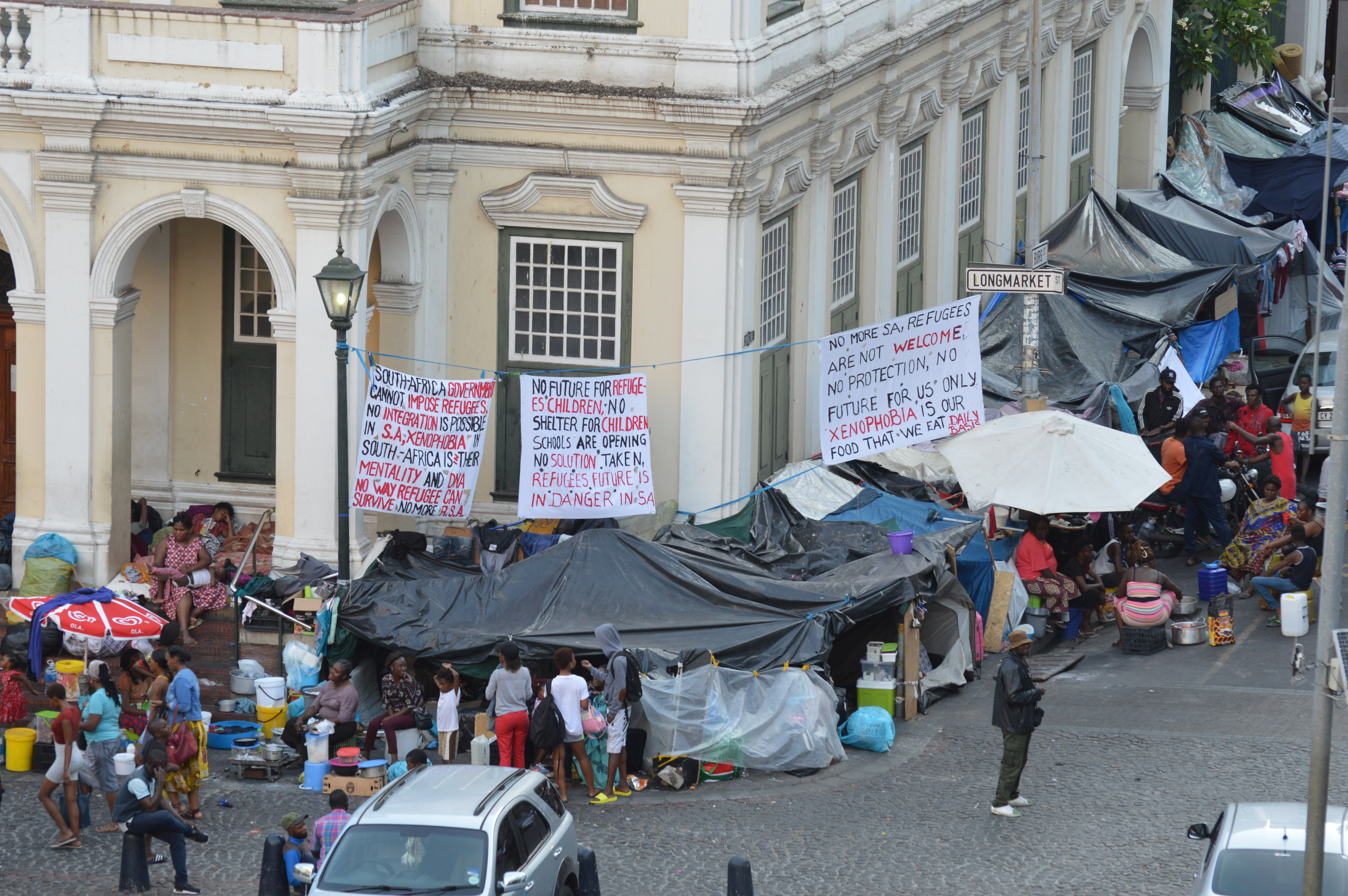
Protestors in mid-January 2020 occupying the area outside the Old Townhouse across the road from the Central Methodist Church which was occupied inside and outside by the protestors following their October 2019 eviction from the Waldorf Arcade.

The Greenmarket Square refugee sit-in was a sit-in protest by a group of refugees for the purpose of getting relocated to a country outside of South Africa in response to xenophobia in the country. It lasted from 8 October 2019 when protestors first occupied the Waldorf Arcade to 2 April 2020 when the last group of protestors were evicted from the Central Methodist Mission church. The protestors demanded that UNHCR assist them with being relocated to a third country outside of South Africa and other than their country of origin. At its height the protest grew to include about 624 protestors, including 65 undocumented refugees, according to a lawyer for the South African Department of Home Affairs.

South African police enforcing a court ordered eviction of protestors from the Waldorf Arcade on 30 October 2019. The protestors can be seen rejecting police calls and repeated warnings for them to voluntarily disperse. When police entered the Arcade protestors can be seen throwing projectiles and boiling milk at the police. Following the eviction the protest moved to the Central Methodist Mission.

== Timeline ==
=== Pretoria UNHCR sit-in ===
The sit-in started when around 250 protestors encamped outside the Cape Town offices of the United Nations High Commission for Refugees (UNHCR) on 8 October 2019, a month after the xenophobic motivated 2019 Johannesburg riots took place. A simultaneous protest by around 700 foreign refugees was also staged outside the UNHCR offices in Pretoria but were forcibly evicted on 17 November 2019 after protestors attempted to storm the UNHCR offices resulting in the arrest of 182 men, and temporary detention of 224 women and 169 children.

=== Waldorf Arcade sit-in ===
Initially starting at the UNHCR offices at the Waldorf Arcade on the east side of Greenmarket Square the sit-in moved to the Central Methodist Mission church on the square's west side after protesters were evicted on 30 October 2019. Rev Alan Storey offered the church as sanctuary to the protestors. The eviction of the protestors was controversial for the way in which it was implemented by South African Police.

=== Central Methodist Church sit-in ===
By 25 November around fifty of the protestors had accepted offers to be resettled in other parts of South Africa. The protestors again rejected a 27 January 2020 offer by the City of Cape Town to be resettled in Cape Town stating that they did not want to be sent back to the communities that they were trying to escape from. The City of Cape Town has argued that the refugees have furnished no evidence that they are homeless and that many of them have homes in the city.

By early December 2019 the Central Methodist Mission had stated on their blog that they had asked the refugees to leave the church. In the same month the City of Cape Town sought a court order granting them powers to arrest protestors for violating municipal by-laws. The court found that the city had to ensure that the human rights of protestors be protected before any penalties for infringing by-laws could be implemented.

By January 2020 concerns were increasingly raised about acts of violence between factions of protestors, sanitary conditions, as well as fire safety and overcrowding inside the Central Methodist Church. The long-term, continued presence of the protestors has had a serious negative impact on surrounding businesses, many of whom cater to tourists that visit the square. This negative economic impact also included market stall traders located on the square who saw a serious decrease in business. Surrounding businesses set up a Crisis Committee to stem loss of profits and business closures after the Burger King restaurant closed resulting in job losses for 15 people.

On 17 February 2020 the Western Cape High Court issued a judgement allowing the City of Cape Town to enforce municipal by-laws on protestors located outside of the Central Methodist Mission. The judgment also stated that the City of Cape Town must provide a venue and that the Department of Home Affairs must process the protesting refugees and determine their individual status and verification. The City of Cape Town initially postponed the court-ordered removal of the protestors due to the need to translate the court order into multiple non-South African languages so it could be effectively served to the protesters and so that other requirements of the court order could be met by the City of Cape Town.

=== Eviction from outside the Methodist Mission ===
City of Cape Town alderman for safety and security Jean-Pierre Smith stated that the protesters would likely be removed around 1 March. The protestors located outside the Central Methodist Church were subsequently evicted by Cape Town Metropolitan Police on 1 March 2020, while those inside the church were not evicted. Following the second eviction the protestors temporarily relocated to St Mary's Cathedral where they were evicted again and then went on to McKenzie Road Park before moving again to the area outside of the Cape Town Central Police Station. Speaking for the City of Cape Town, Jean-Pierre Smith stated that a total of 781 protestors were recorded during the court mandated processing of refugee applications before evictions could take place. Smith stated that the SAPS had refused to arrest protestors who were in violation of the court order.

In late March the section led by Papy Sukami and now located outside the Central Police station requested that the City of Cape Town provide them accommodation during the period of the government-ordered national shutdown during the COVID-19 pandemic. The group remaining in the Central Methodist Church, led by Balous, stated that they would not move in spite of the pandemic until they were provided with alternative accommodation they considered to be dignified and safe.

=== Eviction from the Methodist Mission ===
On 2 April 2020 the last group of protestors were evicted from inside the Methodist Mission by SAPS following forcible evacuation orders in compliance with the nationwide lockdown during the COVID-19 pandemic. Rumors of possible violent resistance to the eviction proved unfounded as the protestors complied with police instructions to board buses to temporary accommodation provided by the City of Cape Town once the front and rear doors of the church had been broken down by police.

== Demands ==
UNHCR stated that their demands to be moved en masse to a third country were impossible as UNHCR can only process resettlement on a strict individual basis established by receiving countries. A South African NGO that was providing food to the protestors, Gift of the Givers, was told to leave the protestors and stop all charitable activity with them after the organisation's leader publicly stated that the protestors demands for resettlement were "unrealistic." The South African Minister of Home Affairs, Aaron Motsoaledi, stated that the protestors demands for resettlement to a third country were "impossible" for the South African government to deliver on.

== Violence ==
Following the October eviction from the Waldorf Arcade one of the sit-in leaders was accused of violently assaulting a group of religious leaders, including Anglican Archbishop Thabo Makgoba, during a meeting at the Central Methodist Mission.

By late December 2019 the protestors had split into two hostile groups with one side led by Jean-Pierre Balous (based in the Methodist Mission) and another by Papy Sukami (based in the street outside the Methodist Mission). Violent conflict between two factions of protestors resulted in the arrest of three people by police on 29 December. The faction led by Sukami demanded that Balous and his followers leave the church. Sukami was accused by two Congolese journalists of assault and robbery; he denied the accusation but was arrested on charges relating to the event in early January 2020 following the arrest of Balous. Following the violence a restraining order was imposed on Balous requiring him to receive permission from the police before entering the Cape Town City Bowl area. A South African Human Rights Commissioner stated on national TV that Balous made threats against his life following court proceedings.

== See also ==
- Carte Blanche current affairs news story: Refugees in Greenmarket Square - 20 January 2020.
