= 2015 South African xenophobic riots =

Attack on foreigners in Durban and Johannesburg

Durban Xenophobic attack 2015
- Location: Durban and Johannesburg, South Africa
- Date: 11 April 2015 (UTC-4)
- Deaths: 7

On 11 April 2015, several South Africans attacked foreigners in a xenophobic attack in Durban, South Africa, which extended to some parts of Johannesburg. Several people, both foreign and South African alike, were killed with some of the killings captured on camera.

== Background ==
In South Africa, there is a sentiment prevalent among a sizable portion of unemployed South Africans that immigrants and expatriates from other parts of Africa who reside in South Africa are responsible for the high unemployment rate that South Africa has. This sentiment sometimes results in such South Africans attacking African expatriates and foreigners, as happened in 2008, with the ultimate goal of driving them out of South Africa. This sentiment is exacerbated by comments from public figures in support it. In this case, some have said it was sparked by an alleged statement by the Zulu King Goodwill Zwelithini demanding that all foreigners leave South Africa and "go back to their countries", leaving South Africa more jobs for the unemployed youth of South Africa.

== Attacks ==
Locals looted foreigners' shops and attacked immigrants in general, forcing hundreds to relocate to police stations across the country. The Malawian authorities subsequently began repatriating their nationals, and a number of other foreign governments also announced that they would evacuate their citizens. More than 300 people were arrested. On 18 April 2015 a photographer from the Sunday Times, James Oatway, photographed a brutal attack on a Mozambican man. The man, Emmanuel Sithole, died from his wounds. Four suspects were arrested within days of the publication of photographs in the 19 April edition of The Sunday Times of the murder of Mozambican street vendor Emmanuel Sithole in Alexandra township the previous day. Sithole's name is not included in the official list of seven victims killed in the April 2015 attacks, including an Ethiopian, a Mozambican, a Bangladeshi, a Zimbabwean and three South Africans who were all killed in KwaZulu-Natal.

Despite the government's insistence that Sithole's murder was not xenophobic, the South African National Defence Force (SANDF) was deployed in Alexandra township following the publication of the images. On 23 April several thousand demonstrators marched through central Johannesburg to protest against a spate of deadly attacks on immigrants. They sang songs denouncing xenophobia and carried banners that read "We are all Africans" as migrant workers crowded balconies, shouting their support.

== Deaths and casualties ==
In all seven people were reported dead as a result of the violence. The dead included both South Africans and foreigners.

== Aftermath ==
After the incident over 5,000 people took part in a rally held in Durban to show their displeasure with the attacks.

Following this incidents many African countries had strained diplomatic relations with South Africa. Nigeria recalled its High Commissioner in South Africa following this event.

== See also ==
- 2019 Johannesburg riots
