= Rainbow nation =

Term used to describe post-apartheid South Africa

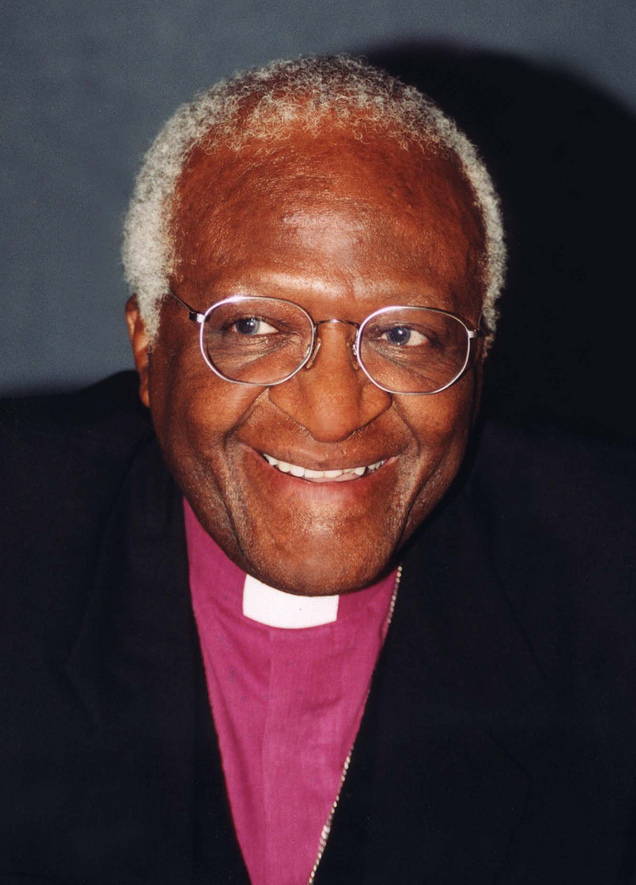
Archbishop Desmond Tutu is credited with coining the phrase Rainbow nation.

Rainbow nation is a term coined by Archbishop Desmond Tutu to describe post-apartheid South Africa after South Africa's first democratic election in 1994.

The phrase was elaborated upon by President Nelson Mandela in his first month of office, when he proclaimed: "Each of us is as intimately attached to the soil of this beautiful country as are the famous jacaranda trees of Pretoria and the mimosa trees of the bushveld – a rainbow nation at peace with itself and the world."

== Symbolic identity ==
The many migrations that formed the modern rainbow nation

The term was intended to encapsulate the unity of multi-culturalism and the coming-together of people of many different nations, in a country once identified with the strict division of white and black under the Apartheid regime.

In a series of televised appearances, Tutu spoke of the "Rainbow People of God". As a cleric, this metaphor drew upon the Old Testament story of Noah's Flood and its ensuing rainbow of peace. Within South African indigenous cultures, the rainbow is associated with hope and a bright future.

The secondary metaphor the rainbow allows is more political. Unlike the primary metaphor, the room for different cultural interpretations of the colour spectrum is slight. Whether the rainbow has Isaac Newton's seven colours, or five of the Nguni (i.e. Xhosa and Zulu) cosmology, the colours are not taken literally to represent particular cultural groups.

== Rainbow influence ==
South African national flag

Rainbow nation as a spoken metaphor for South African unity is uniquely but not deliberately represented by the South African flag, which sports six different colours.

== Rainbowism ==
South African political commentators have been known to speculate on rainbowism, whereby true domestic issues such as the legacy of racism, crime, and the like are glossed over and sugar-coated by the cover of rainbow peace. South African politician, academic, and noted poet Jeremy Cronin cautions: "Allowing ourselves to sink into a smug rainbowism will prove to be a terrible betrayal of the possibilities for real transformation, real reconciliation, and real national unity that are still at play in our contemporary South African reality."

It has been argued that rainbowism was associated with a unique, post-apartheid South African socio-political trajectory at the end of the 20th century, which initially contrasted with conventional post-colonialism. Since then, the post-apartheid epoch and associated concepts such as rainbowism and nation building have been displaced by orthodox post-colonialism in South Africa.

== See also ==
- Multiculturalism
- Multiracial democracy
- Nation building
- Noahidism
- Proudly South African
- Rainbow Family of Living Light
- Rainbow flag
- Rainbow Nation Peace Ritual
