= Greenmarket Square =

Historical square in old Cape Town, South Africa

- {{{other_names}}}
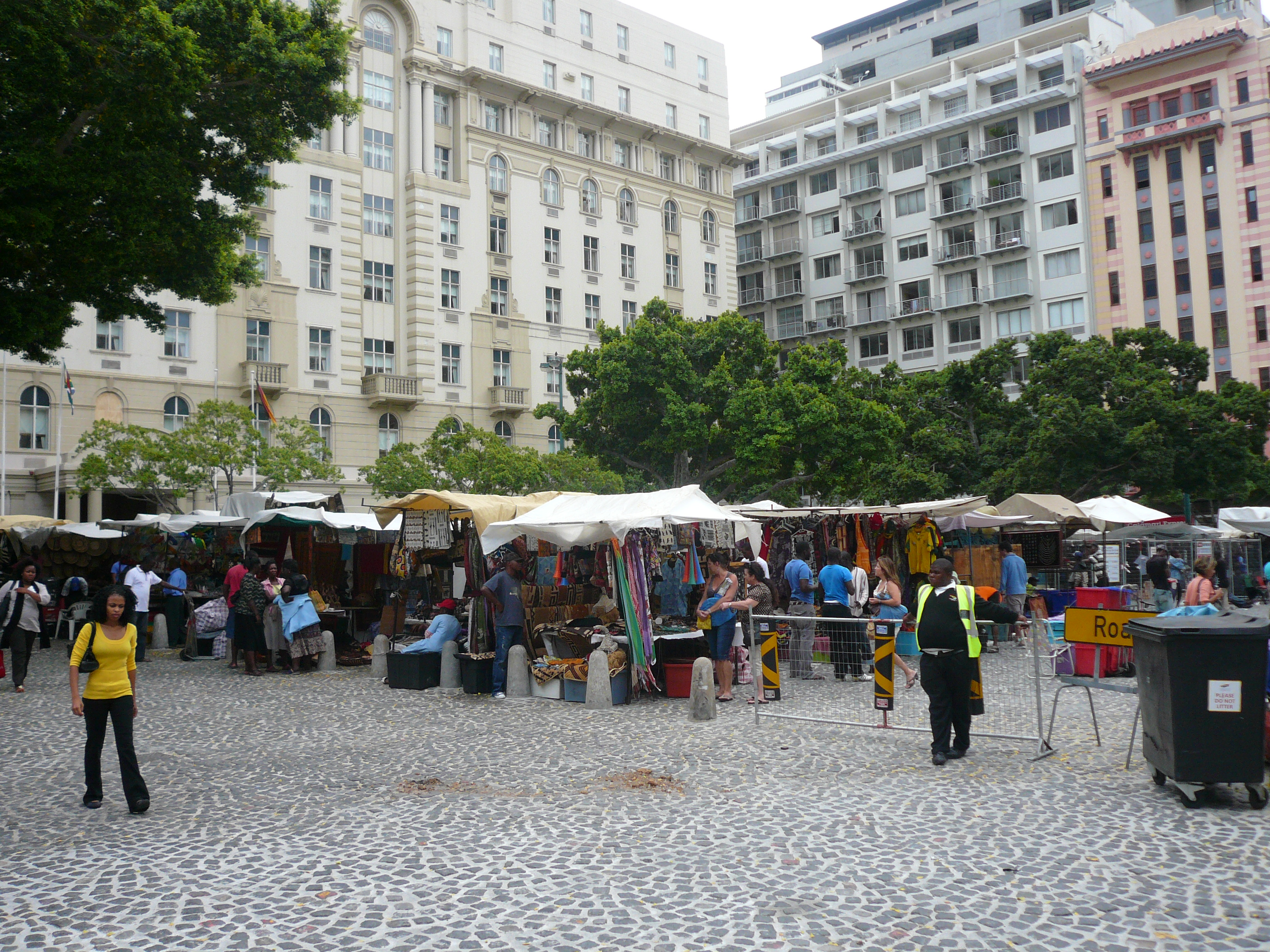
- Greenmarket Square as seen from Burg Street and Longmarket Street
- Location: City of Cape Town, Western Cape, South Africa
- Street map of Greenmarket Square in Cape Town.
- Coordinates: 33°55′20″S 18°25′12″E

Greenmarket Square is a historical square in the centre of old Cape Town, South Africa. The square was built in 1696, when a burgher watch house was erected. Many historic buildings surround the square, including the Old Town House, which now houses the Michaelis Collection of art.

Over the years, the square has served as a slave market, a vegetable market, a parking lot and more recently, a flea market trading mainly African souvenirs, crafts, and curios. Near the centre of the square is a hand-operated pump used to bring clean water to the surface from an underground river that runs through the city. During the apartheid era, Greenmarket Square was often the focus of political protests, due in part to its proximity to parliament, as well as the ethnicity of its traders and shoppers.

== Location ==
The square is located in the centre of the city bowl area of Cape Town's city centre between St George's Mall to the south east and Long Street to the square's north west. Strand Street is located to the north of the square and Wale Street to the South. The area in front of the front door of the Old Town House on the square is regarded as the historical centre of Cape Town. Shortmarket Street and Longmarket Street border the square on either side with Burg Street running through the middle of the square.

== History ==
=== Early history ===
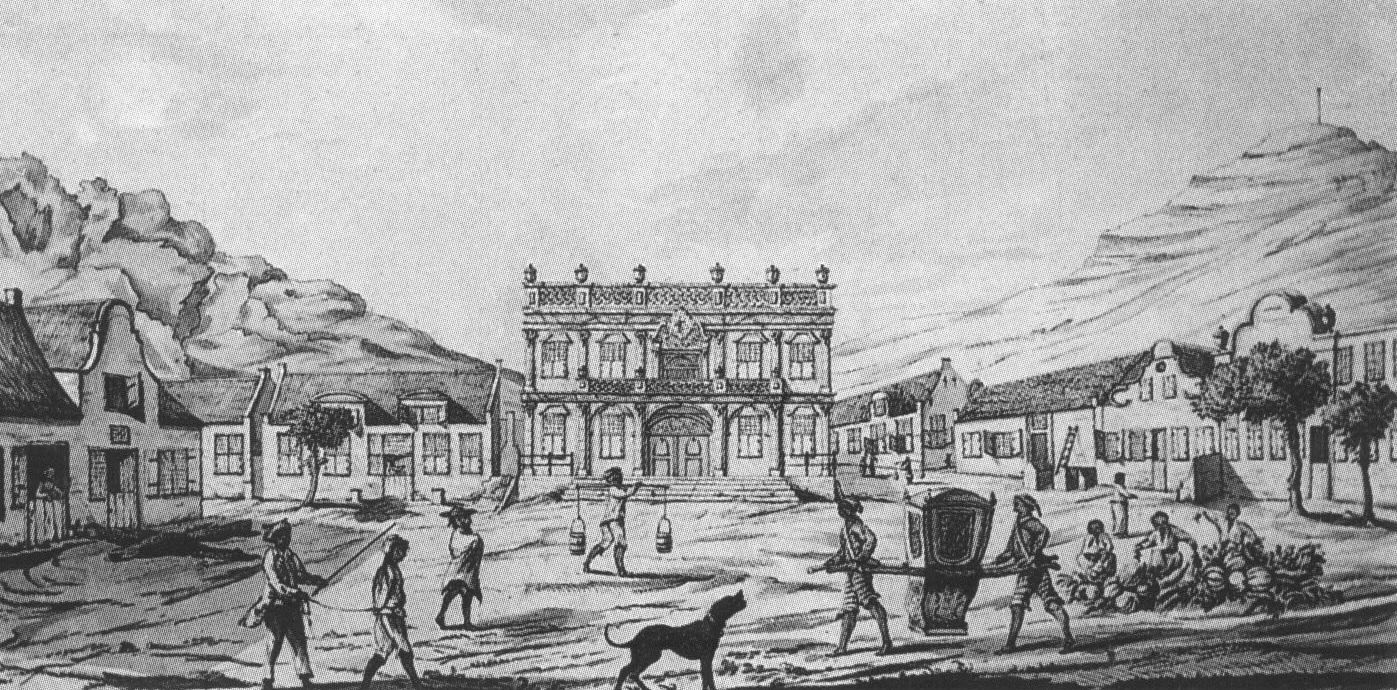
Greenmarket Square in 1762 with the Old Town House in the background

In the years following Cape Town's establishment in 1652 a number of streets came into existence above Strand Street (which followed the natural shoreline) and the Company Gardens which initially functioned as a market garden run by the Dutch East India Company to supply ships. The square developed naturally as the venue for the sale of fresh produce from the garden and surrounding farms. The sale of other goods and services including the sale of slaves followed shortly after. A fountain was established as a key point for townspeople to access drinking water.

Following its establishment as a market the square became the administrative and social centre of the town with the construction of a burger watch house in 1696 to provide security. By the 1730s rural style thatch-roofed dwellings around the square began to be replaced by flat-roofed single and multiple story houses.

In 1761, the watch house was demolished and the Old Town House built in the site, which now houses the Michaelis Collection of art. This building functioned as the city hall and Burgher Watch House for a period of time.

=== Nineteenth and twentieth centuries ===
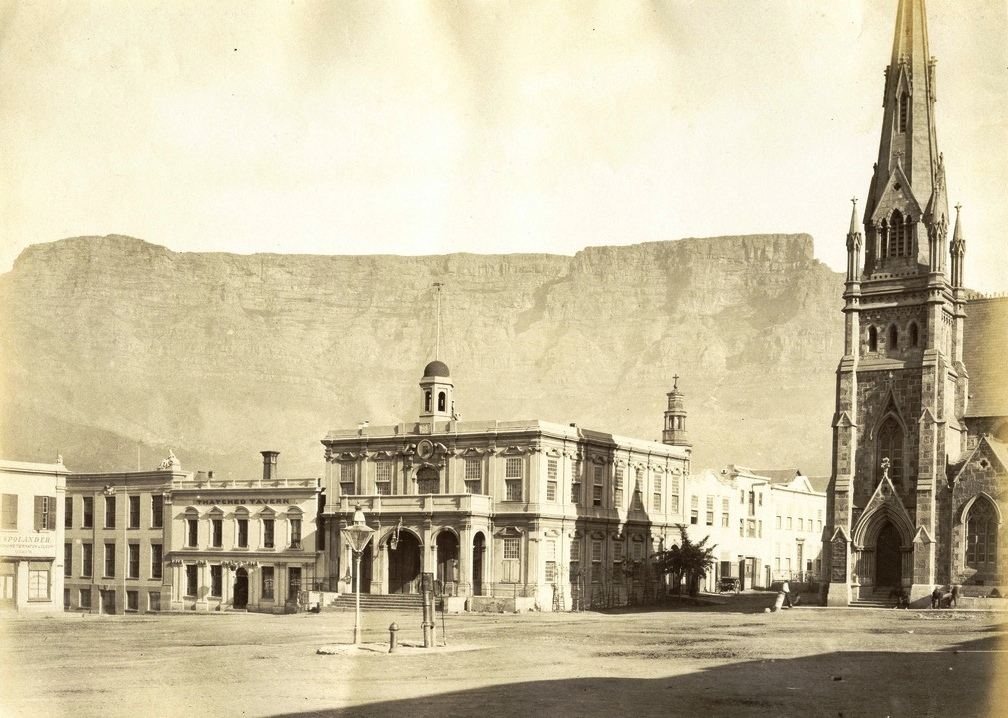
The square in 1876. The pump can be seen in the foreground with the Old Town House in the background and the Central Methodist Church on the right.

Nearly all the single-storied buildings round the square had been replaced with taller buildings by 1845. In 1879 the Central Metropolitan Church was constructed on the square.

The square lost its prominence following the completion of the Cape Town city hall in 1905 whereupon trading moved to the Grand Parade opposite the city hall. In the 1930s a number of art deco style buildings were constructed around the square.

In 1936 Newspaper House, located on the south corner of the square, was completed and became the headquarters and printing press of a number of local newspapers such as the Cape Times and Cape Argus.

In the 1950s the square was turned into a parking lot. The square and surrounding buildings were declared a national monument in 1961. In the late-1980s the parking lot was replaced with a flea market trading African curios and crafts and rented out to private vendors. In September 1989 the square was the centre of the Purple Rain Protest against apartheid.

In the mid-1990s until 2007 the square was run by controversial city counsellor Badih Chaaban who held a lease on 83% of the square and owed the city R3.3 million. Chaaban's lease was cancelled in 2007 amid accusations of mismanagement and corruption. South Africa's oldest tobacconist, Sturks Tobacco (opening on 1 August 1793), was located on the square until the COVID-19 pandemic and resulting tobacco sales ban resulted in its closure in June 2020.

== Current status ==
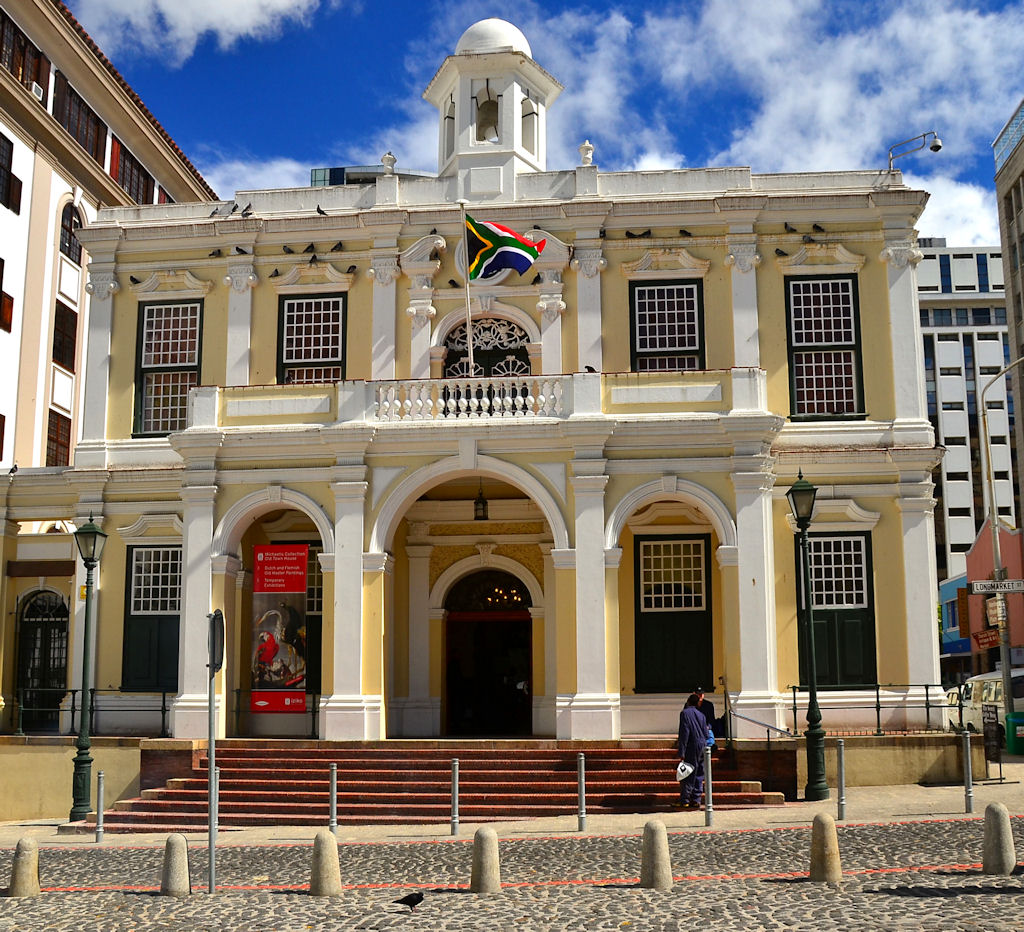
The Old Town House on Greenmarket Square is the best known building on the square and one of the oldest buildings in South Africa. It also houses the Michaelis Collection.

The square was pedestrianised in the early-2000s allowing for better market access and greater pedestrian safety. As of 2016 the Cape Town CCID had been appointed to run the square and conduct research into how it and the trading stores could be improved.

== See also ==
- Purple Rain Protest
- Rainbow Nation Peace Ritual
- Michaelis Collection
- Greenmarket Square refugee sit-in
