= Sturk's Tobacconists =

Oldest tobacco shop in South Africa

Coordinates: 33.922174°S 18.419953°E

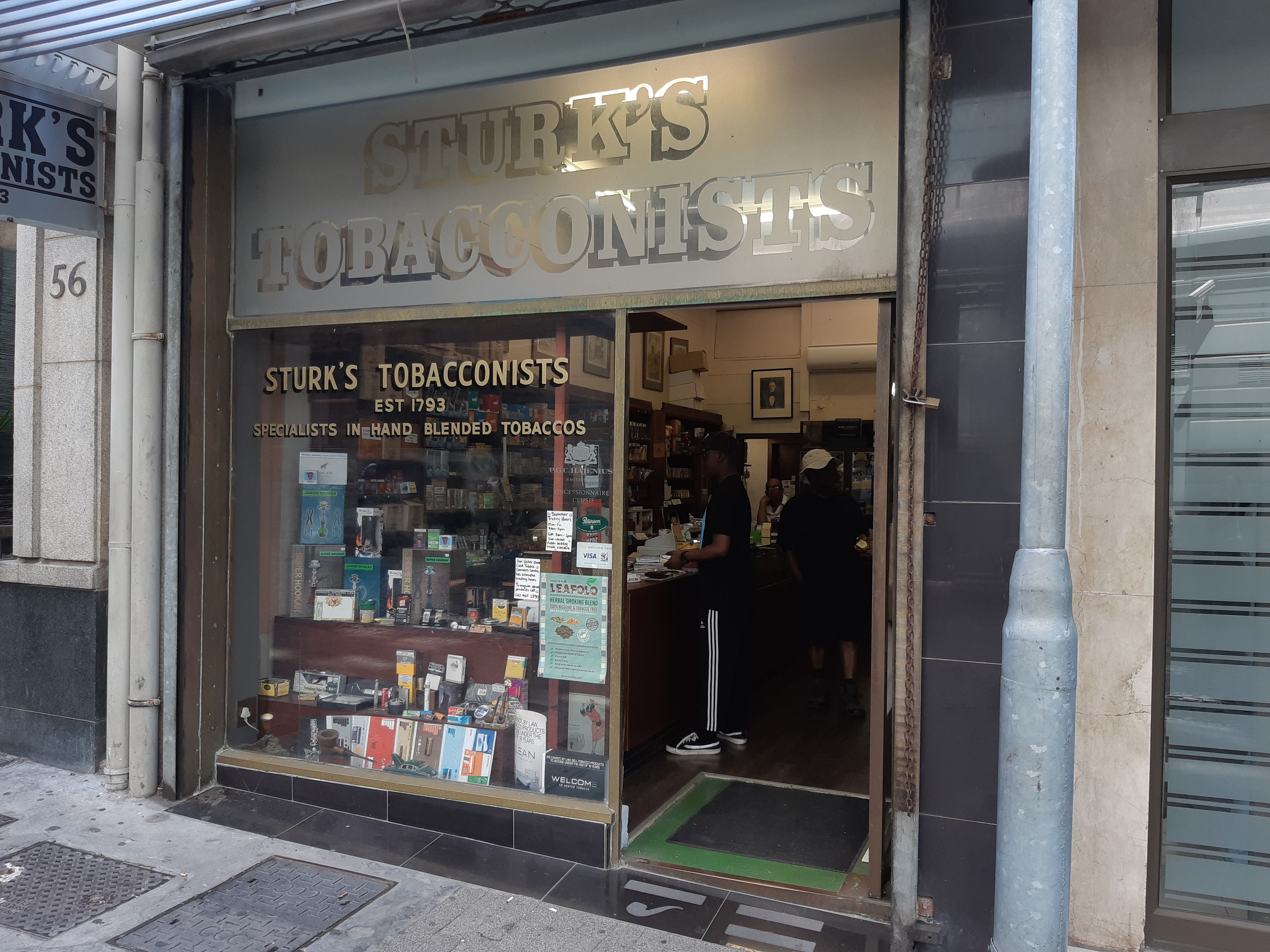
- Sturk's Tobacconist shop at Greenmarket Square, Cape Town in 2019.
- Founded: August 1, 1793; 232 years ago in Cape Town, South Africa
- Headquarters: Greenmarket Square, Cape Town, South Africa
- Products: tobacco products
- Website: www.sturks.co.za

Sturk's Tobacconists is a tobacconist based in Greenmarket Square, Cape Town, South Africa. Founded on 1 August 1793, it is notable for being the oldest tobacconist, and possibly the oldest business, in South Africa. Its physical location closed down due to the COVID-19 pandemic and the resulting tobacco sales ban during the pandemic lockdown period.
