= Tobacconist =

Retailer of tobacco and other products

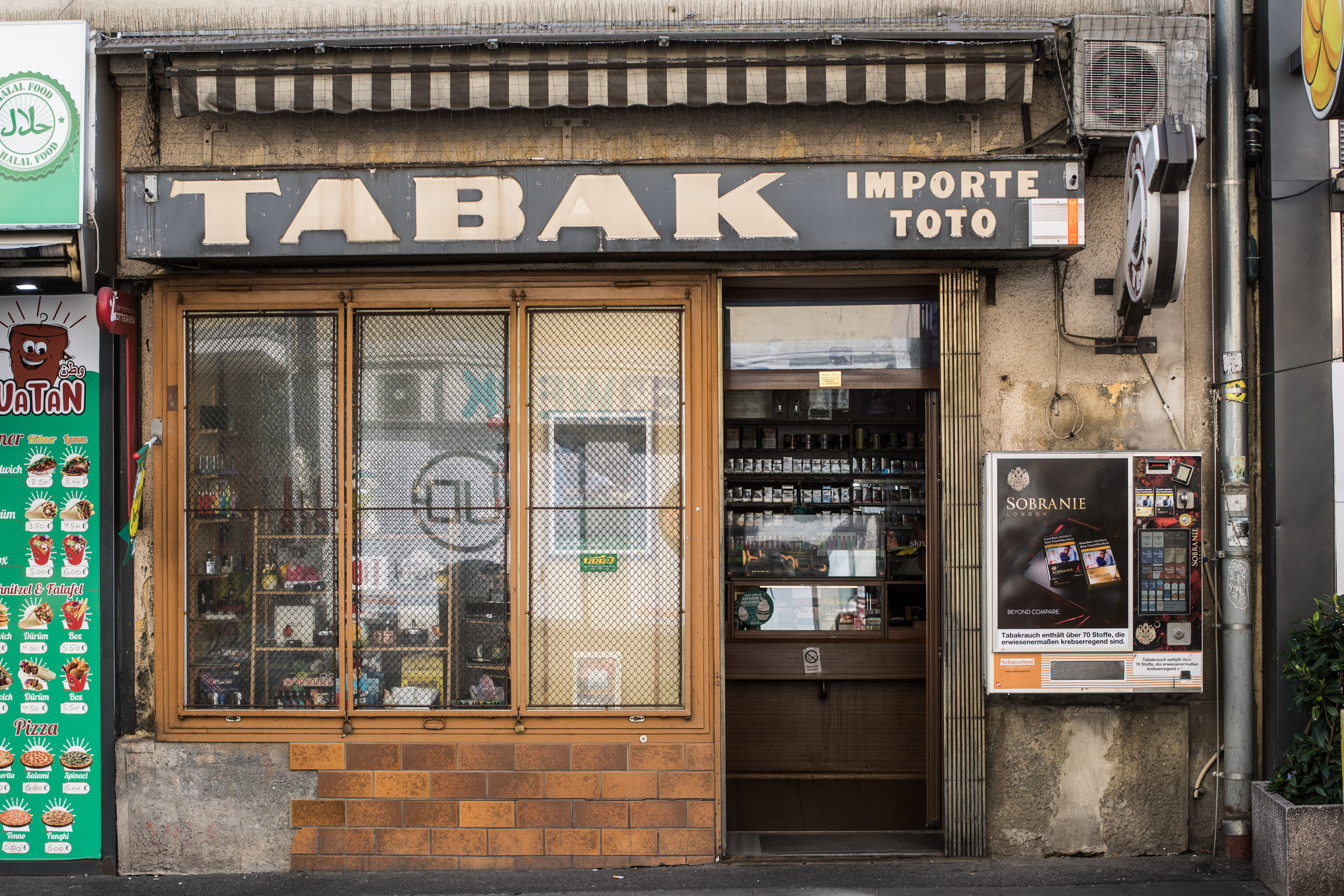
A Tabak-Trafik tobacconist's shop in Vienna, Austria (photograph taken in 2024). The depicted tobacconist shop was modernised in 2025.

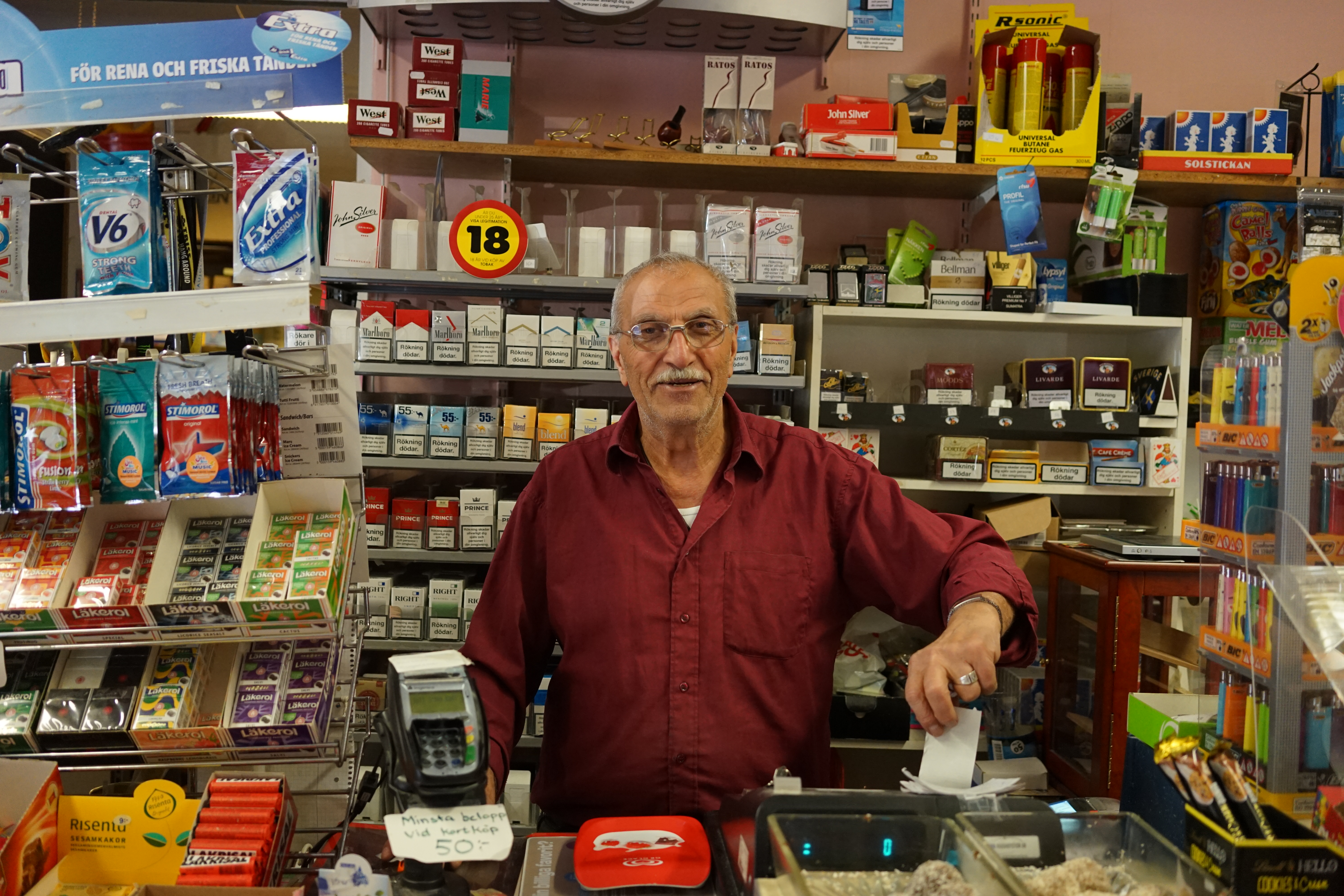
A tobacconist in Stockholm, Sweden

A tobacconist, also called a tobacco shop, a tobacconist's shop or a smoke shop, is a retail business that sells tobacco products in various forms and the related accoutrements, such as pipes, lighters, matches, pipe cleaners, and pipe tampers. More specialized retailers might sell ashtrays, humidification devices, hygrometers, humidors, cigar cutters, and more. Books and magazines, especially ones related to tobacco are commonly offered. Items irrelevant to tobacco such as puzzles, games, party supplies, figurines, hip flasks, walking sticks, and confectionery are sometimes sold.

In the United States, a tobacconist shop was traditionally represented by a wooden Indian positioned nearby. Most retailers of tobacco sell other types of product; today supermarkets, in many countries with a special counter, are usually the main sellers of the common brands of cigarette.

In the United Kingdom, a common combination in small corner shops has been a newsagent selling newspapers and magazines, as well as confectionery and tobacco. In UK marketing and retailing this sector is referred to as "CONTOB" ("confectionery and tobacco").

A tabac or tabaccheria is a shop licensed to sell tobacco products in France, Spain and Italy. Tabacs also sell newspapers, telephone cards, postage stamps and multi-journey bus tickets.

== Services and stock ==
Specialist tobacconists are in theory educated and practiced in all things related to tobacco including its different forms, colors, scents, textures and tastes. They employ this knowledge to provide information regarding customers about the tobacco products. Due to the decline in the tobacco industry in recent decades and widespread use of mass-produced tobacco products, tobacconists have become scarce, though many smokers still prefer to buy their products from a tobacco shop with a tobacconist behind the counter.

Standard tobacco shops in the United States generally specialize in cigarettes, roll-your-own supplies, smokeless tobacco such as nasal snuff, dipping tobacco and chewing tobacco, as well as cigars, and pipe tobacco. More recently, these smoke shops may also carry vaping supplies, and some may also double as head shops.

More upscale tobacco shops tend to have a much larger emphasis on cigars and pipe tobacco. Many of these establishments will have a walk-in humidor, as well as a smoking lounge or even a bar. These stores, often categorizing themselves specifically as a cigar store generally have limited amounts of the other commonplace forms of tobacco. There are now smaller online tobacconists calling themselves Boutique Online Stores these stores are 24 hour operated stores, these stores are more specialized with emphasis on service and knowledge.

== Regulations ==
In countries where tobacco control laws are strong, tobacconists may have their trade limited. In the United States, it is common for retail pharmacies to sell cigarettes and similar products on the same premises as over-the-counter drugs and prescription medication. Campaigners in the USA advocate the removal of tobacco from pharmacies due to the health risks associated with smoking and the apparent contradiction of selling cigarettes alongside smoking cessation products and asthma medication. Pharmaceutical retailers counter this argument by reasoning that by selling tobacco, they are more readily able to offer to customers advice and products for quitting smoking.

Some tobacco shop owners in the US are concerned about the 2016 Food and Drug Administration (FDA) regulations for electronic cigarettes. The 2010 FDA regulations caused some inconveniences for local tobacco shops in Cullman, Alabama, US. The US Family Smoking Prevention and Tobacco Control Act, has restricted marketing, particularly to minors; prohibited flavored cigarettes (excluding menthol); removed descriptions including "light", "mild", and "low-tar" from cigarette packs; and made larger the dimensions of warning labels on smokeless tobacco. Anyone under the age of 21 is not allowed entry to any US self-service tobacco shop, even if going with an adult.

== Gallery ==
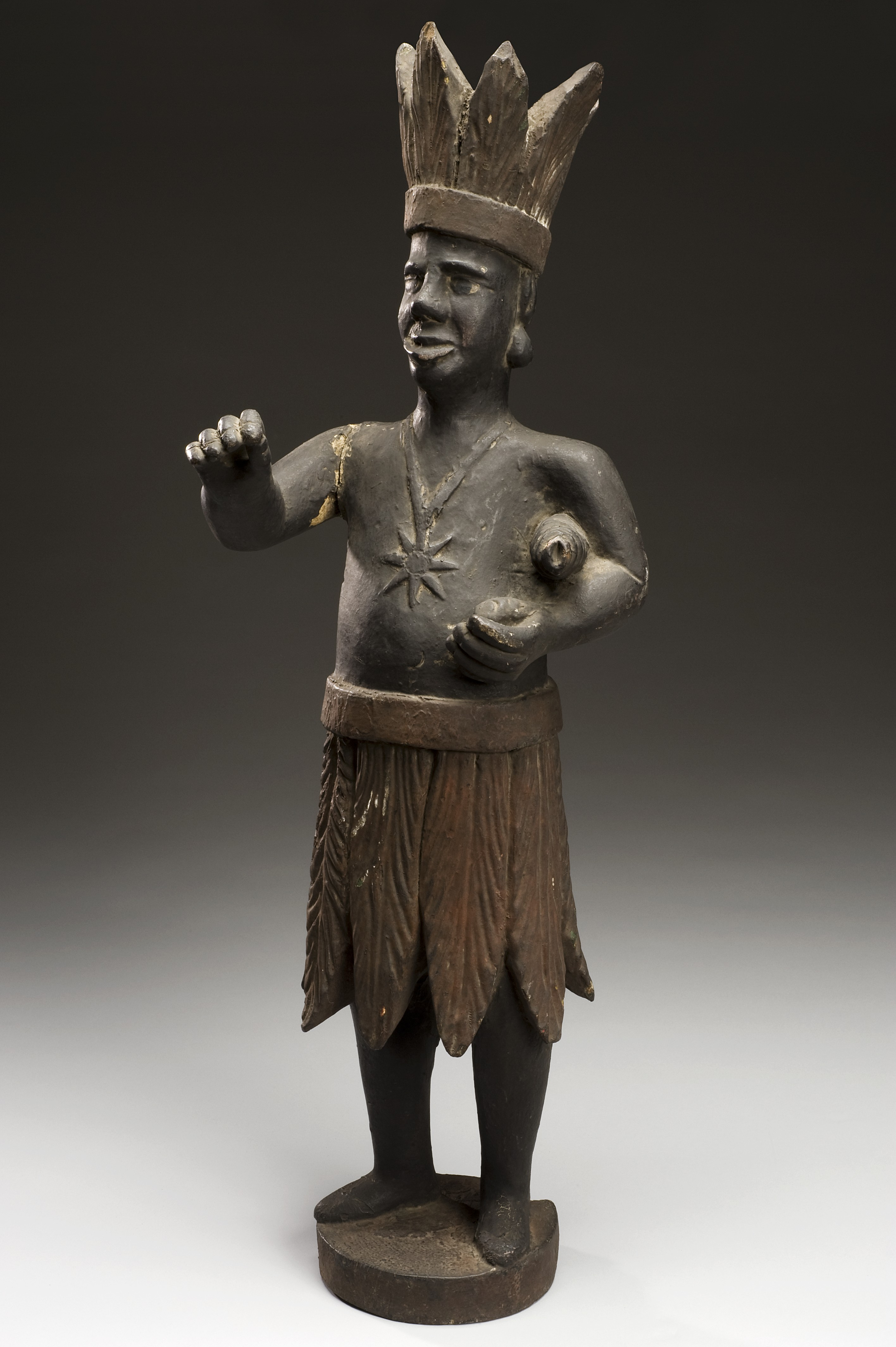
Cigar store Indian made c. 1750 and used to advertise a tobacconist's shop in England until 1900

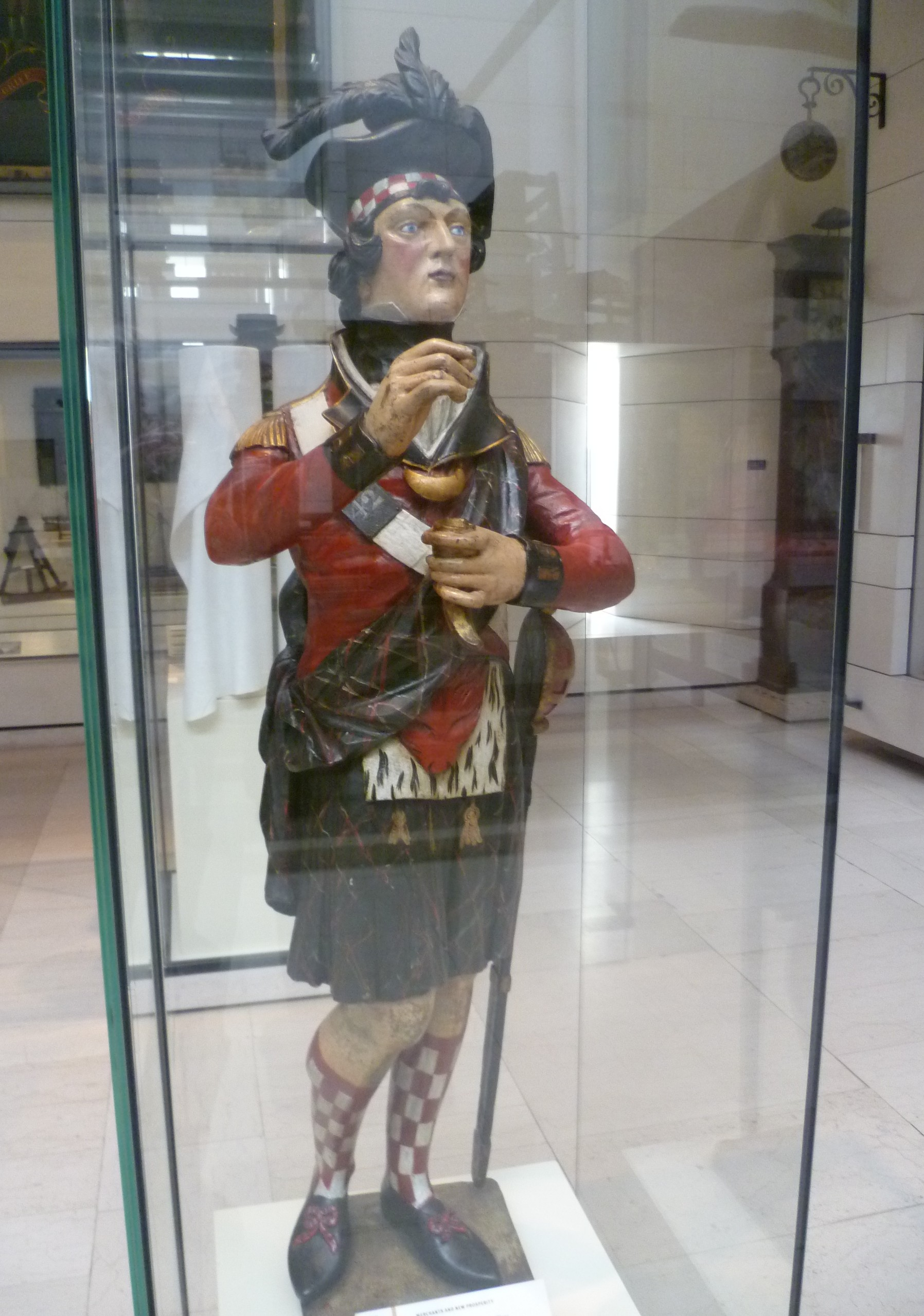
18th-century advertising figure for a British tobacconist

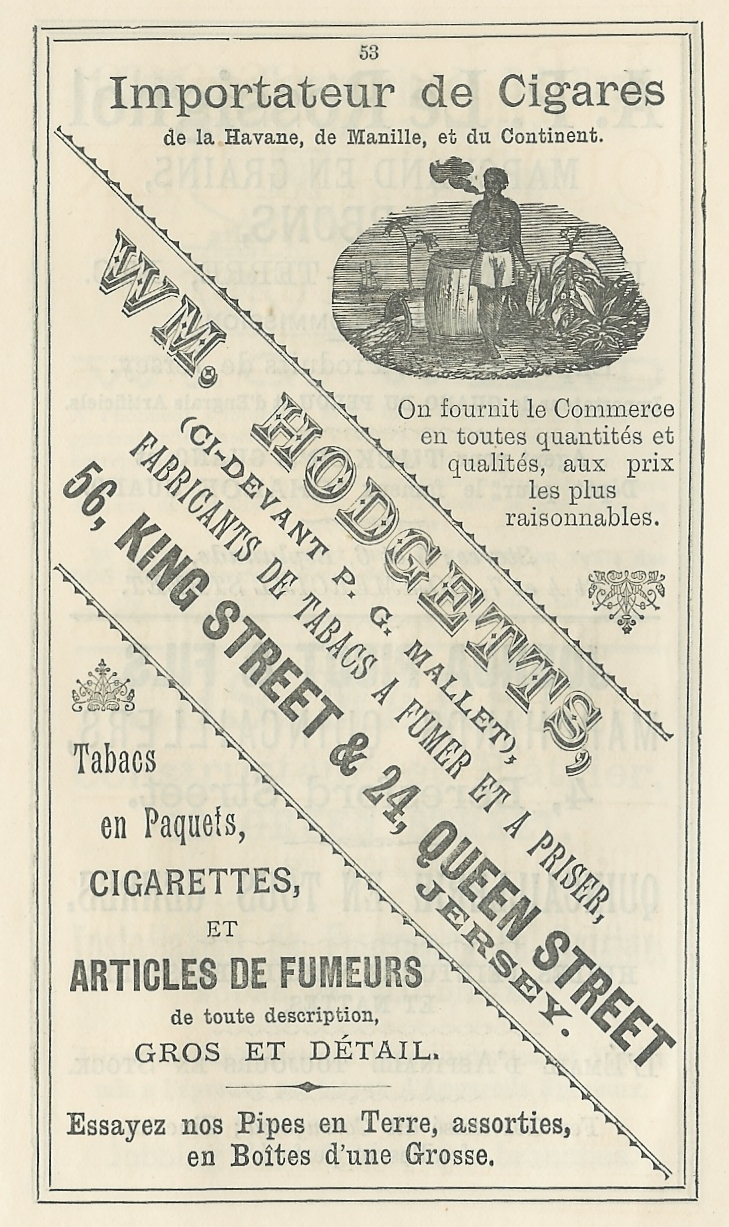
An advertisement for a tobacconist from the almanac of La Chronique de Jersey, 1892

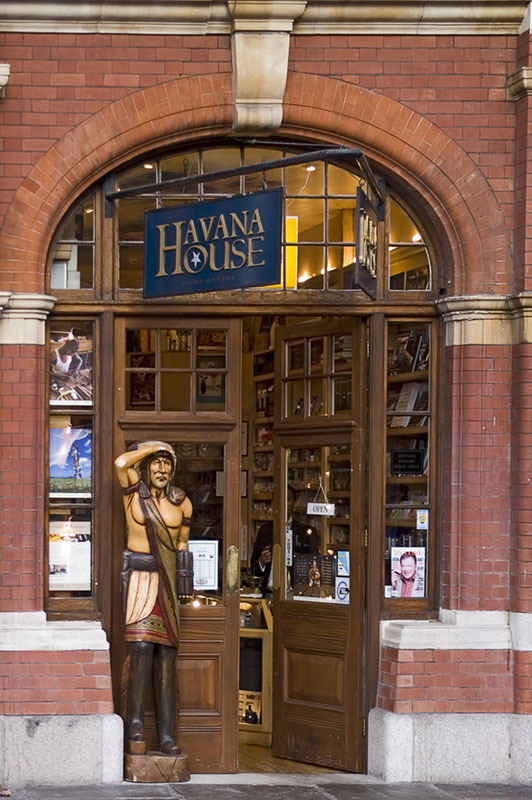
Modern tobacconist in Windsor, UK

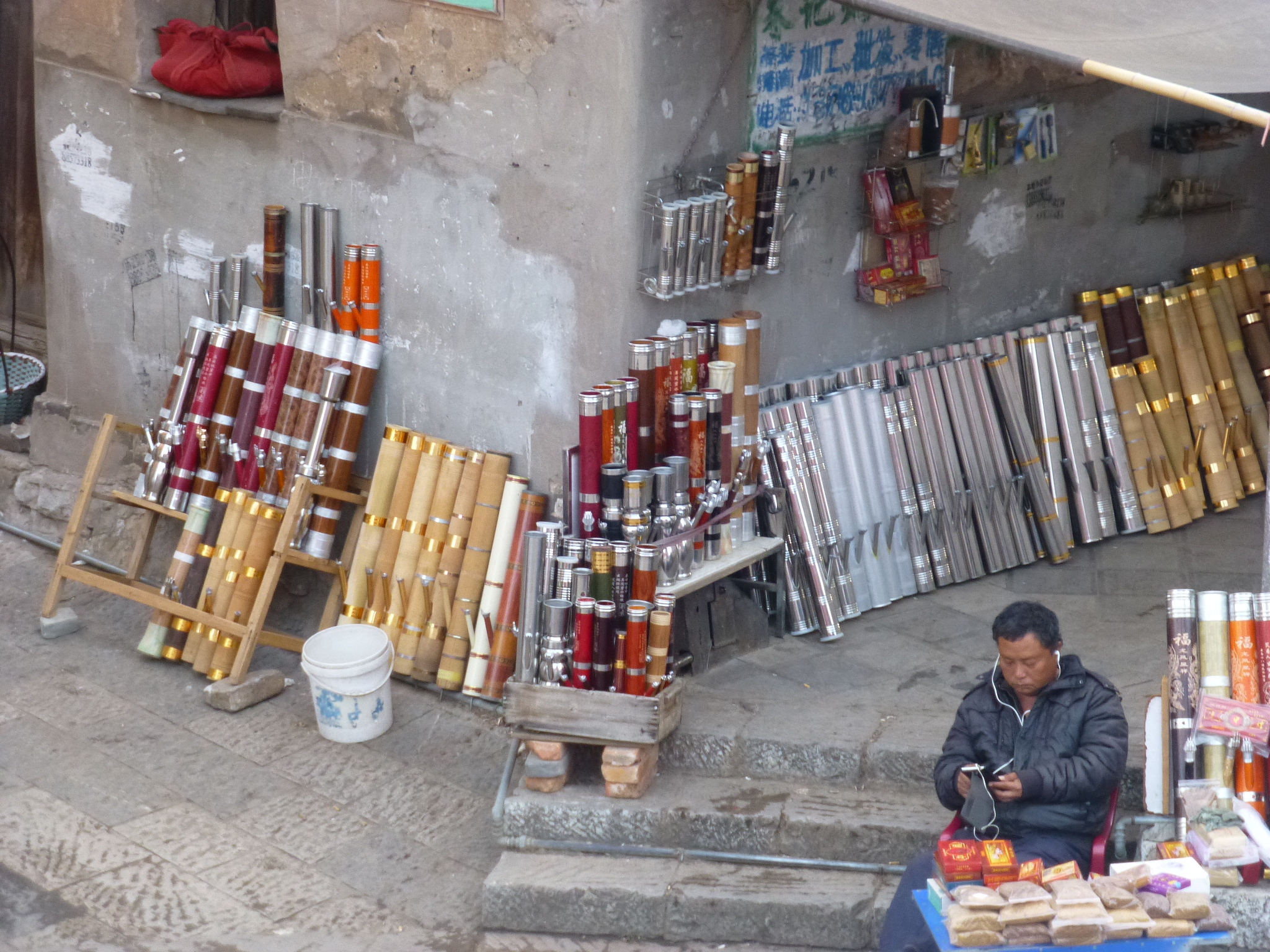
A vendor of tobacco and traditional Yunnan smoking pipes in Jianshui, Yunnan, China

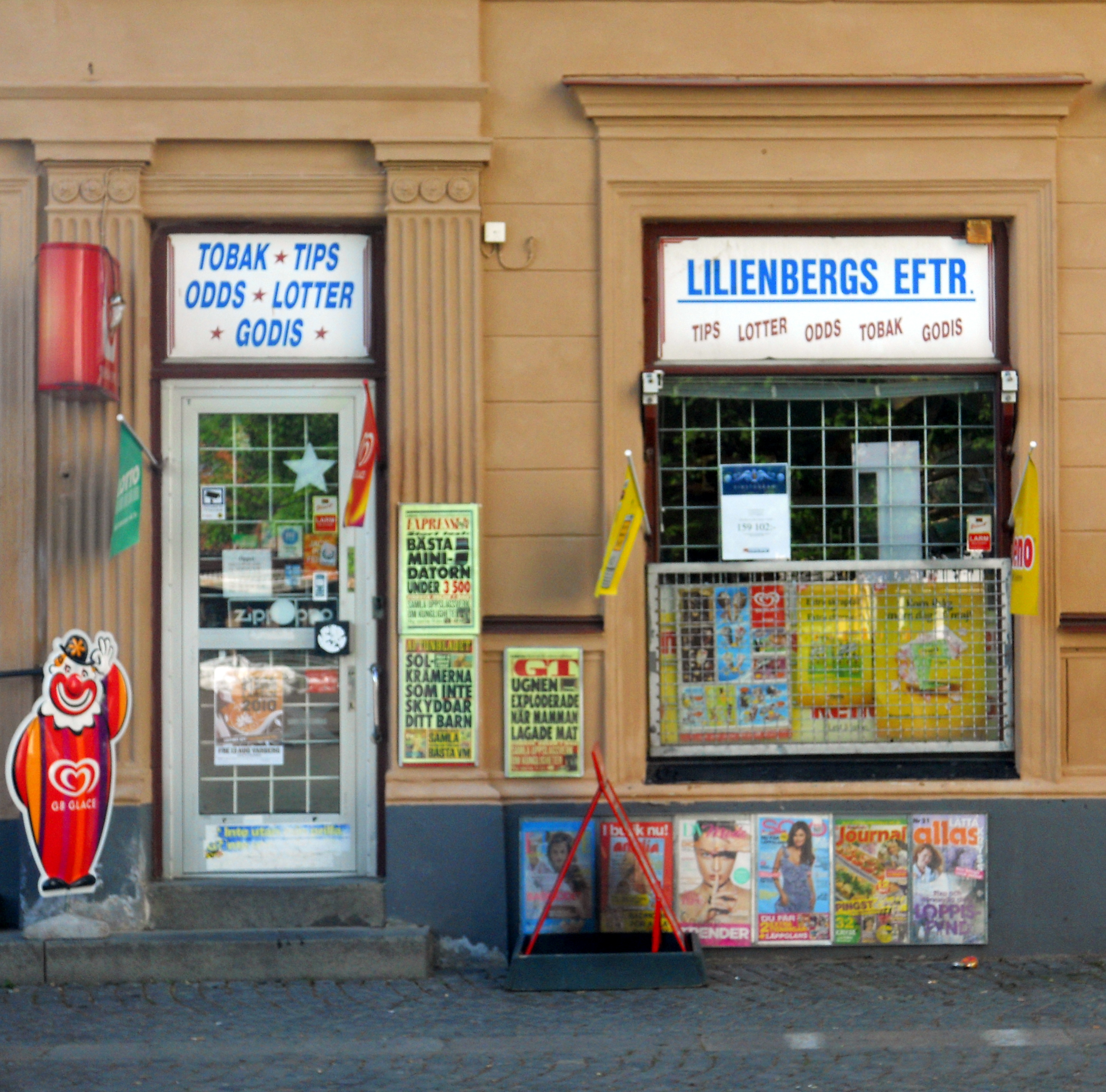
Tobacco shop in Varberg, Sweden

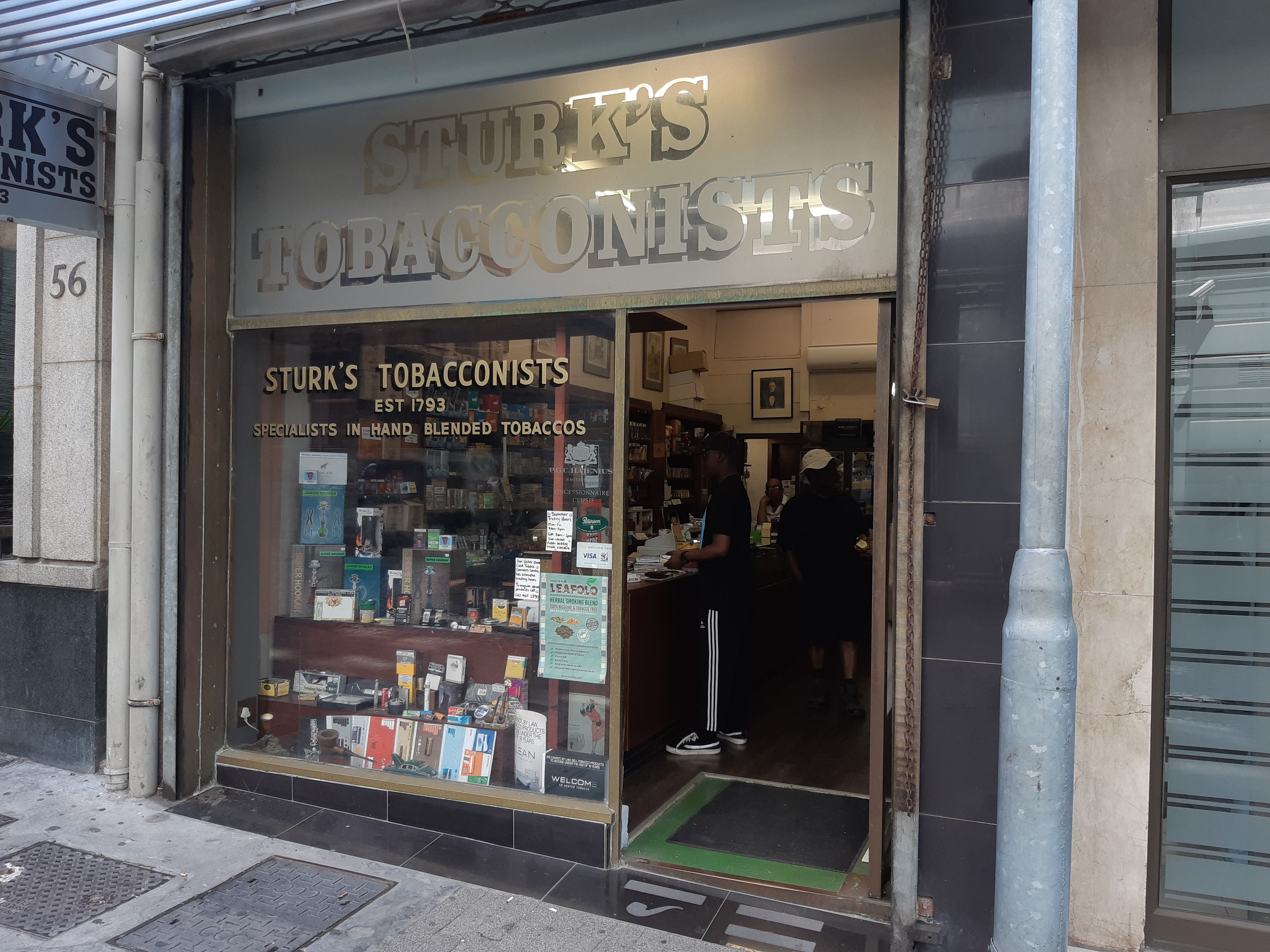
Sturk's Tobacconists in Cape Town, South Africa

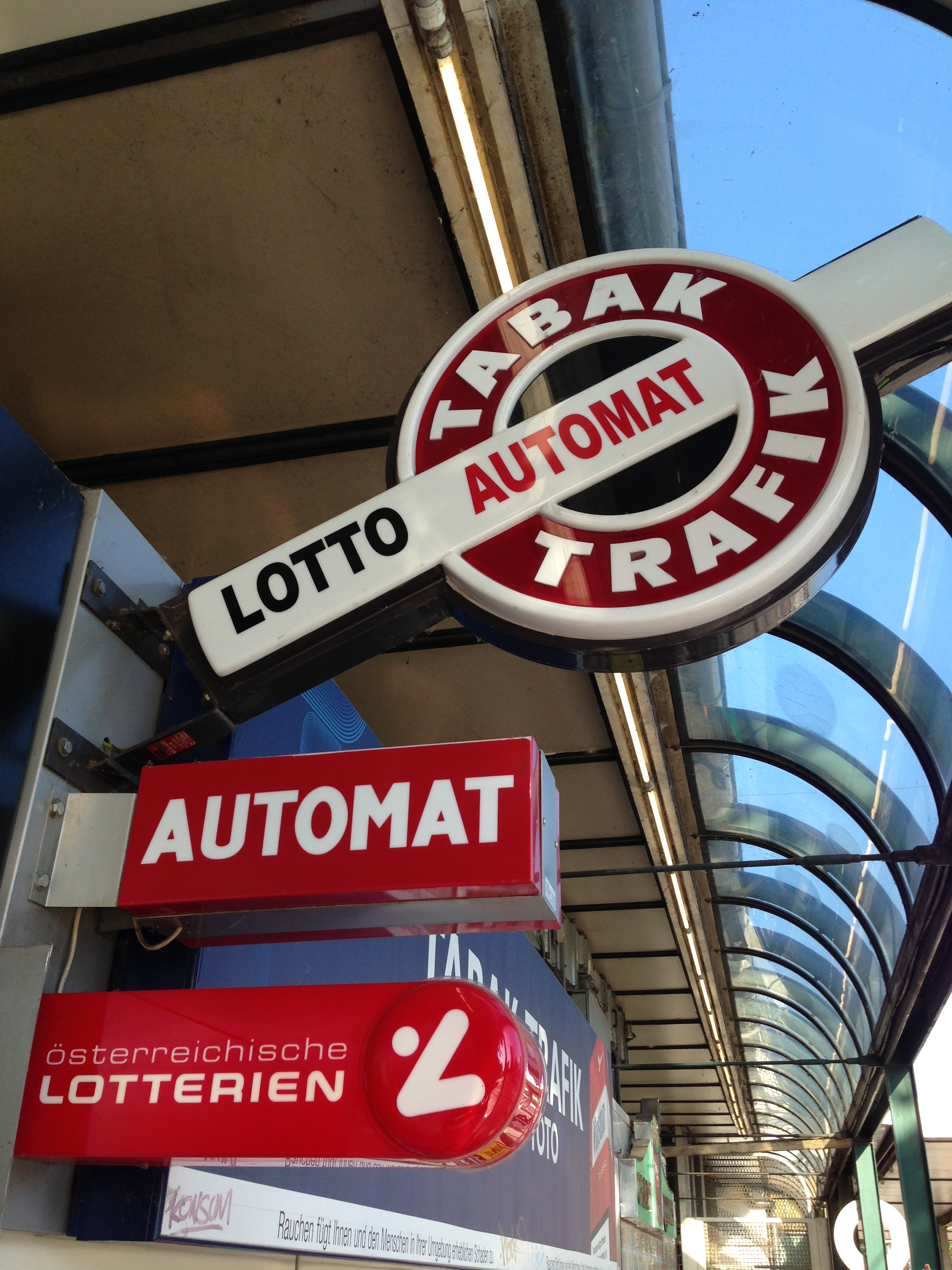
Modern-day tobacco shop sign (Tabaktrafik) in Vienna, Austria.

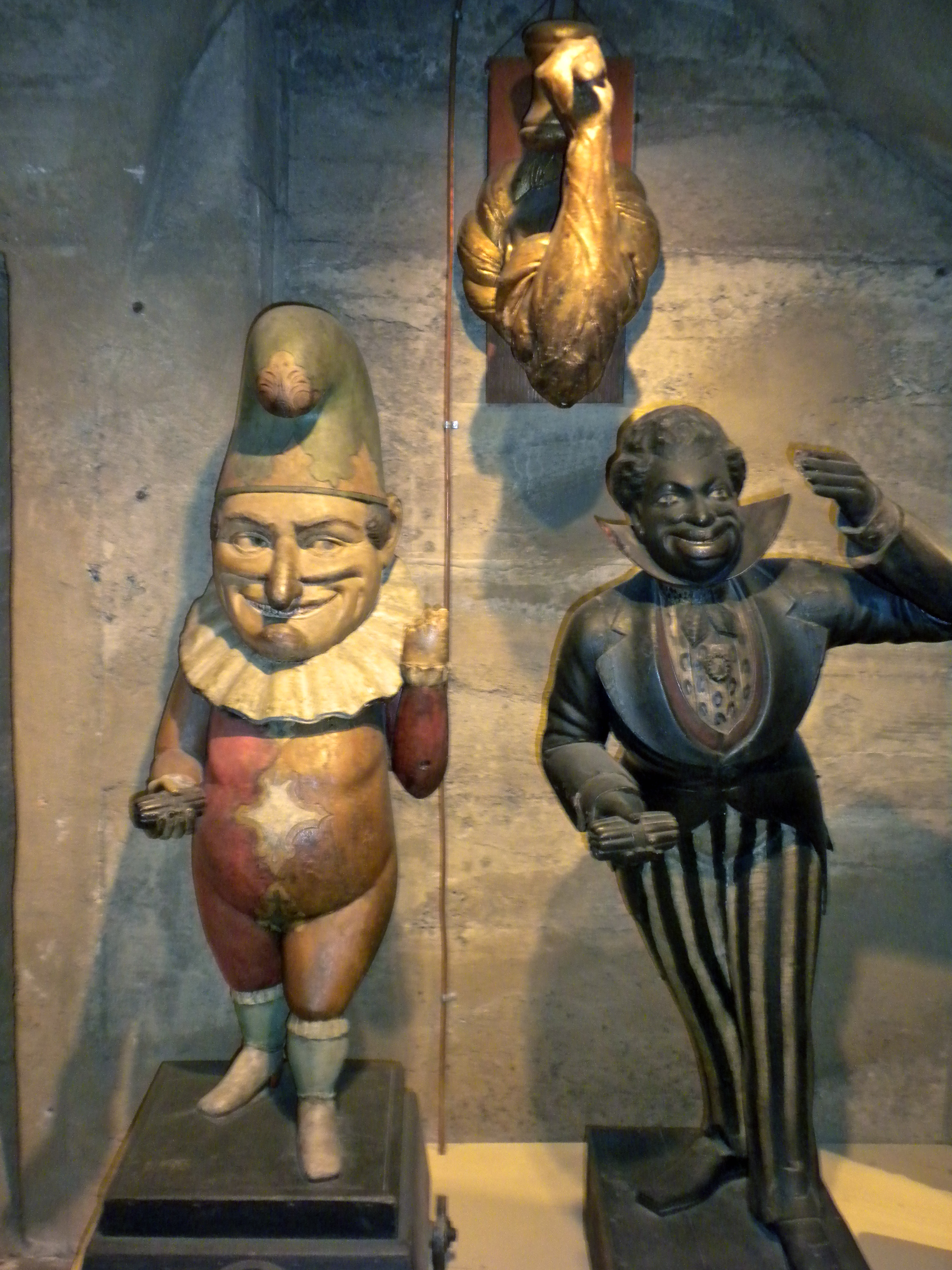
19th century cigar store figures from Mercer Museum in Doylestown, Pennsylvania

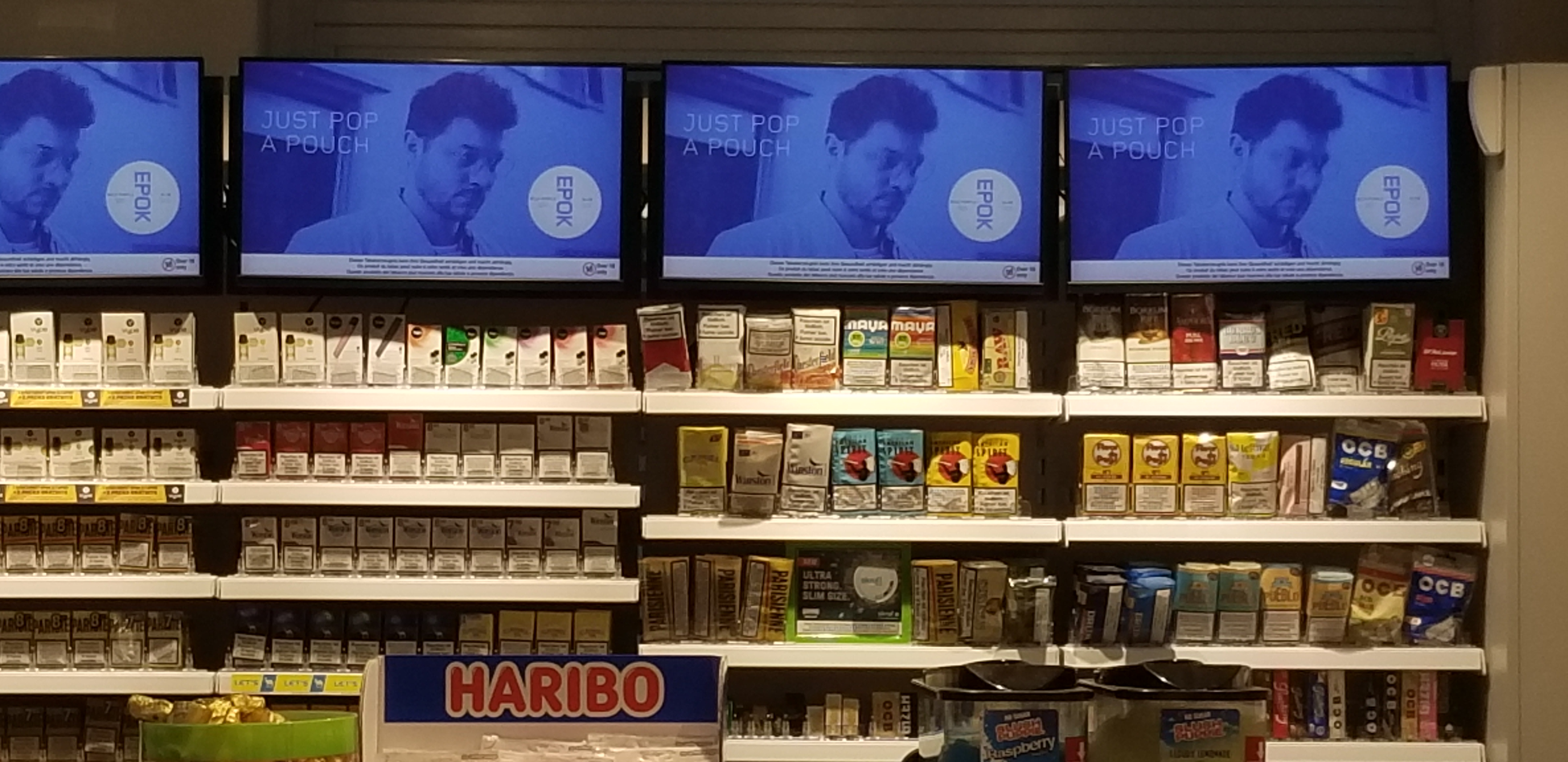
Tobacco shop in Neuchâtel, Switzerland in 2020: advertisement is authorized inside the shop

== See also ==
- Cigar
- Cigarette
- Humidor
- Tobacco pouch
