= Coronationville =

Coronationville Corrie
- Location within Gauteng Location within South Africa
- Coordinates: 26.1925485°S 27.9761531°E
- Country: South Africa
- Province: Gauteng
- Municipality: City of Johannesburg
- Main Place: Johannesburg
- Established: 1937

Government
  - Type: Ward 69
  - Councillor: Genevieve Sherman

Area
  - Total: 0.85 km^{2} (0.33 sq mi)

Population (2011)
  - Total: 4,848
  - Density: 5,700/km^{2} (15,000/sq mi)

Racial makeup (2011)
  - Black African: 60.13%
  - Coloured: 38.08%
  - Indian/Asian: 0.64%
  - White: 0.70%
  - Other: 0.47%

First languages (2011)
  - English: 36.61%
  - Tswana: 30.42%
  - Sotho: 6.42%
  - Afrikaans: 6.19%
  - Other: 20.36%
- Time zone: UTC+2 (SAST)
- Postal code (street): 2093

Coronationville is a suburb of Johannesburg, South Africa. Coronationville is located in Region B of the City of Johannesburg Metropolitan Municipality. Coronationville is located in the West Rand of Johannesburg and during Apartheid, its residents were mainly Coloured.

== History ==
The suburb was founded in 1937 at the time of King George VI with 553 stands on 59ha. The township was named after the coronation of the queen and dedicated it to the ex-servicemen of world war 2. When the coloured soldiers returned they were given this area as a gift for their service in the war. This is how the area became known as Coronationville.

== Education ==
There are a total of three schools in the suburb. The Bernard Isaacs Primary School, Coronationville Secondary School and the St. Theresa's Convent School.
