= Crosby, Gauteng =

Crosby
- Location within Gauteng Location within South Africa
- Coordinates: 26°11′40″S 27°59′21″E
- Country: South Africa
- Province: Gauteng
- Municipality: City of Johannesburg
- Main Place: Johannesburg
- Established: 1938

Government
  - Councillor: Ricky Nair (African National Congress)

Area
  - Total: 1.13 km^{2} (0.44 sq mi)

Population (2011)
  - Total: 6,112
  - Density: 5,410/km^{2} (14,000/sq mi)

Racial makeup (2011)
  - Black African: 20.8%
  - Coloured: 6.2%
  - Indian/Asian: 58.3%
  - White: 12.8%
  - Other: 1.9%

First languages (2011)
  - English: 64.0%
  - Afrikaans: 13.9%
  - Tswana: 3.7%
  - Zulu: 3.0%
  - Other: 15.4%
- Time zone: UTC+2 (SAST)
- Postal code (street): 2092

Crosby is a suburb of Johannesburg, South Africa. The suburb is west of the Johannesburg CBD and is adjacent to Mayfair West. It is located in Region F of the City of Johannesburg Metropolitan Municipality.

== History ==
The suburb was founded in 1938 on 112 hectares (280 acres) of land that was surveyed into 1,163 stands. It is named after Langlaagte Mine director J.H. Crosby.
