= Central Methodist Church, Cape Town =

Central Methodist Church
- Central Methodist Mission
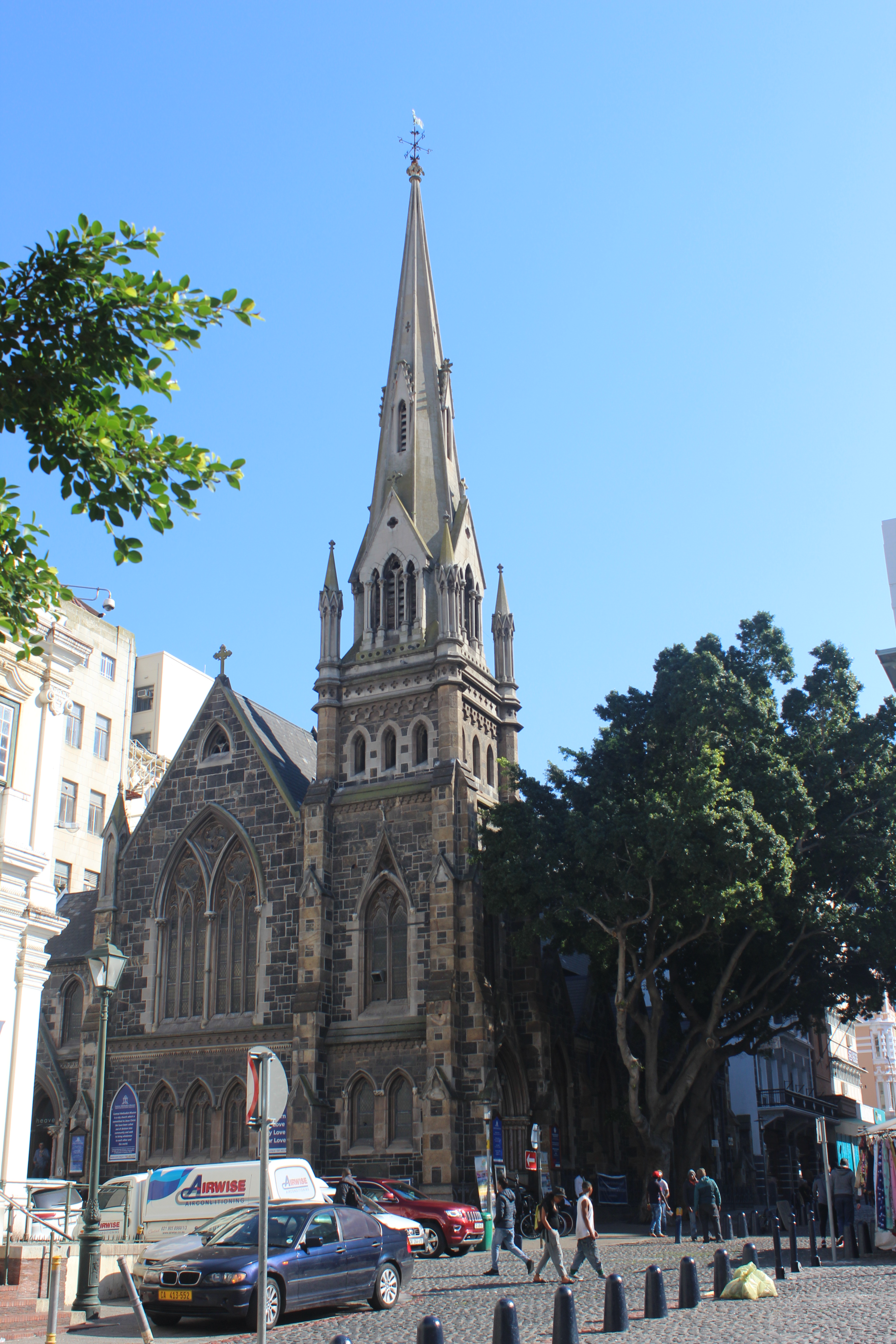
- The church from the north-east
- Central Methodist Church
- 33.9228°S 18.4195°E
- Location: Burg Street, Greenmarket Square, Cape Town
- Country: South Africa
- Denomination: Methodist

History
- Status: Church

Architecture
- Functional status: Active
- Heritage designation: SAHRA identifier: 9/2/018/0125
- Architect: Charles A.S. Freeman
- Style: Decorated Gothic Revival
- Groundbreaking: 1876
- Completed: 12 November 1879
- Construction cost: £17,700 (R5,000,000 in 2018)

The Central Methodist Church, also known as the Central Methodist Mission or Metropolitan Methodist Church, is a large and historically important Methodist church located on Greenmarket Square in Cape Town, South Africa. The church has played a significant role in the growth of Methodism in South Africa. In 1988, the Metropolitan Church merged with Buitenkant Street Church, forming the Central Methodist Mission.

== History and activism ==
The church is known for its active advocacy efforts such as its yellow banner campaign that seeks to rise awareness of important social issues and as a site of refuge. The church windows were damaged by police water cannons during the anti-apartheid Purple Rain protest in 1989. In October 2019 the church was a refuge site for protesting refugees during the Greenmarket Square refugee sit-in.

Yellow banner campaign

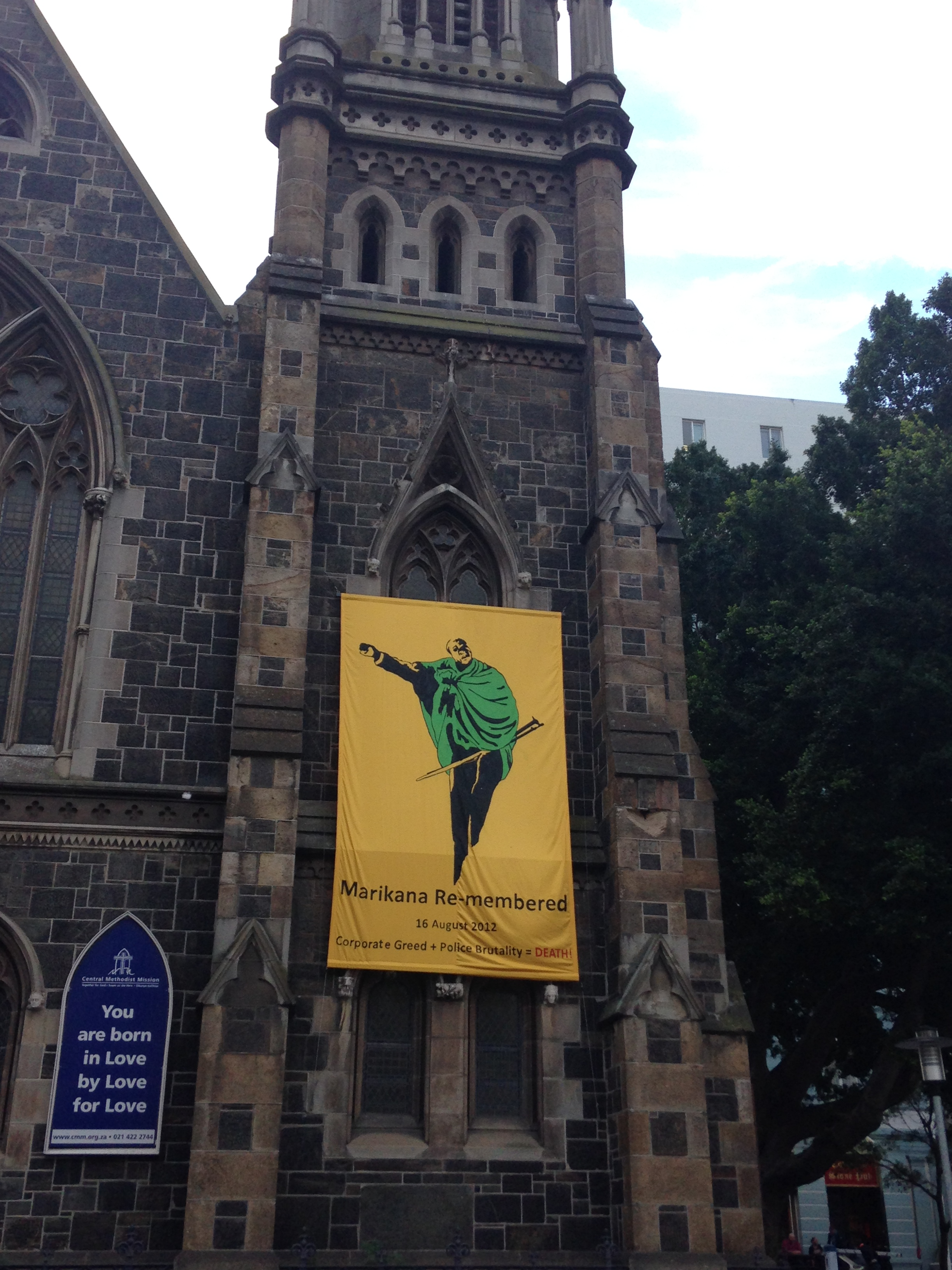
A yellow banner on the church in remembrance of the Marikana massacre.

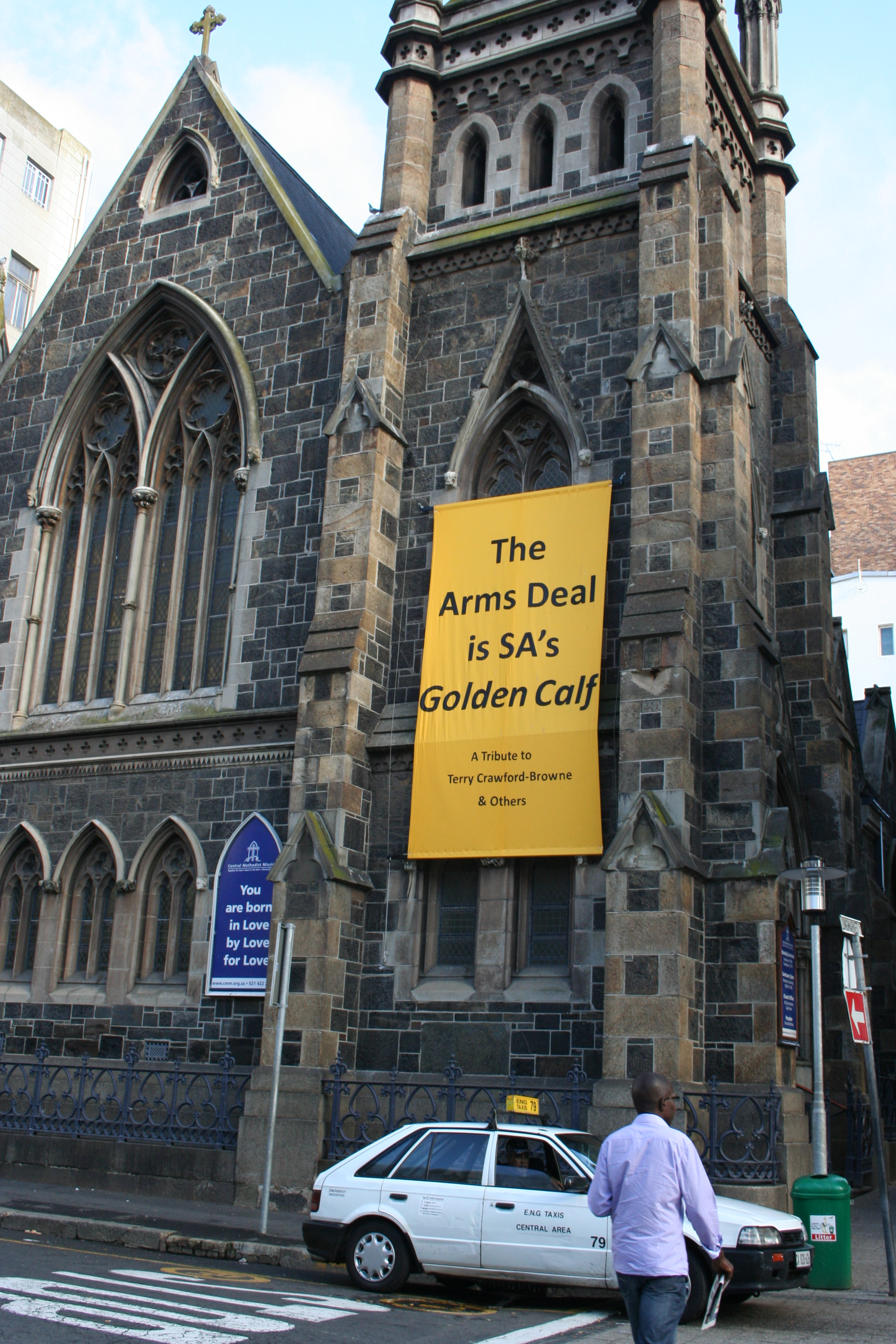
A yellow banner on the church criticizing the South African Arms Deal.

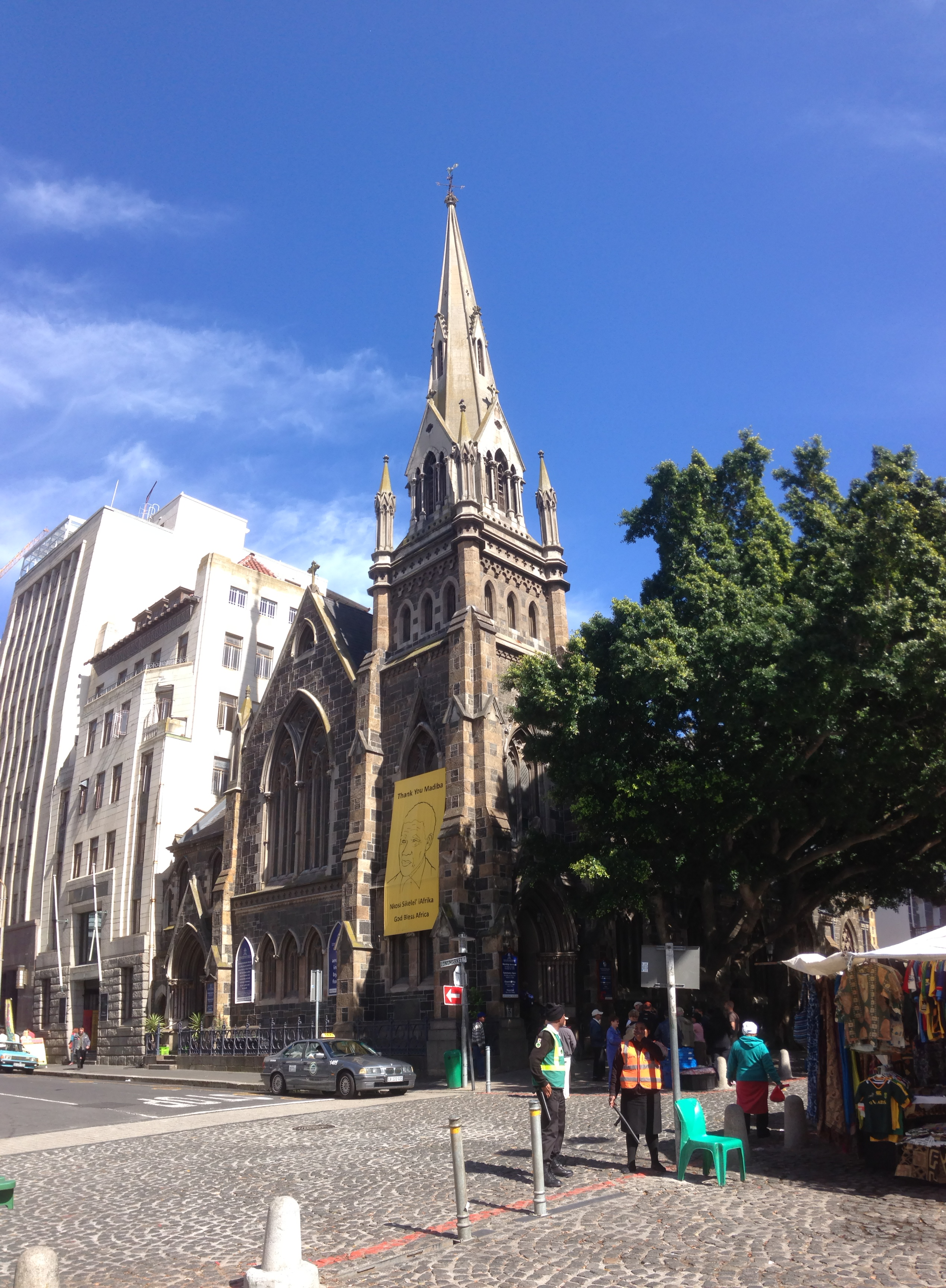
A yellow banner on the church celebrating Nelson Mandela.

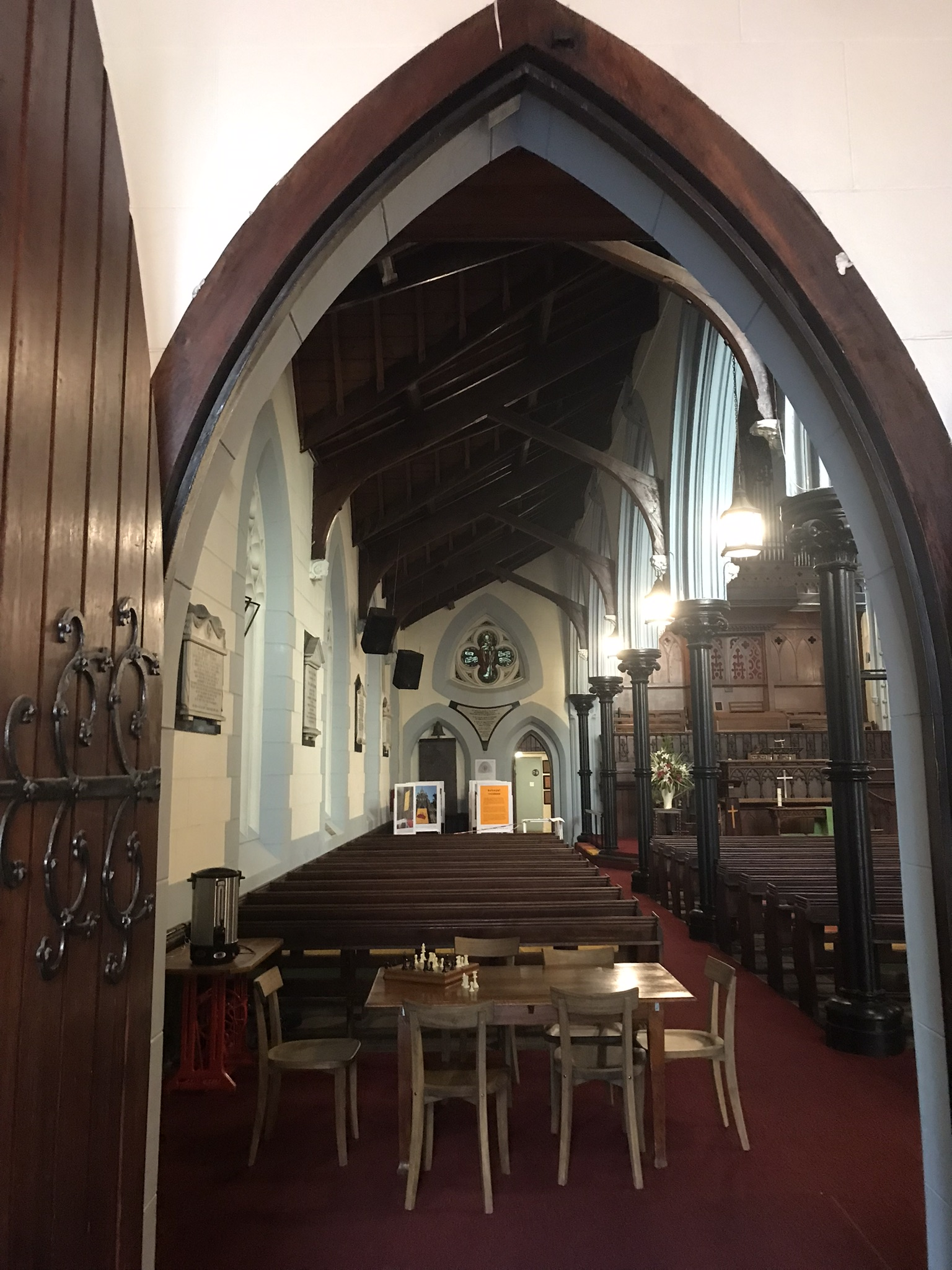
Church entrance with the orange poster, explaining the betrayal and resistance campaign

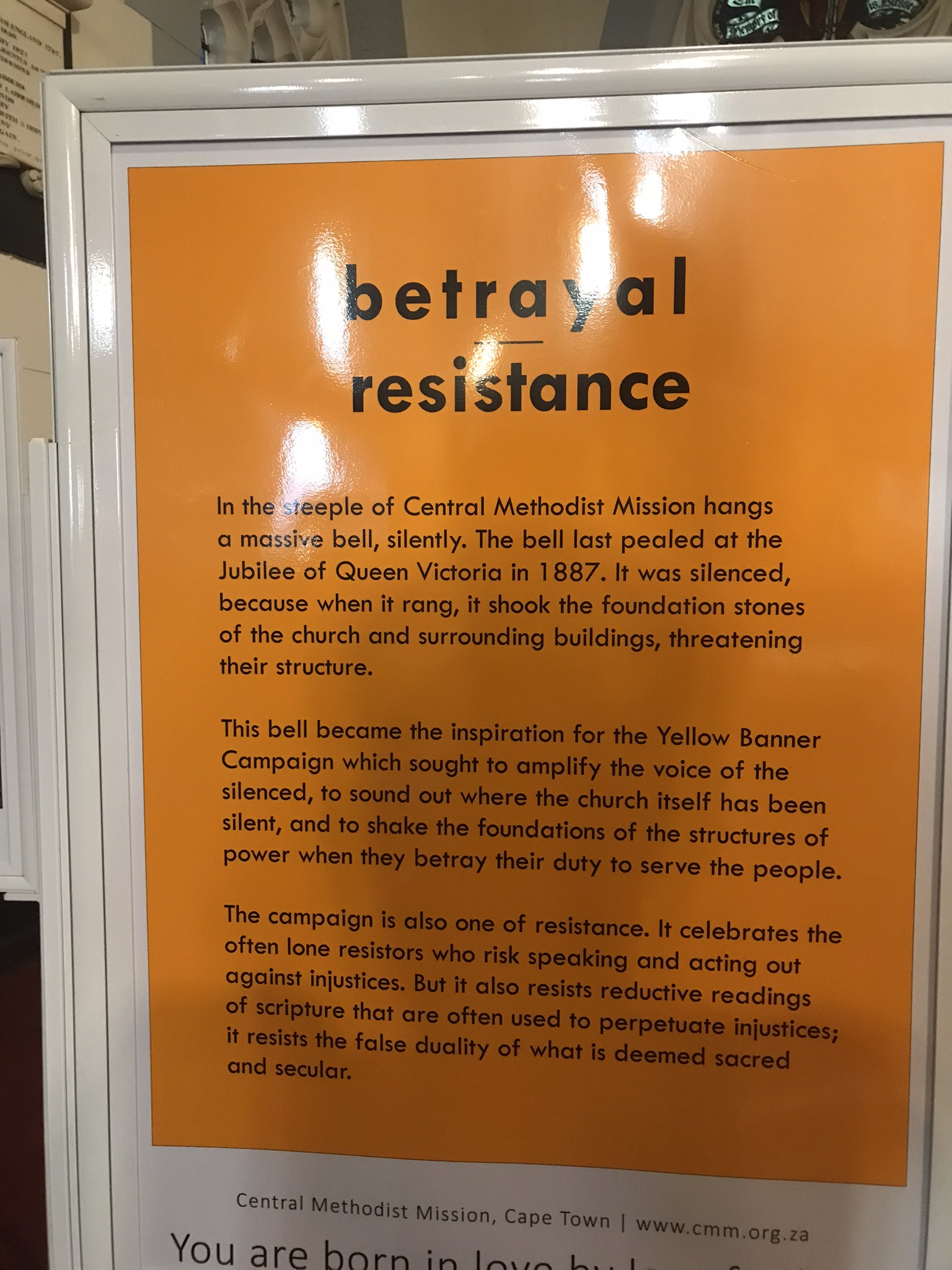
Central Methodist Church betrayal and resistance campaign.

== Architecture ==
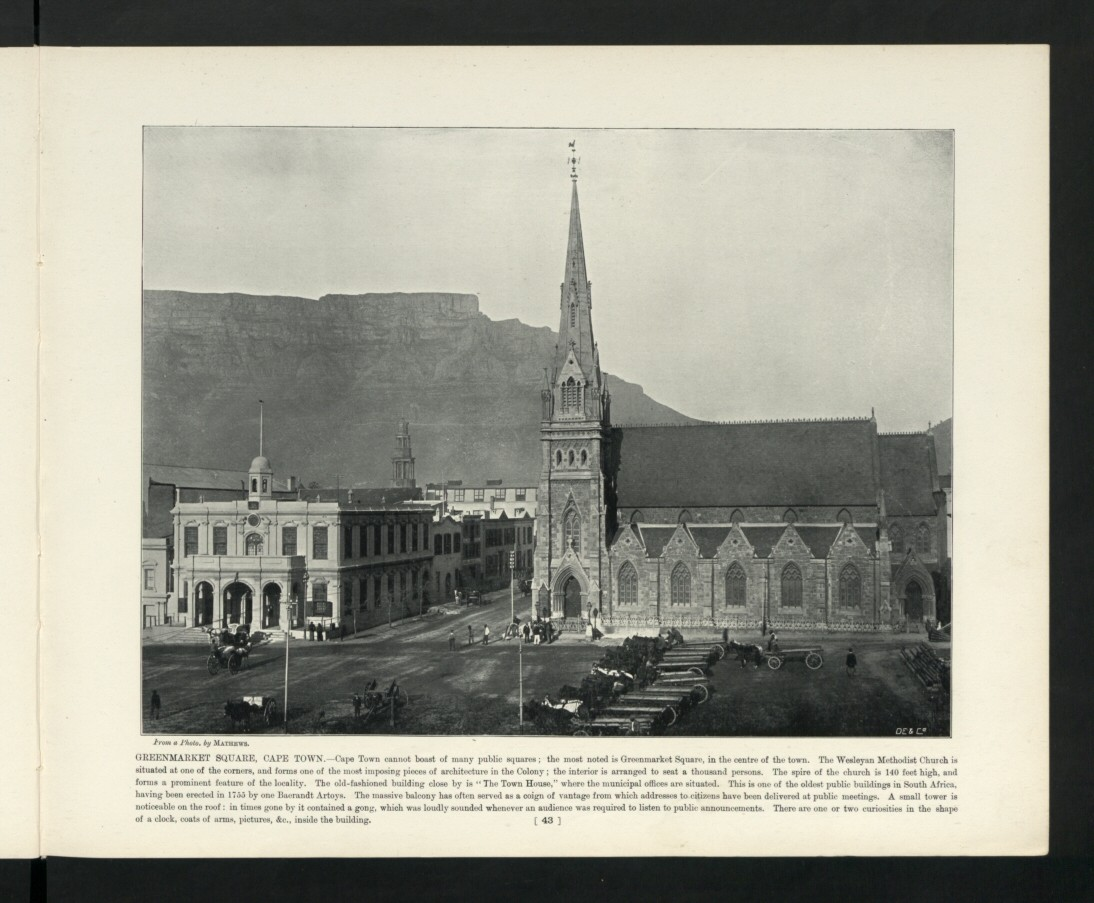
The church at the turn of the 20th century.

The church is the second oldest building on Greenmarket Square after the Old Town House located opposite it. Construction started in 1876 and completed on 12 November 1879 at a cost of £17,700 (equivalent to R5,000,000 in 2018). The architect was Charles Freeman and the building contractor was Thomas Inglesby.

Representing high-Victorian Gothic Revival architecture, the basilica-type church features a distinctive lean-to roof and a tower with a spire. It is a listed heritage building with the SAHRA identifier of 9/2/018/0125.
