= Purple Rain protest =

Anti-apartheid protest

- Cover of "Die Suid-Afrikaan", showing purple rain shower. Afrikaans headline translates to "ELECTION '89"
- Date: 2 September 1989
- Location: Greenmarket Square, Cape Town, South Africa; 33°55′20″S 18°25′14″E
- Methods: anti-apartheid protest

Parties
Mass Democratic Movement	National Party; South African Police

Lead figures
Allan Boesak; Charles Villa-Vicencio; Essa Moosa; Pierre van den Heever	

The Purple Rain Protest, Purple Rain Revolt or Purple Rain Riot was an anti-apartheid protest held in Cape Town on 2 September 1989, four days before South Africa's racially segregated parliament held its elections. A police water cannon with purple dye was turned on thousands of Mass Democratic Movement supporters who poured into the city in an attempt to march on South Africa's Parliament. White office blocks adjacent to Greenmarket Square were sprayed purple four stories high as a protester leapt onto the roof of the water cannon vehicle, seized the nozzle and attempted to turn the jet away from the crowds.

One of the dyed buildings was the Cape Headquarters of the National Party. The historic Town House, a national monument (now known as a provincial heritage site), was sprayed purple and the force of the jet smashed windows in the Central Methodist Church.

Tear gas was fired and the crowd that had knelt defiantly in the purple jet fled. Adderley Street was closed to traffic as scores of shops and businesses closed their doors. More than 500 people were arrested, including Dr Allan Boesak, UCT academic Dr. Charles Villa-Vicencio, Western Cape Council of Churches official Rev. Pierre van den Heever, lawyer Essa Moosa, and 52 journalists.

== Climax ==
The police were using a new water cannon with purple dye whose purpose was to stain protesters for later identification and arrest. Protesters were warned to disperse, but instead knelt in the street. When the cannon was turned on them, some protesters remained kneeling while others fled; some had their feet knocked out from under them by the force of the jet. In Adderley Street, shoppers ran for cover, their eyes streaming, and a young couple with a baby in a pram were hurriedly ushered into a shop which then locked its doors.

A lone protester, Philip Ivey, redirected the water cannon toward the local headquarters of the ruling National Party. The headquarters, along with the historic, white-painted Old Town House, overlooking Greenmarket Square, were doused with purple dye.

A group of about 50 protesters streaming with purple dye ran from Burg Street down to the parade. They were followed by another group of clergymen and others who were stopped in Plein Street. Some were then arrested. On the Parade, a large contingent of policemen arrested everyone they could find who had purple dye on them. When they were booed by the crowd, police dispersed them. About 250 protesters marching under a banner stating "The People Shall Govern" dispersed at the intersection of Darling Street and Sir Lowry Road after being stopped by police.

== Graffiti ==
A piece of anti-apartheid graffiti, "The purple shall govern", appeared on the old Townhouse in Greenmarket Square. The statement is play on words of the Freedom Charter's declaration that "The people shall govern".

The slogan was used as the title of a book, "The Purple shall govern: a South African A to Z of nonviolent action".

== Comments ==
"What about the purple people?" a reader asked the Cape Times' Teleletters. "Not only has the government messed up with the tricameral system, now their police have created another problem. They, the government, have made 'provision' for the so-called coloureds and Indians -- how are they going to accommodate the 'purple people? Perhaps the next time they use their water cannon, they would like to consult with their voters as to which colour is fashionable."

"Who's going to pay for the city's day of purple spray?" asked Don Holliday of the Cape Argus. "As the controversy continues over who is to pay for the clean-up of buildings, streets, cars and clothing sprayed purple by police during Saturday's Mass Democratic Movement's attempted march to parliament, police announced that they would release details of the effects of the dye."

"A spokesperson for the police directorate of public relations said they had approached their forensic science division to prepare a report on the effects of the dye -- including whether it would eventually wash off and possible solutions for washing."

A later statement reported that the dye was a "harmless substance" which was mixed with water and could be washed off clothing with soap and water. Walls sprayed with the dye could be cleaned using a mixture of one part hydrochloric acid to 100 parts water and then rinsed.

The Rev. Herbert Brand of the Dutch Reformed Church was inspired by the "purple drama" as well as the 50th anniversary of the start of WW2 to deliver a passionate sermon on "fascism in the city".

== See also ==
- 1989 in South Africa
- Activism
- Civil disobedience
