= 1965 in South African sport =

- Years in South African sport: 1962 1963 1964 1965 1966 1967 1968
- Centuries: 19th century · 20th century · 21st century
- Decades: 1930s 1940s 1950s 1960s 1970s 1980s 1990s
- Years: 1962 1963 1964 1965 1966 1967 1968

This article is an incomplete list of sporting events relevant to South Africa in 1965.

== Rugby union ==
- 10 April - The South Africa (Springboks) loses to Ireland 6-9 at Lansdowne Road, Dublin, Ireland

== Golf ==
- Sewsunker "Papwa" Sewgolum, an Indian golfer, beats Gary Player to win the Natal Open tournament for the second time
- Gary Player completed golf's Grand Slam when he won the US Open title. He was the first non-American in 45 years to win this prestigious title and he was the first man outside Britain or America to ever win the US Open. And together with Harold Henning he won the Canada Cup (later to become the World Cup) for South Africa. He won the individual title.

== Cricket ==
South African cricket team toured the United Kingdom, being captained by Peter van der Merwe with J.B. Plimsoll the manager. The rest of the team- A.Bacher, E.J. Barlow, K.C. Bland, J.T. Botten, H.D. Bromfield, N.S. Crookes, R. Dumbrill, D. Gamsy, H.R. Lance, D.T. Lindsay, M.J. Macaulay, A.H. McKinnon, P. Pollock, R.G. Pollock. M. McLennan, baggage-master & scorer.

South Africa played three tests matches, winning one, drawing two. Thus winning the series.

1st Test -Lord's.22–27 July 1965.match drawn. This was the 100th test match played between England and South Africa. The first test between the two countries was played in Port Elizabeth, 12/13 March 1889 during England's 1888/89 tour.

2nd Test-Trent Bridge.5–9 August 1965. South Africa won. In South Africa's 1st innings Graeme Pollock scored 125 runs off 145 balls in 139 minutes. Elder brother Peter Pollock, fast bowler, had match figures of 10 wickets and conceding 87 runs.

3rd Test-The Oval.26–31 August 1965. Match drawn.

The team played 18 first-class games, winning 5 and 11 were drawn.

== Tennis ==
Davis Cup Europe Zone. South African team-Cliff Drysdale, Keith Diepraam, Rob Maud, Frew McMillan. 1st round, beat Netherlands. 2nd round, beat Norway. Quarter-final, beat Great Britain. Semi-final, beat France. Final, lost to Spain 1-4.

== Hockey-Ladies ==
South African Ladies Hockey team became the first overseas team to beat England at Wembley, England, beating them 3-1 before a crowd of 57,000. The half time score was 2-1. South African goal scorers : Denise Hellman (2) & Enid Spence. England : Ellen Toulson. 13 March 1965.

The South African team: Thelma Martin; Mrs Audrey Laidlaw (captain), Mrs Ursula Fairbairn; Mrs Angela Harrison, Mrs Rina van Zyl, Valerie Thompson; Mrs Rita Hoon, Enid Spence, Mrs Loretta Maree, Mrs Denise Hellman & Mrs Jean Loudon.
