= 1983 in South Africa =

- Decades: 1960s; 1970s; 1980s; 1990s; 2000s
- See also: 1983 in South African sport; List of years in South Africa

The following lists events that happened during 1983 in South Africa.

== Incumbents ==
- State President: Marais Viljoen.
- Prime Minister: P.W. Botha.
- Chief Justice: Pieter Jacobus Rabie.

== Events ==
January

- 26 – One person is killed and five injured by a bomb that explodes at the New Brighton Community Council offices.
- 30 – A bomb explodes at the Pietermaritzburg Supreme Court.
- Dieter Gerhardt is arrested by the FBI in New York.

February

- 7 – Cedric Mayson, is charged with treason. He The case was to resume on 18 April but he flees to Britain while on bail.
- 10 – Umkhonto we Sizwe saboteurs burn 5 square kilometres of land in the Richards Bay area in an arson attack.
- 11 – The Drakensberg Administration Board offices are damaged by a bomb.
- 12 – A bomb injures 76 people at the Free State Administration Board offices.
- 20 – Umkhonto we Sizwe saboteurs try to set the Pelindaba Nuclear Research Station on fire in an arson attack.

March

- 12 – A bomb explodes on a railway coach on a Johannesburg-bound passenger train.
- 21 – A second bomb explodes at the Supreme Court in Pietermaritzburg.

April

- 21 – A third bomb explodes at the Supreme Court in Pietermaritzburg.
- 30 – Prime Minister P.W. Botha meets with Lesotho's Minister of Foreign Affairs about the Lesotho Highlands Water Project.

May

- 13 – An improvised explosive device, 37 kg of explosives in a gas cylinder, is found under a bridge on the Southern Freeway in Durban and defused by police.
- 20 – An Umkhonto we Sizwe car bomb, planted by Abubakar Ismael, explodes outside the South African Air Force Headquarters during the afternoon rush hour period, opposite a building housing military intelligence personnel in Pretoria. 19 people are killed and 220 injured.
- 23 – The South African Air Force retaliates by attacking African National Congress facilities in the suburb of Matola in Maputo, Mozambique during Operation Skerwe.
- Two explosions cause R250,000 worth of damage to the Offices of the Department of Internal Affairs in Roodepoort.
- A skirmish on the Botswana border leaves four insurgents and a South African Army soldier dead.

June

- 17 – Police defuse a bomb found on a power pylon at New Canada railway station in Soweto.
- 28 – A bomb explodes at the Department of Internal Affairs in Roodepoort.

July

- 7 – Two bombs are found and defused at the Durban Supreme Court while two bombs detonate in Roodepoort at 00:40, causing structural damage to the Department of Internal Affairs offices and the Police Station.

August

- 6 – A bomb explodes at Temple Israel in Hillbrow just before Marais Steyn is due to speak there. There are no injuries.
- 20 – A bomb causes R100,000 in damage to a sub-station near Mamelodi.
- 20 – The United Democratic Front is launched.
- 26 – A Limpet mine explodes at the Ciskei Consul General's offices in the Carlton Centre, Johannesburg, injuring one.

September

- 8 – Two bombs damage sub-stations in Johannesburg, in Randburg and Sandton.
- 11 – More sub-stations are damaged by Limpet mines in Johannesburg, in Bryanston North and Fairlands.
- 12 – Ciskei offices in Pretoria are damaged by a Limpet mine.
- 13 – A bomb explodes at 19h45 in the Rowntree's factory in Umbilo, Durban.
- 29 – The Police defuse a bomb on an electrical pylon in Vereeniging.

October

- 11 – Limpet mines explode at 02:20 and damage a large fuel storage tank, three rail tankers and one road tanker at Warmbad. Two more devices, set to explode 1 hour later, are found on the door of the Civil Defence office. P.W. Botha was due to speak in Warmbad.
- 14 – Two electricity pylons near Pietermaritzburg are destroyed by Limpet mines at 02:00 and 03:00.

November

- 1 – Buses at a municipal bus depot in Durban are damaged by a bomb that explodes at midnight, the railway line at Germiston is damaged by a bomb, Police defuse a bomb on the railway line near Springs.
- 1 – The South African Defence Force launches Operation Askari.
- 2 – A white referendum on a new Constitution to provide for a White, Coloured and Indian Tricameral Parliament yields a 66% yes vote.
- 2 – A bomb explodes at 02:55 at the Police workshop in Wentworth, Durban and damages vehicles and the adjacent Alan Taylor student residence.
- 3 – The Bosmont railway station is damaged by a bomb, the Bosmont-Newclare railway line is damaged in an explosion, the railway line near Germiston is damaged by an explosion, Police defuse explosives on the railway line near Springs and electrical pylons are damaged by two explosions near Durban.

December

- 3 or 7 – A bomb explodes at the office of the Department of Community Development in Bree Street, Johannesburg.
- 8 – The railway line 1 km from Bloemfontein is maliciously damaged and a locomotive and two trucks are derailed.
- 12 – Seven people are injured when a Limpet mine explodes at the offices of the Department of Community Development and Commissioners Court in Johannesburg.
- 15 – Three bombs explode on the beach front outside the Natal Command HQ in Durban.
- 19 – A bomb causes R60,000 worth of damage to the KwaMashu township offices in Durban.
- 29 – Dieter Gerhardt is sentenced to life imprisonment for treason.

== Births ==
- 4 January – Derick Hougaard, rugby player
- 18 January – Caroline Wöstmann, long-distance runner
- 9 February – Ryan McLaren, cricketer
- 11 February – Thando Mngomeni, soccer player
- 4 March – Jaque Fourie, rugby player
- 4 March – Michelle Butler-Emmett, badminton player
- 23 March – Morgan Gould, football player
- 31 March – Hashim Amla, cricketer
- 13 April – Schalk Burger, rugby player, 2004 World Rugby Player of the Year
- 16 April – Angelique Gerber, actress
- 20 April – Greg Smith, cricketer
- 22 April – Claudia Henkel, Miss South Africa 2004
- 16 May – Loyiso Gola, stand-up comedian and actor
- 18 May – Warren Masemola, actor
- 11 June – Wynand Olivier, rugby player
- 12 June – Bryan Habana, rugby player, 2007 World Rugby Player of the Year
- 20 June – Portia Modise, soccer player, 2006 Women's African Football Championship player of the tournament
- 27 June – Dale Steyn, cricketer
- 11 July – Elrio van Heerden, football player
- 14 July – Bridgitte Hartley, Olympics bronze medalist
- 19 July – Howza, rapper, songwriter and actor
- 27 July – Okmalumkoolkat, rapper
- 4 August – Adhir Kalyan, actor
- 8 August – Chris Dednam, badminton player
- 8 September – Zenzo Ngqobe, actor known for portraying Butcher in Gavin Hood's 2005 Academy Award for Best Foreign Language Film Tsotsi
- 19 August – Reeva Steenkamp, model (d. 2013)
- 23 August – Wayne Sandilands, footballer
- 24 September – Lyndon Ferns, swimmer
- 6 October – Sunette Viljoen, Olympics silver medal winning javelin thrower & South Africa women's national cricket team player
- 19 October – Mmabatho Montsho, fashion designer, writer, actress and film director
- 31 October – Bevan Fransman, football player
- 5 November – Tanya Seymour, dressage rider
- 21 November – Ronald Lamola, politician, Minister of Justice and Correctional Services
- 6 December – Euphonik, DJ and radio personality
- 9 December – Dina Lebo Phalula long-distance runner
- 13 December – Tanya van Graan, singer, actress, model
- 14 December – Tatum Keshwar, Miss South Africa 2008
- 16 December – Dineo Ranaka, TV personality, radio DJ and actress
- 30 December – DJ Zinhle, DJ and producer.

== Deaths ==
- 16 June – James Calata, African National Congress leader and Anglican clergyman. (b. 1895)
- 10 September – John Vorster, former Prime Minister and State President. (b. 1915)
- 19 September – Yusuf Dadoo, doctor and activist. (b. 1909)
- 13 December – Mary Renault, writer. (b. 1905)

== Railways ==
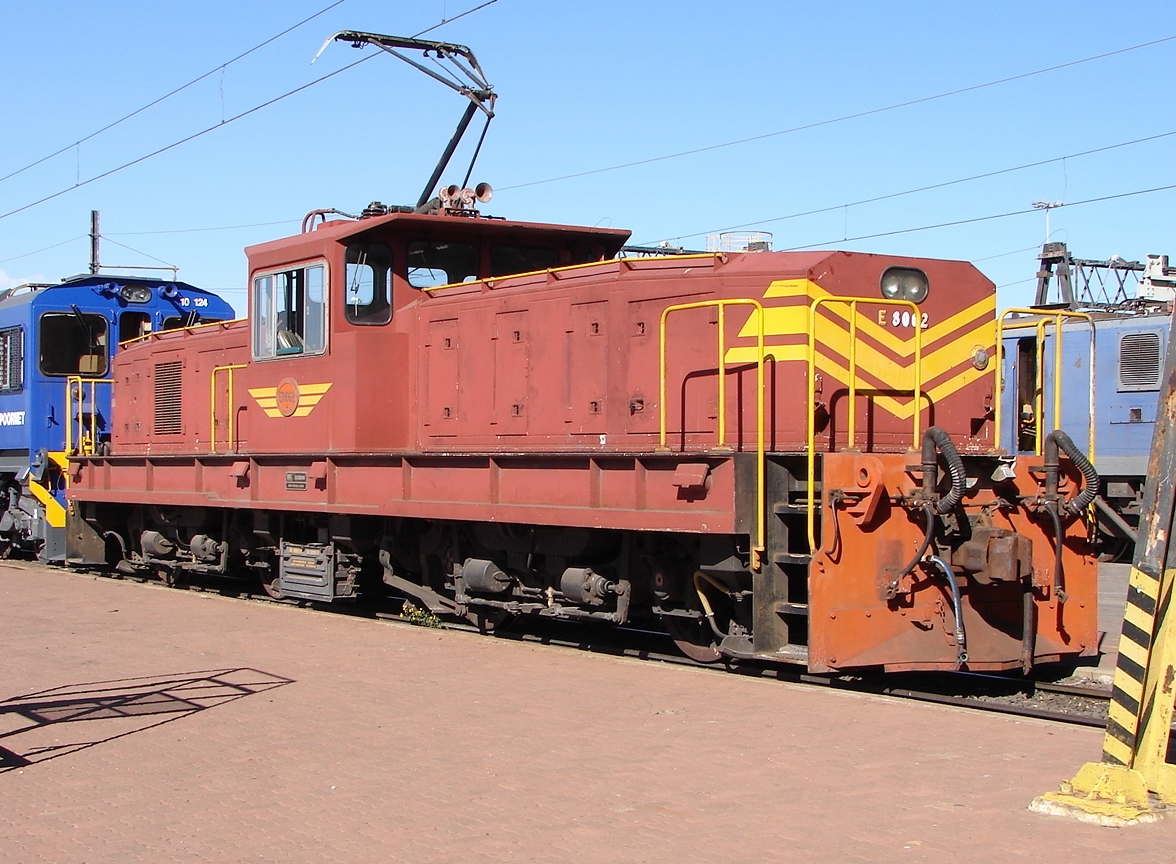
Class 8E

=== Locomotives ===
Four new Cape gauge locomotive types enter service on the South African Railways:

- Forty 25 kV AC Class 7E2, Series 2 electric locomotives.
- The first of sixty 25 kV AC Class 7E3, Series 1 Hitachi electric locomotives.
- The first of one hundred Class 8E centre-cab electric shunting locomotives. Seven more are built for the mining industry.
- Five Class 12E electric locomotives dedicated to the planned MetroBlitz high speed interurban service between Johannesburg and Pretoria.

== Sports ==
=== Athletics ===
- 30 April – Kevin Flanegan wins his first national title in the men's marathon, clocking 2:16:21 in Durban.
