= 1997 in South African sport =

This is a list of events in South African Sport in 1977.

== Football (Soccer) ==
=== January ===
- 11 January - South Africa (Bafana Bafana) draws with Zambia 0-0 at the Independence Stadium, Lusaka, Zambia in the World Cup qualifiers

=== April ===
- 6 April - Bafana Bafana loses to Congo 0-2 at the Municipal Stadium, Pointe Noire, Congo in the World Cup qualifiers
- 27 April - Bafana Bafana beats Zaire 2-1 at the Municipal Stadium, Lomé, Togo in the World Cup qualifiers

=== May ===
- 24 May - Bafana Bafana loses to England 1-2 at the Old Trafford, Manchester, England in a friendly match

=== June ===
- 4 June - Bafana Bafana loses to the Netherlands 0-2 in the Nelson Mandela Challenge held in the FNB Stadium, Johannesburg
- 8 June - Bafana Bafana beats Zambia 3-0 at Soccer City, Johannesburg in the World Cup qualifiers

=== August ===
- 16 August - Bafana Bafana beats Congo 1-0 at Soccer City, Johannesburg in the World Cup qualifiers

=== October ===
- 11 October - Bafana Bafana loses to France 1-2 at Felix Bollaert Stadium, Lens, France in a friendly match

=== November ===
- 15 November - Bafana Bafana loses to Germany 3-0 at Rheinstadion, Düsseldorf, Germany in a friendly match

=== December ===
- 7 December - Bafana Bafana loses to Brazil 1-2 at Ellis Park Stadium, Johannesburg in a friendly match
- 13 December - Bafana Bafana team draws with the Czech Republic 2-2 at King Fahd Stadium, Riyadh, Saudi Arabia in the Confederations Cup
- 15 December - Bafana Bafana loses to the United Arab Emirates 0-1 at King Fahd Stadium, Riyadh, Saudi Arabia in the Confederations Cup
- 17 December - Bafana Bafana loses to Uruguay 3-4 at King Fahd Stadium, Riyadh, Saudi Arabia in the Confederations Cup

== See also ==
- 1996 in South African sport
- 1997 in South Africa
- 1998 in South African sport
- List of years in South African sport
