= 2003 in South African sport =

This is a list of events in South African sport in 2005.

== Athletics ==
- 23–31 August - South Africa wins 4 medals at the 2003 World Championships in Athletics held at the Stade de France in Saint Denis, Paris, France: Jacques Freitag and Hestrie Cloete - golds in the High jump; Okkert Brits - silver in the Pole vault and Mbulaeni Mulaudzi - bronze in the 800 m
- 13–14 September - Hestrie Cloete (High jump) and Okkert Brits (pole vault) win a gold and silver respectively at the 1st IAAF World Athletics Final held at the Stade Louis II, in Monte Carlo, Monaco

== Football (Soccer) ==
- 11 October - South Africa (Bafana Bafana) beats Costa Rica 2–1 in the Nelson Mandela Challenge held in Potchefstroom

== See also ==
- 2002 in South African sport
- 2003 in South Africa
- 2004 in South African sport
- List of years in South African sport
