= 2000 in South African sport =

This is a list of events in South African sport in 2000.

== Boxing ==
- 14 May - Mike Bernardo defeats Dan Jerlingh of the Czech Republic with a 5th-round technical knockout in Hungary and wins the World Boxing Federation heavyweight title

== Football (Rugby Union) ==
- 19 November - The South Africa (Springboks) beat Ireland 28–18 at Lansdowne Road, Dublin, Ireland

== Football (Soccer) ==
- 7 October - South Africa (Bafana Bafana) draws with France 0–0 in the Nelson Mandela Challenge held in Ellis Park Stadium, Johannesburg

== See also ==
- 1999 in South African sport
- 2000 in South Africa
- 2001 in South African sport
- List of years in South African sport
