= 1983 in South African sport =

== Boxing ==
- 23 September - Gerrie Coetzee, the South African heavyweight boxing champion, wins the World Boxing Association (WBA) title in Richfield, Ohio, by knocking out American Michael Dokes and becomes the first South African boxer to win a world heavyweight title. (See: Michael Dokes vs. Gerrie Coetzee )

== Motorsport ==
- 15 October - The South African Grand Prix, is held at Kyalami.

== See also ==
- 1983 in South Africa
- 1994 in South African sport
- Timeline of South African sport
