= 2005 in South African sport =

This is a list of events in South African sport in 2005.

== Cricket ==
=== November ===
- 16 November - The Proteas beats India by 5 wickets at the Rajiv Gandhi International Stadium, Uppal, Hyderabad, India in South Africa and India's 1st One Day International of the 2005/6 season.
- 19 November - The Proteas lose to India by 6 wickets in the 2nd One Day International (day/night game) held in M.Chinnaswamy Stadium, Bangalore, India.
- 22 November - The 3rd One-Day International in Chennai between the Proteas and the Indian cricket team is abandoned
- 25 November - The Proteas beat India by 10 wickets in Kolkata their 4th One-Day International

=== December ===
- 30 December - The Proteas lose to Australia by 184 runs in the 2nd test held at the Melbourne Cricket Ground

== Football (Rugby Union) ==
=== April ===
- 30 April - The South African national women's rugby team (Springbok Women's team) beat Wales 24 - 9 in Cardiff, Wales

=== May ===
- 30 April - The South African national women's rugby team (Springbok Women's team) lose to England 0 - 101 in Twickenham, England

=== June ===
- 11 June - South Africa (Springboks) set a massive record-breaking victory against the Uruguay 134–3 in East London
- 18 June - The Springboks drew 30–30 with France (les Tricolores) in Durban
- 25 June - The Springboks clinches the series 2–0 by beating les Tricolores 27–13 in Port Elizabeth

=== July ===
- 9 July - The Springboks lose against Australia (Wallabies) 30–12 in the first match of the Mandela Challenge held in Sydney
- 23 July - The Springboks beat the Wallabies 33–20 to retain the Mandela Challenge Plate in the second leg test in Johannesburg
- 30 July - The Springboks beat the Wallabies 22–16 in the first Tri Nations Series match in Pretoria

=== August ===
- 6 August - The Springboks beat New Zealand (All Blacks) 22–16 in the Tri Nations Series match at Newlands Cape Town
- 20 August - The Springboks beat the Wallabies 22–19 in the Tri Nations Series match at Perth, Australia
- 27 August - The Springboks lose to the All Blacks 27–31 in the Tri Nations Series match at Carisbrook, Dunedin, New Zealand

=== November ===
- 5 November - The Springboks beat Argentina (los Pumas) 34–23 in Buenos Aires
- 19 November - The Springboks beat the Wales (The Dragons) 33–16 in Cardiff

== Football (Soccer) ==
=== February ===
- 9 February - Bafana Bafana draws 1–1 to Australia in a friendly match
- 26 February - Bafana Bafana beats Seychelles 3–0 in the opening round of the COSAFA Cup in Mauritius
- 27 February - Bafana Bafana beats Mauritius 1–0 in the COSAFA Cup in Mauritius

=== March ===
- 26 March - Bafana Bafana beats Uganda 2–1 in the World Cup qualifiers

=== June ===
- 4 June - Bafana Bafana beats the Cape Verde Islands 2–1 in the 2006 World Cup qualifiers
- 18 June - Bafana Bafana lose 0–2 to Ghana in the 2006 World Cup qualifiers at the FNB Stadium in Johannesburg

=== July ===
- 7 July - Bafana Bafana beats Mexico 2-1 during the 2005 CONCACAF Gold Cup in the Carson, California
- 10 July - Bafana Bafana draws 3–3 with Jamaica during the 2005 CONCACAF Gold Cup in Los Angeles, California
- 13 July - Bafana Bafana draws 1–1 with Guatemala during the 2005 CONCACAF Gold Cup
- 17 July - Bafana Bafana drew 1–1 with Panama in Houston, Texas but loses due to 3-5 penalties and is out of the running in the 2005 CONCACAF Gold Cup

=== August ===
- 13 August - Bafana Bafana loses 8–9 in a shootout to Zambia kicking them out of the COSAFA Cup
- 17 August - Bafana Bafana loses 1–4 in a friendly match against Iceland

=== September ===
- 3 September - Bafana Bafana loses to Burkina Faso 3–1 in the 2006 World Cup qualifiers
- 7 September - Bafana Bafana loses to Germany 4–2 in a friendly match

=== October ===
- 8 October - Bafana Bafana draws with Democratic Republic of Congo (The Simbas) 2–2 in the 2006 World Cup qualifiers

=== November ===
- 12 November - Bafana Bafana loses 2–3 in the Nelson Mandela Challenge against Senegal held in Port Elizabeth

== Golf ==
- 2 May - Ernie Els wins the Asian Open held in Shanghai.
- 4–7 August - Retief Goosen wins The International (a PGA Tour golf tournament) held at the Castle Pines Golf Course, Castle Rock, Colorado
- 25–27 November - Vincent Tshabalala and Tim Clark wins the Nelson Mandela Invitational held at Arabella Country Estate near Hermanus
- 18 December - Retief Goosen wins the South African Airways Open

== Motorsport ==
- 25 September - A1 Team South Africa finishes 24th (last) in the sprint race and 6th in the main race of the British A1 Grand Prix of Nations held at the Brands Hatch, placing them 8th at the start of the 2005–06 A1 Grand Prix season
- 9 October - A1 Team South Africa finishes 12th in the sprint race and 22nd in the main race of the German A1 Grand Prix of Nations held at the Euro Speedway, dropping them to 14th place
- 23 October - A1 Team South Africa finishes 10th in the sprint race and 22nd in the main race of the Portuguese A1 Grand Prix of Nations held at the Autódromo do Estoril, dropping them to share 16th place with A1 Team Japan
- 6 November - A1 Team South Africa finishes 21st in the sprint race and 24th in the main race of the Australian A1 Grand Prix of Nations held at the Eastern Creek Raceway, stay in 16th place with the A1 Team Japan
- 20 November - A1 Team South Africa finishes 21st in the sprint race and 12th in the main race of the Malaysian A1 Grand Prix of Nations held at the Sepang International Circuit, dropping them to share 17th place with the A1 Team Japan
- 11 December - A1 Team South Africa finishes 12th in the sprint race and 3rd in the main race of the United Arab Emirates A1 Grand Prix of Nations held at the Dubai Autodrome, climbing to 15th place overall in the 2005/6 season

== Swimming ==
- 24 July - Roland Schoeman sets a new world record in the men's 50-metre butterfly during the semi-finals at the 2005 World Aquatics Championships in Montreal, Quebec, Canada
- 25 July - Roland Schoeman wins gold and breaks his own world record in the men's 50-metre butterfly final at the World Aquatics Championships in Montreal, Quebec, Canada
- 30 July - Roland Schoeman wins his second gold in the men's 50-metre Freestyle swimming final at the World Aquatics Championships in Montreal, Quebec, Canada

== See also ==
- 2004 in South African sport
- 2005 in South Africa
- 2006 in South African sport
- List of years in South African sport
