= 2002 in South African sport =

This is a list of events in South African sport in 2002.

== Athletics ==
- Mbulaeni Mulaudzi wins bronze in the 800 metres at the 13th African Championships in Athletics held in Radès, Tunisia.

== Football (Soccer) ==
- 19 November - South Africa (Bafana Bafana) loses to Senegal 4–1 after drawing 1-1 and then losing 4–1 on penalties in the Nelson Mandela Challenge held in Ellis Park Stadium, Johannesburg

== Mind Sports ==
- Mind Sports South Africa hosts the International Wargames Federation's World Championships in Port Elizabeth, South Africa
- Moses Rannyadi wins gold in the Morabaraba event at such World Championships.

== See also ==
- 2001 in South African sport
- 2002 in South Africa
- 2003 in South African sport
- List of years in South African sport
