= 2004 in South African sport =

This is a list of events in South African sport in 2005.

== Athletics ==
- 7 March - Mbulaeni Mulaudzi wins gold in the 800 metres at the 10th IAAF World Indoor Championships in Athletics held in Budapest
- 28 August - Mbulaeni Mulaudzi wins silver in the 800 metres at the 28th Olympic Games held in Athens

== Football (Rugby Union) ==
=== June ===
- 12 June - The South Africa (Springboks) beat Ireland 31-17 at Vodacom Park, Bloemfontein
- 19 June - The Springboks beat Ireland 26-17 at Newlands, Cape Town
- 26 June - The Springboks beat Wales (The Dragons) 53-18 in Pretoria

=== July ===
- 17 July - The Springboks beat the Pacific Islanders 38-24
- 24 July - The Springboks lose to New Zealand (All Blacks) 23-21 at Jade Stadium, Christchurch in the Tri Nations Series
- 31 July - The Springboks lose to Australia (Wallabies) 30-26 at the Subiaco Oval, Perth, Western Australia in the Tri-Nations Series

=== August ===
- 14 August - The Springboks beat the All Blacks 40-26 at the Ellis Park Stadium, Johannesburg in the Tri-Nations Series
- 21 August - The Springboks beat the Wallibies 23-19 in the Tri-Nations Series

=== November ===
- 6 November - The Springboks beat The Dragons 38-36 at the Millennium Stadium, Cardiff
- 13 November - The Springboks lose to Ireland 12-17 at Lansdowne Road, Dublin
- 20 November - The Springboks lose to England 16-32 at the Twickenham Stadium, London
- 27 November - The Springboks beat Scotland 45-10 at the Murrayfield Stadium, Edinburgh

=== December ===
- 4 December - The Springboks beat Argentina (los Pumas) 39-7 at José Amalfitani Stadium, Buenos Aires

== Football (Soccer) ==
- 17 November - South Africa (Bafana Bafana) beats Nigeria 2-1 in the Nelson Mandela Challenge held in Ellis Park Stadium, Johannesburg

== See also ==
- 2003 in South African sport
- 2004 in South Africa
- 2005 in South African sport
- List of years in South African sport
