= 1999 in South African sport =

This is a list of events in South African sport in 1999.

== Football (Rugby Union) ==
- 19 June - South Africa (Springboks) beats Italy 101–0

== Football (Soccer) ==
- 10 April - South Africa's national soccer team, Bafana Bafana loses 1 - 0 against Gabon at the Odi stadium in an African Nations Cup qualifier game
- 5 June - Bafana Bafana beats Mauritius 2–0 in a home game
- 27 November - Bafana Bafana beats Sweden 1–0 in the Nelson Mandela Challenge held in Loftus Versfeld Stadium, Pretoria

== See also ==
- 1998 in South African sport
- 1999 in South Africa
- 2000 in South African sport
- List of years in South African sport
