= 1992 in South African sport =

This is a list of events in South African sport in 1992.

== Football (rugby union) ==
- 15 August - South Africa plays their first test since the end of the apartheid.

== Football (soccer) ==
=== July ===
- 7 July - South Africa beats Cameroon 1–0 at King's Park Rugby Stadium, Durban in a friendly match
- 9 July - South Africa loses against Cameroon 1–2 at Goodwood Show Grounds, Cape Town in a friendly match
- 9 July - South Africa draws against Cameroon national football team 2–2 at Soccer City, Johannesburg in a friendly match

=== August ===
- 16 August - South Africa loses to Zimbabwe 1–4 at the National Sports Stadium, Harare, Zimbabwe in the African Nations Cup qualifiers
- 30 August - South Africa loses to Zambia 0–1 at Soccer City, Johannesburg in the African Nations Cup qualifiers

=== October ===
- 10 October - South Africa loses to Nigeria 0–4 at Surulere Stadium, Lagos, Nigeria in the World Cup qualifiers
- 24 October - South Africa beats Congo 1–0 at Soccer City, Johannesburg in the World Cup qualifiers

== Motorsport ==
- 1 March - The South African Grand Prix, is held at Kyalami

== See also ==
- 1992 in South Africa
- 1993 in South African sport
- List of years in South African sport
