= 1993 in South African sport =

This is a list of events in South African sport in 1993.

== Boxing ==
- 19 March - Ditau Molefyane wins the World Boxing Federation (WBF) junior lightweight title

== Football (Soccer) ==
=== January ===
- 10 January - South Africa beats Botswana 2–0 at National Stadium, Gaborone, Botswana in a friendly match
- 16 January - South Africa draws with Nigeria 0–0 at Soccer City, Johannesburg in the World Cup qualifiers
- 31 January - South Africa beats the Congo 1–0 at Municipal Stadium, Pointe Noire, Republic of the Congo in the World Cup qualifiers

=== April ===
- 11 April - South Africa draws with Mauritius 0–0 at Rand Stadium, Johannesburg in the African Nations Cup qualifiers
- 24 April - South Africa draws with Zimbabwe 1–1 at Soccer City, Johannesburg in the African Nations Cup qualifiers

=== July ===
- 11 July - South Africa loses to Zambia 0–3 at Independence Stadium, Lusaka, Zambia in the African Nations Cup qualifiers
- 25 July - South Africa beats the Mauritius 3–1 at Sir Anerood Jugnauth Stadium, Belle Vue, Mauritius in the African Nations Cup qualifiers

=== October ===
- 6 October - South Africa loses to Mexico 0–4 at the Los Angeles Memorial Coliseum, United States in a friendly match

== Motorsport ==
- 14 March - The South African Grand Prix, is held at Kyalami

== See also ==
- 1992 in South African sport
- 1993 in South Africa
- 1994 in South African sport
- List of years in South African sport
