= 1998 in South African sport =

== Cricket ==
- 19 March - Makhaya Ntini becomes the first black person to represent South Africa in a five-day test cricket match

== Football (Rugby Union) ==
- 13 June - The South Africa (Springboks) beat Ireland 37–13
- 20 June - The Springboks beat Ireland 33–0
- 28 November - The Springboks beat Ireland 27–13 at Lansdowne Road, Dublin, Ireland

== Football (Soccer) ==
- 16 December - South Africa (Bafana Bafana) beats Egypt 2–1 in the Nelson Mandela Challenge held at the FNB Stadium, Johannesburg

== See also ==
- 1997 in South African sport
- 1998 in South Africa
- 1999 in South African sport
- Timeline of South African sport
