= 1994 in South African sport =

In South Africa, many events and sports took place, like Rugby and Football, in 1994.

== Football (Rugby Union) ==
- 4 April - New South Wales rugby union officials cancel the Waratahs' visit to Durban for a Super Seven match due to political violence in Natal

== Football (Soccer) ==
=== April ===
- 24 April South Africa (Bafana Bafana) beats Zimbabwe 1-0 at the Independence Stadium, Mmabatho in a friendly match

=== May ===
- 12 May Bafana Bafana beats Zambia 2-1 at the Ellis Park Stadium, Johannesburg in the first Nelson Mandela Challenge match

=== June ===
- 8 June Bafana Bafana loses to Australia 0-1 at the Hindmarsh Stadium, Adelaide, Australia in a friendly match
- 12 June Bafana Bafana loses to Australia 0-1 at Sydney Football Stadium, Sydney, Australia in a friendly match

=== September ===
- 4 September Bafana Bafana beats Madagascar 1-0 at Mahamasina Municipal Stadium, Antananarivo, Madagascar in the African Nations Cup qualifiers

=== October ===
- 15 October Bafana Bafana beats Mauritius 1-0 at the Odi Stadium, Mabopane in the African Nations Cup qualifiers

=== November ===
- 13 November Bafana Bafana draw with Zambia 1-1 at the Independence Stadium Lusaka, Zambia in the African Nations Cup qualifiers
- 26 November Bafana Bafana beats Ghana 2-1 at the Loftus Versfeld Stadium, Pretoria in the Simba Cup
- 30 November Bafana Bafana draws with Ivory Coast 0-0 at the Boet Erasmus Stadium, Port Elizabeth in the Simba Cup

=== December ===
- 3 December Bafana Bafana draws with Cameroon 1-1 at the Ellis Park Stadium, Johannesburg in the Simba Cup

== See also ==
- 1993 in South African sport
- 1994 in South Africa
- 1995 in South African sport
- List of years in South African sport
