= List of years in South African sport =

South African sports timeline

This is a timeline of sport in South Africa. For other events see the list of years in South Africa.

== Union of South Africa ==
1910s

- 1910
- 1911
- 1912
- 1913
- 1914
- 1915
- 1916
- 1917
- 1918
- 1919

1920s

- 1920
- 1921
- 1922
- 1923
- 1924
- 1925
- 1926
- 1927
- 1928
- 1929

1930s

- 1930
- 1931
- 1932
- 1933
- 1934
- 1935
- 1936
- 1937
- 1938
- 1939

1940s

- 1950
- 1941
- 1942
- 1943
- 1944
- 1945
- 1946
- 1947
- 1948
- 1949

1950s

- 1950
- 1951
- 1952
- 1953
- 1954
- 1955
- 1956
- 1957
- 1958
- 1959

1960s

- 1960

== Republic of South Africa ==
1960s

- 1961
- 1962
- 1963
- 1964
- 1965
- 1966
- 1967
- 1968
- 1969

1970s

- 1970
- 1971
- 1972
- 1973
- 1974
- 1975
- 1976
- 1977
- 1978
- 1979

1980s

- 1980
- 1981
- 1982
- 1983
- 1984
- 1985
- 1986
- 1987
- 1988
- 1989

1990s

- 1990
- 1991
- 1992
- 1993

== Post-apartheid ==
1990s

- 1994
- 1995
- 1996
- 1997
- 1998
- 1999

2000s

- 2000
- 2001
- 2002
- 2003
- 2004
- 2005
- 2006
- 2007
- 2008
- 2009

2010s

- 2010
- 2011
- 2012
- 2013
- 2014
- 2015
- 2016
- 2017
- 2018
- 2019

2020s

- 2020
- 2021
- 2022
- 2023
- 2024
