= 2001 in South African sport =

This is a list of events in South African sport in 2001.

== Football (soccer) ==
- 11 April - The Ellis Park Stadium Disaster, the worst sporting accident in South African history, resulted in 43 deaths at Ellis Park Stadium in the city of Johannesburg, Gauteng Province, South Africa during the local derby football match between Kaizer Chiefs and Orlando Pirates.

== See also ==
- 2000 in South African sport
- 2001 in South Africa
- 2002 in South African sport
- List of years in South African sport
