= 1959 in South African sport =

This article is an incomplete list of sporting events relevant to South Africa in 1959

== Golf ==
- Sewsunker "Papwa" Sewgolum, wins the Dutch Open for the first time
- Gary Player wins The Open Championship

== See also ==
Timeline of South African sport
