= 1962 in South African sport =

This article is an incomplete list of sporting events relevant to South Africa in 1962.

== Football (Rugby Union) ==
- South Africa national rugby union team wins three matches against the touring British Lions, and draw the fourth game.

== Golf ==
- Gary Player, wins the PGA Championship for the first time.

== Deaths ==
- 28 April – Bennie Osler international rugby union player.

== See also ==
- Timeline of South African sport
