= Howza =

- Born: Tshepo Howard Mosese; 19 July 1983 (age 41)
- Occupation(s): Rapper, actor, Television presenter, Songwriter
- Spouses: Salamina Mosese
- Musical career
- Origin: Diepkloof, Gauteng, South Africa
- Genres: Kwaito
- Years active: 2002–present
- Labels: Universal Music
- Website: www.faithinc.co.za

Tshepo Howard Mosese (born 19 July 1983) is a South African rapper, songwriter and actor. Mosese was involved in school choirs and cultural activities. He was a member of Gunpowder group. Having signed with Faith Records in 2007, he began his solo career and released solo debut album Cut to the Chase (2007).

Mosese also pursued his acting career, Backstage, Scandal, 7de Laan, Big Up, All You Need is Love (2012).

== Early years ==
In 2002, he joined the hip hop group Gunpowder, which was, at the time, under the same label as Kabelo Mabalane. In 2007 Kabelo, AKA Bouga Luv offered Howza a record deal as a solo artist under faith records.

== Acting career ==
Howza has also gone on to appear on e.tv’s Backstage in a lead role as the character "Chase". He also appeared in Generations as a supporting character, "Adam" and plays "Lerumo Chabedi" in South African soap opera Scandal!.

He made a guest appearance in the Disney+ animated series Kizazi Moto: Generation Fire.
