= 1964 in South African sport =

This article is an incomplete list of sporting events relevant to South Africa in 1964.

== Rugby union ==
- 23 May – South Africa national rugby union team beat the touring Welsh side 24 to 3
- 25 July - South Africa national rugby union team beat the touring France team 8 to 3

== Golf ==
- Sewsunker "Papwa" Sewgolum, wins the Dutch Open for the third time
- Cobie Legrange, wins the Dunlop Masters

== Athletics ==
- March-Peter Snell (New Zealand) becomes the first athlete to run a 4-minute mile in Africa, with a time of 4min.39.6sec. This is on Kings Park cinder track, Durban, Natal. Peter Snell also wins both the 880 yards (1.50.4 sec) & one mile (4.06.2sec) at the South African Athletic championships.

== See also ==
Timeline of South African sport
