= South African Class 8E =

1983 design of electric locomotive

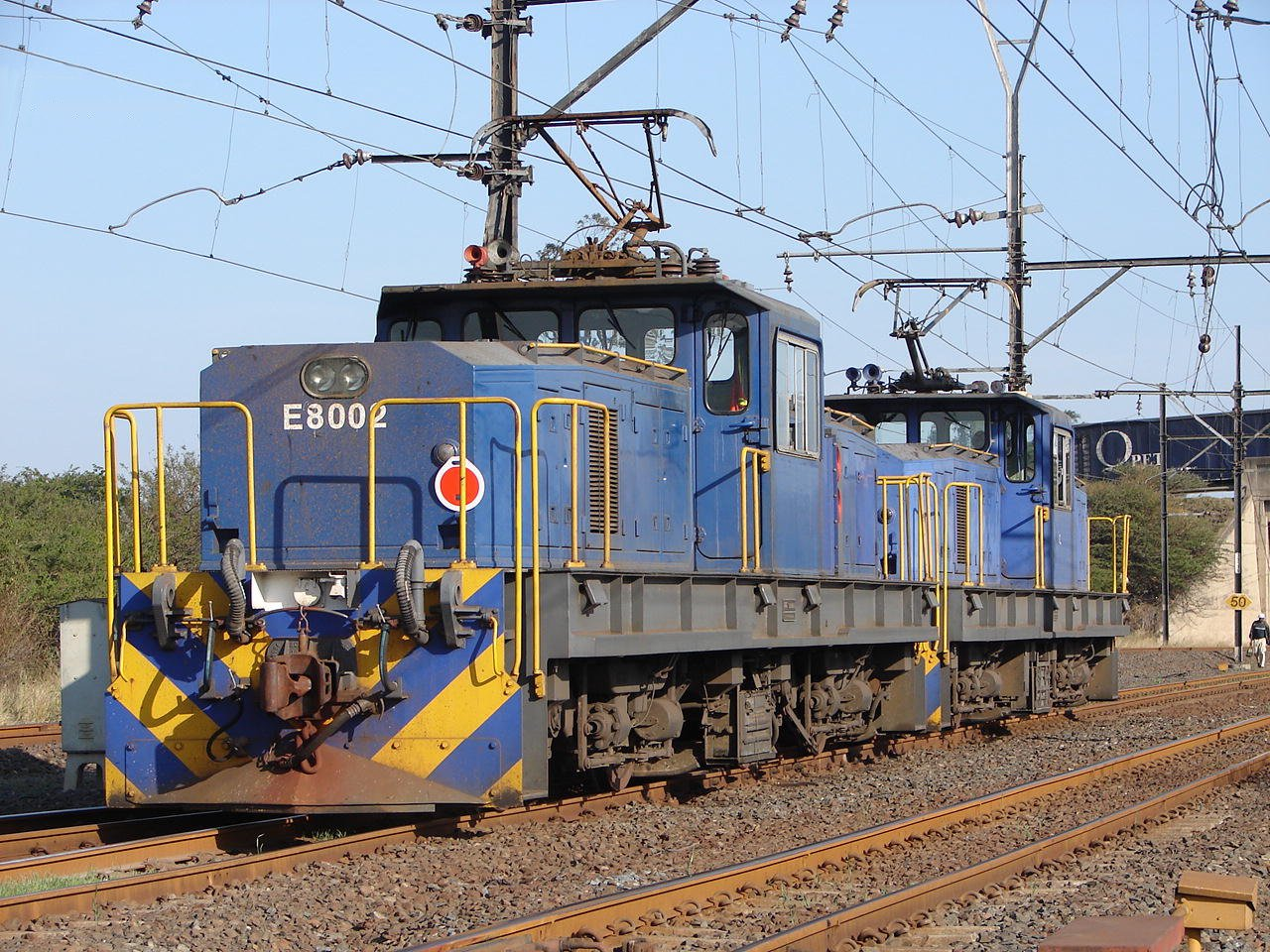
- No. E8002 at Mandini, KwaZulu-Natal, 13 August 2007
Type and origin
- Power type: Electric
- Designer: BBC-Siemens
- Builder: Union Carriage & Wagon
- Serial number: Industrials 449143-449149
- Model: BBC-Siemens 8E
- Build date: 1983–1985
- Total produced: 107
Specifications
- Configuration
  - AAR: B-B
  - UIC: Bo'Bo'
  - Commonwealth: Bo-Bo
- Gauge: 3 ft 6 in (1,067 mm) Cape gauge
- Wheel diameter: 1,220 mm (48.03 in)
- Wheelbase: 11,130 mm (36 ft 6 1/4 in)
  - Bogie: 3,280 mm (10 ft 9 1/8 in)
- Pivot centres: 7,850 mm (25 ft 9 in)
- Length
  - Over couplers: 16,120 mm (52 ft 10 5/8 in)
  - Over body: 15,260 mm (50 ft 3/4 in)
- Width: 3,040 mm (9 ft 11 5/8 in)
- Height
  - Pantograph: 4,140 mm (13 ft 7 in)
  - Body height: 3,680 mm (12 ft 7/8 in)
- Axle load: 21,171 kg (46,674 lb) (E8001-E8018); 20,960 kg (46,210 lb) (E8019-E8100)
- Adhesive weight: 82,000 kg (181,000 lb) (E8001-E8018); 81,200 kg (179,000 lb) (E8019-E8100)
- Loco weight: 82,000 kg (181,000 lb) (E8001-E8018); 81,200 kg (179,000 lb) (E8019-E8100)
- Electric system/s: 3 kV DC catenary
- Current pickup(s): Pantograph
- Traction motors: Four IKB2820-OTA-02
  - Rating 1 hour: 200 kW (270 hp)
  - Continuous: 176 kW (236 hp)
- Gear ratio: 17:115
- Loco brake: Air
- Train brakes: Air & Vacuum
- Couplers: AAR knuckle
Performance figures
- Maximum speed: 75 km/h (47 mph)
- Power output
  - 1 hour: 800 kW (1,100 hp)
  - Continuous: 704 kW (944 hp)
- Tractive effort
  - Starting: 287.6 kN (64,700 lbf)
  - 1 hour: 177.3 kN (39,900 lbf)
  - Continuous: 145.3 kN (32,700 lbf) @ 17 km/h (11 mph)
Career
- Operators: South African Railways; Spoornet; Transnet Freight Rail; Driefontein Gold Mine; Impala Platinum
- Class: Class 8E
- Number in class: 107
- Numbers: SAR E8001-E8100; Dries 5-7; Implats 11-12, 14-15
- Nicknames: Cockroach
- Delivered: 1983–1985
- First run: 1983

The South African Railways Class 8E of 1983 is an electric locomotive.

Between 1983 and 1985 the South African Railways placed one hundred Class 8E centre-cab electric locomotives with a Bo-Bo wheel arrangement in shunting service. Seven more were built for the mining industry.

== Manufacturer ==
As a result of the gradual withdrawal of steam locomotives from service, many of which had been employed as shunting engines, and in addition to the Classes 36-000 and 36-200 diesel-electric locomotives, a growing need arose for a modern electric shunting locomotive for the South African Railways (SAR), especially for use in yards in the large 3 kV DC electrified centres where the Class ES and Class 1ES locomotives were also due to be withdrawn.

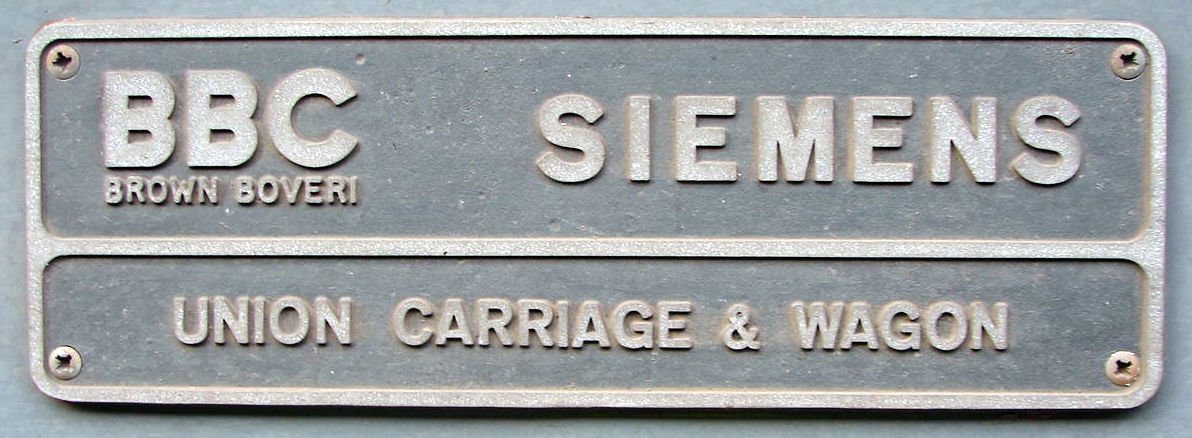
Builder's plate

The Class 8E electric shunting locomotive was designed for the SAR by a consortium consisting of Brown Boveri of Switzerland and Siemens of Germany. It was built by Union Carriage & Wagon (UCW) in Nigel, Transvaal, who also fabricated the mechanical components.

One hundred locomotives were delivered by UCW to the SAR between 1983 and 1985, numbered in the range from E8001 to E8100. Another seven units were built by UCW for the mining industry. UCW did not allocate builder's numbers to the locomotives it built for the SAR, but used the SAR unit numbers for their record keeping. The locomotives which were built by UCW for industry, on the other hand, were allocated works numbers.

== Orientation and features ==
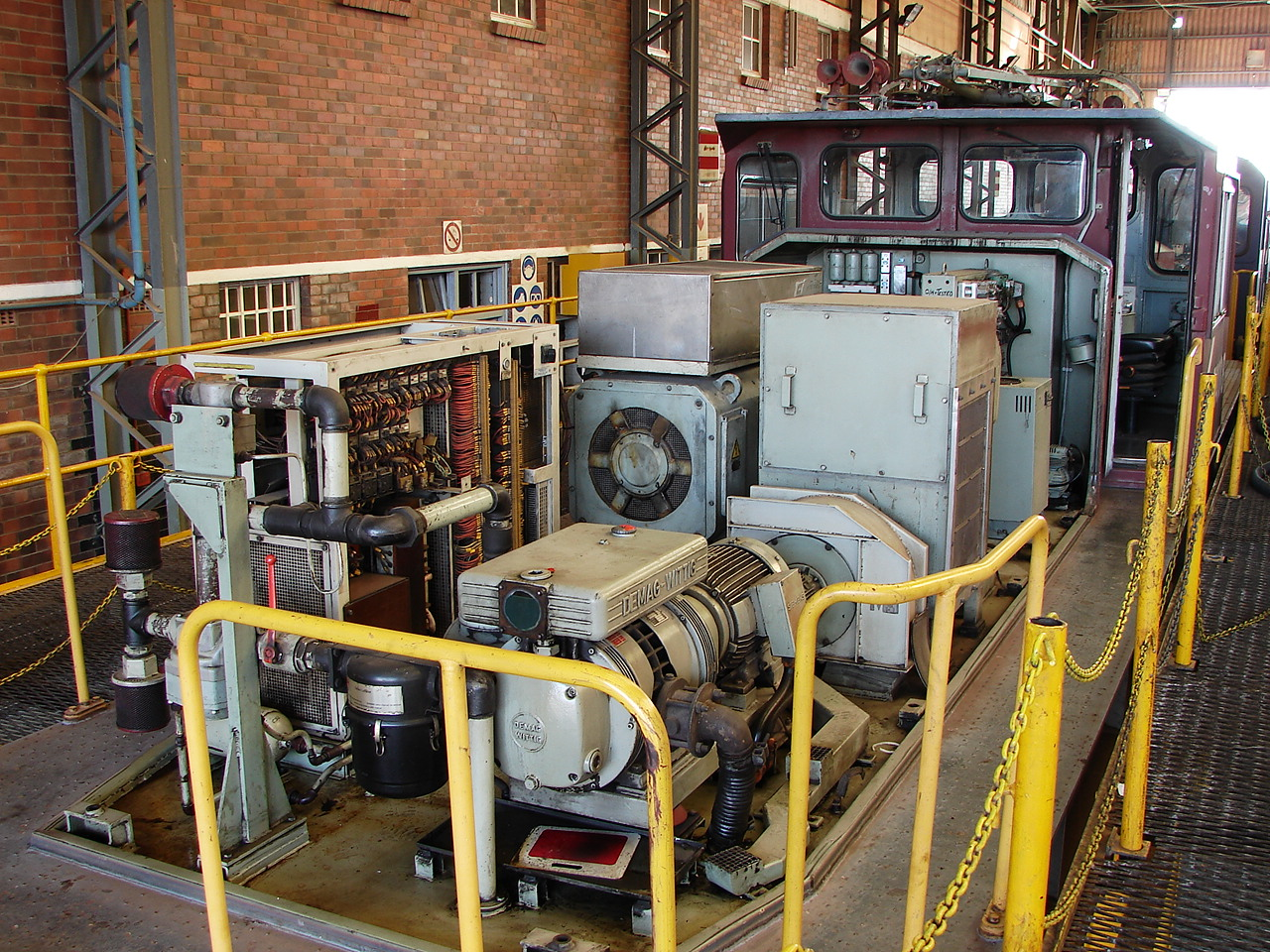
No. 1 end

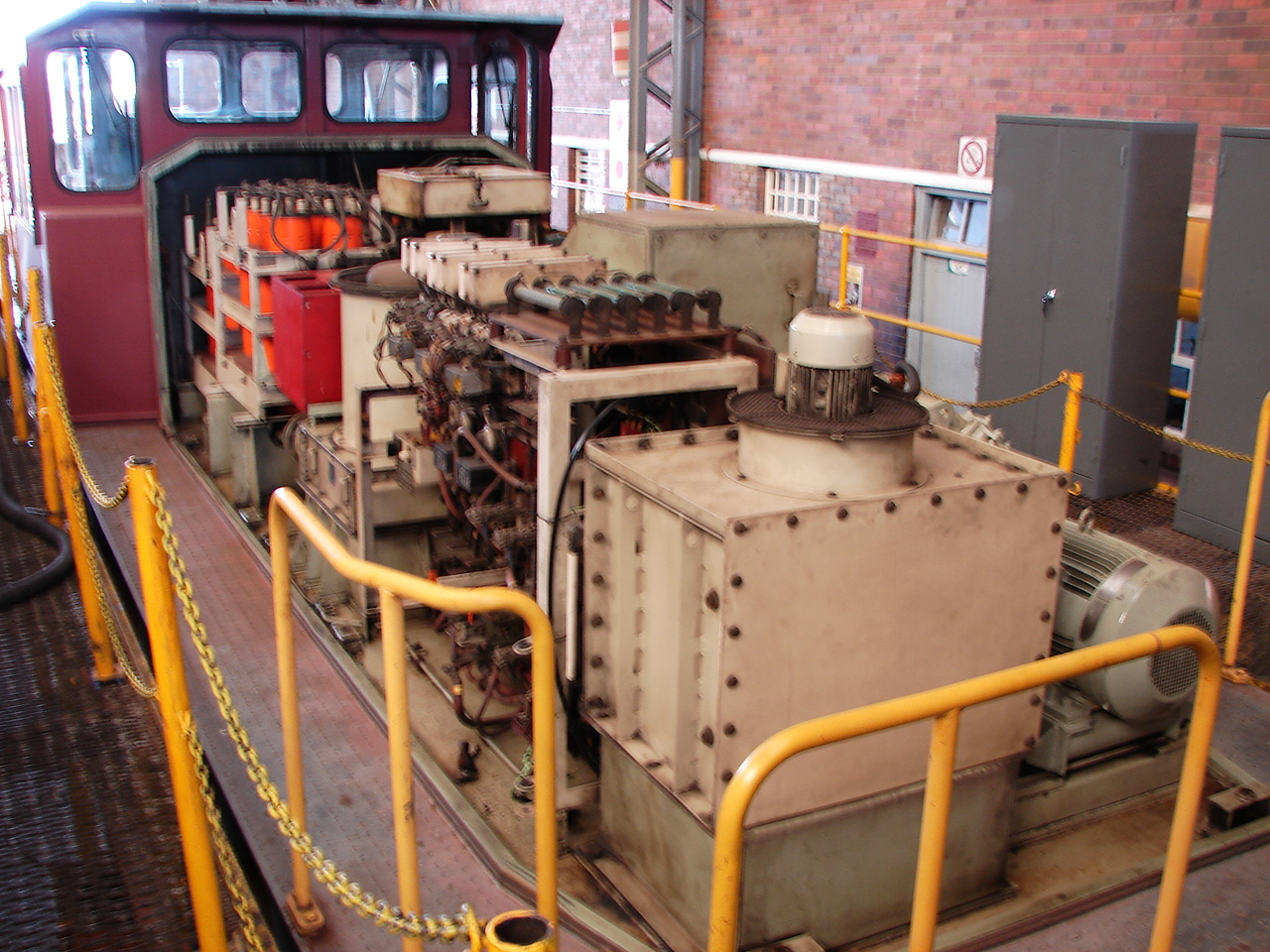
No. 2 end

The centre cab Class 8E has large grilles on the sides of both hoods on one side and a grille on the side of only the left hand side hood when viewed from the other side. The no. 1 end is the end with only a grille on one side.

The pictures alongside of no. E8008 with both hood covers removed, illustrate the different equipment installed inside the two ends of the locomotive.

The locomotive has solid state electrical control circuitry with a thyristor-controlled chopper supplying the four traction motors. Since the conventional accelerating resistors could be omitted which are used on mainline electric locomotives, considerable energy saving was accomplished on heavy shunting duties.

The bogies are based on those of the Class 6E, but with a rubber secondary suspension system which provides maximum adhesive force to the locomotive when starting from rest. The locomotive was designed to be operated by a crew of one and has two driving stations in the cab.

== Service ==
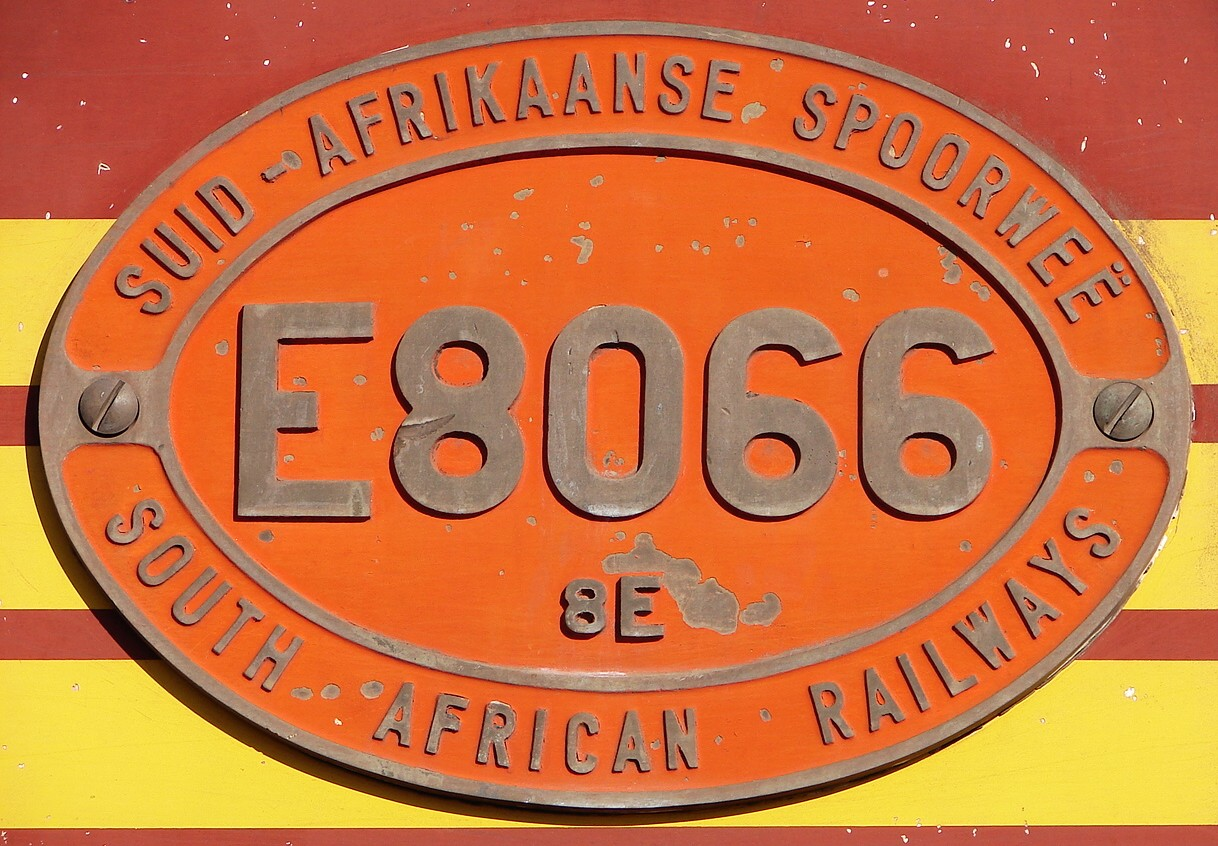

The Class 8E was initially placed in service on the Witwatersrand, but a large number of them were later allocated to Durban and to other locations in Natal. Some are also employed at Beaconsfield in Kimberley, at Postmasburg in the Northern Cape and at Nelspruit in Mpumalanga. Apart from a short period in the early 1980s when one served as the station pilot in Cape Town, working between the mainline platforms at Cape Town station and the passenger carriage yard at Culemborg, the Class 8E is unknown in the Western Cape.

They are powerful shunters and popular with their drivers, even though problems are sometimes experienced with start-up or failures while working at coastal centres such as at Umbilo in Durban. This is attributed to the damp climate which causes start-up contactor failures. Beginning in 2007, they were gradually equipped with air conditioning units for added crew comfort, similar to those installed in the Class 18E. The air conditioning unit is mounted on the running board to the right of the cab on the right hand side of the locomotive.

== Industrial use ==
At the same time that the Class 8E locomotives were being built for the SAR, another seven were built for the mining industry.

- Three were built for Driefontein Consolidated Gold Mine (Dries) near Carletonville, numbered in the range from 5 to 7 and with builder's works numbers in the range from 449145 to 449147. Of these, Dries no. 5 was withdrawn and scrapped after an accident, with the remains dumped at the mine.
- Four were built for the Impala Platinum mine (Implats) at Phokeng near Rustenburg, numbered 11, 12, 14 and 15, with builder's works numbers 449143, 449144, 449148 and 449149. In addition to these, seven SAR Class 8E locomotives, numbers E8005, E8006, E8019, E8026, E8042, E8050 and E8060, were later sold to Implats.

== Liveries ==
All the Class 8E locomotives were delivered in the SAR red oxide livery with signal red buffer beams and cowcatchers, yellow whiskers and with the number plates on the cab sides mounted on three-stripe yellow wings. In the 1990s some of them were repainted in the Spoornet maroon livery with a yellow and blue chevron pattern on the buffer beams and cowcatchers. In the late 1990s many were repainted in the Spoornet blue livery with either solid or outline numbers on the long hood sides.

== Illustration ==
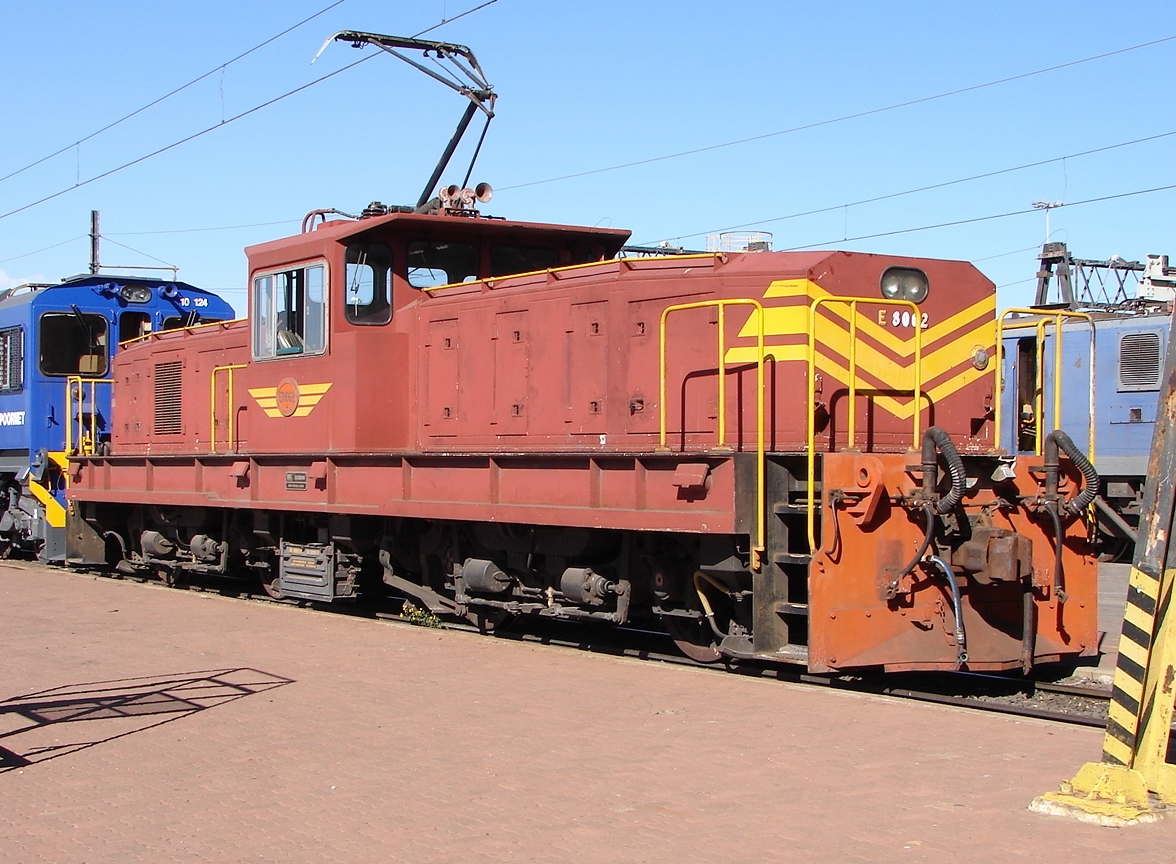
No. E8062 in SAR Gulf Red and whiskers livery at Beaconsfield, Kimberley, 17 September 2009

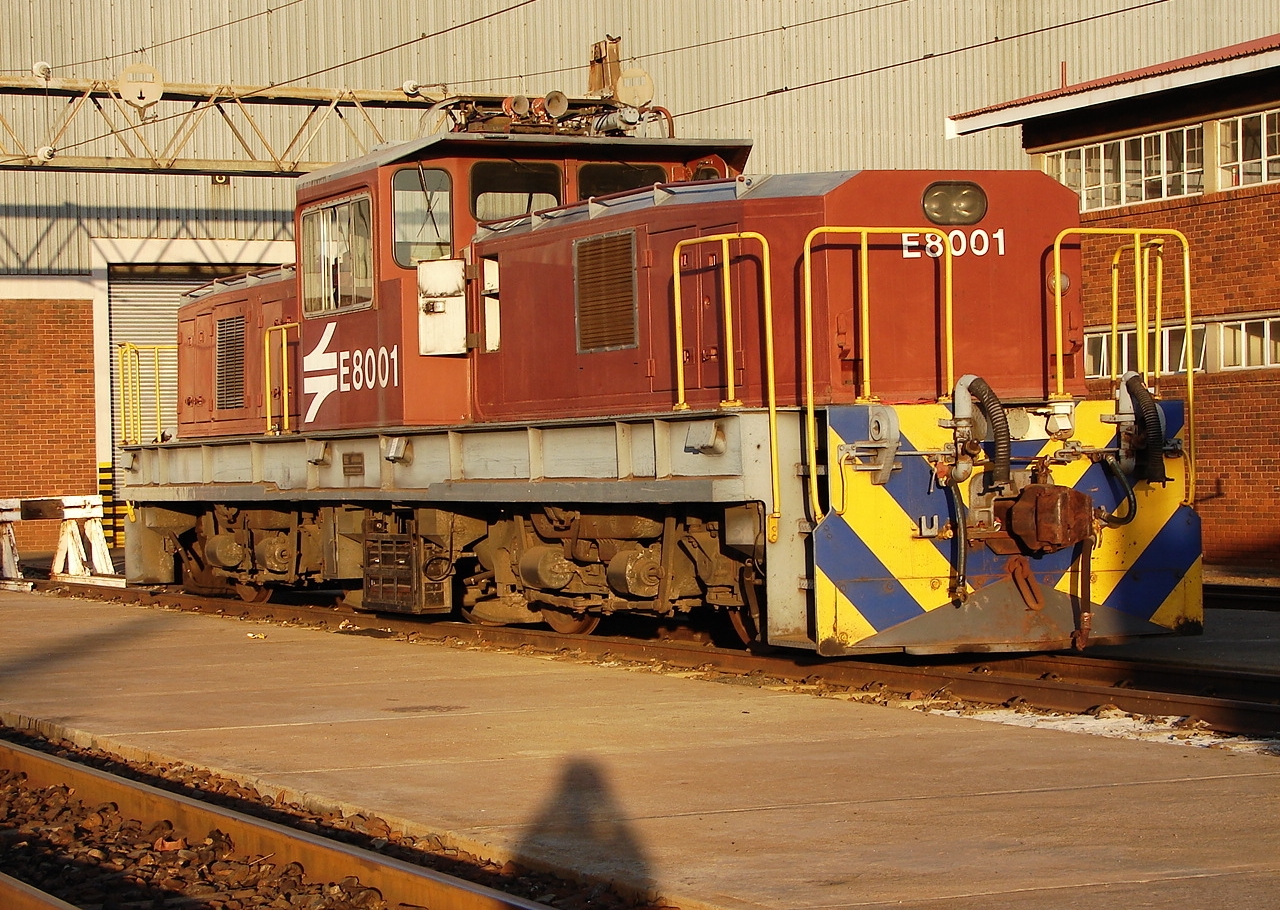
No. E8001 in Spoornet maroon livery at the Sentrarand loco depot in Gauteng, 8 October 2009

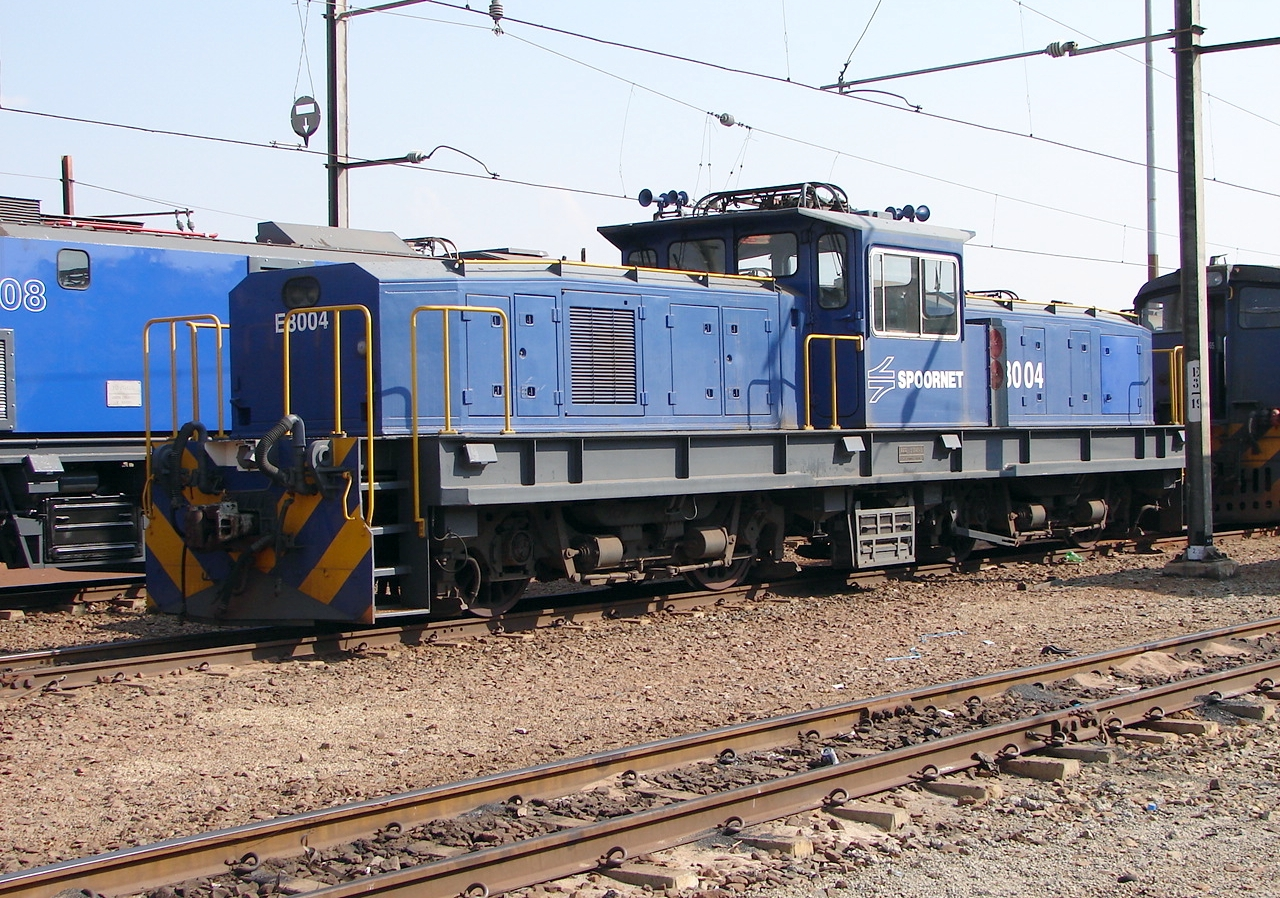
No. E8004 in Spoornet blue livery with solid numbers at the Sentrarand depot in Gauteng, 22 September 2009

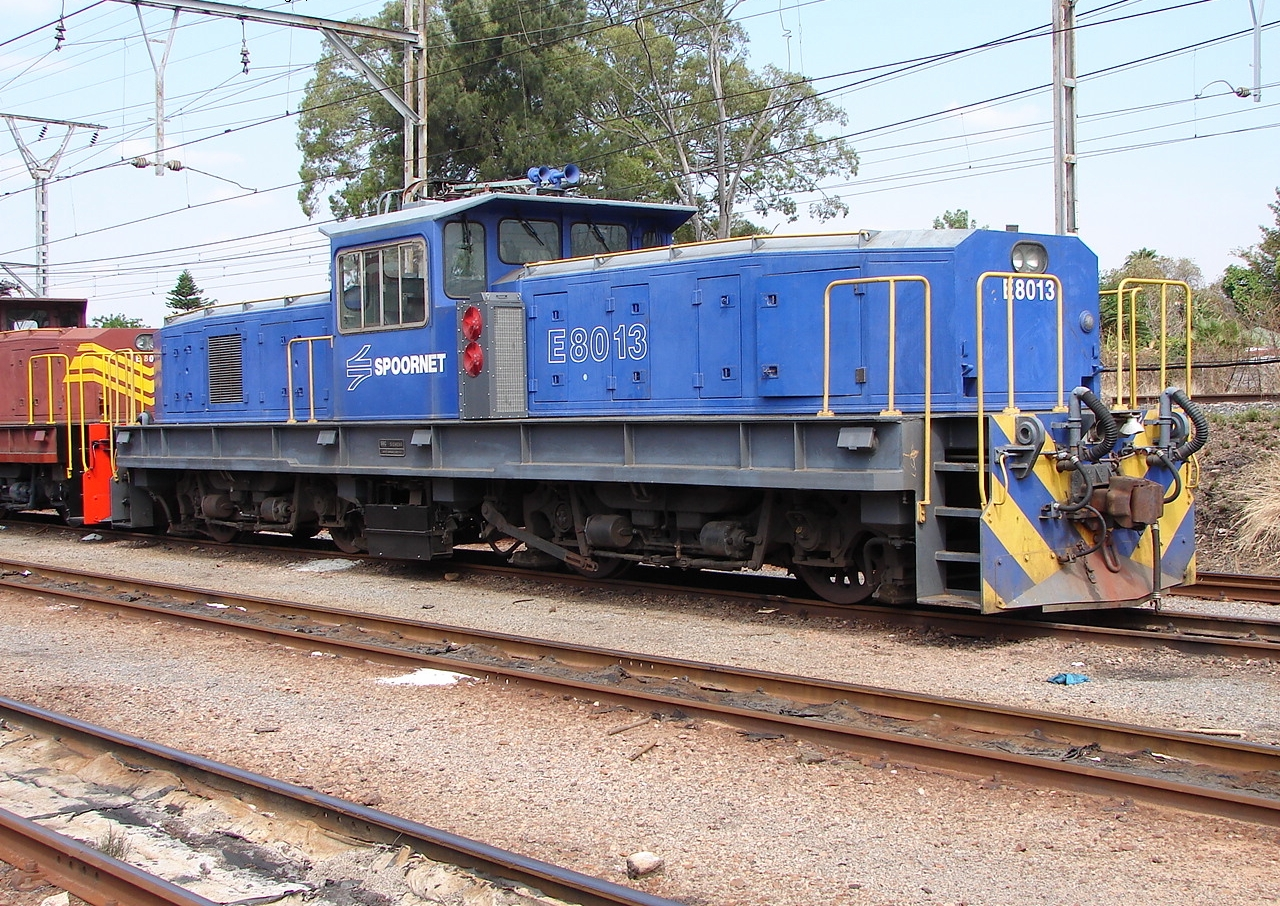
No. E8013 in Spoornet blue livery with outline numbers at Capital Park, Pretoria, 1 October 2009
