= Nelson Mandela Challenge =

- Founded: 1994
- Teams: 2
- Current champions: South Africa (2018)
- Broadcaster: SABC

The Nelson Mandela Challenge is an annual soccer match between South Africa and an invited visiting team. The challenge was founded in 1994, as a way to raise money for the Nelson Mandela Children's Fund.

== Format ==
The challenge is played as a single leg, held in South Africa on all but one occasion. In previous years the title was shared if the match was tied after 90 minutes. From 2002 the match will proceed to penalties if there is no winner after 90 minutes.

== Match results ==
10 May 1994 International Friendly	South Africa	2–1	Zambia	Johannesburg, Gauteng
UTC+2				Stadium: Ellis Park

13 May 1995 International Friendly	South Africa	1–1	Argentina	Johannesburg, Gauteng
UTC+2				Stadium: Ellis Park

24 April 1996 International Friendly	South Africa	2–3	Brazil	Johannesburg, Gauteng
UTC+2				Stadium: Soccer City

4 June 1997 International Friendly	South Africa	0–2	Netherlands	Johannesburg, Gauteng
UTC+2				Stadium: Soccer City

16 December 1998 International Friendly	South Africa	2–1	Egypt	Johannesburg, Gauteng
UTC+2				Stadium: Soccer City; Referee: Saïd Belqola (Morocco)

27 November 1999 International Friendly	South Africa	1–0	Sweden	Pretoria, Gauteng
UTC+2				Stadium: Loftus Versfeld; Referee: Edwin Senai (Botswana)

7 October 2000 International Friendly	South Africa	0–0	France	Johannesburg, Gauteng
UTC+2				Stadium: Ellis Park; Referee: Jelas Ntebu Masole (Botswana)

10 November 2001 International Friendly	South Africa	1–0	Egypt	Johannesburg, Gauteng
	Bartlett 53'	Match summary		Stadium: FNB Stadium; Attendance: 10,000; Referee: Samuel Moeketsi (Lesotho)

19 November 2002 International Friendly	South Africa	1–1 (1–4 p)	Senegal	Johannesburg, Gauteng
	Bartlett 66'	Match summary	Niang 68'	Stadium: Ellis Park; Attendance: 40,000; Referee: Felix Tangawarima (Zimbabwe)
	Penalties
	Zuma (penalty missed); Maselesele (penalty missed); Manyathela (penalty scored)		Diabang (penalty scored); Sarr (penalty scored); Makhtar Ndiaye (penalty scored); Moussa Ndiaye (penalty scored)

11 October 2003 International Friendly	South Africa	2–1	Costa Rica	Potchefstroom, North West
UTC+2				Stadium: Olen Park; Referee: Tendai Bwanya (Zimbabwe)

17 November 2004 International Friendly	South Africa	2–1	Nigeria	Johannesburg, Gauteng
UTC+2				Stadium: Ellis Park; Referee: Kenny Marange (Zimbabwe)

12 November 2005 International Friendly	South Africa	2–3	Senegal	Port Elizabeth, Eastern Cape
UTC+2				Stadium: EPRU Stadium; Referee: Falla N'Doye (Senegal)

15 November 2006 International Friendly	South Africa	0–1	Egypt	London, England
UTC+2				Stadium: Griffin Park; Referee: Robert Styles (England)

17 November 2007 International Friendly	South Africa	0–1	United States	Johannesburg, Gauteng
UTC+2		Report	Cherundolo 27'; Feilhaber (yellow card) 83'	Stadium: Ellis Park; Attendance: 30,000; Referee: Eddy Maillet (Seychellois)

19 November 2008 International Friendly	South Africa	3–2	Cameroon	Rustenburg, North West
UTC+2				Stadium: Olympia Park; Referee: Cornelius Mwanza (Zambia)

28 March 2009 International Friendly	South Africa	2–1	Norway	Phokeng, North West
UTC+2				Stadium: Royal Bafokeng Sports Palace; Referee: Cecil Fleischer (Ghana)

17 November 2010 International Friendly	South Africa	0–1	United States	Cape Town, Western Cape
UTC+2		Report	Lichaj (yellow card) 33'; Agudelo 85'	Stadium: Cape Town Stadium; Attendance: 52,000; Referee: Sylvester Kirwa (Kenya)

12 November 2011 International Friendly	South Africa	1–1	Ivory Coast	Port Elizabeth, Eastern Cape
UTC+2		Report		Stadium: Nelson Mandela Bay Stadium; Attendance: 28,000

14 November 2012 International Friendly	South Africa	0–1	Zambia	Johannesburg, Gauteng
UTC+2		Report		Stadium: Soccer City; Attendance: 17,000; Referee: Simanga Nhleko (Swaziland)

14 August 2013 International Friendly	South Africa	0–2	Nigeria	Durban, Kwa-Zulu Natal
UTC+2		Report	Nwofor 49', 68'	Stadium: Moses Mabhida Stadium; Attendance: 17,000; Referee: Ruzive Ruzive (Zimbabwe)

30 November 2014 International Friendly	South Africa	2–0	Ivory Coast	Nelspruit, Mpumalanga
UTC+2	Zungu 31'; Zulu 53'	Report		Stadium: Mbombela Stadium; Referee: Tirelo Mositwane (Botswana)

8 September 2015 International Friendly	South Africa	1–0	Senegal	Johannesburg, Gauteng
19:00 UTC+2	Makola 78'			Stadium: Orlando Stadium; Referee: Eric Otogo-Castane (Gabon)

6 September 2016 International Friendly	South Africa	1–0	Egypt	Johannesburg, Gauteng
19:05 UTC+2	Makola 7'			Stadium: Orlando Stadium; Referee: Davies Omweno (Kenya)

20 November 2018 International Friendly	South Africa	1–1	Paraguay	Durban, Kwa-Zulu Natal
	Tau 90+3'		Santander 32'	Stadium: Moses Mabhida Stadium; Referee: Ahmad Imtehaz Heeralall (Mauritius)

=== All-time record ===
Team	Played	Wins	Draws	Losses	Goals scored	Goals conceded
South Africa	24	12	4	8	28	24
