= 1987 in South Africa =

- Decades: 1960s; 1970s; 1980s; 1990s; 2000s
- See also: List of years in South Africa

The following lists events that happened during 1987 in South Africa.

== Incumbents ==
- State President: P.W. Botha.
- Chief Justice: Pieter Jacobus Rabie.

== Events ==
January

- 1 – South African Defence Force servicemen are attacked in Alexandra, Johannesburg and at least one is injured.
- 3 – Three people are injured when a limpet mine explodes at the corner of Jeppe and Delvers Streets in Johannesburg.
- 8 – At the AECI plant, a police officer is shot at and in the skirmish that follows, two policemen and one civilian are injured.
- 9 – A bomb explodes at the OK Bazaars, a national supermarket chain, in Eloff Street, Johannesburg during a protracted strike.
- 9 – The signal cabin controlling the Johannesburg railway station is gutted by fire. Within 100 minutes of the disaster trains were moving again under the control of signals technicians and flagmen.
- 9 – A riot squad policeman is killed and two injured when a grenade is thrown into their vehicle.
- 9 – Police raid English-language newspapers, seizing documents related to an advertisement calling for the legalising of the African National Congress.
- 20 – The Margo Commission, which is set up to investigate the air disaster in which Samora Machel, Mozambican President, was killed, commences.
- 21 – Twelve people are killed, including seven children, in KwaMakutha near Amanzimtoti, when the home of the United Democratic Front activist Bheki Ntuli is attacked by a group of men armed with AK-47 rifles.
- 23 – Two militants are killed in Soweto.
- 24 – One Transkei soldier or police officer is injured in an Umkhonto we Sizwe attack in Mendu, Willowvale.
- 30 – Three soldiers and one police officer are killed in an attack in Alexandra, Johannesburg.
- 31 – The home of town councillor Senokoane in Diepmeadow, Soweto is attacked and six people are injured, including two police officers.

February

- 2 – The single quarters of the Bokomo Police Station is attacked twice with grenades and one policeman is injured.
- 5 – An Explosion at a bus shelter outside the Groote Schuur Hospital injures one person.
- 18 – A number of people are killed in a grenade attack on Tladi Secondary School.
- 19 – Chief Lushaba and Samuel Jamile of the Inkatha Freedom Party are injured when a grenade is thrown at them.
- A limpet mine explosion causes damage to a shop in Matatiele.

March

- 3 – A militant is shot and killed by police in Gugulethu after he fired on their patrol with an AK-47.
- 9 – One police officer and two municipal police officers are killed in Gugulethu. One militant is also possibly killed but this is unconfirmed.
- 11 – Police confirms a skirmish at Zone 13 Mdantsane in Ciskei, but gives no details.
- 11 – A militant is shot and killed in a house in New Crossroads.
- 12 – Sweden announces a total boycott on trade with South Africa, effective from October.
- 13 – Four municipal police officers are killed and one injured in Atteridgeville.
- 16 – A grenade is thrown at the home of a police officer in Kagiso but causes no injuries.
- 17 – During a police raid in Inanda, a cadre and a woman are killed. Another man and a baby are injured in the raid.
- 17 – Three explosions damage the railway line between Newcastle and Johannesburg.
- 28 – An anti-tank landmine kills four people and injures one in the Josefsdal area near the Swaziland border.

April

- 1 – Three soldiers are killed and two injured when a grenade is thrown into their Hippo armoured personnel carrier in either Mabopane or Mamelodi.
- 1 – A grenade is thrown at the home of Councillor Radebe in Dobsonville, with no injuries.
- 2 – Three policemen are injured in Nyanga when a grenade is thrown at them.
- 8 – Two militants and a police officer are killed in a shootout at Ventersdorp.
- 9 – 35 miners are killed in a methane explosion in the Trans-Natal Colliery disaster.
- 9 – Three police officers come under attack in Meadowlands Zone 10.
- 10 – Ciskei, South Africa and Transkei sign a security pact in Cape Town, prohibiting cross-border violence between the three states.
- 14 – The home of a police officer in Chesterfield, Durban, comes under grenade attack with no injuries.
- 15 – A special branch police officer is killed by a sniper and another injured south of Durban in Umbumbulu.
- 16 – An explosion in the parking area of a Newcastle supermarket injures two people.
- 20 – A grenade is thrown at group of soldiers at the Dube train station in Soweto. No casualties are reported.
- 23 – The home of a police officer in Bonteheuwel comes under grenade attack.
- 24 – During a riot police raid in Umlazi, Durban, two militants are killed and three riot police officers are injured.
- 24 – Police invade the UCT campus in an unprecedented show of force.
- 30 – Four police officers are injured in a grenade attack on their barracks in Osizweni, Newcastle.

May

- 5 – Two people are killed and twenty injured in a landmine explosion on a road close to Messina near the Zimbabwe border.
- 5 – Two mini-limpets explode at the Johannesburg Civic Centre, with no injuries.
- 6 – The National Party wins the General Elections. The Conservative Party becomes the official opposition, ousting the Progressive Federal Party.
- 9 – A police officer, three soldiers and a cadre are killed in a skirmish in Mamelodi.
- 16 – An explosion occurs at Newcastle train station's waiting room and while police are investigating the blast, a second bomb explodes, injuring a police officer.
- 19 – An explosion occurs at the Carlton Centre in central Johannesburg.
- 20 – Two bombs explode at the Johannesburg magistrate's court. The first minor explosion acts as a decoy and is followed by a second more powerful charge minutes later, which kills three police officers and injure four others and six bystanders.

June

- 4 – State President of South Africa Pieter Willem Botha visits Sharpeville.
- 11 – During a police raid in Emdeni, Soweto, police are ambushed and a cadre and a police officer are killed.
- 12 – Two police officers are found murdered in Witbank.
- 12 – A Limpet mine explodes at the Athlone Magistrates Court in Johannesburg.
- 15 – The home of a councillor in Gugulethu comes under grenade attack and four people are injured, two of them special constables.
- 21 – A police patrol is attacked with grenades and seven police officers are injured.

July

- 6 – Umkhonto we Sizwe ambushes the police in Mdantsane. Two police officers are killed and three injured. A militant is also shot and killed.
- 6 – A milestone meeting is held in Dakar, Senegal between 52 mainly Afrikaans-speaking intellectuals led by Dr Frederik van Zyl Slabbert and the banned African National Congress led by Thabo Mbeki.
- 8 – Police crush a cadre and his sister to death in a shack in Motherwell after they were fired on.
- 8 – A limpet mine explodes at 11h12 in the bar of the Village Main Hotel, Johannesburg.
- 9 – Mozambique and the Soviet Union reject the findings of the Margo Commission on the air disaster in which Samora Machel, Mozambiqian President, was killed.
- 12 – During a police raid in Athlone, Johannesburg, a militant is killed and four arrested.
- 18 – A police officer and his wife are injured in attack on their home in Mamelodi East.
- 20 – A car bomb explodes outside a block of flats in District Six, Cape Town, with no injuries.
- 25 – A grenade is thrown at a home in Pimville but harmlessly explodes outside the house.
- 30 – An anti-tank landmine injures three people on the farm Bodena, owned by Danie Hough.
- 30 – A car bomb explodes outside the Witwatersrand Command and kills one soldier and injures 68 people.

August

- 3 – 23 conscripts publicly announce in Cape Town that they refuse to serve in the SADF.
- 5 – A militant is killed in shootout with police on Ntshekisa Road in New Brighton, Port Elizabeth.
- 13 – An Emdeni police Sergeant is injured when a grenade is thrown at his vehicle.
- 13 – The South African Defence Force launches Operation Moduler.
- 23 – A shop in Emdeni, frequented by soldiers, is attacked with grenades.
- 24 – A grenade is thrown at a police vehicle in Emdeni. Two police officers and eight bystanders are injured.
- 27 – The home of the former Mayor of Soweto, Kunene, is attacked and two council police officers are killed.
- 30 – A grenade is thrown at five soldiers outside barracks. An estimated eight SADF members are killed or injured.

September

- 2 – Police in Sandton kills a militant after he threw a grenade at a roadblock.
- 17 – Religious leaders, including Desmond Tutu, hold talks with the African National Congress in Zambia.
- 23 – South Africa and Malawi sign an agreement for the training of Malawian nurses in South Africa.
- 24 – Ten people, including two police officers, are injured in grenade attack on a police patrol in Soweto.
- 28 – Two bombs explode at the Standard Bank arena in Johannesburg.
- The South African Army kills four and captures two militants near the Zimbabwe border. After the two cadres are handed over to police, they escape killing two police officers. The army later tracks them down and kills them in a fire-fight.
- The Commander of KwaNdebele National Guard Unit in Marble Hall and his son, a police officer, is shot and killed by AK-47 fire.

October

- 1 – A bomb placed outside the door of Amichand Rajbansi's NPP office in Lenasia explodes hours after official opening, with no injuries.
- 28 – Near the Swaziland border a soldier is killed and a militant wounded in a skirmish.

November

- 5 – Govan Mbeki is released from custody of Apartheid government after serving 24 years in the Robben Island prison.
- 6 – A special constable and two civilians are killed by sniper fire in Khayelitsha.
- 12 – Two limpet mines explode and a third one is safely detonated by police at the Zola Municipal offices in Soweto.
- 14 – During a South African Defence Force commemoration march in Cape Town, a limpet mine explodes in a bin, injuring a soldier.
- 18 – A Limpet mine is found and defused at the Johannesburg post office.
- 23 – During a police raid on a house in Umlazi, Durban two guerillas and an alleged collaborator are killed. Two police officers are injured in the raid.
- 28 – South African Airways Flight 295 crashes into the Indian Ocean near Mauritius due to a fire in the cargo hold, killing 159 passengers and crew.
- 30 – Three explosions occur at the Dube municipal training centre in Soweto, with no injuries.

December

- 10 – During a police raid on a shack in the Port Elizabeth area, they meet heavy resistance from the residents. The police drive a Casspir over the shack, killing four.
- 12 – A group of police officers are fired upon by militants from a moving car in Soweto. Two police officers are killed and four injured.

Unknown date

- Bulelani Ngcuka joins the United Democratic Front in the Western Cape.

== Births ==
- 6 January – Bongani Khumalo, footballer
- 21 January – Shaun Keeling, olympics silver medalist rower
- 6 February – Kyle Brown, olympics bronze medallist & South African Sevens team player
- 6 March – Bobby van Jaarsveld, Afrikaans-language singer
- 23 March – Stacey Doubell, badminton player
- 26 March – Philip Snyman, captain of the South Africa national rugby sevens team & olympics bronze medallist
- 5 May – Matthew Brittain, olympics gold medalist rower
- 13 May – Sifiso Nhlapo, racing cyclist
- 14 May – François Steyn, Springbok rugby player
- 19 May – Connell Cruise, singer-songwriter
- 9 June – Roxy Louw, surfer, model and actress
- 18 June – Ayanda Jiya, singer, songwriter and record producer
- 20 June – Itumeleng Khune, South Africa national football team captain
- 25 June – Bonang Matheba, tv presenter, radio personality, businesswoman
- 5 July – Irvette van Zyl, long-distance runner
- 20 July – Riky Rick, rapper, songwriter and actor
- 10 September – Kelli Shean, golfer
- 26 September – Warren Shankland, cricketer
- 9 October – Stephanie Sandler, rhythmic gymnast
- 20 October – Anele Ngcongca, football player
- 9 November – Zahara, musician (died 2023)
- 15 November – DJ Maphorisa, record producer and DJ
- 9 December – Keri-anne Payne, South African born-British swimmer
- 13 December – Thabo Matlaba, football player
- 29 December – Pearl Modiadie, tv presenter, radio DJ, actress and producer

== Deaths ==
- 13 January – Thomas Davidson, cricketer. (born 1906)
- 2 February – David du Plessis, South African-born American Pentecostal minister. (b. 1905)
- 2 March – Ernest Holmes, cricketer. (b. 1918)
- 24 April – Hubert Davison, cricketer. (b. 1905)
- 8 May – Hugh Saunders, South African RAF officer. (b. 1894)
- 26 June – Glen Hall, cricketer. (b. 1938)
- 9 July – Nevil Hall, Olympic wrestler (1936) (b. 1915).
- 25 August – Sam Kahn, politician. (b. 1911)
- 8 September – Margaret Mary Smith, ichthyologist.(b. 1916).
- 7 October – Cedric Phatudi, Chief Minister of Lebowa bantustan (b. 1912)

== Railways ==
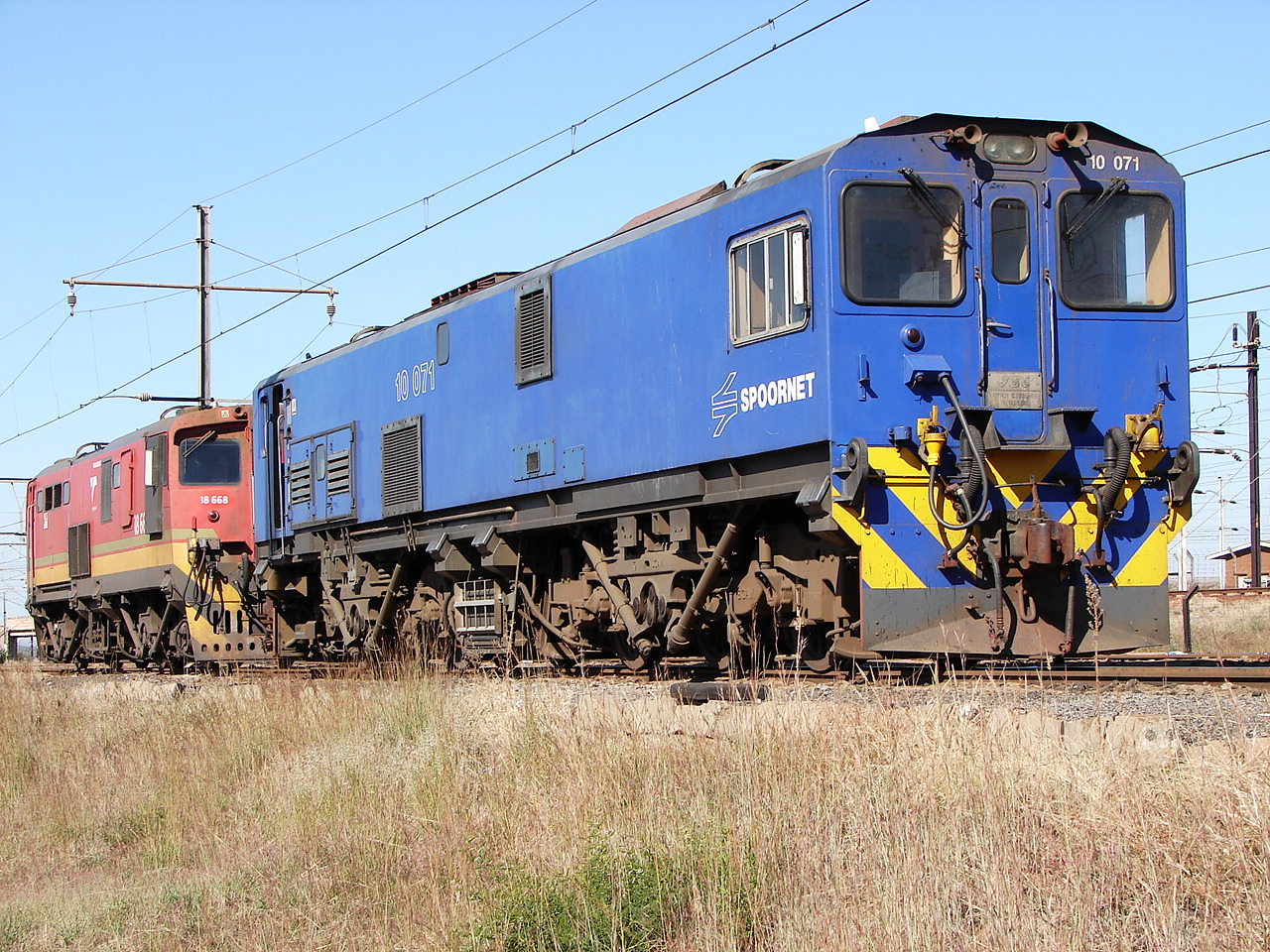
Class 10E1, Series 1

=== Locomotives ===
- The South African Railways places the first of fifty Class 10E1, Series 1 electric locomotives in mainline service.

== Sports ==
=== Athletics ===
- 2 May – Zithulele Sinqe wins his second national title in the men's marathon, clocking 2:10:51 in Stellenbosch.
