= 1984 in South Africa =

- Decades: 1960s; 1970s; 1980s; 1990s; 2000s
- See also: List of years in South Africa

The following lists events that happened during 1984 in South Africa.

== Incumbents ==
- State President:
  - Marais Viljoen (until 3 September).
  - P.W. Botha (from 14 September).
- Prime Minister: P.W. Botha (until 14 September).
- Chief Justice: Pieter Jacobus Rabie.

== Events ==
January

- 8 – The South African Defence Force begins withdrawal from southern Angola.
- 16 – The South African Railways inaugurates the MetroBlitz interurban high speed train service between Pretoria and Johannesburg.
- 30 – Patrick McCall of the Stander gang is killed by police in a raid on the gang's hide-out in Houghton, Johannesburg.

February

- 3 – A bomb destroys the offices of the Ciskei consulate in Durban.
- 23 – An Escom installation in Georgetown is slightly damaged by an explosion.
- 29 – Two bombs explode at Mandini, one at a sub-station and the other at the police station.

March

- 11 – The Mobil fuel depot in Ermelo is rocked by four explosions and five storage tanks are destroyed.
- 12 – During a skirmish with insurgents, two policemen are seriously injured.
- 16 – South Africa and Mozambique sign the Nkomati Accord, a non-aggression treaty, at Komatipoort.
- 23 – Dorothy Nyembe is released from Kroonstad Prison after serving 15 years.

April

- 3 – The African National Congress denies responsibility after a car bomb explodes on the Victoria Embankment, Durban, killing three and injuring twenty.
- 5 – The Transkei consulate in Botshabelo is destroyed by a bomb.
- An insurgent is killed at De Deur.

May

- 2 – South Africa, Mozambique and Portugal sign an agreement on electricity supply from the Cahora Bassa dam.
- 5 – Over 7,000 people attend an Afrikaner Volkswag rally in Pretoria.
- 12 – A bomb explodes at the Trust Bank in Durban.
- 13 – The Mobil Oil Refinery in Durban comes under RPG-7 attack by Umkhonto we Sizwe insurgents who are all killed afterwards in a running battle with police.
- 16 – Outside the Jabulani Police station in Soweto an explosion destroys two private vehicles belonging to policemen.
- 18 – The railway line near Lenasia is damaged by an explosion.
- 29 – Prime Minister P.W. Botha and minister of foreign affairs Pik Botha visit Austria, Belgium, France, Great Britain, Italy, Portugal, Switzerland and West Germany.
- Mutineers systematically kill most camp administration members at Umkhonto we Sizwe's Pango training camp in Angola.

June

- 21 – An explosion damages a sub-station in Berea, Durban and disrupts electricity supply.
- 28 – Jeannette Schoon and her six-year-old daughter Katryn are killed by a letter bomb at Lubango, Angola.

July

- 9 – South Africa signs the amendment of the International Convention for the Conservation of Atlantic Tunas.
- 12 – One policeman is killed and one is injured when their vehicle is attacked in Jabulani.
- 28 – The South African Railways Police charge office in KwaMashu, Durban is attacked with hand grenades.

August

- 3 – A guerrilla is killed in the Ellisras area.
- 7 – Tshabalala Dry Cleaners in Soweto is extensively damaged by Umkhonto we Sizwe.
- 7 – An Escom sub-station is destroyed in Glenmore, Durban.
- 12 – The Department of Internal Affairs of Johannesburg is hit by an explosion that causes minor damage.
- 16 – Two Limpet mines destroy two floors of the South African Police HQ, Soweto East in Roodepoort, injuring the District Commander, four policemen and two civilians.
- 17 – A guerrilla is killed while resisting arrest in Mapetla.
- 22 – Elections to the new House of Representatives are held.
- 23 – Explosions destroy 4th floor offices of the government in a building in Booysens, Johannesburg.
- 24 – A bomb explodes in Anchor Life Building in Johannesburg, destroying the South African Railways Police regional offices and the Department of Internal Affairs offices.
- 22 – Elections to the new House of Delegates are held.

September

- 3 – A limpet mine placed by Mo Shaik explodes at the Department of Internal Affairs in Johannesburg.
- 3 – A violent march in the Vaal Triangle inaugurates a prolonged township uprising.
- 5 – An explosion destroys an Escom sub-station at Rustenburg and disrupts power to Rustenburg and a large area of Bophutatswana.
- 13 – A Limpet mine causes damage to a Durban sub-station.
- 14 – The position of Prime Minister is abolished.
- 14 – P.W. Botha is inaugurated as the first executive State President of South Africa.
- 14 – A bomb explodes at the Department of Community Development in Krugersdorp.

October

- 8 – South Africa, Mozambique and Renamo hold talks in Pretoria to end the civil war in Mozambique.
- 16 – Anglican Archbishop Desmond Tutu is awarded the Nobel Peace Prize.

December

- 11 – A section of railway line near Durban and a goods train are damaged by an explosion.
- 14 – A guerrilla is killed and a policeman is injured in a skirmish in Ingwavuma.
- 18 – Foreign minister Pik Botha and President of Somalia Siad Barre hold talks in Mogadishu.
- 25 – Another guerrilla is killed in Ingwavuma.

== Births ==
- 21 January – Aaron Phangiso, cricketer
- 24 January – Senzo Meyiwa, South Africa national football team captain (d. 2014)
- 29 January – Natalie du Toit, amputee swimmer
- 2 February – Thembinkosi Fanteni, football player
- 17 February – AB de Villiers, cricketer
- 20 February – Trevor Noah, comedian, actor and television personality
- 26 February – Minki van der Westhuizen, model and television presenter
- 4 March – Jeremy Loops, singer
- 5 March – Lindani Nkosi, actor
- 7 March – Lonwabo Tsotsobe, cricketer
- 10 March – Ruan Pienaar, rugby player
- 23 March ‐ Lawrence Ndivhuwo Nedididi, football player
- 6 April – Siboniso Gaxa, football player
- 14 April – JP Duminy, cricketer
- 11 May – Willem Alberts, rugby player
- 20 May – Duduzane Zuma, businessman, son of the former President of South Africa, Jacob Zuma
- 22 May – Bismarck du Plessis, rugby player
- 6 June – Atandwa Kani, actor, son of actor John Kani
- 16 June – Zane Kirchner, rugby player
- 11 July – Morné Steyn, rugby player
- 13 July – Faf du Plessis, South Africa national cricket team captain
- 15 August – Peter Grant (rugby union), rugby player
- 28 August – Darian Townsend, swimmer, Olympic gold medalist
- 31 August – Charl Schwartzel, golfer
- 7 September – Letoya Makhene, singer & actress
- 25 September – Siphiwe Tshabalala, football player
- 1 October – Abigail Pietersen, figure skater
- 3 October – Thabo Nthethe, football player
- 6 October – Morné Morkel, cricketer
- 8 October – Tansey Coetzee, Miss South Africa 2007
- 14 October – Amalia Uys, actress
- 19 October – Presley Chweneyagae, actor, lead actor in the film Tsotsi, which won the Academy Award for Foreign Language Film at the 78th Academy Awards.
- 11 November – Kelly Khumalo, singer, actress and dancer
- 13 November – Victoria Blyth, Czech-South African singer
- 24 November – Kagisho Dikgacoi, football player
- 29 November – Katlego Mphela, football player
- 1 December – Yolandi Visser, rapper, female vocalist in the rap-rave group Die Antwoord
- 2 December – Sjava, singer, rapper, actor
- 27 December – Gail Mabalane, actress

== Deaths ==
- 20 March – John Fairbairn, naval officer, (b. 1912)
- 21 November – Princess Magogo, Zulu princess and musical artist, mother to Prince Mangosuthu Buthelezi and sister to Zulu King Solomon kaDinuzulu, (b. 1900)

== Railways ==
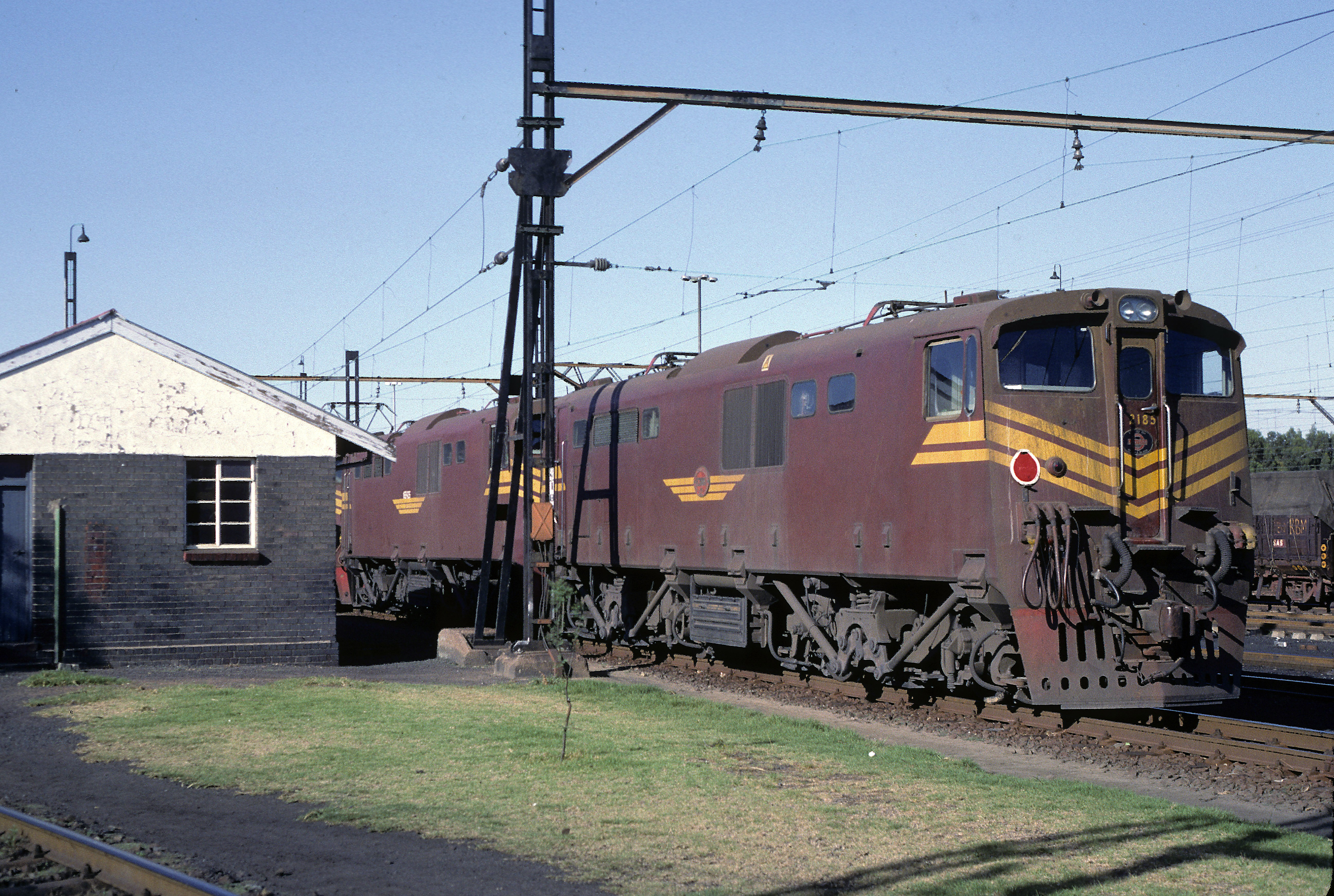
Class 6E1, Series 11 no. E2185

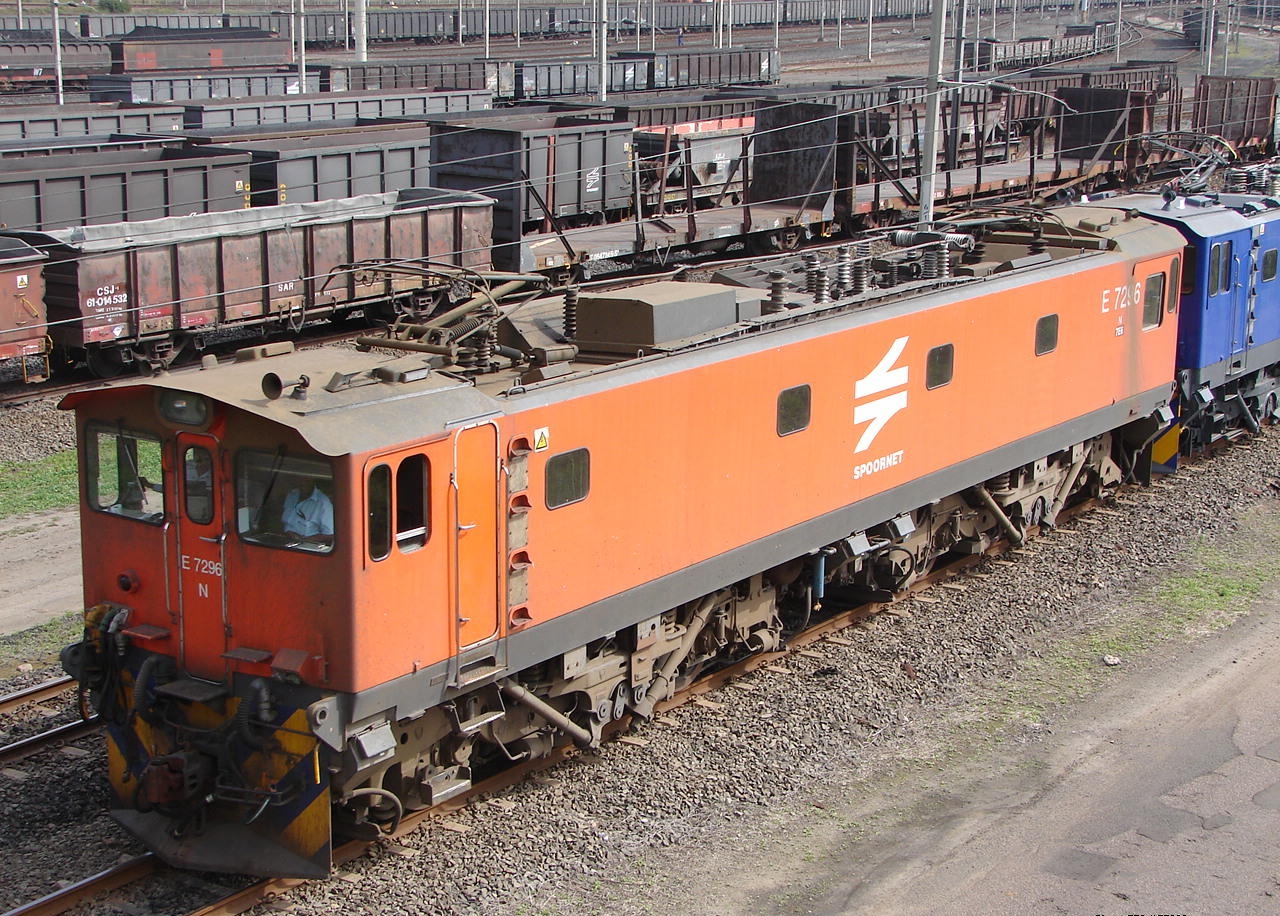
Class 7E3, Series 2

=== Locomotives ===
Two new Cape gauge locomotive types enter service on the South African Railways:

- The first of forty-five Class 6E1, Series 11 electric locomotives. These are the last of altogether 960 Class 6E1 locomotives to be built.
- The first of twenty-five 25 kV AC Class 7E3, Series 2 electric locomotives.

== Sports ==
=== Athletics ===
- 31 March – Ernest Seleke wins his first national title in the men's marathon, clocking 2:09:41 in Port Elizabeth.
- 11 August – Barefoot runner Zola Budd and Mary Decker of the United States collide in the Olympic 3,000 meters final and neither finish as medallist.

=== Motorsport ===
- 7 April – The South African Grand Prix takes place at Kyalami.
