= Warren Shankland =

South African cricketer (born 1987)

Warren Shankland (born 26 September 1987 in Johannesburg) is a South African cricketer who played for Gauteng.

Shankland played 10 First-class and 10 List A matches for Gauteng between 2008 and 2011.
