= Trans-Natal Colliery disaster =

1987 explosion in South Africa

An underground methane explosion occurred at the Trans-Natal Colliery near Ermelo in South Africa on 9 April 1987, killing 35 miners.
