= Thabo Nthethe =

South African footballer

Personal information
- Full name: Thabo Benett Nthethe
- Date of birth: 3 October 1984 (age 42)
- Place of birth: Bloemfontein, South Africa
- Height: 1.83 m (6 ft 0 in)
- Position: Central defender

Senior career*
| Years | Team | Apps | (Gls) |
| 2004–2014 | Bloemfontein Celtic | 194 | (7) |
| 2014–2018 | Mamelodi Sundowns | 79 | (5) |
| 2018 | Chippa United | 8 | (0) |
| 2019 | Baroka | 0 | (0) |
| 2019–2020 | TS Galaxy | 7 | (0) |

International career
| 2009–2014 | South Africa | 22 | (1) |
- * Club domestic league appearances and goals

Thabo Benett Nthethe (born 3 October 1984 in Bloemfontein) is a retired South African football defender. He represented South Africa and played for Mamelodi Sundowns and was the captain of Bloemfontein Celtic. In 2021 Nthethe was appointedas the new head coach of ABC Motsepe League side, Casric Bucs FC.

== International career ==
=== International goals ===
Scores and results list South Africa's goal tally first.

| # | Date | Venue | Opponent | Score | Result | Competition |
|---|---|---|---|---|---|---|
| 1 | 15 November 2013 | Somhlolo National Stadium, Swaziland | Swaziland | 3–0 | 3–0 | Friendly |

== Honours ==
Mameloni Sundowns

- CAF Champions League: 2016
