= South African Class 10E1, Series 1 =

Electric locomotive

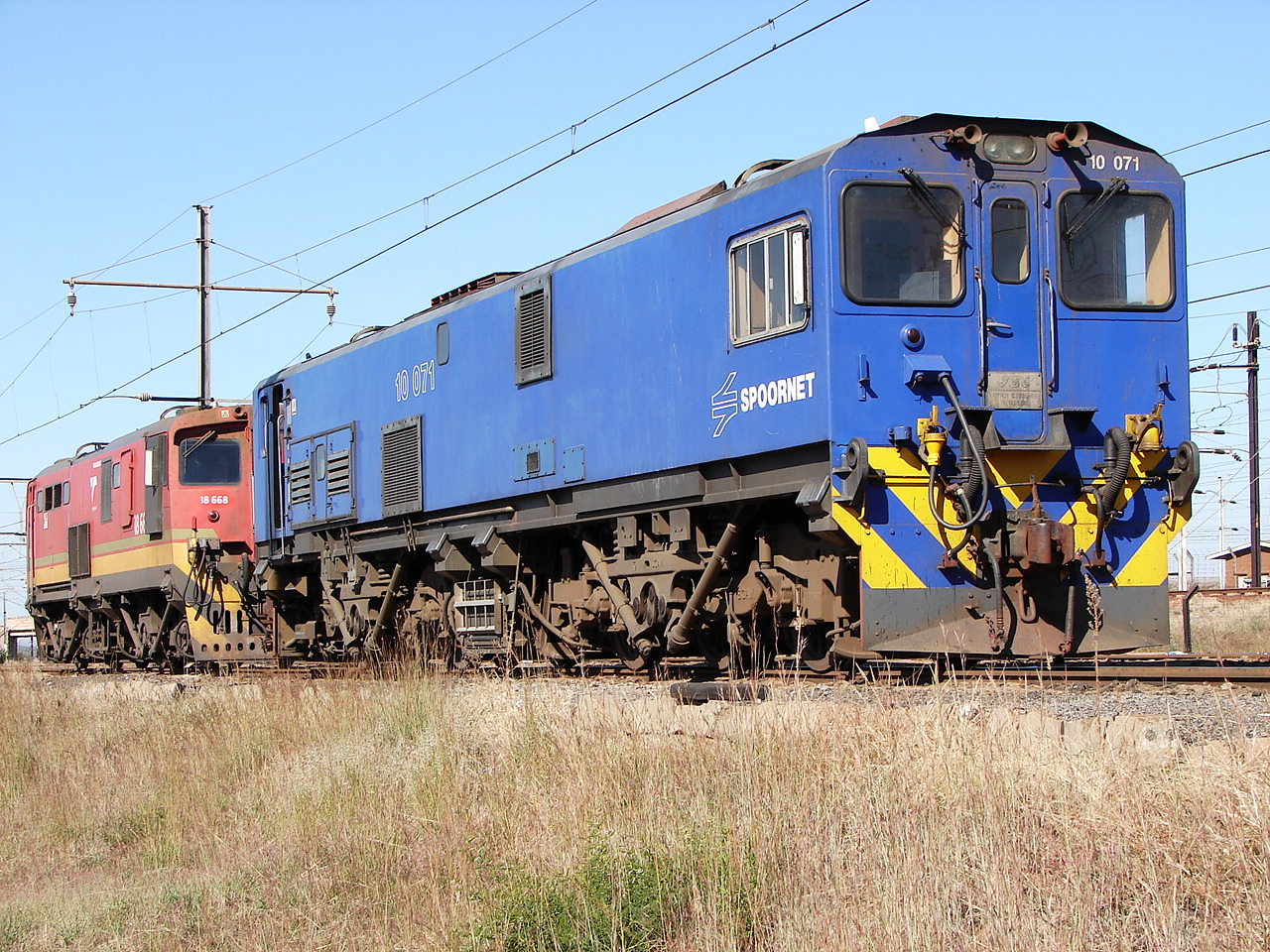
- 10-071 at Pyramid South, Pretoria, 7 May 2013
Type and origin
- Power type: Electric
- Designer: General Electric Company
- Builder: Union Carriage & Wagon
- Serial number: 5659-5708
- Model: GEC 10E1
- Build date: 1987-1989
- Total produced: 50
Specifications
- Configuration
  - AAR: C-C
  - UIC: Co'Co'
  - Commonwealth: Co-Co
- Gauge: 3 ft 6 in (1,067 mm) Cape gauge
- Wheel diameter: 1,220 mm (48.03 in)
- Wheelbase: 13,460 mm (44 ft 1 7/8 in)
  - Bogie: 4,060 mm (13 ft 3 7/8 in)
- Pivot centres: 10,200 mm (33 ft 5 5/8 in)
- Panto shoes: 12,000 mm (39 ft 4 1/2 in)
- Length
  - Over couplers: 18,520 mm (60 ft 9 1/8 in)
  - Over body: 17,506 mm (57 ft 5 1/4 in)
- Width: 2,906 mm (9 ft 6 3/8 in)
- Height
  - Pantograph: 4,120 mm (13 ft 6 1/4 in)
  - Body height: 3,945 mm (12 ft 11 3/8 in)
- Axle load: 21,210 kg (46,760 lb)
- Adhesive weight: 126,000 kg (278,000 lb)
- Loco weight: 126,000 kg (278,000 lb)
- Electric system/s: 3 kV DC catenary
- Current pickup: Pantographs
- Traction motors: Six GEC G425AZ
  - Rating 1 hour: 540 kW (720 hp)
  - Continuous: 515 kW (691 hp)
- Gear ratio: 17:87
- Loco brake: Air, Regenerative & Rheostatic
- Train brakes: Air & Vacuum
- Couplers: AAR knuckle
Performance figures
- Maximum speed: 90 km/h (56 mph)
- Power output
  - 1 hour: 3,240 kW (4,340 hp)
  - Continuous: 3,090 kW (4,140 hp)
- Tractive effort
  - Starting: 450 kN (100,000 lbf)
  - 1 hour: 335 kN (75,000 lbf)
  - Continuous: 310 kN (70,000 lbf) @ 35 km/h (22 mph)
- Brakeforce: 175 kN (39,000 lbf) @ 15–45 km/h (9–28 mph); 2,187 kN (492,000 lbf) @ 45–100 km/h (28–62 mph)
Career
- Operators: South African Railways; Spoornet; Transnet Freight Rail
- Class: Class 10E1
- Number in class: 50
- Numbers: 10-051 to 10-100
- Nicknames: Broodblik (Breadbin)
- Delivered: 1987-1989
- First run: 1987

The South African Railways Class 10E1, Series 1 of 1987 is an electric locomotive.

Between 1987 and 1989, the South African Railways placed fifty Class 10E1, Series 1 electric locomotives with a Co-Co wheel arrangement in mainline service as a new standard heavy goods locomotive.

== Manufacturer ==
The 3 kV DC Class 10E1, Series 1 electric locomotive was designed for the South African Railways (SAR) by the General Electric Company (GEC) and built by Union Carriage & Wagon (UCW) in Nigel, Transvaal. GEC supplied the electrical equipment while UCW was responsible for the mechanical components and assembly.

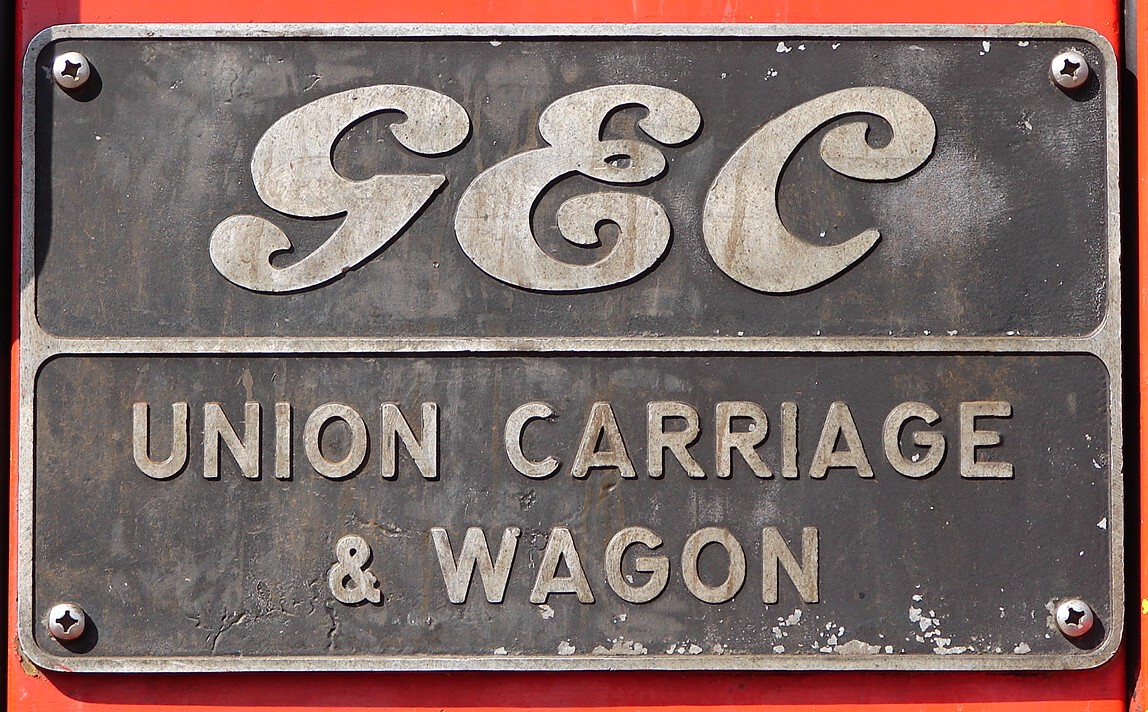

Fifty locomotives were delivered by UCW between 1987 and 1989, numbered in the range from 10-051 to 10-100. Contrary to prior UCW practice, GEC works numbers were allocated to the Class 10E1 locomotives. With the exception of the Class 9E, also a UCW-built GEC-designed locomotive, UCW did not allocate builder’s numbers to previous locomotives it built for the SAR, but used the SAR unit numbers for their record keeping.

== Characteristics ==
The Class 10E1 was introduced as a new standard 3 kV DC heavy goods locomotive. With a continuous power rating of 3,090 kilowatts (4,140 horsepower), four Class 10E1 locomotives were capable of performing the same work as six Class 6E1. The entire fleet of Class 10E1 electric locomotives uses electronic chopper control which is smoother in comparison to the rheostatic resistance control that was used in the Classes 1E to 6E1 range of electric locomotives.

=== Brakes ===
The locomotive makes use of either regenerative or rheostatic braking, as the situation demands. Both traction and electric braking power are continuously variable with the electric braking optimised to such an extent that maximum use will be made of the regenerative braking capacity of the 3 kV DC network, with the ability to automatically change over to rheostatic braking whenever the overhead supply system becomes non-receptive.

=== Bogies ===
The Class 10E1 was built with sophisticated traction linkages on the bogies. Together with the locomotive's electronic wheel-slip detection system, these traction struts, mounted between the linkages on the bogies and the locomotive body and colloquially referred to as grasshopper legs, ensure the maximum transfer of power to the rails without causing wheel-slip by reducing the adhesion of the leading bogie and increasing that of the trailing bogie by as much as 15% upon starting off.

=== Orientation ===
This dual cab locomotive has a roof access ladder on one side only, immediately to the right of the cab access door. The roof access ladder end is marked as the no. 2 end. In visual appearance, the Series 1 and Series 2 locomotives are virtually indistinguishable from each other. Their shape earned them the nickname broodblikke (breadbins) amongst train crews.

== Service ==
Most of the Class 10E1 locomotives were placed in service at Nelspruit and Ermelo in Mpumalanga. In 1998, a number of Spoornet’s electric locomotives and most of their Class 38-000 electro-diesel locomotives were sold to Maquarie-GETX (General Electric Financing) and leased back to Spoornet for a ten-year period which was to expire in 2008. Of the Class 10E, Series 1, numbers 10-062 to 10-100 were included in this leasing deal.

== Works numbers ==
The Class 10E1, Series 1 GEC works numbers are listed in the table.

Class 10E1, Series 1
| Loco no. | Works no. |
|---|---|
| 10-051 | 5659 |
| 10-052 | 5660 |
| 10-053 | 5661 |
| 10-054 | 5662 |
| 10-055 | 5663 |
| 10-056 | 5664 |
| 10-057 | 5665 |
| 10-058 | 5666 |
| 10-059 | 5667 |
| 10-060 | 5668 |
| 10-061 | 5669 |
| 10-062 | 5670 |
| 10-063 | 5671 |
| 10-064 | 5672 |
| 10-065 | 5673 |
| 10-066 | 5674 |
| 10-067 | 5675 |
| 10-068 | 5676 |
| 10-069 | 5677 |
| 10-070 | 5678 |
| 10-071 | 5679 |
| 10-072 | 5680 |
| 10-073 | 5681 |
| 10-074 | 5682 |
| 10-075 | 5683 |
| 10-076 | 5684 |
| 10-077 | 5685 |
| 10-078 | 5686 |
| 10-079 | 5687 |
| 10-080 | 5688 |
| 10-081 | 5689 |
| 10-082 | 5690 |
| 10-083 | 5691 |
| 10-084 | 5692 |
| 10-085 | 5693 |
| 10-086 | 5694 |
| 10-087 | 5695 |
| 10-088 | 5696 |
| 10-089 | 5697 |
| 10-090 | 5698 |
| 10-091 | 5699 |
| 10-092 | 5700 |
| 10-093 | 5701 |
| 10-094 | 5702 |
| 10-095 | 5703 |
| 10-096 | 5704 |
| 10-097 | 5705 |
| 10-098 | 5706 |
| 10-099 | 5707 |
| 10-100 | 5708 |

== Liveries ==
All the Class 10E1, Series 1 locomotives were delivered in the SAR red oxide livery with signal red buffer beams and cowcatchers and a yellow V stripe on the ends, folded over to a horizontal stripe below the side windows. The number plates on the sides were mounted without the traditional three-stripe yellow wings. In the late 1990s many were repainted in the Spoornet blue livery with outline numbers on the long hood sides and with a yellow and blue chevron pattern on the buffer beams and cowcatchers. After 2008 in the Transnet Freight Rail (TFR) era, several were repainted in the TFR red, green and yellow livery.

== Illustration ==
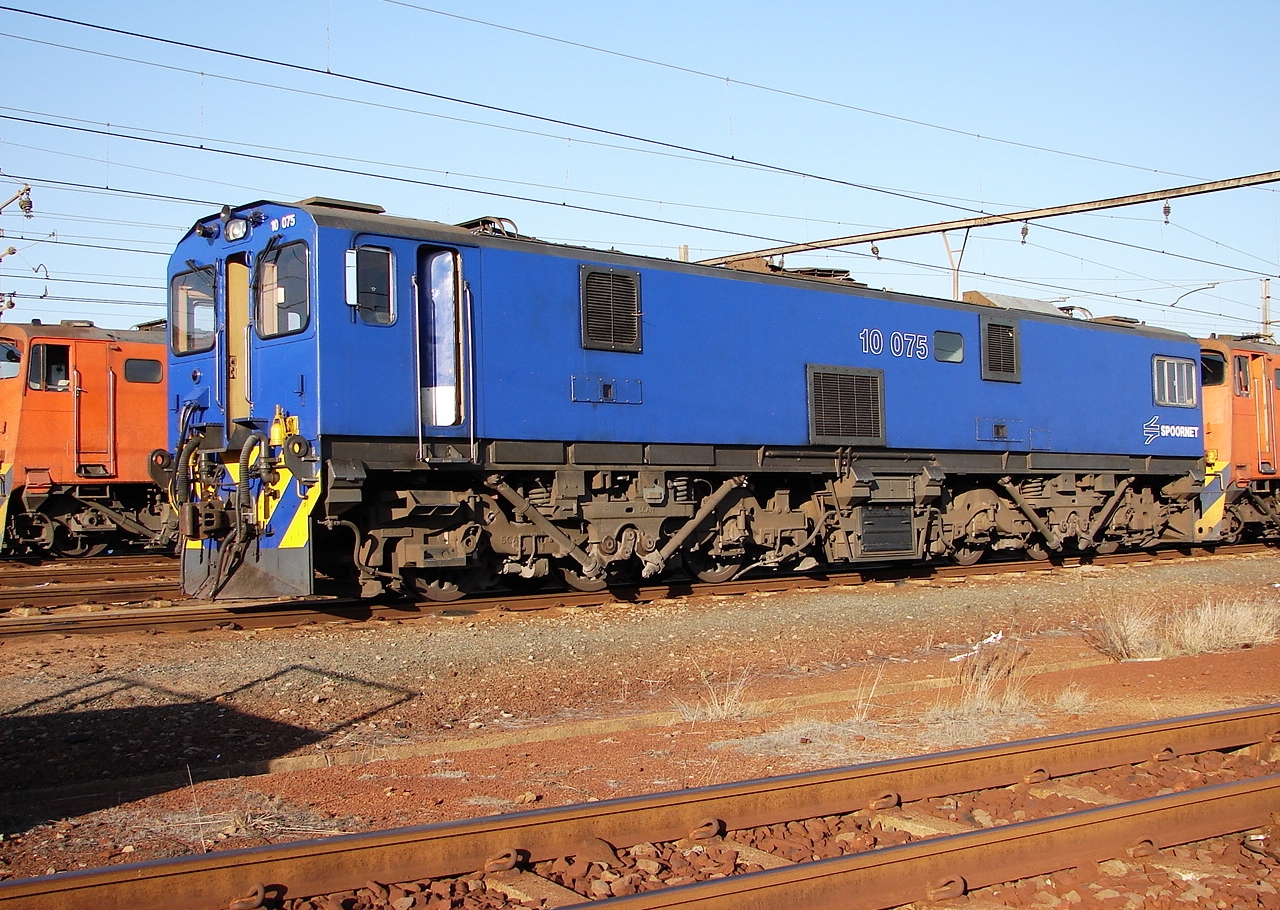
No. 10-075 in Spoornet blue livery with outline numbers, Sentrarand, Gauteng, 8 October 2009

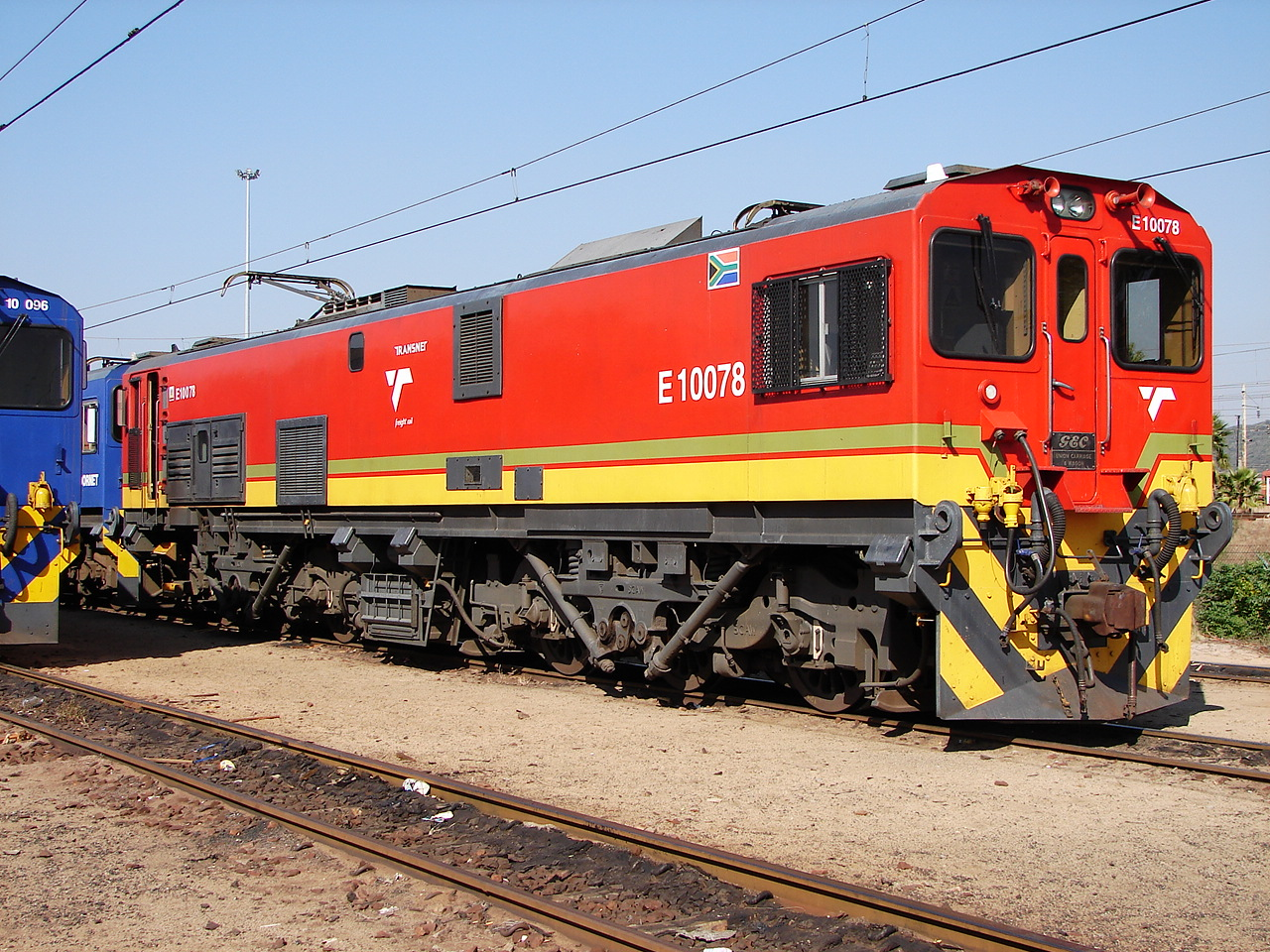
No. 10-078, now inscribed E10078, in Transnet Freight Rail livery at Pyramid South, Pretoria, 14 May 2013
