= South African Class 6E1, Series 11 =

Type of electric locomotive

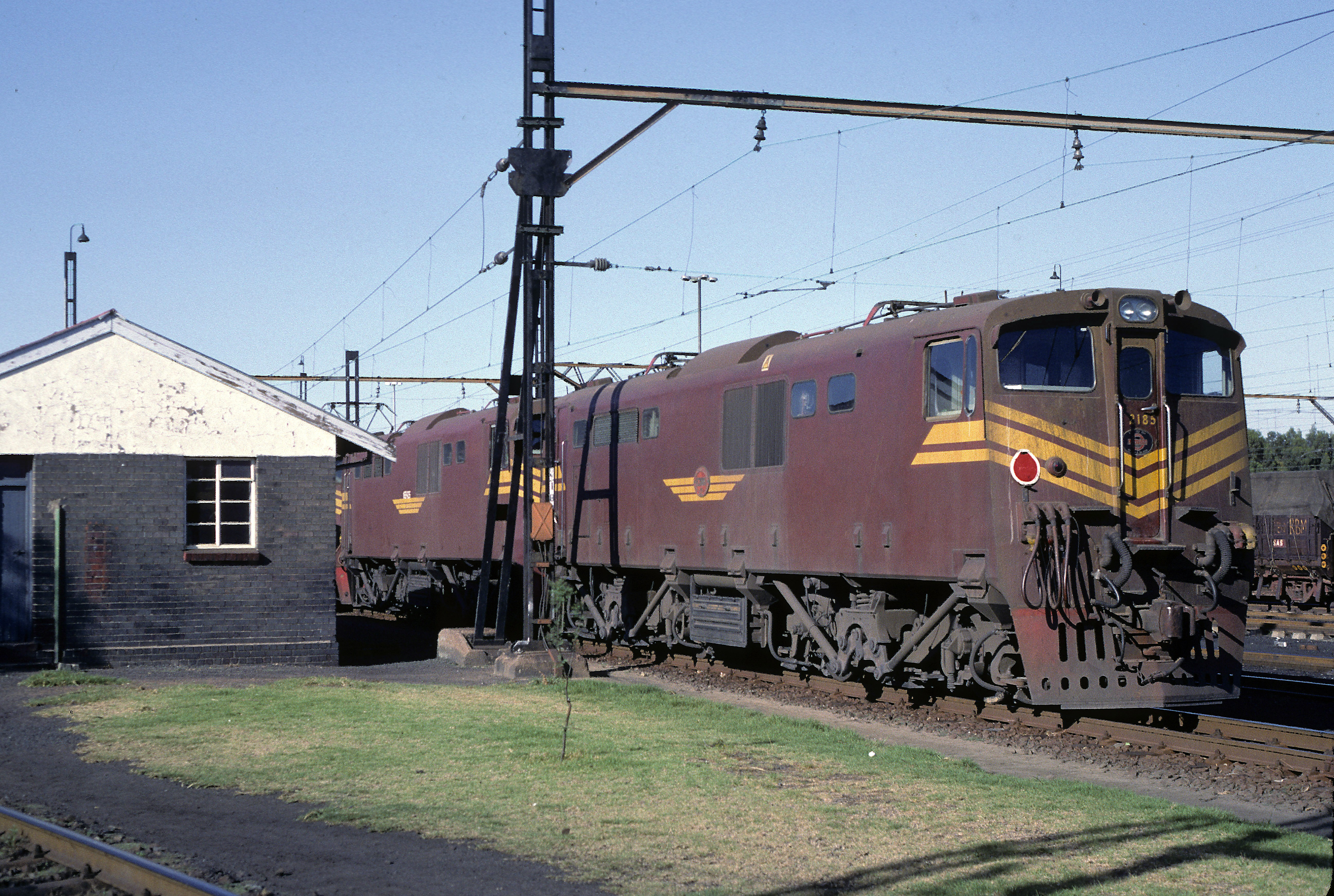
- E2185 at Witbank, Transvaal, 7 October 1991
Type and origin
- Power type: Electric
- Designer: Union Carriage & Wagon
- Builder: Union Carriage & Wagon
- Model: UCW 6E1
- Build date: 1984–1985
- Total produced: 45
- Rebuilder: Transnet Rail Engineering
- Rebuild date: 2001–2005
- Number rebuilt: 45 to Class 18E, Series 1
Specifications
- Configuration
  - AAR: B-B
  - UIC: Bo'Bo'
  - Commonwealth: Bo-Bo
- Gauge: 3 ft 6 in (1,067 mm) Cape gauge
- Wheel diameter: 1,220 mm (48.03 in)
- Wheelbase: 11,279 mm (37 ft 0 in)
  - Bogie: 3,430 mm (11 ft 3 in)
- Pivot centres: 7,849 mm (25 ft 9 in)
- Panto shoes: 6,972 mm (22 ft 10 1/2 in)
- Length
  - Over couplers: 15,494 mm (50 ft 10 in)
  - Over body: 14,631 mm (48 ft 0 in)
- Width: 2,896 mm (9 ft 6 in)
- Height
  - Pantograph: 4,089 mm (13 ft 5 in)
  - Body height: 3,937 mm (12 ft 11 in)
- Axle load: 22,447 kg (49,487 lb)
- Adhesive weight: 89,788 kg (197,949 lb)
- Loco weight: 89,788 kg (197,949 lb)
- Electric system/s: 3 kV DC catenary
- Current pickup(s): Pantographs
- Traction motors: Four AEI-283AY
  - Rating 1 hour: 623 kW (835 hp)
  - Continuous: 563 kW (755 hp)
- Gear ratio: 18:67
- Loco brake: Air & Regenerative
- Train brakes: Air & Vacuum
- Couplers: AAR knuckle
Performance figures
- Maximum speed: 113 km/h (70 mph)
- Power output
  - 1 hour: 2,492 kW (3,342 hp)
  - Continuous: 2,252 kW (3,020 hp)
- Tractive effort
  - Starting: 311 kN (70,000 lbf)
  - 1 hour: 221 kN (50,000 lbf)
  - Continuous: 193 kN (43,000 lbf) @ 40 km/h (25 mph)
Career
- Operators: South African Railways; Spoornet
- Class: Class 6E1
- Number in class: 45
- Numbers: E2141-E2185
- Delivered: 1984–1985
- First run: 1984
- Last run: 2005

The South African Railways Class 6E1, Series 11 of 1984 was an electric locomotive.

In 1984 and 1985, the South African Railways placed forty-five Class 6E1, Series 11 electric locomotives with a Bo-Bo wheel arrangement in mainline service.

== Manufacturer ==
The 3 kV DC Class 6E1, Series 11 electric locomotive was designed and built for the South African Railways (SAR) by Union Carriage & Wagon (UCW) in Nigel, Transvaal. The electrical equipment was supplied by the General Electric Company (GEC).

Forty-five locomotives were delivered in 1984 and 1985, numbered in the range from E2141 to E2185. These were the last Class 6E1 locomotives to be built. Like Series 6 to 10, the Series 11 units were equipped with AEI-283AY traction motors. UCW did not allocate builder's numbers to the locomotives it built for the SAR, but used the SAR unit numbers for their record keeping.

== Characteristics ==
=== Orientation ===
These dual cab locomotives had a roof access ladder on one side only, just to the right of the cab access door. The roof access ladder end was marked as the no. 2 end. A corridor along the centre of the unit connected the cabs which were identical apart from the fact that the handbrake was located in cab 2. A pantograph hook stick was stowed in a tube mounted below the lower edge of the locomotive body on the roof access ladder side. The locomotive had one square and two rectangular access panels along the lower half of the body and a large hatch door on the roof access ladder side, and only one square access panel and a large hatch door on the opposite side.

=== Series identifying features ===
The Class 6E1 was produced in eleven series over a period of nearly sixteen years. While some of the Class 6E1 series are visually indistinguishable from their predecessors or successors, some externally visible changes did occur over the years.

Series 8 and later locomotives could be distinguished from all older models by the large hatch door on each side, below the second small window to the right of the side door on the roof access ladder side and below the first window immediately to the right of the door on the other side.

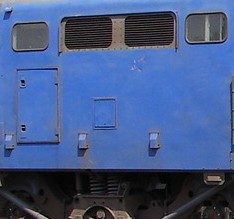
Drainage holes on Series 9 to 11

The Series 9 to Series 11 locomotives were visually indistinguishable from each other, but could be distinguished from all earlier models by the rainwater drainage holes on their lower sides. These holes were usually covered by so-called buckets, but the covers were absent on several locomotives. Another distinction was the end doors which were recessed into the doorframes on Series 9 to Series 11 locomotives, compared to earlier models which had their end doors flush with the doorframes. In addition, on Series 9 and later models the split side window on the driver's assistant side was replaced by a single rectangular side window with rounded corners. Finally, unlike all earlier models, all four doors on Series 9 to Series 11 locomotives had rounded corners.

=== Crew access ===
The Class 5E, 5E1, 6E and earlier 6E1 locomotives were notoriously difficult to enter from ground level since their lever-style door handles were at waist level when standing inside the cab. This made it impossible to open the door from outside without first climbing up high enough to reach the door handle while hanging on to the side handrails with one hand only. Crews therefore often chose to leave the doors ajar when parking and exiting the locomotives.

Side doors with two interconnected latch handles on the outside, such as those which were introduced on the Class 7E1 with one outside handle mounted near floor level and the other at mid-door level, were also introduced on Class 6E1 locomotives, beginning with Series 9.

== Service ==
The Class 6E1 family saw service all over both 3 kV DC mainline and branch line networks, the smaller Cape Western mainline between Cape Town and Beaufort West and the larger network which covers portions of the Northern Cape, the Free State, Natal, Gauteng, North West and Mpumalanga.

== Rebuilding to Class 18E ==
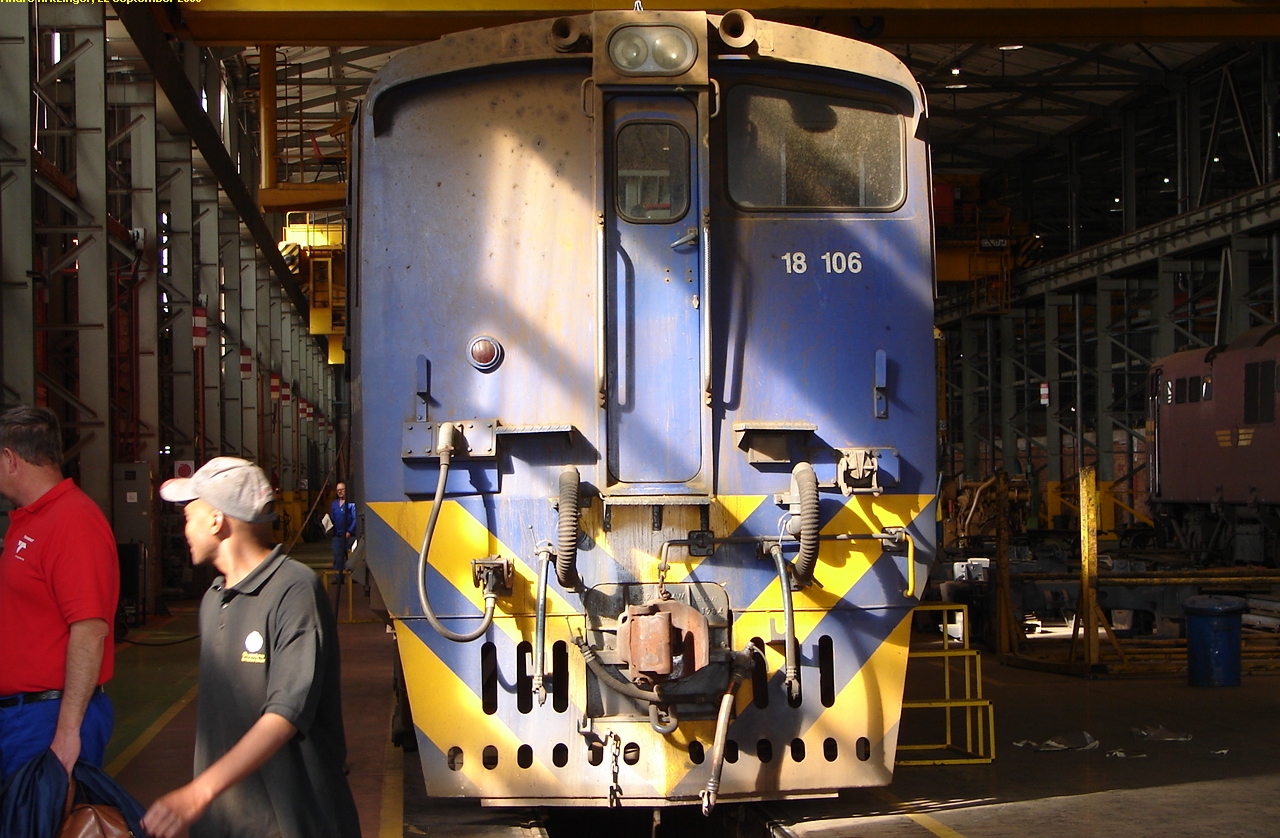
Cab 1 of Class 18E no. 18-106, ex Class 6E1 no. E2174, Sentrarand, 22 September 2009

In 2000 Spoornet began a project to rebuild Series 2 to 11 Class 6E1 locomotives to Class 18E, Series 1 and Series 2 at the Transnet Rail Engineering (TRE) workshops at Koedoespoort. In the process the cab at the no. 1 end was stripped of all controls and the driver's front and side windows were blanked off to have a toilet installed, thereby forfeiting the locomotive's bi-directional ability.

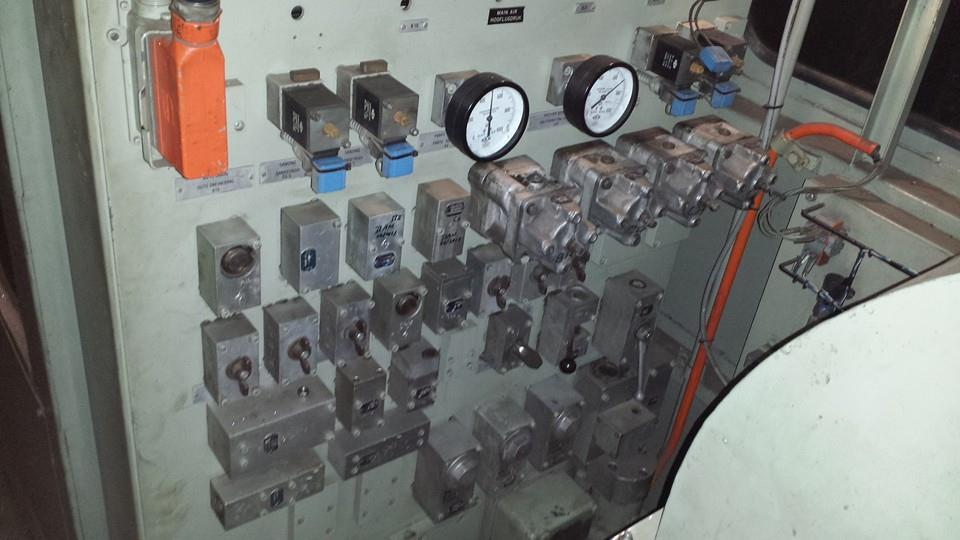
Brake rack in Class 18E no. 18-089

Since the driving cab's noise level had to be below 85 decibels, cab 2 was selected as the Class 18E driving cab primarily based on its lower noise level compared to cab 1, which was closer and more exposed to the compressor's noise and vibration. Another factor was the closer proximity of cab 2 to the low voltage switch panel. The fact that the handbrake was located in cab 2 was not a deciding factor, but was considered an additional benefit.

While the earlier Class 6E1, Series 2 to 7 locomotives had been built with a brake system which consisted of various valves connected to each other with pipes, commonly referred to as a "bicycle frame" brake system, the Class 6E1, Series 8 to 11 locomotives were built with an air-operated equipment frame brake system, commonly referred to as a brake rack. Since the design of the rebuilt Class 18E locomotives included the same brake rack, the rebuilding project was begun with the newer series 8 to 11 locomotives to reduce the overall cost of rebuilding.

The Class 6E1, Series 11 locomotives which were used in this project were all rebuilt to Class 18E, Series 1 locomotives. All forty-five Series 11 locomotives were rebuilt by April 2005. The numbers and renumbering details of the rebuilt units are listed in the table.

Class 6E1, Series 11 units rebuilt to Class 18E
Count	6E1 no.	Year built	18E no.	18E series	Year rebuilt	Notes
1	E2141	1984	18-117	1	2004	
2	E2142	1984	18-111	1	2004	
3	E2143	1984	18-154	1	2004	
4	E2144	1984	18-005	1	2001	
5	E2145	1984	18-148	1	2004	
6	E2146	1984	18-116	1	2004	
7	E2147	1984	18-136	1	2004	
8	E2148	1984	18-145	1	2004	
9	E2149	1984	18-068	1	2002	
10	E2150	1984	18-003	1	2001	
11	E2151	1984	18-119	1	2004	
12	E2152	1984	18-091	1	2003	
13	E2153	1984	18-075	1	2003	
14	E2154	1984	18-092	1	2003	
15	E2155	1984	18-105	1	2003	
16	E2156	1984	18-125	1	2004	
17	E2157	1984	18-031	1	2002	
18	E2158	1984	18-101	1	2003	
19	E2159	1984	18-162	1	2005	
20	E2160	1984	18-150	1	2004	
21	E2161	1984	18-152	1	2004	
22	E2162	1984	18-071	1	2003	
23	E2163	1984	18-095	1	2003	
24	E2164	1984	18-112	1	2004	
25	E2165	1985	18-038	1	2002	
26	E2166	1985	18-007	1	2001	
27	E2167	1985	18-017	1	2002	
28	E2168	1985	18-171	1	2005	
29	E2169	1985	18-173	1	2005	
30	E2170	1985	18-110	1	2004	
31	E2171	1985	18-168	1	2004	
32	E2172	1985	18-129	1	2004	
33	E2173	1985	18-109	1	2004	
34	E2174	1985	18-106	1	2003	
35	E2175	1985	18-098	1	2003	
36	E2176	1985	18-120	1	2004	
37	E2177	1985	18-172	1	2005	
38	E2178	1985	18-140	1	2004	
39	E2179	1985	18-170	1	2005	
40	E2180	1985	18-048	1	2002	
41	E2181	1985	18-157	1	2004	
42	E2182	1985	18-118	1	2004	
43	E2183	1985	18-066	1	2003	
44	E2184	1985	18-083	1	2003	
45	E2185	1985	18-146	1	2004	

== Liveries ==
All the Class 6E1, Series 11 locomotives were delivered in the SAR red oxide livery with signal red cowcatchers, yellow whiskers and with the number plates on the sides mounted on three-stripe yellow wings.
