= 1982 in South Africa =

- Decades: 1960s; 1970s; 1980s; 1990s; 2000s
- See also: List of years in South Africa

The following lists events that happened during 1982 in South Africa.

== Incumbents ==
- State President: Marais Viljoen.
- Prime Minister: P.W. Botha.
- Chief Justice: Frans Lourens Herman Rumpff then Pieter Jacobus Rabie.

== Events ==
January

- 7 – A bomb damages the office of the West Rand Administration Board in Soweto.
- 8 – Umkhonto we Sizwe guerrillas attack Koeberg nuclear power plant in Cape Town.
- 11 – The United Nations Special Committee against Apartheid launches the International Year of Mobilisation for Sanctions against South Africa.

February

- 15 – Four COSAS-Members are bombed by the Security Branch under orders of Brigadier Schoon at a mine dump outside Kagiso. Three die and one is injured.
- 18 – The South African Navy frigate SAS President Kruger sinks with the loss of 16 lives after colliding with SAS Tafelberg.
- 24 – Andries Treurnicht and another 22 National Party MPs vote for no confidence in Prime Minister P.W. Botha.
- South Africa and Swaziland sign a non-aggression pact.

March

- 6 – F.W. de Klerk replaces Andries Treurnicht as leader of the National Party in the Transvaal.
- 9-14 – The South African Defence Force's Operation Super takes place.
- 14 – A bomb explodes at the African National Congress headquarters in London.
- 20 – A bomb explodes at the Langa Commissioners Court.

April

- 30 – Prime Minister P.W. Botha and President of Zambia Kenneth Kaunda meet on the Botswana border to discuss the political situation in South West Africa and South Africa.

May

- 12 – A bomb damages the office of the West Rand Administration Board in Soweto for the second time.
- 21 – A bomb explodes at the offices of the Department of Coloured Affairs in Pinetown near Durban.
- 28 – A fuel depot and power transformer in Hectorspruit is damaged by a limpet mine.

June

- 3 – A bomb damages the railway near Dube in Soweto.
- 4 – One person is killed when a bomb explodes in a lift at the offices of the Presidents Council in Cape Town.
- 28 – The railway depot at Vryheid is damaged in an explosion.
- 28 – In Scheepersnek, two bombs cause extensive damage to the railway depot, pump station, stores and vehicles.
- 28 – The Durban-Witwatersrand oil pipeline is damaged by a bomb.

July

- In Port Elizabeth the police station commander's office and New Law Courts are damaged in an attack.

August

- 28 – The Umvoti Mounted Rifles base in Red Hill, Durban is attacked.

September

- 24 – Umkhonto we Sizwe places explosives on a railway bridge near Upington that fails to detonate.
- Two insurgents are killed by police in Boksburg.

October

- 26 – Three bombs explode at the Drakensberg Administration offices in Pietermaritzburg.
- A special branch policeman and an insurgent are killed in a skirmish in KwaZulu-Natal.

November

- 8 – A bomb causes severe damage at the Mobil fuel storage depot in Mkuze.
- 20-21 – Umkhonto we Sizwe uses RPG-7s to attack a rural police station and temporary South African Army garrison at Tonga.

December

- 10 – The South African Defence Force stages a pre-dawn raid on houses inhabited by African National Congress in Maseru, Lesotho.
- 16 – The United Freedom Front bombs offices of South African Airways in Elmont, NY and IBM in Harrison, NY.
- 18-19 – Four explosions cause massive damage at the Koeberg nuclear power station just north of Cape Town.
- 31 – A bomb damages the Johannesburg Magistrates court 200m from John Vorster Square.
- One person is killed and 70 injured in a bomb blast at the Southern Free State Administration Board in Bloemfontein.

Unknown date

- Bulelani Ngcuka is jailed for three years for refusing to give evidence in the political trial of Patrick Maqubele and others.

Brighter version of the 1928 South African flag used from 1982 to 1994

- South Africa adopts a brighter version of the 1928 flag.

== Births ==
- 2 January – Ricky Januarie, rugby player.
- 8 March – Brett Evans, football player.
- 17 March – Steven Pienaar, football player.
- 18 March – Sisanda Henna, producer, director, and actor.
- 24 March – Fourie du Preez, rugby player.
- 2 May – Johan Botha (cricketer), cricketer.
- 18 May – Katlego Mashego, football player.
- 11 June – Chere Burger, dressage rider.
- 9 June – Reneilwe Letsholonyane, football player.
- 25 July – Monde Zondeki, cricketer
- 27 August – Khuli Chana, Motswako rapper.
- 6 October – Gio Aplon, rugby player.
- 19 October – Louis Oosthuizen, golfer.
- 21 October – Thapelo Mokoena, actor.
- 16 November
  - Anke Pietrangeli, singer.
  - Jannie du Plessis, rugby player.
- 9 December – Lee-Ann Liebenberg, model. She is notable as 2005 FHM-South Africa's Sexiest Woman In the World.
- 22 December – Teko Modise, football player.

== Deaths ==
- 5 February – Neil Aggett, trade unionist and activist. (b. 1953)
- 29 March – H. Selby Msimang, journalist and activist. (b. 1886)
- 16 July – Charles Robberts Swart, last Governor-General and first State President. (b. 1894)
- 17 August – Ruth First, anti-apartheid activist and scholar. (b. 1925)
- 20 August – Walter Battiss, artist. (b. 1906)

== Railways ==
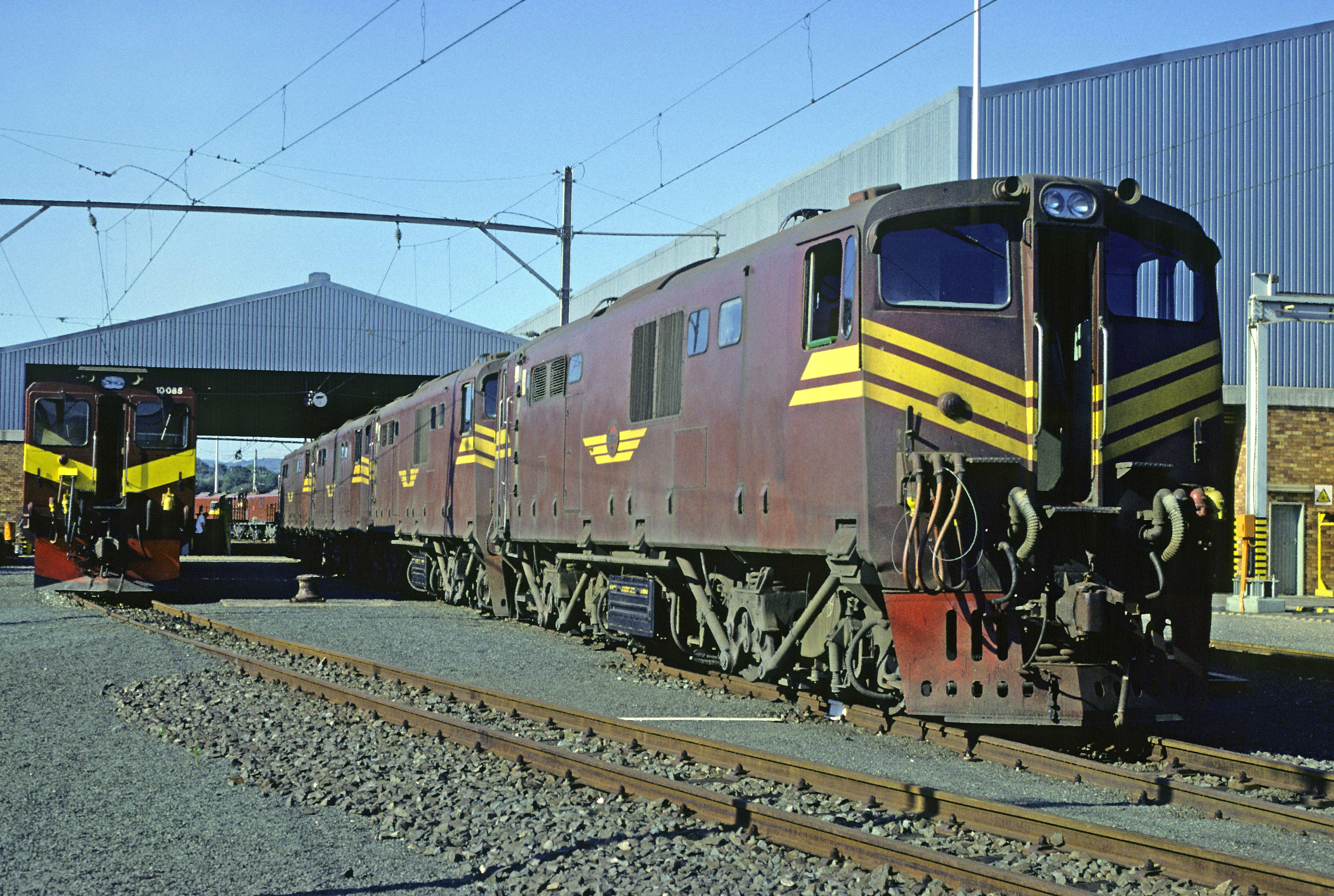
Class 6E1, Series 10

=== Locomotives ===
Three new Cape gauge locomotive types enter service on the South African Railways:

- The first of fifty-five Class 6E1, Series 10 electric locomotives.
- Twenty-five 25 kV AC Class 7E2, Series 1 electric locomotives.
- The first of six Class 9E, Series 2 General Electric Company 50 kV AC electric locomotives on the Sishen-Saldanha iron ore line.

== Sports ==
=== Athletics ===
- 16 October – Gabashane Rakabaele wins his third national title in the men's marathon in Durban.

=== Motorsport ===
- 23 January – The South African Grand Prix takes place at Kyalami.
