= 1978 in South Africa =

- Decades: 1950s; 1960s; 1970s; 1980s; 1990s
- See also: List of years in South Africa

The following lists events that happened during 1978 in South Africa.

== Incumbents ==
- State President:
  - Nico Diederichs (until 21 August).
  - Marais Viljoen (acting from 21 August until 9 October).
  - John Vorster (from 10 October).
- Prime Minister:
  - John Vorster (until 2 October).
  - P.W. Botha (from 9 October).
- Chief Justice: Frans Lourens Herman Rumpff.

== Events ==
January

- Former African National Congress member Steve Mtshali, state witness in various trials, is shot and wounded.

February

- 2 – Guerrillas attack the Daveyton police station.
- 2 – Kaiser Matanzima breaks all diplomatic ties with South Africa and announces that all South African Defence Force members seconded to the Transkei Army will leave Transkei by 31 March.
- 2 – The Eastern Cape Attorney-General refuses to prosecute policemen involved in the arrest and detention of Steve Biko.
- A bomb capable of destroying a 22-storey building is found in a Johannesburg office block and defused.

March

- 10 – A bomb explodes outside the offices of the Bantu Affairs building in Port Elizabeth, killing one civilian.

April

- 14 – Abel Mthembu, former deputy president of the ANC in the Transvaal, turns state witness at the Pretoria ANC trial.

May

- 4 – The South African Defence Force launches an airborne attack on Cassinga in Angola during Operation Reindeer.
- 4 – Azanian People's Organisation members Ishmael Mkhabela and Lybon Mabasa are arrested in Soweto.

August

- 21 – Marais Viljoen becomes acting State President of South Africa.
- 23 – Operation Saffraan, a South African Defence Force retaliatory raid, is carried out in Zambia.

September

- The African National Congress attempts to kill about 500 of its own cadres by poisoning their food because an infiltrated enemy agent could not be identified.

October

- 9 – P.W. Botha succeeds John Vorster as Prime Minister of South Africa.
- 10 – John Vorster becomes State President of South Africa.
- 31 – The South African Railways sets a still unbeaten world rail speed record.

December

- A bomb explodes at the Soweto Community Council offices.

Unknown date

- The South African Defence Force attacks several SWAPO bases in Angola during Operation Bruilof.
- The SADF's 32 Battalion moves into southern Angola to flush out SWAPO members during Operation Seiljag.
- George Bizos becomes a senior member of the Johannesburg Bar.
- The Atomic Energy Corporation builds South Africa's first nuclear weapon device.
- South Korea ends diplomatic relations with South Africa it established in 1961, in protest of apartheid.

== Births ==
- 16 January – Judi van Niekerk, synchronised swimmer
- 23 February – Siyabonga Shibe, actor
- 24 February – Bolla Conradie, rugby player
- 28 February – Rowen Fernández, football player
- 22 March – Heinz Winckler, singer, winner of Idols South Africa (season 1)
- 27 March – Professor (musician), recording artist
- 30 March – Bok van Blerk, singer-songwriter
- 3 April – John Smit, Springboks, rugby captain
- 6 April – Jaco van der Westhuyzen, Springbok rugby player
- 6 May – Danie Rossouw, Jaco van der Westhuyzen
- 8 May – Nkhensani Kubayi-Ngubane, national minister
- 7 June – DuPreez Strauss, music director, TV, theatre and radio producer, composer, lyricist, writer, casting director, orchestra conductor and TV personality
- 25 June – De Wet Barry, Springbok rugby player
- 30 June – Stella Ndabeni-Abrahams, national minister
- 8 August – Lawrence Sephaka, Springbok rugby player
- 10 August – Karen Zoid, singer
- 23 October – Wayne Julies, Springbok rugby player
- 7 November – Katlego Danke, actress
- 20 November – Neil de Kock, Springbok rugby player
- 18 December – Lulu Dikana, singer, older sister of singer Zonke (d. 2014)
- 29 December – André Pretorius, Springbok rugby player

== Deaths ==
- 8 January – Rick Turner, activist and academic. (b. 1941)
- 12 January – Monty Naicker, medical doctor and activist. (b. 1910)
- 27 February – Robert Sobukwe, political activist. (b. 1924)
- 6 July – Papwa Sewgolum, golfer. (b. 1930)
- 21 August – Nico Diederichs, State President of South Africa. (b. 1903)

== Railways ==
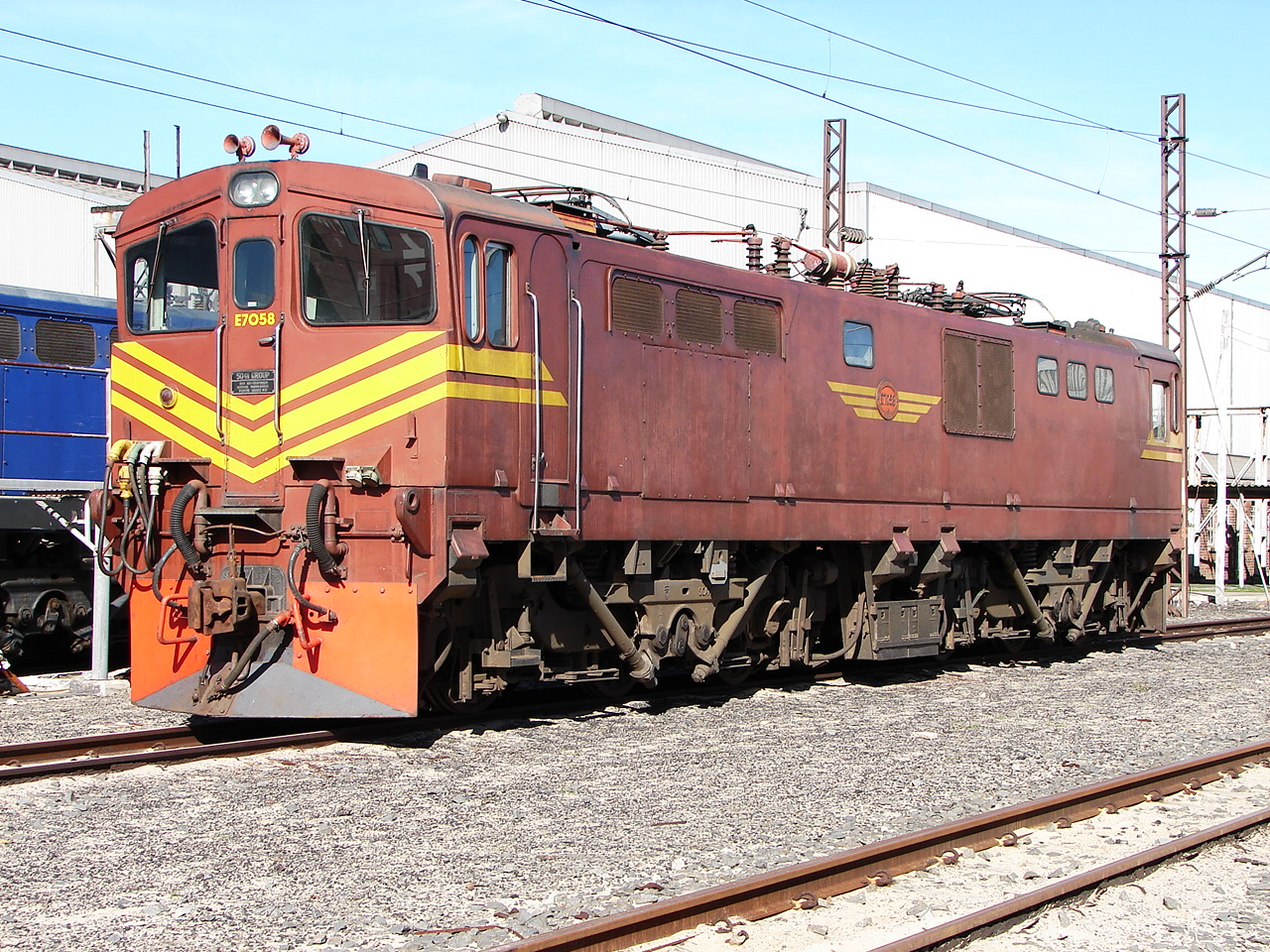
Class 7E

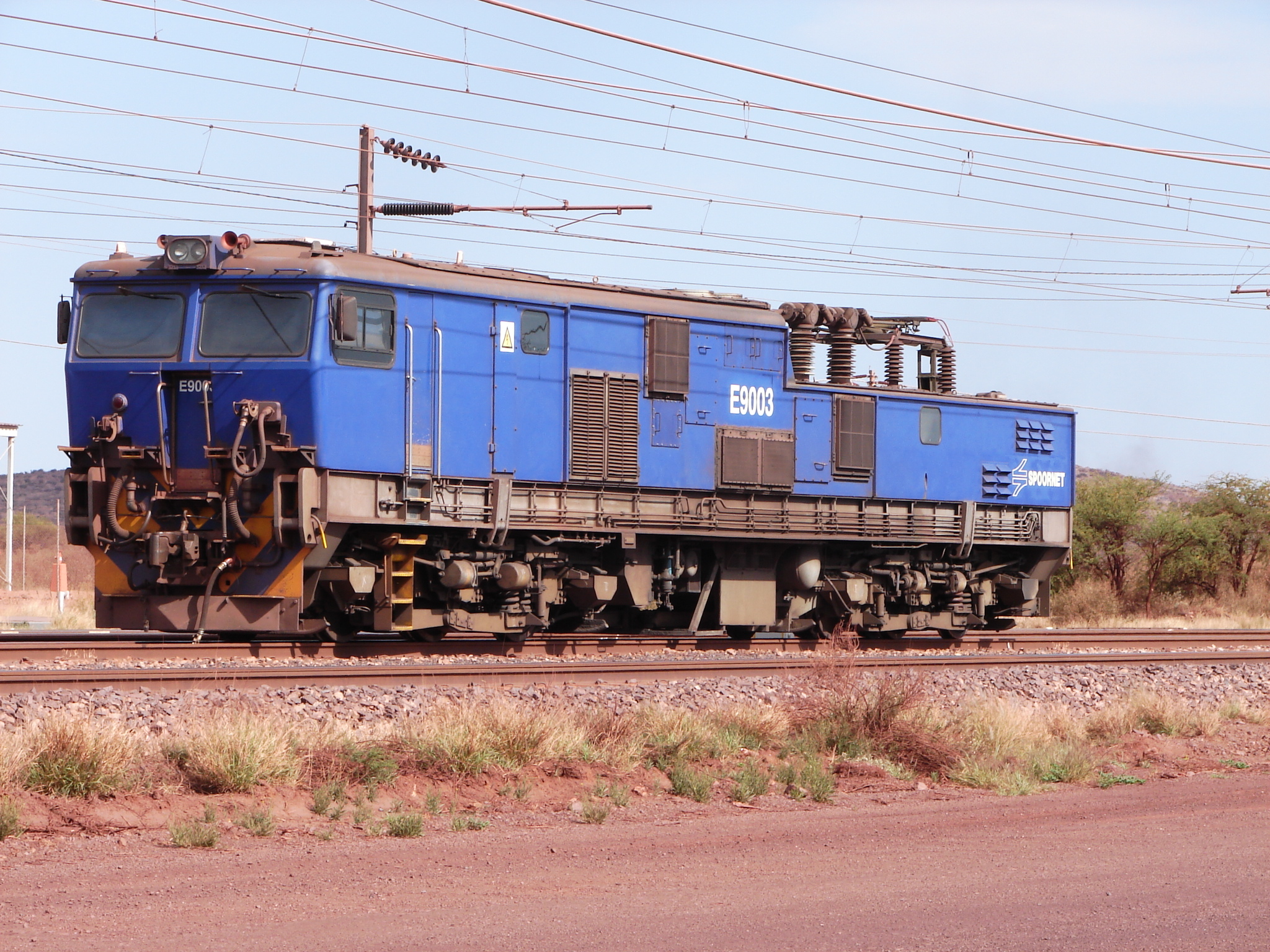
Class 9E, Series 1

=== Locomotives ===
- Three new Cape gauge locomotive types enter service on the South African Railways:
  - August – The first of 58 Class 34-800 General Motors Electro-Motive Division type GT26MC diesel-electric locomotives.
  - The first of one hundred Class 7E electric locomotives, the SAR's first 25 kV AC locomotive.
  - The first of twenty-five Class 9E, Series 1 electric locomotives, the SAR's first 50 kV AC locomotive, on the Sishen-Saldanha iron ore line.
- 31 October – SAR Class 6E1, Series 4 locomotive no. E1525 reaches a speed of 245 kilometres per hour (152 miles per hour) on a stretch of track between Westonaria and Midway, a still unbeaten world rail speed record on 3 feet 6 inches (1,067 millimetres) Cape gauge track.
- The SAR rebuilds Class 6E1, Series 5 no. E1600, a 3 kV DC electric locomotive, as a test-bed for use during 25 kV AC electrification.

== Sports ==
=== Motorsport ===
- 4 March – The South African Grand Prix takes place at Kyalami.
