= 1981 in South Africa =

- Decades: 1960s; 1970s; 1980s; 1990s; 2000s
- See also: List of years in South Africa

The following lists events that happened during 1981 in South Africa.

== Incumbents ==
- State President: Marais Viljoen.
- Prime Minister: P.W. Botha.
- Chief Justice: Frans Lourens Herman Rumpff.

== Events ==
January

- 25 – The largest part of the town Laingsburg is swept away within minutes by one of the strongest floods ever experienced in the Great Karoo.
- 30 – The South African Defence Force launches Operation Beanbag and raids a suspected Umkhonto we Sizwe safe area in the suburb of Matola, Maputo, Mozambique, killing 12 to 24 people. The numbers reported killed vary.

February

- 9 – Tuks FM (107.2FM), the University of Pretoria's campus radio station, is established.
- Two people are injured when a bomb explodes in a Durban shopping centre.

April

- 1 – The South African Railways and Harbours changes its name to the South African Transport Services.
- 14 – A section of railway line between Richards Bay and Vryheid is destroyed by Umkhonto we Sizwe and coal trucks are derailed.
- 16 – Bishop Desmond Tutu is arrested and his passport is confiscated.
- 21 – Limpet mines explode and destroy two transformers at a sub-station in Durban.

May

- 6 – The railway in the Hoedspruit area is damaged.
- 14 – The United Nations General Assembly publishes a blacklist of 65 multi-national companies and some 270 sports persons who have links with South Africa.
- 21 – A bomb explodes and damages the Port Elizabeth rail link to Johannesburg and Cape Town.
- 25 – A pamphlet bomb explodes in Durban.
- 25 – The Fort Jackson Police station is attacked.
- 25 – The railway line near Soweto is damaged.
- 25 – The railway line on the Natal South Coast is damaged.
- 25 – Power lines are cut in Vrede.
- 25 – A series of terrorist actions in support of Republic Day protests are admitted by Umkhonto we Sizwe.
- 27 – A bomb explodes in Durban destroying a South African Defence Force recruiting building.

June

- 1 – Three offices of the Progressive Federal Party are firebombed in Johannesburg, with no injuries.
- 4 – The police station in Meyerton is attacked by terrorists.
- 11 – The railway line on the Natal North coast is maliciously damaged.
- 16 – The railway line near East London is maliciously damaged.
- 26 – Two bombs explode at the Durban Cenotaph.
- 28 – The railway near Empangeni is maliciously damaged.
- 30 – Zwelakhe Sisulu, President of the Black Media Workers Association of South Africa, is arrested under the Internal Security Act.

July

- 3 – A limpet mine is found at the fuel storage yard in Alberton and defused.
- 21 – Six bomb explosions at sub-stations in Pretoria, Middelburg, and Ermelo disrupt power supply.
- 26 – Two bombs explode at 05:50 and 06:10 in central Durban. Three people are injured and extensive damage is caused to motor vehicle firms.

August

- 6 – A bomb explodes in an East London shopping complex minutes before rush hour.
- 8 – A bomb explodes in a Port Elizabeth shopping centre in similar manner to the East London bomb.
- 11 – The Voortrekkerhoogte Military Base outside Pretoria is attacked with RPG-7s. Two British citizens, Nicolas Heath and Bonnie Lou Muller, are identified as accomplices in the assault.
- 19 – The railway line near East London is maliciously damaged.
- 23 – The South African Defence Force attacks South-West Africa People's Organisation bases in Xangongo and Ongiva, southern Angola during Operation Protea.

September

- 2 – Two policemen and two civilians, one a child, are killed during an attack on Mabopane Police station.
- 12 – A bomb damages the main railway line at Delville Wood near Durban.

October

- 10 – Umkhonto we Sizwe attacks government offices of the Department of Co-operation and Development. Four civilians are injured.
- 21 – Umkhonto we Sizwe destroys a transformer in Evander and a water pipeline feeding Sasol III (Secunda CTL) in Secunda.
- 26 – Two policemen are killed during an attack on Sibasa Police station.

November

- 1 – The Jeppes Reef House near the Swaziland border, occupied by the South African Defence Force, comes under RPG-7 attack.
- 1 – The South African Defence Force attacks South-West Africa People's Organisation bases in Chitequeta, south-eastern Angola, during Operation Daisy.
- 9 – A bomb explodes at the Orlando Magistrates Court in Soweto.
- 12 – Rosslyn sub-station in Pretoria is damaged by 4 limpet mines.
- 19 – Griffiths Mxenge, lawyer and activist is assassinated by the apartheid death squad.
- 27 – Cedric Mayson, a former Methodist minister, is arrested.

December

- 4 – South Africa grants Ciskei independence.
- 9 – The offices of the Chief Commissioner of the Department of Co-operation and Development in Cape Town is attacked.
- 14 – A Pretoria sub-station is bombed.
- 23 – Eastern Cape provincial buildings in Duncan Village are damaged in an Umkhonto we Sizwe attack.
- 26 – The Wonderboompoort Police station is attacked.

Unknown date

- Trevor Manuel becomes the General Secretary of the Cape Areas Housing Action Committee.
- Bulelani Ngcuka is detained by police for eight months.
- A Security Police counter-insurgency unit is started by Dirk Coetzee, Jan Viktor and Jac Buchner with 16 police officers at Vlakplaas.

== Births ==
- 13 January – Ayanda Borotho, actress
- 22 January – Khabonina Qubeka, actress, TV presenter, dancer, choreographer, fitness & wellness coach
- 1 February – Graeme Smith, cricketer
- 2 February – Marlene van Staden, politician (d. 2023)
- 3 February – Jo-Ann Strauss, 2001 Miss South Africa
- 10 February – Maggie Benedict, actress
- 11 February – Alexander Peternell, equestrian rider
- 15 February – Lee-Anne Pace, golfer
- 20 February
  - Akona Ndungane, rugby player
  - Odwa Ndungane, rugby player
- 24 February – Jean De Villiers, Springboks captain
- 26 February – Bridget Masinga, 3rd in the 2002 Miss South Africa pageant, actress, television and radio personality
- 3 March – Julius Malema, Member of Parliament and the founder & leader of the Economic Freedom Fighters
- 16 April
  - Nasief Morris, football player
  - Gareth Echardt, figure skater
- 4 May – Jacques Rudolph, cricketer
- 11 May – Terry Pheto, actress
- 21 May – Jacques le Roux, tenor singer
- 26 May – Zakes Bantwini, musician, recording artist and record producer.
- 29 May – Iain Evans, field hockey player
- 10 June – Albie Morkel, cricketer
- 12 June – Gurthrö Steenkamp, rugby player
- 19 June
  - Quintin Geldenhuys, South African-born Italian rugby player
  - Dorian James, badminton player
- 22 June – Linda Mkhize, rapper and producer (d. 2018)
- 6 July – Jenna Challenor, long-distance runner
- 19 July – Zolani Mahola, singer (Freshlyground)
- 30 July – Juan Smith, rugby player
- 4 September – Lesley Manyathela, football player (d. 2003)
- 8 September – Ashwin Willemse, rugby player & tv rugby analyst
- 29 September – Siyabonga Sangweni, football player
- 19 October – Lucas Thwala, football player
- 22 December – Tumi Morake, comedienne, actress & TV personality
- 26 December – Shu-Aib Walters, football player

== Deaths ==
- 2 March – Thomas Hamilton-Brown, boxer. (b. 1916)
- 19 November – Griffiths Mxenge, activist. (b. 1935)

== Railways ==
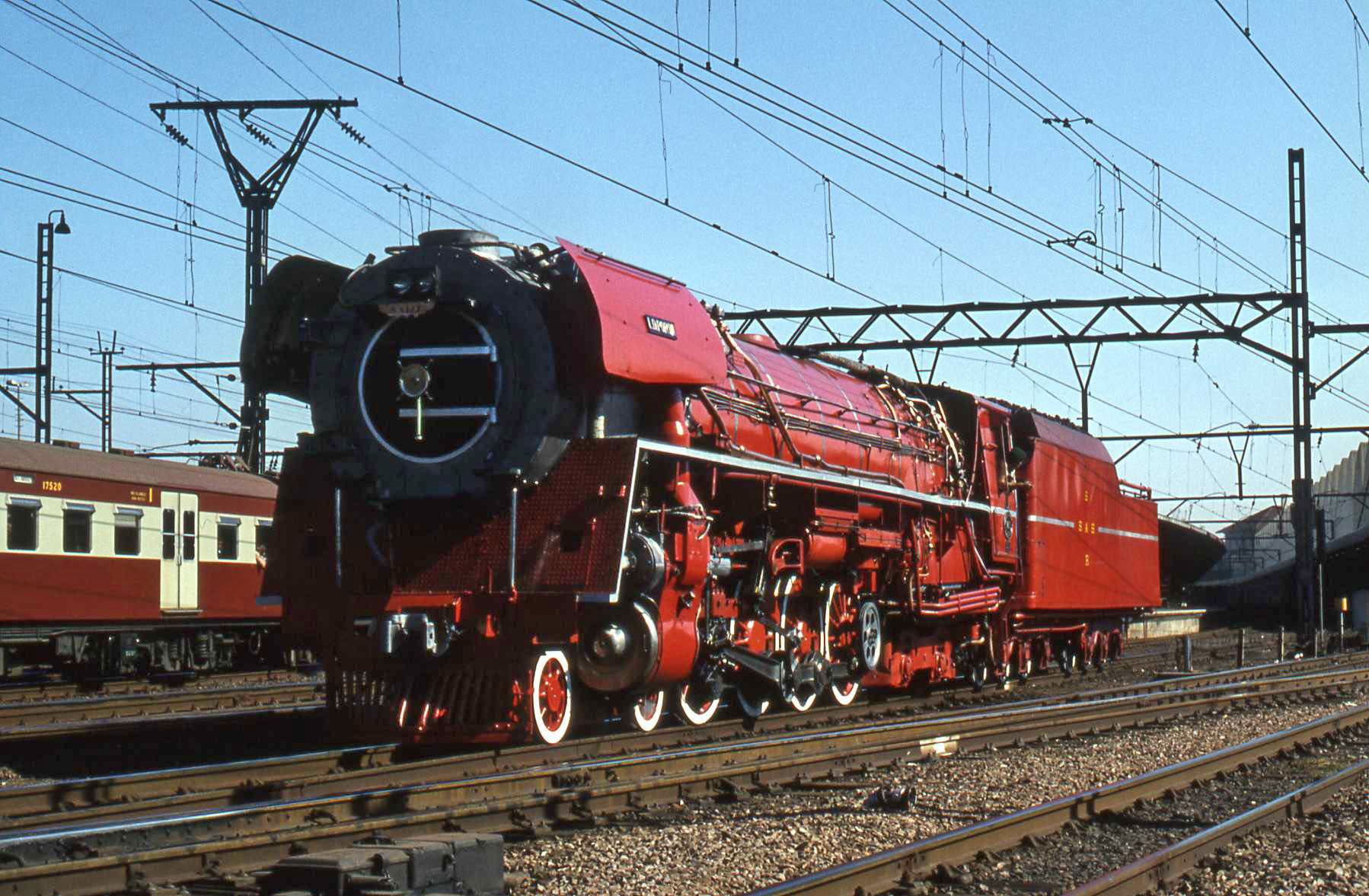
Class 26 Red Devil

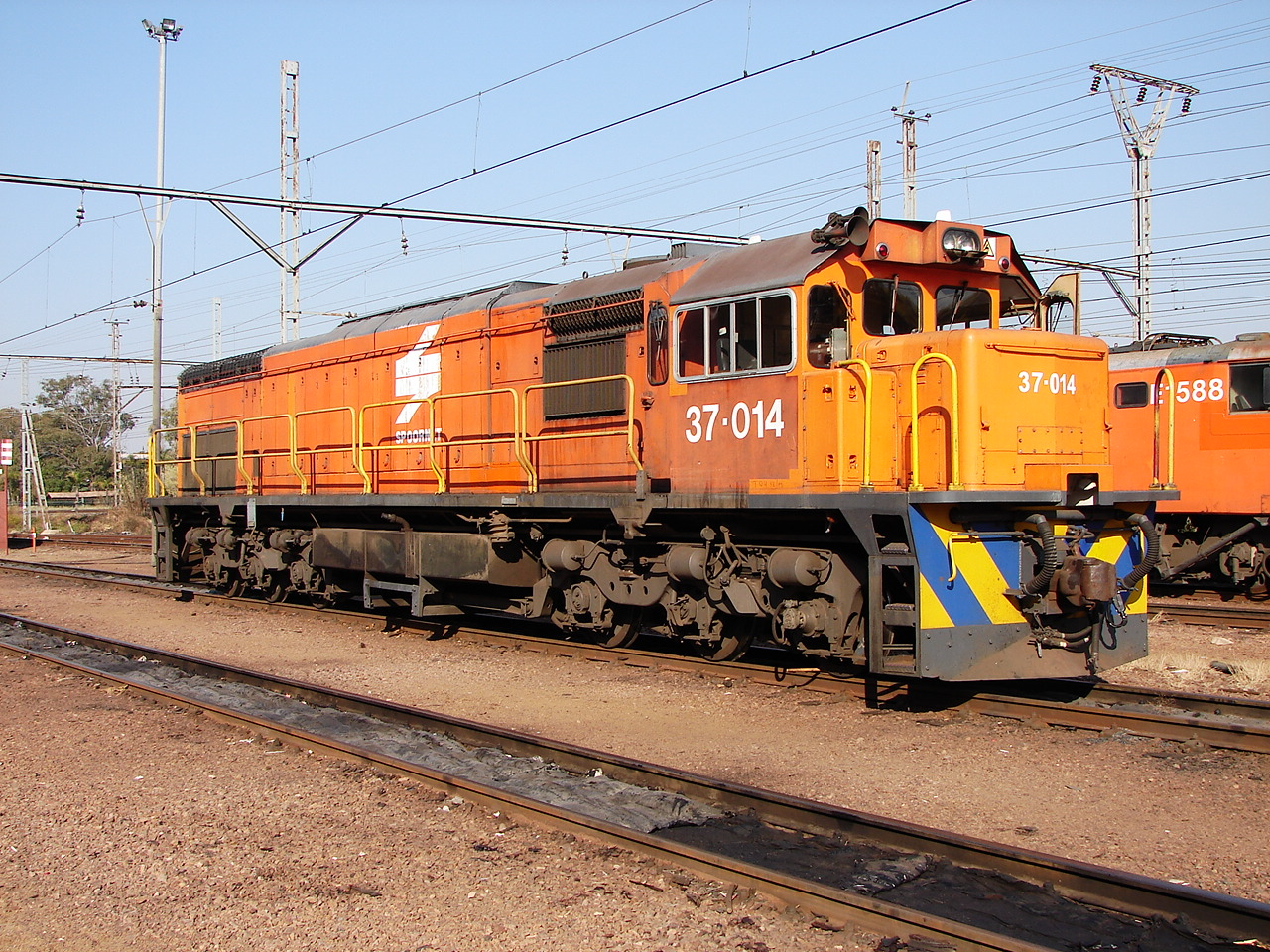
Class 37-000 GM-EMD GT26M2C

=== Locomotives ===
- 5 February – Rebuilding of the Class 26 4-8-4 steam locomotive, popularly known as the Red Devil, is completed at the Salt River Works in Cape Town.
- Two new Cape gauge locomotive types enter service on the South African Railways:
  - May – One hundred Class 37-000 General Motors Electro-Motive Division type GT26M2C diesel-electric locomotives.
  - The first of eighty-five Class 6E1, Series 9 electric locomotives.

== Sports ==
=== Athletics ===
- 17 October – Mark Plaatjes wins his first national title in the men's marathon, clocking 2:16:17 in Potchefstroom.

=== Rugby ===
- 30 May – The South African Springboks beat Ireland 23–15.
- 6 June – The Springboks beat Ireland 12–10.
- 14 August – The South African Springbok tour in New Zealand elicits protests.
