= 1979 in South Africa =

- Decades: 1950s; 1960s; 1970s; 1980s; 1990s
- See also: List of years in South Africa

The following lists events that happened during 1979 in South Africa.

== Incumbents ==
- State President:
  - John Vorster (until 4 June).
  - Marais Viljoen (acting from 4 June, elected from 19 June).
- Prime Minister: P.W. Botha.
- Chief Justice: Frans Lourens Herman Rumpff.

== Events ==
January

- 8 – South Africa and Lesotho sign a monetary agreement.
- 14 – Police clash with Umkhonto we Sizwe guerrillas near Zeerust and arrest one while six escape into Botswana.
- 23 – A bomb explodes near the New Canada railway station in Soweto.
- 24 – A large amount of explosives is found and defused on the railway line between Fort Beaufort and King William's Town.

February

- Sergeant Benjamin Letlako, a Police Special Branch member, is shot dead in Katlehong.

April

- Explosives are discovered and defused on a railway line near Soweto.

May

- 5 – Guerrillas open fire in the Moroka Police Station, killing one and wounding three more policemen and three civilians.
- 29 – Bishop Abel Muzorewa becomes the transitional Prime Minister of Zimbabwe-Rhodesia.

June

- 4 – Following the Information Scandal, John Vorster resigns as State President of South Africa.
- 4 – Marais Viljoen becomes acting State President of South Africa for the second time.
- 19 – Marais Viljoen becomes State President of South Africa.
- Explosives are discovered and defused on a railway line in the Eastern Transvaal.

September

- 22 – A Vela satellite detects a flash in the southern Atlantic Ocean, believed to be a South African-Israeli nuclear test.

November

- Guerrillas open fire and hurl grenades in the Orlando Police Station charge office, killing two policemen and wounding two.
- Grenades are thrown into the home of Special Branch policeman Lt Magezi Ngobeni and five children are wounded.

December

- A bomb explodes and damages the railway line near Alice.
- A bomb explodes at the Sasol Oil Refineries and cause massive structural damage.

Unknown date

- The National Council of Lawyers for Human Rights is established.
- The African National Congress's Special Operations, reporting directly to Oliver Tambo, is established.
- The African National Congress' Nova Catengue Training Camp is attacked and destroyed by the South African Air Force.

== Births ==
- 8 January – Butch James, rugby player
- 10 January – Louise Carver, singer-songwriter, pianist
- 29 January – Mfuneko Ngam, cricketer
- 5 February – Steve Lekoelea, soccer player
- 14 February – Wesley Moodie, tennis player
- 23 February – Jaco van Zyl, golfer
- 25 February – Wikus van Heerden, rugby player
- 18 March – Bonnie Mbuli, actress
- 25 March – Kgomotso Christopher, actress and voice over artist best known for her time in Isidingo as Katlego Sibeko
- 6 April – Manaka Ranaka, actress
- 9 April – Ryan Cox, professional road racing cyclist. (d. 2007)
- 3 June – Deon Carstens, rugby player
- 23 June – Marilyn Agliotti, field hockey player
- 6 July – Zandile Msutwana, actress
- 10 July – Marius Joubert, rugby player
- 4 August – Robin Peterson, cricketer
- 12 September – Gcobani Bobo, rugby player
- 17 September – Neill Blomkamp, film director, producer, screenwriter, and animator.
- 22 September – Bakkies Botha, rugby player
- 9 October – Hendrik Odendaal, swimmer
- 11 October – Zonke, singer
- 21 November – Jason Hartman, singer-songwriter
- 16 December – Trevor Immelman, golfer
- 24 December – DJ Cleo, recording artist, DJ and record producer
- 28 December – Elvis Blue, singer, musician

== Deaths ==
- 6 April – Solomon Mahlangu, Umkhonto we Sizwe operative hanged (b. 1956)
- 12 June – David Sibeko, Pan Africanist Congress representative to the United Nations. (b. 1938)
- 8 August – Lionel Cooper, mathematician. (b. 1915)
- 21 August – Jacob "Mpharanyana" Radebe , songwriter and musician. (b. 1948)
- 10 November – Harry Hart, athlete. (b. 1905)

== Railways ==
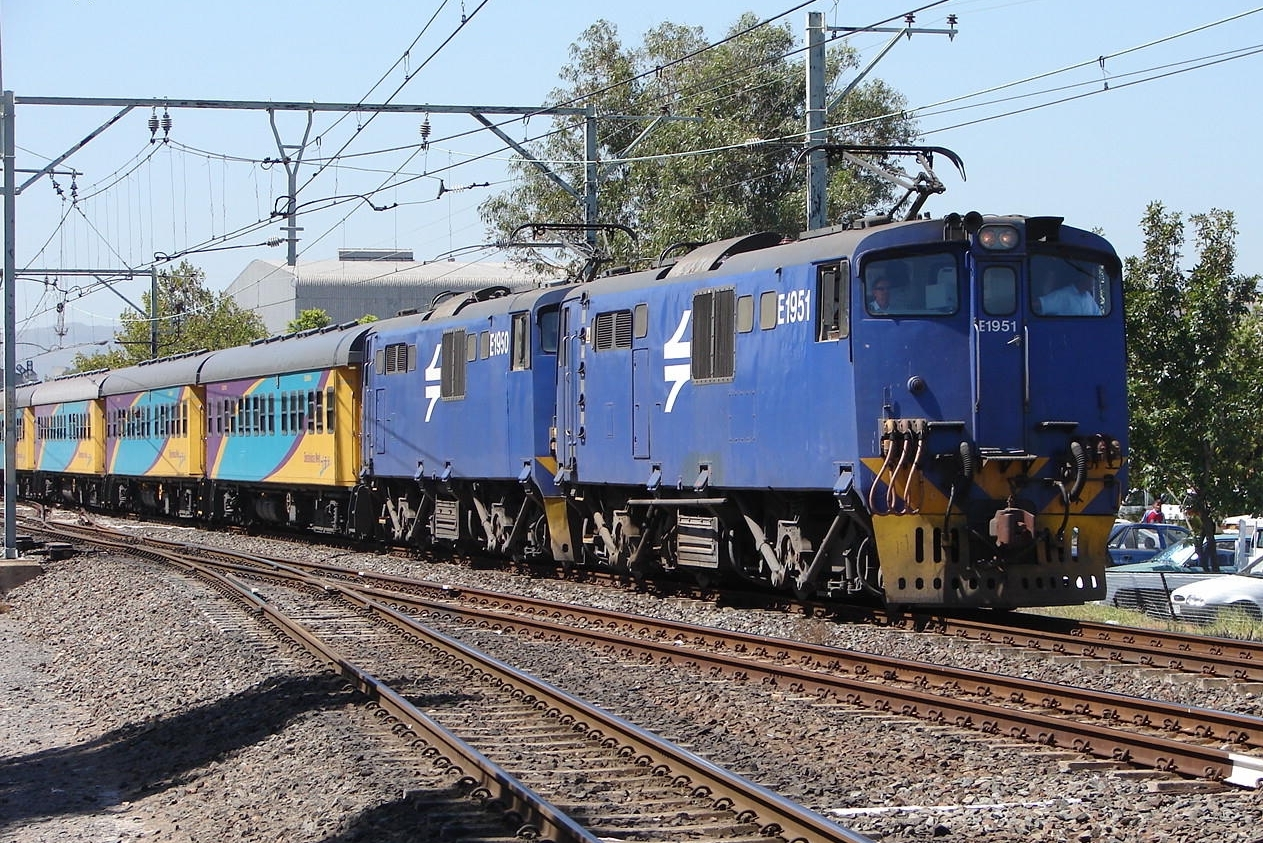
Class 6E1, Series 8

=== Locomotives ===
- The South African Railways places the first of 105 Class 6E1, Series 8 electric locomotives in mainline service.

== Sports ==
=== Motorsport ===
- 3 March – The South African Grand Prix takes place at Kyalami.
- Jody Scheckter becomes Formula One World Champion.
