= Johnston v Leal =

South African legal case

Johnston v Leal is an important case in South African contract law, heard in the Appellate Division on 22 February 1980, by Jansen JA, Corbett JA, Miller JA, Van Winsen AJA and Botha AJA, with judgment handed down on 30 May. The case is valuable, inter alia, for its exposition of the parol evidence rule.
