= 1980 in South Africa =

- Decades: 1960s; 1970s; 1980s; 1990s; 2000s
- See also: List of years in South Africa

The following lists events that happened during 1980 in South Africa.

== Incumbents ==
- State President: Marais Viljoen.
- Prime Minister: P.W. Botha.
- Chief Justice: Frans Lourens Herman Rumpff.

== Events ==
January

- 12 – The British Sports Council begins a fact-finding tour to investigate racial discrimination in South African sport.
- 14 – The local community at Soekmekaar resists forced removal and damages the police station.
- 25 – Four Umkhonto we Sizwe fighters kill and two civilians killed in bank hostage situation in Silverton.

March

- 12 – The Nederduits Gereformeerde Kerk and its three sister churches announce that they have no objection to reconsideration of the Immorality- and Mixed Marriages Acts.
- 12 – Nine people are sentenced to imprisonment for training as guerrillas and recruiting others.
- 27 – A mine lift cage at the Vaal Reefs gold mine falls 1.9 kilometres (1.2 miles), killing 31.
- Two insurgents are killed by police in Bophuthatswana while another escapes.

April

- 4 – Umkhonto we Sizwe attacks the Booysens Police Station in Johannesburg with grenades, rocket launchers and AK47s.
- 21 – Over 60 coloured high schools, teacher training colleges and the University of the Western Cape begin class boycotts.
- 29 – In Johannesburg hundreds of coloured school children are arrested in terms of the Riotous Assemblies Act, 1956.

May

- 2 – Pink Floyd's Another Brick in the Wall is banned for fear that it may become a song of liberty by black pupils.
- 6 – Thozamile Botha, a Port Elizabeth activist, breaks his banning order and escapes to Maseru, Lesotho.
- 25 – The South African Defence Force attacks the town of Chifufua in Angola during Operation Sceptic.

June

- 1 – Bombs explode at Sasol One and Two and Natref Eight at Sasolburg and Secunda, with no injuries and RM58 damage.
- 4 – Patrick Makau, Umkhonto weSizwe member, and his child die in a bomb attack in Manzini, Swaziland.
- Expelled African National Congress official Tennyson Makiwane is shot dead.

August

- Special Branch policeman Detective-Sergeant T.G. Zondi is shot at in Sobantu Village.

September

- 3 – Zimbabwe breaks diplomatic and consular relations with South Africa but maintains a commercial mission in Johannesburg.

October

- 14 – The Soweto community calls for a stayaway to protest against rent increases.
- 15 – A bomb damages a railway line in Dube, Soweto and Minister Piet Koornhof visits the scene.
- 29 – Umkhonto we Sizwe insurgents throw grenades into the West Rand Administration Board buildings, injuring two.
- 30 – A bomb explodes at the Transkei consul's residence in Port Elizabeth, with no injuries.

== Births ==
- 1 January – Megan McKenzie, model, voted South Africa's sexiest woman by readers of FHM in 2003, ranking behind only Halle Berry, sister of cricketer, Neil McKenzie.
- 4 January – Justin Ontong, cricketer
- 4 January – BJ Botha, rugby player
- 10 February – Gabriel Temudzani, actor
- 5 March – Brent Russell, rugby player
- 20 March – Surprise Moriri, football player
- 24 March – Conrad Jantjes, rugby player
- 14 May – Joe Van Niekerk, rugby player
- 19 May – Moeneeb Josephs, football player
- 6 June – Mmusi Maimane, politician and former Democratic Alliance leader
- 20 June – Kim Engelbrecht, actress best known for her portrayal of Lolly de Klerk on the SABC 3 soap opera; Isidingo
- 27 June – Kevin Pietersen, cricketer
- 3 July – Roland Schoeman, swimmer
- 11 July – Jabu Mahlangu, football player
- 27 August – CJ van der Linde, rugby player
- 8 September – Mbulaeni Mulaudzi, olympics middle distance runner silver medalist (d. 2014)
- 14 September – Hip Hop Pantsula, motswako rapper (d. 2018)
- 16 September – Mbulelo Mabizela, football player
- 24 September – Tanit Phoenix, model, actress, and makeup artist
- 12 August – Karin Kortje, singer
- 8 October – Cristina Boshoff, folk pop singer & pianist
- 9 October – Thami Tsolekile, cricketer
- 3 November – René Kalmer, long-distance runner
- 9 November– Benson Mhlongo, football player
- 11 November – Shashi Naidoo, TV presenter & actress
- 15 November – Kabamba Floors, rugby player
- 25 November – Aaron Mokoena, football player
- 25 November – Alviro Petersen, cricketer

== Deaths ==
- 24 February – Clement Martyn Doke, linguist. (b. 1893)
- 13 March – Lilian Ngoyi (Mma Ngoyi), dressmaker, activist and trade unionist. (b. 1911)
- 9 May – Kate Molale, activist. (b. 1928)
- 12 June – Billy Butlin, South African–born Canadian holiday camp entrepreneur. (b. 1899)
- 7 July – Johannes Meintjes, artist and writer. (b. 1923)
- 23 September – Jim Fouché, second State President. (b. 1898)

== Railways ==
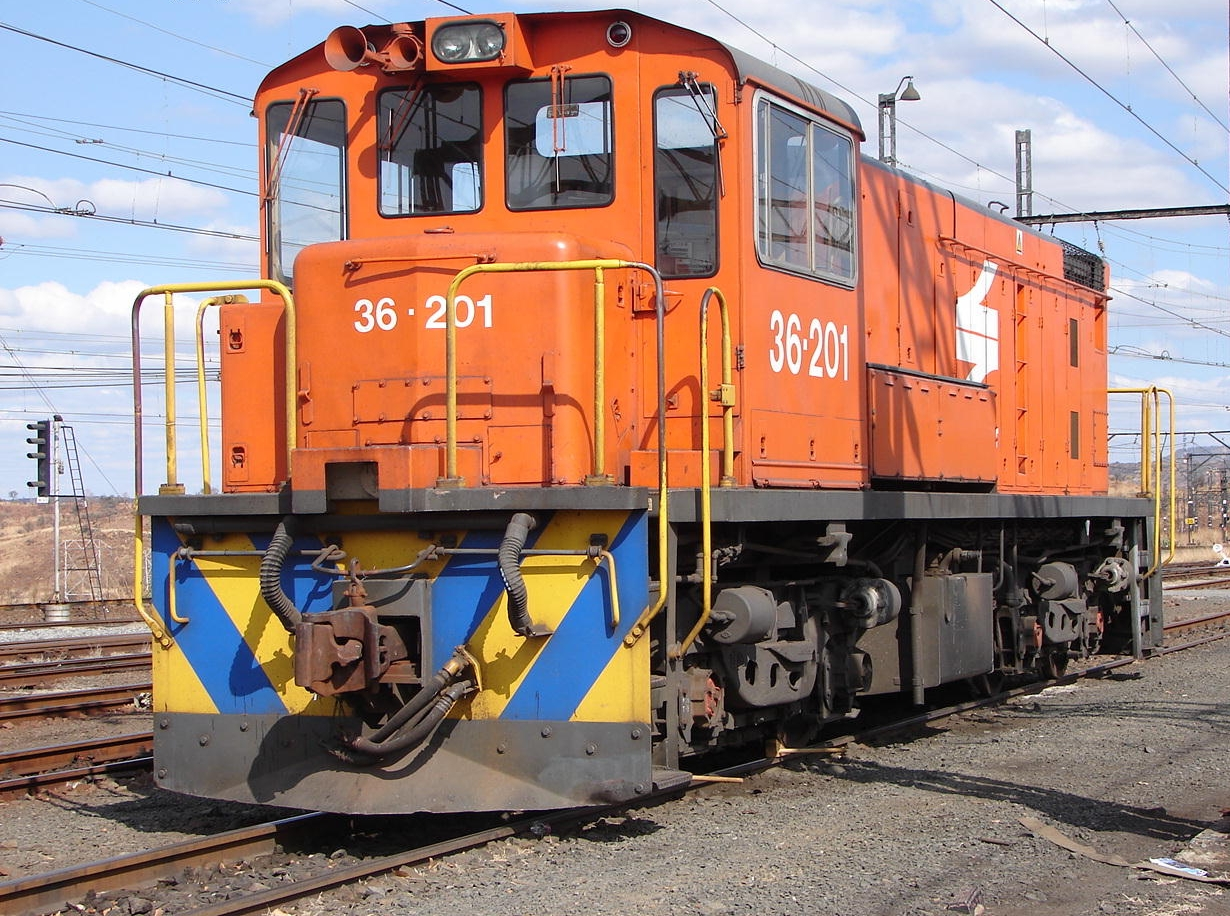
Class 36-200 (GM-EMD SW1002)

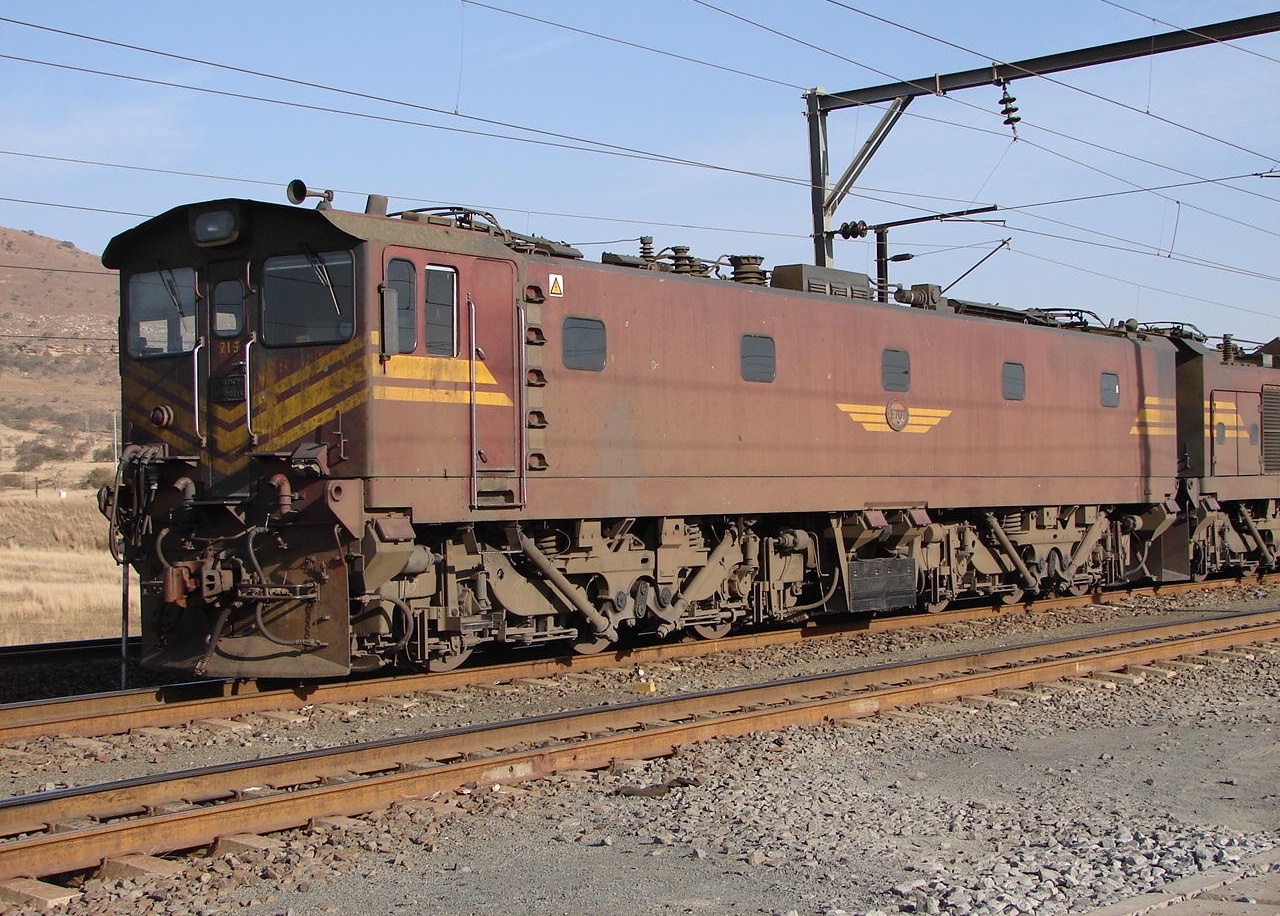
Class 7E1

=== Locomotives ===
Three new Cape gauge locomotive types enter service on the South African Railways:

- August – The first of 101 Class 36-200 General Motors Electro-Motive Division SW1002 diesel-electric locomotives.
- The first of thirty Class 34-900 General Electric type U26C diesel-electric locomotives.
- The first of fifty 25 kV AC Class 7E1 electric locomotives on the Richards Bay coal line.

== Sports ==
=== Athletics ===
- 11 October – Thompson Magawana wins his first national title in the men's marathon, clocking 2:12:50 in Faure.

=== Motorsport ===
- 1 March – The South African Grand Prix takes place at Kyalami.

=== Rugby ===
- 10 May – The British and Irish Lions begin an 18-match tour of South Africa despite protests from anti-apartheid groups. The tourists lose three of the four Tests.
