= DuPreez Strauss =

South African conductor

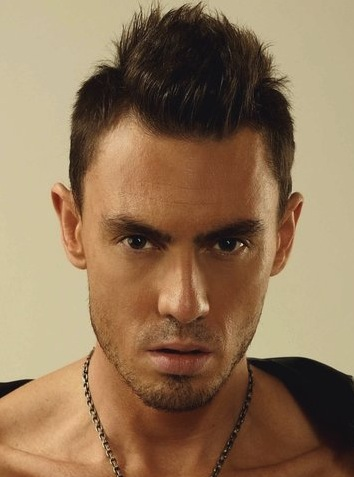
- DuPreez Strauss, 2012
- Born: 7 June 1978 (age 48); Pretoria, South Africa
- Occupations: Music director and tv personality

Cornelis Johannes DuPreez Strauss (born 7 June 1978) is a multi-disciplinary artist originally from South Africa. He has lived and worked on 5 continents and is best known as director and producer of music, TV, theatre and radio, composer, lyricist, visual artist, writer, architectural designer, orchestra conductor, TV personality and property investor.

He ranks within the top 1% wealthiest individuals in South Africa, and the top 2% most intelligent people world-wide - as a member of Mensa since 2012.

He starred as a main character in 120 episodes of the TV series SugaRushed (the real-life TV drama set inside his record label studios) and has conducted Disney's The Lion King Musical in 8 countries. His TV show "My Vreemde Vriende / Strangers For Friends" was nominated for a South African Film and TV Award for Best Lifestyle Show in 2021.

== Education ==
Strauss was classically trained on the piano for 17 years. He passed cum laude the final piano examinations of both the University of South Africa and the Associated Board of the Royal Schools of Music (London, England).

He holds 2 cum laude Bachelor of Arts Degrees from the University of the Free State and the University of Stellenbosch - in a variety of subjects from Fine Arts to History of Art, Philosophy, Psychology, Political Philosophy, Afrikaans, Dutch and German Literature and Communications.

He learned Orchestra Conducting at the Juilliard School of Music in New York City under maestro Vincent La Selva, resident conductor at Cargenie Hall.

== Career ==
Strauss was music director for the South African a cappella group Overtone when they were discovered by Dina Eastwood. They went on to perform the soundtrack to Clint Eastwood's feature film Invictus (film).

Strauss has musically directed many full-scale theatre productions, including Sweeney Todd (FrenchWoods, New York City), South African Best New Musical 2003 award winner Mercury Rising, Big Top Burlesque, Somebody To Love, Jacques Brel Is Alive And Well And Living in Paris and Divas of Music and Dance.

Strauss conducted Disney's The Lion King (musical) in South Africa (2008), Taiwan (2009) and Singapore (2011) and on the official international tour spanning 8 countries and 3 continents from 2018 to 2023. He also worked with Oscar-winning director Julie Taymor, Grammy Award winner Lebo M and Tony Award winner Garth Fagan on revising "The Lion King" for its 10th Anniversary production.

From 2012 - 2013, Strauss starred in SugaRushed, a reality soap about him and his music producer partner, Bradley Africa, running a record label. The series was aired on TopTV in South Africa.

Strauss co-produced "Jacobsbaai", the first ever English-and-multi-African-language play in New York City, at the Cherry Lane Theatre. He co-produced and co-presented the "Outspoken" radio show, which aired across Sub-Saharan Africa.

Strauss composed, performed and produced the song "Hidroponies" by his band "ZombieVampire", as well as directing the music video. The music video was in the official selection of the Out Twin Cities International Film Festival in Minneapolis in 2012.

Strauss has starred as TV actor in the South African soaps "Scandal" and "Villa Rosa" (2011) and the drama series "Intersexions", as well as acting in Canadian film director Bruce LaBruce's "X-Homes".

Strauss was one of the faces of Mustang Jeans and Underwear (2011 worldwide campaign) shot by Danish photographer Klaus Thymann.

Strauss has performed for Oprah Winfrey, Celine Dion, Elton John, Morgan Freeman, Clint Eastwood, Matt Damon and Nelson Mandela.

The "Skycave" property, created by Strauss, was awarded as one of the Favourite Homes of 2023 on SABC3's lifestyle TV show "The Insider SA".

Since 2021, Strauss has received positive reviews for his one-man grand piano show "Dreamland" which has toured South Africa and Australia.

His third solo art exhibition "SEEING IN THE DARK" is touring Australia and South Africa in 2025 and 2026 to significant media attention and critical acclaim.
