= South African Class 6E1, Series 8 =

1979 design of electric locomotive

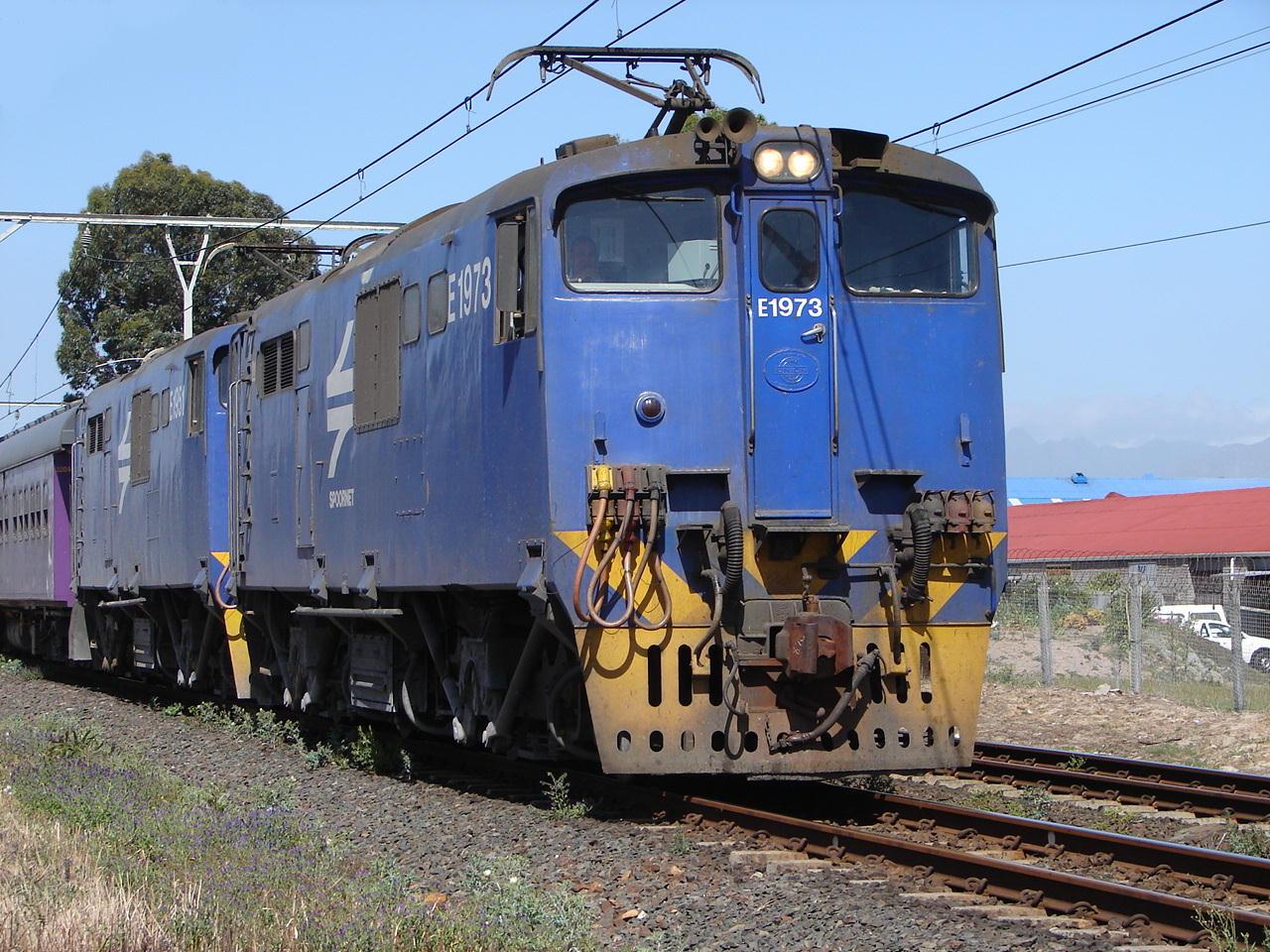
- E1973 leading the Premier Classe at Stikland, Cape Town, 17 November 2006
Type and origin
- Power type: Electric
- Designer: Union Carriage & Wagon
- Builder: Union Carriage & Wagon
- Model: UCW 6E1
- Build date: 1979-1981
- Total produced: 105
- Rebuilder: ♠ Transwerk ♥ Transnet Rail Engineering
- Rebuild date: ♠ 1993-1994 - ♥ 2000-2013
- Number rebuilt: ♠ 58 known to Class 17E ♥ 100 to Class 18E, Series 1 & 2
Specifications
- Configuration
  - AAR: B-B
  - UIC: Bo'Bo'
  - Commonwealth: Bo-Bo
- Gauge: 3 ft 6 in (1,067 mm) Cape gauge
- Wheel diameter: 1,220 mm (48.03 in)
- Wheelbase: 11,279 mm (37 ft 0 in)
  - Bogie: 3,430 mm (11 ft 3 in)
- Pivot centres: 7,849 mm (25 ft 9 in)
- Panto shoes: 6,972 mm (22 ft 10 1/2 in)
- Length
  - Over couplers: 15,494 mm (50 ft 10 in)
  - Over body: 14,631 mm (48 ft 0 in)
- Width: 2,896 mm (9 ft 6 in)
- Height
  - Pantograph: 4,089 mm (13 ft 5 in)
  - Body height: 3,937 mm (12 ft 11 in)
- Axle load: 22,226 kg (49,000 lb)
- Adhesive weight: 88,904 kg (196,000 lb)
- Loco weight: 88,904 kg (196,000 lb)
- Electric system/s: 3 kV DC catenary
- Current pickup(s): Pantographs
- Traction motors: Four AEI-283AY
  - Rating 1 hour: 623 kW (835 hp)
  - Continuous: 563 kW (755 hp)
- Gear ratio: 18:67
- Loco brake: Air & Regenerative
- Train brakes: Air & Vacuum
- Couplers: AAR knuckle
Performance figures
- Maximum speed: 113 km/h (70 mph)
- Power output
  - 1 hour: 2,492 kW (3,342 hp)
  - Continuous: 2,252 kW (3,020 hp)
- Tractive effort
  - Starting: 311 kN (70,000 lbf)
  - 1 hour: 221 kN (50,000 lbf)
  - Continuous: 193 kN (43,000 lbf) @ 40 km/h (25 mph)
Career
- Operators: South African Railways; Spoornet; Transnet Freight Rail; Passenger Rail Agency of South Africa
- Class: Class 6E1
- Number in class: 105
- Numbers: E1896-E2000
- Delivered: 1979-1981
- First run: 1979

The South African Railways Class 6E1, Series 8 of 1979 was an electric locomotive.

Between 1979 and 1981, the South African Railways placed 105 Class 6E1, Series 8 electric locomotives with a Bo-Bo wheel arrangement in mainline service.

== Manufacturer ==
The 3 kV DC Class 6E1, Series 8 electric locomotive was designed and built for the South African Railways (SAR) by Union Carriage & Wagon (UCW) in Nigel, Transvaal. The electrical equipment was supplied by the General Electric Company (GEC).

Between 1979 and 1981, 105 locomotives were delivered, numbered in the range from E1896 to E2000. Like Series 6 and 7, the Series 8 units were equipped with AEI-283AY traction motors. UCW did not allocate builder's or works numbers to the locomotives it built for the SAR, but used the SAR unit numbers for their record keeping.

== Characteristics ==
=== Orientation ===
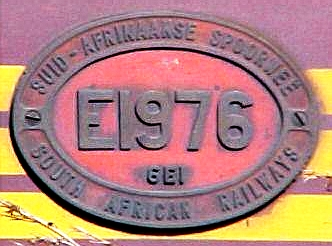
Builder's plate

These dual cab locomotives had a roof access ladder on one side only, just to the right of the cab access door. The roof access ladder end was marked as the no. 2 end. A corridor along the centre of the locomotive connected the cabs which were identical apart from the fact that the handbrake was located in cab 2. A pantograph hook stick was stowed in a tube mounted below the lower edge of the locomotive body on the roof access ladder side. The locomotive had one square and two rectangular access panels along the lower half of the body on the roof access ladder side and only one square access panel on the opposite side.

=== Series identifying features ===
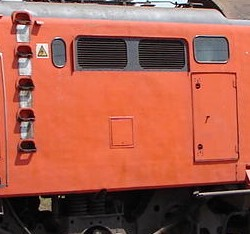
Hatch door R

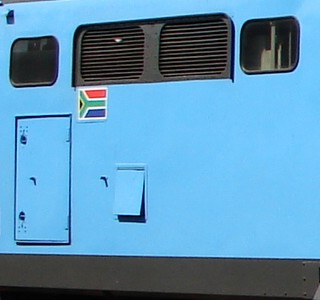
Hatch door L

The Class 6E1 was produced in eleven series over a period of nearly sixteen years. While some of the Class 6E1 series are visually indistinguishable from their predecessors or successors, some externally visible changes did occur over the years.

Series 8 was the only Class 6E1 series with unique visual distinguishing features. It could be distinguished from all earlier series by its large hatch door on each side, below the second small window to the right of the side door on the roof access ladder side and below the first window immediately to the right of the side door on the other side. It could also be distinguished from all subsequent series by the absence of rainwater drainage holes along the lower body sides.

=== Crew access ===
The Class 5E, 5E1, 6E and 6E1 locomotives were notoriously difficult to enter from ground level since their lever-style door handles were at waist level when standing inside the cab. This made it impossible to open the door from outside without first climbing up high enough to reach the door handle while hanging on to the side handrails with one hand only. Crews therefore often choose to leave the doors ajar when parking and exiting the locomotives.

Series 8 and some late model Series 7 locomotives were equipped with doors on which the outside door latch handle was mounted near floor level with a simple drawer pull type handle at mid-door level.

== Service ==
The Class 6E1 family saw service all over both 3 kV DC mainline and branch line networks, the smaller Cape Western mainline between Cape Town and Beaufort West and the larger network which covers portions of the Northern Cape, the Free State, Natal, Gauteng, North West and Mpumalanga.

== Reclassification and rebuilding ==
=== Reclassification to Class 16E ===
During 1990 and 1991, Spoornet semi-permanently coupled several pairs of otherwise largely unmodified Class 6E1 locomotives, reclassified them to Class 16E and allocated a single locomotive number to each pair, with the individual units in the pairs inscribed "A" or "B". The aim was to accomplish savings on cab maintenance by coupling the units at their no. 1 ends, abandoning the no. 1 end cabs in terms of maintenance and using only the no. 2 end cabs. Most were later either disbanded with the units reverting to Class 6E1 and regaining their original numbers or getting rebuilt to Class 18E.

Ten known Series 8 locomotives were part of such Class 16E pairs.

- E1914 and E1915 became 16-503 A and B.
- E1916 and E1917 became 16-501 A and B.
- E1918 and E1919 became 16-505 A and B.
- E1925 and E1926 became 16-504 A and B.
- E1928 and E1929 became 16-506 A and B.

=== Modification to Class 17E ===
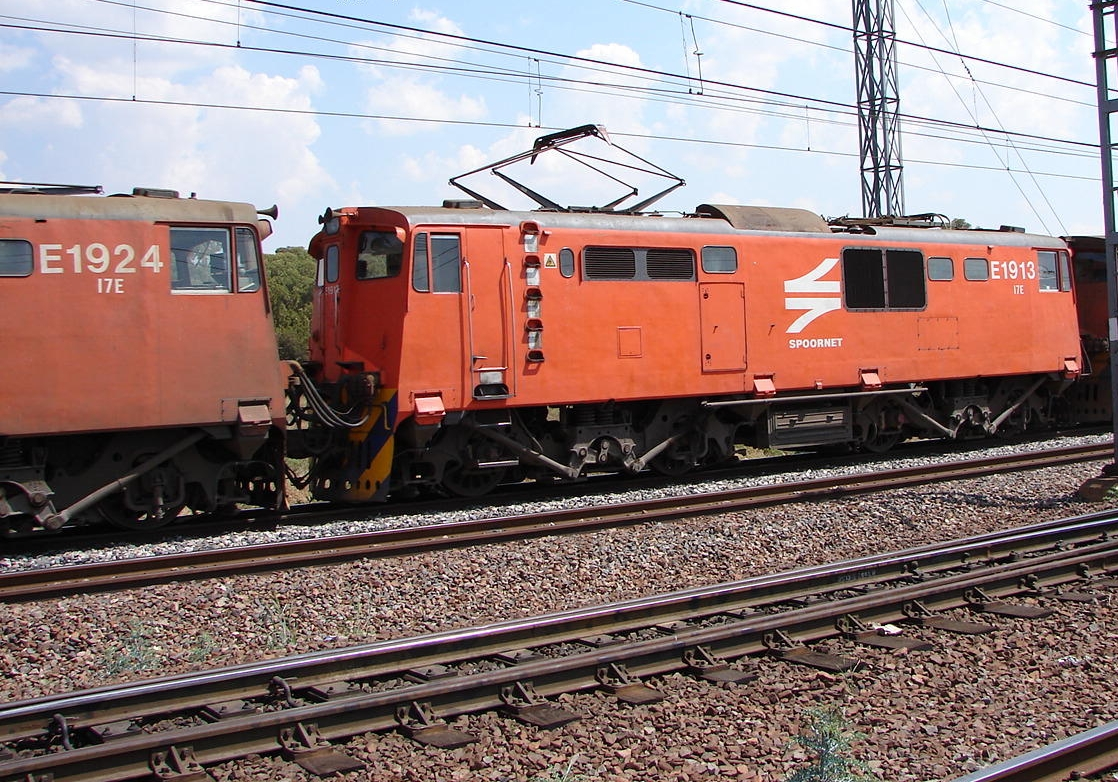
No. E1913 as Class 17E, Capital Park, Pretoria, 28 September 2006

Class 17E locomotives were modified and reclassified from Class 6E1 Series 7, 8 or 9 locomotives during 1993 and 1994. Key modifications included improved regenerative braking and wheel-slip control to improve their reliability on the steep gradients and curves of the Natal mainline. Unlike the unmodified but reclassified Class 16E locomotives, the Class 17Es retained their original unit numbers after reclassification.

A stumbling block was that the regeneration equipment at many of the sub-stations along the route was unreliable. Since there was no guarantee that another train would be in the same section to absorb the regenerated energy, there was always the risk that line voltage could exceed 4.1 kV, which would make either the sub-station or the locomotive trip out. As a result, the subsequently rebuilt Class 18E locomotives were not equipped with regenerative braking.

Fifty-five known Series 8 locomotives were modified and reclassified to Class 17E. Their unit numbers are listed in the table.

=== Rebuilding to Class 18E ===
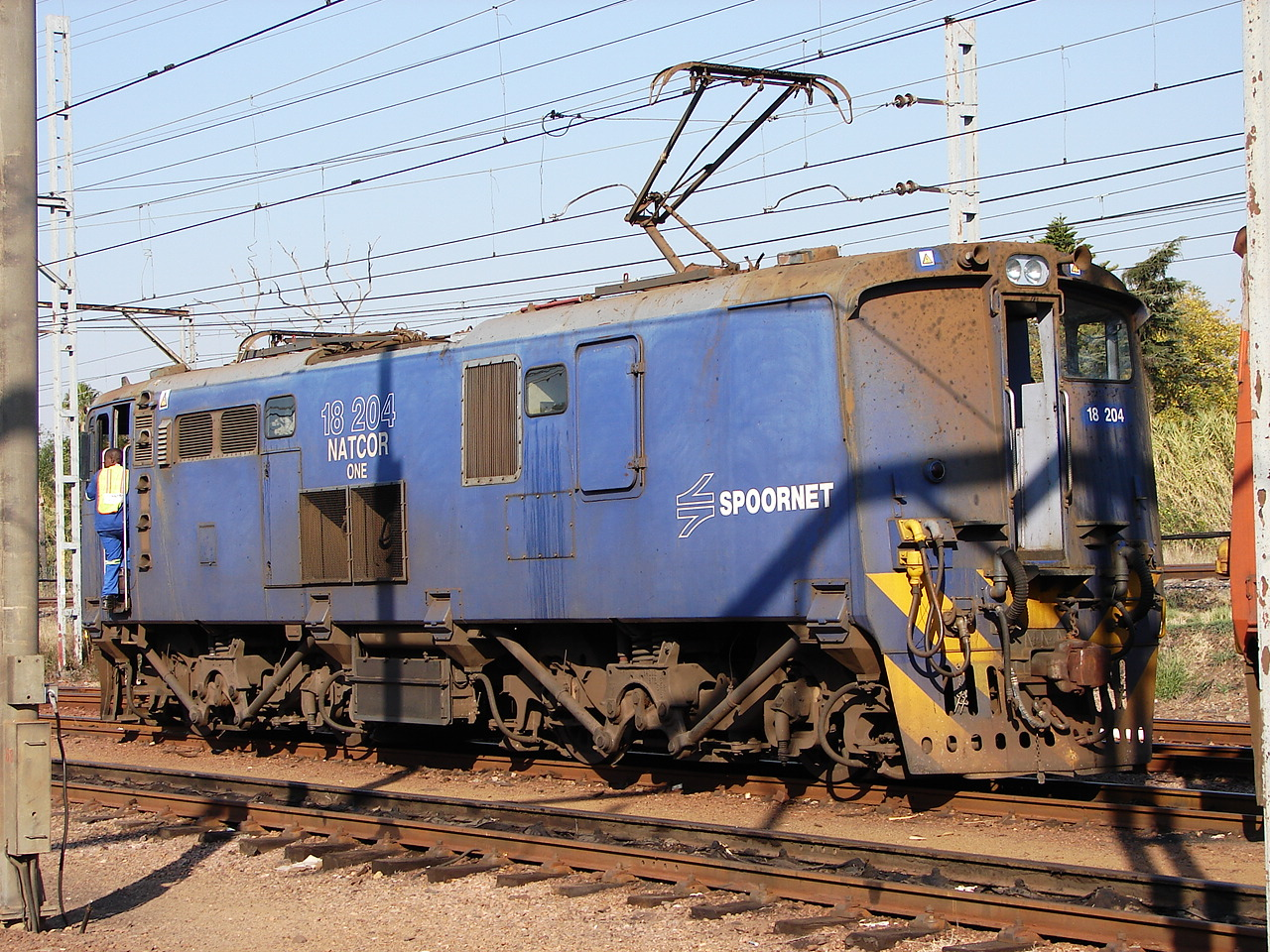
Cab 1 of Class 18E no. 18-204, ex Class 6E1 no. E1972, Capital Park, Pretoria, 16 May 2013

Beginning in 2000, Spoornet began a project to rebuild Series 2 to 11 Class 6E1 locomotives to Class 18E, Series 1 and Series 2 at the Transnet Rail Engineering workshops at Koedoespoort. In the process the cab at the no. 1 end was stripped of all controls and the driver's front and side windows were blanked off to have a toilet installed, thereby forfeiting the locomotive's bi-directional ability.

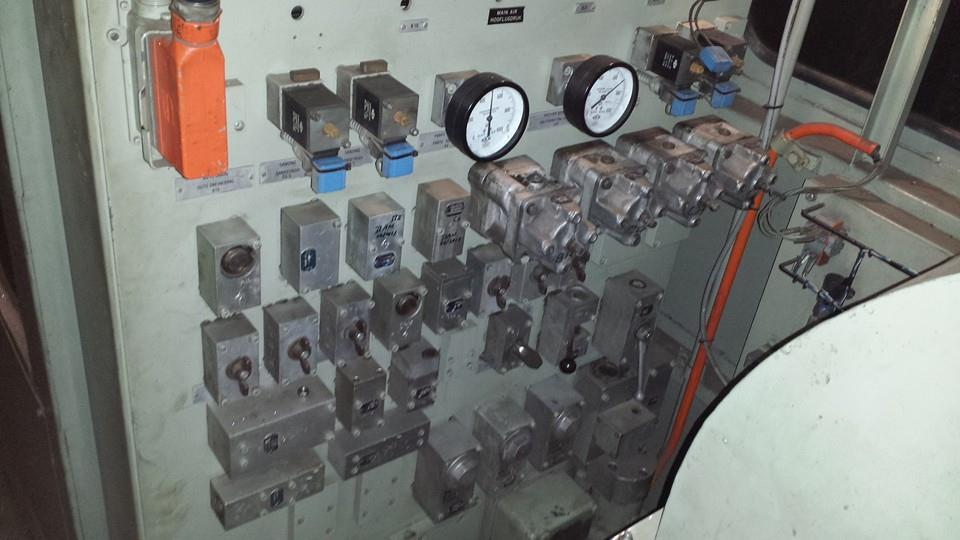
Brake rack in Class 18E no. 18-089

Since the driving cab's noise level had to be below 85 decibels, cab 2 was selected as the Class 18E driving cab primarily based on its lower noise level compared to cab 1, which was closer and more exposed to the compressor's noise and vibration. Another factor was the closer proximity of cab 2 to the low voltage switch panel. The fact that the handbrake was located in cab 2 was not a deciding factor, but was considered an additional benefit.

While the earlier Class 6E1, Series 2 to 7 locomotives had been built with a brake system which consisted of various valves connected to each other with pipes and commonly referred to as a "bicycle frame" brake system, the Class 6E1, Series 8 to 11 locomotives were built with an air equipment frame brake system, commonly referred to as a brake rack. Since the design of the rebuilt Class 18E locomotives included the same brake rack, the rebuilding project was begun with the newer series 8 to 11 locomotives to reduce the overall cost of rebuilding.

Bar two, all the Class 6E1, Series 8 locomotives which were used in this rebuilding project were rebuilt to Class 18E, Series 1 locomotives. The known numbers and renumbering details are listed in the table.

Class 6E1, Series 8 units rebuilt to Class 18E as on 31 January 2014
Count	6E1 no.	Year built	18E no.	18E series	Year rebuilt	Notes
1	E1896	1979	18-608	2	2010	
2	E1897	1979	18-383	1	2008	
3	E1898	1979	18-420	1	2009	PRASA
4	E1899	1979	18-195	1	2005	
5	E1900	1979	18-262	1	2006	ex 17E
6	E1901	1979	18-298	1	2006	ex 17E
7	E1902	1979	18-021	1	2002	
8	E1903	1979	18-025	1	2002	
9	E1904	1979	18-087	1	2003	ex 17E
10	E1905	1979	18-311	1	2007	ex 17E
11	E1906	1979	18-284	1	2006	ex 17E
12	E1907	1979	18-330	1	2007	ex 17E
13	E1908	1979	18-288	1	2006	ex 17E
14	E1909	1979	18-061	1	2002	ex 17E
15	E1910	1979	18-295	1	2006	ex 17E
16	E1911	1979	18-012	1	2001	
17	E1912	1979	18-010	1	2001	
18	E1913	1979	18-340	1	2007	ex 17E
19	E1914	1979	18-077	1	2003	ex 16-503A
20	E1915	1979	18-078	1	2003	ex 16-503B
21	E1916	1979-80	18-035	1	2002	ex 16-501A
22	E1917	1979-80	18-036	1	2002	ex 16-501B
23	E1918	1979-80	18-063	1	2002	ex 16-505A
24	E1919	1979-80	18-067	1	2003	ex 16-505B
25	E1920	1979-80	18-006	1	2001	
26	E1921	1979-80	18-341	1	2007	ex 17E
27	E1922	1979-80	18-306	1	2007	ex 17E
28	E1923	1979-80	18-286	1	2006	
29	E1924	1979-80	18-334	1	2007	ex 17E
30	E1925	1979-80	18-033	1	2002	ex 16-504A
31	E1926	1979-80	18-034	1	2002	ex 16-504B
32	E1927	1979-80	18-507	1	2009	
33	E1928	1979-80	18-055	1	2002	ex 16-506A
34	E1929	1979-80	18-049	1	2002	ex 16-506B
35	E1931	1980	18-202	1	2005	ex 17E
36	E1932	1980	18-221	1	2005	
37	E1933	1980	18-320	1	2007	ex 17E
38	E1934	1980	18-094	1	2003	ex 17E
39	E1935	1980	18-018	1	2002	ex 17E
40	E1936	1980	18-274	1	2006	ex 17E
41	E1937	1980	18-216	1	2005	ex 17E
42	E1938	1980	18-293	1	2006	ex 17E
43	E1939	1980	18-203	1	2005	ex 17E
44	E1940	1980	18-084	1	2003	ex 17E
45	E1941	1980	18-200	1	2005	
46	E1942	1980	18-011	1	2001	
47	E1943	1980	18-248	1	2006	
48	E1944	1980	18-197	1	2005	ex 17E
49	E1945	1980	18-207	1	2005	ex 17E
50	E1946	1980	18-062	1	2002	ex 17E
51	E1947	1980	18-290	1	2006	ex 17E
52	E1948	1980	18-069	1	2003	
53	E1949	1980	18-064	1	2002	ex 17E
54	E1951	1980	18-741	2	2013	
55	E1952	1980	18-419	1	2009	PRASA
56	E1954	1980	18-001	1	2000	
57	E1955	1980	18-002	1	2001	
58	E1957	1980	18-415	1	2009	PRASA
59	E1958	1980	18-072	1	2003	
60	E1959	1980	18-199	1	2005	
61	E1960	1980	18-220	1	2005	
62	E1961	1980	18-015	1	2002	
63	E1962	1980	18-070	1	2003	ex 17E
64	E1963	1980	18-051	1	2002	
65	E1964	1980	18-329	1	2007	ex 17E
66	E1965	1980	18-316	1	2007	ex 17E
67	E1966	1980	18-178	1	2005	ex 17E
68	E1967	1980	18-263	1	2006	ex 17E
69	E1968	1980	18-222	1	2005	ex 17E
70	E1969	1980	18-201	1	2005	ex 17E
71	E1970	1980	18-378	1	2008	
72	E1971	1980	18-269	1	2006	ex 17E
73	E1972	1980	18-204	1	2005	
74	E1973	1980	18-376	1	2007	
75	E1974	1980	18-019	1	2002	
76	E1975	1980	18-014	1	2002	
77	E1976	1980	18-256	1	2006	ex 17E
78	E1978	1980	18-013	1	2001	
79	E1979	1980	18-337	1	2007	ex 17E
80	E1980	1980	18-026	1	2002	
81	E1981	1980	18-027	1	2002	
82	E1982	1980	18-272	1	2006	ex 17E
83	E1983	1980	18-296	1	2006	ex 17E
84	E1984	1980-81	18-226	1	2005	ex 17E
85	E1985	1980-81	18-312	1	2007	ex 17E
86	E1986	1980-81	18-215	1	2005	ex 17E
87	E1987	1980-81	18-324	1	2007	ex 17E
88	E1988	1981	18-041	1	2002	
89	E1989	1981	18-303	1	2006	ex 17E
90	E1990	1981	18-310	1	2007	ex 17E
91	E1991	1981	18-225	1	2005	ex 17E
92	E1992	1981	18-278	1	2006	ex 17E
93	E1993	1981	18-336	1	2007	ex 17E
94	E1994	1981	18-305	1	2006	ex 17E
95	E1995	1981	18-279	1	2006	ex 17E
96	E1996	1981	18-315	1	2007	ex 17E
97	E1997	1981	18-156	1	2004	ex 17E
98	E1998	1981	18-237	1	2006	ex 17E
99	E1999	1981	18-065	1	2002	ex 17E
100	E2000	1981	18-309	1	2007	ex 17E

== Liveries ==
All but six Class 6E1, Series 8 locomotives were delivered in the SAR Gulf Red livery with signal red cowcatchers, yellow whiskers and with the number plates on the sides mounted on three-stripe yellow wings. The six exceptions, numbers E1950 to E1955, were delivered in blue with yellow whiskers for use with the Blue Train between Cape Town and Beaufort West. However, there was a demand for two more blue train locomotives and 1956 and 1957 were repainted in blue. In the 1990s many of the Series 8 units began to be repainted in the Spoornet orange livery with a yellow and blue chevron pattern on the cowcatchers. Some later received the Spoornet maroon livery while numbers E1950 to E1957 and no. E1973 were repainted in either the Spoornet orange era or maroon era blue train livery. In the Passenger Rail Agency of South Africa (PRASA) era after 2008, no. E1950 was first repainted in the Shosholoza Meyl purple livery and later in the PRASA blue livery.

The main picture shows both versions of the Spoornet Blue Train livery. The leading locomotive, no. E1973, is in the orange era livery with the name "SPOORNET" below the emblem on the side, while the trailing locomotive, no. E1951, is in the maroon era livery without the name "SPOORNET" below the emblem on the side.

Four of the Blue Train locomotives were damaged on 24 April 1997 when train numbers 81007 and 18008, two Trans-Karoo passenger trains, collided at Gouda. The four damaged locomotives were later replaced by eight Class 6E locomotives which were repainted in blue.

Of the four damaged blue locomotives, numbers E1953 and E1956 were scrapped while numbers E1954 and E1955 were rebuilt to the first two Class 18E locomotives in 2000 and 2001, numbered 18-001 and 18-002 respectively.

== Illustration ==
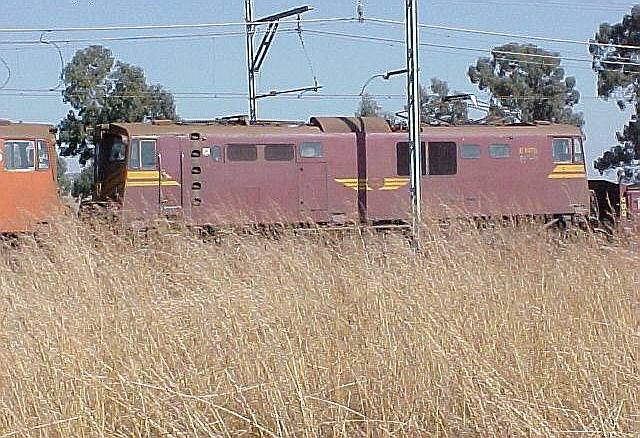
No. E1976 in SAR Gulf Red and yellow whiskers livery near Balfour, Mpumalanga, 2 June 2005

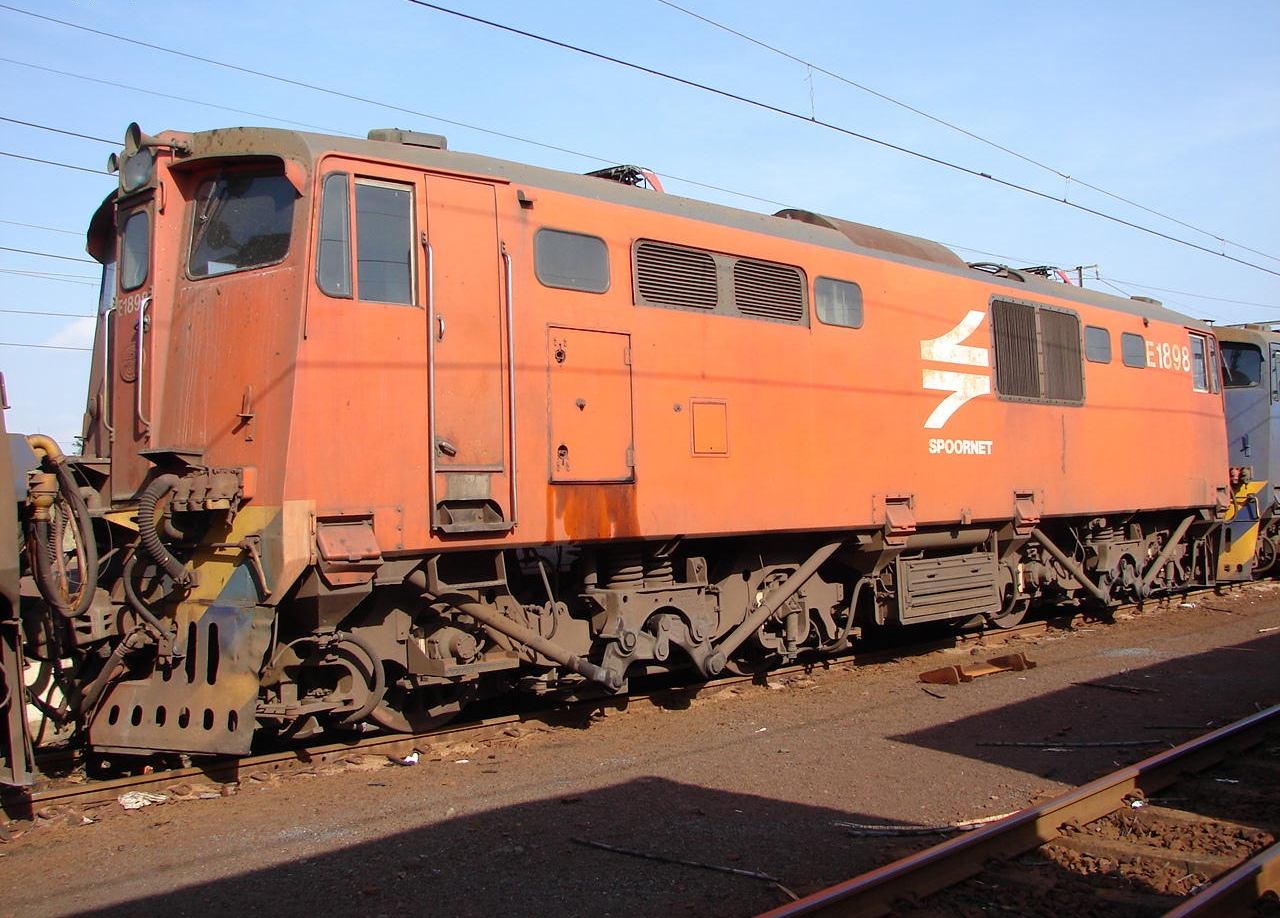
No. E1898 in Spoornet orange livery at Empangeni, KwaZulu-Natal, 14 August 2007

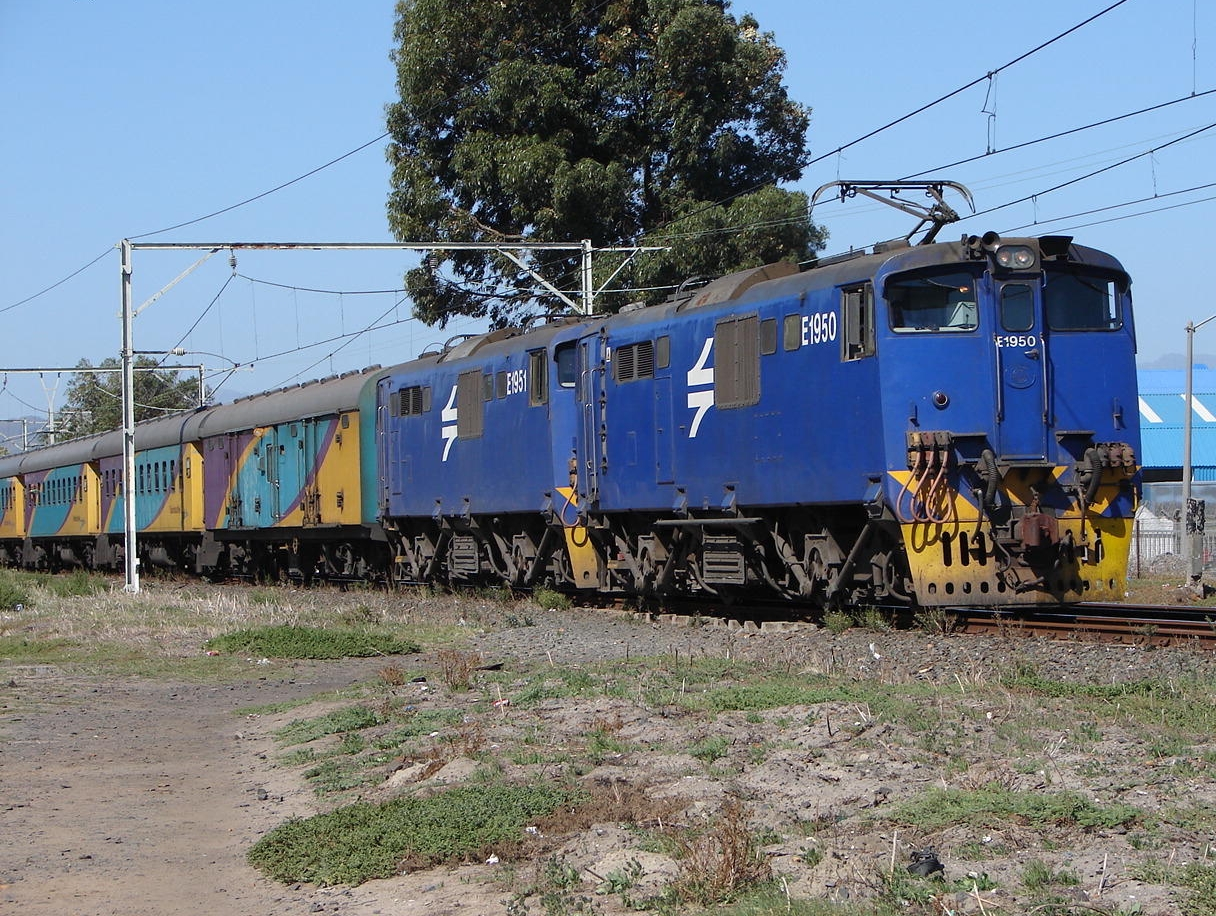
No. E1950 in Spoornet's maroon era Blue Train livery, Stikland, 13 March 2007

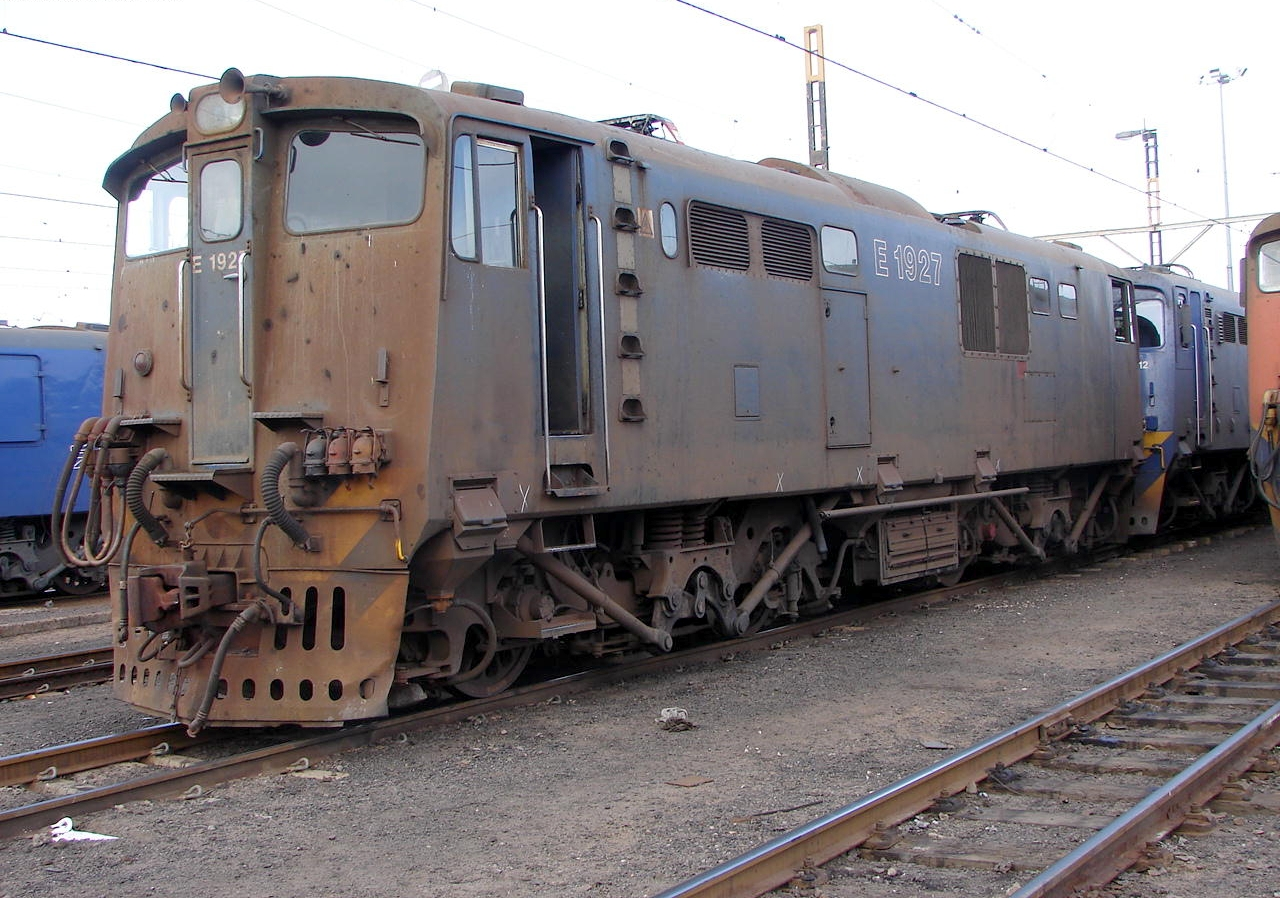
No. E1927 in Spoornet blue with outline numbers, Bayhead Loco, Durban, 11 August 2007

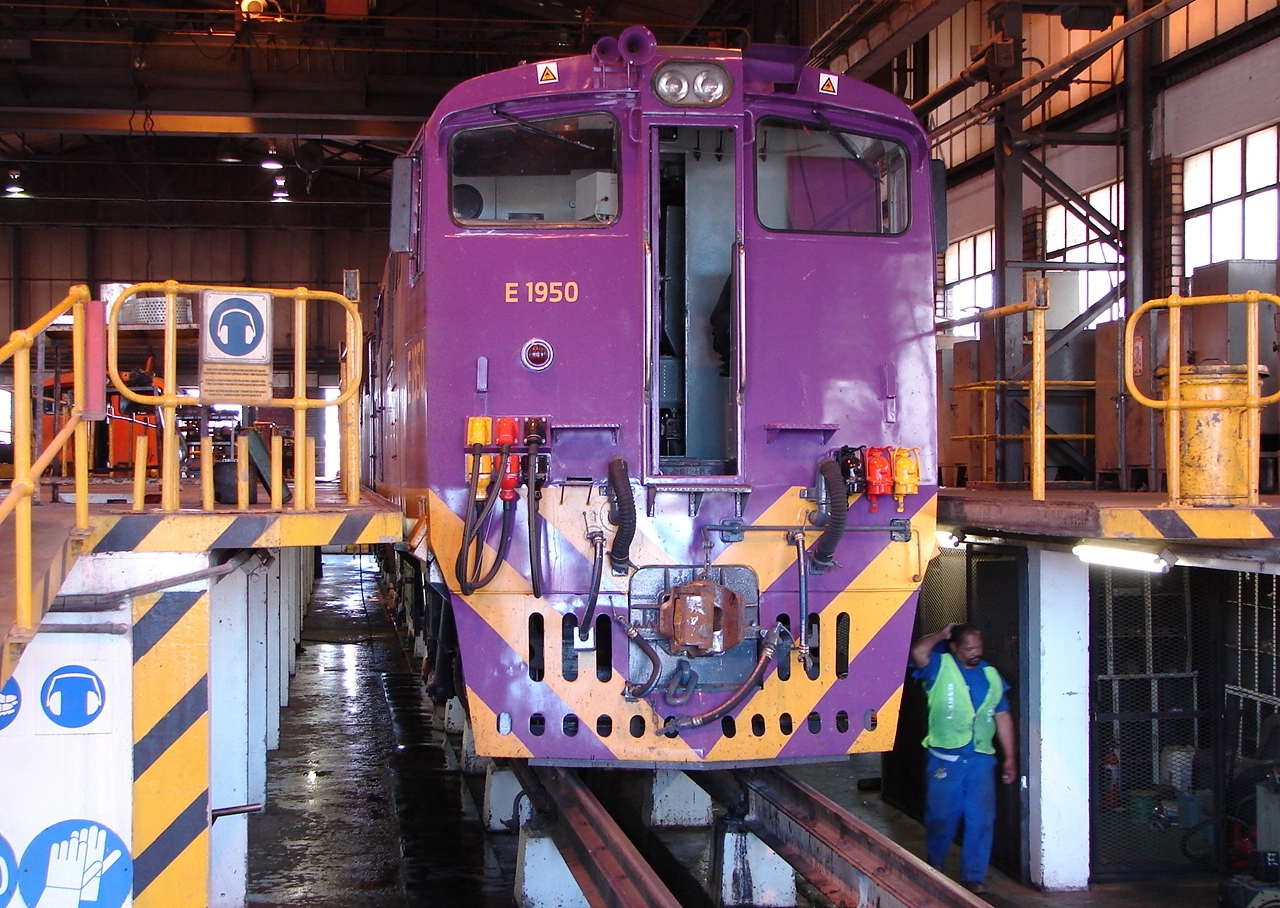
No. E1950 in PRASA's Shosholoza Meyl livery at Bellville Loco, Cape Town, 13 January 2010

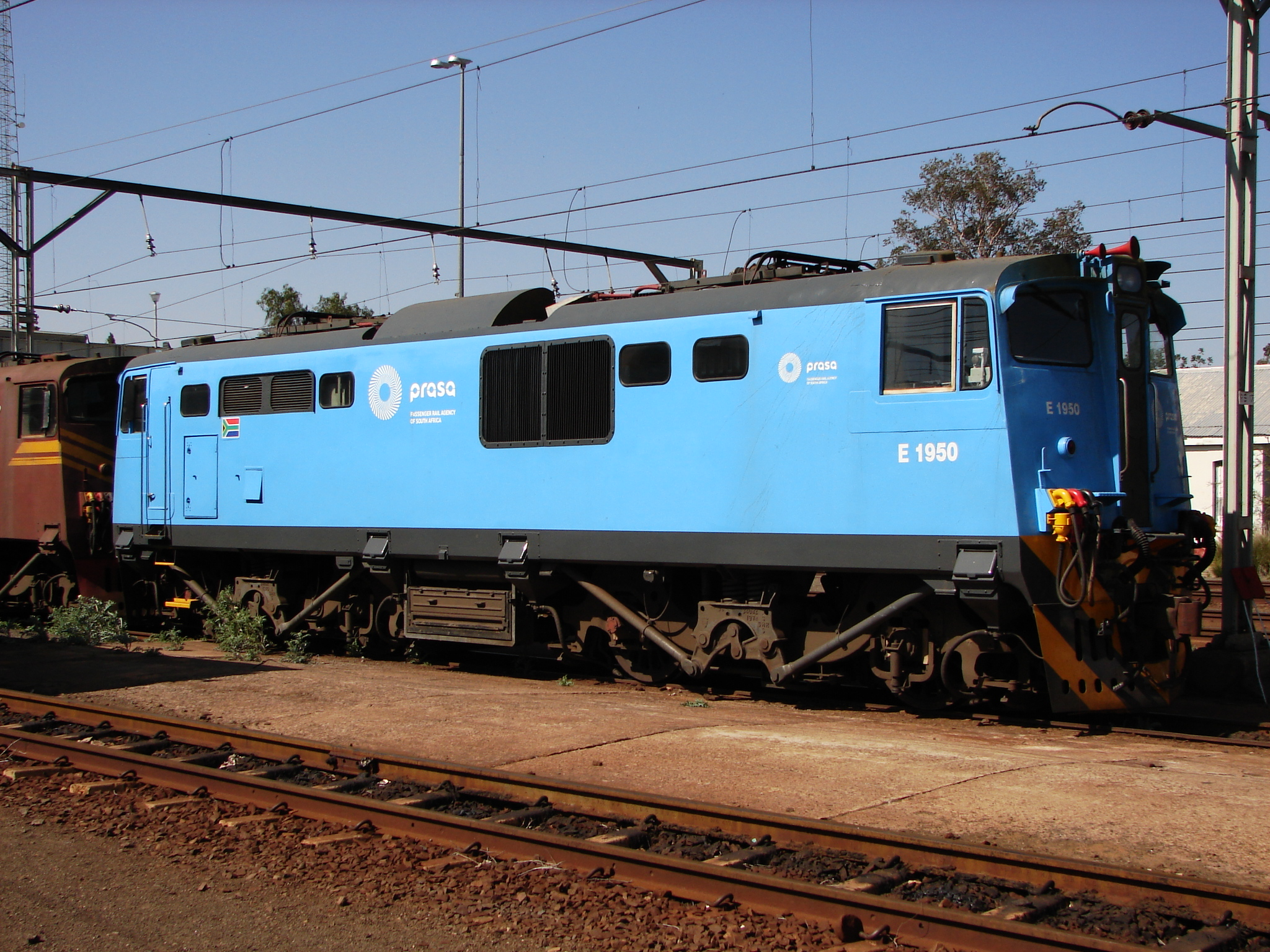
No. E1950 in PRASA's backdrop blue livery at Beaufort West, 15 September 2015
