= Lee-Ann Liebenberg =

South African model

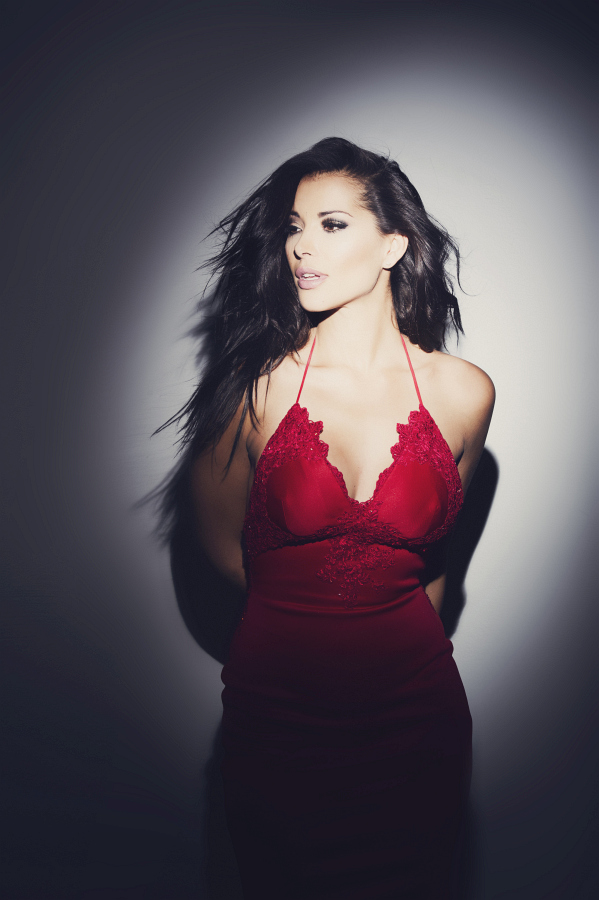
- Born: 9 December 1982 (age 43); Roodepoort, Transvaal, South Africa
- Occupation: Model
- Years active: 2005–present
- Spouse: Nicky van der Walt (m. 2011)
- Children: 3

Lee-Ann Liebenberg (born 9 December 1982) is a South African model. She is notable as 2005 FHM-South Africa's Sexiest Woman In the World. In 2013 she appeared on the inaugural cover of the South African edition of Maxim. She was featured in Sports Illustrated, Cosmopolitan, Women's Health and Marie Claire.

Liebenberg first drew public attention when she was selected as a Miss South Africa finalist, later voted FHM magazine's Sexiest Woman of 2005 and she remained on the list for over 10 consecutive years. She earned ten awards including six from You/Huisgenoot, two People Magazine Crystal Awards and two Heat Magazine Heat HOT 100 wins as Hottest SA Female Celebrity in 2007 and 2008. Lee-Ann and husband Nicky Van Der Walt were named YOU/Huisgenoot's Favorite Celebrity Couple of 2011 and 2012.

== Personal life ==
Liebenberg married Nicky van der Walt on 19 March 2011. The couple have two daughters and a son.
