= South African Class 9E, Series 2 =

Class of 6 South African electric locomotives

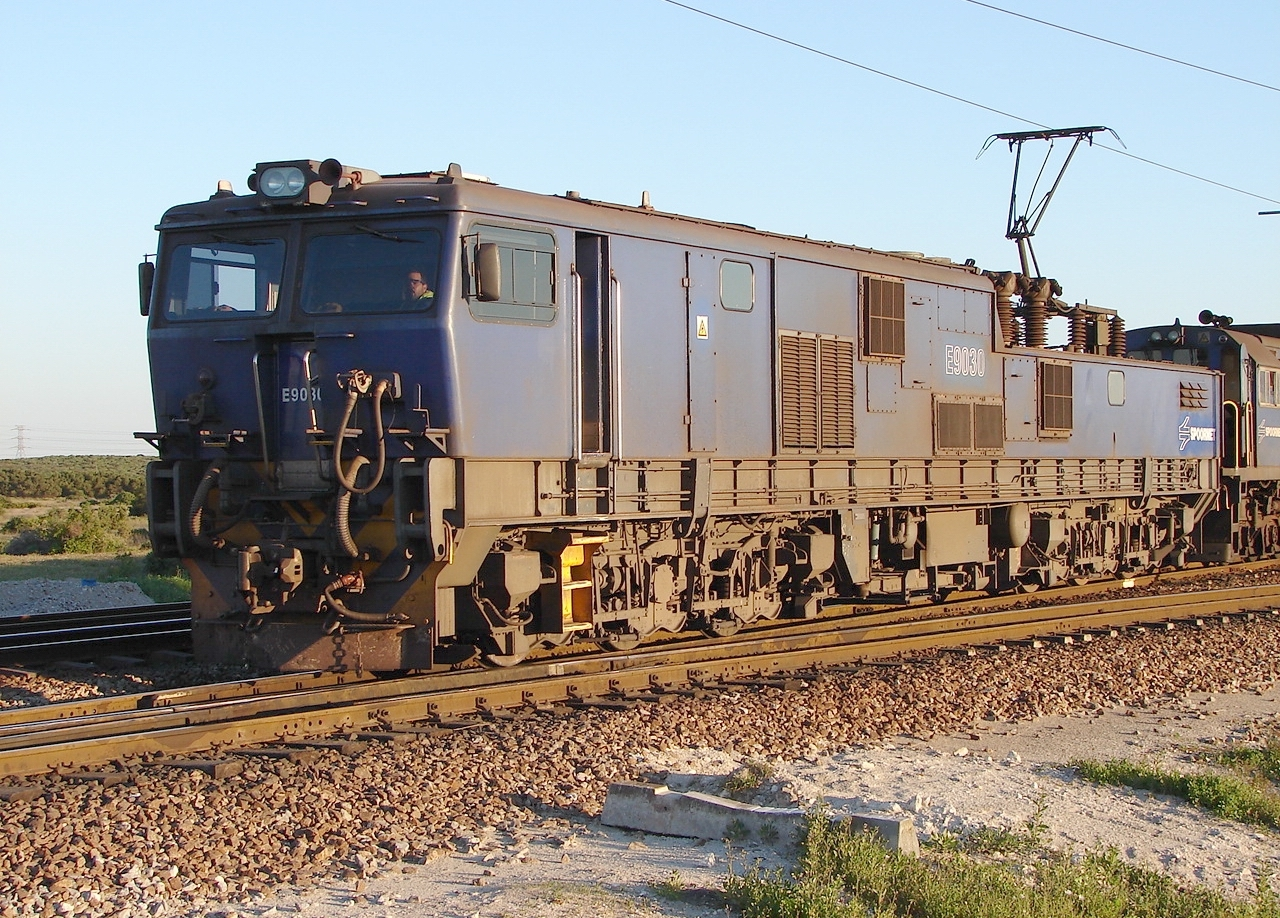
- E9030 at Saldanha, Western Cape in July 2009
Type and origin
- Power type: Electric
- Designer: General Electric Company
- Builder: Union Carriage & Wagon
- Serial number: 5595-5600
- Model: GEC 9E
- Build date: 1982-1983
- Total produced: 6
Specifications
- Configuration
  - AAR: C-C
  - UIC: Co'Co'
  - Commonwealth: Co-Co
- Gauge: 3 ft 6 in (1,067 mm) Cape gauge
- Wheel diameter: 1,220 mm (48.03 in)
- Wheelbase: 16,290 mm (641 3/8 in)
  - Bogie: 3,940 mm (12 ft 11 1/8 in)
- Pivot centres: 12,700 mm (41 ft 8 in)
- Length
  - Over couplers: 21,132 mm (69 ft 4 in)
  - Over beams: 20,120 mm (66 ft 1/8 in)
- Width: 2,900 mm (9 ft 6 1/8 in)
- Height
  - Pantograph: 3,900 mm (12 ft 9 1/2 in)
  - Body height: 3,900 mm (12 ft 9 1/2 in)
- Axle load: 28,000 kg (62,000 lb) max
- Adhesive weight: 166,300 kg (366,600 lb)
- Loco weight: 166,300 kg (366,600 lb)
- Electric system/s: 50 kV AC 50 Hz catenary
- Current pickup: Pantograph
- Traction motors: Six G415AZ
  - Rating 1 hour: 690 kW (930 hp)
  - Continuous: 640 kW (860 hp)
- Gear ratio: 18:83
- Loco brake: Air & Rheostatic
- Train brakes: Air & Vacuum; Wabco "Vaporid" air dryer
- Couplers: AAR knuckle
Performance figures
- Maximum speed: 90 km/h (56 mph)
- Power output
  - 1 hour: 4,140 kW (5,550 hp)
  - Continuous: 3,840 kW (5,150 hp)
- Tractive effort
  - Starting: 570 kN (130,000 lbf)
  - 1 hour: 483 kN (109,000 lbf)
  - Continuous: 388 kN (87,000 lbf)
Career
- Operators: South African Railways; Spoornet; Transnet Freight Rail
- Class: Class 9E
- Number in class: 6
- Numbers: E9026-E9031
- Locale: Sishen-Saldanha Orex line
- Delivered: 1982-1983
- First run: 1982

The South African Railways Class 9E, Series 2 of 1982 is an electric locomotive.

In 1982 and 1983, the South African Railways expanded its existing Class 9E fleet by placing six new Class 9E, Series 2 General Electric Company 50 kV AC electric locomotives with a Co-Co wheel arrangement in service on the Sishen-Saldanha iron ore line.

== Manufacturer ==
The 50 kV AC Class 9E, Series 2 electric locomotive was designed for the South African Railways (SAR) by the General Electric Company (GEC) and was built by Union Carriage & Wagon (UCW) in Nigel, Transvaal.

GEC works numbers were allocated to Class 9E locomotives. UCW delivered six locomotives in 1982 and 1983, numbered in the range from E9026 to E9031.

== Characteristics ==
The locomotive has a single full-width air-conditioned cab. At the rear end, the body work is lower to provide clearance for the 50 kV AC electrical equipment which is mounted on the roof. This consists of a single pantograph, a potential divider, a vacuum circuit breaker, a surge diverter and the main transformer’s high-voltage terminal. The electrical control system is solid state, using thyristors.

Since huge voltage drops are often encountered between electric sub-stations, the locomotive was designed to be able to operate on a supply varying between 55 and 25 kV AC. The battery boxes and the main air reservoirs are mounted between the bogies underneath the frame, where a compartment also houses a small motor scooter for use by the crew for lineside inspections of the train, which can be up to nearly 4 kilometres (2.5 miles) long.

Series 2 locomotives were delivered with five braking systems; air brakes for the locomotive, train air braking, train vacuum braking, a handbrake and dynamic rheostatic braking which can dissipate 4,200 kilowatts (5,600 horsepower). The Series 1 locomotives were delivered without a vacuum brake system.

By 2007, the entire fleet of both series of Class 9E electric locomotives were upgraded with Alstom's Agate train control and communication technology. The pantographs on most of these locomotives were also replaced by the single-arm type.

The Series 1 and Series 2 Class 9Es can be visually distinguished from each other by their bogies, which were redesigned for the Series 2 locomotives.

== Service ==
Class 9E locomotives are used on the 861-kilometre-long (535-mile) Sishen-Saldanha iron ore line to haul export ore from the open-cast iron mines at Sishen in the Northern Cape to the harbour at Saldanha in the Western Cape. Most of the route is across the hot and dry Northern Cape, but the last 75 kilometres (47 miles) to Saldanha runs parallel to the Atlantic coastline and is subjected to the fog and corrosive sea air of the West Coast.

== Liveries ==
The whole series was delivered in the SAR red oxide livery with signal red cowcatchers, yellow whiskers and with the number plates on the sides mounted on three-stripe yellow wings. In the late 1990s they were all repainted in the Spoornet blue livery with either solid or outline numbers on the sides.

== Illustration ==
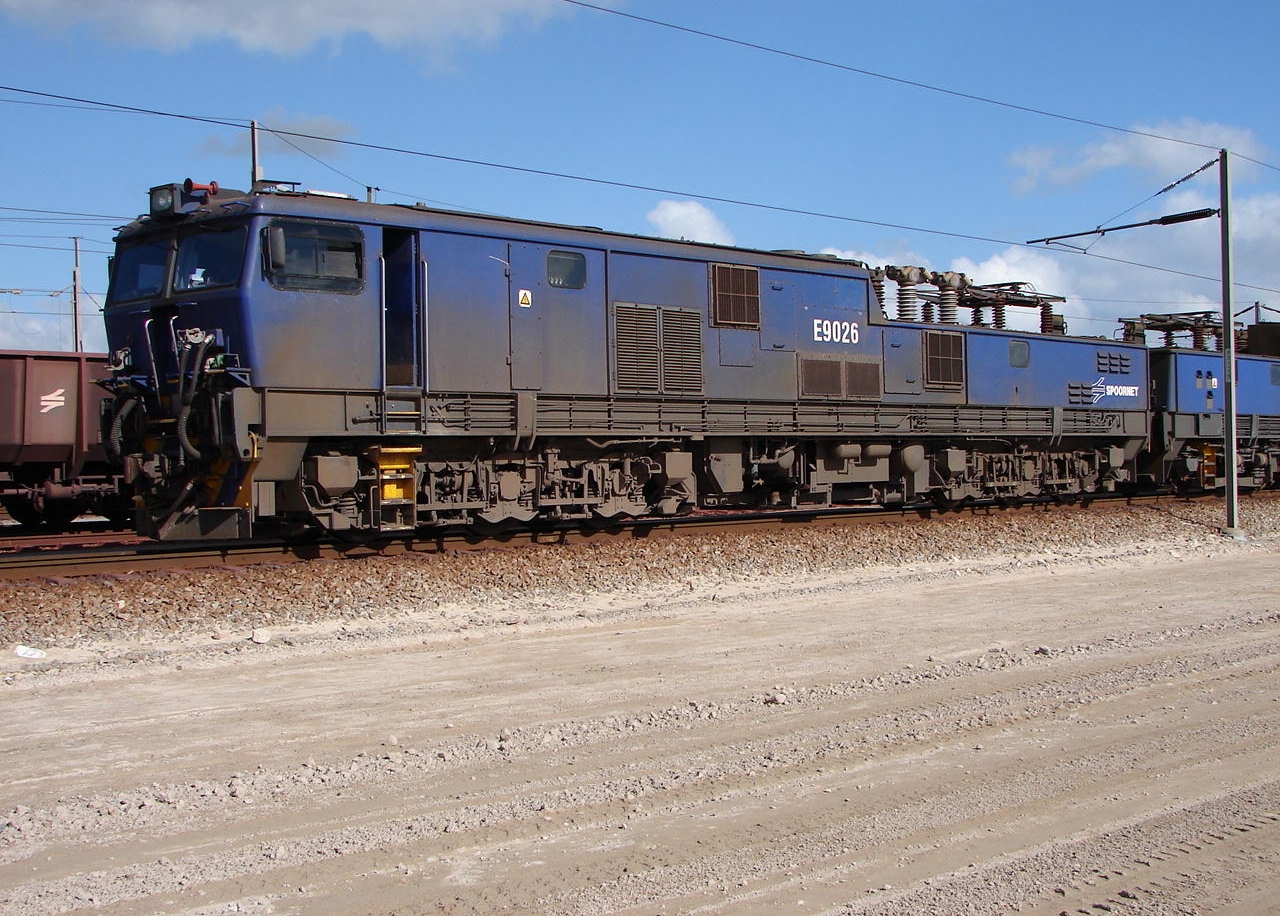
No. E9026 in Spoornet blue with solid numbers at Saldanha, 12 September 2007

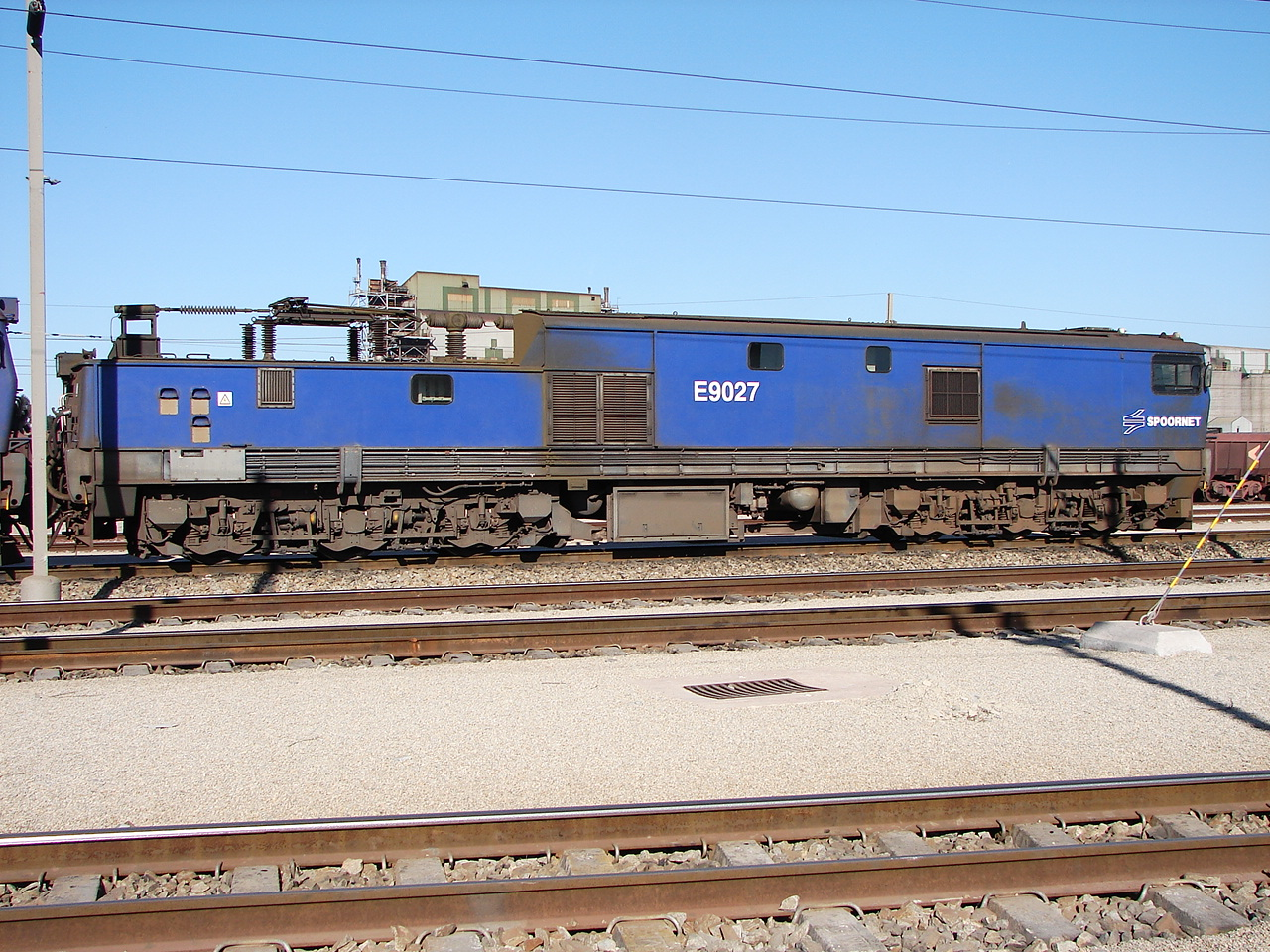
Right side view of no. E9027, Salkor yard, Saldanha, 14 July 2011

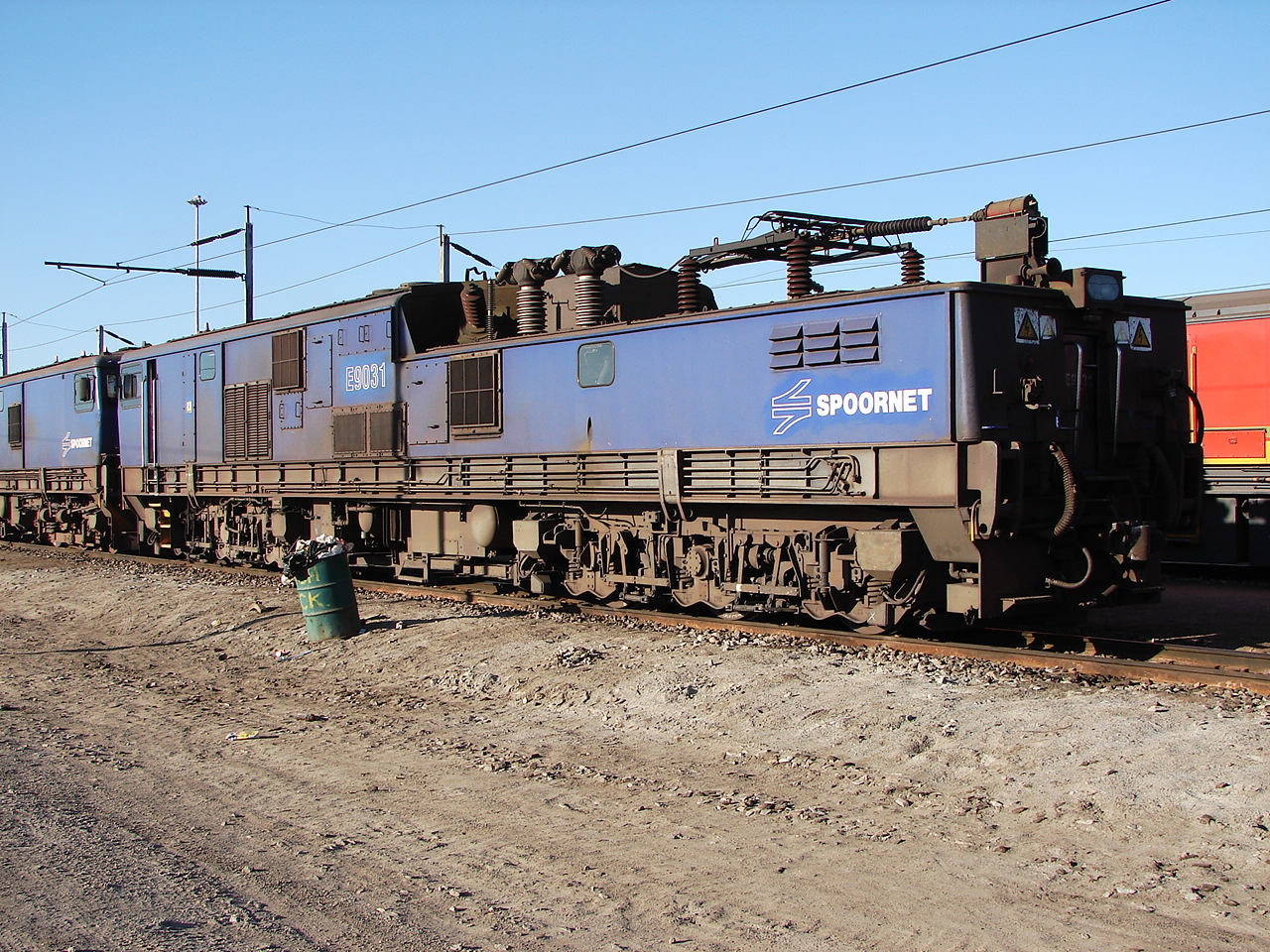
Rear end view of no. E9031, Salkor yard, Saldanha, 14 July 2011
