= Operation Seiljag =

South African search and destroy campaign

- Part of the South African Border War
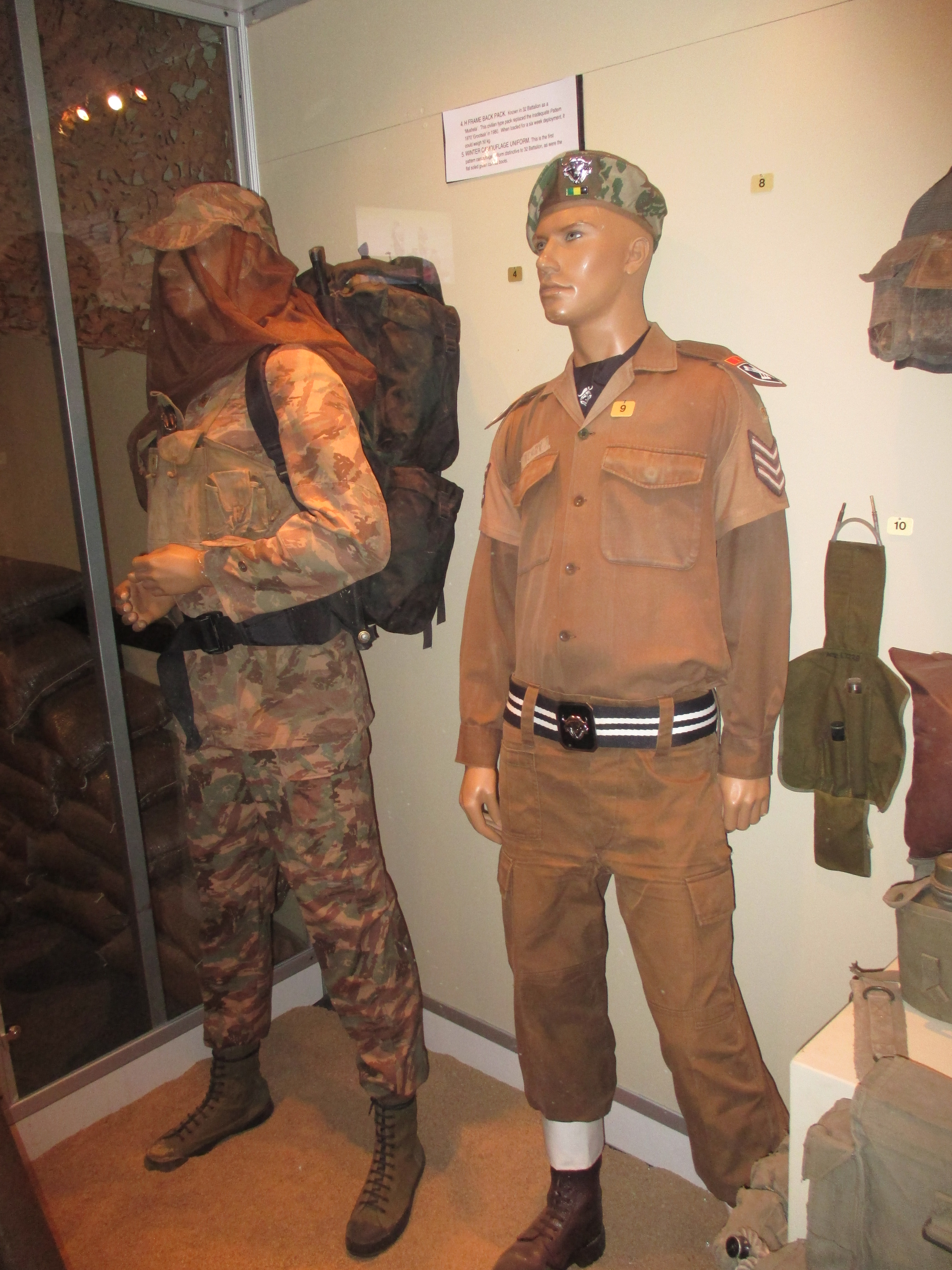
- 32 Battalion uniforms worn during Seiljag. To help keep their activities covert, the unit's personnel wore ubiquitous lizardstripe camouflage in Angola which mimicked Angolan military battledress. While operating in Ovamboland, 32 operators used the standard issue SADF brown fatigues.
Date	1 November 1976 – 31 March 1977 (4 months, 4 weeks and 2 days)
Location	Angola; South West Africa (Namibia)
Result	Indecisive

Belligerents
South Africa	South West African People's Organization

Commanders and leaders
(South Africa) Col. Jan Breytenbach (South Africa) Lt. Gerrit Keulder † (South Africa) Lt. Des Burman	Unknown

Strength
Several infantry platoons 1 Bosvark; 5 Unimog trucks	445 guerrillas

Casualties and losses
3 killed	19+ killed 1+ wounded

Operation Seiljag was a South African 32 Battalion search and destroy campaign conducted against the People's Liberation Army of Namibia (PLAN) from November 1976 to March 1977, during the South African Border War. It was carried out from November 1976 to March 1977 largely on the Yati Strip, a region patrolled by South African security forces parallel to the Angolan border. By February, the fighting had intensified and shifted to about fourteen kilometres into Angola. In the course of a four-month period 32 Battalion had eliminated two PLAN sections, repelled a third incursion across the border, and destroyed three militant bases. The bodies of nineteen guerrillas were recovered, in addition to a cache of mortar bombs and RPG-7 projectiles intended for use on PLAN raids.

Operation Seiljag was one of the largest actions involving 32 Battalion at that point, involving firefights with up to three hundred insurgents. Casualties were relatively light on both sides.

== Background ==
=== Military situation ===
South Africa fought a long and bitter counter-insurgency conflict in South West Africa from 1966 to 1989, just prior to that country's independence as Namibia. On a strategic level, the South African government was at a unique disadvantage: its continued rule over South West Africa, under the auspices of a defunct League of Nations mandate granted shortly after World War I, was regarded internationally as an illegal, pseudo-colonial occupation. South Africa also drew criticism for imposing its policy of racial apartheid on its mandate, which provoked dissent and helped gave rise to an insurgency by the Marxist South West African People's Organisation (SWAPO). SWAPO demanded that all South African military and paramilitary units be withdrawn and replaced with a multinational United Nations mission to oversee elections. It also insisted on the relinquishment of Walvis Bay, an enclave then regarded as an integral part of South Africa.

In 1975, the collapse of Portuguese colonial rule in neighbouring Angola allowed members of SWAPO's militant arm, the People's Liberation Army of Namibia (PLAN) to begin using Angolan sanctuaries near the southern border as forward operating bases. The South African Defence Force (SADF) soon found itself confronted with an ever-increasing number of well-armed guerrillas infiltrating by the hundreds across the porous frontier. Unwilling to accept a purely defensive posture, South African patrols began crossing into Angola to stop PLAN cadres before they could reach their targets. An interim solution to solving the manpower problem also emerged via the growing recruitment of black and coloured soldiers by the SADF. The first South African army unit which permitted black personnel to serve in a combat role was 32 Battalion, led by Colonel Jan Breytenbach. Breytenbach had encouraged a number of partisans loyal to the demobilised National Liberation Front of Angola, an armed faction opposed to Angola's leftist government, to seek refuge in South West Africa. He then ordered them retrained, re-equipped, and formed into a new fighting unit led by white South African officers. Under his unorthodox leadership the battalion was tasked with denying PLAN freedom of movement within a zone roughly fifty kilometres north of the Angolan border.

32 Battalion's first engagement with PLAN occurred on 17 May 1976, south of Cahana Hangadima, Angola, when guerrillas attacked an encampment of unit members and South African special forces in the night. The insurgents suffered heavy casualties and withdrew, while the South African platoon returned to its base a few weeks later without reporting further contact.

=== Prelude ===
In November 1976, Colonel Breytenbach issued his second deployment order aimed at preventing further PLAN infiltration into South West Africa. Breytenbach recognised that PLAN held the initiative, and he intended to wrest it from them with an aggressive preemptive strike strategy. Several 32 Battalion platoons, alternatively answering to the SADF command in Ovamboland or special forces headquarters, were to sweep the Yati Strip and surrounding region for PLAN camps. The minimal deployment period allocated for this operation was three months.

The Yati Strip was an area cleared by the SADF just one kilometre south of Angola, running parallel to the border. Platoons were typically deposited there by vehicles carrying a limited supply of food and ammunition. Operators then cached the bulk of their supplies at a position of their choice and carried on with their patrols relatively unhindered. The cache was booby trapped with anti-personnel mines. PLAN had a heavy presence in the area: at the time of deployment at least one cadre was there seeking water. Other insurgents were frequently crossing into Angola from South West Africa, presumably for resupply, before returning there again. They were in collusion with Angolan civilians.

== Operation ==
On the 26 November, the first 32 Battalion platoon observed six PLAN guerrillas at a watering hole on the edge of Chana Onaimbungu. This was three kilometres south of the border and well within South West African territory. The South Africans deployed into a sweep line and advanced to within fifty metres of the unsuspecting militants before opening fire. The insurgents made no attempt to resist, but fled towards the western bush. In their haste they inadvertently collided with a second platoon to the northwest less than an hour later. The insurgents were killed when they entered the South Africans' camp. Both platoon leaders made contact and agreed that they had probably encountered the same group.

In mid-December, Colonel Breytenbach's brother Cloete, a journalist for The Sunday Times, arrived in South West Africa to do a story on the war. He requested an opportunity to see the operational area and was permitted to photograph 32 Battalion in action as long as he refrained from publishing the unit's name or any details of its deployment. Cloete received his opportunity on 23 December, when an SADF supply convoy spotted suspicious tracks entering Ovamboland. A 32 Battalion member, Tony Viera, followed the tracks two kilometres into Angola and observed seven insurgents mingling with civilians north of Chapa Lupale. His platoon deployed around the fringe of the settlement and crawled to within seventy metres of the guerrillas. In the ensuing firefight six of the seven were shot dead. Cloete Breytenbach published an exclusive report on the action when he returned to Johannesburg. This was the first time that 32 Battalion had been publicly photographed.

On Christmas Day PLAN retaliated by attacking another 32 Battalion platoon a kilometre south of the border. The guerrillas were repelled back across the border with no casualties, and January 1977 passed almost without incident. On 19 February the South Africans located more suspicious tracks and not long after seven that evening two platoons led personally by Colonel Breytenbach followed them into Angola. There was a full moon which afforded excellent visibility; even without adequate night vision equipment Breytenbach's men were able to locate the target cadres near a waterhole. The insurgents fought back with surprising ferocity and mortally wounded a 32 Battalion operator before escaping. In the aftermath of the skirmish two insurgent dead were recovered as well as a cache of arms which included five PG-7V rockets and six 60mm mortar bombs.

Sporadic engagements continued to be reported as 32 Battalion began actively searching out PLAN's forward operating bases. The first was discovered on the 22 February, when a sweep in the vicinity of Chana Henombe encountered one two kilometres southeast of the village. A 32 Battalion platoon stumbled into the camp's trench network and an estimated 100 insurgents responded to the scene with RPG-7s and small arms. The platoon also reported coming under heavy mortar fire. After ten minutes of shooting, the insurgents escaped unharmed into the bush and scattered. A second platoon led by Lieutenant Gerrit "Gert" Keulder also investigated Chana Mamuandi, arriving there on March 1. Their patrol made contact with a PLAN patrol, which immediately broke and ran. Seven nights later, 32 Battalion also combed Chana Hangadima but reported no sign of the enemy. By noon the following day the platoons had swept the fringe of Chana Henombe without encountering resistance. Keulder found an abandoned PLAN base in the Nutalala area and destroyed it. As the South Africans prepared to depart in the late afternoon, they were engaged by about 300 insurgents mounting a counterattack. The PLAN group mortally wounded Lieutenant Keulder before withdrawing, leaving their five dead behind them. At this point it became clear that PLAN either lacked the willingness or capability to fight sustained engagements, as even when 32 Battalion was outnumbered and outgunned their assailants would only exchange fire for about ten minutes. The insurgents would then disappear into the bush. Similar tactics were observed in the closing weeks of Seiljag – for instance, when sweeping a final PLAN base on the Huavala River a Lieutenant Des Burman's platoon encountered token opposition from guerrillas in a fortified trench complex. Despite initially responding with machine gun fire and RPGs, PLAN soon abandoned its advantageous position and retreated to the northwest. The South Africans scoured the trenches and found them to be one and a half metres deep, sprawling over a single piece of ground one hundred and fifty metres in diameter and bolstered with camouflaged bunkers. Some Angolan civilians had also resided in them. According to their accounts the particular base had been constructed three months prior. Male PLAN recruits tended to their fields by day and returned to sleep in their bunkers by night.

Late March saw 32 Battalion beginning to move out once more; by the end of the month the platoons were back in South West Africa, having been relieved by fresh troops. Operation Seiljag was over.

== Aftermath ==
Between November 1976 and March 1977 32 Battalion had accounted for at least 19 insurgents at the expense of three of their own. Besides Lieutenant Keulder, another white operator, Rifleman Christiaan Johannes Swart, had been killed on the 31 December. One of Colonel Breytenbach's platoon also died in the fighting on the 19 February. The capture of insurgent arms had been negligible, since most of the PLAN's materiel was located much further to the north in secure bases. By the end of 1977 it was clear that the South African government would have to take stronger action to curb insurgent activity. On 25 October 1977, the SADF claimed that there were 300 PLAN militants in the operational area and skirmishes with security forces averaged a hundred a month. A further 2,000 PLAN troops were active in Angola and 1,400 in Zambia near the Caprivi Strip. Not long after this statement was released, an exceptionally large PLAN force of over 80 insurgents was able to infiltrate the border. The SADF was concerned that such raids could be indicative of a PLAN strategy to increase its semi-conventional capabilities and operate in larger groups. For over a decade South Africa had concentrated on a counter-insurgency doctrine based on fighting small, lightly armed, and relatively disorganised partisans. PLAN's decision to escalate the war had forced a change in priorities; comparatively limited actions such as Operation Seiljag were no longer regarded as adequate.

On 4 May 1978, the SADF responded with Operation Reindeer, which involved regular airborne and mechanised units being deployed into Angola on a conventional scale for the first time. Five rifle companies of 32 Battalion took part in this operation.

Operation Seiljag was followed by two similar search and destroy operations, Operation Buckshot and Operation Seiljag II.
