= Cristina Boshoff =

South African folk pop singer and pianist

Katarina Boshoff
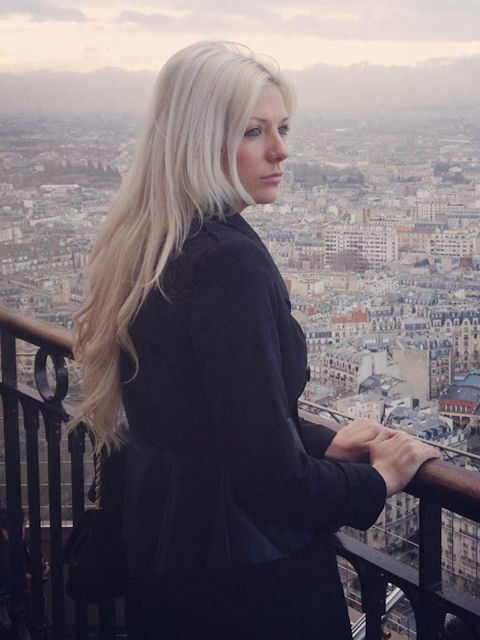
- Cristina Boshoff in September 2012

Background information
- Born: 8 October 1980 (age 45); Stellenbosch, Western Cape, South Africa
- Genres: Folk pop
- Occupation: Singer
- Years active: 1998–present
- Label: Black Tulip Productions
- Website: www.katarinaboshoff.com

Katarina Boshoff (born 8 October 1980 as Katarina Cristina Boshoff) is a South African folk pop singer and pianist based in Cape Town.

Boshoff was born in Stellenbosch, and holds dual citizenship in South Africa and Spain. She began playing piano at the age of 12, and received her first recording contract at the age of 18. Katarina is partly South African, partly Dutch.

== Music ==
Boshoff released her debut single, "I'm only human" in 1999. The single topped the South African National Campus Charts. It spent 9 weeks on the South African National Top 40 Charts, where it peaked at the number six position. In 2000 she followed the single with her debut album, This is me.

=== Studio albums ===
- This is me (2000)
- Fire & Ice (2014)
- Me and Missy D. (2015)

=== Singles ===
- "I'm only human" (1999)
- "You're my shoulder" (2000)
- "I feel like a wreck" (2003)
- "Try" (2010)
- "A Rainy Day" (2014)
- "Tears of an Angel" (2014)
- "Why" (2014)
- "I dare you" (2015)
- "Gonna be with you" (2015)
- "Dreams" (2014)
