= Operation Beanbag =

Military operation by the South African Defense Forces in 1981

- Part of Internal resistance to apartheid
- Operation Beanbag (Mozambique)
| Date | 30 January 1981 |
| Location | Maputo, Matola, Mozambique |
| Result | South African victory |

Belligerents
| South Africa | ANC (Umkhonto we Sizwe) |

Commanders and leaders
| (South Africa) Unknown | Unknown |

Units involved
| SADF | Unknown |

Strength
| ~20 | Unknown |

Casualties and losses
| 2 killed 1 MIA (presumed dead) | 16 killed |
- 1 civilian killed (Mozambique)

Operation Beanbag, also known as the Matola Raid, was a military operation conducted by the South African Defence Force (SADF) against suspected safe houses of uMkhonto we Sizwe (MK), armed wing of the African National Congress (ANC), in Matola, Mozambique. The operation was authorised by Prime Minister P.W. Botha.

== Background ==
SADF intelligence identified a network of ANC safe houses in Matola as MK's planning headquarters for guerrilla operations in Transvaal Province, South Africa. The South African team was made up of members from 1 and 6 Reconnaissance Regiments, the latter being made up of old Rhodesian SAS personnel. The operation was carried out on 30 January 1981, specifically targeting three houses in the Maputo suburb of Matola.

The Mozambican government claims that the twenty SADF special forces members were driven from the border in vehicles that resembled Mozambican army vehicles. One part of the team maintained a roadblock on the main road between Maputo and Matola, while a second team attacked the three ANC buildings. A firefight broke out between the SADF and the ANC inhabitants. The reconnaissance team took two prisoners during the attack. The reconnaissance teams rejoined and returned to the border with South Africa and were said to have been withdrawn by helicopter.

== Aftermath ==
The SADF lost three personnel, one of whom could not be found during the withdrawal at the end of the operation and he was left behind. 6 Reconnaissance Regiment was disbanded later during the year and the remaining members integrated into the remaining special forces regiments. The SADF claimed to have killed 30 MK militants. The Mozambican government estimated a death toll of 11, including a civilian killed in the crossfire. In its review of Operation Beanbag, the Truth and Reconciliation Commission found that the raid resulted in the deaths of 16 MK members, including 4 senior militant commanders, some of whom were killed during the attack and others who died of their injuries later. The TRC also noted that a civilian was killed, possibly by accident, at the SADF roadblock. The dead civilian was a Portuguese citizen who bore a close resemblance to prominent ANC official Joe Slovo, leading the party's supporters to speculate his death was the result of mistaken identity.

ANC president Oliver Tambo subsequently issued a statement implying that Operation Beanbag had targeted unarmed civilian refugees rather than legitimate military targets. He denied that the ANC and MK had any guerrilla camps in Mozambique.

The raid was condemned by the United Nations as a violation of Mozambique's territorial integrity.
