= South African Class 12E =

Train

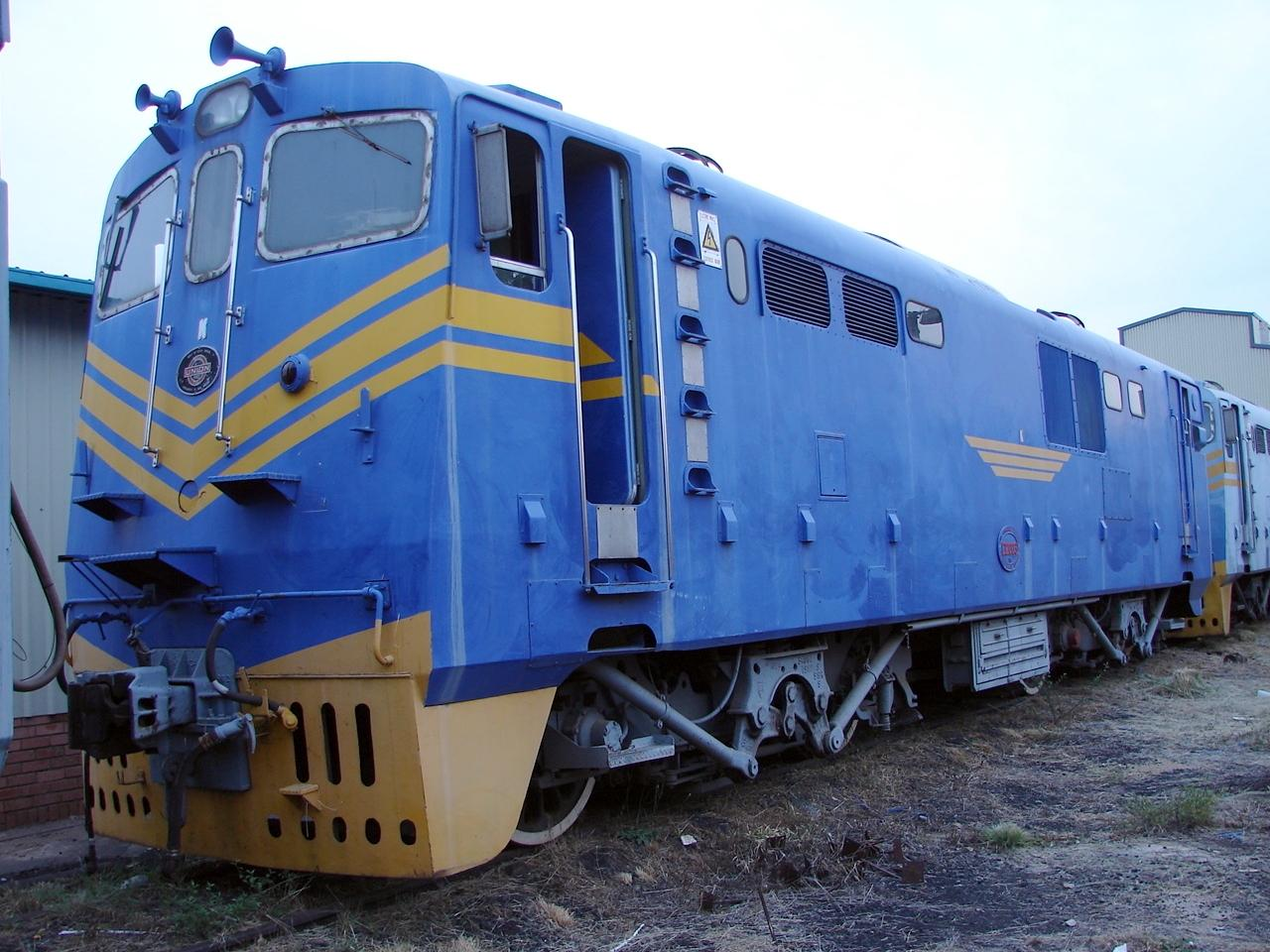
- No. 12-003 at Koedoespoort, Pretoria, 2 October 2009
Type and origin
- Power type: Electric
- Designer: Union Carriage & Wagon
- Builder: Union Carriage & Wagon
- Model: UCW 12E
- Build date: 1982–1983
- Total produced: 5
Specifications
- Configuration
  - AAR: B-B
  - UIC: Bo'Bo'
  - Commonwealth: Bo-Bo
- Gauge: 3 ft 6 in (1,067 mm) Cape gauge
- Wheel diameter: 1,220 mm (48.03 in)
- Wheelbase: 11,278 mm (37 ft 0 in)
  - Bogie: 3,430 mm (11 ft 3 in)
- Pivot centres: 7,848 mm (25 ft 9 in)
- Panto shoes: 7,731 mm (25 ft 4 3/8 in)
- Length
  - Over couplers: 15,522 mm (50 ft 11 1/8 in)
  - Over body: 14,630 mm (48 ft 0 in)
- Width: 2,896 mm (9 ft 6 in)
- Height
  - Pantograph: 4,127 mm (13 ft 6 1/2 in)
  - Body height: 3,937 mm (12 ft 11 in)
- Axle load: 20,900 kg (46,100 lb)
- Adhesive weight: 83,600 kg (184,300 lb)
- Loco weight: 83,600 kg (184,300 lb)
- Electric system/s: 3 kV DC catenary
- Current pickup(s): Pantographs
- Traction motors: Four AEI-283AY
  - Rating 1 hour: 623 kW (835 hp)
  - Continuous: 563 kW (755 hp)
- Gear ratio: 23:66
- Loco brake: Air & Regenerative
- Train brakes: Air
- Couplers: AAR knuckle
Performance figures
- Maximum speed: 150 km/h (93 mph)
- Power output
  - 1 hour: 2,492 kW (3,342 hp)
  - Continuous: 2,252 kW (3,020 hp)
- Tractive effort
  - Starting: 240 kN (54,000 lbf)
  - 1 hour: 170 kN (38,000 lbf)
  - Continuous: 149 kN (33,000 lbf)
Career
- Operators: South African Railways; Spoornet; Transnet Freight Rail
- Class: Class 12E
- Number in class: 5
- Numbers: 12-001 - 12-005
- Delivered: 1983
- First run: 1983

The South African Railways Class 12E of 1983 was an electric locomotive.

On 16 January 1984, the South African Railways inaugurated the MetroBlitz high speed interurban train service between Pretoria and Johannesburg. Five Class 12E electric locomotives with a Bo-Bo wheel arrangement that entered service in 1983 were designed and built specifically for the MetroBlitz.

== Manufacturer ==
The 3 kV DC Class 12E electric passenger locomotive was designed and built for the South African Railways (SAR) by Union Carriage & Wagon (UCW) in Nigel, Transvaal, with electrical equipment supplied by General Electric Company (GEC). It was a modified single-cab version of the Class 6E1, Series 10 locomotive and was specially designed and built for use with the MetroBlitz, a high speed passenger commuter train which ran daily between Pretoria and Johannesburg with effect from 16 January 1984.

Five locomotives were delivered by UCW in 1983, numbered in the range from 12-001 to 12-005. Like the Class 6E1, Series 6 to 10, the Class 12E units were equipped with AEI-283AY traction motors. UCW did not allocate builder's numbers to the locomotives it built for the SAR, but used the SAR unit numbers for their record keeping.

== Characteristics ==
Based on the dual cab Class 6E1 locomotive, the Class 12E was a single-cab locomotive with a conductor's cabin at the rear end. They were used with specially designed suburban passenger coaches which rode on air-sprung disk-braked high speed Scheffel bogies. The MetroBlitz operated with two locomotives per train, one unit at each end, which made dual cabs unnecessary.

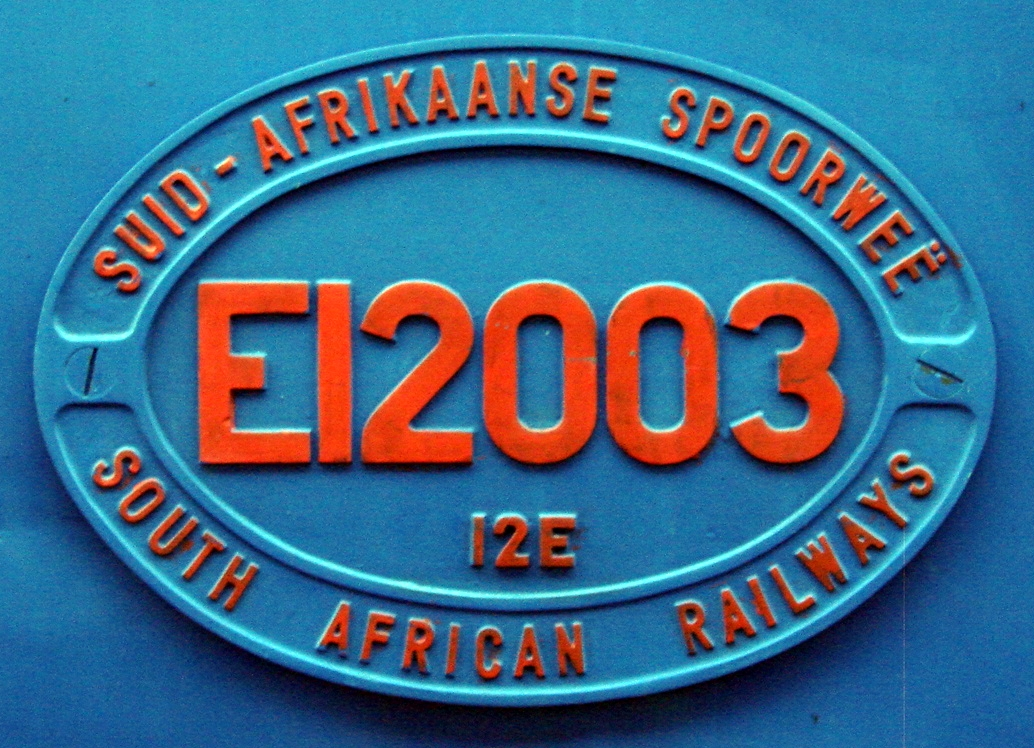

Like the Class 6E1, the Class 12E was built with sophisticated traction linkages on their bogies. Together with the locomotive's electronic wheel-slip detection system these traction struts, mounted between the linkages on the bogies and the locomotive body and colloquially referred to as grasshopper legs, ensured the maximum transfer of power to the rails without causing wheel-slip by reducing the adhesion of the leading bogie and increasing that of the trailing bogie by as much as 15% upon starting. This feature was controlled by electronic wheel-slip detection devices and an electric weight transfer relay which reduced the anchor current to the leading bogie by as much as 50A in notches 2 to 16.

The Class 12E had the same power output as a Class 6E1, but with a higher gear ratio of 23:66 compared to the 18:67 of the Class 6E1. This enabled it to run at a safe maximum speed of 150 kilometres per hour (93 miles per hour). Since it was designed for suburban service, sanding gear was deemed unnecessary and was not installed on the Class 12E, as evident from the absence of the sandbox lids seen along the bottom body sides of most Class 6E1 locomotives. This turned out to be a disadvantage when they were eventually allocated to mainline service to haul the Blue Train.

== Service ==
The MetroBlitz was made possible by the high speed tests which were carried out by Dr. Herbert Scheffel in 1978 and which culminated in the still unbeaten world speed record of 245 kilometres per hour (152 miles per hour) on Cape gauge, set by Class 6E1, Series 4 no. E1525 on 31 October 1978.

The MetroBlitz replaced the Jacaranda Express, a limited-stop commuter train which ran between Pretoria and Johannesburg. It was planned to implement similar high speed services at other major centres and also to expand the Pretoria-Johannesburg service to run through to other centres like Bloemfontein in the Free State, a trip which was calculated to be possible in as little as three and a half hours at high speed.

On 11 January 1984, prior to the introduction of the scheduled Metroblitz service between Pretoria and Johannesburg, a test Metroblitz train was run from Pretoria to Johannesburg and then from Johannesburg to Bloemfontein to evaluate the potential and impact of longer distance high speed train services. The run to Bloemfontein was a success with the trip from Johannesburg taking 3 hours 46 minutes, but such a service was never implemented. Factors against it were:

- Running high speed passenger trains would require significant infrastructure expenditure, especially to eliminate or safeguard level crossings and upgrade the track.
- The difficulty in scheduling slower trains on the same network so as to avoid capacity restrictions.
- Dwindling long-distance passenger numbers in favour of air, bus and minibus taxi transport.

The MetroBlitz service between Pretoria and Johannesburg was discontinued after little more than a year, its demise officially being blamed on poor cost recovery. Major factors in the failure of the high speed service were, on the one hand, the disruption of other train traffic which shared the same line and which had to have their schedules adapted to accommodate the MetroBlitz, and on the other hand the inability to operate at its full potential speed as a result of having to share the line.

== Liveries ==
The Class 12E was delivered in a special livery for the Metroblitz, charcoal grey all over with a red cowcatcher and lower sides, in line with the red lower sides on the passenger coaches. It had yellow and red whiskers wrapped around to the sides and tapering off towards the rear, and two tapered yellow lines on the sides in line with the yellow lines above and beneath the windows on the coaches.

After the MetroBlitz service came to an end in 1985, the five Class 12E locomotives were repainted blue with yellow whiskers and replaced Class 6E1 numbers E1341 to E1345 as Blue Train locomotives between Pretoria and Kimberley. Probably at the same time, their original unpierced cowcatchers were replaced with ones with a pattern of holes, similar to those used on the Class 5E and Class 6E families but slanted back towards the front bogies.

They worked the Blue Train between Pretoria and Kimberley until about 2005, when that function was taken over by the dual voltage Classes 14E and 14E1. These were able to work the Blue Train over the full distance between Johannesburg and Cape Town across the 25 kV section between Kimberley and De Aar as well as on other electrified routes. All five Class 12E locomotives were then staged at the Koedoespoort shops in Pretoria.

== Disposal ==
All five locomotives were put up for auction in a single lot at a starting price of R424,000 during TFR Sale 30 of 5 July 2012. They were sold on 5 July 2012 for R1,310,000, a high price of R3,469 per ton due to the copper content in the traction motors. The sale appears to have fallen through, however, since besides being observed to be still at Koedoespoort during 2014, they reappeared in TFR Sale 119 of 29 February 2016. They were again shown as being sold, but no information as to either their further employment or scrapping is known.

== The Gautrain ==
The MetroBlitz linked Pretoria and Johannesburg with a travelling time of 42 minutes, reaching speeds of 160 kilometres per hour (99 miles per hour) while having to contend with other mixed traffic on 3 ft 6 in (1,067 mm) Cape gauge track. This was a remarkable feat, considering that twenty-seven years later the Gautrain, the dedicated high speed commuter train which was introduced two years later than planned in 2011, linked Pretoria and Johannesburg with a travelling time of 40 minutes, reaching speeds of 160 kilometres per hour (99 miles per hour) on dedicated 4 ft 8 1/2 in (1,435 mm) broad gauge track.

== Illustration ==
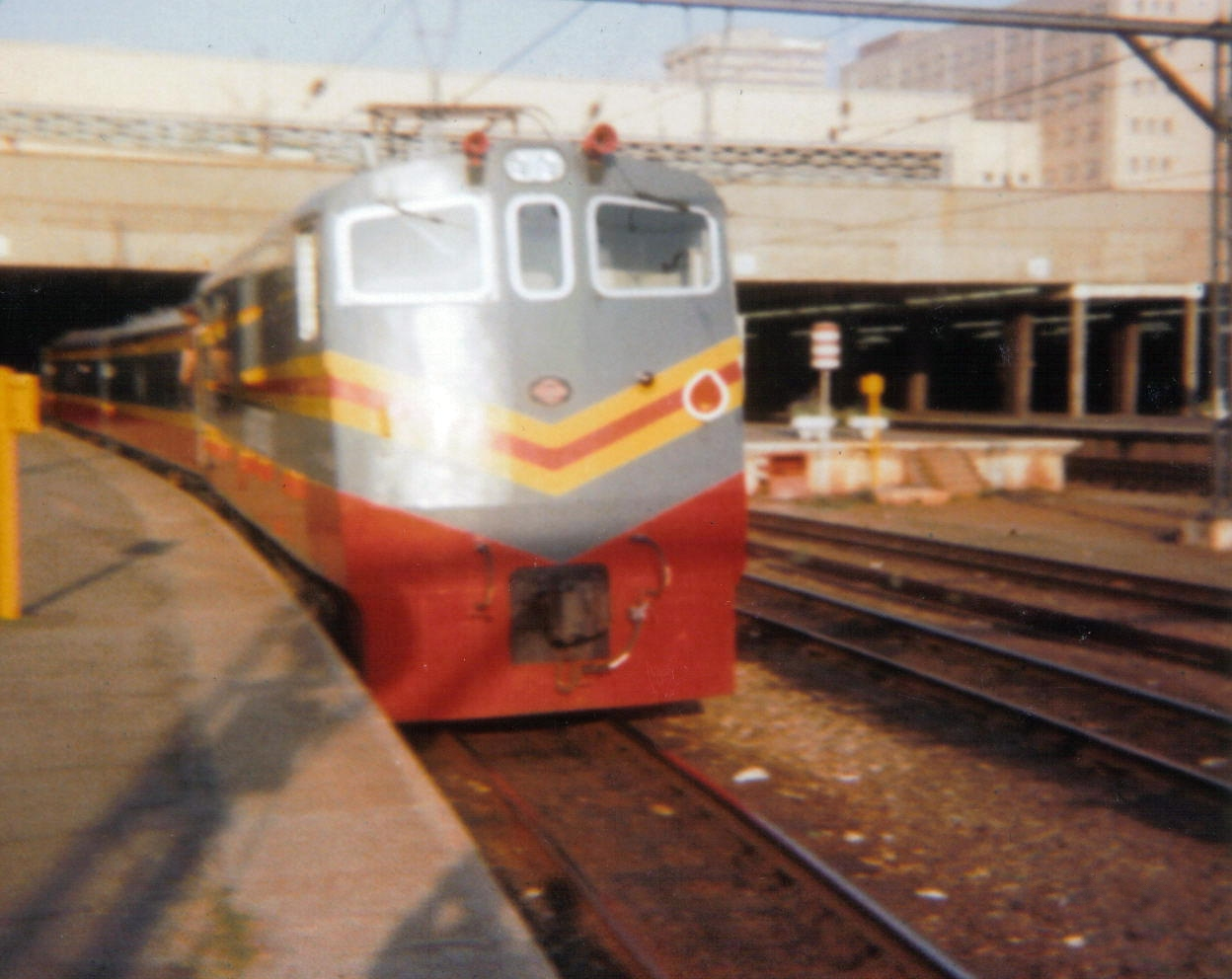
The MetroBlitz at Johannesburg station, September 1984

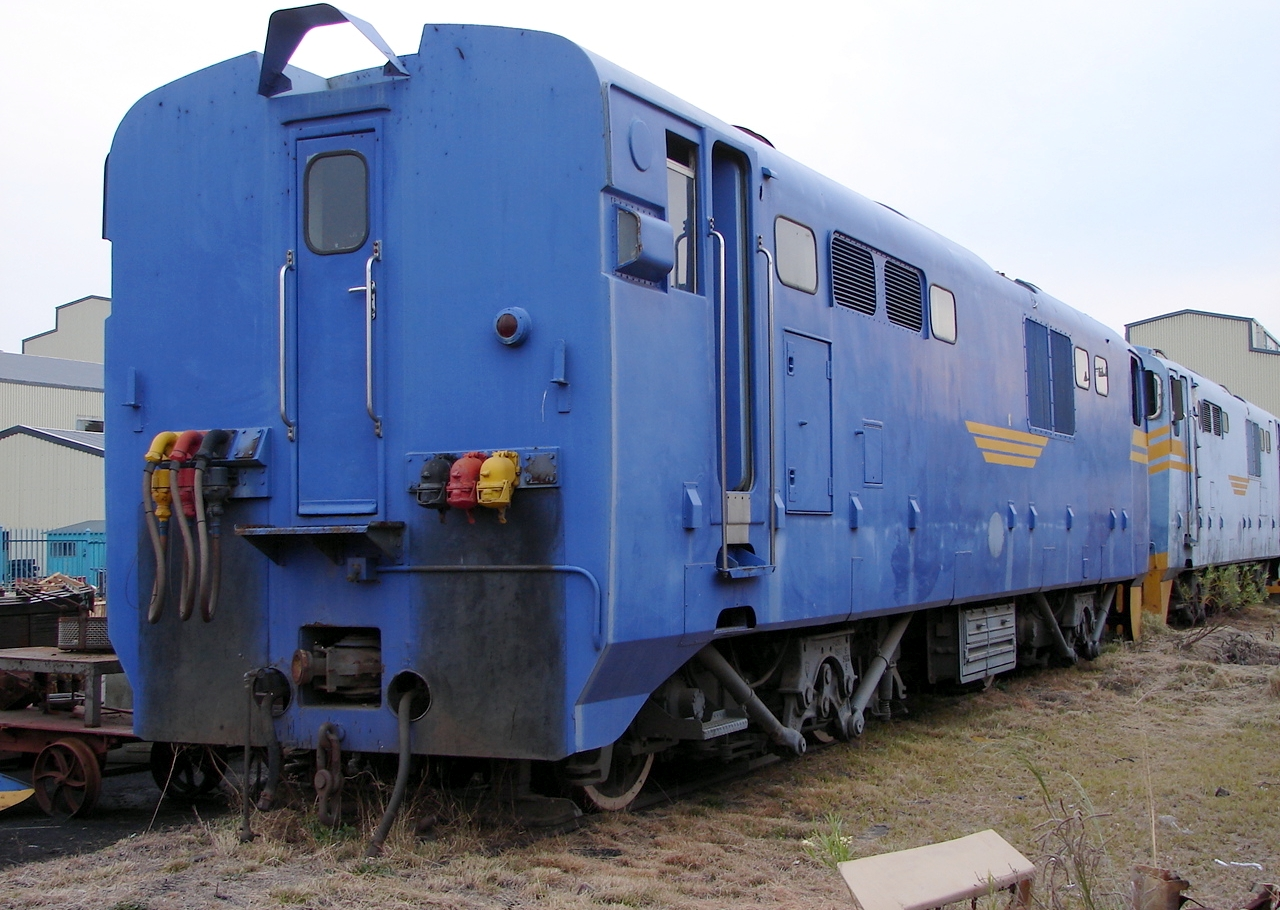
No. 12-002 in SAR Blue Train livery at Koedoespoort, 2 October 2009

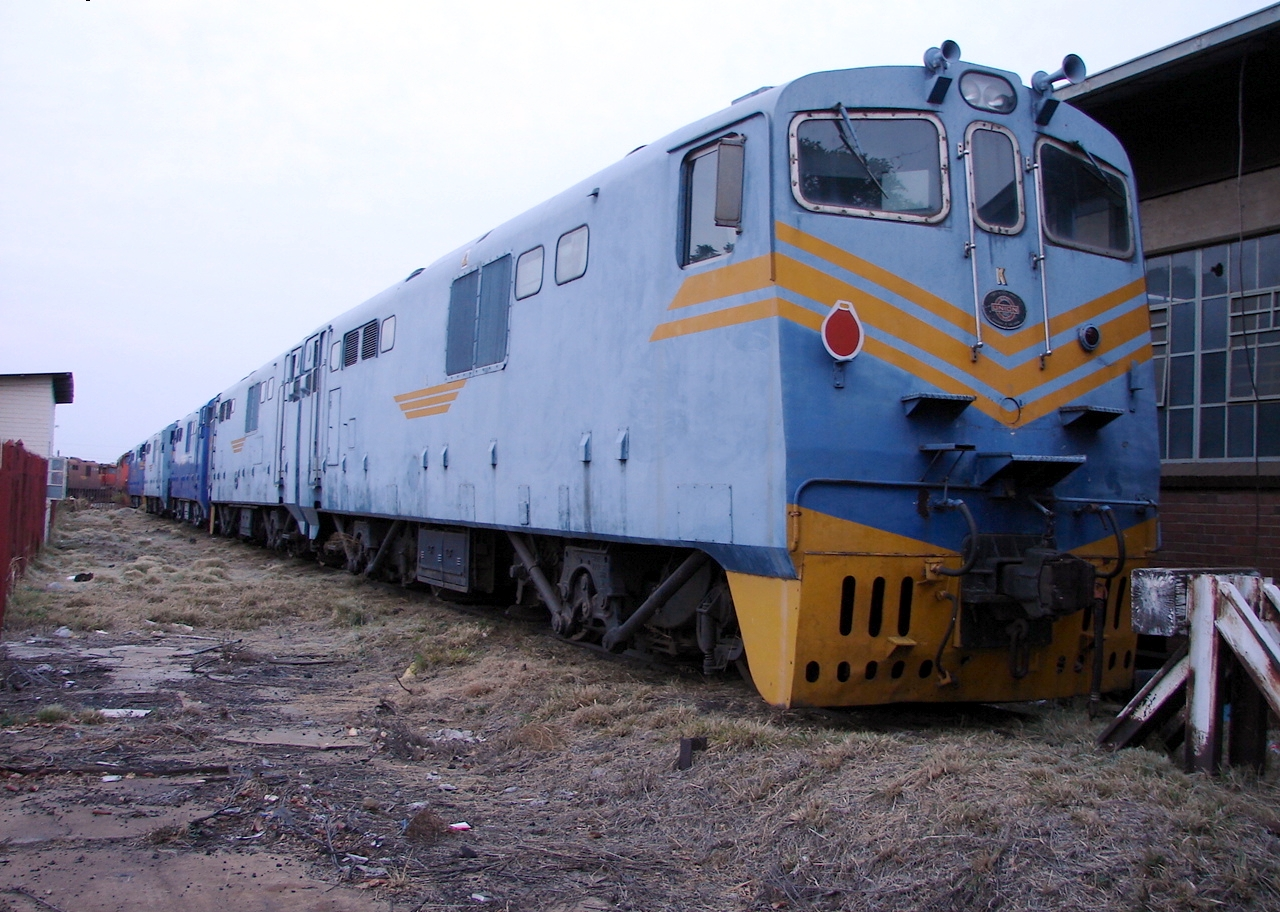
All five Class 12E locomotives, no. 12-001 front, Koedoespoort, 2 October 2009
