= MetroBlitz =

Defunct South African high-speed commuter train service

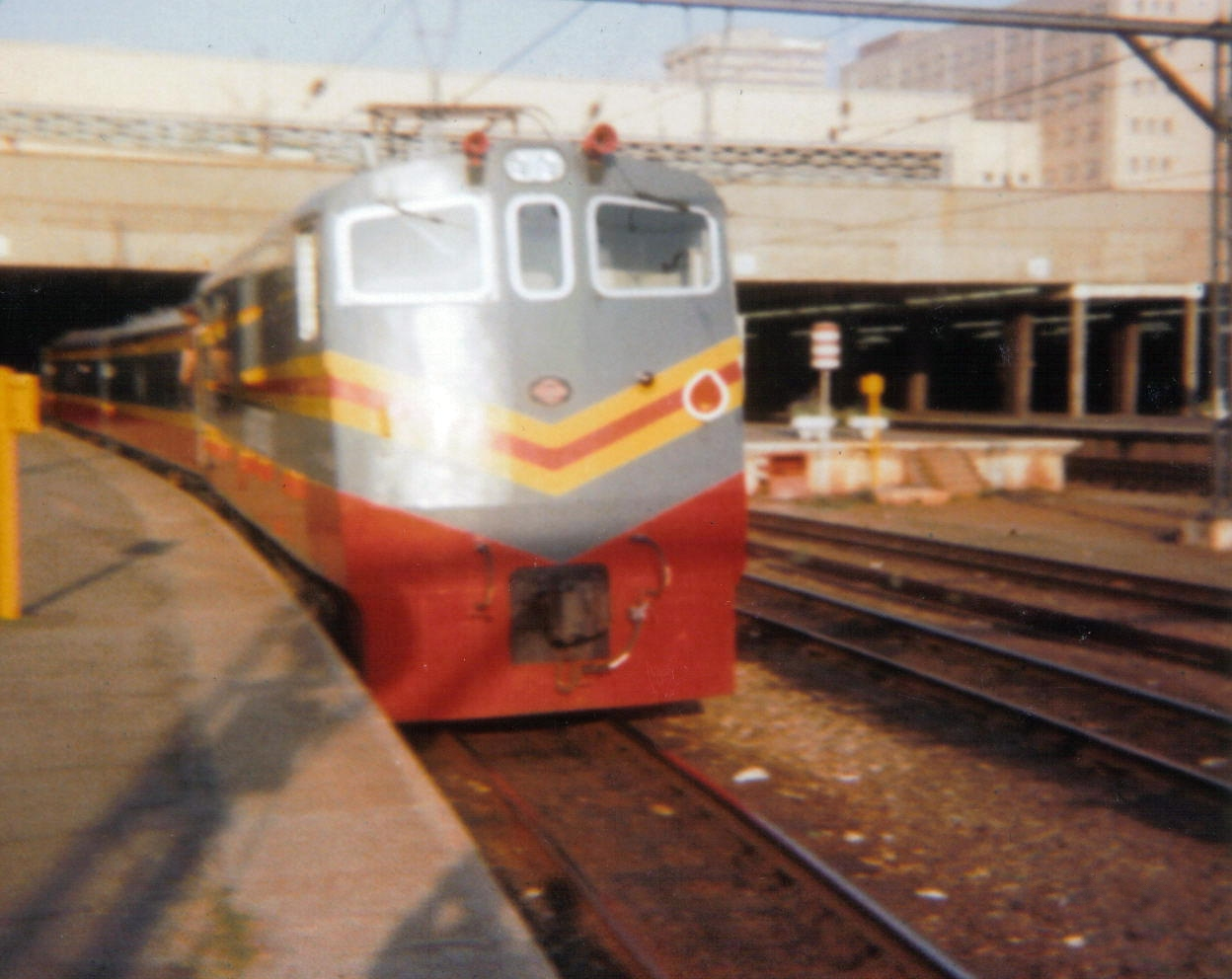
- The MetroBlitz at Johannesburg station in September 1984

MetroBlitz was an experimental high speed commuter train service between Pretoria station and Johannesburg Park Station via Germiston, operated by the South African Transport Services (SATS). It started service on 16 January 1984.

== History ==
=== High-speed test locomotive ===
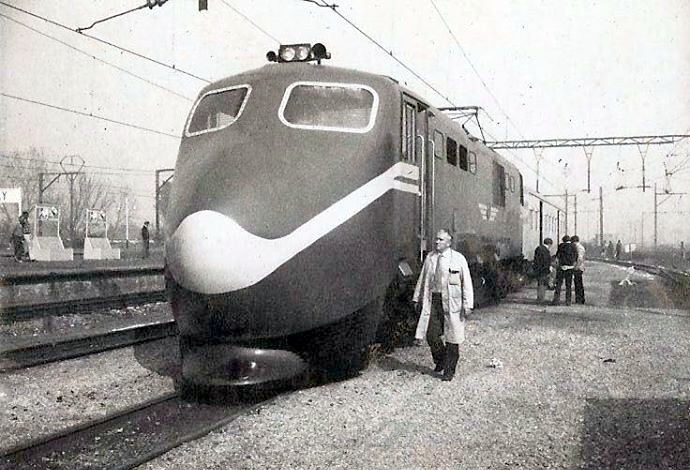
No. E1525 with nose cone for high speed testing

During the 1970s, Dr. Herbert Scheffel of the SAR experimented with self-steering bogies which not only reduced flange wear on goods wagons, but also opened up the possibility of running at high speed in passenger service on Cape gauge.

In 1978, one of the Series 4 units, no. E1525, was modified for experiments in high speed traction by re-gearing the traction motors, installing SAR-designed Scheffel bogies and fitting a streamlined nose cone on the no. 1 end. In this configuration, no. E1525 reached a speed of 245 kilometres per hour (152 miles per hour) hauling a specially adapted suburban coach on a stretch of track between Westonaria and Midway on 31 October 1978, a still unbeaten narrow gauge world speed record on 3 feet 6 inches (1,067 millimetres) Cape gauge.

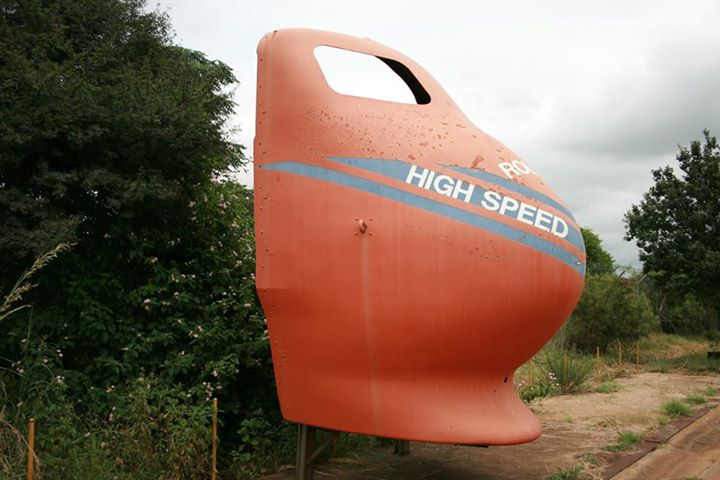
Nose cone used on no. E1525 during high speed testing

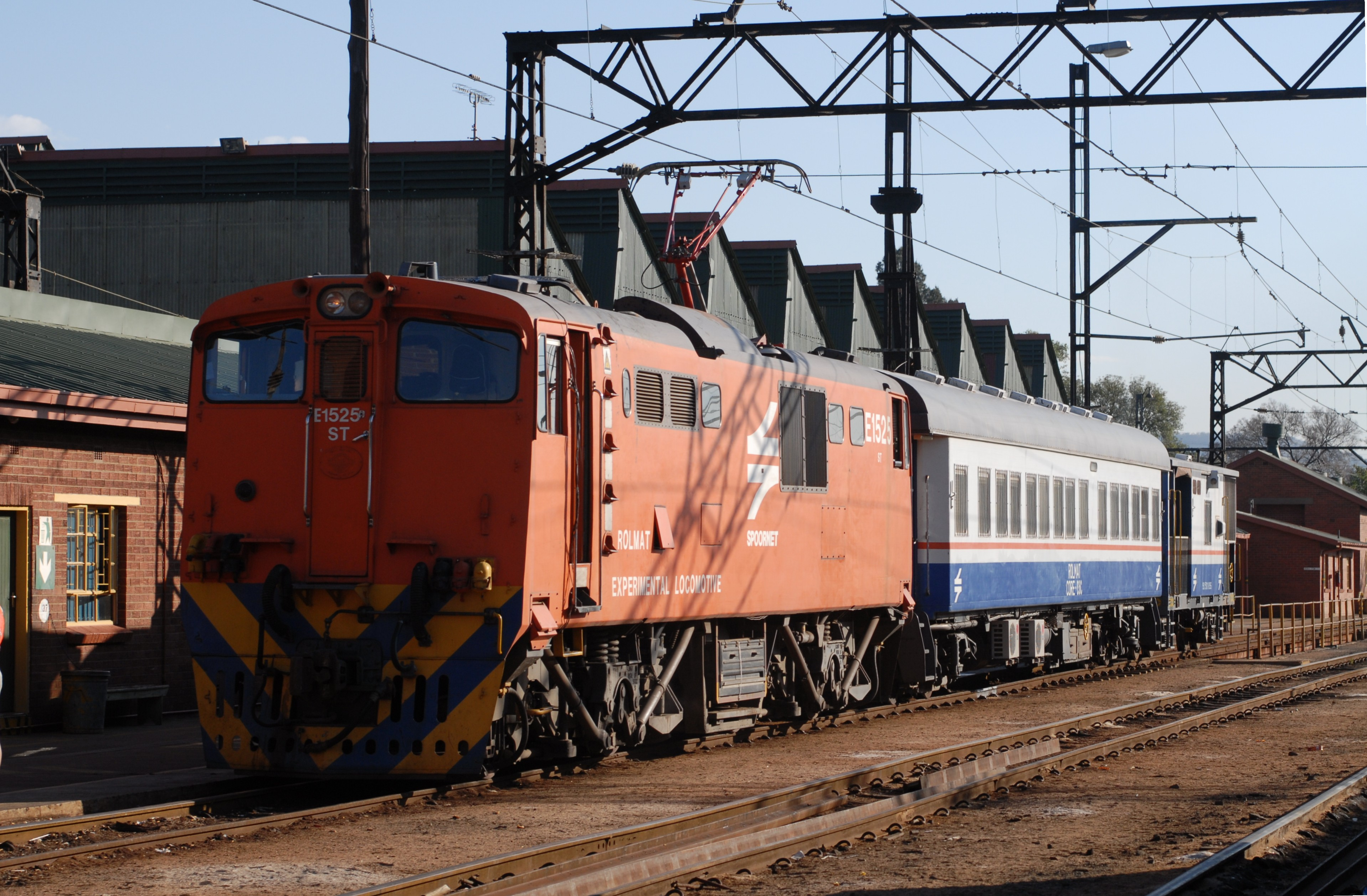
World speed record holder no. E1525

During November 1980, the same locomotive was used to test the British Rail-Brecknell Willis single-arm high-speed pantograph, then still under development, as part of the SAR's research towards introducing a new high-speed MetroBlitz service between Pretoria and Johannesburg. A number of European pantographs were being evaluated for use on the Class 6E1, with the trains running at 90 miles per hour (145 kilometres per hour) under catenary which usually saw nothing above 50 miles per hour (80 kilometres per hour). Testing took place over a 10-kilometre-long (6.2-mile) stretch of straight track between Rosslyn and De Wildt on the line between Pretoria and Brits. During the trials, speeds of up to 125 miles per hour (201 kilometres per hour) were achieved with the pantograph.

In the 2000s, similar single-arm type pantographs were adopted by Spoornet. These pantographs gradually replaced the older box-frame type pantographs on all electric locomotive types as and when replacement became necessary. Along with Class Experimental AC no. E1600, no. E1525 is still dedicated to testing projects since its different gear ratio and traction effort curves make it unsuitable for use in multi-unit working with other Class 6E1 locomotives in the fleet.

High speed locomotive and test coach	Current location		Disposal
1525	Koedoespoort	Museum	Transnet Heritage Foundation
11796			

=== MetroBlitz locomotives (12E) ===
Manufacturer The 3 kV DC Class 12E electric passenger locomotive was designed and built for the South African Railways (SAR) by Union Carriage & Wagon (UCW) in Nigel, Transvaal, with electrical equipment supplied by General Electric Company (GEC). It was a modified single-cab version of the Class 6E1, Series 10 locomotive and was specially designed and built for use with the MetroBlitz, a high-speed passenger commuter train which ran daily between Pretoria and Johannesburg with effect from 16 January 1984.

Five locomotives were delivered by UCW in 1983, numbered in the range from 12-001 to 12-005. Like the Class 6E1, Series 6 to 10, the Class 12E units were equipped with AEI-283AY traction motors. UCW did not allocate builder's numbers to the locomotives it built for the SAR, but used the SAR unit numbers for their record keeping.

Characteristics Based on the dual cab Class 6E1 locomotive, the Class 12E was a single-cab locomotive with a conductor's cabin at the rear end. They were used with specially designed suburban passenger coaches which rode on air-sprung disk-braked high speed Scheffel bogies. The MetroBlitz operated with two locomotives per train, one unit at each end, which made dual cabs unnecessary.

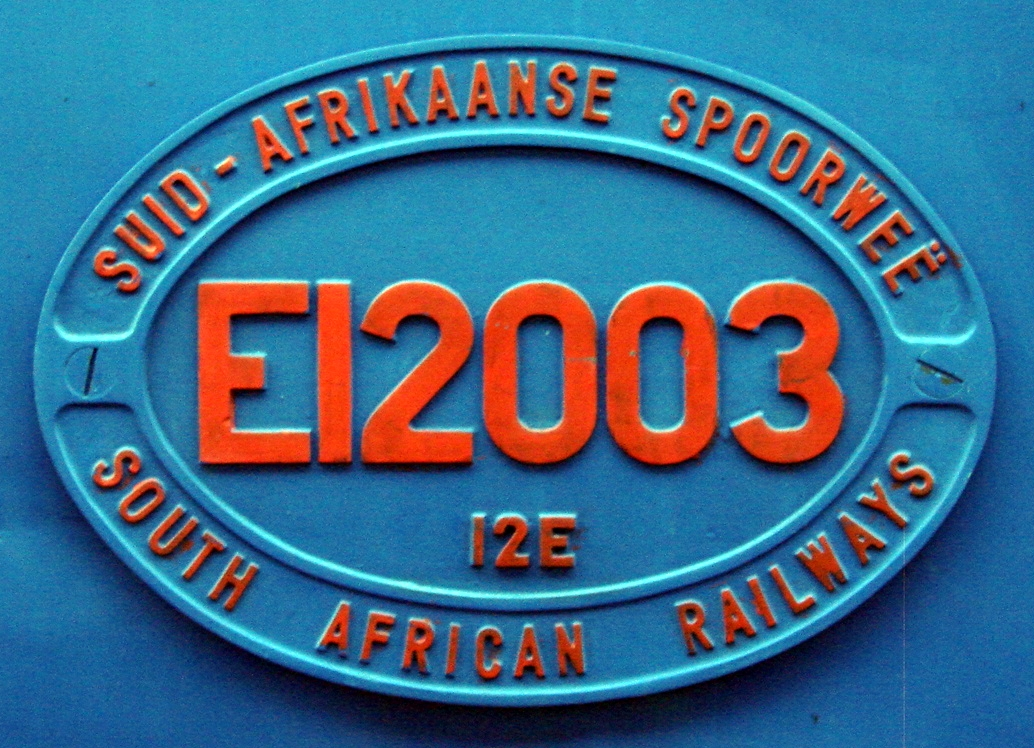

Like the Class 6E1, the Class 12E was built with sophisticated traction linkages on their bogies. Together with the locomotive's electronic wheel-slip detection system these traction struts, mounted between the linkages on the bogies and the locomotive body and colloquially referred to as grasshopper legs, ensured the maximum transfer of power to the rails without causing wheel-slip by reducing the adhesion of the leading bogie and increasing that of the trailing bogie by as much as 15% upon starting. This feature was controlled by electronic wheel-slip detection devices and an electric weight transfer relay which reduced the anchor current to the leading bogie by as much as 50A in notches 2 to 16.

The Class 12E had the same power output as a Class 6E1, but with a higher gear ratio of 23:66 compared to the 18:67 of the Class 6E1. This enabled it to run at a safe maximum speed of 150 kilometres per hour (93 miles per hour). Since it was designed for suburban service, sanding gear was deemed unnecessary and was not installed on the Class 12E, as evident from the absence of the sandbox lids seen along the bottom body sides of most Class 6E1 locomotives. This turned out to be a disadvantage when they were eventually allocated to mainline service to haul the Blue Train.

Locomotive	Status	Location	Disposal
12-001	Sold: TFR Auction	*	Scrapped
12-002	Sold: TFR Auction	*	Scrapped
12-003	Sold: TFR Auction	*	Scrapped
12-004	Sold: TFR Auction	*	Scrapped
12-005	Preserved	Currently stored at Koedoespoort	Transnet Heritage Foundation

== Demise ==
Poor cost recovery and disruption to other slower train services are cited as the reasons for the demise of the MetroBlitz.

After the MetroBlitz service came to an end in 1985, the five Class 12E locomotives were repainted blue with yellow whiskers and replaced Class 6E1 numbers E1341 to E1345 as Blue Train locomotives between Pretoria and Kimberley. Probably at the same time, their original unpierced cowcatchers were replaced with ones with a pattern of holes, similar to those used on the Class 5E and Class 6E families but slanted back towards the front bogies.

They worked the Blue Train between Pretoria and Kimberley until about 2005, when that function was taken over by the dual voltage Classes 14E and 14E1. These were able to work the Blue Train over the full distance between Johannesburg and Cape Town across the 25 kV section between Kimberley and De Aar as well as on other electrified routes.

== MetroBlitz rolling stock ==
Number	Build from other coaches	Location	Disposal
50000			
50001		X	Scrapped
50002			
50003		X	Scrapped
50004			
50005		X	Scrapped
50006		X	Scrapped
50007	NR 40066	X	Scrapped
50008			
50009			
50010			
50011			
50012		X	Scrapped
50013		X	Scrapped
50014			
50015			
50016	NR 40065	X	Scrapped

== See also ==
- South African Class 12E
- Gautrain
