= South African Class 6E1, Series 4 =

Class of 100 South African electric locomotives

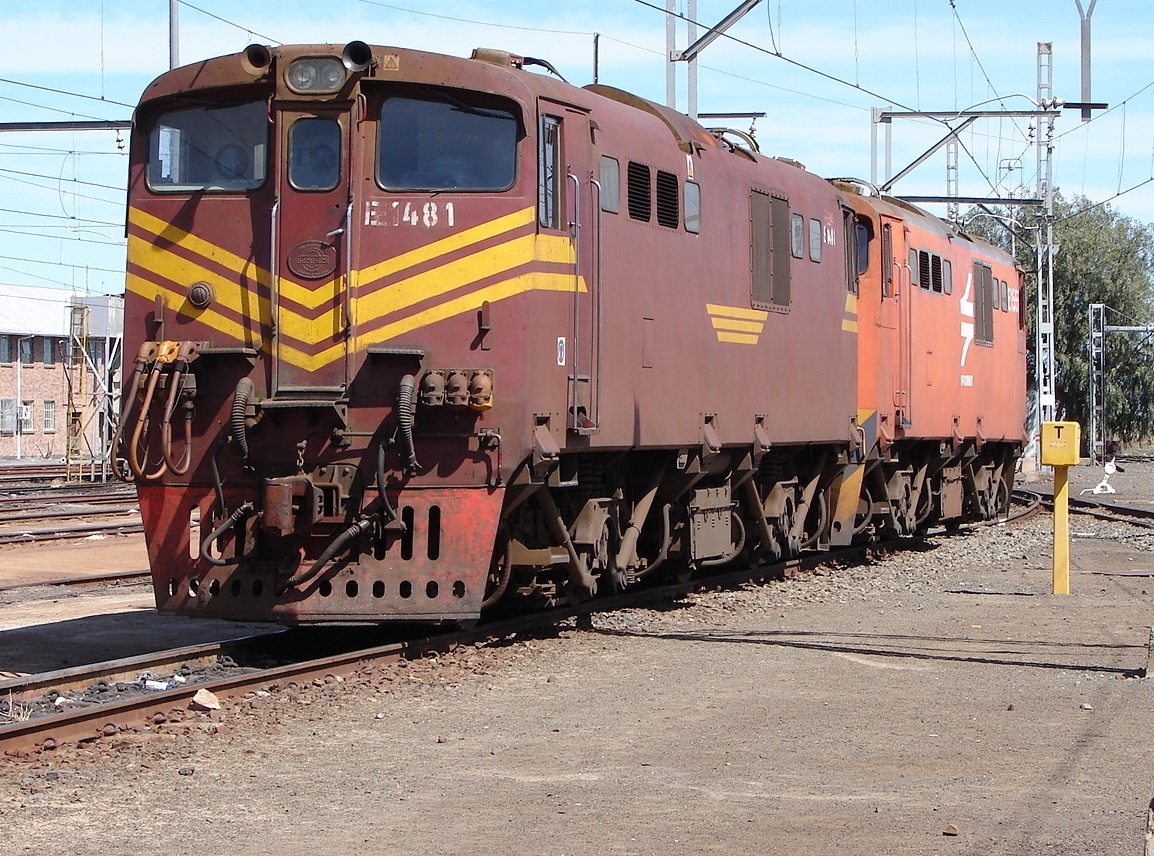
- E1481 at Beaufort West, 16 September 2009
Type and origin
- Power type: Electric
- Designer: Union Carriage & Wagon
- Builder: Union Carriage & Wagon
- Model: UCW 6E1
- Build date: 1973-1974
- Total produced: 100
- Rebuilder: Transnet Rail Engineering
- Rebuild date: 2010-2015
- Number rebuilt: 70 to Class 18E, Series 2
Specifications
- Configuration
  - AAR: B-B
  - UIC: Bo'Bo'
  - Commonwealth: Bo-Bo
- Gauge: 3 ft 6 in (1,067 mm) Cape gauge
- Wheel diameter: 1,220 mm (48.03 in)
- Wheelbase: 11,279 mm (37 ft 0 in)
  - Bogie: 3,430 mm (11 ft 3 in)
- Pivot centres: 7,849 mm (25 ft 9 in)
- Panto shoes: 6,972 mm (22 ft 10 1/2 in)
- Length
  - Over couplers: 15,494 mm (50 ft 10 in)
  - Over body: 14,631 mm (48 ft 0 in)
- Width: 2,896 mm (9 ft 6 in)
- Height
  - Pantograph: 4,089 mm (13 ft 5 in)
  - Body height: 3,937 mm (12 ft 11 in)
- Axle load: 22,226 kg (49,000 lb)
- Adhesive weight: 88,904 kg (196,000 lb)
- Loco weight: 88,904 kg (196,000 lb)
- Electric system/s: 3 kV DC catenary
- Current pickup(s): Pantographs
- Traction motors: Four AEI-283AZ
  - Rating 1 hour: 623 kW (835 hp)
  - Continuous: 563 kW (755 hp)
- Gear ratio: 18:67
- Loco brake: Air & Regenerative
- Train brakes: Air & Vacuum
- Couplers: AAR knuckle
Performance figures
- Maximum speed: 113 km/h (70 mph)
- Power output
  - 1 hour: 2,492 kW (3,342 hp)
  - Continuous: 2,252 kW (3,020 hp)
- Tractive effort
  - Starting: 311 kN (70,000 lbf)
  - 1 hour: 221 kN (50,000 lbf)
  - Continuous: 193 kN (43,000 lbf) @ 40 km/h (25 mph)
Career
- Operators: South African Railways; Spoornet; Transnet Freight Rail; PRASA
- Class: Class 6E1
- Number in class: 100
- Numbers: E1446-E1545
- Delivered: 1973-1974
- First run: 1973

The South African Railways Class 6E1, Series 4 of 1973 was an electric locomotive.

In 1973 and 1974, the South African Railways placed one hundred Class 6E1, Series 4 electric locomotives with a Bo-Bo wheel arrangement in mainline service. One of them holds the narrow gauge world rail speed record on Cape gauge.

== Manufacturer ==
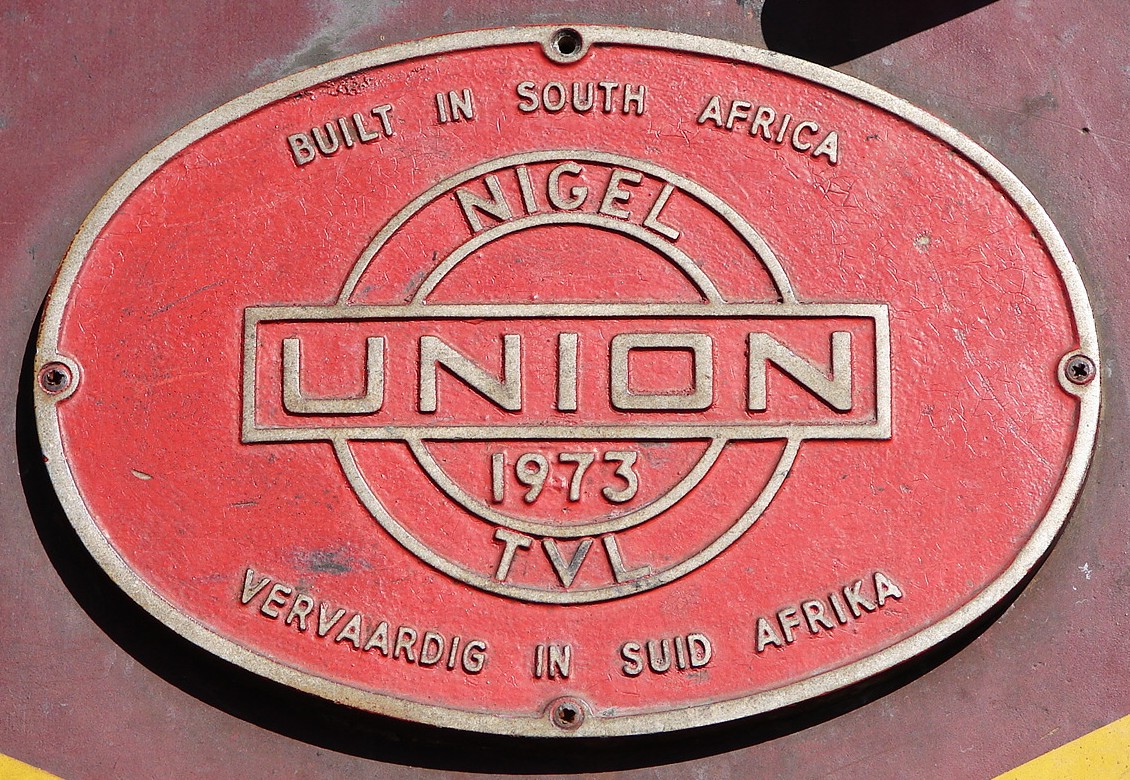
Builder's plate

The 3 kV DC Class 6E1, Series 4 electric locomotive was designed and built for the South African Railways (SAR) by Union Carriage & Wagon (UCW) in Nigel, Transvaal, with the electrical equipment being supplied by the General Electric Company (GEC).

One hundred units were delivered in 1973 and 1974, numbered in the range from E1446 to E1545. Like Series 1 to 3, Series 4 units were equipped with four AEI-283AZ axle-hung traction motors. UCW did not allocate builder's or works numbers to the locomotives it built for the SAR and used the SAR unit numbers for their record keeping.

== Characteristics ==
=== Orientation ===
These dual cab locomotives had a roof access ladder on one side only, just to the right of the cab access door. The roof access ladder end was marked as the no. 2 end. A corridor along the centre of the unit connected the cabs which were identical apart from the fact that the handbrake was located in cab 2. A pantograph hook stick was stowed in a tube mounted below the bottom edge of the locomotive body on the roof access ladder side. The units had one square and two rectangular access panels along the lower half of the body on the roof access ladder side, and only one square access panel on the opposite side.

=== Series identifying features ===
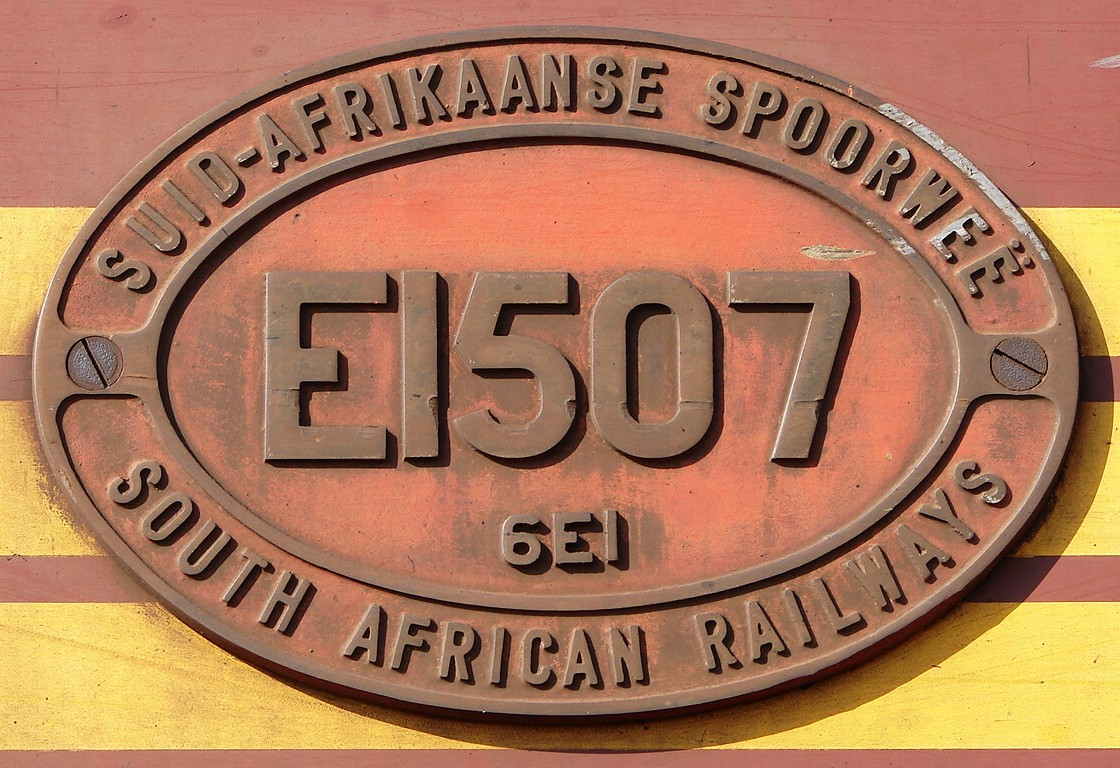

The Class 6E1 was produced in eleven series over a period of nearly sixteen years. While some Class 6E1 series were visually indistinguishable from their predecessors or successors, some externally visible changes did occur over the years.

The Series 3 to Series 5 locomotives are visually indistinguishable from each other. On the early Series 3 units in the number range from E1296 to E1345, an externally visible difference was a narrower stirrup below their side doors.

== Service ==
The Class 6E1 family saw service all over both 3 kV DC mainline and branch line networks, the smaller Cape Western mainline between Cape Town and Beaufort West and the larger network which covers portions of the Northern Cape, the Free State, Natal, Gauteng, North West and Mpumalanga.

== World rail speed record ==
During the 1970s, Dr. Herbert Scheffel of the SAR experimented with self-steering bogies which not only reduced flange wear on goods wagons, but also opened up the possibility of running at high speed in passenger service on Cape gauge.

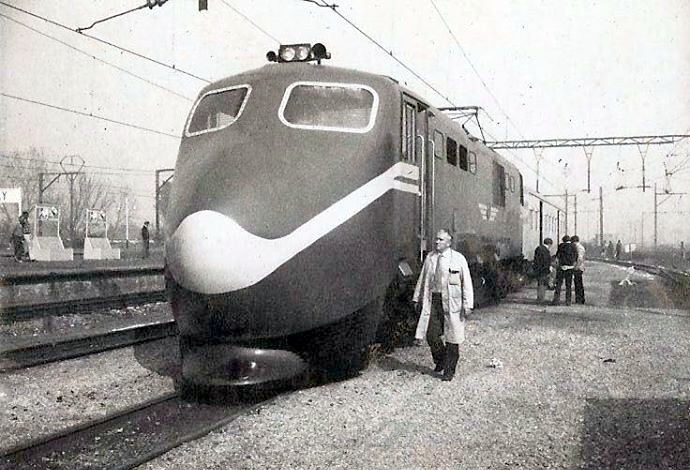
No. E1525 with nose cone for high speed testing

In 1978, one of the Series 4 units, no. E1525, was modified for experiments in high speed traction by re-gearing the traction motors, installing SAR-designed Scheffel bogies and fitting a streamlined nose cone on the no. 1 end. In this configuration, no. E1525 reached a speed of 245 kilometres per hour (152 miles per hour) hauling a specially-adapted suburban coach on a stretch of track between Westonaria and Midway on 31 October 1978, a still unbeaten narrow gauge world speed record on 3 feet 6 inches (1,067 millimetres) Cape gauge.

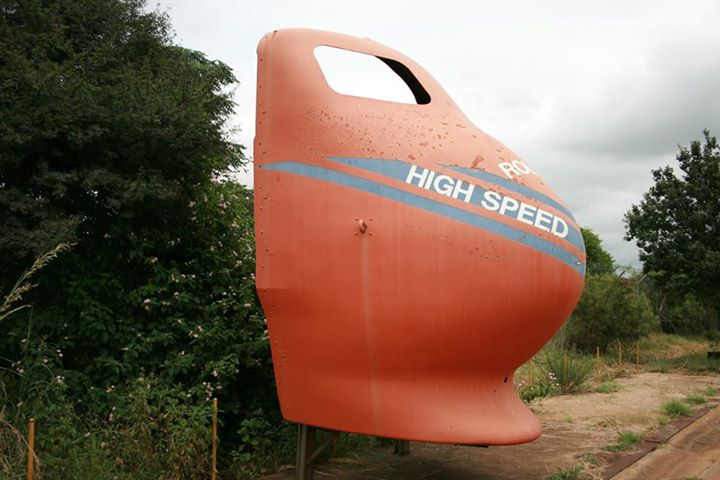
Nose cone used on no. E1525 during high speed testing

During November 1980, the same locomotive was used to test the British Rail-Brecknell Willis single-arm high-speed pantograph, then still under development, as part of the SAR's research towards introducing a new high-speed MetroBlitz service between Pretoria and Johannesburg. A number of European pantographs were being evaluated for use on the Class 6E1, with the trains running at 90 miles per hour (145 kilometres per hour) under catenary which usually saw nothing above 50 miles per hour (80 kilometres per hour). Testing took place over a 10-kilometre-long (6.2-mile) stretch of straight track between Rosslyn and De Wildt on the line between Pretoria and Brits. During the trials, speeds of up to 125 miles per hour (201 kilometres per hour) were achieved with the pantograph.

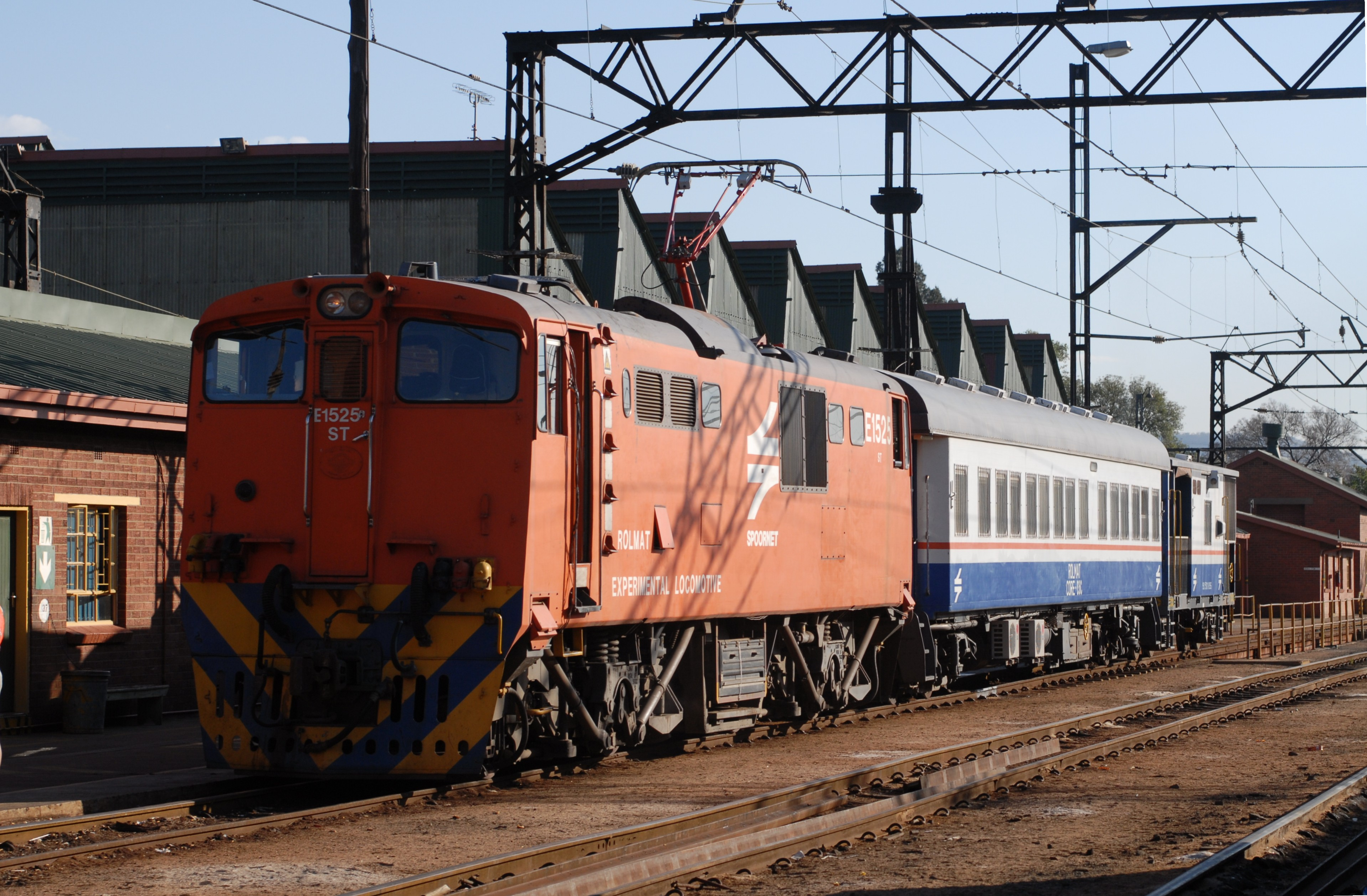
World speed record holder no. E1525

In the 2000s, similar single-arm type pantographs were adopted by Spoornet. These pantographs gradually replaced the older box-frame type pantographs on all electric locomotive types as and when replacement became necessary. Along with Class Experimental AC no. E1600, no. E1525 is still dedicated to testing projects since its different gear ratio and traction effort curves make it unsuitable for use in multi-unit working with other Class 6E1 locomotives in the fleet.

The MetroBlitz service commenced in January 1984. This testing project eventually bore more fruit in 2011 upon the opening of the 1,435 millimetres (4 feet 8½ inches) standard gauge Gautrain which connects Pretoria, Johannesburg and the O.R. Tambo International Airport (the former Jan Smuts Airport) in Kempton Park.

No. E1525 is set to be preserved for the national collection by the SA Heritage Agency and Transnet Heritage Foundation.(stored Koedoespoort 03/2020)

== Reclassification and rebuilding ==
=== Reclassification to Class 16E ===
During 1990 and 1991, Spoornet semi-permanently coupled several pairs of otherwise largely unmodified Class 6E1 units, reclassified them to Class 16E and allocated a single locomotive number to each pair, with the individual units in the pairs inscribed "A" or "B". The aim was to accomplish savings on cab maintenance by coupling the units at their no. 1 ends, abandoning the no. 1 end cabs in terms of maintenance and using only the no. 2 end cabs.

One known Series 4 unit, no. E1457, was part of such a Class 16E pair and became Class 16E no. 16-305B.

=== Rebuilding to Class 18E ===
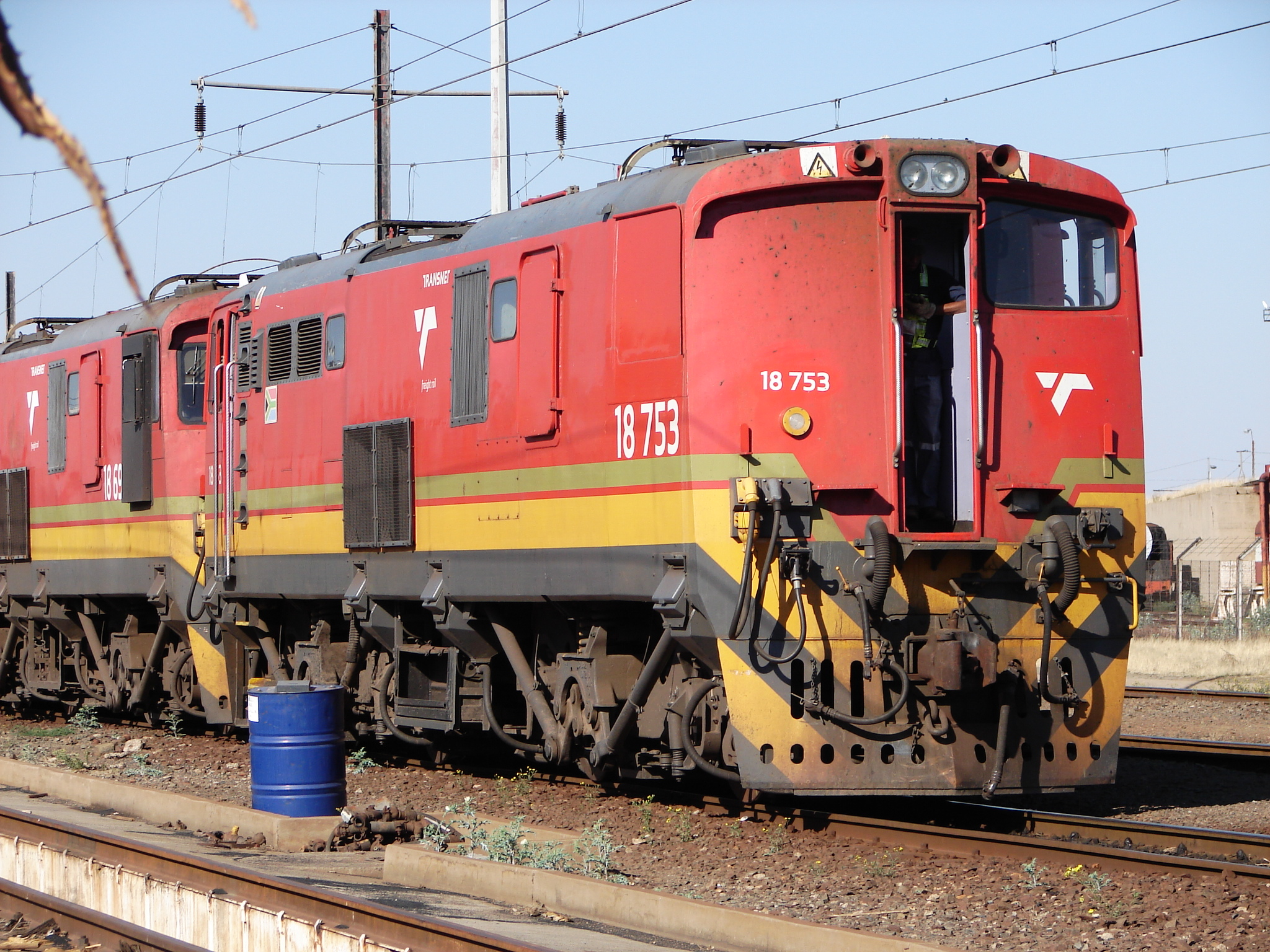
Cab 1 of Class 18E no. 18-753, ex Class 6E1 no. E1537, Beaconsfield, 17 September 2015

Beginning in 2000, Spoornet began a project to rebuild Series 2 to 11 Class 6E1 units to Class 18E, Series 1 and Series 2 at the Transnet Rail Engineering workshops at Koedoespoort. In the process the cab at the no. 1 end was stripped of all controls and the driver's front and side windows were blanked off to have a toilet installed, thereby forfeiting the unit's bi-directional ability.

Since the driving cab's noise level had to be below 85 decibels, cab 2 was selected as the Class 18E driving cab, primarily based on its lower noise level compared to cab 1 which was closer and more exposed to the compressor's noise and vibration. Another factor was the closer proximity of cab 2 to the low voltage switch panel. The fact that the handbrake was located in cab 2 was not a deciding factor, but was considered an additional benefit.

The known Class 6E1, Series 4 units which were used in this project were all rebuilt to Class 18E, Series 2 locomotives. Their numbers and renumbering details are listed in the table.

Class 6E1, Series 4 units rebuilt to Class 18E as on 19 January 2015
Count	6E1 no.	Year built	18E no.	18E series	Year rebuilt	Notes
1	E1446	1973	18-785	2	2014	circa 2014
2	E1447	1973	18-708	2	2012	
3	E1451	1973-74	18-855	2	2015	
4	E1452	1973	18-421	2	2012	PRASA
5	E1453	1973	18-742	2	2013	
6	E1458	1973	18-657	2	2011	
7	E1459	1973	18-429	2	2013	PRASA
8	E1460	1973	18-425	2	2012	PRASA
9	E1461	1973	18-829	2	2015	
10	E1463	1973	18-658	2	2011	
11	E1467	1973	18-433	2	2013	PRASA
12	E1469	1973-74	18-857	2	2015	
13	E1470	1973-74	18-671	2	2011	
14	E1471	1973-74	18-804	2	2014	circa 2014
15	E1473	1973-74	18-802	2	2014	circa 2014
16	E1476	1973-74	18-797	2	2014	circa 2014
17	E1477	1973-74	18-846	2	2015	
18	E1478	1973-74	18-848	2	2015	
19	E1479	1973-74	18-666	2	2011	
20	E1480	1973-74	18-660	2	2011	
21	E1481	1973-74	18-428	2	2012	PRASA
22	E1483	1973-74	18-856	2	2015	
23	E1484	1973-74	18-852	2	2015	
24	E1486	1973-74	18-854	2	2015	
25	E1487	1973-74	18-659	2	2011	
26	E1488	1973-74	18-765	2	2013	
27	E1490	1973-74	18-424	2	2012	PRASA
28	E1492	1973-74	18-719	2	2012	
29	E1493	1973-74	18-640	2	2011	
30	E1494	1974	18-665	2	2011	
31	E1495	1974	18-763	2	2013	
32	E1498	1974	18-787	2	2014	circa 2014
33	E1501	1974	18-696	2	2012	
34	E1502	1974	18-675	2	2011	
35	E1503	1974	18-669	2	2011	
36	E1504	1974	18-847	2	2015	
37	E1505	1974	18-840	2	2015	
38	E1506	1974	18-831	2	2015	
39	E1507	1974	18-838	2	2015	
40	E1508	1974	18-638	2	2010	
41	E1509	1974	18-841	2	2015	
42	E1510	1974	18-845	2	2015	
43	E1511	1974	18-784	2	2014	circa 2014
44	E1512	1974	18-688	2	2011	
45	E1513	1974	18-843	2	2015	
46	E1514	1974	18-836	2	2015	
47	E1516	1974	18-714	2	2012	
48	E1517	1974	18-774	2	2013	circa 2013
49	E1518	1974	18-738	2	2013	
50	E1519	1974	18-650	2	2010	
51	E1520	1974	18-853	2	2015	
52	E1521	1974	18-643	2	2010	
53	E1522	1974	18-839	2	2015	
54	E1524	1974	18-674	2	2011	
55	E1526	1974	18-740	2	2013	
56	E1527	1974	18-758	2	2013	
57	E1529	1974	18-833	2	2015	
58	E1530	1974	18-656	2	2011	
59	E1531	1974	18-718	2	2012	
60	E1532	1974	18-739	2	2013	
61	E1533	1974	18-767	2	2013	
62	E1534	1974	18-834	2	2015	
63	E1535	1974	18-636	2	2010	
64	E1536	1974	18-717	2	2012	
65	E1537	1974	18-753	2	2013	
66	E1538	1974	18-694	2	2012	
67	E1540	1974	18-746	2	2013	
68	E1542	1974	18-780	2	2013	circa 2013
69	E1544	1974	18-749	2	2013	
70	E1545	1974	18-781	2	2014	circa 2014

== Liveries ==
The whole series was delivered in the SAR Gulf Red livery with signal red cowcatchers, yellow whiskers and with the number plates on the sides mounted on three-stripe yellow wings. In the 1990s many of the Series 4 units began to be repainted in the Spoornet orange livery with a yellow and blue chevron pattern on the cowcatchers. Several later received the Spoornet maroon livery. In the late 1990s at least two were repainted in the Spoornet blue livery with solid numbers. After 2008 in the Passenger Rail Agency of South Africa (PRASA) era, at least one was repainted in the PRASA purple livery.

== Illustration ==
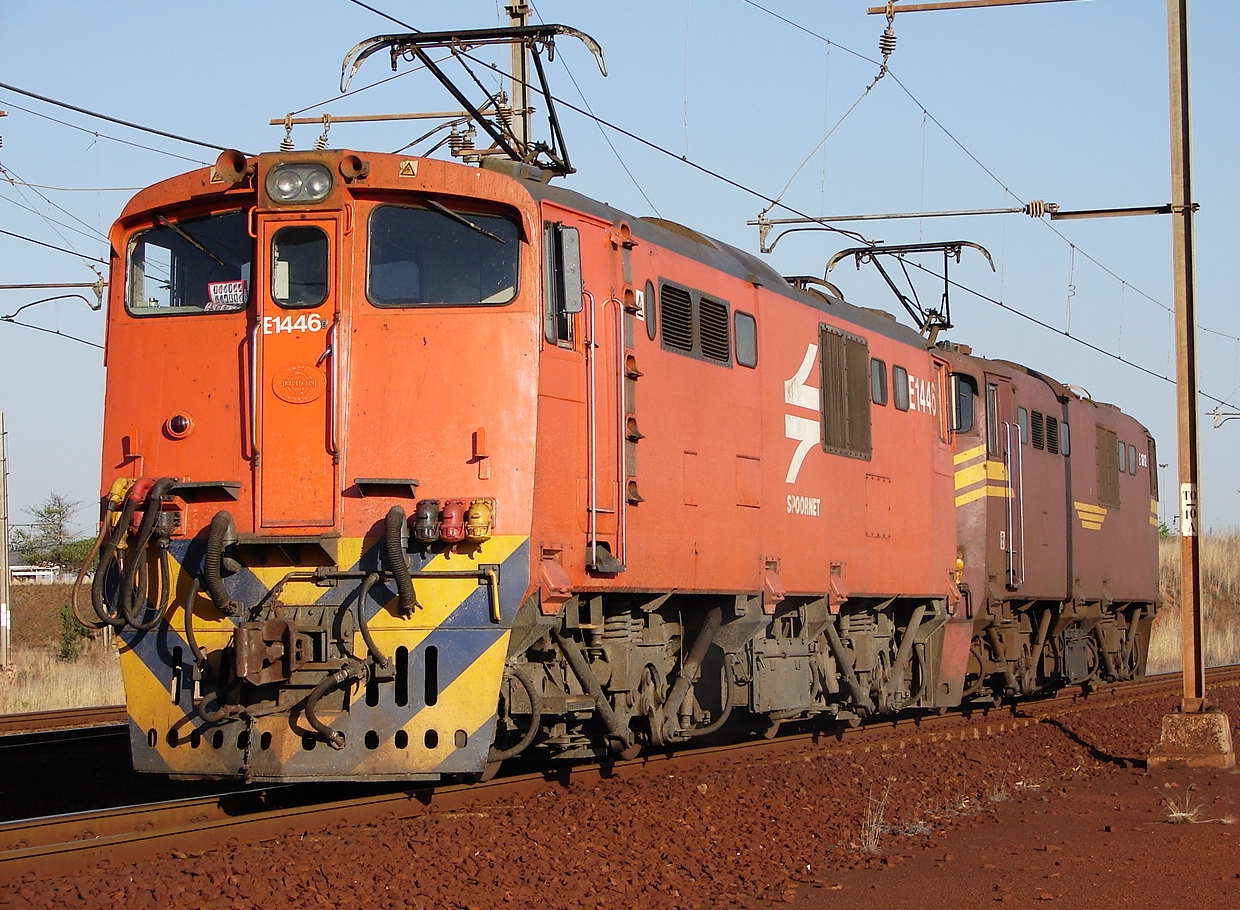
No. E1446 in Spoornet orange livery at Sentrarand Yard, Gauteng, 8 October 2009

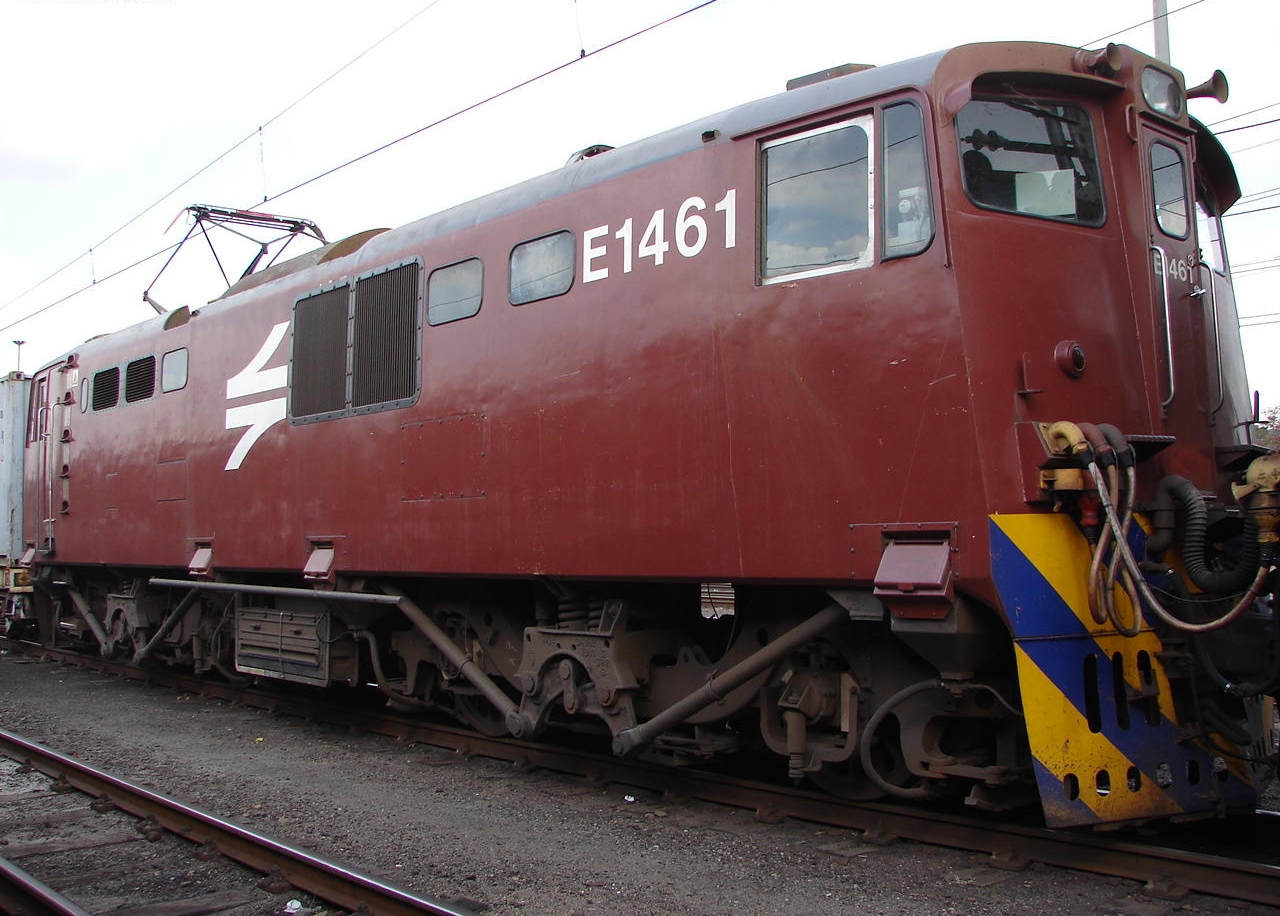
No. E1461 in Spoornet maroon livery at Capital Park, Pretoria, 9 May 2006

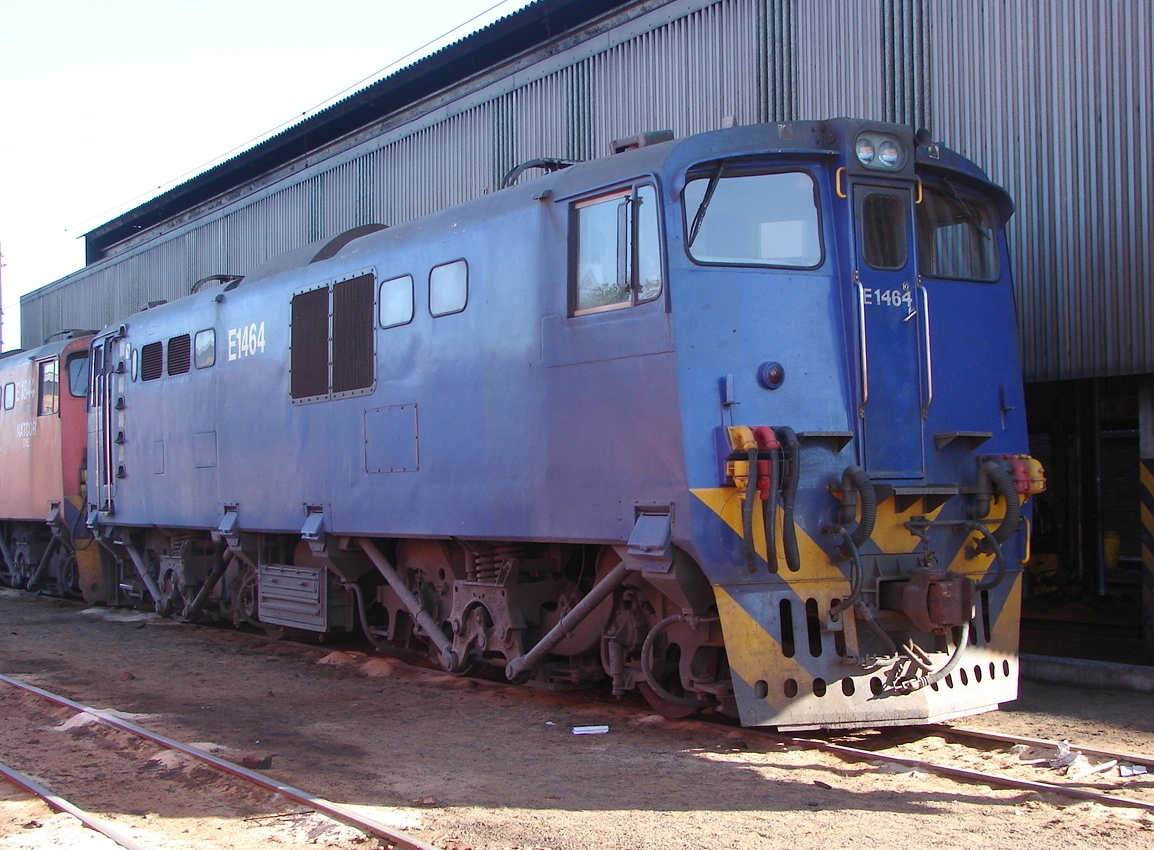
No. E1464 in Spoornet blue livery with solid numbers at Bellville Depot, 26 April 2009

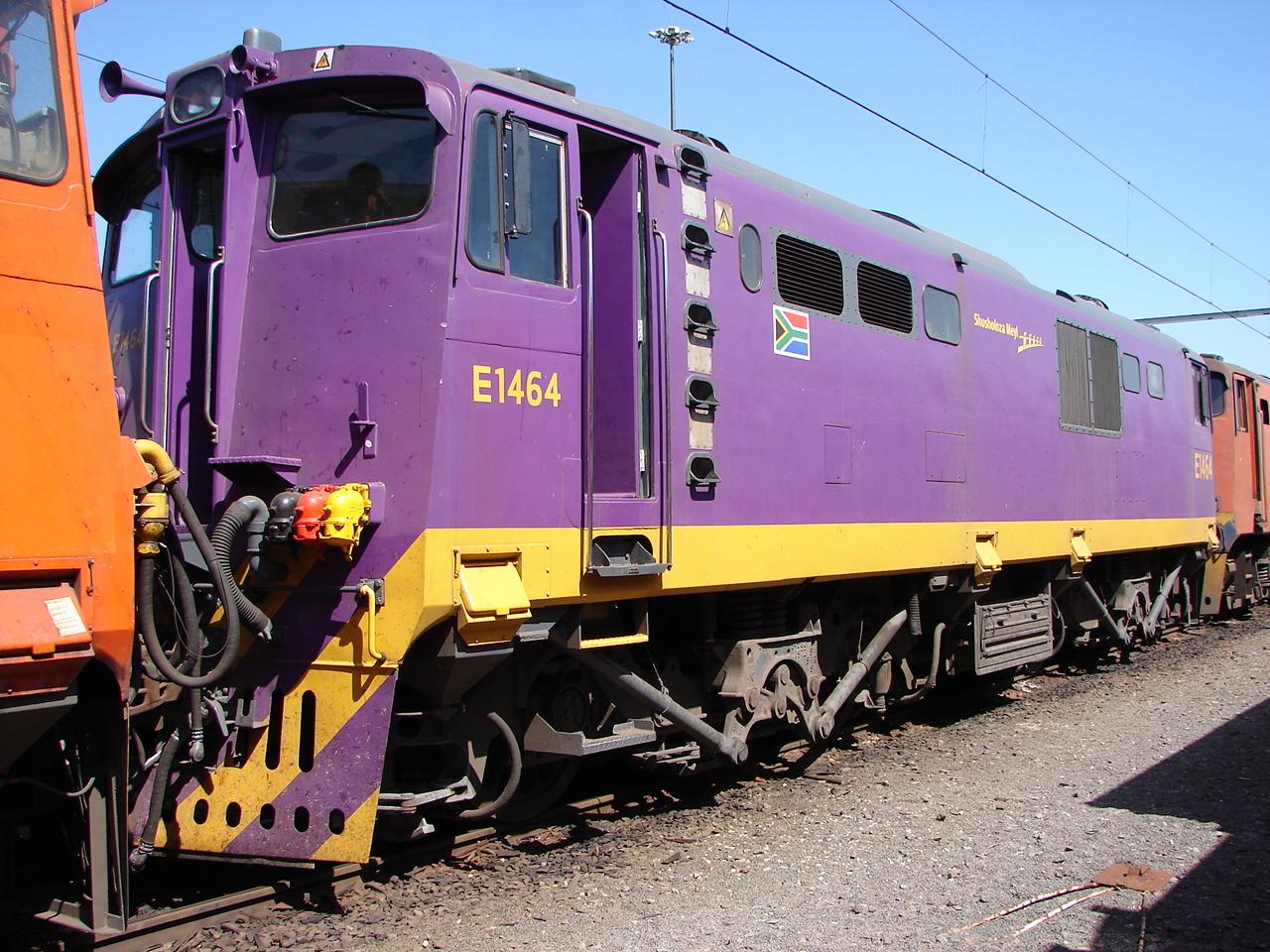
No. E1464 in the Passenger Rail Agency of South Africa's Shosholoza Meyl livery at Bellville Depot, 26 January 2010
