= South African Class 6E1, Series 3 =

Class of 150 South African electric locomotives

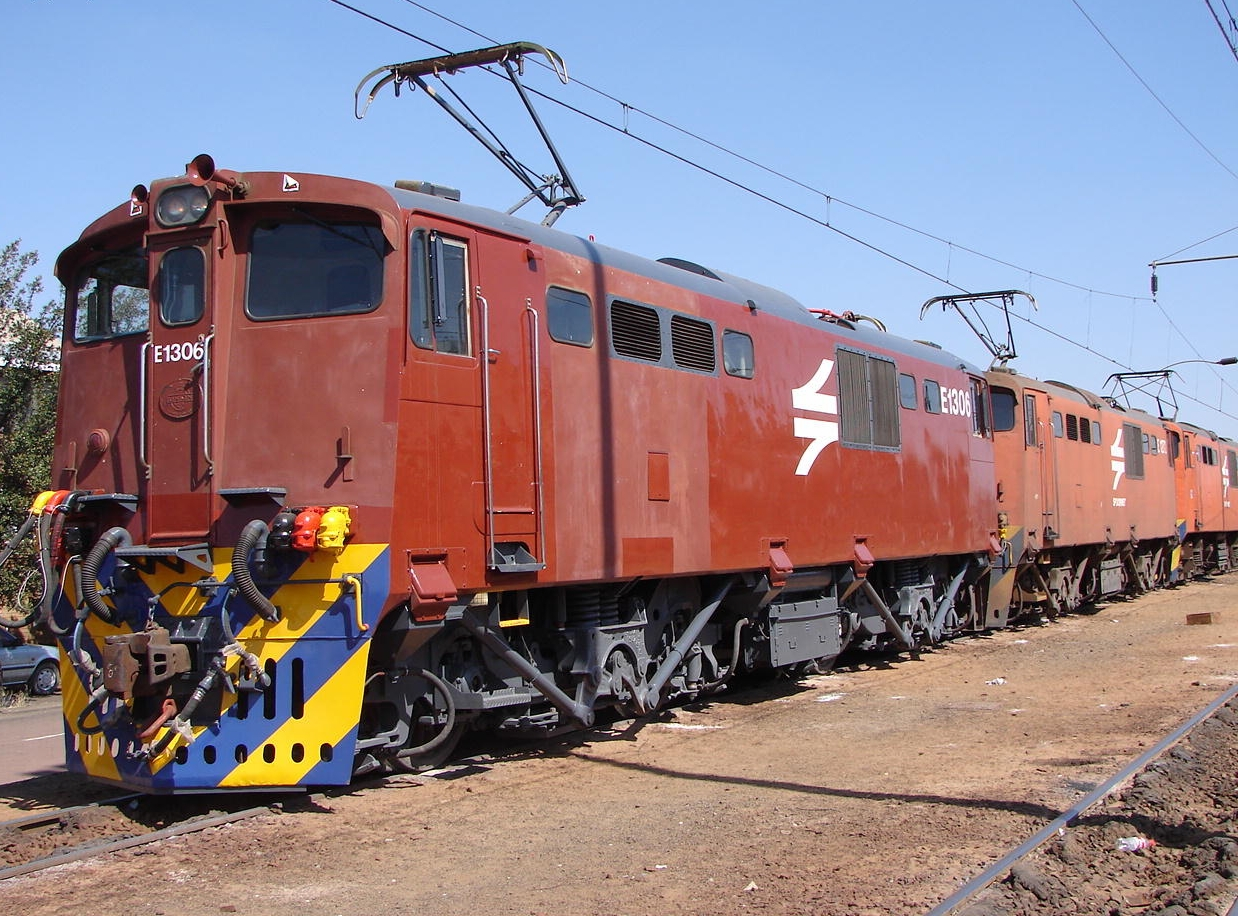
- E1306 at Beaconsfield depot in August 2007
Type and origin
- Power type: Electric
- Designer: Union Carriage & Wagon
- Builder: Union Carriage & Wagon
- Model: UCW 6E1
- Build date: 1971-1973
- Total produced: 150
- Rebuilder: Transnet Rail Engineering
- Rebuild date: 2010-2015
- Number rebuilt: 66 to Class 18E, Series 2
Specifications
- Configuration
  - AAR: B-B
  - UIC: Bo'Bo'
  - Commonwealth: Bo-Bo
- Gauge: 3 ft 6 in (1,067 mm) Cape gauge
- Wheel diameter: 1,220 mm (48.03 in)
- Wheelbase: 11,279 mm (37 ft 1/16 in)
  - Bogie: 3,430 mm (11 ft 3 in)
- Pivot centres: 7,849 mm (25 ft 9 in)
- Panto shoes: 6,972 mm (22 ft 10 1/2 in)
- Length
  - Over couplers: 15,494 mm (50 ft 10 in)
  - Over body: 14,631 mm (48 ft 0 in)
- Width: 2,896 mm (9 ft 6 in)
- Height
  - Pantograph: 4,089 mm (13 ft 5 in)
  - Body height: 3,937 mm (12 ft 11 in)
- Axle load: 22,226 kg (49,000 lb)
- Adhesive weight: 88,904 kg (196,000 lb)
- Loco weight: 88,904 kg (196,000 lb)
- Electric system/s: 3 kV DC catenary
- Current pickup(s): Pantographs
- Traction motors: Four AEI-283AZ
  - Rating 1 hour: 623 kW (835 hp)
  - Continuous: 563 kW (755 hp)
- Gear ratio: 18:67
- Loco brake: Air & Regenerative
- Train brakes: Air & Vacuum
- Couplers: AAR knuckle
Performance figures
- Maximum speed: 113 km/h (70 mph)
- Power output
  - 1 hour: 2,492 kW (3,342 hp)
  - Continuous: 2,252 kW (3,020 hp)
- Tractive effort
  - Starting: 311 kN (70,000 lbf)
  - 1 hour: 221 kN (50,000 lbf)
  - Continuous: 193 kN (43,000 lbf) @ 40 km/h (25 mph)
Career
- Operators: South African Railways; Spoornet; Transnet Freight Rail
- Class: Class 6E1
- Number in class: 150
- Numbers: E1296-E1445
- Delivered: 1971-1973
- First run: 1971

The South African Railways Class 6E1, Series 3 of 1971 was an electric locomotive.

Between 1971 and 1973, the South African Railways placed 150 Class 6E1, Series 3 electric locomotives with a Bo-Bo wheel arrangement in mainline service.

== Manufacturer ==
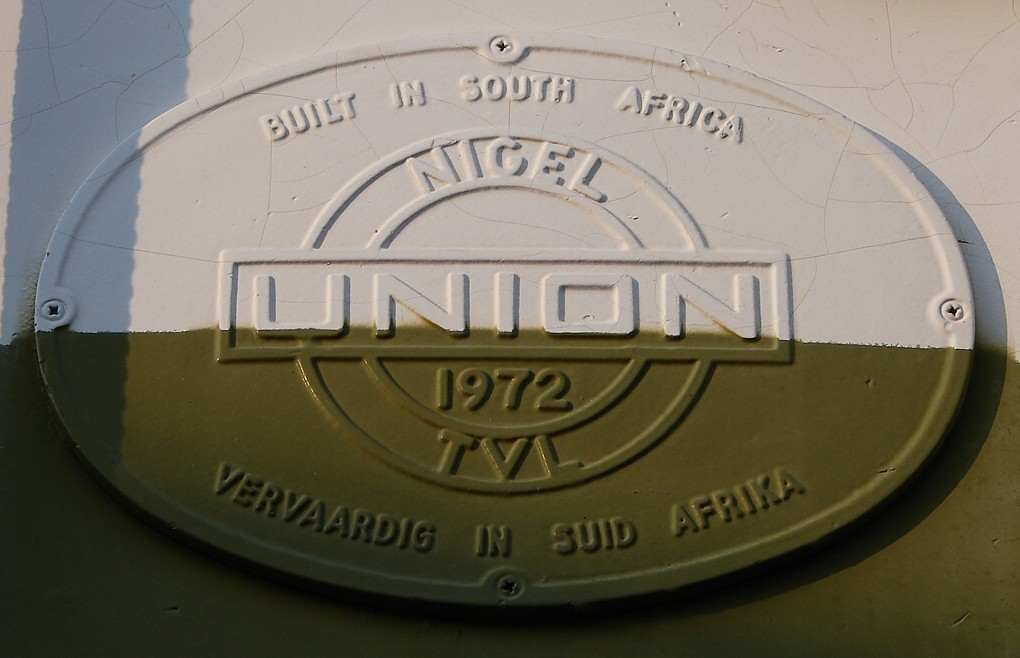
Builder's plate

The 3 kV DC Class 6E1, Series 3 electric locomotive was designed and built for the South African Railways (SAR) by Union Carriage & Wagon (UCW) in Nigel, Transvaal, with the electrical equipment being supplied by the General Electric Company (GEC).

One hundred and fifty units were delivered between 1971 and 1973, numbered in the range from E1296 to E1445. Like Series 1 and 2, Series 3 units were equipped with four AEI-283AZ axle-hung traction motors. UCW did not allocate builder's numbers to the locomotives it built for the SAR and used the SAR unit numbers for their record keeping.

== Characteristics ==
=== Orientation ===
These dual cab locomotives had a roof access ladder on one side only, just to the right of the cab access door. The roof access ladder end was marked as the no. 2 end. A corridor along the centre of the unit connected the cabs which were identical apart from the fact that the handbrake was located in cab 2. A pantograph hook stick was stowed in a tube mounted below the bottom edge of the locomotive body on the roof access ladder side. The units had one square and two rectangular access panels along the lower half of the body on the roof access ladder side, and only one square access panel on the opposite side.

=== Series identifying features ===
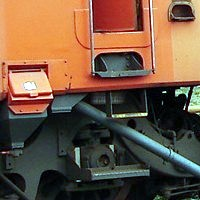
Narrow stirrup on E1345

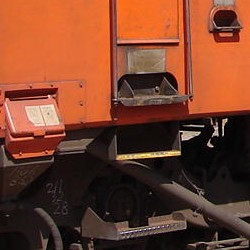
Wide stirrup on E1346

The Class 6E1 was produced in eleven series over a period of nearly sixteen years, with altogether 960 units placed in service, all built by UCW. While some Class 6E1 series were visually indistinguishable from their predecessors or successors, some externally visible changes did occur over the years.

The fifty Series 2 and the first fifty Series 3 units are visually indistinguishable from each other. On the Series 3 units in the number range from E1346 to E1445, an externally visible difference is a wider stirrup below their side doors.

This appears to indicate that Series 2 should actually have consisted of one hundred units and not fifty, firstly since unit numbers E1246 to E1345 are identical in exterior appearance and secondly since Series 4, 5 and 6 were all delivered in batches of one hundred. In addition, Series 2 and 3 used the same AEI-283AZ traction motors.

== Service ==
The Class 6E1 family saw service all over both 3 kV DC mainline and branch line networks, the smaller Cape Western mainline between Cape Town and Beaufort West and the larger network which covers portions of the Northern Cape, the Free State, Natal, Gauteng, North West and Mpumalanga.

== Reclassification and rebuilding ==
=== Reclassification to Class 16E ===
During 1990 and 1991, Spoornet semi-permanently coupled several pairs of otherwise largely unmodified Class 6E1 units, reclassified them to Class 16E and allocated a single locomotive number to each pair, with the individual units in the pairs inscribed "A" or "B". The aim was to accomplish savings on cab maintenance by coupling the units at their no. 1 ends, abandoning the no. 1 end cabs in terms of maintenance and using only the no. 2 end cabs.

One such pair was made up of two Series 3 units, numbers E1418 and E1419, which became Class 16E no. 16-227A and B respectively.

=== Rebuilding to Class 18E ===
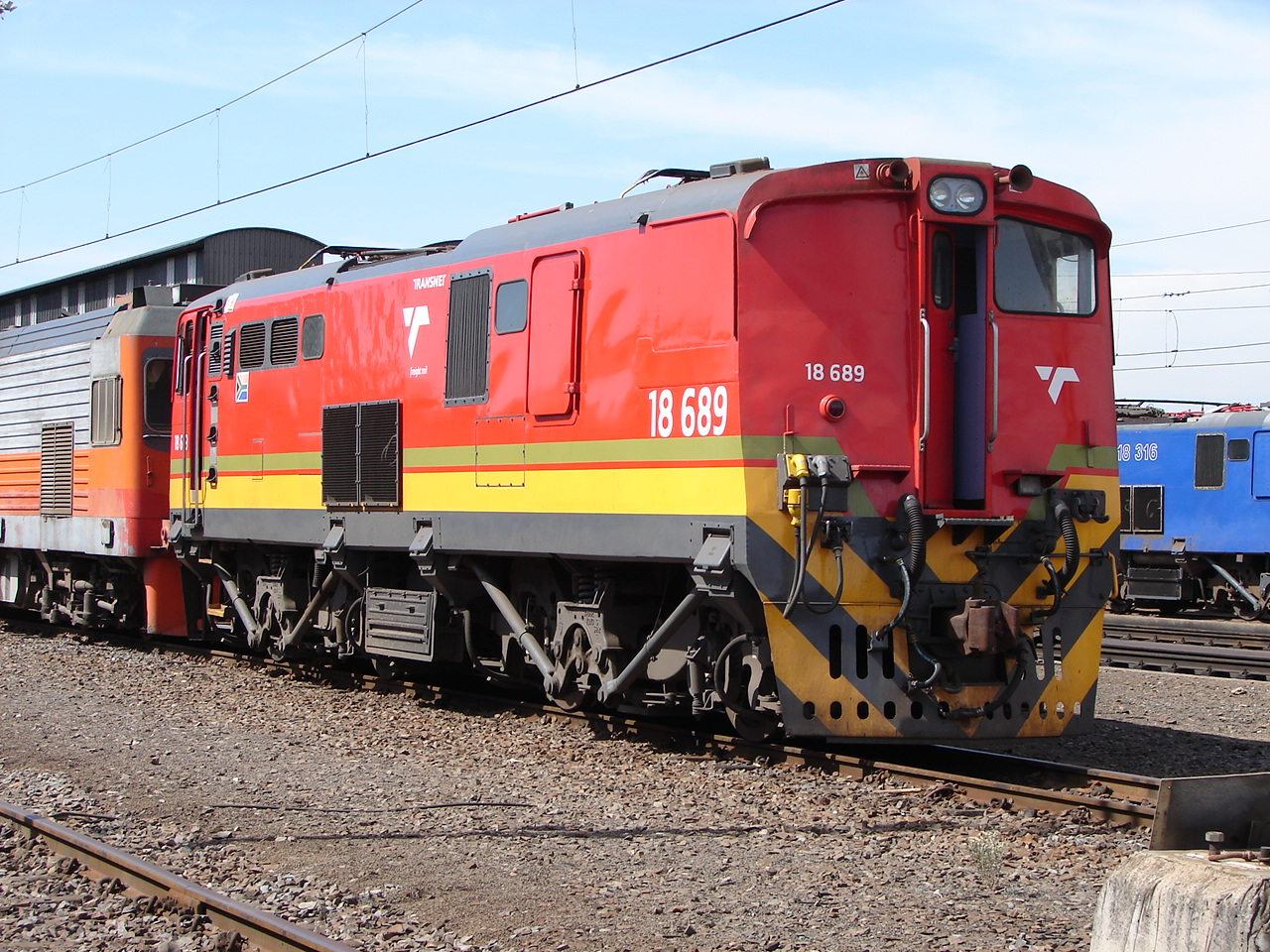
Cab 1 of Class 18E no. 18-689, ex Class 6E1 no. E1390, Bellville Depot, 31 January 2013

Beginning in 2000, Spoornet began a project to rebuild Series 2 to 11 Class 6E1 units to Class 18E, Series 1 and Series 2 at the Transnet Rail Engineering workshops at Koedoespoort. In the process the cab at the no. 1 end was stripped of all controls and the driver's front and side windows were blanked off to have a toilet installed, thereby forfeiting the loco's bi-directional ability.

Since the driving cab's noise level had to be below 85 decibels, cab 2 was selected as the Class 18E driving cab primarily based on its lower noise level compared to cab 1, which is closer and more exposed to the compressor's noise and vibration. Another factor was the closer proximity of cab 2 to the low voltage switch panel. The fact that the handbrake was located in cab 2 was not a deciding factor, but was considered an additional benefit.

The known Class 6E1, Series 3 units which were used in this project, were all rebuilt to Class 18E, Series 2 locomotives. Their numbers and renumbering details are listed in the table.

Class 6E1, Series 3 units rebuilt to Class 18E as on 19 January 2015
Count	6E1 no.	Year built	18E no.	18E series	Year rebuilt	Notes
1	E1297	1971-72	18-761	2	2013	
2	E1298	1971-72	18-776	2	2013	c. 2013
3	E1300	1971-72	18-435	2	2013	PRASA
4	E1303	1971-72	18-651	2	2011	
5	E1305	1971-72	18-861	2	2015	
6	E1310	1971-72	18-764	2	2013	
7	E1311	1971-72	18-695	2	2012	
8	E1313	1971-72	18-672	2	2011	
9	E1315	1971-72	18-681	2	2011	
10	E1316	1971-72	18-704	2	2012	
11	E1319	1971-72	18-707	2	2012	
12	E1320	1971-72	18-788	2	2014	c. 2014
13	E1322	1971-72	18-677	2	2012	
14	E1323	1971-72	18-682	2	2012	
15	E1325	1971-72	18-679	2	2012	
16	E1326	1971-72	18-743	2	2013	
17	E1327	1971-72	18-791	2	2014	c. 2014
18	E1329	1972	18-807	2	2014	
19	E1330	1972	18-806	2	2014	
20	E1331	1972	18-706	2	2012	
21	E1336	1972	18-678	2	2011	
22	E1337	1972	18-676	2	2011	
23	E1343	1972	18-759	2	2013	
24	E1346	1972	18-748	2	2013	
25	E1353	1972	18-771	2	2013	
26	E1358	1972	18-721	2	2012	
27	E1361	1972	18-766	2	2013	
28	E1363	1972	18-684	2	2012	
29	E1367	1972	18-732	2	2013	
30	E1369	1972	18-724	2	2013	
31	E1370	1972	18-793	2	2014	c. 2014
32	E1371	1972	18-680	2	2011	
33	E1372	1972	18-745	2	2013	
34	E1375	1972	18-683	2	2011	
35	E1379	1972	18-434	2	2013	PRASA
36	E1380	1972	18-812	2	2014	
37	E1385	1972	18-427	2	2013	PRASA
38	E1386	1972	18-685	2	2011	
39	E1390	1972-73	18-689	2	2011	
40	E1397	1972-73	18-430	2	2013	PRASA
41	E1399	1973	18-646	2	2010	
42	E1400	1973	18-653	2	2011	
43	E1402	1973	18-775	2	2013	c. 2013
44	E1405	1973	18-860	2	2015	
45	E1406	1973	18-747	2	2013	
46	E1407	1973	18-773	2	2013	
47	E1408	1973	18-735	2	2013	
48	E1410	1973	18-796	2	2014	c. 2014
49	E1413	1973	18-783	2	2014	c. 2014
50	E1414	1973	18-423	2	2012	PRASA
51	E1415	1973	18-760	2	2013	
52	E1416	1973	18-744	2	2013	
53	E1419	1973	18-790	2	2014	c. 2014
54	E1421	1973	18-702	2	2012	
55	E1422	1973	18-655	2	2011	
56	E1423	1973	18-858	2	2015	
57	E1428	1973	18-652	2	2011	
58	E1429	1973	18-850	2	2015	
59	E1430	1973	18-762	2	2013	
60	E1433	1973	18-782	2	2014	c. 2014
61	E1434	1973	18-432	2	2013	PRASA
62	E1437	1973	18-422	2	2012	PRASA
63	E1440	1973	18-863	2	2015	
64	E1441	1973	18-808	2	2014	
65	E1442	1973	18-673	2	2011	
66	E1444	1973	18-859	2	2015	

== Liveries ==
With five exceptions, the whole series was delivered in the SAR Gulf Red livery with signal red cowcatchers, yellow whiskers and with the number plates on the sides mounted on three-stripe yellow wings. In the 1990s many of the Series 3 units began to be repainted in the Spoornet orange livery with a yellow and blue chevron pattern on the cowcatchers. Several later received the Spoornet maroon livery. In the late 1990s at least two were repainted in the Spoornet blue livery with solid numbers and at least one in the Spoornet blue livery with outline numbers.

The five exceptions, numbers E1341 to E1345, were delivered in blue with yellow whiskers for use on the Blue Train between the Rand and Kimberley. In about 1985, these five were replaced by the five ex MetroBlitz Class 12E locomotives which were then all repainted in blue and whiskers. The five blue Series 3 locomotives were all eventually repainted in Spoornet's orange livery.

In 2009 no. E1328 was withdrawn from road service and repainted in a white and dull green livery for use as apprentice trade test locomotive at Sentrarand.

== Illustration ==
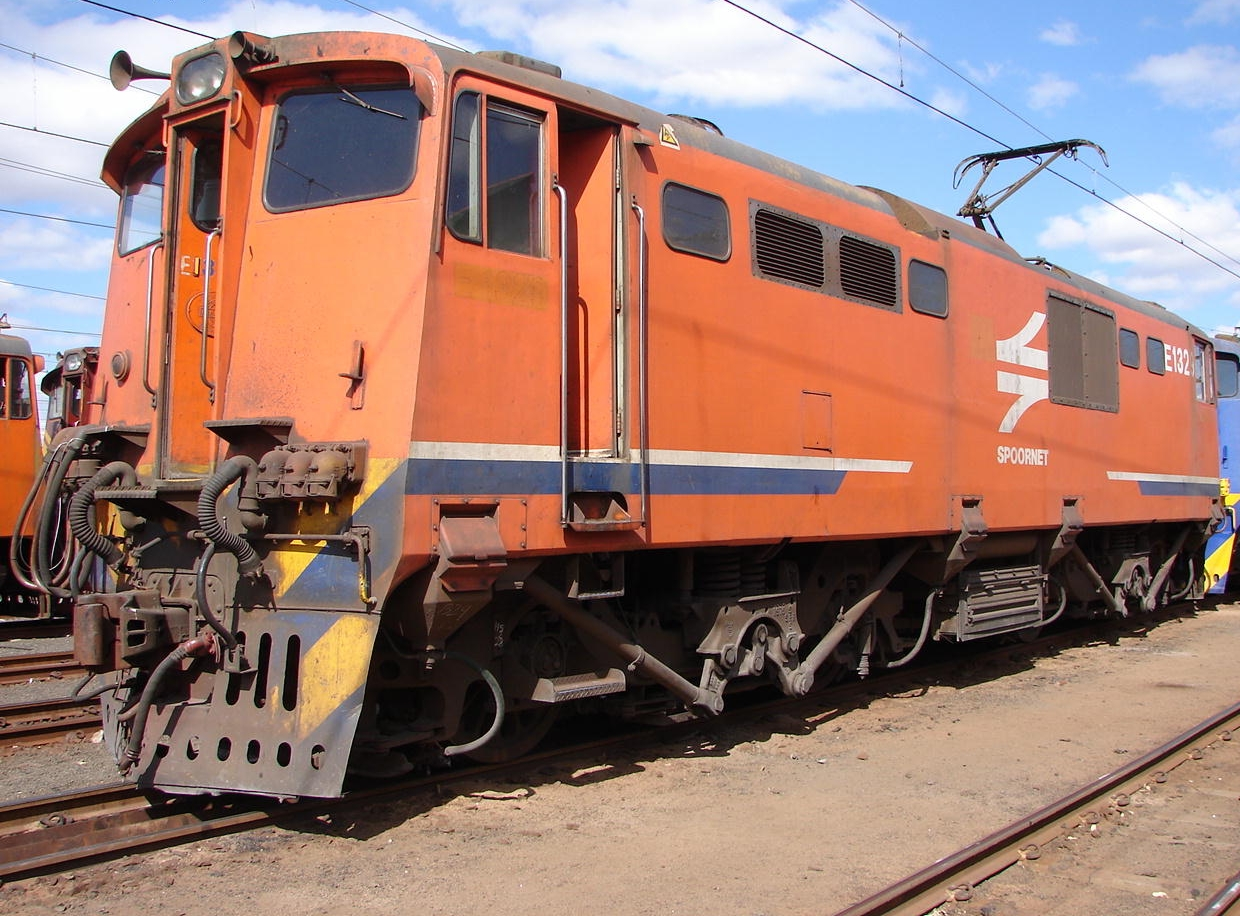
No. E1329 in Spoornet lined orange livery at Ladysmith, 5 August 2007

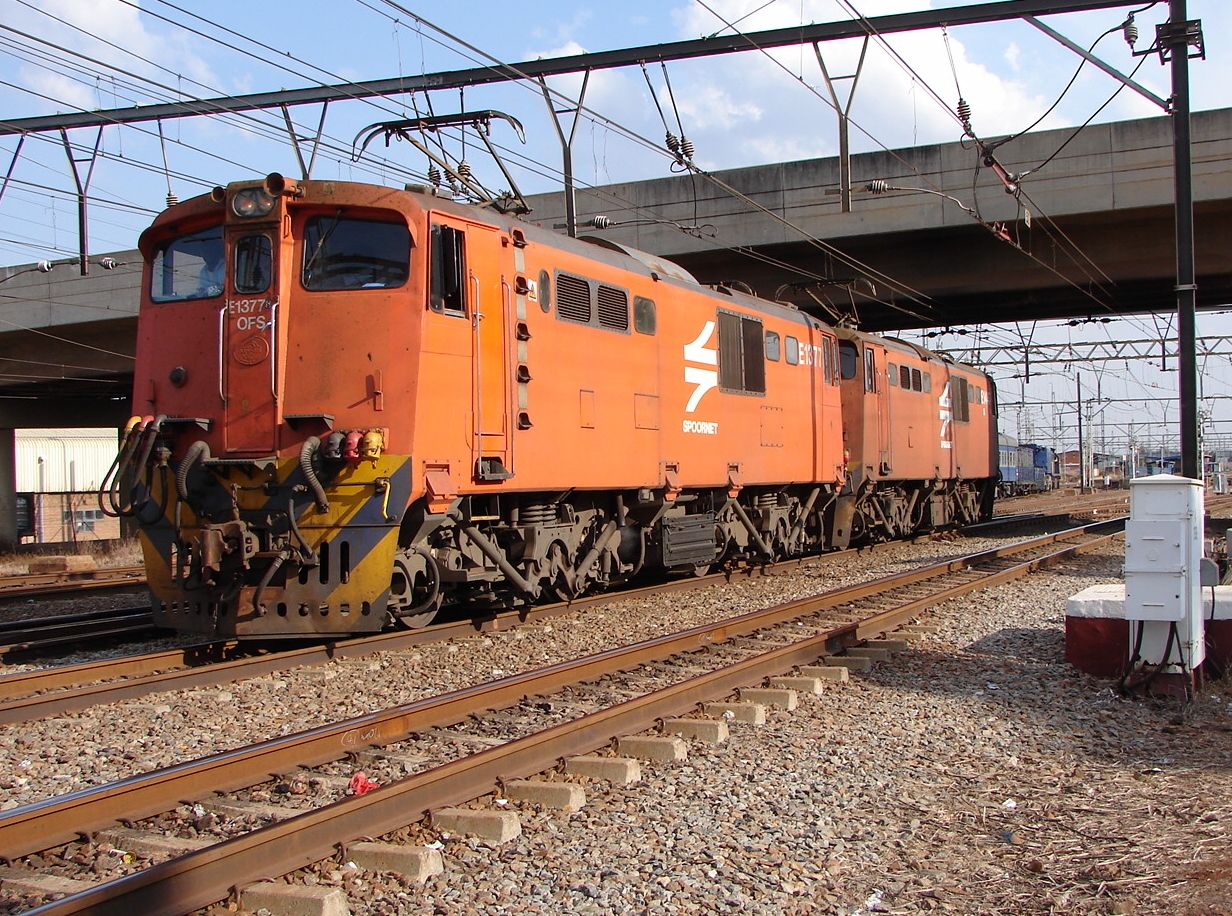
No. E1377 in Spoornet orange livery at Kaalfontein, 23 September 2009

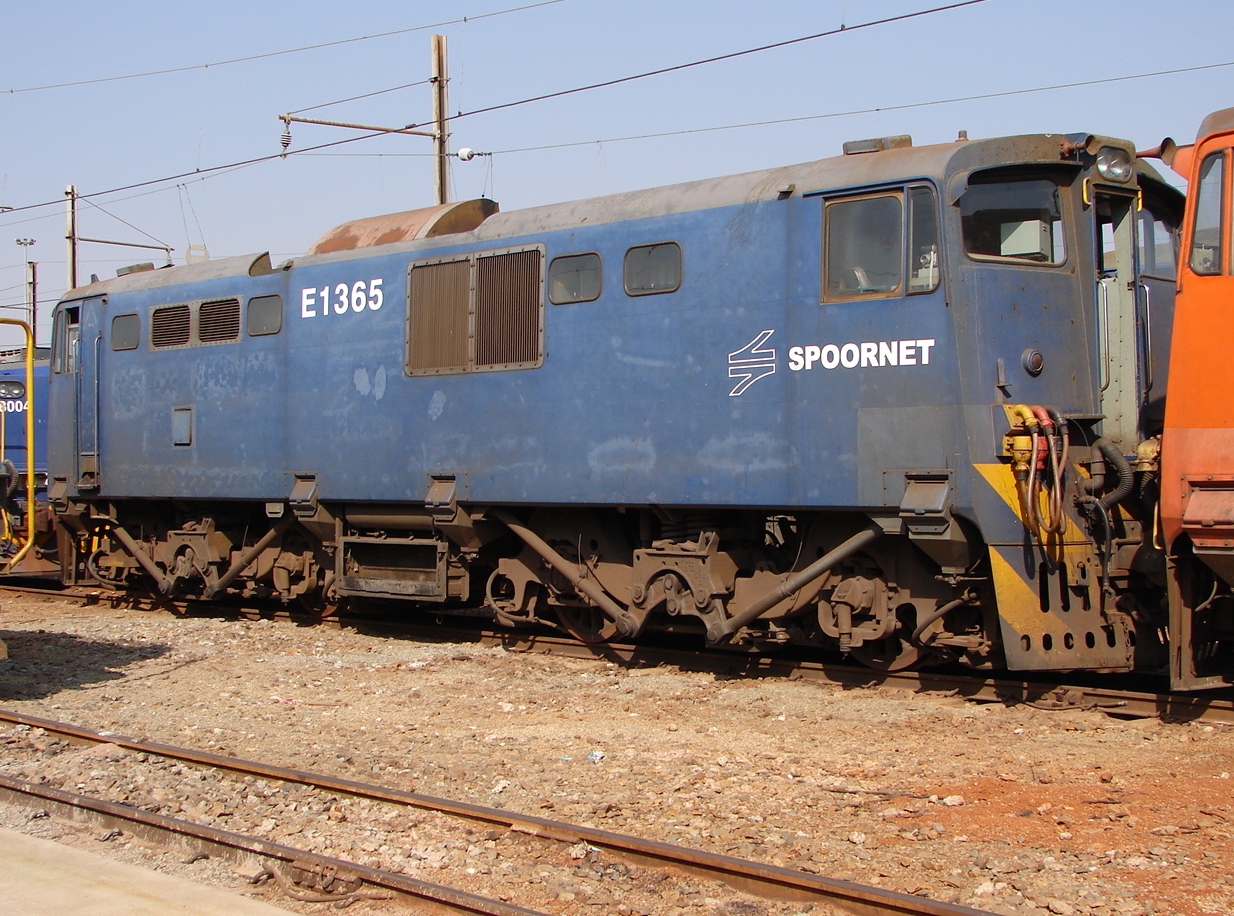
No. E1365 in Spoornet blue with solid numbers, Sentrarand, 22 September 2009

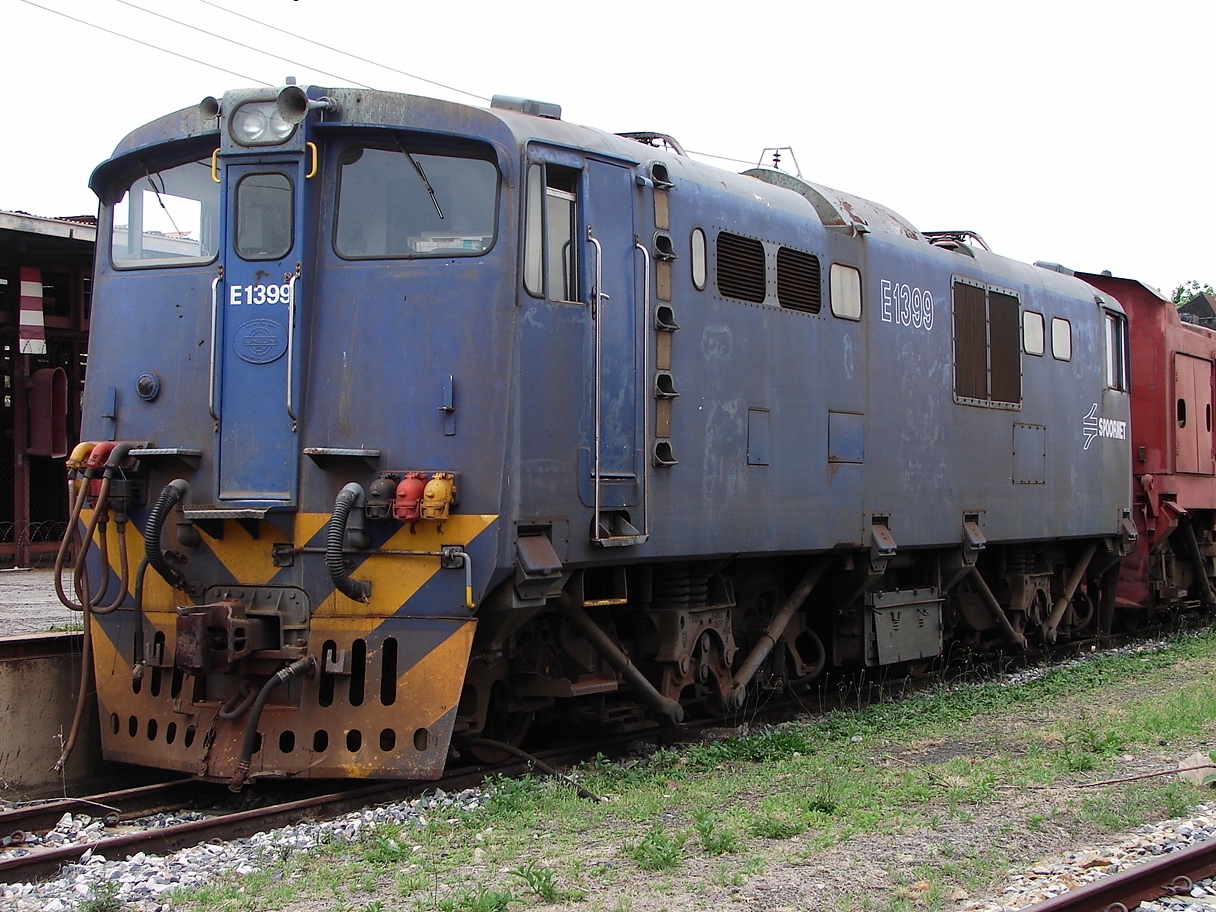
No. E1399 in Spoornet blue with outline numbers at Koedoespoort, 9 October 2009

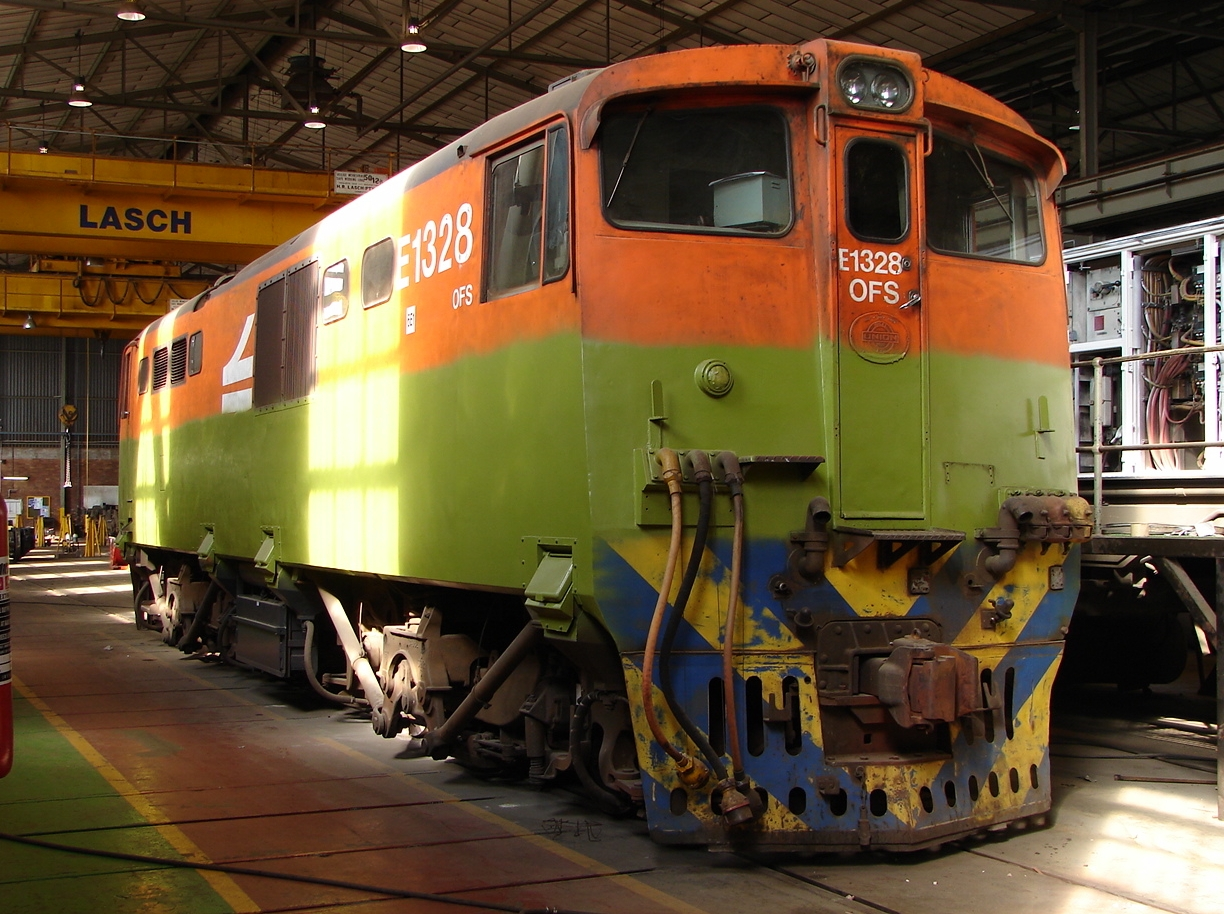
No. E1328 being repainted in a shop livery at Sentrarand, 22 September 2009

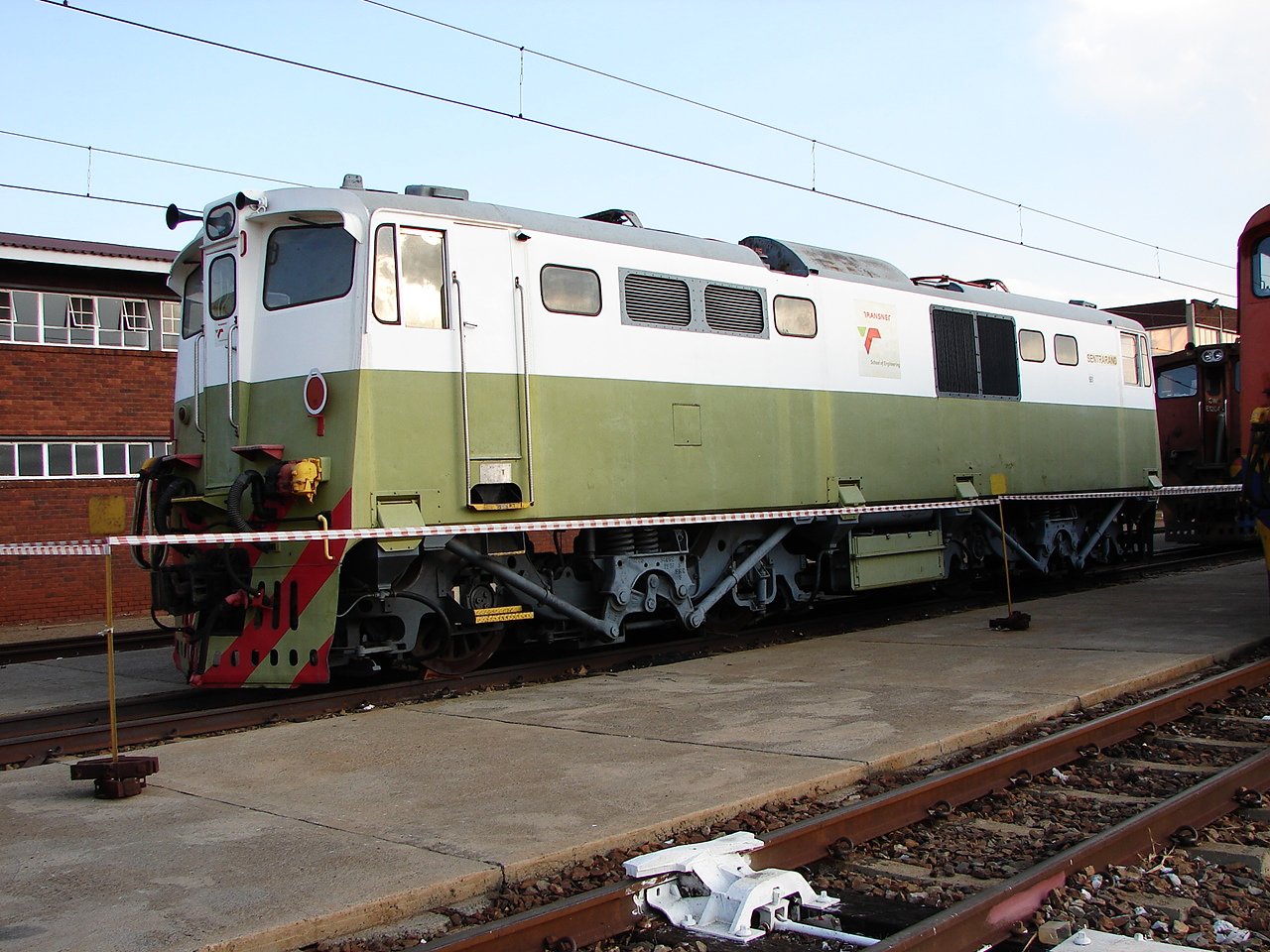
No. E1328 as trade test locomotive at Sentrarand, 18 May 2013
