= South African Class 6E1, Series 10 =

Type of electric locomotive

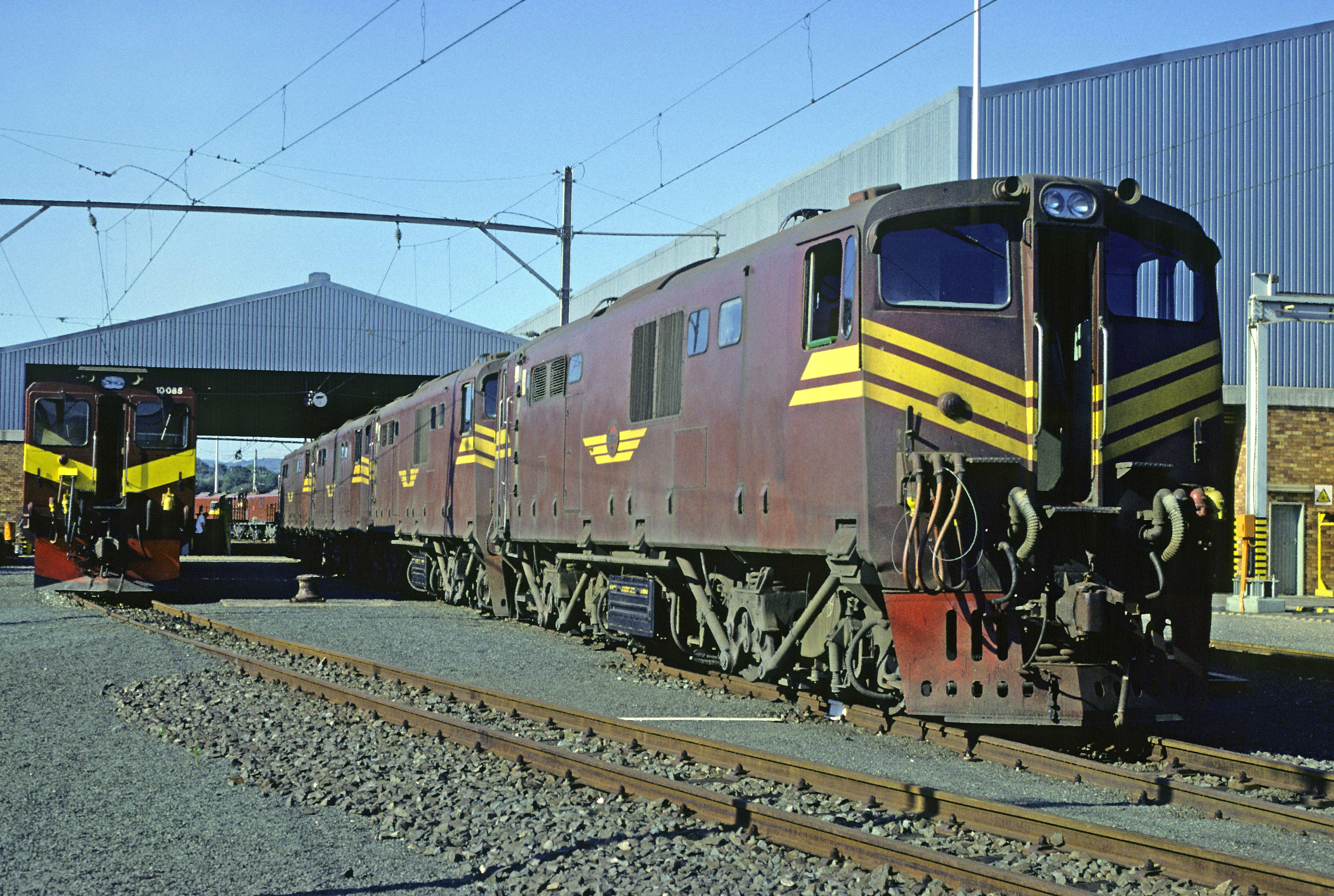
- E2133 at Nelspruit, 22 October 1990
Type and origin
- Power type: Electric
- Designer: Union Carriage & Wagon
- Builder: Union Carriage & Wagon
- Model: UCW 6E1
- Build date: 1982–1984
- Total produced: 55
- Rebuilder: Transnet Rail Engineering
- Rebuild date: 2001–2005
- Number rebuilt: 53 to Class 18E, Series 1
Specifications
- Configuration
  - AAR: B-B
  - UIC: Bo'Bo'
  - Commonwealth: Bo-Bo
- Gauge: 3 ft 6 in (1,067 mm) Cape gauge
- Wheel diameter: 1,220 mm (48.03 in)
- Wheelbase: 11,279 mm (37 ft 0 in)
  - Bogie: 3,430 mm (11 ft 3 in)
- Pivot centres: 7,849 mm (25 ft 9 in)
- Panto shoes: 6,972 mm (22 ft 10 1/2 in)
- Length
  - Over couplers: 15,494 mm (50 ft 10 in)
  - Over body: 14,631 mm (48 ft 0 in)
- Width: 2,896 mm (9 ft 6 in)
- Height
  - Pantograph: 4,089 mm (13 ft 5 in)
  - Body height: 3,937 mm (12 ft 11 in)
- Axle load: 22,447 kg (49,487 lb)
- Adhesive weight: 89,788 kg (197,949 lb)
- Loco weight: 89,788 kg (197,949 lb)
- Electric system/s: 3 kV DC catenary
- Current pickup(s): Pantographs
- Traction motors: Four AEI-283AY
  - Rating 1 hour: 623 kW (835 hp)
  - Continuous: 563 kW (755 hp)
- Gear ratio: 18:67
- Loco brake: Air & Regenerative
- Train brakes: Air & Vacuum
- Couplers: AAR knuckle
Performance figures
- Maximum speed: 113 km/h (70 mph)
- Power output
  - 1 hour: 2,492 kW (3,342 hp)
  - Continuous: 2,252 kW (3,020 hp)
- Tractive effort
  - Starting: 311 kN (70,000 lbf)
  - 1 hour: 221 kN (50,000 lbf)
  - Continuous: 193 kN (43,000 lbf) @ 40 km/h (25 mph)
Career
- Operators: South African Railways; Spoornet
- Class: Class 6E1
- Number in class: 55
- Numbers: E2086-E2140
- Delivered: 1982–1984
- First run: 1982
- Last run: 2005

The South African Railways Class 6E1, Series 10 of 1982 was an electric locomotive.

Between 1982 and 1984, the South African Railways placed 55 Class 6E1, Series 10 electric locomotives with a Bo-Bo wheel arrangement in service.

== Manufacturer ==
The 3 kV DC Class 6E1, Series 10 electric locomotive was designed and built for the South African Railways (SAR) by Union Carriage & Wagon (UCW) in Nigel, Transvaal. The electrical equipment was supplied by the General Electric Company (GEC).

Between 1982 and 1984, 55 locomotives were delivered, numbered in the range from E2086 to E2140. Like Series 6 to 9, the Series 10 units were equipped with AEI-283AY traction motors. UCW did not allocate builder's numbers to the locomotives it built for the SAR, but used the SAR unit numbers for their record keeping.

== Characteristics ==
=== Orientation ===
These dual cab locomotives had a roof access ladder on one side only, just to the right of the cab access door. The roof access ladder end was marked as the no. 2 end. A corridor along the centre of the locomotive connected the cabs which were identical apart from the fact that the handbrake was located in cab 2. A pantograph hook stick was stowed in a tube, mounted below the lower edge of the locomotive body on the roof access ladder side. The locomotive had one square and two rectangular access panels along the lower half of the body and a large hatch door below the second small window to the right of the side door on the roof access ladder side, and only one square access panel and a large hatch door below the first window immediately to the right of the door on the opposite side.

=== Series identifying features ===
The Class 6E1 was produced in eleven series over a period of nearly sixteen years. While some of the Class 6E1 series are visually indistinguishable from their predecessors or successors, some externally visible changes did occur over the years.

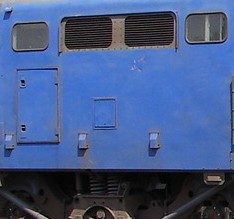
Drainage holes on Series 9 to 11

Series 8 and later locomotives could be distinguished from all older models by the large hatch door on each side.

The Series 9 to Series 11 locomotives were visually indistinguishable from each other, but could be distinguished from all earlier models by the rainwater drainage holes on their lower sides. These holes were usually covered by so-called buckets, but the covers were absent on a few locomotives. Another distinction was the end doors, which were recessed into the doorframes on Series 9 to Series 11 locomotives, compared to earlier models which had their end doors flush with the doorframes. In addition, on Series 9 and later, the split side window on the driver's assistant side was replaced by a single rectangular side window with rounded corners. Finally, unlike all earlier models, all four doors on Series 9 to Series 11 locomotives had rounded corners.

=== Crew access ===
The Class 5E, 5E1, 6E and earlier 6E1 locomotives were notoriously difficult to enter from ground level, since their lever-style door handles were at waist level when standing inside the cab. This made it impossible to open the door from outside without first climbing up high enough to reach the door handle, while hanging on to the side handrails with one hand only. Crews therefore often chose to leave the doors ajar when parking and exiting the locomotives.

Side doors with two interconnected latch handles on the outside, such as those which were introduced on the Class 7E1, with one outside handle mounted near floor level and the other at mid-door level, were also introduced on Class 6E1 locomotives beginning with Series 9.

== Service ==
The Class 6E1 family saw service all over both 3 kV DC mainline and branch line networks, the smaller Cape Western mainline between Cape Town and Beaufort West and the larger network which covers portions of the Northern Cape, the Free State, Natal, Gauteng, North West and Mpumalanga.

== Rebuilding to Class 18E ==
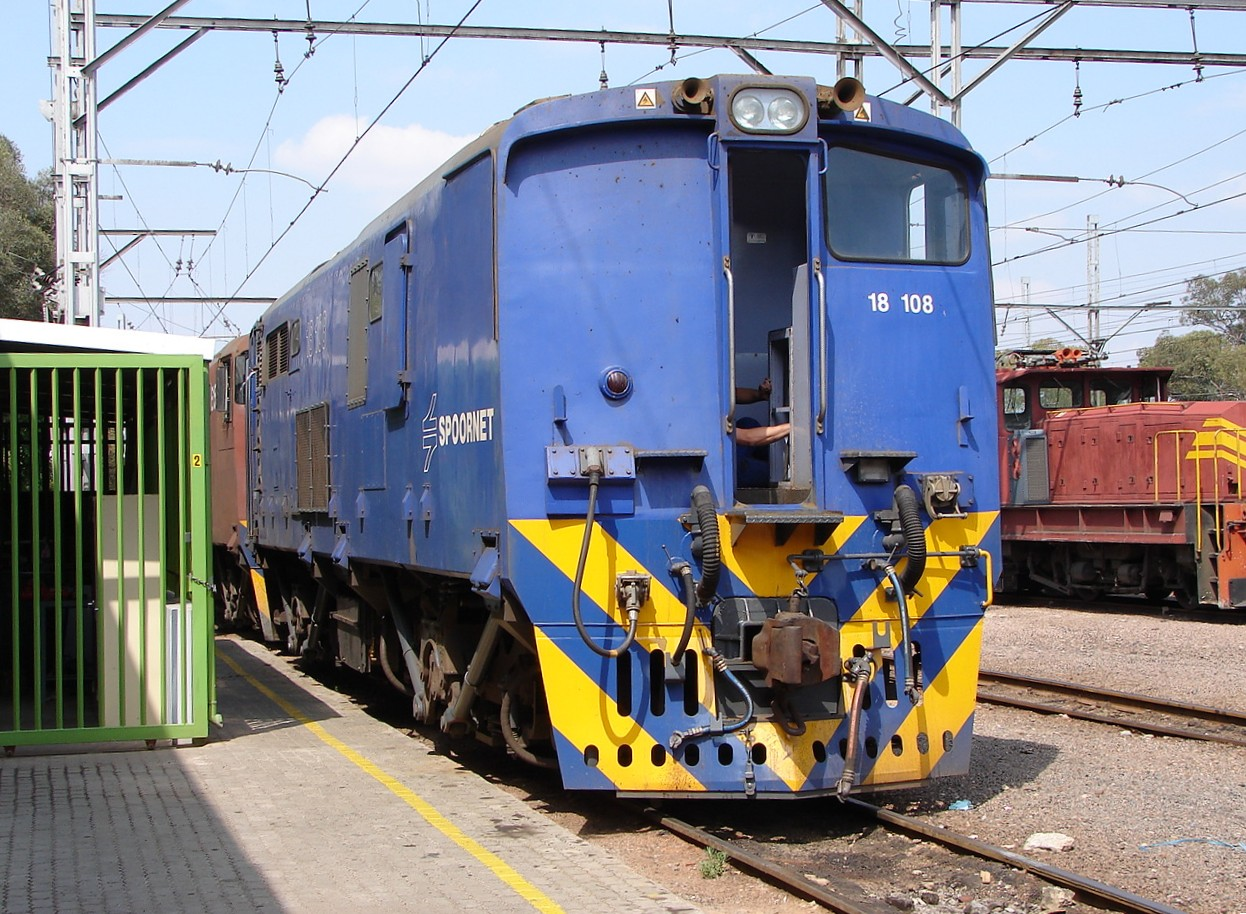
Cab 1 of Class 18E no. 18-108, ex Class 6E1 no. E2114, Capital Park, 1 October 2009

Beginning in 2000, Spoornet began a project to rebuild Series 2 to 11 Class 6E1 locomotives to Class 18E, Series 1 and Series 2 at the Transnet Rail Engineering (TRE) workshops at Koedoespoort. In the process, the cab at the no. 1 end was stripped of all controls and the driver's front and side windows were blanked off to have a toilet installed, thereby forfeiting the locomotive's bi-directional ability.

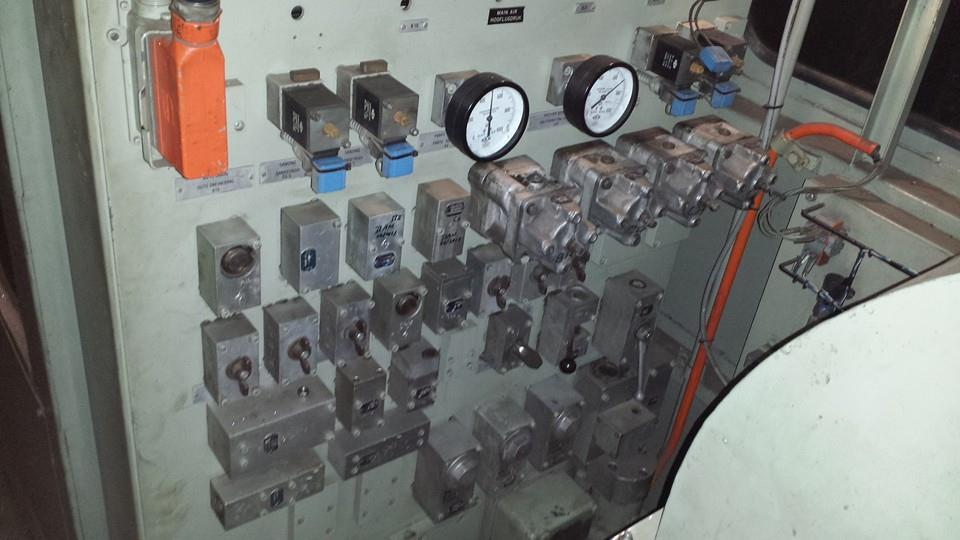
Brake rack in Class 18E no. 18-089

Since the driving cab's noise level had to be below 85 decibels, cab 2 was selected as the Class 18E driving cab primarily based on its lower noise level compared to cab 1, which was closer and more exposed to the compressor's noise and vibration. Another factor was the closer proximity of cab 2 to the low voltage switch panel. The fact that the handbrake was located in cab 2 was not a deciding factor but was considered an additional benefit.

While the earlier Class 6E1, Series 2 to 7 locomotives had been built with a brake system which consisted of various valves connected to each other with pipes, commonly referred to as a "bicycle frame" brake system, the Class 6E1, Series 8 to 11 locomotives were built with an air equipment frame brake system, commonly referred to as a brake rack. Since the design of the rebuilt Class 18E locomotives included the same brake rack, the rebuilding project was begun with the newer series 8 to 11 locomotives to reduce the overall cost of rebuilding.

By June 2005 all Series 10 locomotives except numbers E2111 and E2134 were rebuilt to Class 18E, Series 1. The fate of the two exceptions is not known and they are presumed to have been scrapped. The numbers and renumbering details of the rebuilt units are listed in the table.

Class 6E1, Series 10 units rebuilt to Class 18E
Count	6E1 no.	Year built	18E no.	18E series	Year rebuilt	Notes
1	E2086	1982	18-158	1	2004	
2	E2087	1982	18-046	1	2002	
3	E2088	1982	18-089	1	2003	
4	E2089	1983	18-023	1	2002	
5	E2090	1983	18-130	1	2004	
6	E2091	1983	18-176	1	2004	
7	E2092	1983	18-164	1	2005	
8	E2093	1983	18-059	1	2002	
9	E2094	1983	18-126	1	2004	
10	E2095	1983	18-039	1	2002	
11	E2096	1983	18-174	1	2004	
12	E2097	1983	18-180	1	2005	
13	E2098	1983	18-179	1	2005	
14	E2099	1983	18-053	1	2002	
15	E2100	1983	18-149	1	2004	
16	E2101	1983	18-166	1	2003	
17	E2102	1983	18-044	1	2002	
18	E2103	1983	18-175	1	2004	
19	E2104	1983	18-160	1	2005	
20	E2105	1983	18-102	1	2003	
21	E2106	1983	18-004	1	2001	
22	E2107	1983	18-186	1	2005	
23	E2108	1983	18-177	1	2004	
24	E2109	1983	18-081	1	2003	
25	E2110	1983	18-052	1	2002	
26	E2112	1983	18-060	1	2002	
27	E2113	1983	18-151	1	2004	
28	E2114	1983	18-108	1	2004	
29	E2115	1983	18-191	1	2005	
30	E2116	1983	18-099	1	2003	
31	E2117	1983	18-155	1	2004	
32	E2118	1983	18-096	1	2003	
33	E2119	1983	18-024	1	2002	
34	E2120	1983	18-122	1	2004	
35	E2121	1983	18-113	1	2004	
36	E2122	1983	18-085	1	2003	
37	E2123	1983	18-103	1	2003	
38	E2124	1983	18-076	1	2003	
39	E2125	1983	18-016	1	2002	
40	E2126	1984	18-082	1	2003	
41	E2127	1984	18-131	1	2004	
42	E2128	1984	18-032	1	2002	
43	E2129	1984	18-043	1	2002	
44	E2130	1984	18-121	1	2004	
45	E2131	1984	18-040	1	2002	to 18-862
46	E2132	1984	18-047	1	2002	
47	E2133	1984	18-123	1	2004	
48	E2135	1984	18-114	1	2004	
49	E2136	1984	18-132	1	2004	
50	E2137	1984	18-115	1	2004	
51	E2138	1984	18-088	1	2003	
52	E2139	1984	18-128	1	2004	
53	E2140	1984	18-153	1	2004	

== Liveries ==
All the Class 6E1, Series 10 locomotives were delivered in the SAR red oxide livery with signal red cowcatchers, yellow whiskers and with the number plates on the sides mounted on three-stripe yellow wings. In the 1990s some of the Series 10 units were repainted in the Spoornet orange livery with a yellow and blue chevron pattern on the cowcatchers.
