= Scheffel bogie =

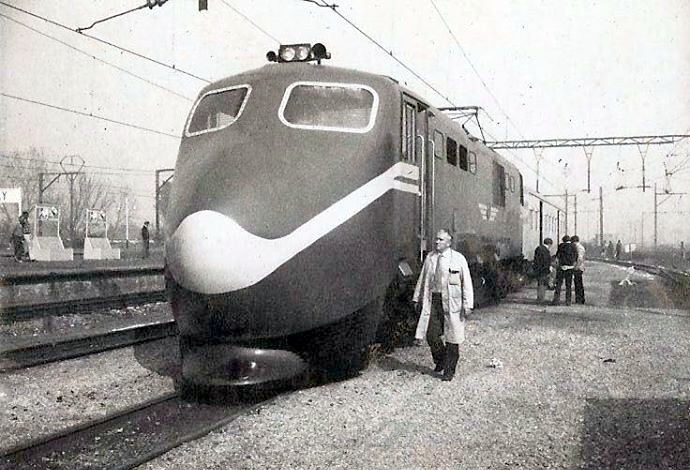
South African Class 6E1, Series 4 unit no. E1525 with re-geared traction motors, Scheffel bogies, and a streamlined nose cone on the no. 1 end. In this configuration, no. E1525 reached a speed of 245 kilometres per hour (152 miles per hour), which remains the world narrow-gauge speed record.

A Scheffel bogie is a flexible, high-stability radial bogie designed to reduce lateral force vibrations and accommodate turning on narrow gauge tracks at high speed. It first went into service in a fleet of South African Railway (SAR) ore wagons in 1975. It is named after its inventor, Dr. Herbert Scheffel, who designed the Scheffel bogie to facilitate the development of South Africa's 1,067 mm (3 ft 6 in) narrow-gauge railway system. The Scheffel bogie was used to set the world narrow gauge speed record of 245 kilometres per hour (152 mph) on Cape gauge tracks.

== See also ==
- Articles on bogies and trucks
