= South African Class 16E =

Type of electric locomotive

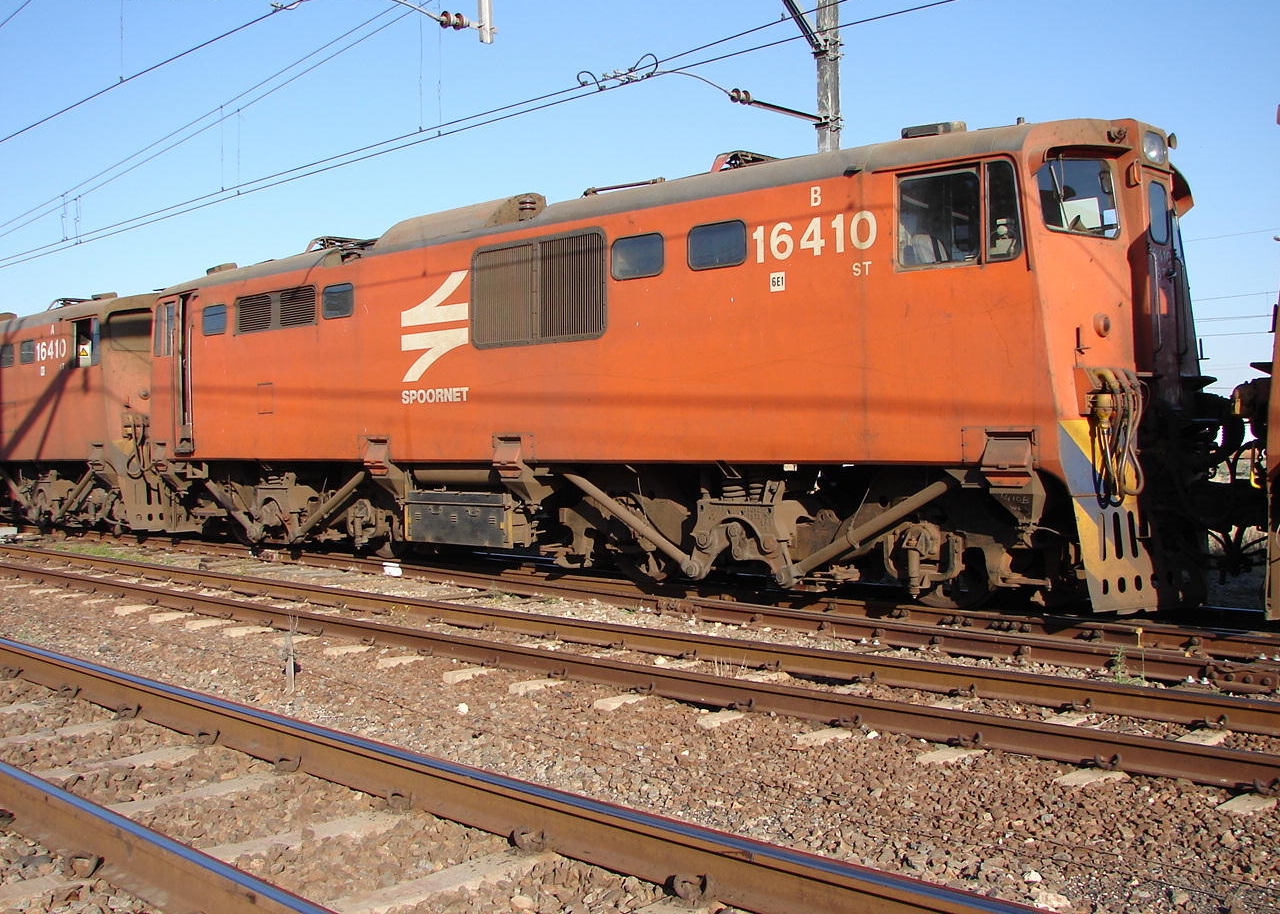
- 16-410B (E1851), Christiana, 22 September 2006
Type and origin
- Power type: Electric
- Designer: Union Carriage & Wagon
- Builder: Union Carriage & Wagon; Transwerk
- Model: UCW 6E1
- Build date: 1974-1979
- Rebuilder: Transnet Rail Engineering
- Rebuild date: 2002-2009
- Number rebuilt: 31 known to Class 18E, Series 1
Specifications
- Configuration
  - AAR: B-B
  - UIC: Bo′Bo′
  - Commonwealth: Bo-Bo
- Gauge: 3 ft 6 in (1,067 mm) Cape gauge
- Wheel diameter: 1,220 mm (48.0 in)
- Wheelbase: 11,279 mm (37 ft 0.1 in)
  - Bogie: 3,430 mm (11 ft 3.0 in)
- Pivot centres: 7,849 mm (25 ft 9.0 in)
- Panto shoes: 6,972 mm (22 ft 10.5 in)
- Length
  - Over couplers: 15,494 mm (50 ft 10.0 in)
  - Over body: 14,631 mm (48 ft 0 in)
- Width: 2,896 mm (9 ft 6.0 in)
- Height
  - Pantograph: 4,089 mm (13 ft 5.0 in)
  - Body height: 3,937 mm (12 ft 11.0 in)
- Axle load: 22,226 kg (49,000 lb)
- Adhesive weight: 88,904 kg (196,000 lb)
- Loco weight: 88,904 kg (196,000 lb)
- Electric system/s: 3 kV DC catenary
- Current pickup(s): Pantographs
- Traction motors: Four AEI-283AZ (Series 3-5); Four AEI-283AY (Series 6-7)
  - Rating 1 hour: 623 kW (835 hp)
  - Continuous: 563 kW (755 hp)
- Gear ratio: 18:67
- Loco brake: Air & Regenerative
- Train brakes: Air & Vacuum
- Couplers: AAR knuckle
Performance figures
- Maximum speed: 113 km/h (70 mph)
- Power output
  - 1 hour: 2,492 kW (3,342 hp)
  - Continuous: 2,252 kW (3,020 hp)
- Tractive effort
  - Starting: 311 kN (70,000 lbf)
  - 1 hour: 221 kN (50,000 lbf)
  - Continuous: 193 kN (43,000 lbf) @ 40 km/h (25 mph)
Career
- Operators: Spoornet
- Class: Class 16E
- First run: 1990

The Spoornet Class 16E of 1990 was a South African electric locomotive.

During 1990 and 1991, Spoornet semi-permanently coupled several pairs of otherwise unmodified Series 2 to Series 9 Class 6E1 electric locomotives, reclassified them to Class 16E and allocated a single shared unit number to each pair, with the individual locomotives in the pairs inscribed "A" or "B".

== Manufacturer ==
The 3 kV DC Class 6E1 electric locomotive was built for the South African Railways (SAR) by Union Carriage & Wagon (UCW) in Nigel, Transvaal. The electrical equipment was supplied by the General Electric Company (GEC). UCW did not allocate builder's numbers to the locomotives which it built for the SAR, but used the SAR unit numbers for their record keeping.

== Characteristics ==
=== Bogies ===
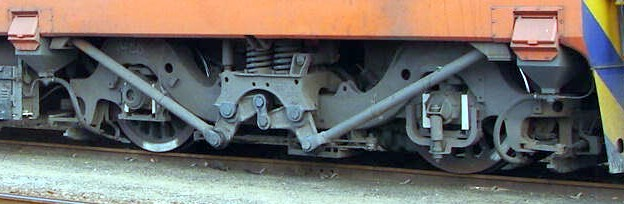
Class 6E1 Series 2 to 11 bogies

The Class 6E1 was built with sophisticated traction linkages on their bogies. Together with the locomotive's electronic wheel-slip detection system, these traction struts, mounted between the linkages on the bogies and the locomotive body and colloquially referred to as grasshopper legs, ensured the maximum transfer of power to the rails without causing wheel-slip by reducing the adhesion of the leading bogie and increasing that of the trailing bogie by as much as 15% upon starting. This feature was controlled by electronic wheel-slip detection devices and an electric weight transfer relay which reduced the anchor current to the leading bogie by as much as 50A in notches 2 to 16.

=== Brakes ===
The locomotive itself used air brakes, but it was equipped to operate trains with air or vacuum brakes. While hauling a vacuum braked train, the locomotive's air brake system would be disabled and the train would be controlled by using the train brakes alone to slow down and stop. While hauling an air braked train, on the other hand, the locomotive brakes would engage along with the train brakes. While working either type of train downgrade, the locomotive's regenerative braking system would also work in conjunction with the train brakes.

When the locomotive was stopped, the air brakes on both bogies were applied together. The handbrake or parking brake, located in cab no. 2, only operated on the unit's last axle, or no. 7 and 8 wheels.

=== Orientation ===
These dual-cab locomotives had a roof access ladder on one side only, just to the right of the cab access door. The roof access ladder end was marked as the no. 2 end. A corridor along the centre of the locomotive connected the cabs, which were identical apart from the fact that the handbrake was located in cab 2. A pantograph hook stick was stowed in a tube mounted below the lower edge of the locomotive body on the roof access ladder side.

== Class 16E pairing ==
Class 16E electric locomotives were two-unit semi-permanently coupled Class 6E1 pairs coupled at their no. 1 ends. The aim was to accomplish savings on cab maintenance by abandoning the no. 1 end cabs in terms of maintenance and using only the no. 2 end cabs. During 1990 and 1991 Spoornet made up several such semi-permanently coupled pairs of otherwise unmodified Series 3 to Series 9 Class 6E1 locomotives, each pair getting reclassified to Class 16E, renumbered to a shared new unit number and with each unit inscribed as either the A or B unit.

This was unlike the procedure which was followed later with Class 17E locomotives which were internally modified and reclassified Class 6E1 Series 7, 8 and 9 locomotives, but which remained in service as individual locomotives and retained their original unit numbers after reclassification.

The original intent was to convert all the serving Class 6E and all eleven series of Class 6E1 to Class 16E locomotive pairs, with the following planned Class 16E number allocation:

- Class 6E: 16-001 to 16-010
- Class 6E1, series 1: 16-100 to 16-104, 16-109 and 16-110
- Class 6E1, series 2: 16-105 to 16-108
- Class 6E1, series 3: 16-207 to 16-237
- Class 6E1, series 4: 16-300 to 16-317
- Class 6E1, series 5: 16-318 to 16-335
- Class 6E1, series 6: 16-418 to 16-430
- Class 6E1, series 7: 16-400 to 16-417 and 16-431 to 16-437
- Class 6E1, series 8: 16-501 to 16-518
- Class 6E1, series 9: 16-500 and 16-521 to 16-536
- Class 6E1, series 10: 16-600 to 16-611
- Class 6E1, series 11: 16-700 to 16-711

The idea was not well thought through, however, and the law of unintended consequences soon manifested itself. In practice it was found that some locomotive pairs worked together better than others so that some pairings were successful while others gave problems. Maintenance issues presented further drawbacks since when only one unit in a Class 16E pair needed repairs, it meant that the partner was out of commission as well because their no. 1 end cabs were not kept serviceable. All these and other complications led to the programme being abandoned very quickly, long before all the Class 6E and 6E1 could be paired off.

A few of the successful and problem-free Class 16E pairings did continue to run that way for more than fifteen years with numbers 16-227A and B and 16-411A and B being the last to be separated. The rest were either separated during rebuilding to Class 18E or gradually converted back to dual cab Class 6E1s as soon as one or both in the pair required major maintenance, all of the latter reverting to their original Class 6E1 unit numbers. Their former Class 16E numbers were still visible on many of these locomotives years later.

None of the Class 6E or the Class 6E1, Series 1, 10 or 11 locomotives were ever paired into Class 16Es. Those which are known to have received this treatment are shown in Table 1.

Table 1: Known Class 16E locomotive pairs
| 16E no. | A Unit | B Unit | 6E1 Series | A Unit to 18E no. | B Unit to 18E no. |
|---|---|---|---|---|---|
| 16-100 | E1272 | E1273 | 2 | | |
| 16-227 | E1418 | E1419 | 3 | | 18-790 |
| 16-305 | | E1457 | 4 | | |
| 16-319 | | E1549 | 5 | | |
| 16-335 | E1607 | | 5 | | |
| 16-404 | E1846 | E1847 | 7 | 18-359 | 18-360 |
| 16-405 | E1848 | E1849 | 7 | 18-264 | 18-265 |
| 16-406 | | E1870 | 7 | | |
| 16-407 | | E1790 | 7 | | 18-184 |
| 16-409 | E1840 | E1841 | 7 | 18-338 | 18-339 |
| 16-410 | E1850 | E1851 | 7 | 18-392 | 18-393 |
| 16-411 | E1858 | E1859 | 7 | | |
| 16-420 | E1653 | | 6 | 18-799 | |
| 16-422 | E1669 | E1709 | 6 | 18-100 | 18-503 |
| 16-425 | E1699 | E1700 | 6 | 18-167 | 18-169 |
| 16-427 | E1684 | E1701 | 6 | 18-345 | 18-346 |
| 16-428 | E1718 | E1720 | 6 | 18-347 | 18-348 |
| 16-429 | E1679 | E1714 | 6 | 18-349 | 18-350 |
| 16-500 | E2001 | E2002 | 9 | 18-029 | 18-030 |
| 16-501 | E1916 | E1917 | 8 | 18-035 | 18-036 |
| 16-503 | E1914 | E1915 | 8 | 18-077 | 18-078 |
| 16-504 | E1925 | E1926 | 8 | 18-033 | 18-034 |
| 16-505 | E1918 | E1919 | 8 | 18-063 | 18-067 |
| 16-506 | E1928 | E1929 | 8 | 18-055 | 18-049 |

== Rebuilding to Class 18E ==
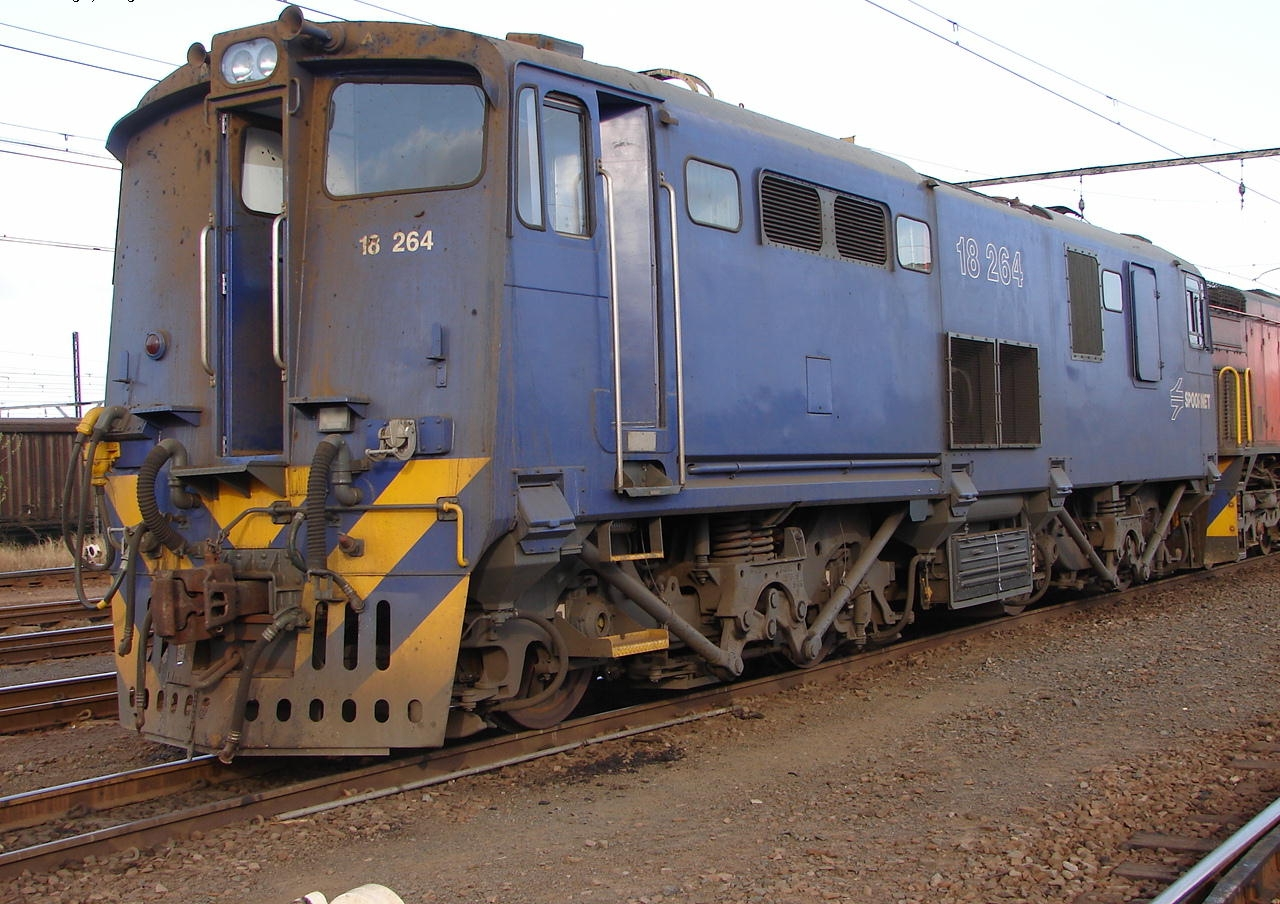
Cab 1 of Class 18E no. 18-264, ex Class 16E no. 16-405A, ex Class 6E1, Series 7 no. E1848, Bayhead Depot, Durban, 11 August 2007

Beginning in 2000, Spoornet embarked on a project to rebuild Series 2 to 11 Class 6E1 locomotives as well as Class 16E pairs which were originally from those series to Class 18E, Series 1 and Series 2 at the Transnet Rail Engineering workshops at Koedoespoort. In the process, the cab at the no. 1 end was stripped of all controls and the driver's front and side windows were blanked off to have a toilet installed, thereby forfeiting the locomotive's bi-directional ability.

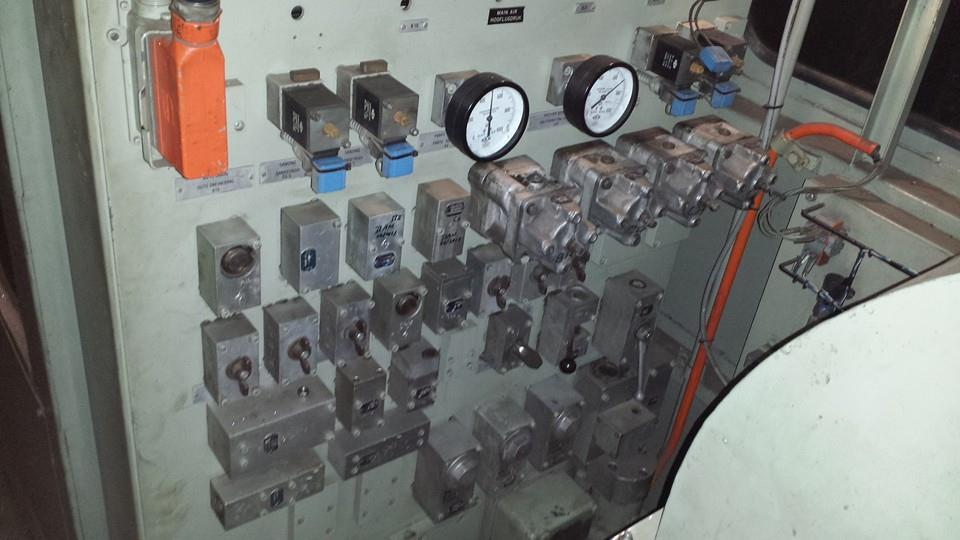
Brake rack in Class 18E no. 18-089

Since the driving cab's noise level had to be below 85 decibels, cab 2 was selected as the Class 18E driving cab primarily based on its lower noise level compared to cab 1 which was closer and more exposed to the compressor's noise and vibration. Another factor was the closer proximity of cab 2 to the low voltage switch panel. The fact that the handbrake was located in cab 2 was not a deciding factor, but was considered an additional benefit.

While the older Class 6E1, Series 2 to 7 locomotives had been built with a brake system consisting of various valves connected to each other with pipes and commonly referred to as a "bicycle frame" brake system, the Class 6E1, Series 8 to 11 locomotives were built with a compressed air equipment frame brake system, commonly referred to as a brake rack. Since the design of the rebuilt Class 18E locomotives included the same brake rack, the rebuilding project was begun with the newer series 8 to 11 locomotives to reduce the overall cost of rebuilding.

The known Class 16E locomotives which were used in this project were all rebuilt to Class 18E, Series 1 locomotives. Their numbers and renumbering details are shown in Table 2.

Table 2: Class 16E units rebuilt to Class 18E
| Count | 6E1 no. | 6E1 series | Year built | 18E no. | Year rebuilt | Notes |
|---|---|---|---|---|---|---|
| 1 | E1669 | 6 | 1976 | 18-100 | 2003 | ex 16-422A |
| 2 | E1679 | 6 | 1976 | 18-349 | 2007 | ex 16-429A |
| 3 | E1684 | 6 | 1976 | 18-345 | 2007 | ex 16-427A |
| 4 | E1699 | 6 | 1976-77 | 18-167 | 2004 | ex 16-425A |
| 5 | E1700 | 6 | 1976-77 | 18-169 | 2004 | ex 16-425B |
| 6 | E1701 | 6 | 1976-77 | 18-346 | 2007 | ex 16-427B |
| 7 | E1709 | 6 | 1976-77 | 18-503 | 2009 | ex 16-422B |
| 8 | E1714 | 6 | 1976-77 | 18-350 | 2007 | ex 16-429B |
| 9 | E1718 | 6 | 1977 | 18-347 | 2007 | ex 16-428A |
| 10 | E1720 | 6 | 1977 | 18-348 | 2007 | ex 16-428B |
| 11 | E1790 | 7 | 1977-78 | 18-184 | 2005 | ex 16-407B |
| 12 | E1840 | 7 | 1978 | 18-338 | 2007 | ex 16-409A |
| 13 | E1841 | 7 | 1978 | 18-339 | 2007 | ex 16-409B |
| 14 | E1846 | 7 | 1978 | 18-359 | 2007 | ex 16-404A |
| 15 | E1847 | 7 | 1978 | 18-360 | 2007 | ex 16-404B |
| 16 | E1848 | 7 | 1978 | 18-264 | 2006 | ex 16-405A |
| 17 | E1849 | 7 | 1978 | 18-265 | 2006 | ex 16-405B |
| 18 | E1850 | 7 | 1978 | 18-392 | 2008 | ex 16-410A |
| 19 | E1851 | 7 | 1978 | 18-393 | 2008 | ex 16-410B |
| 20 | E1914 | 8 | 1979 | 18-077 | 2003 | ex 16-503A |
| 21 | E1915 | 8 | 1979 | 18-078 | 2003 | ex 16-503B |
| 22 | E1916 | 8 | 1979-80 | 18-035 | 2002 | ex 16-501A |
| 23 | E1917 | 8 | 1979-80 | 18-036 | 2002 | ex 16-501B |
| 24 | E1918 | 8 | 1979-80 | 18-063 | 2002 | ex 16-505A |
| 25 | E1919 | 8 | 1979-80 | 18-067 | 2003 | ex 16-505B |
| 26 | E1925 | 8 | 1979-80 | 18-033 | 2002 | ex 16-504A |
| 27 | E1926 | 8 | 1979-80 | 18-034 | 2002 | ex 16-504B |
| 28 | E1928 | 8 | 1979-80 | 18-055 | 2002 | ex 16-506A |
| 29 | E1929 | 8 | 1979-80 | 18-049 | 2002 | ex 16-506B |
| 30 | E2001 | 9 | 1981 | 18-029 | 2002 | ex 16-500A |
| 31 | E2002 | 9 | 1981 | 18-030 | 2002 | ex 16-500B |

== Illustration ==
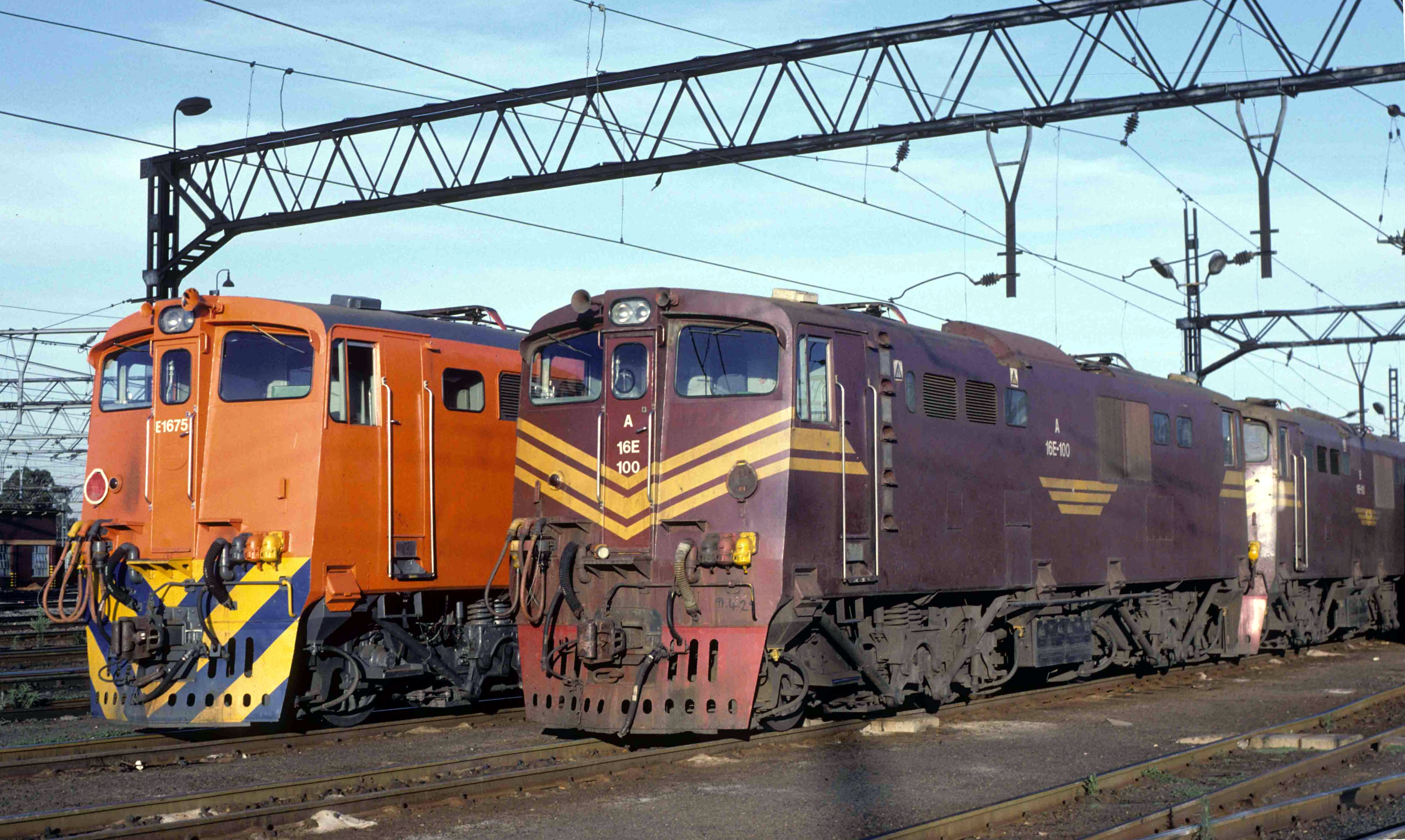
No. 16-100A & B (E1272 & E1273) in SAR Gulf Red and Whiskers livery, Germiston, 21 November 1991

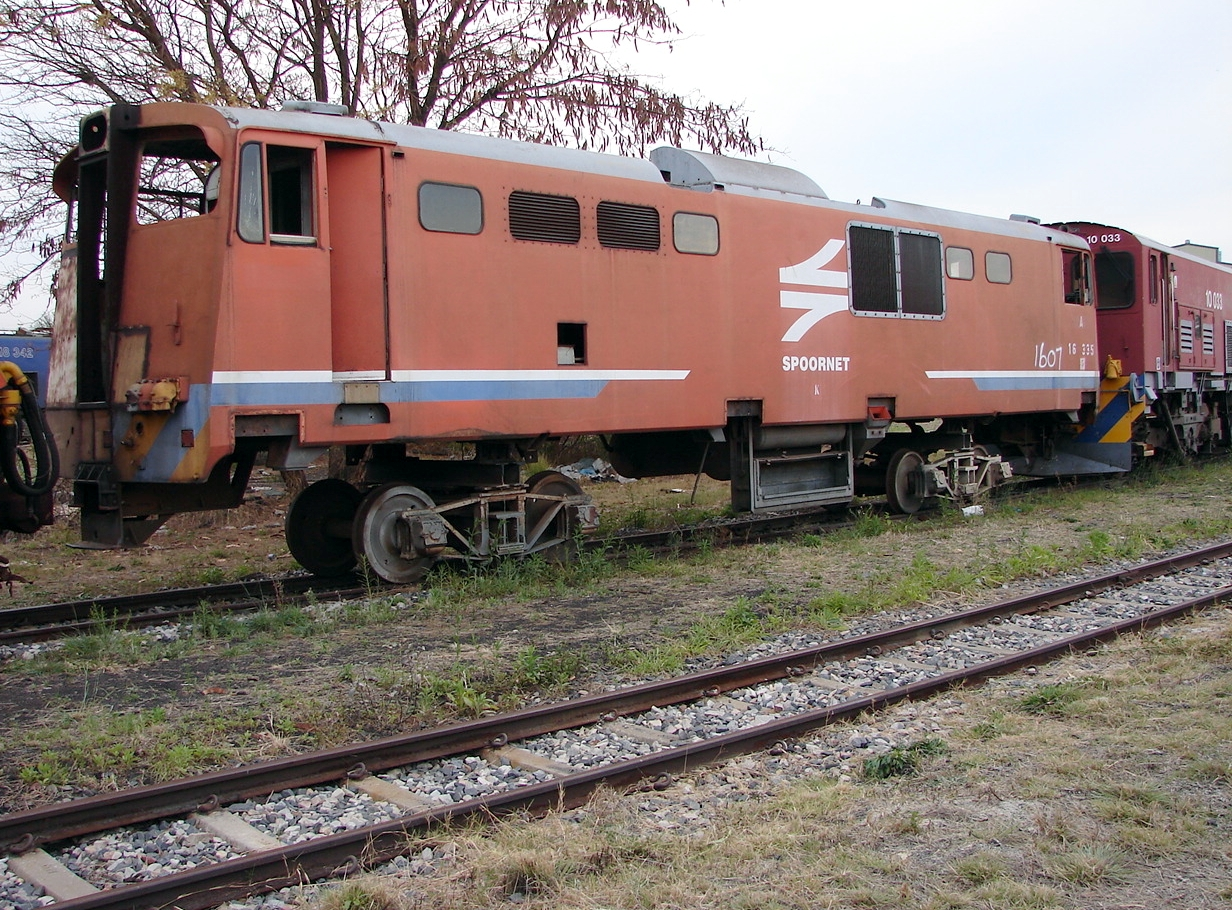
No. 16-335A (E1607) in Spoornet lined orange at Koedoespoort, 2 October 2009

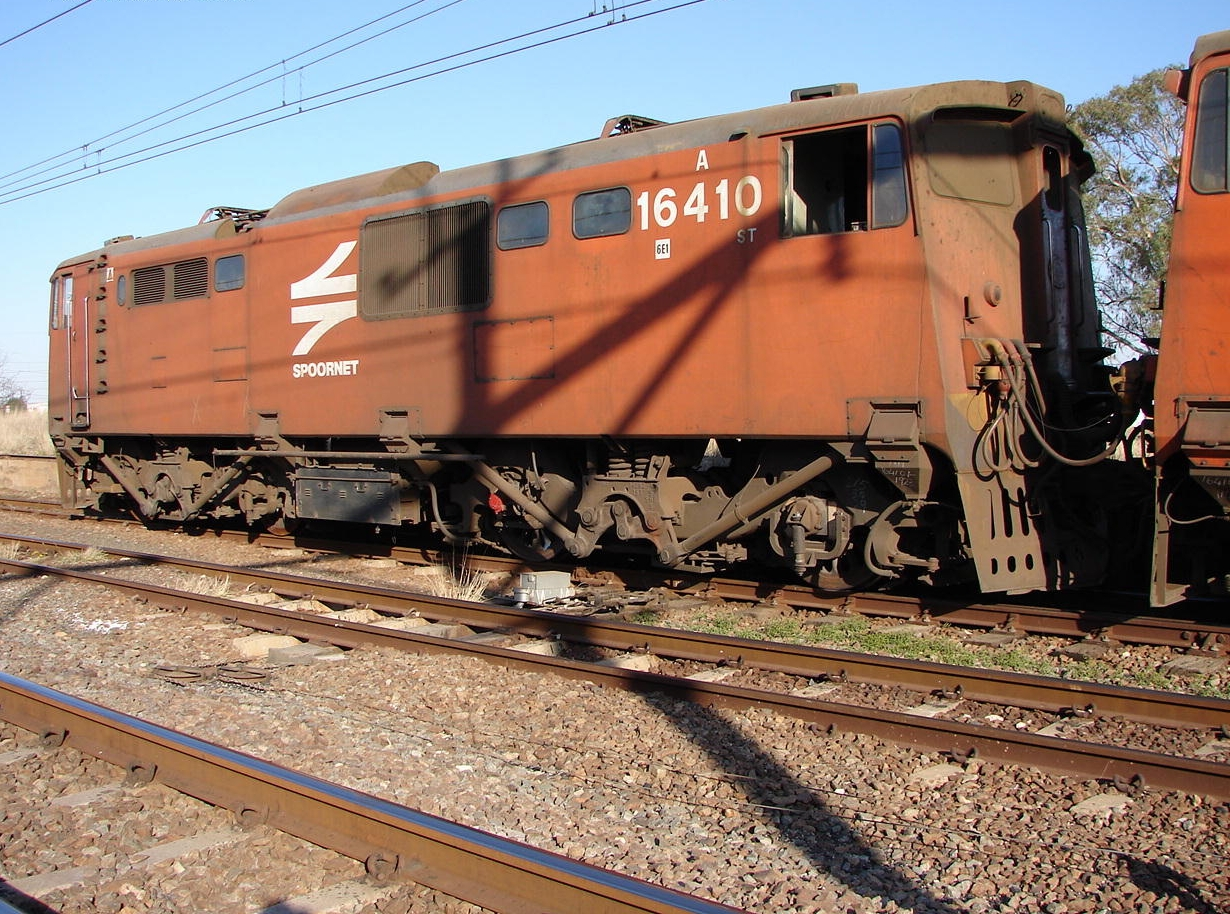
No. 16-410A (E1850) in Spoornet orange livery at Christiana, 22 September 2006

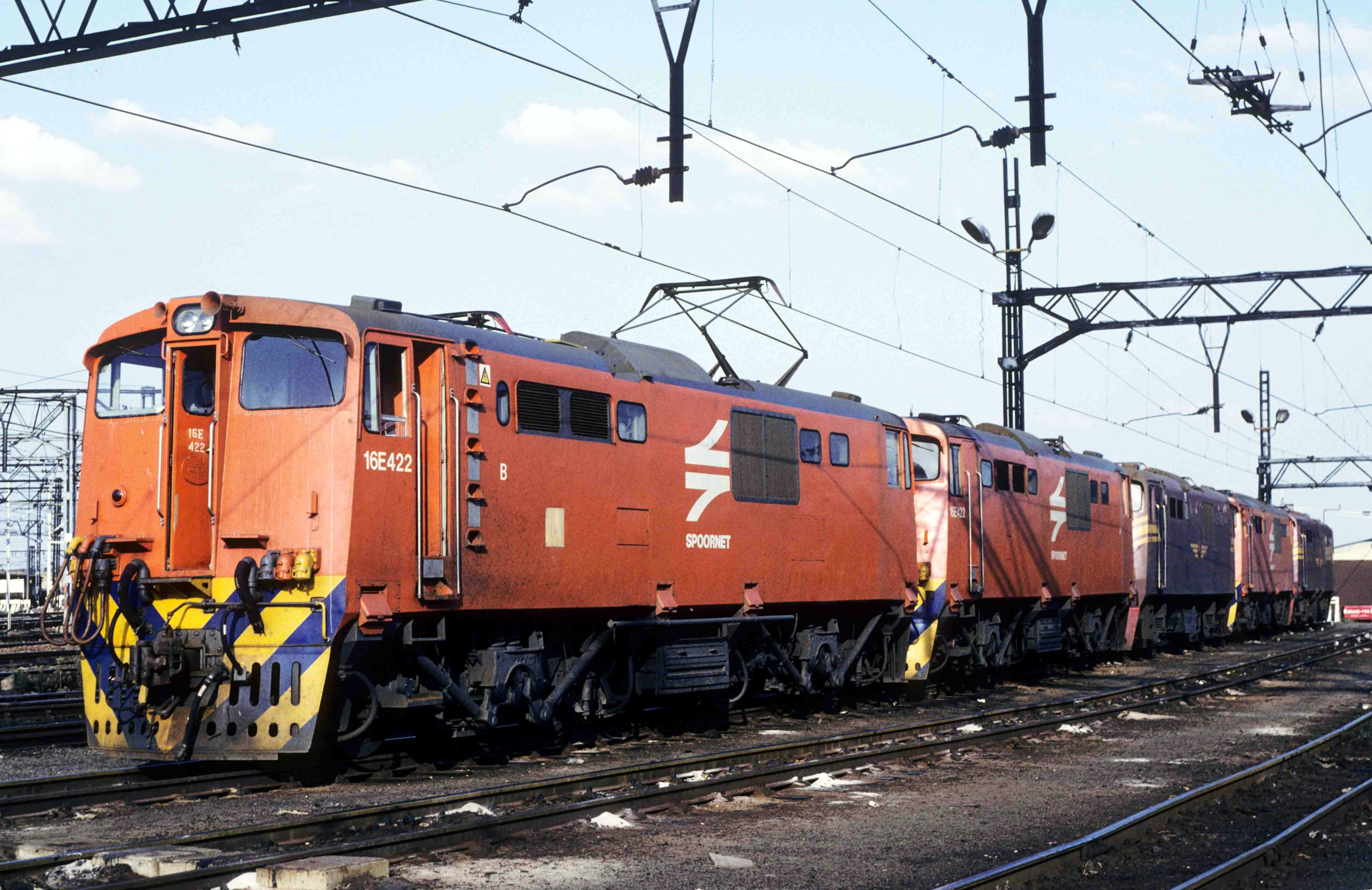
No. 16-422B & A (E1709 & E1669) in Spoornet orange livery, Germiston, 6 December 1991
