= South African Class 18E, Series 1 =

2000 design of electric locomotive

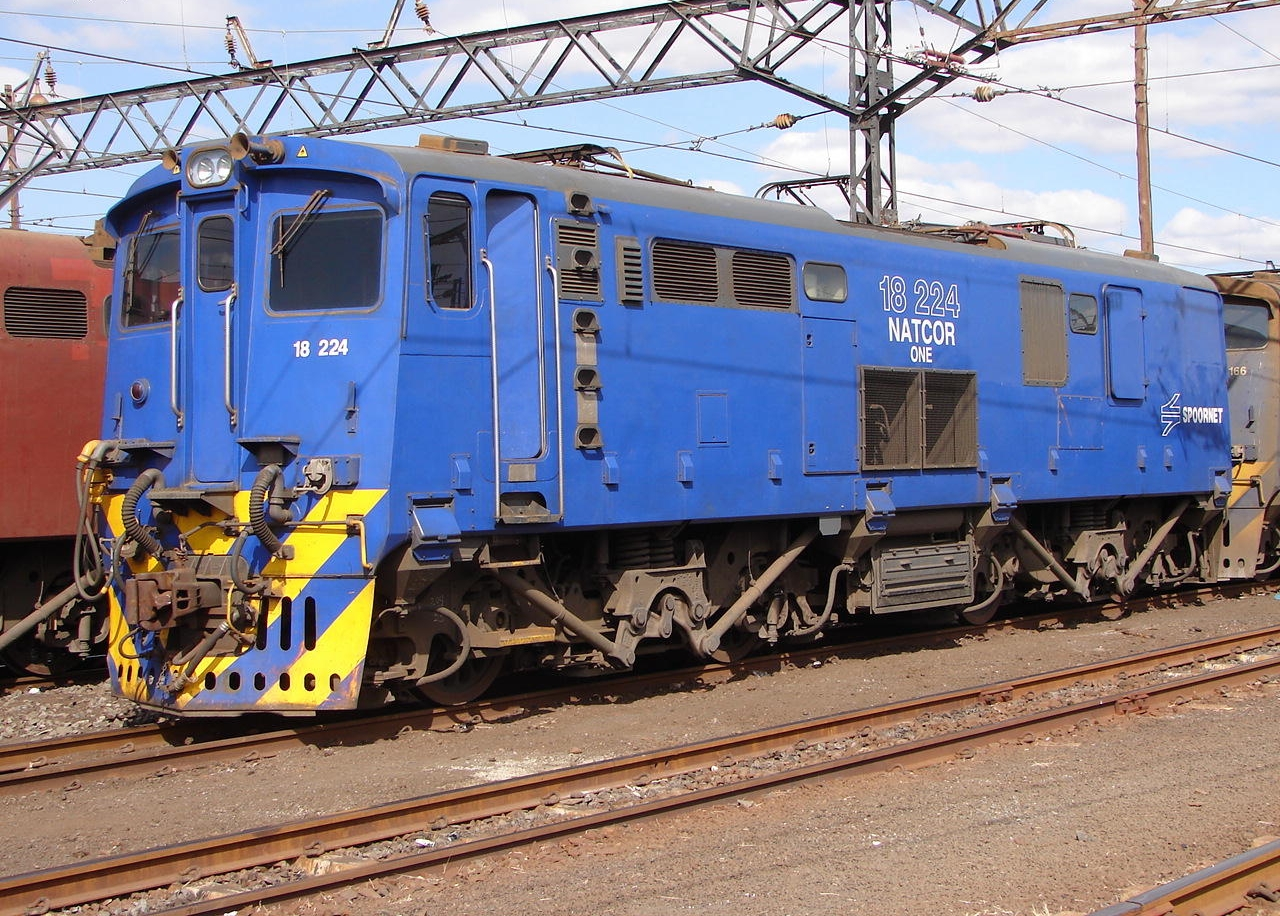
- No. 18-224, Ladysmith, KwaZulu-Natal, 5 August 2007
Type and origin
- Power type: Electric
- Designer: Union Carriage & Wagon
- Builder: Transwerk; Transnet Rail Engineering
- Model: Spoornet 18E
- Build date: 2000-2009
- Total produced: 446
Specifications
- Configuration
  - AAR: B-B
  - UIC: Bo'Bo'
  - Commonwealth: Bo-Bo
- Gauge: 3 ft 6 in (1,067 mm) Cape gauge
- Wheel diameter: 1,220 mm (48.0 in)
- Wheelbase: 11,279 mm (37 ft 0.1 in)
  - Bogie: 3,430 mm (11 ft 3.0 in)
- Pivot centres: 7,849 mm (25 ft 9.0 in)
- Panto shoes: 6,972 mm (22 ft 10.5 in)
- Length
  - Over couplers: 15,494 mm (50 ft 10.0 in)
  - Over body: 14,631 mm (48 ft 0 in)
- Width: 2,896 mm (9 ft 6.0 in)
- Height
  - Pantograph: 4,089 mm (13 ft 5.0 in)
  - Body height: 3,937 mm (12 ft 11.0 in)
- Loco weight: 88,904 kg (196,000 lb) max
- Electric system/s: 3 kV DC catenary
- Current pickup(s): Pantographs
- Loco brake: Air & Rheostatic
- Train brakes: Air & Vacuum
- Couplers: AAR knuckle
Career
- Operators: Spoornet; Transnet Freight Rail; PRASA
- Class: Class 18E
- Number in class: 446
- Numbers: 18-001 to 18-420; 18-500 to 18-525
- Delivered: 2000-2009
- First run: 2000

The Spoornet Class 18E, Series 1 of 2000 is a South African electric locomotive.

Beginning in 2000, Spoornet embarked on a program to rebuild Class 6E1 locomotives to Class 18E, Series 1 locomotives. Most of the Class 6E1s which had previously been reclassified or modified to Class 16E or Class 17E respectively were rebuilt to Class 18E as well.

== Manufacturer ==
The 3 kV DC Class 6E1 electric locomotive was built for the South African Railways (SAR) by Union Carriage & Wagon (UCW) in Nigel, Transvaal, with the electrical equipment supplied by the General Electric Company (GEC). Eleven series of Class 6E1 were delivered between 1969 and 1984, with altogether 960 units built. UCW did not allocate builder's numbers to the locomotives which it built for the SAR, but used the SAR unit numbers for their record keeping.

== Rebuilding ==
The rebuilding to Class 18E, Series 1 was done by Transwerk, later renamed Transnet Rail Engineering (TRE) and then Transnet Engineering (TE), at its Koedoespoort workshops in Pretoria. The rebuilding to Series 1 locomotives ceased in 2009, with 446 units rebuilt from Class 6E1, Series 6 to 11 locomotives, numbered in the ranges from 18-001 to 18-420 and 18-500 to 18-525.

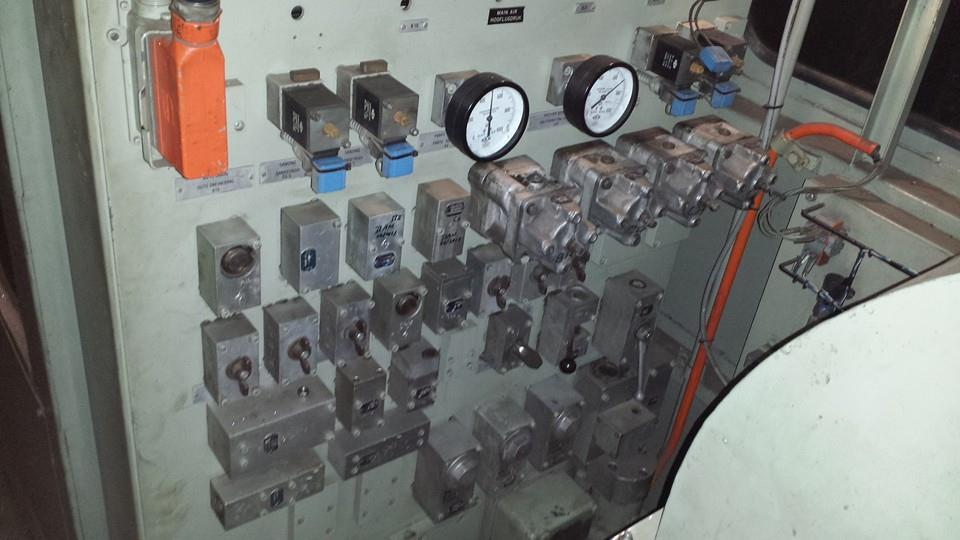
Brake rack in Class 18E no. 18-089

Since it was probably not intended at the beginning of the project to rebuild virtually the whole fleet of Class 6E1s to Class 18Es, most of the early rebuilds were done on the newest of the Class 6E1 fleet, Series 8 to 11. One of the reasons was that these series, numbers E1896 and up, already had an air equipment frame brake system, commonly referred to as a brake rack, similar to that intended for the Class 18E which would reduce the overall per-unit cost of rebuilding.

Another consideration was possibly that their bodywork usually required less heavy repairs than the older models in terms of rust and other damage, such as bent panels and frames.

Similar considerations possibly also applied when older Class 6E1s of Series 6 and 7 began to be rebuilt in 2003, since these units in the number range from E1646 to E1895, used the same brake valve as that of the Class 18E. The result by 2013, however, was a fleet of already ageing Class 18Es and ancient Class 6E1s, the latter mostly of Series 6 and older models.

=== Orientation ===
The Class 6E1 was a dual cab locomotive and had a roof access ladder on one side only, just to the right of the cab access door. The roof access ladder end was marked as the no. 2 end. A corridor along the centre of the locomotive connected the cabs, which are identical apart from the fact that the handbrake is located in cab 2.

The rebuilt Class 18E locomotive, on the other hand, is a single cab unit since cab 1 was stripped of all controls during the rebuilding to have additional equipment and a chemical toilet installed. Since the driving cab's noise level had to be below 85 decibels, cab 2 was selected as the Class 18E driving cab, primarily based on its lower noise level compared to cab 1, which is closer and more exposed to the compressor's noise and vibration. Another factor was the closer proximity of cab 2 to the low voltage switch panel. The fact that the handbrake was located in cab 2 was not a deciding factor, but was considered an additional benefit.

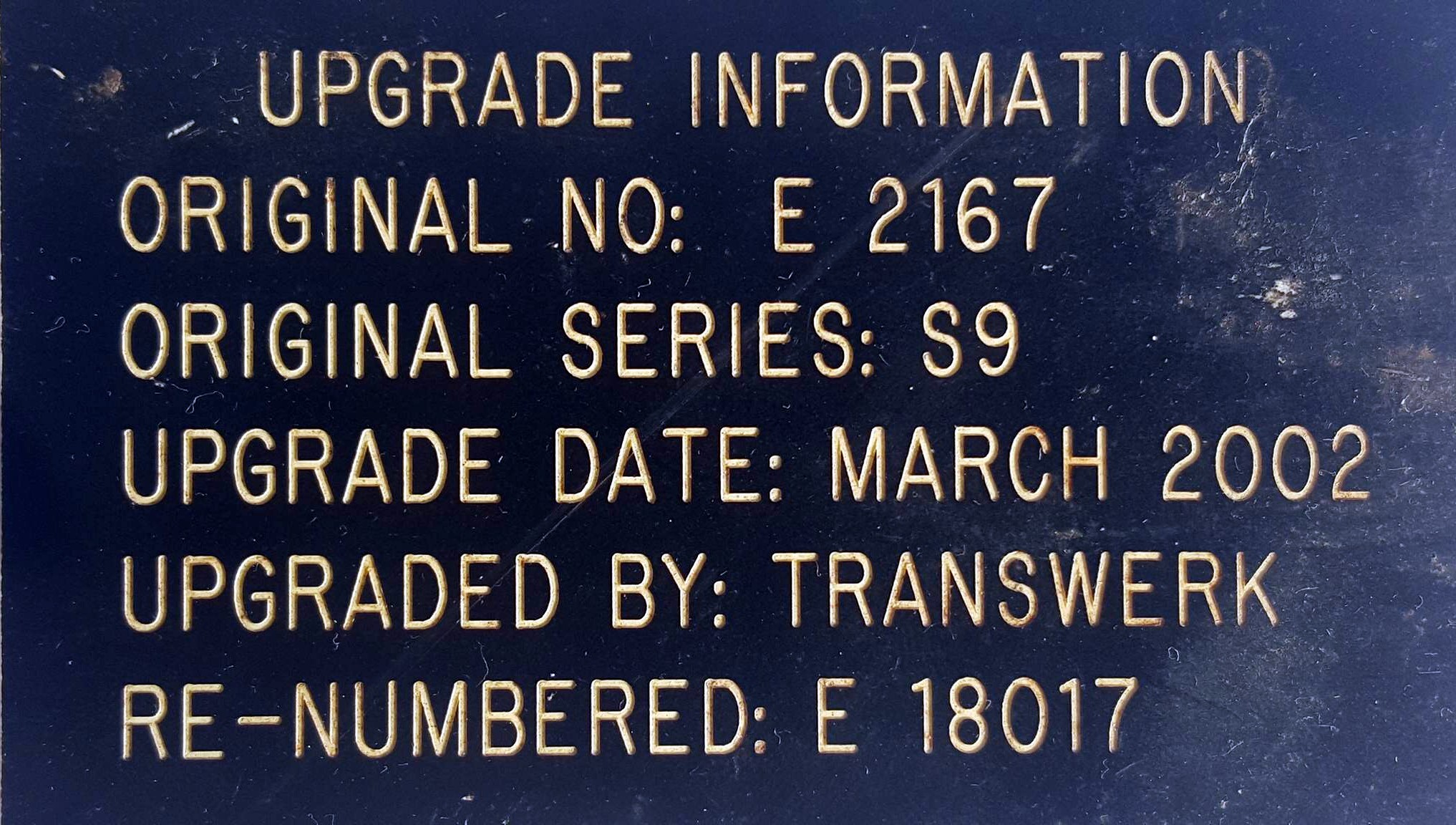
18-017 upgrade information plate

On some early rebuilds a small plate, about the size of a cigarette packet and engraved with the upgrade information was attached on the cab wall in Cab 1 next to the compressor ventilation opening. The specimen depicted is in error about the original Class 6E series, which was S11 in the case of no. E2167.

=== Brake systems ===
==== Air brakes ====
The Class 6E1 locomotives were built with an air brake system, consisting of various valves connected to each other with pipes, commonly referred to as a “bicycle frame” brake system. The compressed air pipe is run through bolster and other members and then in a zig-zag pattern under the locomotive's belly to extend its length, which allows the maximum amount of moisture to condense on the way to the reservoirs. As a result, it has multiple pipe connections. A weakness of the system was that, after an accident or even a hard coupling, these pipes tended to develop leaks at the joints which were extremely difficult to repair.

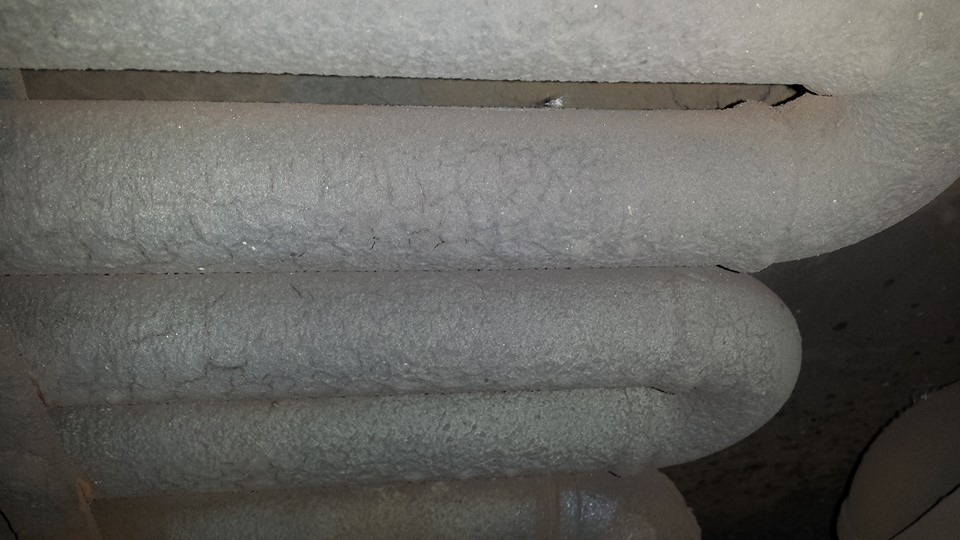
Compressed air pipes

When Class 6E1, Series 7 and earlier locomotives began to be rebuilt, it was necessary to retrofit them with a brake equipment frame or brake rack. Since this already increased the per-unit rebuilding cost, it was decided to simultaneously re-route the compressor pipe away from bolster and other members to the outside of the bodywork on the locomotive's right side, from below and to the right of the cab door to just before the second sandbox lid from the rear end. An added advantage was that the pipe would run cooler and more moisture would condense on the way to the reservoirs. The same modification was not done on locomotives which were rebuilt from Class 6E1, Series 8 and later.

==== Dynamic brakes ====
The Class 6E1 locomotives were equipped with regenerative brakes. With regenerative braking, the energy generated by the traction motors is dissipated by the resistor grid banks at the substations, when it is not absorbed by other locomotives in the same electrical section. A stumbling block was that the regeneration equipment at many of the sub-stations along the route was unreliable. Since there was no guarantee that another train would be in the same section to absorb the regenerated energy, there was always the risk that line voltage could exceed 4.1 kV, which would make either the sub-station or the locomotive trip out.

As a result, the rebuilt Class 18E locomotives were equipped with rheostatic braking instead of regenerative braking. With rheostatic braking, the energy generated by the traction motors is dissipated by the resistor grids on the locomotive itself. The rheostatic braking of the Class 18E was superior and very reliable for higher speed trains, compared with the regenerative braking of the older Classes 6E1 and 17E locomotives.

=== Bogies ===
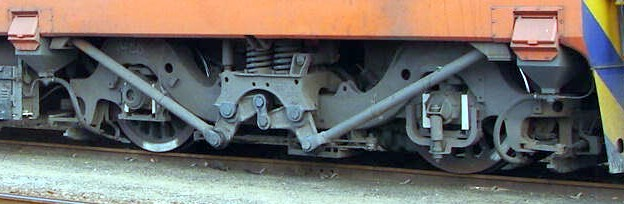
Class 6E1 Series 2 to 11 bogies

The Class 6E1 was built with sophisticated traction linkages on their bogies. Together with the locomotive's electronic wheel-slip detection system, these traction struts, mounted between the linkages on the bogies and the locomotive body and colloquially referred to as grasshopper legs, ensure the maximum transfer of power to the rails without causing wheel-slip by reducing the adhesion of the leading bogie and increasing that of the trailing bogie by as much as 15% upon starting.

During rebuilding, all bogies and traction motors underwent a complete refurbishment. Traction motors were tested back-to-back to ensure quality.

=== New equipment ===
The rebuilding included the installation of Alstom micro-processor control technology. New equipment in the totally refurbished Class 18E locomotive include the following:

- A transducer to relay vacuum and compressed air pressure to an electric signal.
- Dual-purpose main resistance modules which replaced the accelerating resistance system and which are used for motoring and rheostatic braking. The resistance blowers use AC motors which are powered through inverters.
- A DC current transformer (DCCT) which measures the current flowing to and from certain equipment, such as the traction motors or total overhead line current.
- A potential divider to measure the voltage in the overhead equipment and traction motors.
- A main processor unit (MPU) located in high tension compartment 1, used for primary (master) control of the locomotive.
- Remote input-output modules (RIOM) located in high tension compartment 2, in the low tension panel and the driving compartment, used for secondary (slave) control of the locomotive.
- Two digital display units (DDU) mounted on the driving console to display, for example information like speed, current draw and available overhead voltage, current draw of the traction motors in each bogie, rheostatic braking current generated per bogie, as well as performance information about all the locomotives in the consisted set.
- Overspeed protection which will automatically open the line switches if any pair of wheels slips and a speed of 95 kilometres per hour (59 miles per hour) is exceeded.
- The driver's cab and console received a lot of attention to ensure crew comfort and safety. It included the installation of an air conditioner and windows which offer better protection against rocks thrown by trackside vagrants.

=== Batteries ===
Beginning in 2009, in an attempt to reduce theft, the 110 V battery bank was relocated from the locomotive sides below the frame and between the bogies to cab 1, where the toilet occupied less than half of the available space. This appears to have been done only with numbers 18-510 and later. Identifying features are a small grille to the left of the bottom of the cab 1 side door and, in most cases, the remaining battery box frames without side covers.

== Appearance ==
=== Identifying features ===
The most obvious visual feature to distinguish the Class 18E from the Class 6E1 is the filled-in driver's windows at the rear end, where the toilet is installed. On the first rebuilds, as observed up to no. 18-012, the small driver's side window was left in place as a toilet window, but most of these have since also been filled in. The remaining rear windscreen still has the slanted upper edge of the 6E1 windscreens, but the new front windscreens on the Class 18E are rectangular.

On the sides, obvious visual distinctions from the Class 6E1 are the left one of the two large grilles which was removed, with the opening filled in, two new large grilles which are installed in the centre lower sides to serve as air intakes for the rheostatic braking resistance blowers, and a large access door to one of the high-tension compartments, which is installed in place of the rightmost small window which was in the upper side of the Class 6E1. On some Class 18E locomotives, one or more of the remaining small windows were slightly enlarged vertically. On the left side, the air intakes for the air conditioner in the cab are installed between the top three steps of the roof access ladder.

Locomotives which were rebuilt from Class 6E1, Series 6 and 7, have part of the compressed air piping sunk into a recess which runs along the rear of the lower edge of the body on the locomotive's right side, the side opposite the roof access ladder side. On locomotives which were rebuilt from Class 6E1, Series 8 to 11 this pipe was not rerouted.

=== Lineage identification ===
All features which distinguished Class 6E1, Series 6 to 11 locomotives from each other, are still present on the Class 18E rebuilds, making it possible to visually determine the Class 6E1 origin of most Class 18E locomotives. Examples are shown in the pictures below.

- The smooth sides of ex Series 6 and 7 locomotives and, on the Class 18Es rebuilt from them, the recessed compressed air pipe on the right side.
- The rainwater beading above the small grilles immediately to the right of the side door, which was only installed on Series 6 and later Class 6E1s.
- The large hatch door on each side, below the second small window to the right of the side door on the roof access ladder side, and below the first window immediately to the right of the door on the opposite side, on ex Series 8 to 11 locomotives.
- The rainwater downpipe drainage holes on the lower sides of ex Series 9 to 11 locomotives. As on the pre-rebuilt locomotives, these holes are usually covered by so-called buckets, but these covers are absent on several units.
- The end doors, which are flush with the doorframes on ex Series 6 to 8 locomotives, and recessed into the doorframes on ex Series 9 to 11 locomotives;
- The small side window on the driver's assistant's side, which was omitted on ex Series 9 to 11 locomotives;
- The squared corners on all doors on ex Series 6 to 8 locomotives, with a weather strip at the bottom, and the rounded corners and no weather strips on all doors on ex Series 9 to 11 locomotives;
- The side doors with:
  - mid-door mounted door handles on ex Series 6 and early Series 7 locomotives;
  - low-mounted handles with a drawer pull type handle at mid-door level on ex later Series 7 and Series 8 locomotives; and
  - two interconnected latch handles on the outside, one handle mounted near floor level and the other at mid-door level, on ex Class 6E1 Series 9 to 11 locomotives.

== Operation ==
The locomotive is controlled via resistors over which the voltage is dropped in a configuration of series and parallel electrical circuits. The circuit breakers which switch these circuits, work under very high power and voltage and are all pneumatically operated for insulation purposes. Compressed air is required to open or close the switch actions and air is also used for the weak field Cam Switch, which also switches under very high currents.

Upon starting and in the low notches, the major part of the voltage is dropped over the banks of resistors and all four traction motors are in series. As the driver notches up, some of the resistor banks are cut out via the pneumatically operated switches and the voltage increases across the traction motors. The more resistors which are cut out as the driver notches higher, the more power is developed by the traction motors. At around 22 to 28 kilometres per hour (14 to 17 miles per hour) the locomotive switches to a parallel combination, where the two traction motors per bogie are in a series electrical circuit, while the two bogies are in parallel electrical circuit. Eventually, when all resistors are cut out, the locomotive is operating in full-field.

The locomotives in a consisted set are switched between series and parallel mode automatically, based on speed, overhead voltage and electromotive force (EMF). The driver can select "series hold" to force some or all of the locomotives in the consisted set to remain in series mode when overhead voltage is low. If nothing is done, some of the locomotives will switch off under low overhead voltage conditions, to prevent damage to resistors, and switch on again when the voltage improves.

== Table of rebuilds ==
The table lists the original Class 6E1 number, series and year built for each Class 18E, Series 1 locomotive, as well as the year it was rebuilt to Class 18E. All the table columns are sortable.

Class 6E1 units rebuilt to Class 18E, Series 1
Count	6E1 no.	6E1 ser.	Year built	18E no.	Year rebuilt	Notes
1	E1954	8	1980	18-001	2000	
2	E1955	8	1980	18-002	2001	
3	E2150	11	1984	18-003	2001	
4	E2106	10	1983	18-004	2001	
5	E2144	11	1984	18-005	2001	
6	E1920	8	1979-80	18-006	2001	
7	E2166	11	1985	18-007	2001	
8	E2074	9	1982	18-008	2001	
9	E2004	9	1981-82	18-009	2001	
10	E1912	8	1979	18-010	2001	
11	E1942	8	1980	18-011	2001	
12	E1911	8	1979	18-012	2001	
13	E1978	8	1980	18-013	2001	
14	E1975	8	1980	18-014	2002	
15	E1961	8	1980	18-015	2002	
16	E2125	10	1983	18-016	2002	
17	E2167	11	1985	18-017	2002	
18	E1935	8	1980	18-018	2002	ex 17E
19	E1974	8	1980	18-019	2002	
20	E2072	9	1982	18-020	2002	
21	E1902	8	1979	18-021	2002	
22	E2010	9	1981-82	18-022	2002	
23	E2089	10	1983	18-023	2002	
24	E2119	10	1983	18-024	2002	
25	E1903	8	1979	18-025	2002	
26	E1980	8	1980	18-026	2002	
27	E1981	8	1980	18-027	2002	
28	E2055	9	1982	18-028	2002	ex 17E
29	E2001	9	1981	18-029	2002	ex 16-500A
30	E2002	9	1981	18-030	2002	ex 16-500B
31	E2157	11	1984	18-031	2002	
32	E2128	10	1984	18-032	2002	
33	E1925	8	1979-80	18-033	2002	ex 16-504A
34	E1926	8	1979-80	18-034	2002	ex 16-504B
35	E1916	8	1979-80	18-035	2002	ex 16-501A
36	E1917	8	1979-80	18-036	2002	ex 16-501B
37	E2037	9	1981-82	18-037	2002	ex 17E
38	E2165	11	1985	18-038	2002	
39	E2095	10	1983	18-039	2002	
40	E2131	10	1984	18-040	2002	Written off, rebuilt as 18-862
41	E1988	8	1981	18-041	2002	
42	E2009	9	1981-82	18-042	2002	
43	E2129	10	1984	18-043	2002	
44	E2102	10	1983	18-044	2002	
45	E2021	9	1981-82	18-045	2002	
46	E2087	10	1982	18-046	2002	
47	E2132	10	1984	18-047	2002	
48	E2180	11	1985	18-048	2002	
49	E1929	8	1979-80	18-049	2002	ex 16-506B
50	E2013	9	1981-82	18-050	2002	
51	E1963	8	1980	18-051	2002	
52	E2110	10	1983	18-052	2002	
53	E2099	10	1983	18-053	2002	
54	E2078	9	1982	18-054	2002	
55	E1928	8	1979-80	18-055	2002	ex 16-506A
56	E2061	9	1982	18-056	2002	
57	E2083	9	1982	18-057	2002	
58	E2014	9	1981-82	18-058	2002	
59	E2093	10	1983	18-059	2002	
60	E2112	10	1983	18-060	2002	
61	E1909	8	1979	18-061	2002	ex 17E
62	E1946	8	1980	18-062	2002	ex 17E
63	E1918	8	1979-80	18-063	2002	ex 16-505A
64	E1949	8	1980	18-064	2002	ex 17E
65	E1999	8	1981	18-065	2002	ex 17E
66	E2183	11	1985	18-066	2003	
67	E1919	8	1979-80	18-067	2003	ex 16-505B
68	E2149	11	1984	18-068	2002	
69	E1948	8	1980	18-069	2003	
70	E1962	8	1980	18-070	2003	ex 17E
71	E2162	11	1984	18-071	2003	
72	E1958	8	1980	18-072	2003	
73	E2075	9	1982	18-073	2003	ex 17E
74	E2038	9	1981-82	18-074	2003	ex 17E
75	E2153	11	1984	18-075	2003	
76	E2124	10	1983	18-076	2003	
77	E1914	8	1979	18-077	2003	ex 16-503A
78	E1915	8	1979	18-078	2003	ex 16-503B
79	E2056	9	1982	18-079	2003	ex 17E
80	E1885	7	1979	18-080	2003	
81	E2109	10	1983	18-081	2003	
82	E2126	10	1984	18-082	2003	
83	E2184	11	1985	18-083	2003	
84	E1940	8	1980	18-084	2003	ex 17E
85	E2122	10	1983	18-085	2003	
86	E1831	7	1978	18-086	2003	
87	E1904	8	1979	18-087	2003	ex 17E
88	E2138	10	1984	18-088	2003	
89	E2088	10	1982	18-089	2003	
90	E1871	7	1978-79	18-090	2003	
91	E2152	11	1984	18-091	2003	
92	E2154	11	1984	18-092	2003	
93	E2053	9	1982	18-093	2003	ex 17E
94	E1934	8	1980	18-094	2003	ex 17E
95	E2163	11	1984	18-095	2003	
96	E2118	10	1983	18-096	2003	
97	E1822	7	1977-78	18-097	2003	ex 17E
98	E2175	11	1985	18-098	2003	
99	E2116	10	1983	18-099	2003	
100	E1669	6	1976	18-100	2003	ex 16-422A
101	E2158	11	1984	18-101	2003	
102	E2105	10	1983	18-102	2003	
103	E2123	10	1983	18-103	2003	
104	E1686	6	1976	18-104	2003	
105	E2155	11	1984	18-105	2003	
106	E2174	11	1985	18-106	2003	
107	E1780	7	1977	18-107	2003	
108	E2114	10	1983	18-108	2004	
109	E2173	11	1985	18-109	2004	
110	E2170	11	1985	18-110	2004	
111	E2142	11	1984	18-111	2004	
112	E2164	11	1984	18-112	2004	
113	E2121	10	1983	18-113	2004	
114	E2135	10	1984	18-114	2004	
115	E2137	10	1984	18-115	2004	
116	E2146	11	1984	18-116	2004	
117	E2141	11	1984	18-117	2004	
118	E2182	11	1985	18-118	2004	
119	E2151	11	1984	18-119	2004	
120	E2176	11	1985	18-120	2004	
121	E2130	10	1984	18-121	2004	
122	E2120	10	1983	18-122	2004	
123	E2133	10	1984	18-123	2004	
124	E1687	6	1976	18-124	2004	
125	E2156	11	1984	18-125	2004	
126	E2094	10	1983	18-126	2004	
127	E2079	9	1982	18-127	2004	ex 17E
128	E2139	10	1984	18-128	2004	
129	E2172	11	1985	18-129	2004	
130	E2090	10	1983	18-130	2004	
131	E2127	10	1984	18-131	2004	
132	E2136	10	1984	18-132	2004	
133	E1854	7	1978	18-133	2004	
134	E1765	7	1977	18-134	2004	
135	E1842	7	1978	18-135	2004	
136	E2147	11	1984	18-136	2004	
137	E1782	7	1977	18-137	2004	
138	E1860	7	1978	18-138	2004	
139	E1769	7	1977	18-139	2004	
140	E2178	11	1985	18-140	2004	
141	E1747	7	1977	18-141	2004	
142	E1646	6	1976	18-142	2004	
143	E1693	6	1976	18-143	2004	
144	E1710	6	1976-77	18-144	2004	
145	E2148	11	1984	18-145	2004	
146	E2185	11	1985	18-146	2004	
147	E1673	6	1976	18-147	2004	
148	E2145	11	1984	18-148	2004	
149	E2100	10	1983	18-149	2004	
150	E2160	11	1984	18-150	2004	
151	E2113	10	1983	18-151	2004	
152	E2161	11	1984	18-152	2004	
153	E2140	10	1984	18-153	2004	
154	E2143	11	1984	18-154	2004	
155	E2117	10	1983	18-155	2004	
156	E1997	8	1981	18-156	2004	ex 17E
157	E2181	11	1985	18-157	2004	
158	E2086	10	1982	18-158	2004	
159	E1746	7	1977	18-159	2004	
160	E2104	10	1983	18-160	2005	
161	E1893	7	1979	18-161	2005	
162	E2159	11	1984	18-162	2005	
163	E1742	6	1977	18-163	2005	
164	E2092	10	1983	18-164	2005	
165	E1785	7	1977	18-165	2003	
166	E2101	10	1983	18-166	2003	
167	E1699	6	1976-77	18-167	2004	ex 16-425A
168	E2171	11	1985	18-168	2004	
169	E1700	6	1976-77	18-169	2004	ex 16-425B
170	E2179	11	1985	18-170	2005	
171	E2168	11	1985	18-171	2005	
172	E2177	11	1985	18-172	2005	
173	E2169	11	1985	18-173	2005	
174	E2096	10	1983	18-174	2004	
175	E2103	10	1983	18-175	2004	
176	E2091	10	1983	18-176	2004	
177	E2108	10	1983	18-177	2004	
178	E1966	8	1980	18-178	2005	ex 17E
179	E2098	10	1983	18-179	2005	
180	E2097	10	1983	18-180	2005	
181	E2080	9	1982	18-181	2005	
182	E1704	6	1976-77	18-182	2005	
183	E1876	7	1979	18-183	2005	
184	E1790	7	1977-78	18-184	2005	ex 16-407B
185	E1730	6	1977	18-185	2005	
186	E2107	10	1983	18-186	2005	
187	E1788	7	1977-78	18-187	2005	
188	E1796	7	1977-78	18-188	2005	
189	E1697	6	1976-77	18-189	2005	
190	E1656	6	1976	18-190	2005	
191	E2115	10	1983	18-191	2005	
192	E2065	9	1982	18-192	2005	ex 17E
193	E2025	9	1981-82	18-193	2005	ex 17E
194	E2020	9	1981-82	18-194	2005	ex 17E
195	E1899	8	1979	18-195	2005	
196	E2026	9	1981-82	18-196	2005	ex 17E
197	E1944	8	1980	18-197	2005	ex 17E
198	E1878	7	1979	18-198	2005	
199	E1959	8	1980	18-199	2005	
200	E1941	8	1980	18-200	2005	
201	E1969	8	1980	18-201	2005	ex 17E
202	E1931	8	1980	18-202	2005	ex 17E
203	E1939	8	1980	18-203	2005	ex 17E
204	E1972	8	1980	18-204	2005	
205	E1894	7	1979	18-205	2005	
206	E1750	7	1977	18-206	2005	
207	E1945	8	1980	18-207	2005	ex 17E
208	E1752	7	1977	18-208	2005	
209	E1652	6	1976	18-209	2005	
210	E2028	9	1981-82	18-210	2005	ex 17E
211	E2022	9	1981-82	18-211	2005	ex 17E
212	E2066	9	1982	18-212	2005	ex 17E
213	E1873	7	1979	18-213	2005	
214	E2085	9	1982	18-214	2005	ex 17E
215	E1986	8	1980-81	18-215	2005	ex 17E
216	E1937	8	1980	18-216	2005	ex 17E
217	E2084	9	1982	18-217	2005	ex 17E
218	E2052	9	1982	18-218	2005	ex 17E
219	E2044	9	1982	18-219	2005	ex 17E
220	E1960	8	1980	18-220	2005	
221	E1932	8	1980	18-221	2005	
222	E1968	8	1980	18-222	2005	ex 17E
223	E2030	9	1981-82	18-223	2005	ex 17E
224	E2070	9	1982	18-224	2005	ex 17E
225	E1991	8	1981	18-225	2005	ex 17E
226	E1984	8	1980-81	18-226	2005	ex 17E
227	E2042	9	1981-82	18-227	2005	ex 17E
228	E2076	9	1982	18-228	2005	ex 17E
229	E2051	9	1982	18-229	2005	ex 17E
230	E2039	9	1981-82	18-230	2005	ex 17E
231	E1797	7	1977-78	18-231	2005	
232	E2016	9	1981-82	18-232	2005	ex 17E
233	E1837	7	1978	18-233	2005	
234	E2043	9	1981-82	18-234	2005	ex 17E
235	E2082	9	1982	18-235	2005	ex 17E
236	E2007	9	1981-82	18-236	2005	ex 17E
237	E1998	8	1981	18-237	2006	ex 17E
238	E2045	9	1982	18-238	2005	ex 17E
239	E2050	9	1982	18-239	2006	ex 17E
240	E2057	9	1982	18-240	2005	ex 17E
241	E2040	9	1981-82	18-241	2006	ex 17E
242	E2063	9	1982	18-242	2006	ex 17E
243	E2073	9	1982	18-243	2006	ex 17E
244	E2077	9	1982	18-244	2006	ex 17E
245	E2067	9	1982	18-245	2006	ex 17E
246	E2033	9	1981-82	18-246	2006	ex 17E
247	E2036	9	1981-82	18-247	2006	ex 17E
248	E1943	8	1980	18-248	2006	
249	E2018	9	1981-82	18-249	2006	ex 17E
250	E2060	9	1982	18-250	2006	ex 17E
251	E2081	9	1982	18-251	2006	ex 17E
252	E2019	9	1981-82	18-252	2006	ex 17E
253	E2058	9	1982	18-253	2006	ex 17E
254	E2034	9	1981-82	18-254	2006	ex 17E
255	E2011	9	1981-82	18-255	2006	ex 17E
256	E1976	8	1980	18-256	2006	ex 17E
257	E2054	9	1982	18-257	2006	ex 17E
258	E2048	9	1982	18-258	2006	ex 17E
259	E2024	9	1981-82	18-259	2006	ex 17E
260	E1805	7	1977-78	18-260	2006	ex 17E
261	E2015	9	1981-82	18-261	2006	ex 17E
262	E1900	8	1979	18-262	2006	ex 17E
263	E1967	8	1980	18-263	2006	ex 17E
264	E1848	7	1978	18-264	2006	ex 16-405A
265	E1849	7	1978	18-265	2006	ex 16-405B
266	E1889	7	1979	18-266	2006	
267	E2023	9	1981-82	18-267	2006	ex 17E
268	E2047	9	1982	18-268	2006	ex 17E
269	E1971	8	1980	18-269	2006	ex 17E
270	E1843	7	1978	18-270	2006	ex 17E
271	E2046	9	1982	18-271	2006	ex 17E
272	E1982	8	1980	18-272	2006	ex 17E
273	E2012	9	1981-82	18-273	2006	ex 17E
274	E1936	8	1980	18-274	2006	ex 17E
275	E2008	9	1981-82	18-275	2006	ex 17E
276	E2041	9	1981-82	18-276	2006	ex 17E
277	E1647	6	1976	18-277	2006	
278	E1992	8	1981	18-278	2006	ex 17E
279	E1995	8	1981	18-279	2006	ex 17E
280	E1835	7	1978	18-280	2006	
281	E2064	9	1982	18-281	2006	ex 17E
282	E2062	9	1982	18-282	2006	ex 17E
283	E1827	7	1977-78	18-283	2006	ex 17E
284	E1906	8	1979	18-284	2006	ex 17E
285	E2003	9	1981-82	18-285	2006	ex 17E
286	E1923	8	1979-80	18-286	2006	
287	E1694	6	1976	18-287	2006	
288	E1908	8	1979	18-288	2006	ex 17E
289	E1777	7	1977	18-289	2006	ex 17E
290	E1947	8	1980	18-290	2006	ex 17E
291	E2069	9	1982	18-291	2006	ex 17E
292	E1775	7	1977	18-292	2006	ex 17E
293	E1938	8	1980	18-293	2006	ex 17E
294	E1810	7	1977-78	18-294	2006	ex 17E
295	E1910	8	1979	18-295	2006	ex 17E
296	E1983	8	1980	18-296	2006	ex 17E
297	E1690	6	1976	18-297	2006	
298	E1901	8	1979	18-298	2006	ex 17E
299	E2017	9	1981-82	18-299	2006	ex 17E
300	E1691	6	1976	18-300	2006	
301	E2032	9	1981-82	18-301	2006	ex 17E
302	E2068	9	1982	18-302	2006	ex 17E
303	E1989	8	1981	18-303	2006	ex 17E
304	E2031	9	1981-82	18-304	2006	ex 17E
305	E1994	8	1981	18-305	2006	ex 17E
306	E1922	8	1979-80	18-306	2007	ex 17E
307	E1832	7	1978	18-307	2007	ex 17E
308	E2005	9	1981-82	18-308	2007	ex 17E
309	E2000	8	1981	18-309	2007	ex 17E
310	E1990	8	1981	18-310	2007	ex 17E
311	E1905	8	1979	18-311	2007	ex 17E
312	E1985	8	1980-81	18-312	2007	ex 17E
313	E1696	6	1976	18-313	2007	
314	E1883	7	1979	18-314	2007	
315	E1996	8	1981	18-315	2007	ex 17E
316	E1965	8	1980	18-316	2007	ex 17E
317	E1838	7	1978	18-317	2007	
318	E1881	7	1979	18-318	2007	
319	E2027	9	1981-82	18-319	2007	ex 17E
320	E1933	8	1980	18-320	2007	ex 17E
321	E2059	9	1982	18-321	2007	ex 17E
322	E1716	6	1977	18-322	2007	
323	E1685	6	1976	18-323	2007	
324	E1987	8	1980-81	18-324	2007	ex 17E
325	E2006	9	1981-82	18-325	2007	ex 17E
326	E1776	7	1977	18-326	2007	ex 17E
327	E2029	9	1981-82	18-327	2007	ex 17E
328	E2071	9	1982	18-328	2007	ex 17E
329	E1964	8	1980	18-329	2007	ex 17E
330	E1907	8	1979	18-330	2007	ex 17E
331	E1801	7	1977-78	18-331	2007	ex 17E
332	E1749	7	1977	18-332	2007	ex 17E
333	E1792	7	1977-78	18-333	2007	
334	E1924	8	1979-80	18-334	2007	ex 17E
335	E1770	7	1977	18-335	2007	
336	E1993	8	1981	18-336	2007	ex 17E
337	E1979	8	1980	18-337	2007	ex 17E
338	E1840	7	1978	18-338	2007	ex 16-409A
339	E1841	7	1978	18-339	2007	ex 16-409B
340	E1913	8	1979	18-340	2007	ex 17E
341	E1921	8	1979-80	18-341	2007	ex 17E
342	E1861	7	1978	18-342	2007	
343	E1814	7	1977-78	18-343	2007	
344	E1826	7	1977-78	18-344	2007	ex 17E
345	E1684	6	1976	18-345	2007	ex 16-427A
346	E1701	6	1976-77	18-346	2007	ex 16-427B
347	E1718	6	1977	18-347	2007	ex 16-428A
348	E1720	6	1977	18-348	2007	ex 16-428B
349	E1679	6	1976	18-349	2007	ex 16-429A
350	E1714	6	1976-77	18-350	2007	ex 16-429B
351	E1683	6	1976	18-351	2007	
352	E1732	6	1977	18-352	2007	
353	E1895	7	1979	18-353	2007	
354	E1787	7	1977	18-354	2008	
355	E1722	6	1977	18-355	2007	
356	E1875	7	1979	18-356	2007	
357	E1721	6	1977	18-357	2007	
358	E1795	7	1977-78	18-358	2007	
359	E1846	7	1978	18-359	2007	ex 16-404A
360	E1847	7	1978	18-360	2007	ex 16-404B
361	E1789	7	1977-78	18-361	2007	
362	E1886	7	1979	18-362	2007	
363	E1863	7	1978-79	18-363	2007	
364	E1864	7	1978-79	18-364	2007	
365	E1833	7	1978	18-365	2007	
366	E1748	7	1977	18-366	2007	
367	E1743	6	1977	18-367	2007	
368	E1853	7	1978	18-368	2007	
369	E1817	7	1977-78	18-369	2007	
370	E1888	7	1979	18-370	2007	
371	E1892	7	1979	18-371	2007	
372	E1698	6	1976-77	18-372	2008	
373	E1665	6	1976	18-373	2008	
374	E1879	7	1979	18-374	2007	
375	E1692	6	1976	18-375	2008	
376	E1973	8	1980	18-376	2007	
377	E1764	7	1977	18-377	2008	
378	E1970	8	1980	18-378	2008	
379	E1799	7	1977-78	18-379	2008	
380	E1675	6	1976	18-380	2008	
381	E1655	6	1976	18-381	2008	
382	E1772	7	1977	18-382	2008	
383	E1897	8	1979	18-383	2008	
384	E1734	6	1977	18-384	2008	
385	E1774	7	1977	18-385	2008	
386	E1705	6	1976-77	18-386	2008	
387	E1830	7	1977-78	18-387	2008	
388	E1740	6	1977	18-388	2008	
389	E1760	7	1977	18-389	2008	
390	E1751	7	1977	18-390	2008	
391	E1759	7	1977	18-391	2008	
392	E1850	7	1978	18-392	2008	ex 16-410A
393	E1851	7	1978	18-393	2008	ex 16-410B
394	E1712	6	1976-77	18-394	2008	
395	E1649	6	1976	18-395	2008	
396	E1872	7	1979	18-396	2008	
397	E1724	6	1977	18-397	2008	
398	E1766	7	1977	18-398	2008	
399	E1753	7	1977	18-399	2008	
400	E1695	6	1976	18-400	2008	
401	E1815	7	1977-78	18-401	2008	PRASA
402	E1819	7	1977-78	18-402	2009	PRASA
403	E1804	7	1977-78	18-403	2008	PRASA
404	E1711	6	1976-77	18-404	2008	PRASA
405	E1738	6	1977	18-405	2008	PRASA
406	E1829	7	1977-78	18-406	2008	PRASA
407	E1758	7	1977	18-407	2009	
408	E1756	7	1977	18-408	2009	
409	E1821	7	1977-78	18-409	2009	PRASA
410	E1771	7	1977	18-410	2009	PRASA
411	E1689	6	1976	18-411	2009	
412	E1857	7	1978	18-412	2008	PRASA
413	E1828	7	1977-78	18-413	2008	PRASA
414	E1868	7	1978-79	18-414	2008	PRASA
415	E1957	8	1980	18-415	2009	PRASA
416	E1755	7	1977	18-416	2009	TFR, ex PRASA
417	E1786	7	1977	18-417	2009	
418	E1779	7	1977	18-418	2009	TFR, ex PRASA
419	E1952	8	1980	18-419	2009	PRASA
420	E1898	8	1979	18-420	2009	PRASA
421	E1798	7	1977-78	18-500	2009	
422	E1802	7	1977-78	18-501	2009	
423	E1808	7	1977-78	18-502	2009	
424	E1709	6	1976-77	18-503	2009	ex 16-422B
425	E1650	6	1976	18-504	2009	
426	E1836	7	1978	18-505	2009	
427	E1648	6	1976	18-506	2009	
428	E1927	8	1979-80	18-507	2009	
429	E1707	6	1976-77	18-508	2009	
430	E1874	7	1979	18-509	2009	
431	E1781	7	1977	18-510	2009	
432	E1856	7	1978	18-511	2009	
433	E1811	7	1977-78	18-512	2009	
434	E1880	7	1979	18-513	2009	
435	E1794	7	1977-78	18-514	2009	
436	E1891	7	1979	18-515	2009	
437	E1763	7	1977	18-516	2009	
438	E1725	6	1977	18-517	2009	
439	E1745	6	1977	18-518	2009	
440	E1731	6	1977	18-519	2009	
441	E1761	7	1977	18-520	2009	
442	E1757	7	1977	18-521	2009	
443	E1773	7	1977	18-522	2009	
444	E1865	7	1978-79	18-523	2009	
445	E1825	7	1977-78	18-524	2009	
446	E1706	6	1976-77	18-525	2009	

== Illustration ==
The Class 6E1 series lineage identification features, as well as the liveries which were applied to these locomotives, are illustrated in the following pictures. Note the external compressed air pipe on the right side of locomotives rebuilt from Class 6E1, Series 6 and 7.

Rebuilt from Class 6E1, Series 6

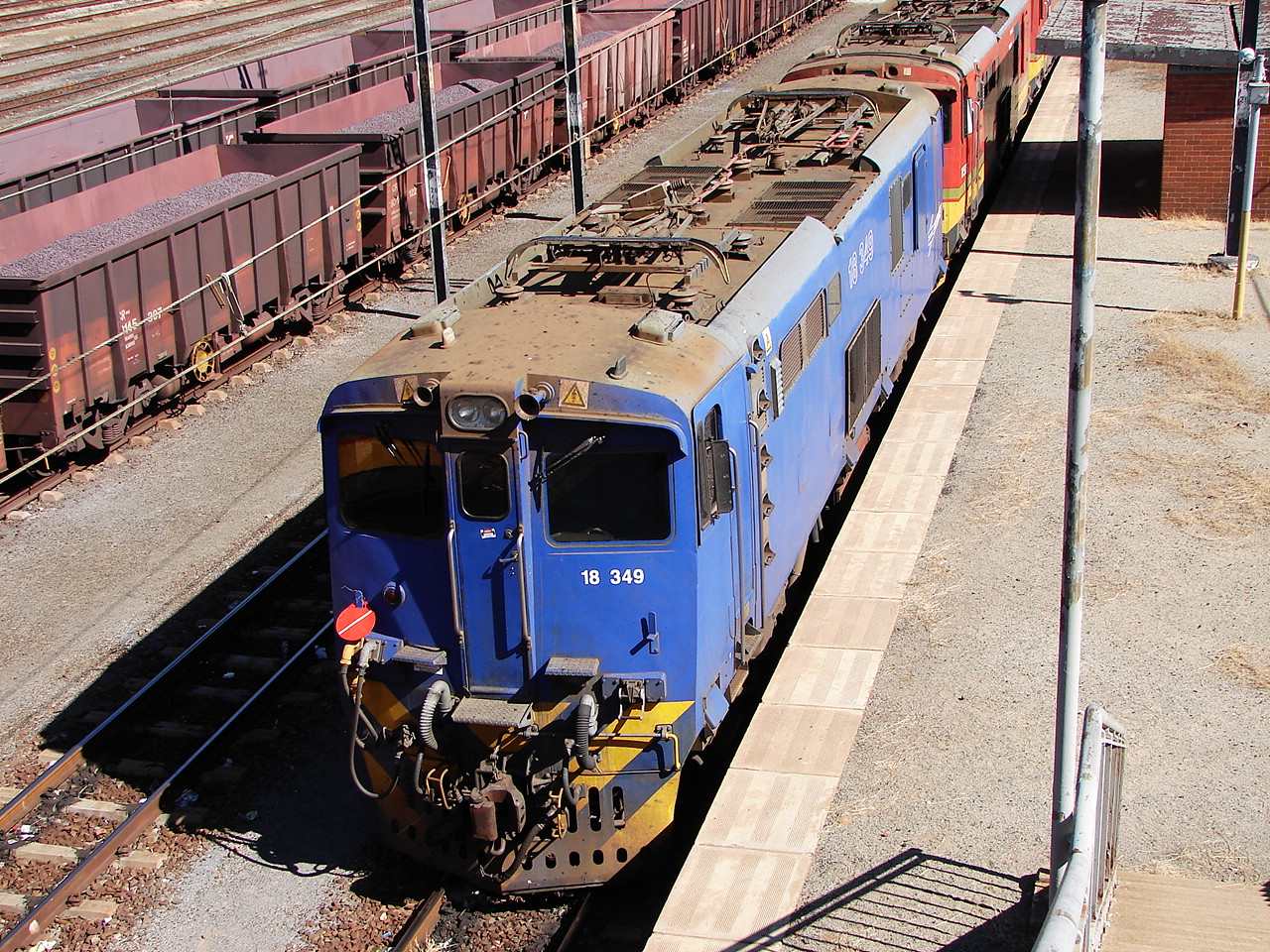
No. 18-349 (E1679) in Spoornet blue livery with outline numbers at Warrenton, 2 May 2013

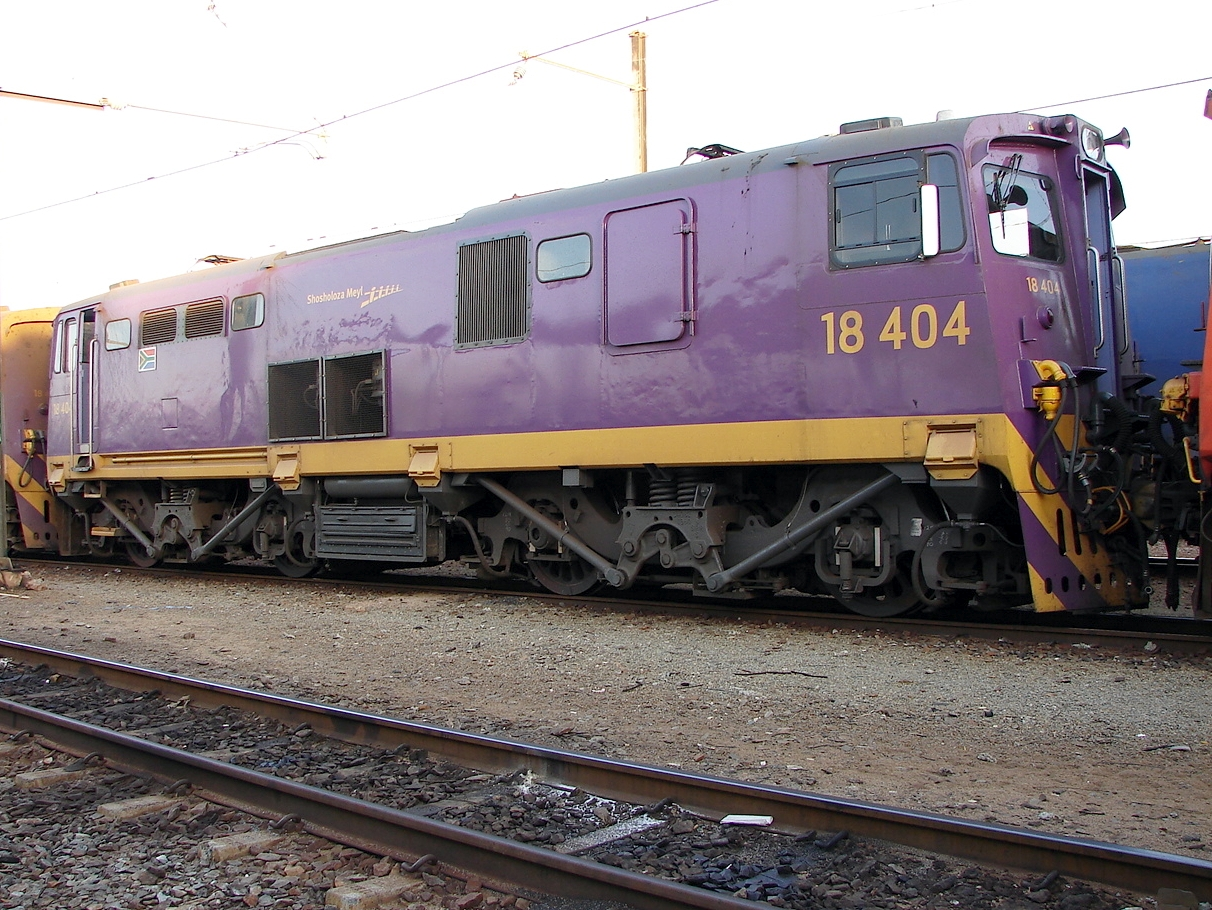
No. 18-404 (E1711) in PRASA's purple Shosholoza Meyl livery at Sentrarand, 8 October 2009

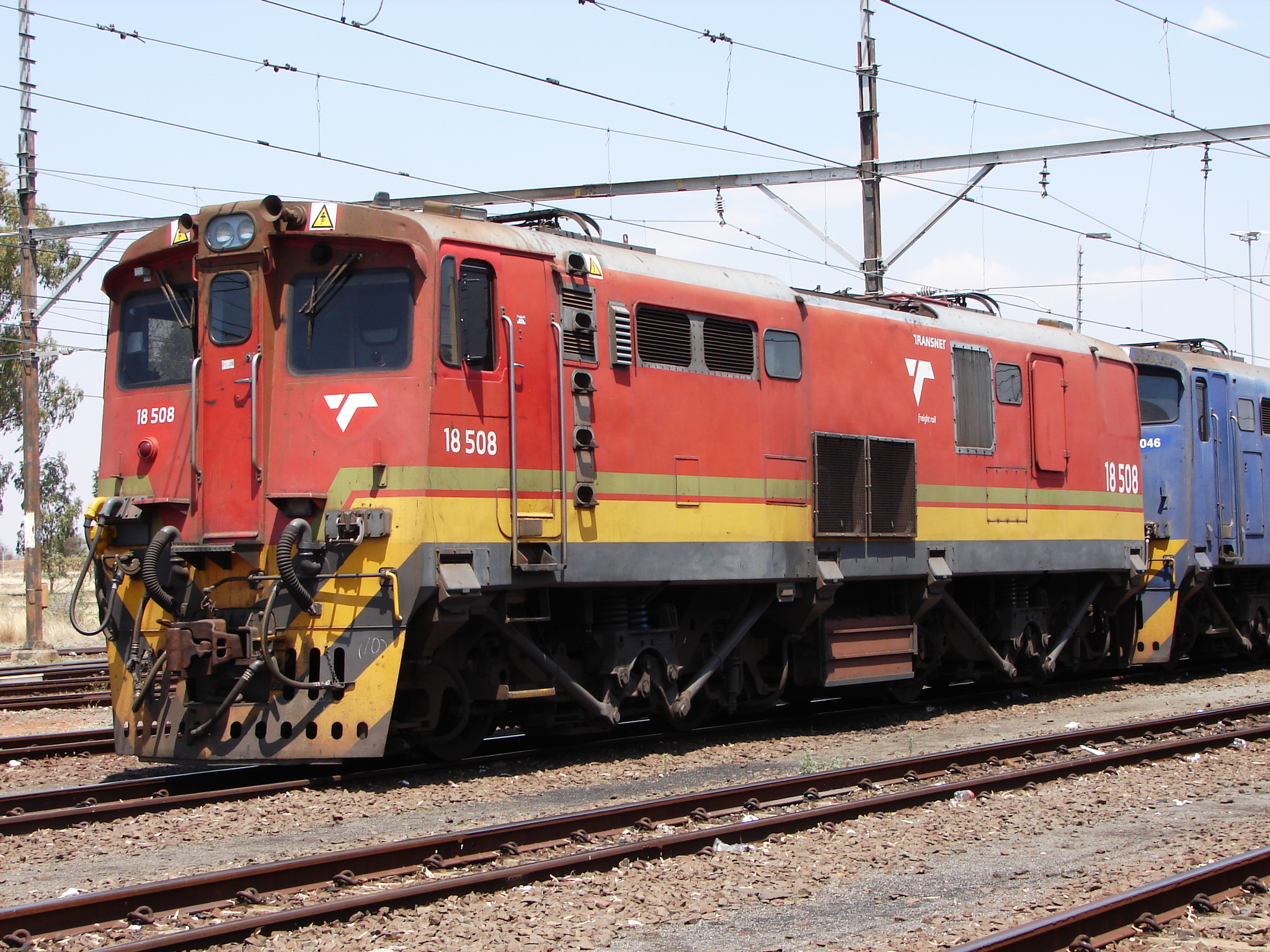
No. 18-508 (E1707) in Transnet Freight Rail livery at Warrenton, Northern Cape, 8 October 2015

Rebuilt from Class 6E1, Series 7

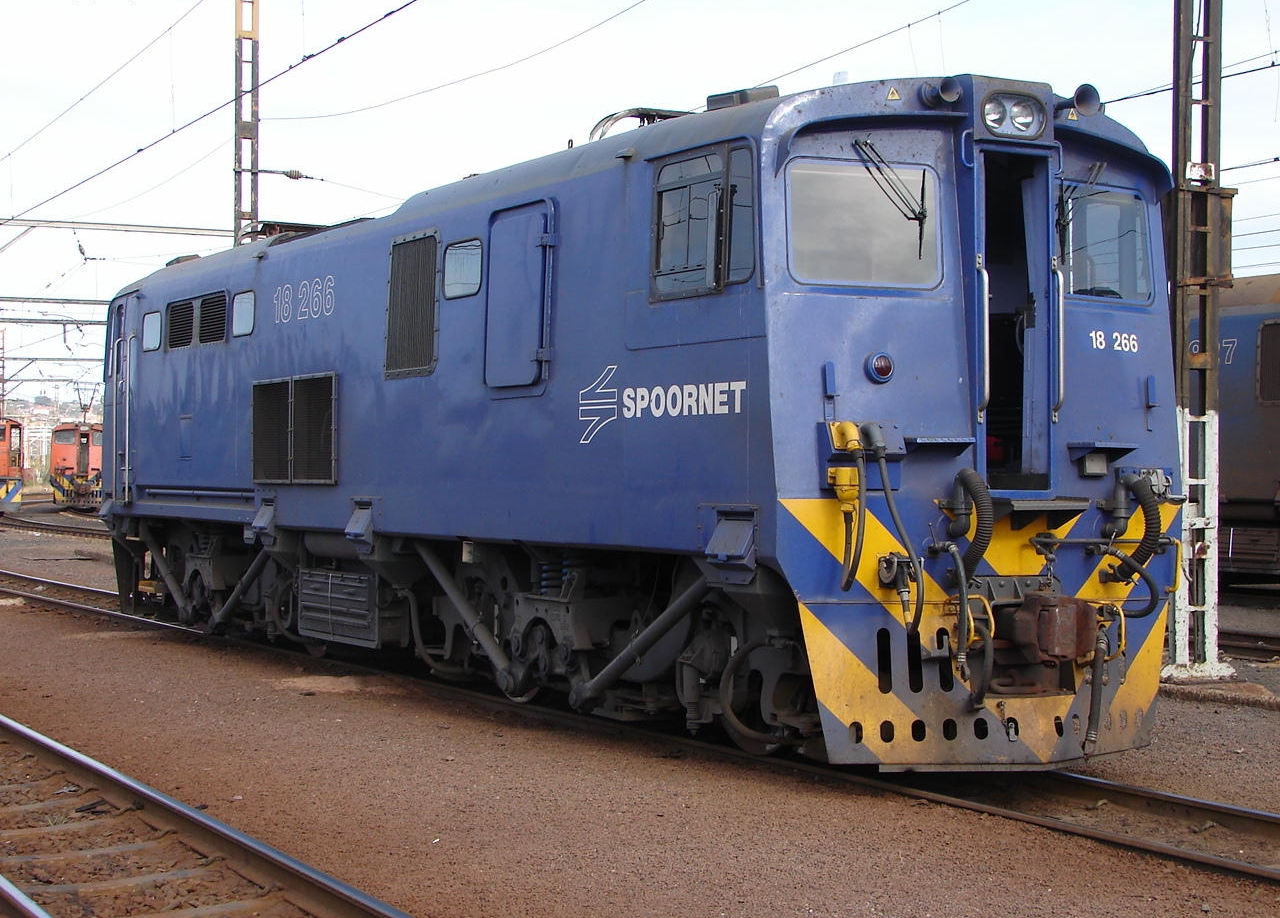
No. 18-266 (E1889) in Spoornet blue with outline numbers, Bayhead, Durban, 11 August 2007

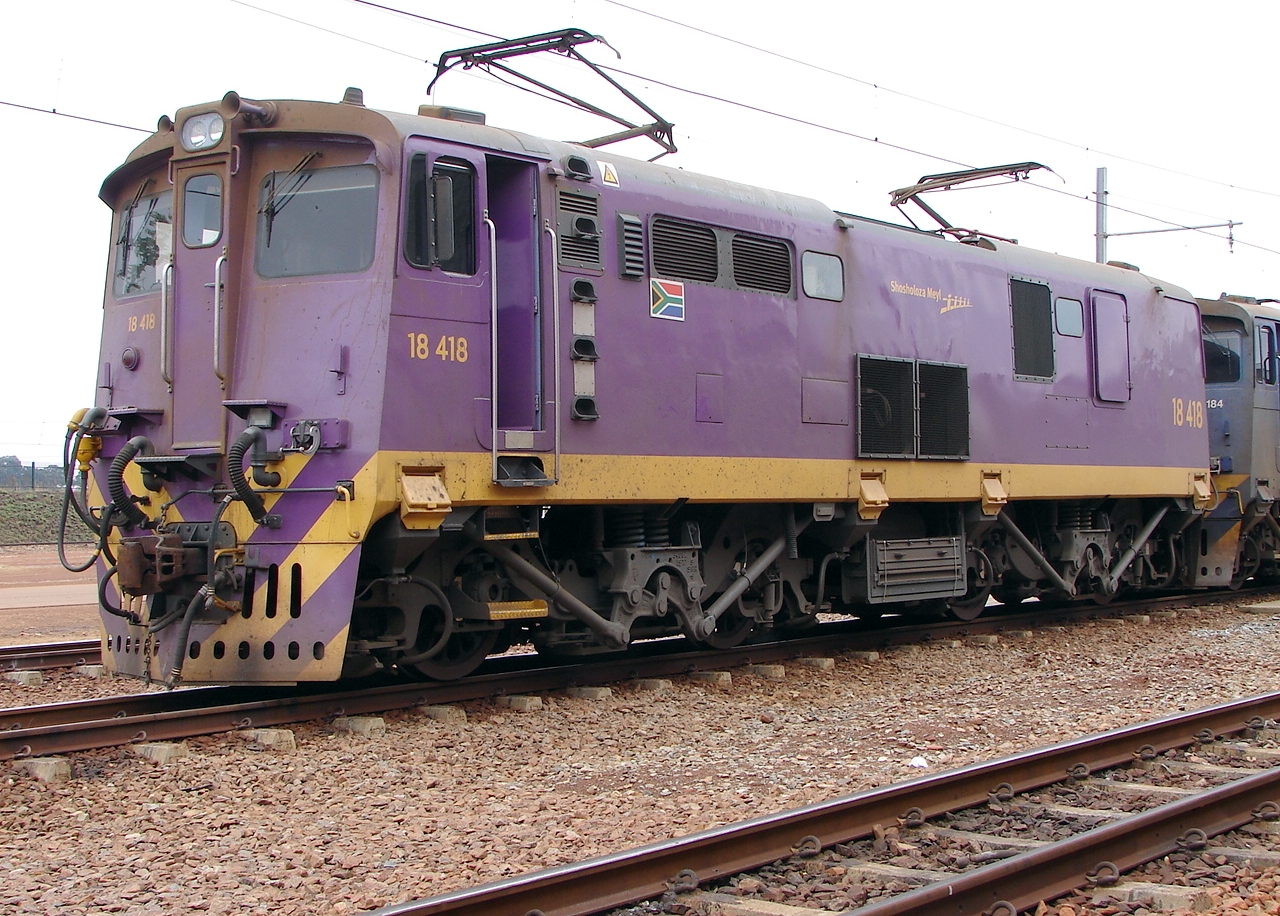
No. 18-418 (E1779) in PRASA's purple Shosholoza Meyl livery at Sentrarand, 29 September 2009

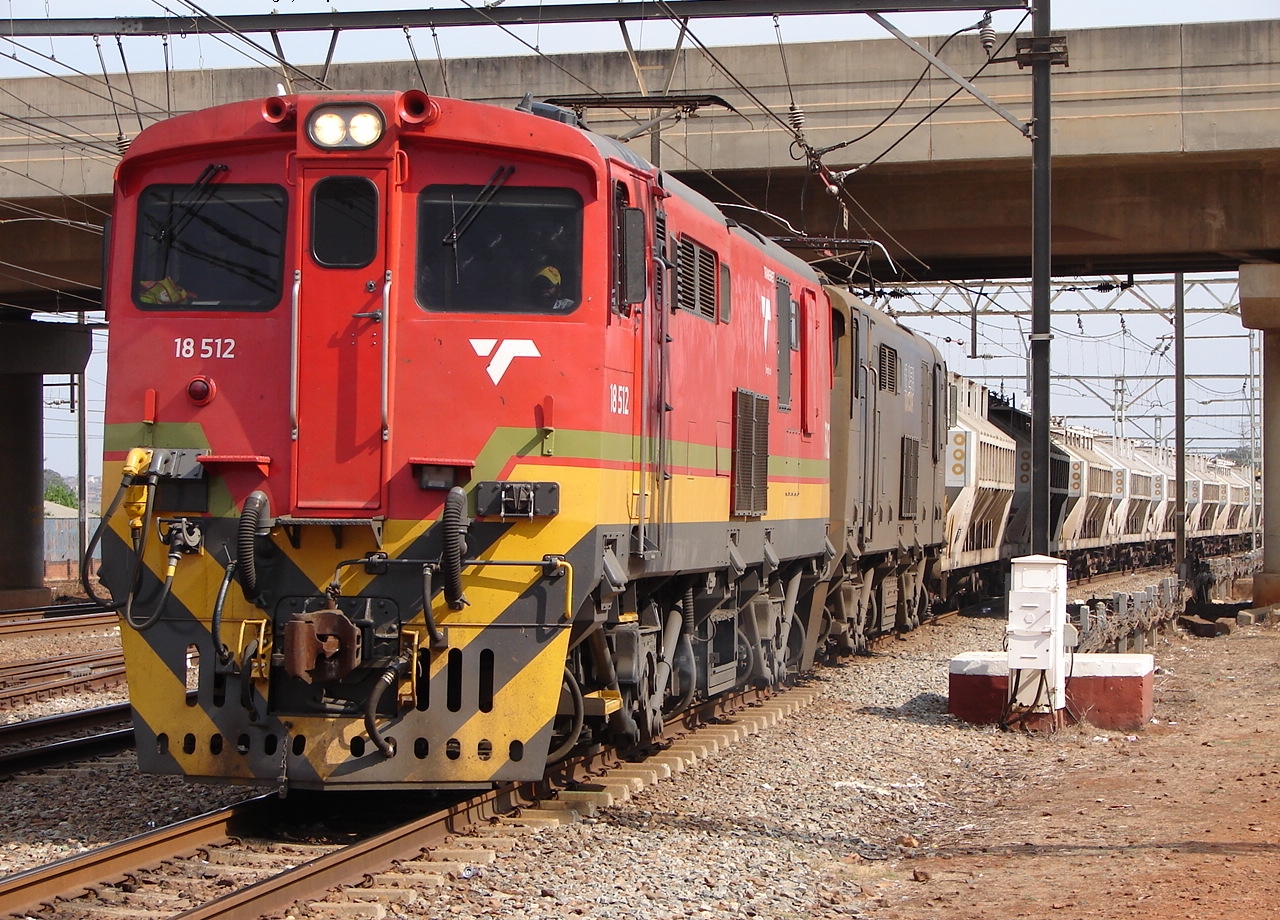
No. 18-512 (E1811) in Transnet Freight Rail livery at Kaalfontein, Gauteng, 28 September 2009

Rebuilt from Class 6E1, Series 8

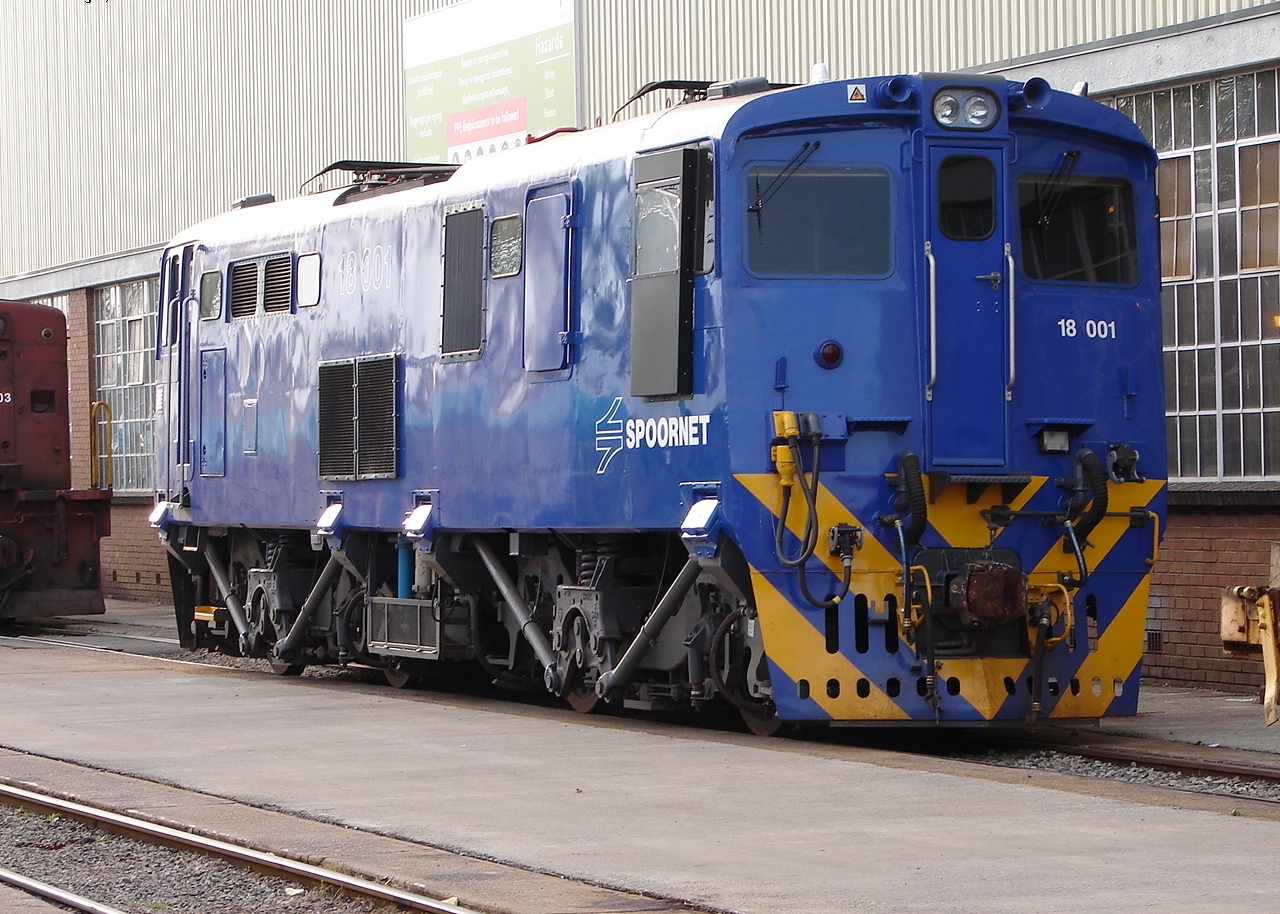
No. 18-001 (E1954) in Spoornet blue livery with outline numbers at Koedoespoort, 2 October 2009

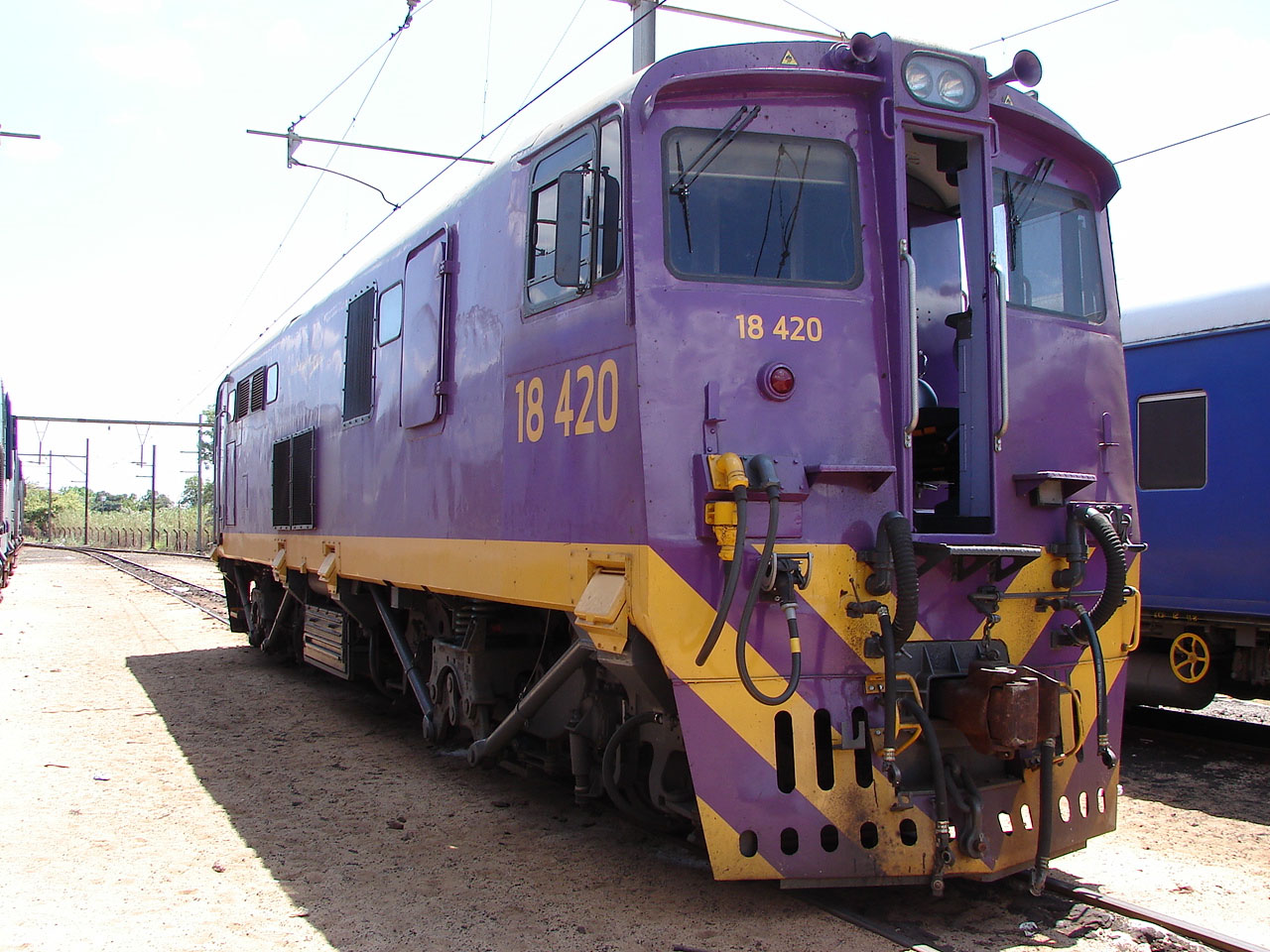
No. 18-420 (E1898) in PRASA's purple Shosholoza Meyl livery at Pyramid South, 6 October 2009

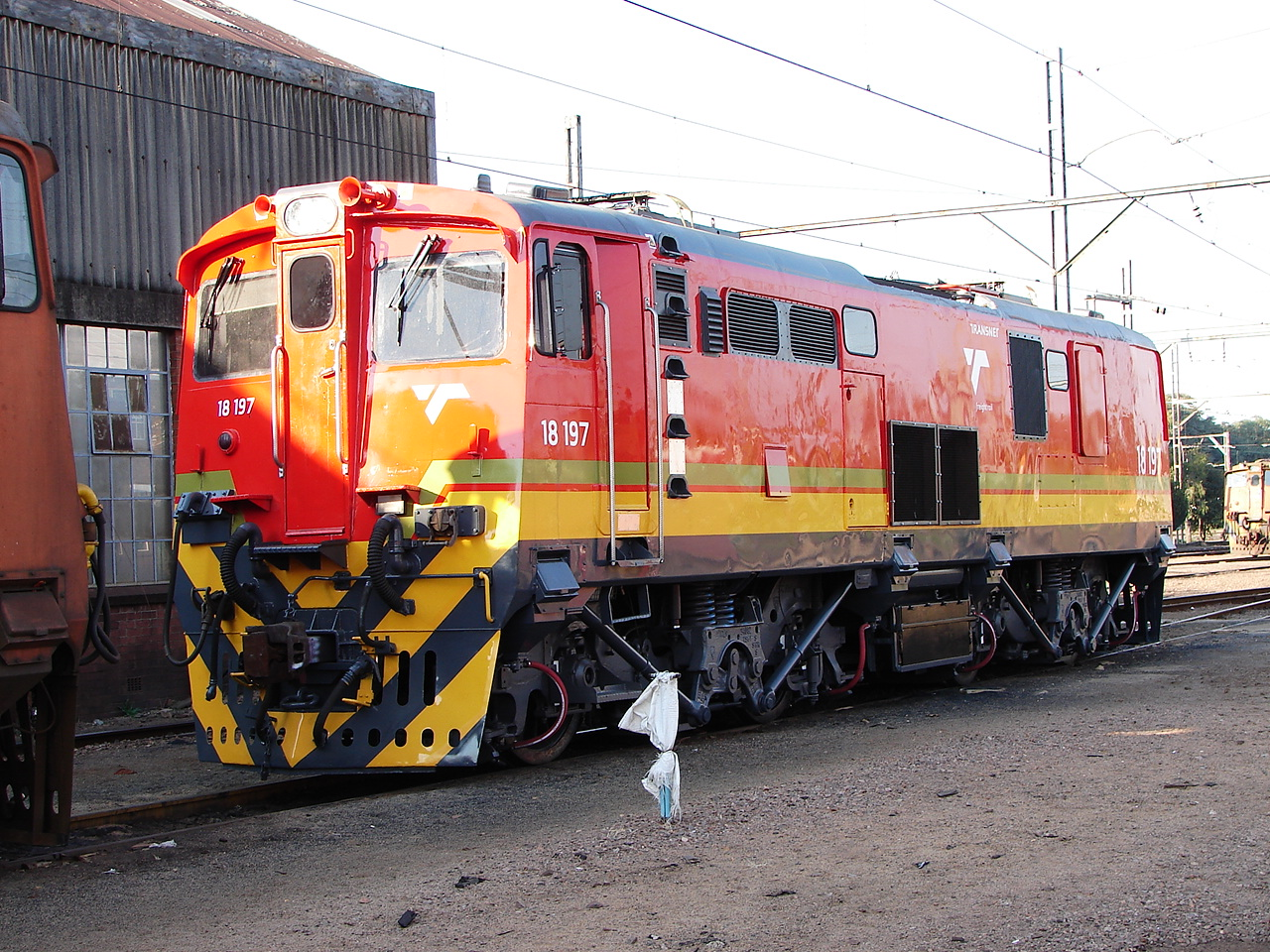
No. 18-197 (E1944) in Transnet Freight Rail livery at Capital Park, Pretoria, 9 October 2009

Rebuilt from Class 6E1, Series 9

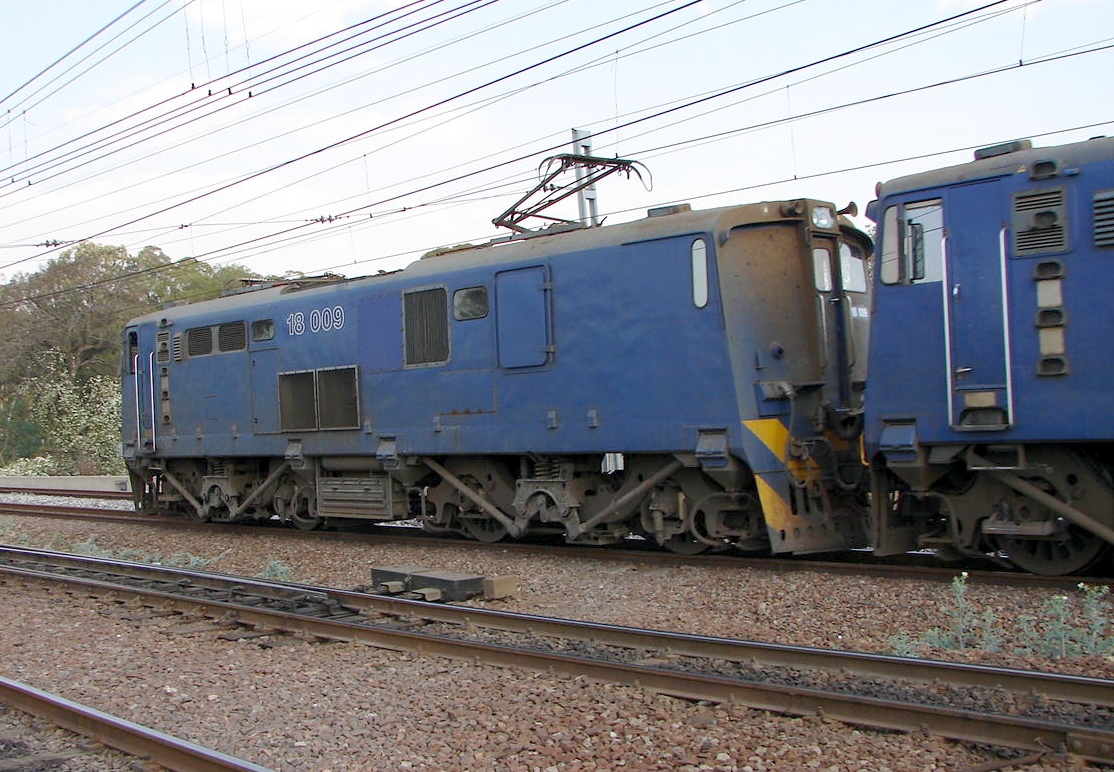
No. 18-009 (E2004) with a toilet side window, at Capital Park, Pretoria, 29 September 2006

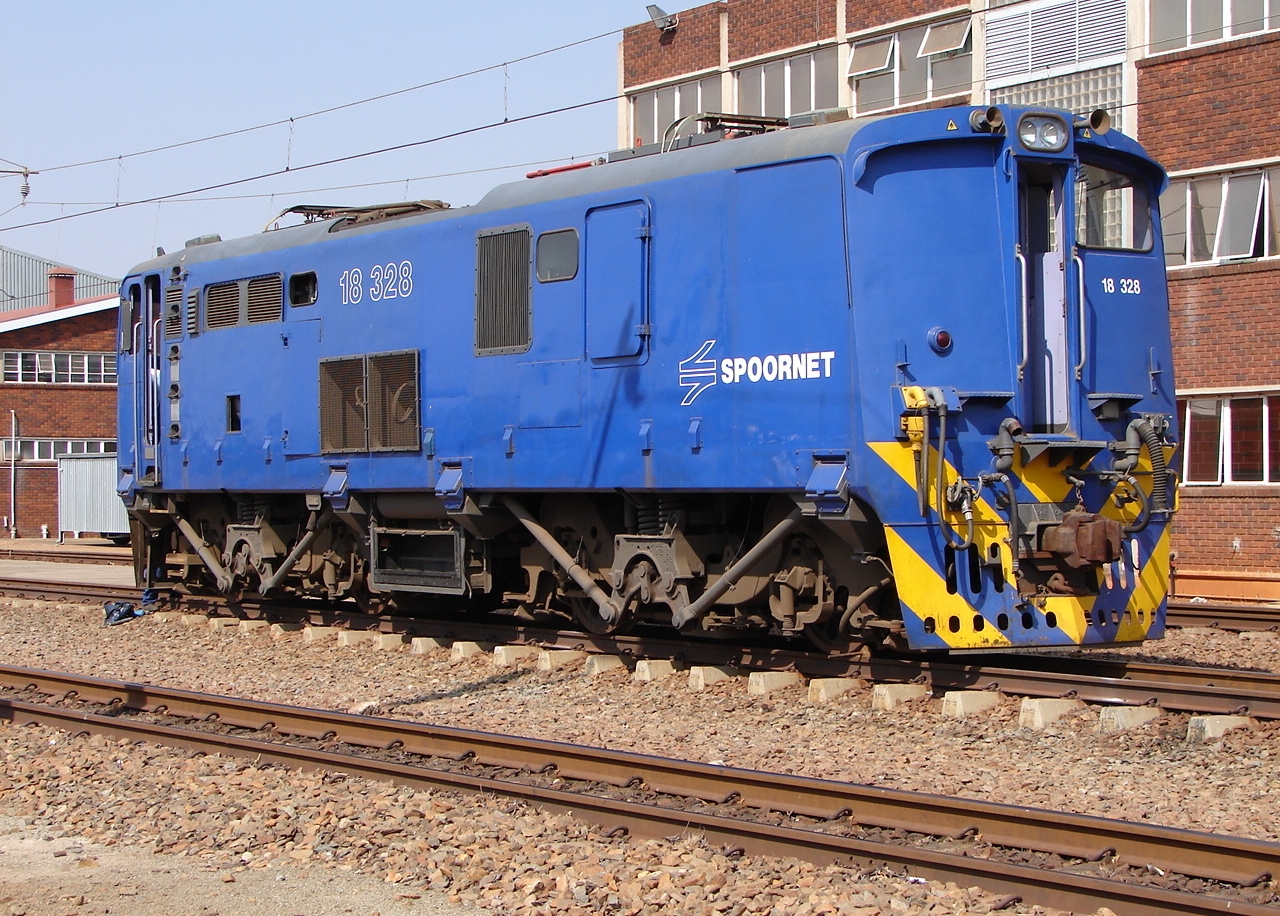
No. 18-328 (E2071) with no toilet window, at Sentrarand, Gauteng, 22 September 2009

Rebuilt from Class 6E1, Series 10

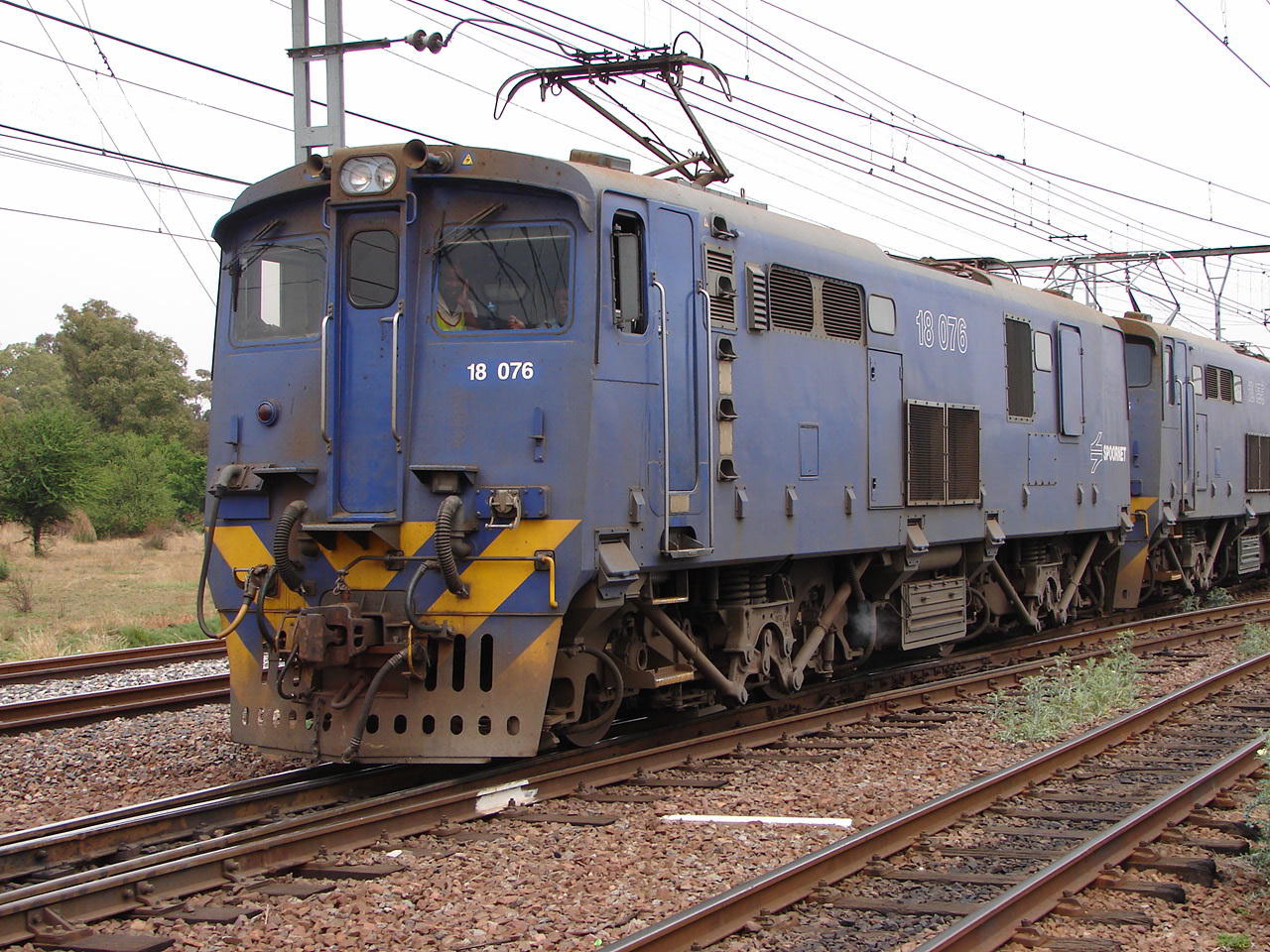
No. 18-076 (E2124) with covered drainage holes at Capital Park, Pretoria, 2 October 2006

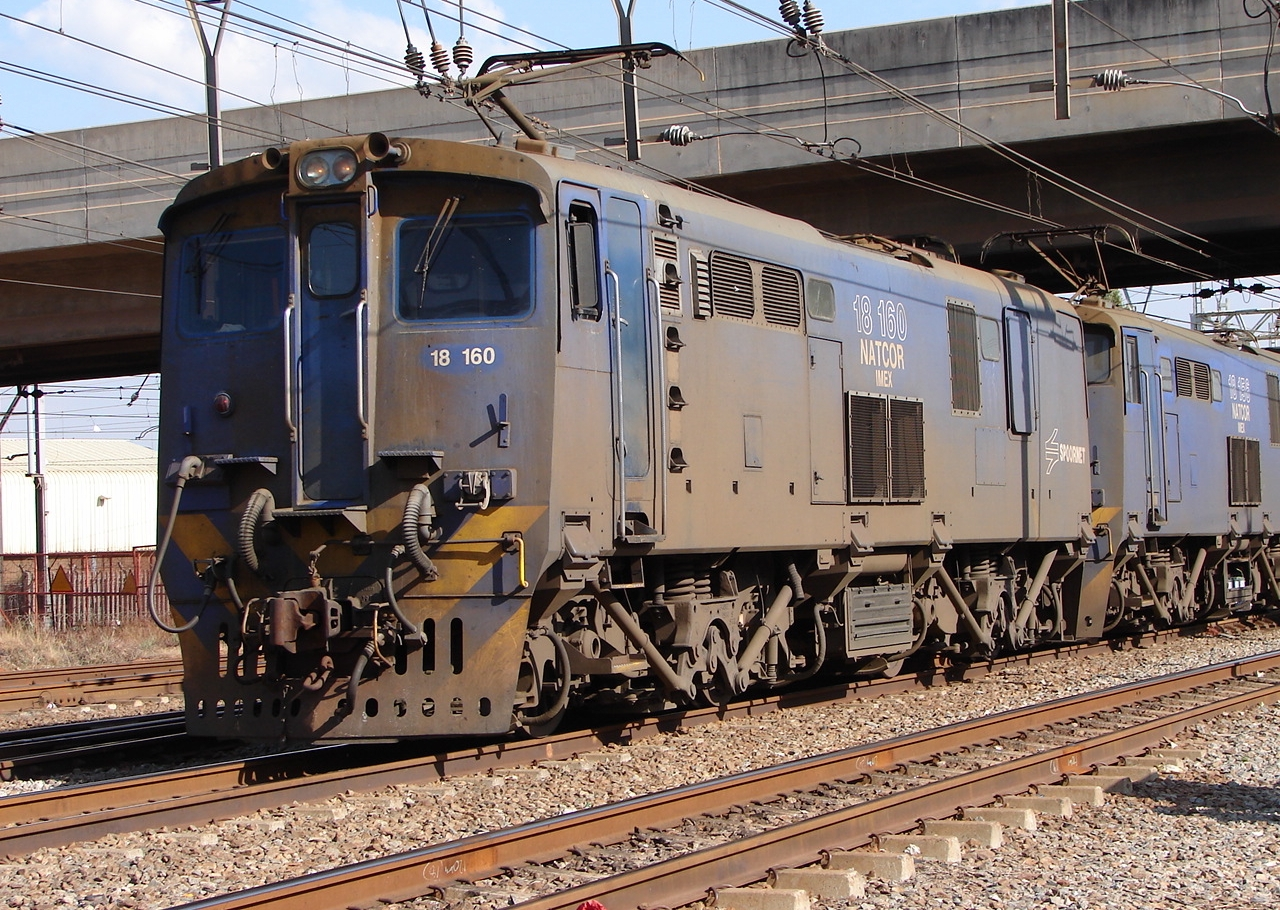
No. 18-160 (E2104) with uncovered drainage holes at Kaalfontein, 23 September 2009

Rebuilt from Class 6E1, Series 11

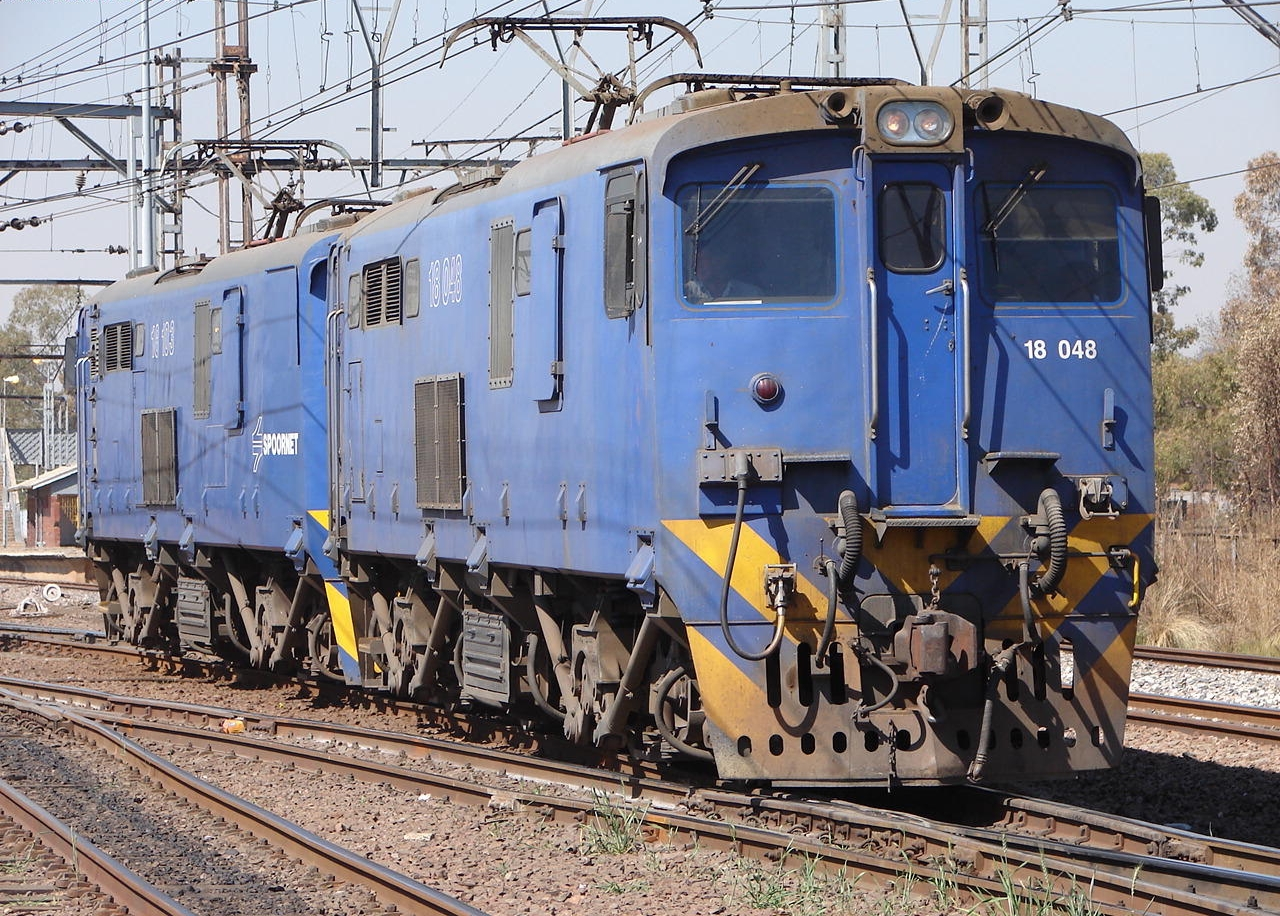
No. 18-048 (E2180) with covered drainage holes at Capital Park, Pretoria, 20 August 2007

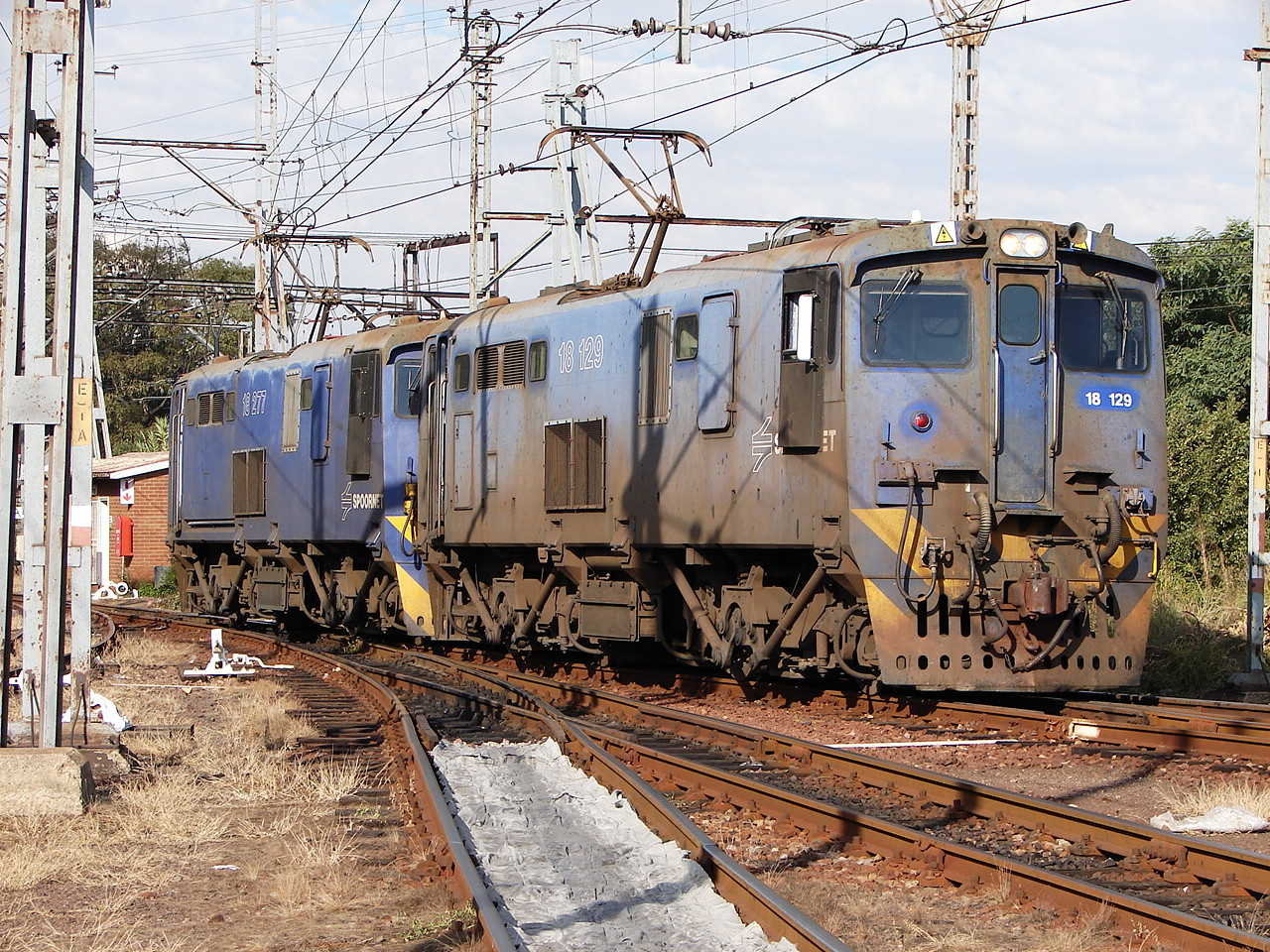
No. 18-129 (E2172) with uncovered drainage holes at Capital Park, 10 May 2013
