= Transnet Engineering =

South African rolling stock manufacturer

- Formerly: Transnet Rail Engineering; Transwerk
- Type: Division
- Industry: Railway equipment manufacturing
- Predecessor: Railway engineering workshops of Transnet
- Founded: 1990; 36 years ago
- Headquarters: Pretoria, Gauteng, South Africa
- Number of locations: 149 (2026)
- Area served: Southern Africa
- Key people: Bessie Mabunda (CEO)
- Products: Locomotives; Freight wagons Passenger coaches Port equipment
- Services: Research and development Engineering; Manufacturing; Remanufacturing; Maintenance
- Revenue: ▼ R9.8 billion (2025/26)
- Operating income: ▼ -R3.2 billion (2025/26)
- Net income: ▼ -R3.0 billion (2025/26)
- Number of employees: 7,157 (2025/26)
- Parent: Transnet
- Website: transnet.net/TransnetEngineering

Transnet Engineering is a South African rolling stock manufacturer and maintenance company, and an operating division of major state-owned transport and logistics company Transnet. Founded in 1990, the company is based in Pretoria, Gauteng, and as of 2026, operates six manufacturing plants and 143 maintenance depots across SA.

== History ==
Transnet Engineering has its origins in the railway mechanical workshops of the former South African Railways and Harbours and South African Transport Services. When state-owned transport and logistics company Transnet was established in 1990, the mechanical workshops separated from freight rail operator Spoornet and became a separate division known as Transwerk.

As part of Transnet's wider rebranding in 2007, Transwerk was renamed Transnet Rail Engineering. The change formed part of a broader renaming of Transnet's operating divisions, which also saw Spoornet become Transnet Freight Rail.

In 2013, Transnet Rail Engineering was renamed Transnet Engineering. The rebranding reflected the division's expansion beyond railway rolling stock into the engineering and manufacture of port and pipeline equipment.

The expansion into port equipment included the manufacture and assembly of equipment such as straddle carriers, alongside Transnet Engineering's established activities in the manufacture, refurbishment, and maintenance of locomotives, freight wagons, and passenger coaches.

== Operations ==
Transnet Engineering operates six main manufacturing plants in South Africa, located in Bloemfontein, Durban, Germiston, Pretoria, Cape Town, and Uitenhage. The plants serve as regional centers of excellence, with different facilities specializing in the manufacture, refurbishment, and maintenance of railway rolling stock and related equipment. Koedoespoort, for example, is Transnet Engineering's flagship manufacturing center, while Germiston has major wagon facilities and resources for the maintenance of diesel and electric locomotives.

The six plants are supported by a nationwide network of 143 maintenance depots serving the country's main rail corridors, ports, and terminals. The company's maintenance operations include 16 main locomotive depots; 29 in-service locomotive maintenance yards; 15 major and five minor freight wagon out-of-service maintenance depots; and 78 freight wagon in-service maintenance depots.

Transnet Engineering's operations include the design, manufacture, refurbishment, and maintenance of railway rolling stock, including locomotives, freight wagons, and passenger coaches. Its maintenance activities also cover port equipment, plant and machinery, and components such as wheels, traction motors, engines, compressors, and exhausters.

The company organizes its national operations around six major corridors, which provide regional hubs for its engineering and maintenance activities. These are the Cape Corridor, Container Corridor, Central Corridor, North Corridor, North East Corridor, and Ore Line.

== See also ==
- Transport in South Africa
- Manufacturing in South Africa
