= John Kemp (disambiguation) =

John Kemp (1380–1454) was Archbishop of Canterbury and Lord Chancellor of England.

John Kemp or Johnny Kemp may also refer to:

== Sports ==
- John Kemp (Australian footballer) (born 1944), Australian football player
- John Kemp (baseball), Negro league baseball player
- John Kemp (cricketer, born 1928), South African cricketer
- John Kemp (cricketer, born 1952), South African cricketer
- John Kemp (New Zealand footballer) (1940–1993), New Zealand international football (soccer) player

== Others ==
- John Kemp, 1st Viscount Rochdale (1906–1993), British peer, soldier and businessman
- John Arthur Kemp (1926–1987), master mariner, author, educationalist
- St John Kemp, 2nd Viscount Rochdale (1938–2015)
- John Kemp (antiquary) (1665–1717), English collector
- John Kemp (mathematician) (1763–1812), Scots-born mathematician who moved to New York
- John Dan Kemp (born c. 1951), Chief Justice of Arkansas
- John D. Kemp (born 1949), American disability rights leader
- Jonathan Johnny Kemp (1959–2015), Bahamian singer, songwriter, and record producer
