= 1977 in South Africa =

- Decades: 1950s; 1960s; 1970s; 1980s; 1990s
- See also: List of years in South Africa

The following lists events that happened during 1977 in South Africa.

== Incumbents ==
- State President: Nico Diederichs.
- Prime Minister: John Vorster.
- Chief Justice: Frans Lourens Herman Rumpff.

== Events ==
January

- 8 – The railway line near Soweto is maliciously damaged.

February

- 1 – KwaZulu is granted self-governance.
- 24 – A bomb explodes at the Daveyton Police Station, causing only superficial damage.

March

- 5 – British Formula One driver Tom Pryce dies during the South African Grand Prix at Kyalami when his car strikes and kills marshal Frederik Jansen van Vuuren.
- 7 – A Pretoria restaurant is destroyed by a bomb.

April

- 1 – Pik Botha, South Africa's ambassador in the United States of America, is appointed as Minister of Foreign Affairs.

June

- 4 – Father Smangaliso Mkhatshwa is served a 5-year restriction order.
- 15 – Monty Motlaung and Solomon Mahlangu, two Umkhonto we Sizwe cadres, kill two civilians and are arrested.
- 29 – The United Party is renamed the New Republic Party.

July

- 15 – The railway line at Umlazi in Durban is maliciously damaged.
- 29 – The Antipolis, a Greek oil tanker, runs aground on the rocks near Victoria Road in Oudekraal, Cape Town.

August

- A Soviet surveillance satellite detects South Africa's nuclear test preparations and alerts the United States.
- Black Consciousness leader Steve Biko is detained for breaking a banning order.

September

- 12 – Steve Biko, dies in police custody while being transported to Pretoria prison
- 23 – The Netherlands suspends its cultural agreement with South Africa.

November

- 4 – United Nations Security Council Resolution 418 places a mandatory arms embargo against South Africa.
- 25 – Fourteen people are injured when a bomb explodes at the Carlton Centre.
- 30 – A bomb explodes on a Pretoria-bound train.
- 30 – A whites only general election is held. The National Party wins.
- The railway at Dunswart (Boksburg) and Apex (Benoni) is maliciously damaged and a train driver is slightly injured.

December

- 12 – Guerrillas attack the Germiston police station.
- 14 – A bomb explodes at the Benoni railway station.
- 16 – The Venpet-Venoil collision between two supertankers occurs off the coast of Cape St. Francis.
- 22 – An unexploded bomb is found in OK Bazaars in Roodepoort.

Unknown date

- Former members of the United Party join the Progressive Reform Party, which is renamed the Progressive Federal Party.
- Cedric Mayson, a Methodist minister, is banned for 5 years.

== Births ==
- 20 January – Paul Adams (cricketer), cricketer
- 21 January – Bradley Carnell, football player
- 30 January – Khumbudzo Ntshavheni, national minister
- 31 January – David Terbrugge, cricketer
- 14 February – Elmer Symons, motorcycle enduro racer (d. 2007)
- 6 March – Khoto Sesinyi, Mosotho footballer
- 14 March – Matthew Booth (soccer), soccer player
- 24 April – Zola (musician), musician, poet, actor and presenter.
- 11 May – Victor Matfield, Springbok rugby player
- 21 May – Quinton Fortune, soccer player & coach
- 13 June – Stanton Fredericks, soccer player
- 18 June – Riaad Moosa, comedian, actor and doctor
- 6 July – Makhaya Ntini, cricketer
- 12 August – Zanne Stapelberg, soprano singer
- 26 August – Gareth Cliff, radio host, television personality and businessman
- 2 October – Justin Kemp, cricketer
- 21 October – Brett Goldin, actor (d. 2006)
- 12 November – Benni McCarthy, soccer striker & coach
- 12 November – Susan Wessels-Webber, hockey player
- 17 November – Ryk Neethling, swimmer
- 25 November – MacBeth Sibaya, soccer player
- 2 December – Siyabonga Nomvethe, soccer player
- 7 December – Delron Buckley, footballer

== Deaths ==
- 29 January – Buster Nupen 75, cricketer. (b. 1902)
- 20 February – Christoffel Venter 84, South African Air Force general. (b. 1892)
- 5 March – Tom Pryce 27, a Welsh racing driver, (b. 1949) killed during the 1977 South African Grand Prix in Midrand
- 8 March – Moses Kottler, sculptor. (b. 1896)
- 2 July – Gert Potgieter, 47, operatic tenor (b. 1929)
- 12 September – Steve Biko 30, black consciousness activist. (b. 1946)

== Railways ==
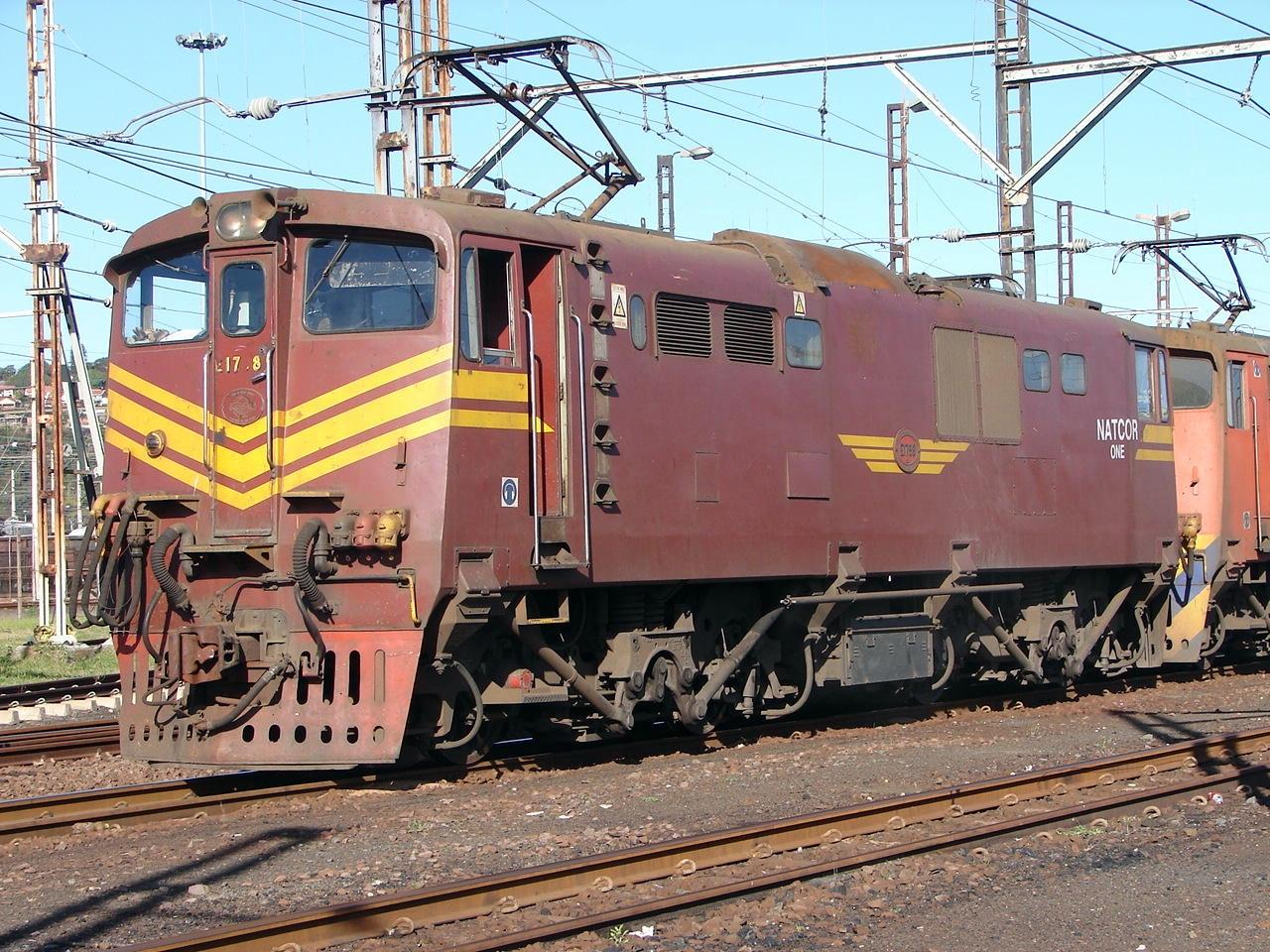
Class 6E1, Series 7

=== Locomotives ===
- The South African Railways places the first of 150 Class 6E1, Series 7 electric locomotives in mainline service.

== Sports ==
=== Motorsport ===
- 5 March – The South African Grand Prix takes place at Kyalami.
