= South African Class 6E1, Series 9 =

Class of 85 South African electric locomotives

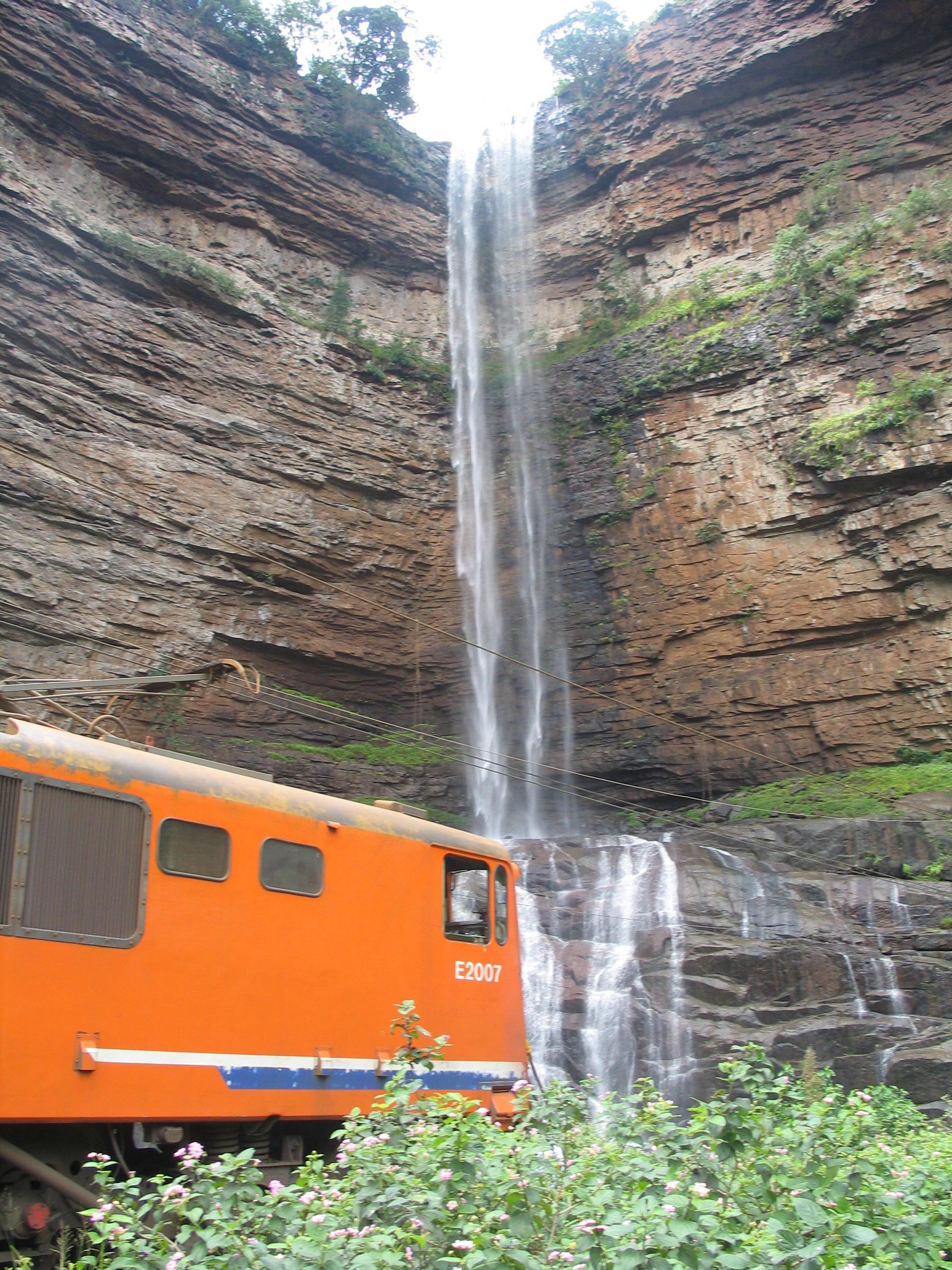
- E2007 at Kirk Falls between the Nshongweni and Brereton Tunnels, KwaZulu-Natal, 3 March 2004
Type and origin
- Power type: Electric
- Designer: Union Carriage & Wagon
- Builder: Union Carriage & Wagon
- Model: UCW 6E1
- Build date: 1981-1982
- Total produced: 85
- Rebuilder: ♠ Transwerk ♥ Transnet Rail Engineering
- Rebuild date: ♠ 1993-1994 - ♥ 2001-2007
- Number rebuilt: ♠ 70 known to Class 17E ♥ 83 to Class 18E, Series 1
Specifications
- Configuration
  - AAR: B-B
  - UIC: Bo'Bo'
  - Commonwealth: Bo-Bo
- Gauge: 3 ft 6 in (1,067 mm) Cape gauge
- Wheel diameter: 1,220 mm (48.03 in)
- Wheelbase: 11,279 mm (37 ft 0 in)
  - Bogie: 3,430 mm (11 ft 3 in)
- Pivot centres: 7,849 mm (25 ft 9 in)
- Panto shoes: 6,972 mm (22 ft 10 1/2 in)
- Length
  - Over couplers: 15,494 mm (50 ft 10 in)
  - Over body: 14,631 mm (48 ft 0 in)
- Width: 2,896 mm (9 ft 6 in)
- Height
  - Pantograph: 4,089 mm (13 ft 5 in)
  - Body height: 3,937 mm (12 ft 11 in)
- Axle load: 22,447 kg (49,487 lb)
- Adhesive weight: 89,788 kg (197,949 lb)
- Loco weight: 89,788 kg (197,949 lb)
- Electric system/s: 3 kV DC catenary
- Current pickup(s): Pantographs
- Traction motors: Four AEI-283AY
  - Rating 1 hour: 623 kW (835 hp)
  - Continuous: 563 kW (755 hp)
- Gear ratio: 18:67
- Loco brake: Air & Regenerative
- Train brakes: Air & Vacuum
- Couplers: AAR knuckle
Performance figures
- Maximum speed: 113 km/h (70 mph)
- Power output
  - 1 hour: 2,492 kW (3,342 hp)
  - Continuous: 2,252 kW (3,020 hp)
- Tractive effort
  - Starting: 311 kN (70,000 lbf)
  - 1 hour: 221 kN (50,000 lbf)
  - Continuous: 193 kN (43,000 lbf) @ 40 km/h (25 mph)
Career
- Operators: South African Railways; Spoornet
- Class: Class 6E1
- Number in class: 85
- Numbers: E2001-E2085
- Delivered: 1981-1982
- First run: 1981
- Last run: 2007

The South African Railways Class 6E1, Series 9 of 1981 was an electric locomotive.

In 1981 and 1982, the South African Railways placed eighty-five Class 6E1, Series 9 electric locomotives with a Bo-Bo wheel arrangement in mainline service.

== Manufacturer ==
The 3 kV DC Class 6E1, Series 9 electric locomotive was designed and built for the South African Railways (SAR) by Union Carriage & Wagon (UCW) in Nigel, Transvaal. The electrical equipment was supplied by the General Electric Company (GEC).

In 1981 and 1982, 85 Series 9 locomotives were delivered, numbered in the range from E2001 to E2085. Like Series 6 to 8, the Series 9 units were equipped with AEI-283AY traction motors. UCW did not allocate builder's or works numbers to the locomotives it built for the SAR, but used the SAR unit numbers for their record keeping.

== Characteristics ==
=== Orientation ===
These dual cab locomotives had a roof access ladder on one side only, just to the right of the cab access door. The roof access ladder end was marked as the no. 2 end. A corridor along the centre of the locomotive connected the cabs which were identical apart from the fact that the handbrake was located in cab 2. A pantograph hook stick was stowed in a tube mounted below the lower edge of the locomotive body on the roof access ladder side. The locomotive had one square and two rectangular access panels along the lower half of the body and a large hatch door below the second small window to the right of the side door on the roof access ladder side, and only one square access panel and a large hatch door below the first window immediately to the right of the door on the opposite side.

=== Series identifying features ===
The Class 6E1 was produced in eleven series over a period of nearly sixteen years. While some of the Class 6E1 series are visually indistinguishable from their predecessors or successors, some externally visible changes did occur over the years.

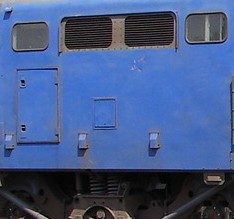
Drainage holes on Series 9 to 11

Series 8 and later locomotives could be distinguished from all older models by the large hatch door on each side. The Series 9 to Series 11 locomotives were visually indistinguishable from each other, but could be distinguished from all earlier models by the rainwater drainage holes on their lower sides. These holes were usually covered by so-called buckets, but the covers were absent on some locomotives. Another distinction was the end doors, which were recessed into the doorframes on Series 9 to Series 11 locomotives, compared to earlier models which had their end doors flush with the doorframes. In addition, on Series 9 and later models, the two side windows on the driver's assistant side were replaced by a single rectangular side window with rounded corners. Finally, unlike all earlier models, all four doors on Series 9 to Series 11 locomotives had rounded corners.

=== Crew access ===
The Classes 5E, 5E1, 6E and earlier 6E1 series locomotives were notoriously difficult to enter from ground level since their lever-style door handles were at waist level when standing inside the cab. This made it impossible to open the door from outside without first climbing up high enough to reach the door handle while hanging on to the side handrails with one hand only. Crews therefore often chose to leave the doors ajar when parking and exiting the locomotives.

Side doors with two interconnected latch handles on the outside, such as those which were introduced on the Class 7E1 with one outside handle mounted near floor level and the other at mid-door level, were also introduced on Class 6E1 locomotives beginning with Series 9.

== Service ==
The Class 6E1 family saw service all over both 3 kV DC mainline and branch line networks, the smaller Cape Western mainline between Cape Town and Beaufort West and the larger network which covers portions of the Northern Cape, the Free State, Natal, Gauteng, North West and Mpumalanga.

== Reclassification and rebuilding ==
=== Reclassification to Class 16E ===
During 1990 and 1991, Spoornet semi-permanently coupled several pairs of otherwise largely unmodified Class 6E1 locomotives, reclassified them to Class 16E and allocated a single locomotive number to each pair, with the individual units in the pairs inscribed "A" or "B". The aim was to accomplish savings on cab maintenance by coupling the units at their no. 1 ends, abandoning the no. 1 end cabs in terms of maintenance and using only the no. 2 end cabs. Most pairs were later either disbanded with the units reverting to Class 6E1 and regaining their original numbers or getting rebuilt to Class 18E.

The first two Series 9 locomotives, numbers E2001 and E2002, were built as experimental logic control locomotives. They were the only two Series 9 units to have been reclassified and renumbered to Class 16E, becoming no. 16-500A and B.

=== Modification to Class 17E ===
During 1993 and 1994, Class 17E locomotives were modified and reclassified from Class 6E1 Series 7, 8 or 9 locomotives. Key modifications included improved regenerative braking and wheel-slip control to improve their reliability on the steep gradients and curves of the Natal mainline. Unlike the unmodified but reclassified Class 16E locomotives, the Class 17Es retained their original unit numbers after reclassification.

A stumbling block was that the regeneration equipment at many of the sub-stations along the route was unreliable, and since there was no guarantee that another train would be in the same section to absorb the regenerated energy, there was always the risk that line voltage could exceed 4.1 kV, which would make either the sub-station or the locomotive trip out. As a result, the subsequently rebuilt Class 18E locomotives were not equipped with regenerative braking.

Seventy known Series 9 locomotives were reclassified to Class 17E. Their unit numbers are displayed in the table below.

=== Rebuilding to Class 18E ===
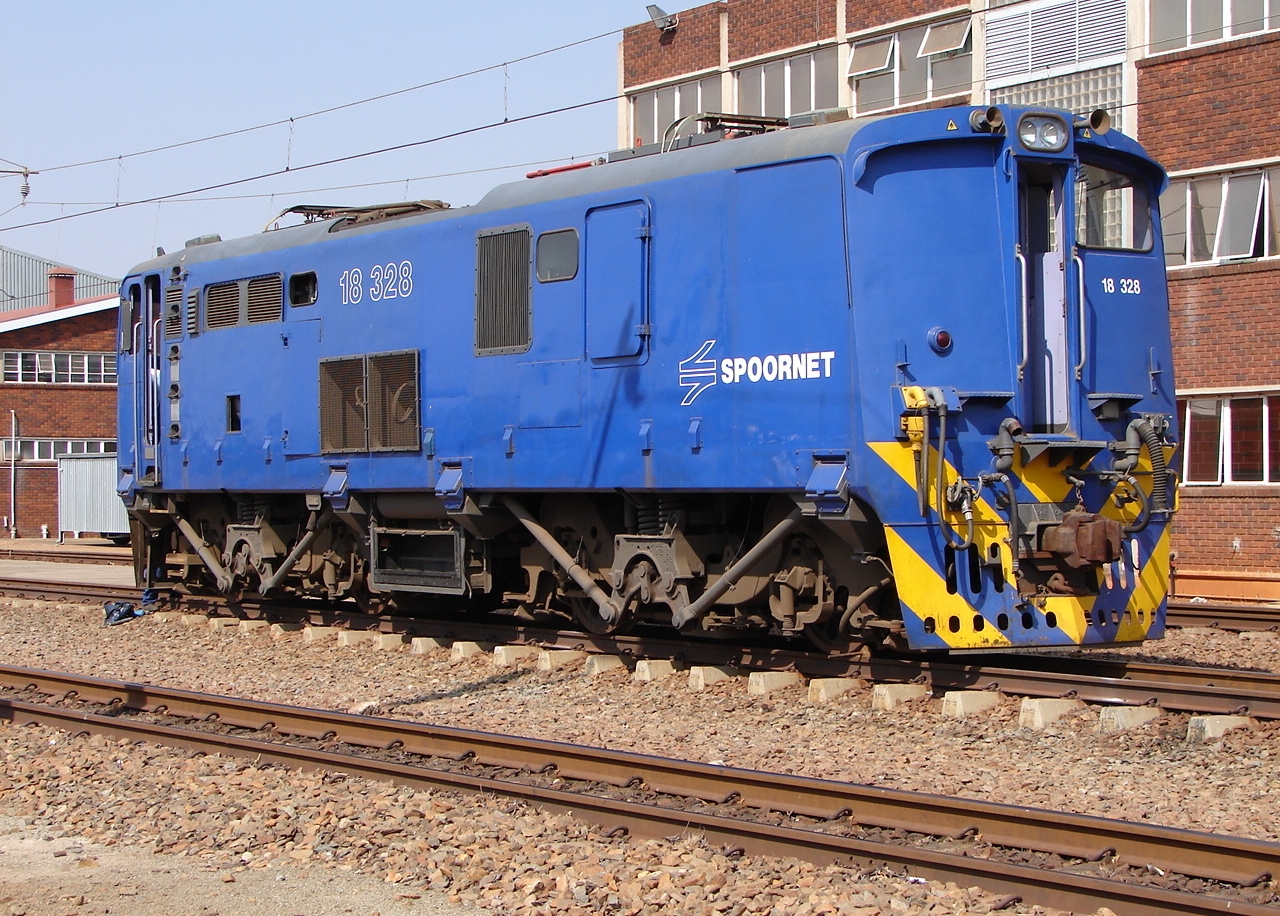
Cab 1 of Class 18E no. 18-328, ex Class 6E1 no. E2071, Sentrarand, Gauteng, 22 September 2009

Beginning in 2000, Spoornet began a project to rebuild Series 2 to 11 Class 6E1 locomotives to Class 18E, Series 1 and Series 2 at the Transnet Rail Engineering (TRE) workshops at Koedoespoort. In the process, the cab at the no. 1 end was stripped of all controls and the driver's front and side windows were blanked off to have a toilet installed, thereby forfeiting the locomotive's bi-directional ability.

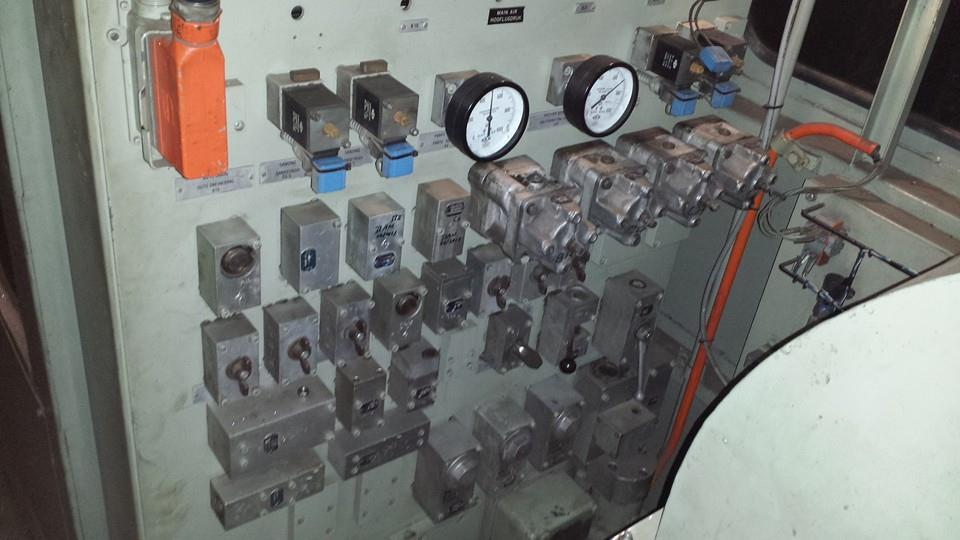
Brake rack in Class 18E no. 18-089

Since the driving cab's noise level had to be below 85 decibels, cab 2 was selected as the Class 18E driving cab primarily based on its lower noise level compared to cab 1, which was closer and more exposed to the compressor's noise and vibration. Another factor was the closer proximity of cab 2 to the low voltage switch panel. The fact that the handbrake was located in cab 2 was not a deciding factor, but was considered an additional benefit.

While the earlier Class 6E1, Series 2 to 7 locomotives had been built with a brake system which consisted of various valves connected to each other with pipes, commonly referred to as a "bicycle frame" brake system, the Class 6E1, Series 8 to 11 locomotives were built with an air equipment frame brake system, commonly referred to as a "brake rack". Since the design of the rebuilt Class 18E locomotives included the same brake rack, the rebuilding project was begun with the newer series 8 to 11 locomotives to reduce the overall cost of rebuilding.

The Class 6E1, Series 9 locomotives which were used in this project were all rebuilt to Class 18E, Series 1 locomotives. Their numbers and renumbering details are shown in the table.

Class 6E1, Series 9 units rebuilt to Class 18E as on 31 January 2014
Count	6E1 no.	Year built	18E no.	18E series	Year rebuilt	Notes
1	E2001	1981	18-029	1	2002	ex 16-500A
2	E2002	1981	18-030	1	2002	ex 16-500B
3	E2003	1981-82	18-285	1	2006	ex 17E
4	E2004	1981-82	18-009	1	2001	
5	E2005	1981-82	18-308	1	2007	ex 17E
6	E2006	1981-82	18-325	1	2007	ex 17E
7	E2007	1981-82	18-236	1	2005	ex 17E
8	E2008	1981-82	18-275	1	2006	ex 17E
9	E2009	1981-82	18-042	1	2002	
10	E2010	1981-82	18-022	1	2002	
11	E2011	1981-82	18-255	1	2006	ex 17E
12	E2012	1981-82	18-273	1	2006	ex 17E
13	E2013	1981-82	18-050	1	2002	
14	E2014	1981-82	18-058	1	2002	
15	E2015	1981-82	18-261	1	2006	ex 17E
16	E2016	1981-82	18-232	1	2005	ex 17E
17	E2017	1981-82	18-299	1	2006	ex 17E
18	E2018	1981-82	18-249	1	2006	ex 17E
19	E2019	1981-82	18-252	1	2006	ex 17E
20	E2020	1981-82	18-194	1	2005	ex 17E
21	E2021	1981-82	18-045	1	2002	
22	E2022	1981-82	18-211	1	2005	ex 17E
23	E2023	1981-82	18-267	1	2006	ex 17E
24	E2024	1981-82	18-259	1	2006	ex 17E
25	E2025	1981-82	18-193	1	2005	ex 17E
26	E2026	1981-82	18-196	1	2005	ex 17E
27	E2027	1981-82	18-319	1	2007	ex 17E
28	E2028	1981-82	18-210	1	2005	ex 17E
29	E2029	1981-82	18-327	1	2007	ex 17E
30	E2030	1981-82	18-223	1	2005	ex 17E
31	E2031	1981-82	18-304	1	2006	ex 17E
32	E2032	1981-82	18-301	1	2006	ex 17E
33	E2033	1981-82	18-246	1	2006	ex 17E
34	E2034	1981-82	18-254	1	2006	ex 17E
35	E2036	1981-82	18-247	1	2006	ex 17E
36	E2037	1981-82	18-037	1	2002	ex 17E
37	E2038	1981-82	18-074	1	2003	ex 17E
38	E2039	1981-82	18-230	1	2005	ex 17E
39	E2040	1981-82	18-241	1	2006	ex 17E
40	E2041	1981-82	18-276	1	2006	ex 17E
41	E2042	1981-82	18-227	1	2005	ex 17E
42	E2043	1981-82	18-234	1	2005	ex 17E
43	E2044	1982	18-219	1	2005	ex 17E
44	E2045	1982	18-238	1	2005	ex 17E
45	E2046	1982	18-271	1	2006	ex 17E
46	E2047	1982	18-268	1	2006	ex 17E
47	E2048	1982	18-258	1	2006	ex 17E
48	E2050	1982	18-239	1	2006	ex 17E
49	E2051	1982	18-229	1	2005	ex 17E
50	E2052	1982	18-218	1	2005	ex 17E
51	E2053	1982	18-093	1	2003	ex 17E
52	E2054	1982	18-257	1	2006	ex 17E
53	E2055	1982	18-028	1	2002	ex 17E
54	E2056	1982	18-079	1	2003	ex 17E
55	E2057	1982	18-240	1	2005	ex 17E
56	E2058	1982	18-253	1	2006	ex 17E
57	E2059	1982	18-321	1	2007	ex 17E
58	E2060	1982	18-250	1	2006	ex 17E
59	E2061	1982	18-056	1	2002	
60	E2062	1982	18-282	1	2006	ex 17E
61	E2063	1982	18-242	1	2006	ex 17E
62	E2064	1982	18-281	1	2006	ex 17E
63	E2065	1982	18-192	1	2005	ex 17E
64	E2066	1982	18-212	1	2005	ex 17E
65	E2067	1982	18-245	1	2006	ex 17E
66	E2068	1982	18-302	1	2006	ex 17E
67	E2069	1982	18-291	1	2006	ex 17E
68	E2070	1982	18-224	1	2005	ex 17E
69	E2071	1982	18-328	1	2007	ex 17E
70	E2072	1982	18-020	1	2002	
71	E2073	1982	18-243	1	2006	ex 17E
72	E2074	1982	18-008	1	2001	
73	E2075	1982	18-073	1	2003	ex 17E
74	E2076	1982	18-228	1	2005	ex 17E
75	E2077	1982	18-244	1	2006	ex 17E
76	E2078	1982	18-054	1	2002	
77	E2079	1982	18-127	1	2004	ex 17E
78	E2080	1982	18-181	1	2005	
79	E2081	1982	18-251	1	2006	ex 17E
80	E2082	1982	18-235	1	2005	ex 17E
81	E2083	1982	18-057	1	2002	
82	E2084	1982	18-217	1	2005	ex 17E
83	E2085	1982	18-214	1	2005	ex 17E

== Liveries ==
All the Class 6E1, Series 9 locomotives were delivered in the SAR Gulf Red livery with signal red cowcatchers, yellow whiskers and with the number plates on the sides mounted on three-stripe yellow wings. In the 1990s many of the Series 9 units began to be repainted in the Spoornet orange livery with a yellow and blue chevron pattern on the cowcatchers.

== Illustration ==
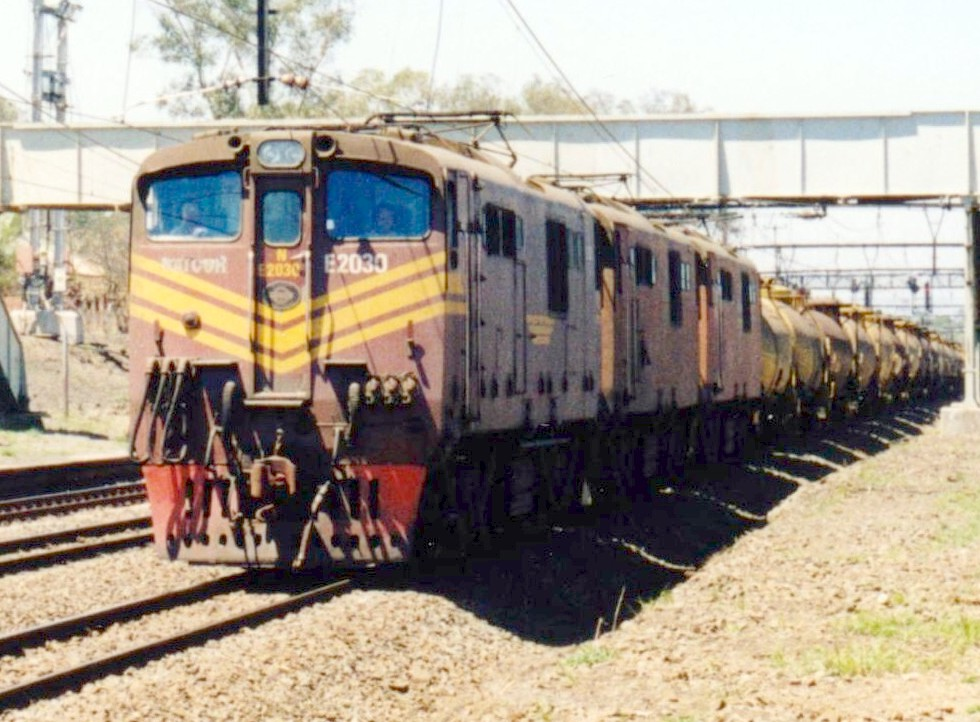
No. E2030 in SAR Gulf Red & whiskers at Chieveley, KwaZulu-Natal, c. 1999

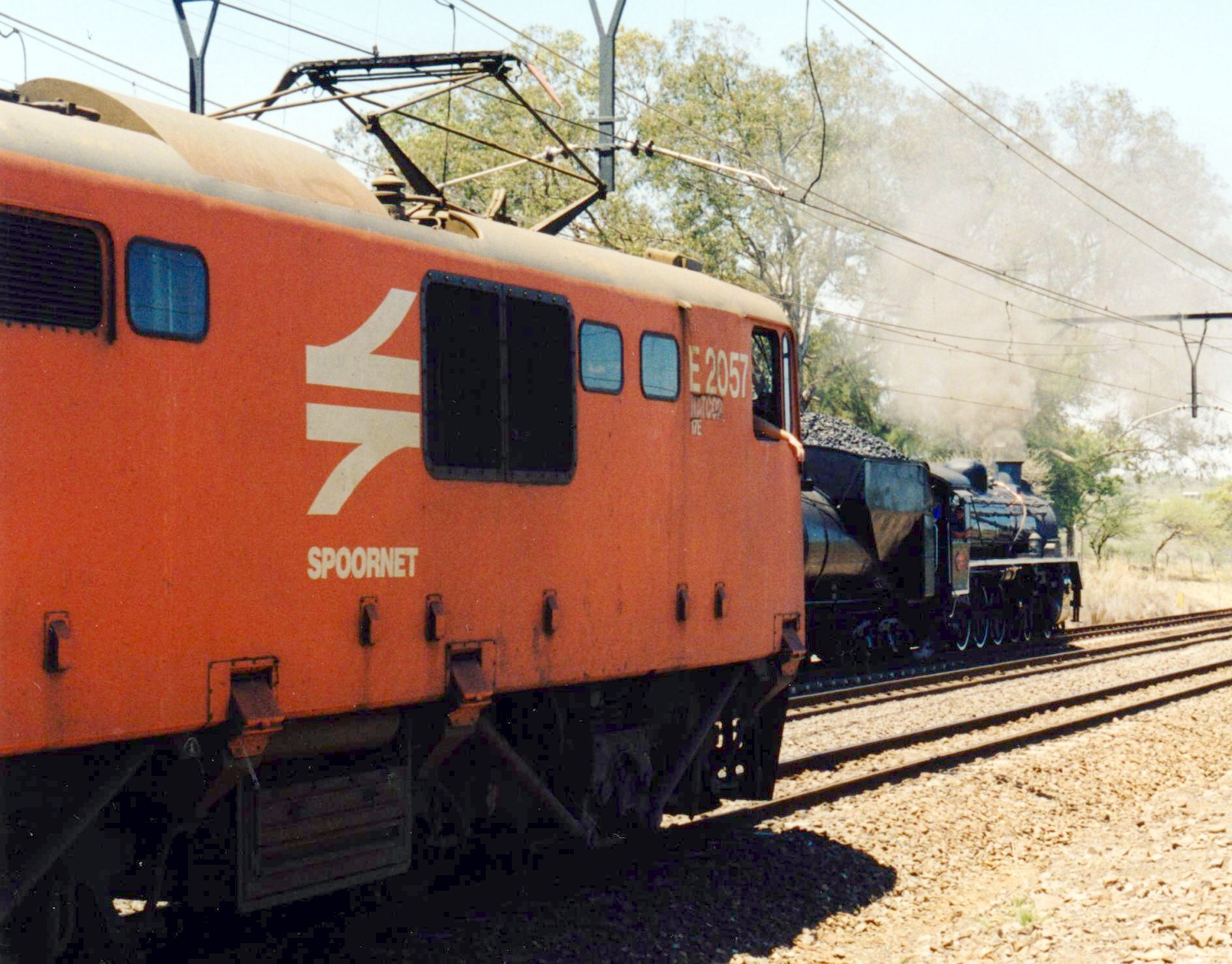
No. E2057 in Spoornet orange livery at Chieveley, KwaZulu-Natal, c. 1999
