= Smangaliso =

Smangaliso is a masculine given name. Notable people with the name include:

- Smangaliso Mkhatshwa, South African politician
- Smangaliso Nhlebela (born 1994), South African cricketer
