= John Kemp (cricketer, born 1952) =

South African cricketer (1952–2017)

Personal information
- Full name: John Wesley Kemp
- Born: 28 October 1952; Queenstown, South Africa
- Died: 9 May 2017 (aged 64)
- Relatives: JM Kemp (father); Justin Kemp (son); Dave Callaghan (cousin)
- Source: Cricinfo, 6 December 2020

John Kemp (28 October 1952 – 9 May 2017) was a South African cricketer. He played in three first-class matches for Border in 1975/76 and 1976/77. His father John Miles Kemp also played for Border, and his son Justin Kemp played international cricket for South Africa.

== See also ==
- List of Border representative cricketers
