= South African Class 6E1, Series 7 =

Type of electric locomotive

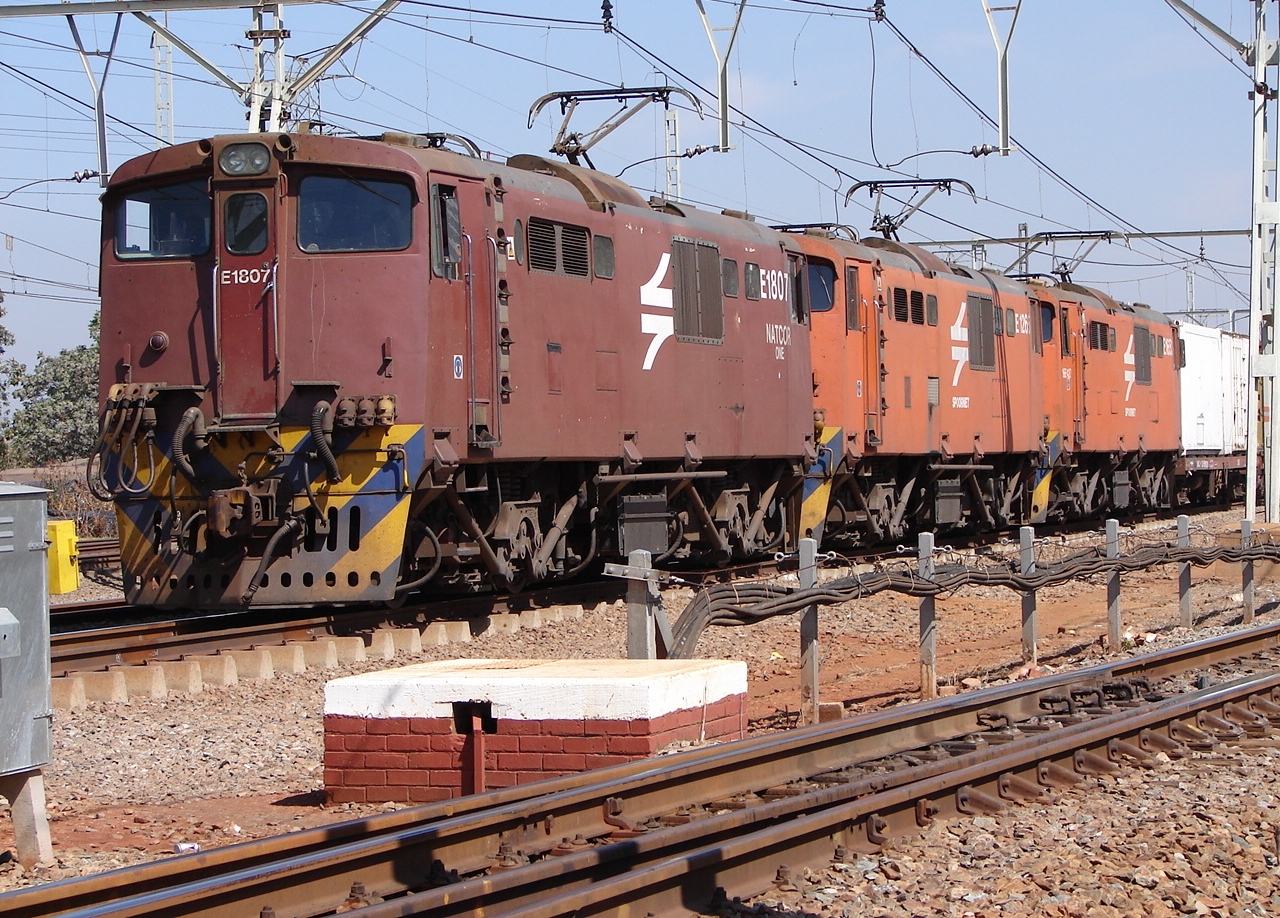
- E1807 at Kaalfontein, 23 September 2009
Type and origin
- Power type: Electric
- Designer: Union Carriage & Wagon
- Builder: Union Carriage & Wagon
- Model: UCW 6E1
- Build date: 1977-1979
- Total produced: 150
- Rebuilder: ♠ Transwerk ♥ Transnet Rail Engineering
- Rebuild date: ♠ 1993-1994 - ♥ 2003-2013
- Number rebuilt: ♠ 14 known to Class 17E ♥ 139 to Class 18E, Series 1 & 2
Specifications
- Configuration
  - AAR: B-B
  - UIC: Bo'Bo'
  - Commonwealth: Bo-Bo
- Gauge: 3 ft 6 in (1,067 mm) Cape gauge
- Wheel diameter: 1,220 mm (48.03 in)
- Wheelbase: 11,279 mm (37 ft 0 in)
  - Bogie: 3,430 mm (11 ft 3 in)
- Pivot centres: 7,849 mm (25 ft 9 in)
- Panto shoes: 6,972 mm (22 ft 10 1/2 in)
- Length
  - Over couplers: 15,494 mm (50 ft 10 in)
  - Over body: 14,631 mm (48 ft 0 in)
- Width: 2,896 mm (9 ft 6 in)
- Height
  - Pantograph: 4,089 mm (13 ft 5 in)
  - Body height: 3,937 mm (12 ft 11 in)
- Axle load: 22,226 kg (49,000 lb)
- Adhesive weight: 88,904 kg (196,000 lb)
- Loco weight: 88,904 kg (196,000 lb)
- Electric system/s: 3 kV DC catenary
- Current pickup(s): Pantographs
- Traction motors: Four AEI-283AY
  - Rating 1 hour: 623 kW (835 hp)
  - Continuous: 563 kW (755 hp)
- Gear ratio: 18:67
- Loco brake: Air & Regenerative
- Train brakes: Air & Vacuum
- Couplers: AAR knuckle
Performance figures
- Maximum speed: 113 km/h (70 mph)
- Power output
  - 1 hour: 2,492 kW (3,342 hp)
  - Continuous: 2,252 kW (3,020 hp)
- Tractive effort
  - Starting: 311 kN (70,000 lbf)
  - 1 hour: 221 kN (50,000 lbf)
  - Continuous: 193 kN (43,000 lbf) @ 40 km/h (25 mph)
Career
- Operators: South African Railways; Spoornet; Transnet Freight Rail; PRASA
- Class: Class 6E1
- Number in class: 150
- Numbers: E1746-E1895
- Delivered: 1977-1979
- First run: 1977

The South African Railways Class 6E1, Series 7 of 1977 was an electric locomotive.

Between 1977 and 1979, the South African Railways placed 150 Class 6E1, Series 7 electric locomotives with a Bo-Bo wheel arrangement in mainline service.

== Manufacturer ==
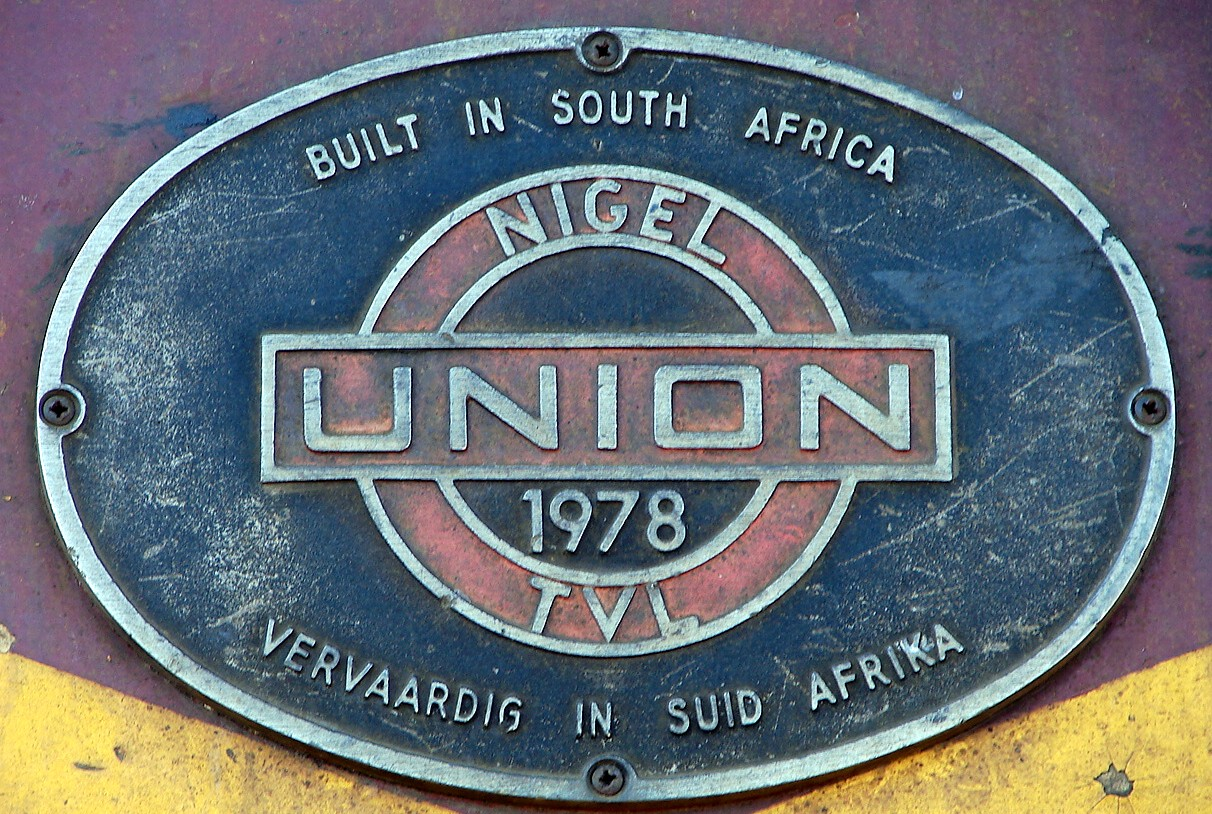
Builder's plate

The 3 kV DC Class 6E1, Series 7 electric locomotive was designed and built for the South African Railways (SAR) by Union Carriage & Wagon (UCW) in Nigel, Transvaal. The electrical equipment was supplied by the General Electric Company (GEC).

The 150 units were delivered between 1977 and 1979, numbered in the range from E1746 to E1895. Like Series 6, the Series 7 units were equipped with AEI-283AY traction motors. UCW did not allocate builder's or works numbers to the locomotives it built for the SAR and used the SAR unit numbers for their record keeping.

== Characteristics ==
=== Orientation ===
These dual cab locomotives had a roof access ladder on one side only, just to the right of the cab access door. The roof access ladder end was marked as the no. 2 end. A corridor along the centre of the unit connected the cabs which were identical apart from the fact that the handbrake was located in cab 2. A pantograph hook stick was stowed in a tube mounted below the lower edge of the locomotive body on the roof access ladder side. The locomotive had one square and two rectangular access panels along the lower half of the body on the roof access ladder side, and only one square access panel on the opposite side.

=== Series identifying features ===
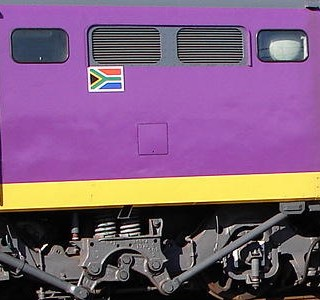
Hatchless left side of Series 7 no. E1834

The Class 6E1 was produced in eleven series over a period of nearly sixteen years. While some Class 6E1 series are visually indistinguishable from their predecessors or successors, some externally visible changes did occur over the years.

The Series 6 and Series 7 locomotives are visually indistinguishable from each other, but can be distinguished from all the older series models by the rainwater beading that had been added above the small grilles on the sides aft of the side doors. Beginning with Series 8, all subsequent series had a large hatch door on each side to the right of their side doors.

=== Crew access ===
The Class 5E, 5E1, 6E and 6E1 locomotives were notoriously difficult to enter from ground level since their lever-style door handles were at waist level when standing inside the cab, making it impossible to open the door from outside without first climbing up high enough to reach the door handle while hanging on to the side handrails with one hand only. Crews therefore often chose to leave the doors ajar when parking and exiting the units.

Late-model Series 7 locomotives were equipped with side doors on which the outside door latch handle was mounted near floor level with a simple drawer pull type handle at mid-door level. Unit no. E1845 and later numbers were observed with such lower mounted door handles. Unit no. E1882 was one observed exception with a high-mounted door handle, although this may have been the result of a door replacement.

== Service ==
The Class 6E1 family saw service all over both 3 kV DC mainline and branch line networks, the smaller Cape Western mainline between Cape Town and Beaufort West and the larger network which covers portions of the Northern Cape, the Free State, Natal, Gauteng, North West and Mpumalanga.

== Reclassification and rebuilding ==
=== Reclassification to Class 16E ===
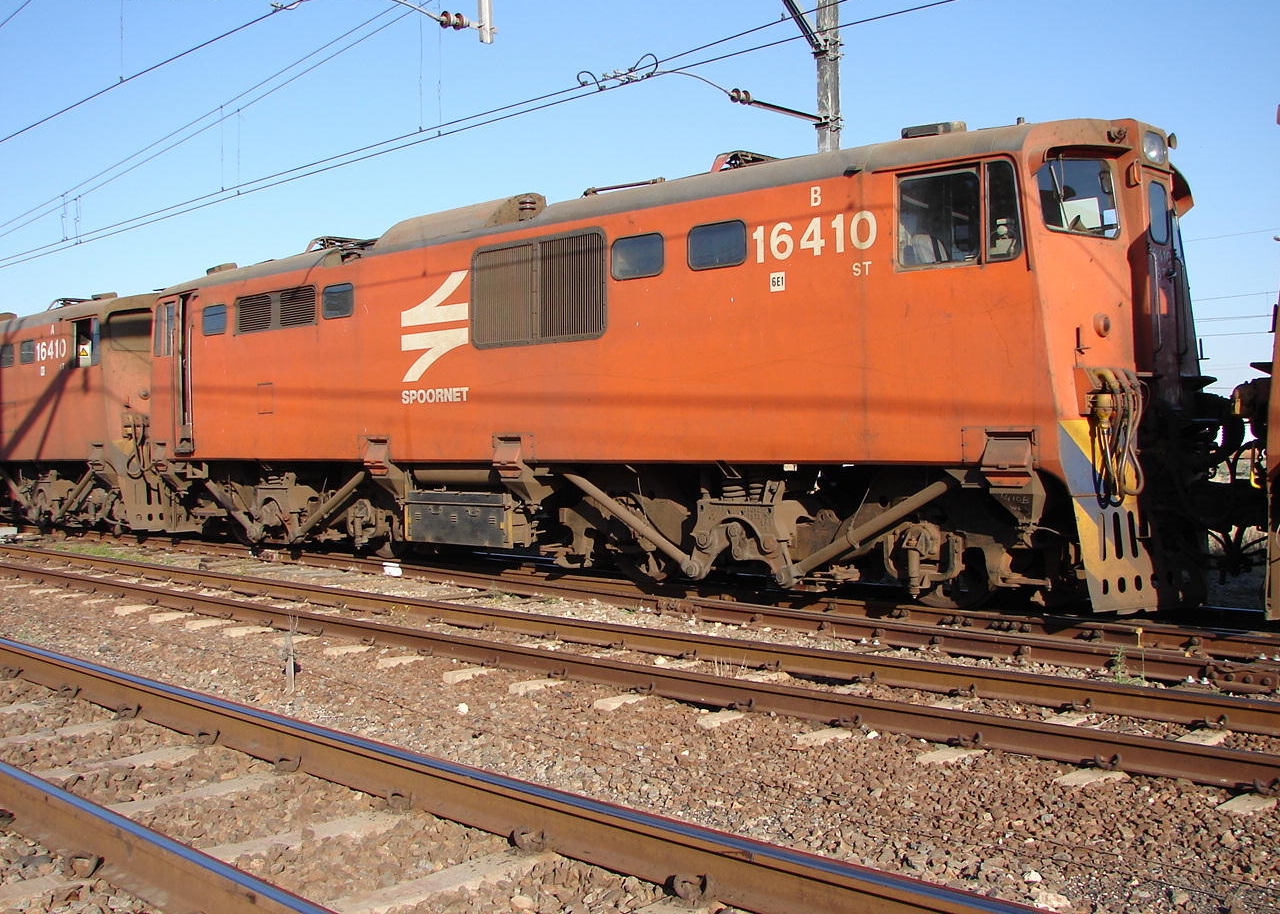
No. E1851 as Class 16E no. 16-410B, Christiana, 22 September 2006

During 1990 and 1991, Spoornet semi-permanently coupled several pairs of otherwise largely unmodified Class 6E1 units, reclassified them to Class 16E and allocated a single locomotive number to each pair, with the individual units in the pairs inscribed "A" or "B". The aim was to accomplish savings on cab maintenance by coupling the units at their no. 1 ends, abandoning the no. 1 end cabs in terms of maintenance and using only the no. 2 end cabs. Most pairs were later either disbanded with the units reverting to Class 6E1 and regaining their original numbers or getting rebuilt to Class 18E.

Twelve known Series 7 locomotives were part of such Class 16E pairs.

- E1790 became 16-407B.
- E1840 and E1841 became 16-409 A and B.
- E1846 and E1847 became 16-404 A and B.
- E1848 and E1849 became 16-405 A and B.
- E1850 and E1851 became 16-410 A and B.
- E1858 and E1859 became 16-411 A and B.
- E1870 became 16-406B.

=== Modification to Class 17E ===
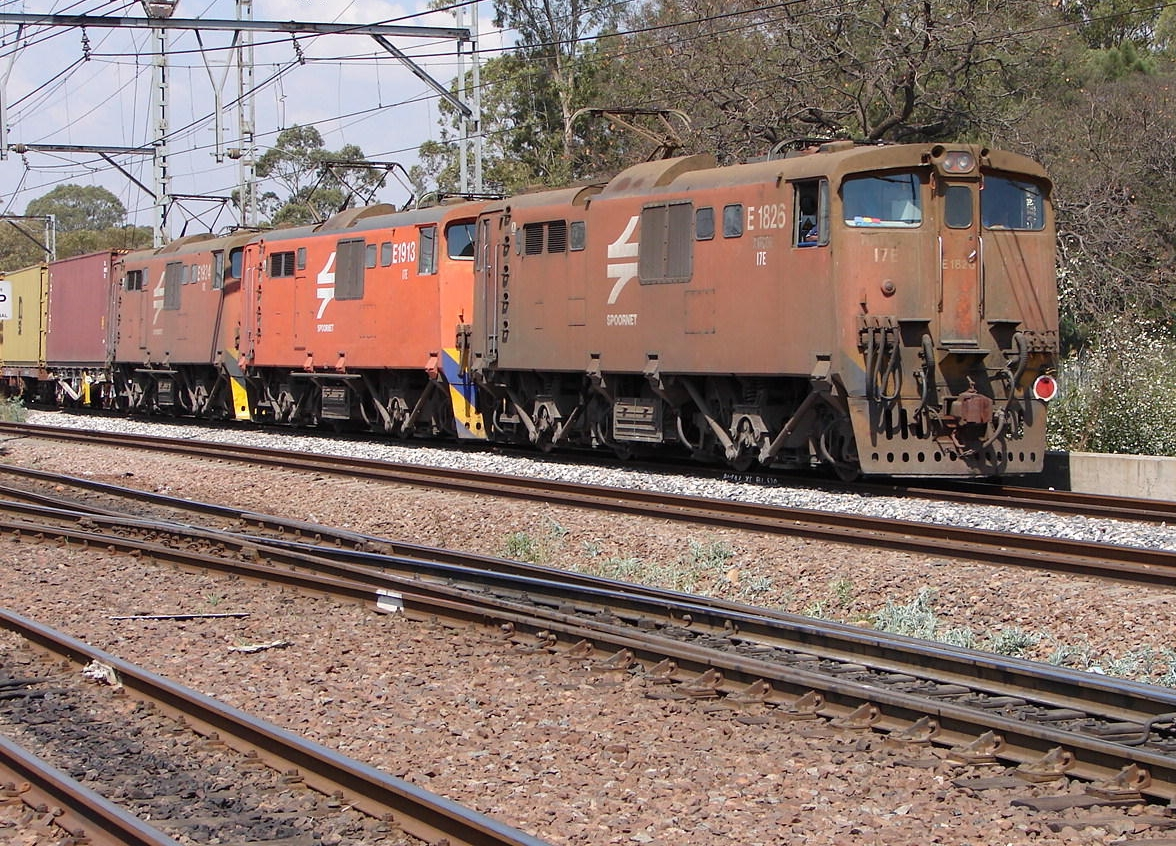
No. E1826 as Class 17E, Capital Park, 28 September 2006

Class 17E locomotives were modified and reclassified from Class 6E1, Series 7, 8 and 9 locomotives during 1993 and 1994. Key modifications included improved regenerative braking and wheel-slip control to improve their reliability on the steep gradients and curves of the Natal mainline. Unlike the unmodified but reclassified Class 16E locomotives, the Class 17Es retained their original unit numbers after reclassification.

A stumbling block was that the regeneration equipment at many of the sub-stations along the route was unreliable. Since there was no guarantee that another train would be in the same section to absorb the regenerated energy, there was always the risk that line voltage could exceed 4.1 kV which would make either the sub-station or the locomotive trip out. As a result, the subsequently rebuilt Class 18E locomotives were not equipped with regenerative braking.

Fourteen Series 7 units are known to have been modified and reclassified to Class 17E, their numbers being E1749, E1775, E1776, E1777, E1778, E1801, E1803, E1805, E1810, E1822, E1826, E1827, E1832 and E1843. Twelve of them were subsequently rebuilt to Class 18E, the exceptions being numbers E1778 and E1803.

=== Rebuilding to Class 18E ===
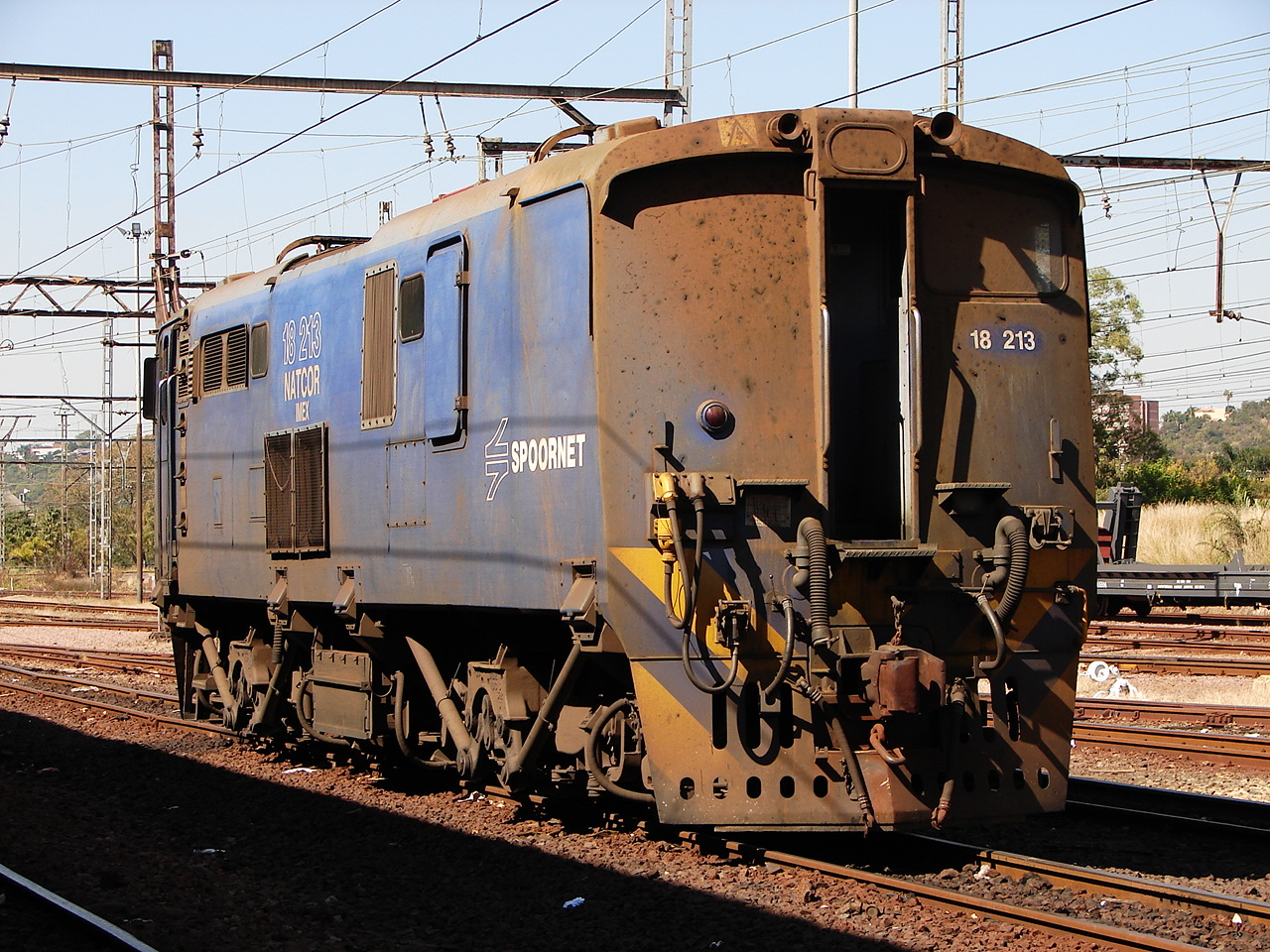
Cab 1 of Class 18E no. 18-213, ex Class 6E1 no. E1873, Capital Park, Pretoria, 6 May 2013

In 2000, Spoornet began a project to rebuild Series 2 to 11 Class 6E1 locomotives to Class 18E, Series 1 and Series 2 at the Transnet Rail Engineering (TRE) workshops at Koedoespoort. In the process, the cab at the no. 1 end was stripped of all controls and the driver's front and side windows were blanked off to have a toilet installed, thereby forfeiting the locomotive's bi-directional ability.

Since the driving cab's noise level had to be below 85 decibels, cab 2 was selected as the Class 18E driving cab primarily based on its lower noise level compared to cab 1, which is closer and more exposed to the compressor's noise and vibration. Another factor was the closer proximity of cab 2 to the low voltage switch panel. The fact that the handbrake was located in cab 2 was not a deciding factor, but was considered an additional benefit.

Most of the Class 6E1, Series 7 units which were used in this project were rebuilt to Class 18E, Series 1 locomotives. The known numbers and renumbering details are listed in the table.

Class 6E1, Series 7 units rebuilt to Class 18E as on 31 January 2014
Count	6E1 no.	Year built	18E no.	18E series	Year rebuilt	Notes
1	E1746	1977	18-159	1	2004	
2	E1747	1977	18-141	1	2004	
3	E1748	1977	18-366	1	2007	
4	E1749	1977	18-332	1	2007	ex 17E
5	E1750	1977	18-206	1	2005	
6	E1751	1977	18-390	1	2008	
7	E1752	1977	18-208	1	2005	
8	E1753	1977	18-399	1	2008	
9	E1755	1977	18-416	1	2009	TFR, ex PRASA
10	E1756	1977	18-408	1	2009	
11	E1757	1977	18-521	1	2009	
12	E1758	1977	18-407	1	2009	
13	E1759	1977	18-391	1	2008	
14	E1760	1977	18-389	1	2008	
15	E1761	1977	18-520	1	2009	
16	E1762	1977	18-607	2	2009	
17	E1763	1977	18-516	1	2009	
18	E1764	1977	18-377	1	2008	
19	E1765	1977	18-134	1	2004	
20	E1766	1977	18-398	1	2008	
21	E1767	1977	18-603	2	2009	
22	E1768	1977	18-605	2	2010	
23	E1769	1977	18-139	1	2004	
24	E1770	1977	18-335	1	2007	
25	E1771	1977	18-410	1	2009	PRASA
26	E1772	1977	18-382	1	2008	
27	E1773	1977	18-522	1	2009	
28	E1774	1977	18-385	1	2008	
29	E1775	1977	18-292	1	2006	ex 17E
30	E1776	1977	18-326	1	2007	ex 17E
31	E1777	1977	18-289	1	2006	ex 17E
32	E1779	1977	18-418	1	2009	TFR, ex PRASA
33	E1780	1977	18-107	1	2003	
34	E1781	1977	18-510	1	2009	
35	E1782	1977	18-137	1	2004	
36	E1783	1977	18-772	2	2013	
37	E1785	1977	18-165	1	2003	
38	E1786	1977	18-417	1	2009	
39	E1787	1977	18-354	1	2008	
40	E1788	1977-78	18-187	1	2005	
41	E1789	1977-78	18-361	1	2007	
42	E1790	1977-78	18-184	1	2005	ex 16-407B
43	E1791	1977-78	18-601	2	2009	
44	E1792	1977-78	18-333	1	2007	
45	E1793	1977-78	18-633	2	2010	
46	E1794	1977-78	18-514	1	2009	
47	E1795	1977-78	18-358	1	2007	
48	E1796	1977-78	18-188	1	2005	
49	E1797	1977-78	18-231	1	2005	
50	E1798	1977-78	18-500	1	2009	
51	E1799	1977-78	18-379	1	2008	
52	E1800	1977-78	18-699	2	2012	
53	E1801	1977-78	18-331	1	2007	ex 17E
54	E1802	1977-78	18-501	1	2009	
55	E1804	1977-78	18-403	1	2008	PRASA
56	E1805	1977-78	18-260	1	2006	ex 17E
57	E1806	1977-78	18-618	2	2010	
58	E1807	1977-78	18-654	2	2011	
59	E1808	1977-78	18-502	1	2009	
60	E1809	1977-78	18-612	2	2009	
61	E1810	1977-78	18-294	1	2006	ex 17E
62	E1811	1977-78	18-512	1	2009	
63	E1812	1977-78	18-649	2	2011	
64	E1814	1977-78	18-343	1	2007	
65	E1815	1977-78	18-401	1	2008	PRASA
66	E1817	1977-78	18-369	1	2007	
67	E1819	1977-78	18-402	1	2009	PRASA
68	E1820	1977-78	18-613	2	2010	
69	E1821	1977-78	18-409	1	2009	PRASA
70	E1822	1977-78	18-097	1	2003	ex 17E
71	E1823	1977-78	18-610	2	2010	
72	E1824	1977-78	18-615	2	2009	
73	E1825	1977-78	18-524	1	2009	
74	E1826	1977-78	18-344	1	2007	ex 17E
75	E1827	1977-78	18-283	1	2006	ex 17E
76	E1828	1977-78	18-413	1	2008	PRASA
77	E1829	1977-78	18-406	1	2008	PRASA
78	E1830	1977-78	18-387	1	2008	
79	E1831	1978	18-086	1	2003	
80	E1832	1978	18-307	1	2007	ex 17E
81	E1833	1978	18-365	1	2007	
82	E1834	1978	18-431	2	2013	PRASA
83	E1835	1978	18-280	1	2006	
84	E1836	1978	18-505	1	2009	
85	E1837	1978	18-233	1	2005	
86	E1838	1978	18-317	1	2007	
87	E1839	1978	18-625	2	2010	
88	E1840	1978	18-338	1	2007	ex 16-409A
89	E1841	1978	18-339	1	2007	ex 16-409B
90	E1842	1978	18-135	1	2004	
91	E1843	1978	18-270	1	2006	ex 17E
92	E1844	1978	18-725	2	2013	
93	E1845	1978	18-626	2	2010	
94	E1846	1978	18-359	1	2007	ex 16-404A
95	E1847	1978	18-360	1	2007	ex 16-404B
96	E1848	1978	18-264	1	2006	ex 16-405A
97	E1849	1978	18-265	1	2006	ex 16-405B
98	E1850	1978	18-392	1	2008	ex 16-410A
99	E1851	1978	18-393	1	2008	ex 16-410B
100	E1853	1978	18-368	1	2007	
101	E1854	1978	18-133	1	2004	
102	E1855	1978	18-779	2	2013	c. 2013
103	E1856	1978	18-511	1	2009	
104	E1857	1978	18-412	1	2008	PRASA
105	E1860	1978	18-138	1	2004	
106	E1861	1978	18-342	1	2007	
107	E1862	1978	18-692	2	2012	
108	E1863	1978-79	18-363	1	2007	
109	E1864	1978-79	18-364	1	2007	
110	E1865	1978-79	18-523	1	2009	
111	E1866	1978-79	18-691	2	2012	
112	E1867	1978-79	18-730	2	2013	
113	E1868	1978-79	18-414	1	2008	PRASA
114	E1869	1978-79	18-701	2	2012	
115	E1871	1978-79	18-090	1	2003	
116	E1872	1979	18-396	1	2008	
117	E1873	1979	18-213	1	2005	
118	E1874	1979	18-509	1	2009	
119	E1875	1979	18-356	1	2007	
120	E1876	1979	18-183	1	2005	
121	E1877	1979	18-606	2	2009	
122	E1878	1979	18-198	1	2005	
123	E1879	1979	18-374	1	2007	
124	E1880	1979	18-513	1	2009	
125	E1881	1979	18-318	1	2007	
126	E1882	1979	18-609	2	2009	
127	E1883	1979	18-314	1	2007	
128	E1884	1979	18-616	2	2010	
129	E1885	1979	18-080	1	2003	
130	E1886	1979	18-362	1	2007	
131	E1887	1979	18-624	2	2010	
132	E1888	1979	18-370	1	2007	
133	E1889	1979	18-266	1	2006	
134	E1890	1979	18-631	2	2010	
135	E1891	1979	18-515	1	2009	
136	E1892	1979	18-371	1	2007	
137	E1893	1979	18-161	1	2005	
138	E1894	1979	18-205	1	2005	
139	E1895	1979	18-353	1	2007	

== Liveries ==
The whole series was delivered in the SAR Gulf Red livery with signal red cowcatchers, yellow whiskers and with the number plates on the sides mounted on three-stripe yellow wings. In the 1990s many of the Series 6 units began to be repainted in the Spoornet orange livery with a yellow and blue chevron pattern on the cowcatchers. Several later received the Spoornet maroon livery. In the late 1990s at least two were repainted in the Spoornet blue livery with outline numbers on the sides. In the Passenger Rail Agency of South Africa (PRASA) era after 2008, at least one was repainted in the Shosholoza Meyl purple livery.

== Illustration ==
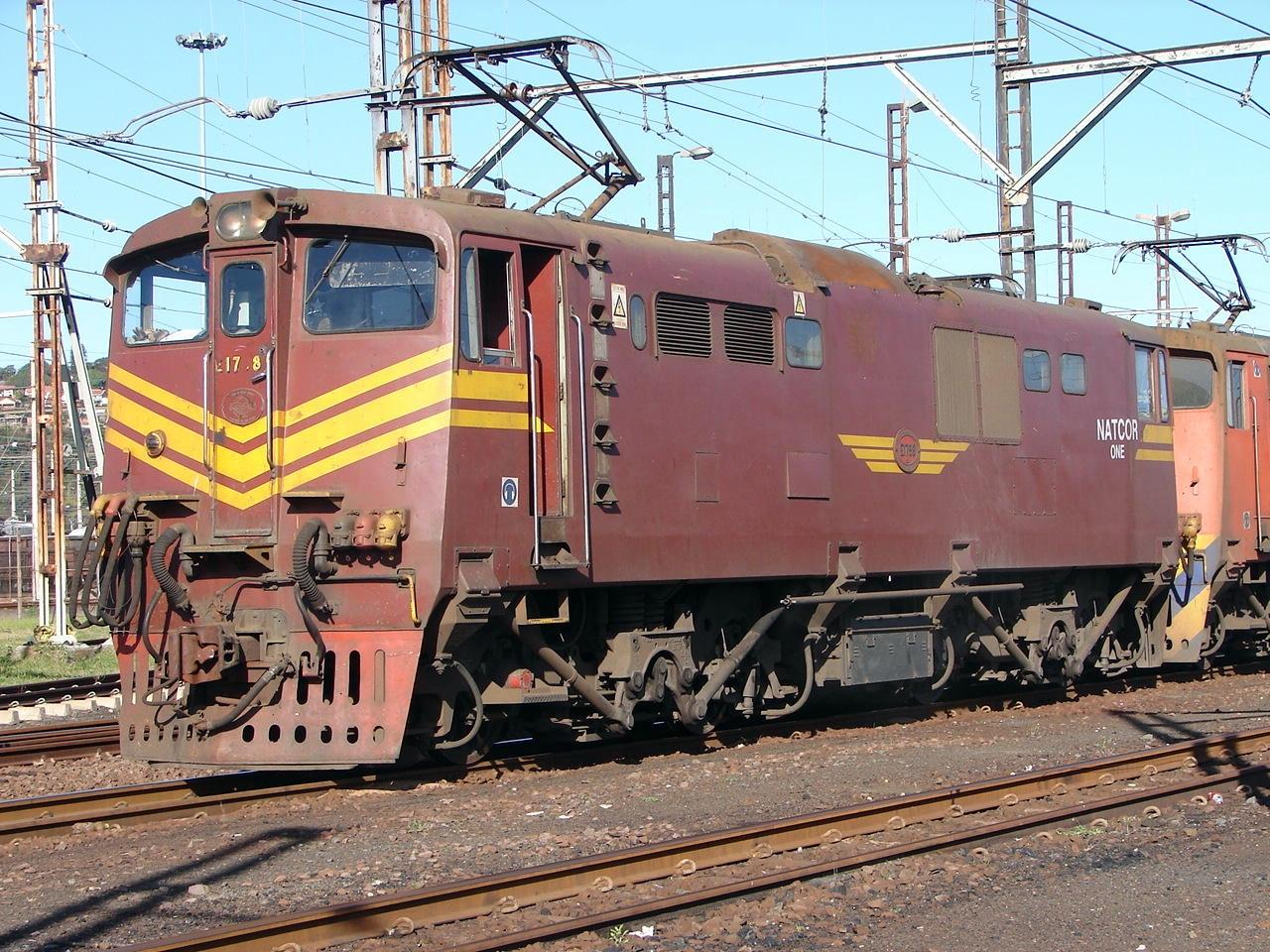
No. E1798 in SAR Gulf Red & whiskers livery at Bayhead, Durban, 8 August 2007

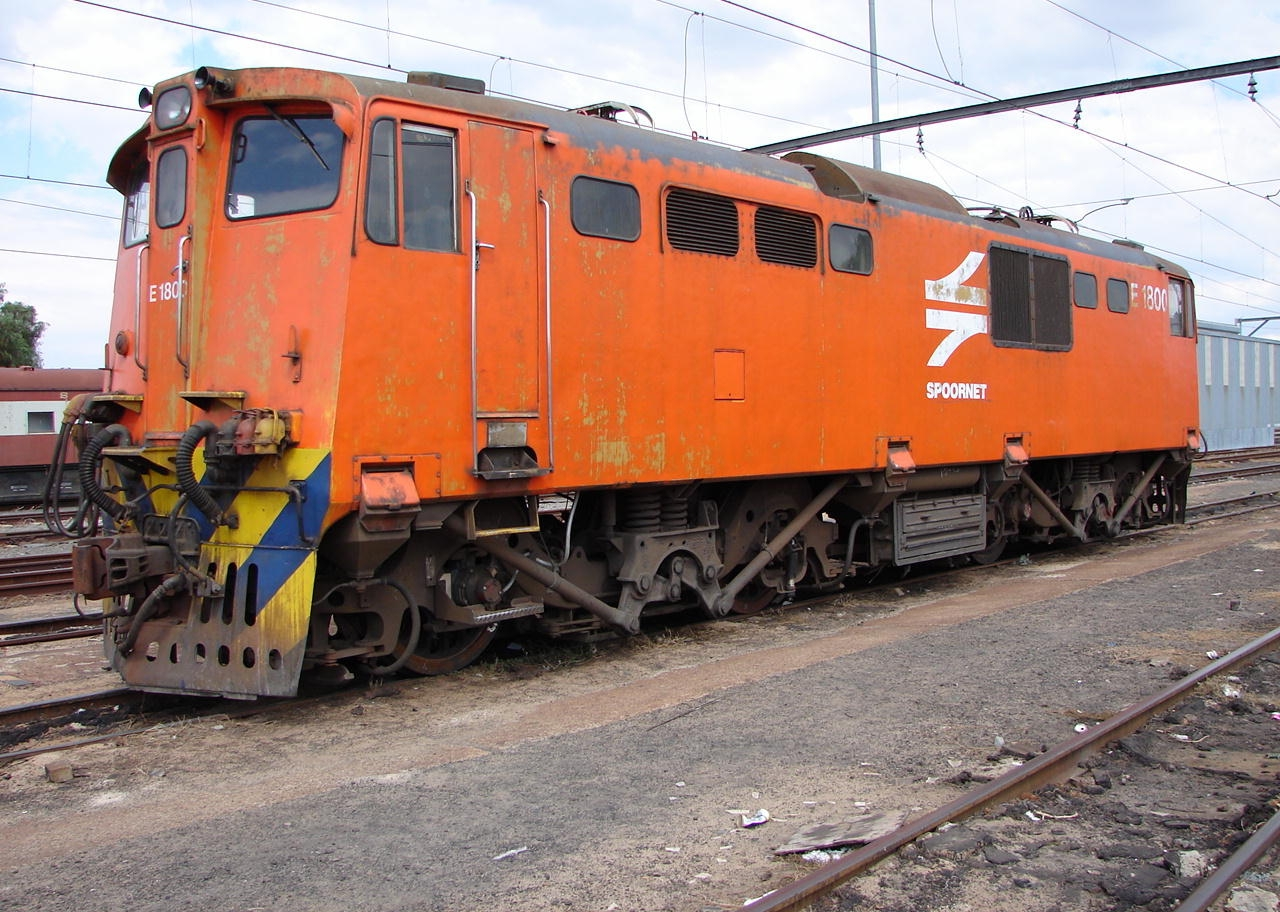
No. E1800 in Spoornet orange livery at Beaufort West, Western Cape, 4 April 2006

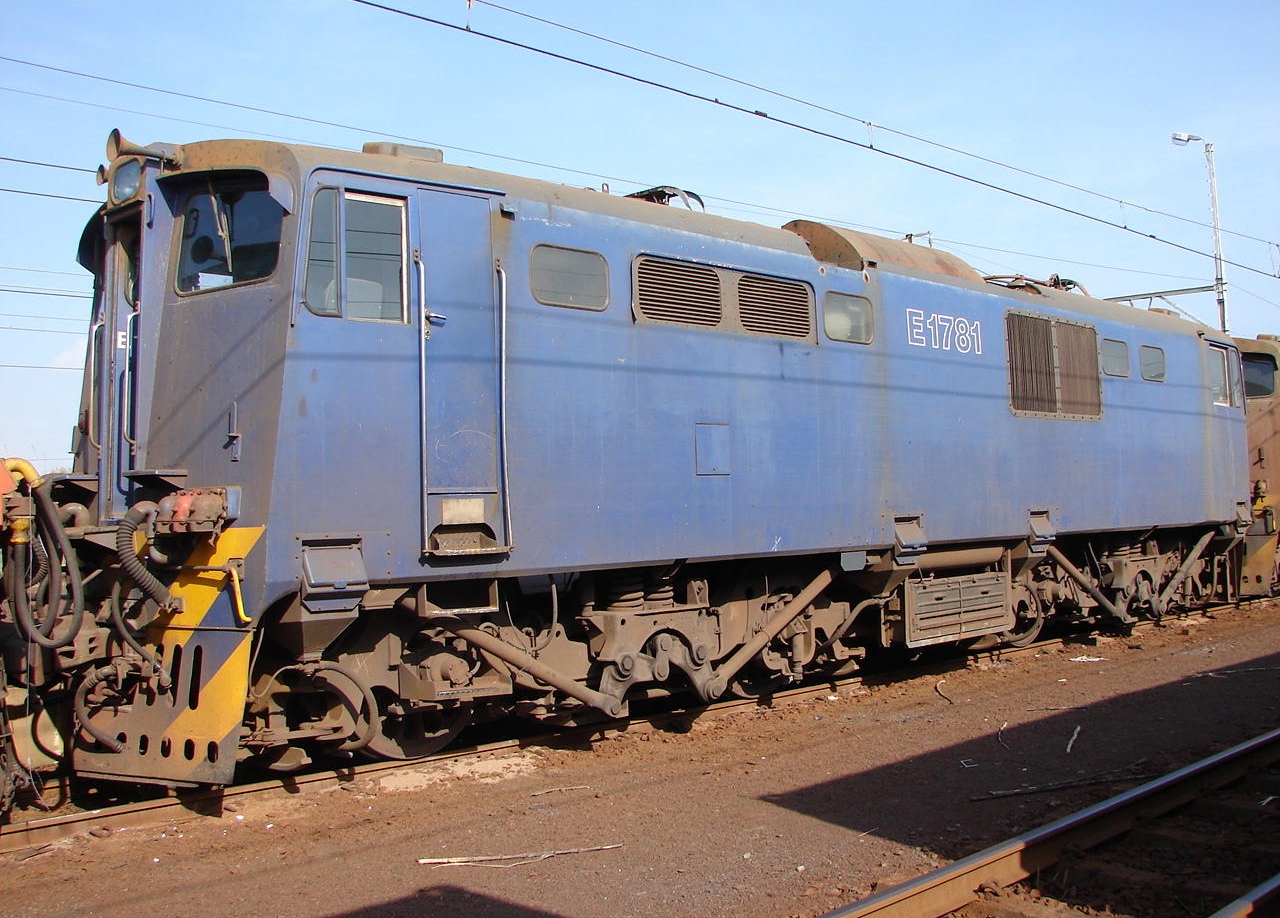
No. E1781 in Spoornet blue livery with outline numbers at Empangeni, 14 August 2007

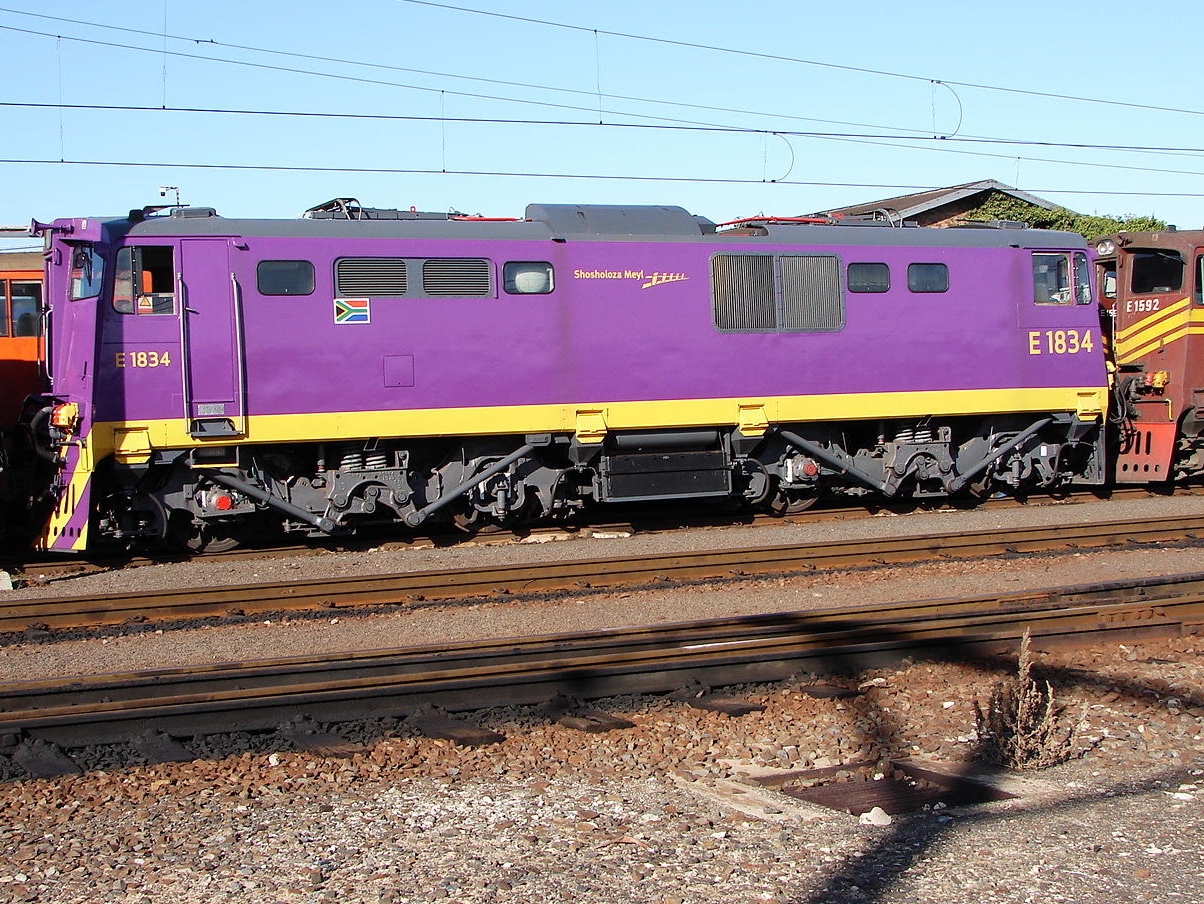
No. E1834 in PRASA's Shosholoza Meyl livery at Bellville Depot, 15 May 2010
