= John Kemp (cricketer, born 1928) =

South African cricketer (1928–2010)

Personal information
- Full name: John Miles Kemp
- Born: 14 March 1928; Queenstown, South Africa
- Died: 14 June 2010 (aged 82); Cathcart, South Africa
- Relatives: JW Kemp (son); Justin Kemp (grandson)
- Source: Cricinfo, 6 December 2020

John Kemp (14 March 1928 – 14 June 2010) was a South African cricketer. He played in one first-class match for Border in 1947/48. His son John Wesley Kemp also played for Border, and his grandson Justin Kemp played international cricket for South Africa.

== See also ==
- List of Border representative cricketers
