= Smangaliso Mkhatshwa =

South African politician

Smangaliso Mkhatshwa is a South African politician.

== History ==
He described an experience as follows:

I was once arrested by the security police of the apartheid regime. I was tortured for two full days and nights non-stop. I was stripped naked, I was handcuffed behind my back, my ankles were chained, I was blindfolded, I was beaten up, I was insulted, there was a gun that was shot above my own head, I suppose to scare me, I was spat at, all sorts of things were done, and of course electric shocks..."

— (ABC Radio National 2004)

== See also ==
- 1977 in South Africa
