= Dave Callaghan =

South African cricketer (born 1965)

Personal information
- Full name: David John Callaghan
- Born: 1 February 1965 (age 61); Queenstown, Eastern Cape
- Batting: Right-handed
- Bowling: Right-arm medium
- Relatives: Justin Kemp (cousin)

International information
- National side: South Africa (1992–2000)
- ODI debut (cap 22): 7 December 1992 v India
- Last ODI: 14 April 2000 v Australia

Career statistics
| Competition | ODI | FC | LA |
|---|---|---|---|
| Matches | 29 | 146 | 216 |
| Runs scored | 493 | 7,730 | 5,304 |
| Batting average | 25.94 | 36.12 | 32.74 |
| 100s/50s | 1/0 | 18/37 | 2/33 |
| Top score | 169* | 171 | 169* |
| Balls bowled | 444 | 8,651 | 5,643 |
| Wickets | 10 | 126 | 147 |
| Bowling average | 36.50 | 29.07 | 29.00 |
| 5 wickets in innings | 0 | 3 | 0 |
| 10 wickets in match | 0 | 1 | 0 |
| Best bowling | 3/32 | 5/24 | 4/31 |
| Catches/stumpings | 6/0 | 113/0 | 48/0 |
- Source: Cricinfo, 14 April 2017

David John Callaghan (born 1 February 1965) is a former South African international cricketer. Despite there being a distance of eight years between his first and last One Day International, Callaghan played 29 times for South Africa. He was born at Queenstown, Eastern Cape.

== International career ==
The defining moment of his international career was an innings of 169 not out, made against New Zealand at Centurion during the Mandela Trophy in 1994. Opening the batting, Callaghan made 169 off 143 balls and hit 4 sixes. This happens to be the highest score in ODIs by a batsman, who have scored only one 50-plus knock in their career. He also took his career best figures of 3 for 32 and was the obvious choice for man of the match. Callaghan's innings was his first after recovering from testicular cancer.

In February 2020, he was named in South Africa's squad for the Over-50s Cricket World Cup in South Africa. However, the tournament was cancelled during the third round of matches due to the coronavirus pandemic.
