= Justin Kemp =

South African cricketer

Personal information
- Full name: Justin Miles Kemp
- Born: 2 October 1977 (age 49); Queenstown, Cape Province, South Africa
- Nickname: Kempie
- Batting: Right-handed
- Bowling: Right-arm medium
- Role: All-rounder

International information
- National side: South Africa (2001–2007)
- Test debut (cap 279): 20 January 2001 v Sri Lanka
- Last Test: 16 December 2005 v Australia
- ODI debut (cap 63): 14 January 2001 v Sri Lanka
- Last ODI: 23 October 2007 v Pakistan
- T20I debut (cap 5): 21 October 2005 v New Zealand
- Last T20I: 20 September 2007 v India

Domestic team information
- Years: Team
- 1996/97–2002/03: Eastern Province
- 2003: Worcestershire
- 2003/04–2004/05: Northerns
- 2003/04–2006/07: Titans
- 2005–2009: Kent
- 2007/08–2015/16: Cape Cobras
- 2010–2011: Chennai Super Kings
- 2012/13: Western Province
- 2013: Antigua Hawksbills

Head coaching information
- Years: Team
- 2026-present: Pindiz

Career statistics
Competition	Test	ODI	FC	LA
Matches	4	85	168	304
Runs scored	80	1,512	7,696	6,543
Batting average	13.33	31.50	34.66	34.25
100s/50s	0/1	1/10	16/34	3/43
Top score	55	100*	188	107*
Balls bowled	479	1,303	16,135	8,012
Wickets	9	32	268	214
Bowling average	24.66	31.71	27.31	29.54
5 wickets in innings	0	0	7	3
10 wickets in match	0	0	0	0
Best bowling	3/33	3/20	6/56	6/20
Catches/stumpings	3/–	33/–	237/–	131/–
- Source: ESPNcricinfo, 1 July 2025

Justin Miles Kemp (born 2 October 1977) is a South African former international cricketer who played all formats of the game for South Africa.

Kemp is the 3rd generation cricketer to play first class cricket, his grandfather John Miles Kemp played a single match for Border in 1947–48, while his father John Wesley Kemp made three appearances for the same province in 1975–76 and 1976–77. His cousin is former South African international David Callaghan.

== International career ==
Kemp made his International debut in an ODI against Sri Lanka on 14 January 2001. He made his Test debut a week later also against Sri Lanka. He was taken on the tour of the West Indies in the 2000/2001 season but he did not score many runs and was involved in a controversy when he admitted smoking marijuana with 6 South African players. He was selected for eight more One day games but again he disappointed and was dropped. He was out of the South African team for nearly three years until he was selected to play in the home series against England. In this series Kemp impressed with his big hitting with him smashing 80 runs from 50 balls in an innings that included 7 sixes. Following his performances he was picked for the series against Zimbabwe and in the match at Durban he hit 53 from 21 balls in an innings that included 5 sixes. He was then taken on his second tour of the West Indies where he made an impressive 65 at Trinidad.

He was then selected to represent Africa in the Afro-Asian Cup although he batted lower down the order and struggled. In the South African season of 2005/2006 he showed that he is a match winner when he blasted 73 from 64 at Bloemfontein. Kemp then went on his first tour of India where he showed he was able to bat on slower pitches. He went on the South African tour of Australia where he made a rare appearance in a Test Match when he and Jacques Rudolph formed a partnership that rescued a draw for South Africa at Perth. He was not picked for the second Test and has not been picked in a Test Match since. He struggled in the VB Series that involved Sri Lanka, Australia and South Africa with him averaging just 17.00. He quickly returned to form when Australia toured South Africa as he made 51 from 41 balls at Newlands Cape Town.

He was selected in South Africa's squad for the 2006 ICC Champions Trophy in India where he showed he is more than just a big hitter when he made 64 from 110 balls in a partnership with Mark Boucher where he along with Mark Boucher set the record for the highest 6th wicket stand in ICC Champions Trophy(131) 26 November 2006, in the third ODI of the series between India and South Africa, his team were at 137 for 7 when Kemp came in and smashed his way to his maiden ODI century with the help of Andrew Hall. Together they put on a world record 8th wicket stand of 138 and took their score to 274, with Kemp named Man of the Match. He also showed that he is a useful medium pace bowler when he took three wickets at St George's Park Port Elizabeth. He was selected in the 30-man provisional squad for the 2007 Cricket World Cup.

== Indian Cricket League ==
In 2008, Kemp joined the rebel Indian Cricket League, which was not recognised by any cricket board or the ICC, thereby ending his international career with South Africa. In the ICL, Kemp played for the Hyderabad Heroes team.

== County Cricket ==
In 2003, Kemp played in England for Worcestershire, with a best bowling return of 5/48 in the County Championship against Glamorgan in June, and a top score of 90 against Hampshire in the same competition in September.

On 20 March 2008, the ECB banned Kemp and four other Kolpak players because of their involvement in the ICL. The decision was subsequently overturned, allowing Kemp to play for Kent, with whom he had a two-year contract. However, changes to the Kolpak regulations meant Kemp could not return to the county for 2010.

== Indian Premier League ==
In 2010, Kemp joined the Chennai Super Kings franchise of Indian Premier League for $100,000.
