= John Kemp (baseball) =

Professional baseball player

- Outfielder
- Batted: Right

Negro league baseball debut
- 1920, for the Birmingham Black Barons

Last appearance
- 1928, for the Memphis Red Sox

Teams
- Birmingham Black Barons (1920, 1923); Memphis Red Sox (1924–1925, 1928)

John Kemp was a Negro league outfielder in the 1920s.

Kemp made his Negro leagues debut in 1920 with the Birmingham Black Barons, and played for the club again in 1923. He went on to play three seasons with the Memphis Red Sox, where he finished his career in 1928.
