= Khoto Sesinyi =

Mosotho footballer (born 1977)

Personal information
- Full name: Khoto Sesinyi
- Date of birth: 6 March 1977 (age 49)
- Place of birth: Lesotho
- Position: Left back

Team information
- Current team: Lesotho Prison Service

Senior career*
Years	Team	Apps	(Gls)
2003–	Lesotho Prison Service		

International career^{‡}
2003–	Lesotho	17	(0)
- * Club domestic league appearances and goals ‡ National team caps and goals as of 08:26, 22 December 2009 (UTC)

Khoto Sesinyi (born 6 March 1977) is a Mosotho footballer who currently plays as a defender for Lesotho Prison Service. He also plays for the Lesotho national football team, winning 17 caps since 2003.
