= John Kemp (Australian footballer) =

Australian rules footballer

Personal information
- Full name: John Kemp
- Born: 6 June 1944 (age 82)
- Height: 180 cm (5 ft 11 in)
- Weight: 75 kg (165 lb)

Playing career^{1}
| Years | Club | Games (Goals) |
| 1965–66 | Carlton | 6 (0) |
- ^{1} Playing statistics correct to the end of 1966.

John Kemp (born 6 June 1944) is a former Australian rules footballer who played with Carlton in the Victorian Football League (VFL).
