= South African Class 17E =

Class of South African electric locomotives

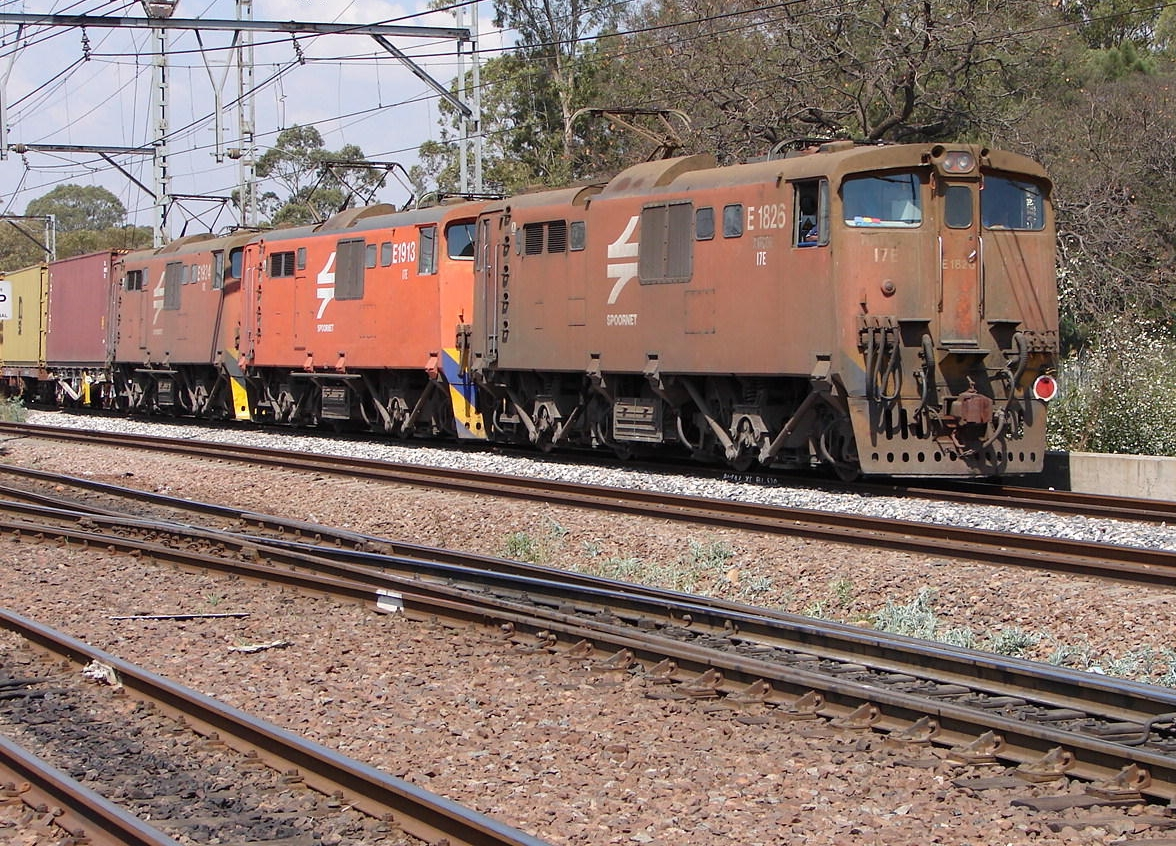
- E1826 at Capital Park, Pretoria, Gauteng, 28 September 2006
Type and origin
- Power type: Electric
- Designer: Union Carriage & Wagon
- Builder: Union Carriage & Wagon
- Model: UCW 6E1
- Build date: 1977–1982
- Total produced: 139
- Rebuilder: Transnet Rail Engineering
- Rebuild date: 2002–2007
- Number rebuilt: 136 to Class 18E, Series 1
Specifications
- Configuration
  - AAR: B-B
  - UIC: Bo'Bo'
  - Commonwealth: Bo-Bo
- Gauge: 3 ft 6 in (1,067 mm) Cape gauge
- Wheel diameter: 1,220 mm (48.03 in)
- Wheelbase: 11,279 mm (37 ft 0 in)
  - Bogie: 3,430 mm (11 ft 3 in)
- Pivot centres: 7,849 mm (25 ft 9 in)
- Panto shoes: 6,972 mm (22 ft 10 1/2 in)
- Length
  - Over couplers: 15,494 mm (50 ft 10 in)
  - Over body: 14,631 mm (48 ft 0 in)
- Width: 2,896 mm (9 ft 6 in)
- Height
  - Pantograph: 4,089 mm (13 ft 5 in)
  - Body height: 3,937 mm (12 ft 11 in)
- Axle load: 22,226 kg (49,000 lb)
- Adhesive weight: 88,904 kg (196,000 lb)
- Loco weight: 88,904 kg (196,000 lb)
- Electric system/s: 3 kV DC catenary
- Current pickup(s): Pantographs
- Traction motors: Four AEI-283AY
  - Rating 1 hour: 623 kW (835 hp)
  - Continuous: 563 kW (755 hp)
- Gear ratio: 18:67
- Loco brake: Air & Regenerative
- Train brakes: Air & Vacuum
- Couplers: AAR knuckle
Performance figures
- Maximum speed: 113 km/h (70 mph)
- Power output
  - 1 hour: 2,492 kW (3,342 hp)
  - Continuous: 2,252 kW (3,020 hp)
- Tractive effort
  - Starting: 311 kN (70,000 lbf)
  - 1 hour: 221 kN (50,000 lbf)
  - Continuous: 193 kN (43,000 lbf) @ 40 km/h (25 mph)
Career
- Operators: Spoornet
- Class: Class 17E
- Number in class: 139
- Numbers: See the table
- First run: 1993
- Last run: 2007

The Spoornet Class 17E of 1993 was a South African electric locomotive.

During 1993 and 1994, Spoornet modified several Class 6E1, Series 7, 8 and 9 locomotives to improve their braking and traction reliability for service on the Natal mainline. These modified locomotives were reclassified to Class 17E.

== Manufacturer ==
The 3 kV DC Class 6E1 electric locomotive was built for the South African Railways (SAR) by Union Carriage & Wagon (UCW) in Nigel, Transvaal, with electrical equipment supplied by the General Electric Company (GEC). UCW did not allocate works numbers to the locomotives which it built for the SAR, but used the SAR unit numbers for their record keeping.

== Characteristics ==
=== Bogies ===
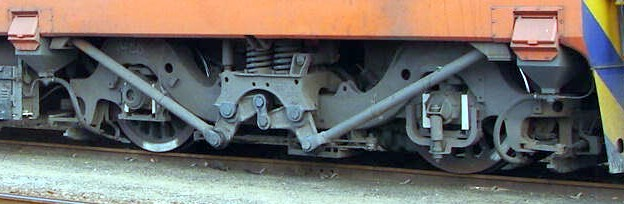
Class 6E1 Series 2 to 11 bogies

The Class 6E1 was built with sophisticated traction linkages on their bogies. Together with the locomotive's electronic wheel-slip detection system, these traction struts, mounted between the linkages on the bogies and the locomotive body and colloquially referred to as grasshopper legs, ensured the maximum transfer of power to the rails without causing wheel-slip by reducing the adhesion of the leading bogie and increasing that of the trailing bogie by as much as 15% upon starting. This feature was controlled by electronic wheel-slip detection devices and an electric weight transfer relay which reduced the anchor current to the leading bogie by as much as 50A in notches 2 to 16.

=== Brakes ===
The locomotive itself used air brakes, but it was equipped to operate trains with air or vacuum brakes. While hauling a vacuum braked train, the locomotive's air brake system would be disabled and the train would be controlled by using the train brakes alone to slow down and stop. While hauling an air braked train, on the other hand, the locomotive brakes would engage along with the train brakes. While working either type of train downgrade, the locomotive's regenerative braking system would also work in conjunction with the train brakes.

When the locomotive was stopped, the air brakes on both bogies were applied together. The handbrake or parking brake, located in cab no. 2, only operated on the unit's last axle, or no. 7 and 8 wheels.

=== Orientation ===
These dual cab locomotives had a roof access ladder on one side only, just to the right of the cab access door. The roof access ladder end was marked as the no. 2 end. A corridor along the centre of the locomotive connected the cabs, which were identical apart from the fact that the handbrake was located in cab 2. A pantograph hook stick was stowed in a tube mounted below the lower edge of the locomotive body on the roof access ladder side.

== Modification to Class 17E ==
Class 17E locomotives were modified and reclassified from Class 6E1, Series 7, 8 or 9 locomotives during 1993 and 1994. Key modifications included improved regenerative braking and wheel-slip control to improve their reliability on the steep grades and curves of the KwaZulu-Natal mainline.

A stumbling block was that the regeneration equipment at many of the sub-stations along the route was unreliable and since there was no guarantee that another train would be in the same section to absorb the regenerated energy, there was always the risk that line voltage could exceed 4.1 kV, which would make either the sub-station or the locomotive trip out. As a result, the subsequently rebuilt Class 18E locomotives were not equipped with regenerative braking.

Unlike the Class 16E locomotives, which were renumbered and reclassified but otherwise unmodified semi-permanently coupled pairs of Class 6E1, Series 3 to Series 9 locomotives that merely had their no. 1 end cabs abandoned in terms of maintenance, the Class 17Es retained their original unit numbers after reclassification, but with a "17E" marking applied below the locomotive's unit number behind the driver's side window.

Apart from the "17E" markings, they were visually indistinguishable from unmodified Class 6E1s. Those in SAR Gulf Red and yellow whiskers livery that still carried number plates even still showed "6E1" on the plates. Altogether 139 Class 6E1 locomotives were modified to Class 17E, of which 14 were Series 7, 55 Series 8 and 70 Series 9.

== Rebuilding to Class 18E ==
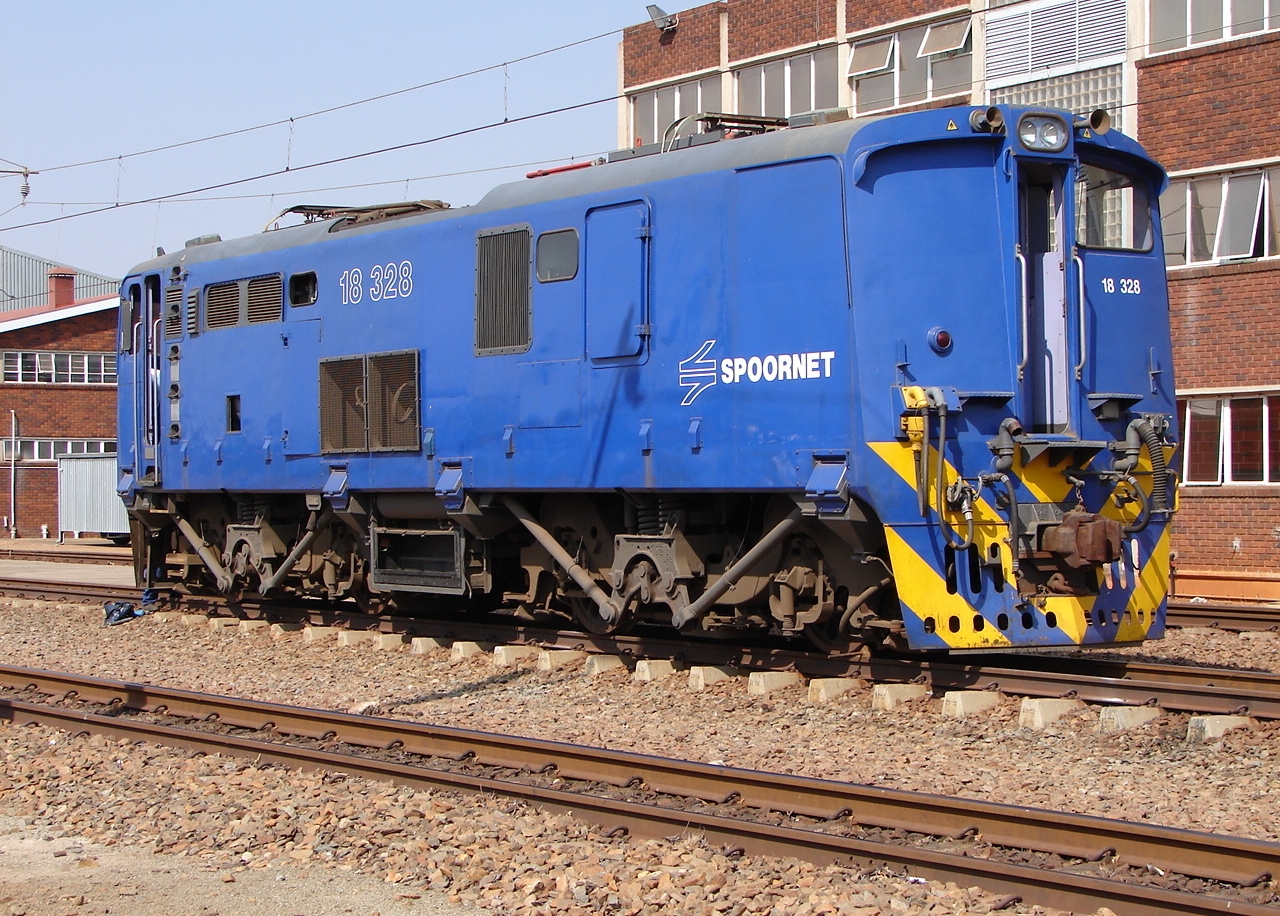
Cab 1 of Class 18E no. 18-328, ex Class 17E no. E2071, Sentrarand, 22 September 2009

In 2000, Spoornet began a project to rebuild Series 2 to 11 Class 6E1 locomotives to Class 18E, Series 1 and Series 2 at the Transnet Rail Engineering (TRE) workshops at Koedoespoort. In the process the cab at the no. 1 end was stripped of all controls and the driver's front and side windows were blanked off to have a toilet installed, thereby forfeiting the locomotive's bi-directional ability.

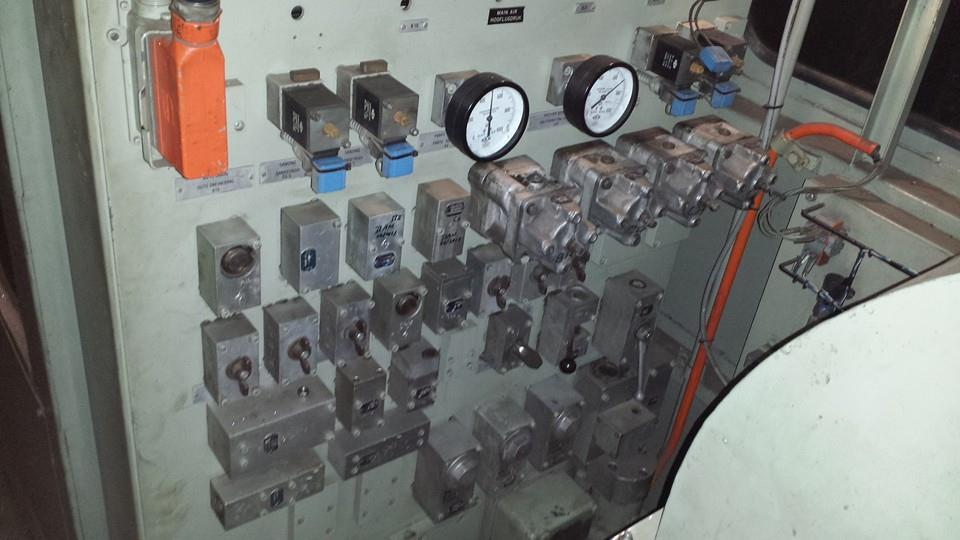
Brake rack in Class 18E no. 18-089

Since the driving cab's noise level had to be below 85 decibels, cab 2 was selected as the Class 18E driving cab, primarily based on its lower noise level compared to cab 1 which was closer and more exposed to the compressor's noise and vibration. Another factor was the closer proximity of cab 2 to the low voltage switch panel. The fact that the handbrake was located in cab 2 was not a deciding factor, but was considered an additional benefit.

While the earlier Class 6E1, Series 2 to 7 locomotives had been built with a brake system which consisted of various valves connected to each other with pipes and commonly referred to as a "bicycle frame" brake system, the Class 6E1, Series 8 to 11 locomotives were built with an air equipment frame brake system, commonly referred to as a brake rack. Since the design of the rebuilt Class 18E locomotives included the same brake rack, the rebuilding project was begun with the newer series 8 to 11 locomotives to reduce the overall cost of rebuilding.

Between 2002 and 2007, all but three of the Class 17Es were rebuilt to Class 18E, Series 1. The exceptions are numbers E1778, E1803 and E2035, which are presumed to have been scrapped. The table lists their Class 6E1 series and numbers, Class 18E numbers and year of rebuilding.

Class 17E units rebuilt to Class 18E
Count	17E no.	6E1 series	Year built	18E no.	Year rebuilt
1	E1749	7	1977	18-332	2007
2	E1775	7	1977	18-292	2006
3	E1776	7	1977	18-326	2007
4	E1777	7	1977	18-289	2006
5	E1801	7	1977–78	18-331	2007
6	E1805	7	1977–78	18-260	2006
7	E1810	7	1977–78	18-294	2006
8	E1822	7	1977–78	18-097	2003
9	E1826	7	1977–78	18-344	2007
10	E1827	7	1977–78	18-283	2006
11	E1832	7	1978	18-307	2007
12	E1843	7	1978	18-270	2006
13	E1900	8	1979	18-262	2006
14	E1901	8	1979	18-298	2006
15	E1904	8	1979	18-087	2003
16	E1905	8	1979	18-311	2007
17	E1906	8	1979	18-284	2006
18	E1907	8	1979	18-330	2007
19	E1908	8	1979	18-288	2006
20	E1909	8	1979	18-061	2002
21	E1910	8	1979	18-295	2006
22	E1913	8	1979	18-340	2007
23	E1921	8	1979–80	18-341	2007
24	E1922	8	1979–80	18-306	2007
25	E1924	8	1979–80	18-334	2007
26	E1931	8	1980	18-202	2005
27	E1933	8	1980	18-320	2007
28	E1934	8	1980	18-094	2003
29	E1935	8	1980	18-018	2002
30	E1936	8	1980	18-274	2006
31	E1937	8	1980	18-216	2005
32	E1938	8	1980	18-293	2006
33	E1939	8	1980	18-203	2005
34	E1940	8	1980	18-084	2003
35	E1944	8	1980	18-197	2005
36	E1945	8	1980	18-207	2005
37	E1946	8	1980	18-062	2002
38	E1947	8	1980	18-290	2006
39	E1949	8	1980	18-064	2002
40	E1962	8	1980	18-070	2003
41	E1964	8	1980	18-329	2007
42	E1965	8	1980	18-316	2007
43	E1966	8	1980	18-178	2005
44	E1967	8	1980	18-263	2006
45	E1968	8	1980	18-222	2005
46	E1969	8	1980	18-201	2005
47	E1971	8	1980	18-269	2006
48	E1976	8	1980	18-256	2006
49	E1979	8	1980	18-337	2007
50	E1982	8	1980	18-272	2006
51	E1983	8	1980	18-296	2006
52	E1984	8	1980–81	18-226	2005
53	E1985	8	1980–81	18-312	2007
54	E1986	8	1980–81	18-215	2005
55	E1987	8	1980–81	18-324	2007
56	E1989	8	1981	18-303	2006
57	E1990	8	1981	18-310	2007
58	E1991	8	1981	18-225	2005
59	E1992	8	1981	18-278	2006
60	E1993	8	1981	18-336	2007
61	E1994	8	1981	18-305	2006
62	E1995	8	1981	18-279	2006
63	E1996	8	1981	18-315	2007
64	E1997	8	1981	18-156	2004
65	E1998	8	1981	18-237	2006
66	E1999	8	1981	18-065	2002
67	E2000	8	1981	18-309	2007
68	E2003	9	1981–82	18-285	2006
69	E2005	9	1981–82	18-308	2007
70	E2006	9	1981–82	18-325	2007
71	E2007	9	1981–82	18-236	2005
72	E2008	9	1981–82	18-275	2006
73	E2011	9	1981–82	18-255	2006
74	E2012	9	1981–82	18-273	2006
75	E2015	9	1981–82	18-261	2006
76	E2016	9	1981–82	18-232	2005
77	E2017	9	1981–82	18-299	2006
78	E2018	9	1981–82	18-249	2006
79	E2019	9	1981–82	18-252	2006
80	E2020	9	1981–82	18-194	2005
81	E2022	9	1981–82	18-211	2005
82	E2023	9	1981–82	18-267	2006
83	E2024	9	1981–82	18-259	2006
84	E2025	9	1981–82	18-193	2005
85	E2026	9	1981–82	18-196	2005
86	E2027	9	1981–82	18-319	2007
87	E2028	9	1981–82	18-210	2005
88	E2029	9	1981–82	18-327	2007
89	E2030	9	1981–82	18-223	2005
90	E2031	9	1981–82	18-304	2006
91	E2032	9	1981–82	18-301	2006
92	E2033	9	1981–82	18-246	2006
93	E2034	9	1981–82	18-254	2006
94	E2036	9	1981–82	18-247	2006
95	E2037	9	1981–82	18-037	2002
96	E2038	9	1981–82	18-074	2003
97	E2039	9	1981–82	18-230	2005
98	E2040	9	1981–82	18-241	2006
99	E2041	9	1981–82	18-276	2006
100	E2042	9	1981–82	18-227	2005
101	E2043	9	1981–82	18-234	2005
102	E2044	9	1982	18-219	2005
103	E2045	9	1982	18-238	2005
104	E2046	9	1982	18-271	2006
105	E2047	9	1982	18-268	2006
106	E2048	9	1982	18-258	2006
107	E2050	9	1982	18-239	2006
108	E2051	9	1982	18-229	2005
109	E2052	9	1982	18-218	2005
110	E2053	9	1982	18-093	2003
111	E2054	9	1982	18-257	2006
112	E2055	9	1982	18-028	2002
113	E2056	9	1982	18-079	2003
114	E2057	9	1982	18-240	2005
115	E2058	9	1982	18-253	2006
116	E2059	9	1982	18-321	2007
117	E2060	9	1982	18-250	2006
118	E2062	9	1982	18-282	2006
119	E2063	9	1982	18-242	2006
120	E2064	9	1982	18-281	2006
121	E2065	9	1982	18-192	2005
122	E2066	9	1982	18-212	2005
123	E2067	9	1982	18-245	2006
124	E2068	9	1982	18-302	2006
125	E2069	9	1982	18-291	2006
126	E2070	9	1982	18-224	2005
127	E2071	9	1982	18-328	2007
128	E2073	9	1982	18-243	2006
129	E2075	9	1982	18-073	2003
130	E2076	9	1982	18-228	2005
131	E2077	9	1982	18-244	2006
132	E2079	9	1982	18-127	2004
133	E2081	9	1982	18-251	2006
134	E2082	9	1982	18-235	2005
135	E2084	9	1982	18-217	2005
136	E2085	9	1982	18-214	2005

== Illustration ==
The main picture shows Class 17E no. E1826, ex Class 6E1, Series 7, at Capital Park in Pretoria on 28 September 2006. The "17E" markings below the locomotive numbers on this and the following picture were the only means to visually distinguish Class 17E locomotives from unmodified Class 6E1 locomotives.

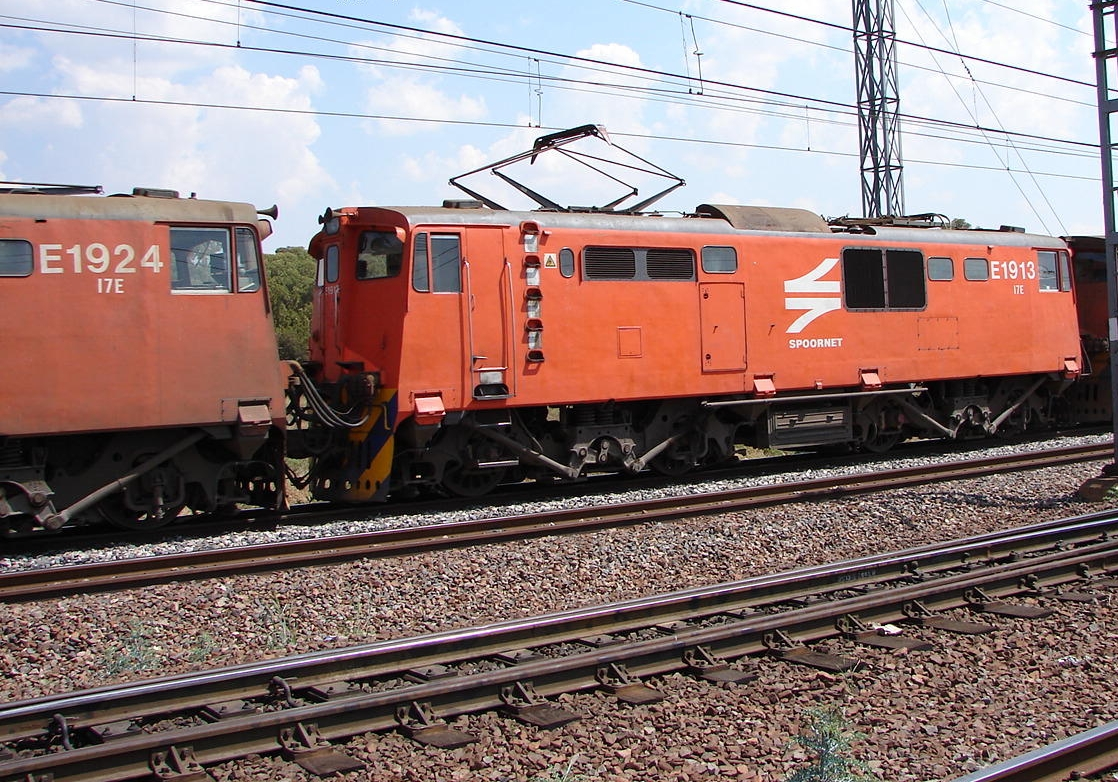
Class 17E no. E1913, ex Class 6E1, Series 8, at Capital Park, Pretoria, 28 September 2006
