= Union Carriage & Wagon =

South African railway vehicle manufacturer

Coordinates: 26.398421°S 28.485672°E

Alstom Ubunye
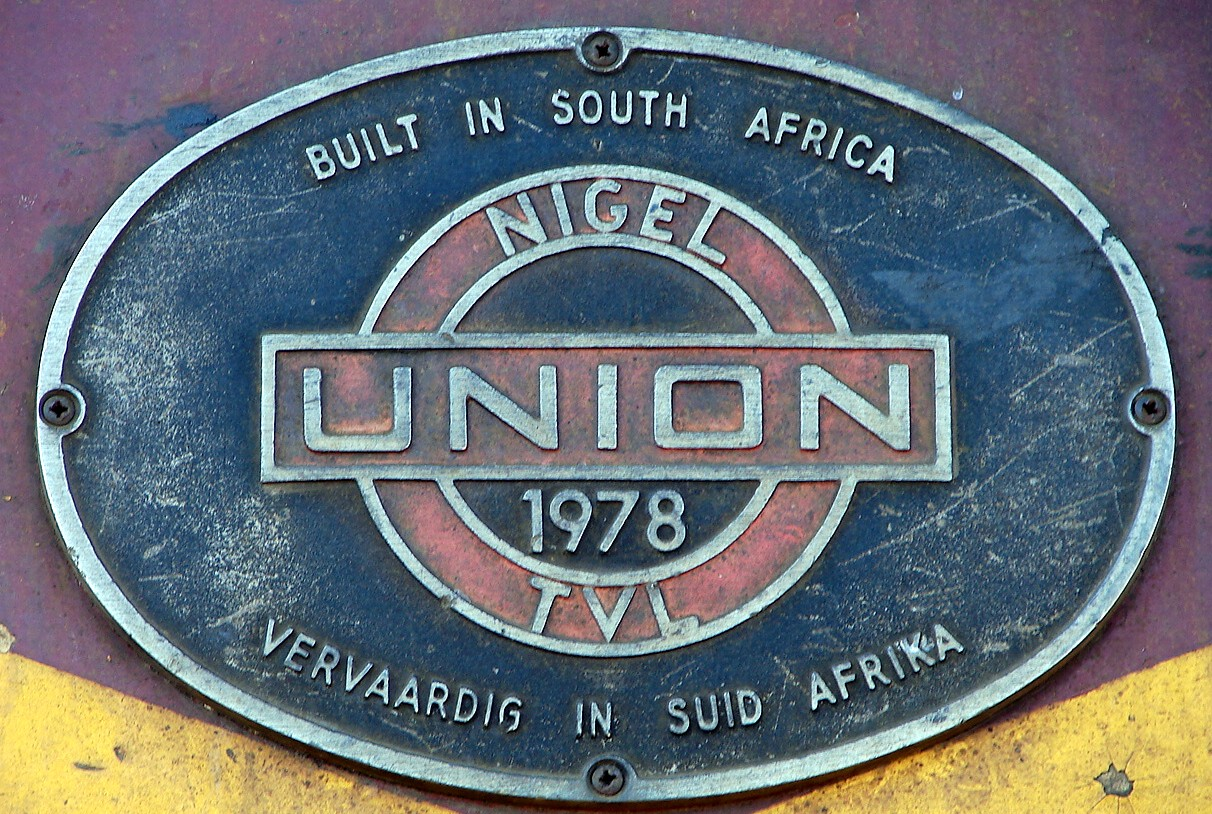
- Builder's plate on a South African Class 6E1, Series 7
- Formerly: Union Carriage & Wagon (1957–2016)
- Industry: Rolling stock manufacturing
- Founded: 1957; 69 years ago
- Founder: Commonwealth Engineering
- Headquarters: Nigel, Ekurhuleni, South Africa
- Owner: Commuter Transport and Locomotive Engineering (CTLE) consortium; Alstom (51%); Commuter Transport Engineering (CTE); Industrial Development Corporation (IDC)
- Website: www.alstom.com/alstom-south-africa

Union Carriage & Wagon (UCW) is a South African rolling stock manufacturer. In 2016, after the French group Alstom acquired a majority stake, the company was renamed Alstom Ubunye.

== History ==
Union Carriage & Wagon was founded in 1957. The company initially built passenger coaches. In 1964, UCW produced its first electric locomotive for the South African Railways, the Class 5E1, Series 2. The Class 5E1 was also the first electric locomotive to be produced in quantity in South Africa. UCW also built electric multiple units, including the 5M2A fleet used in South African commuter rail between 1962 and 1985. Many of these units were later rebuilt into newer classes such as the 10M3, 10M4, and 10M5.

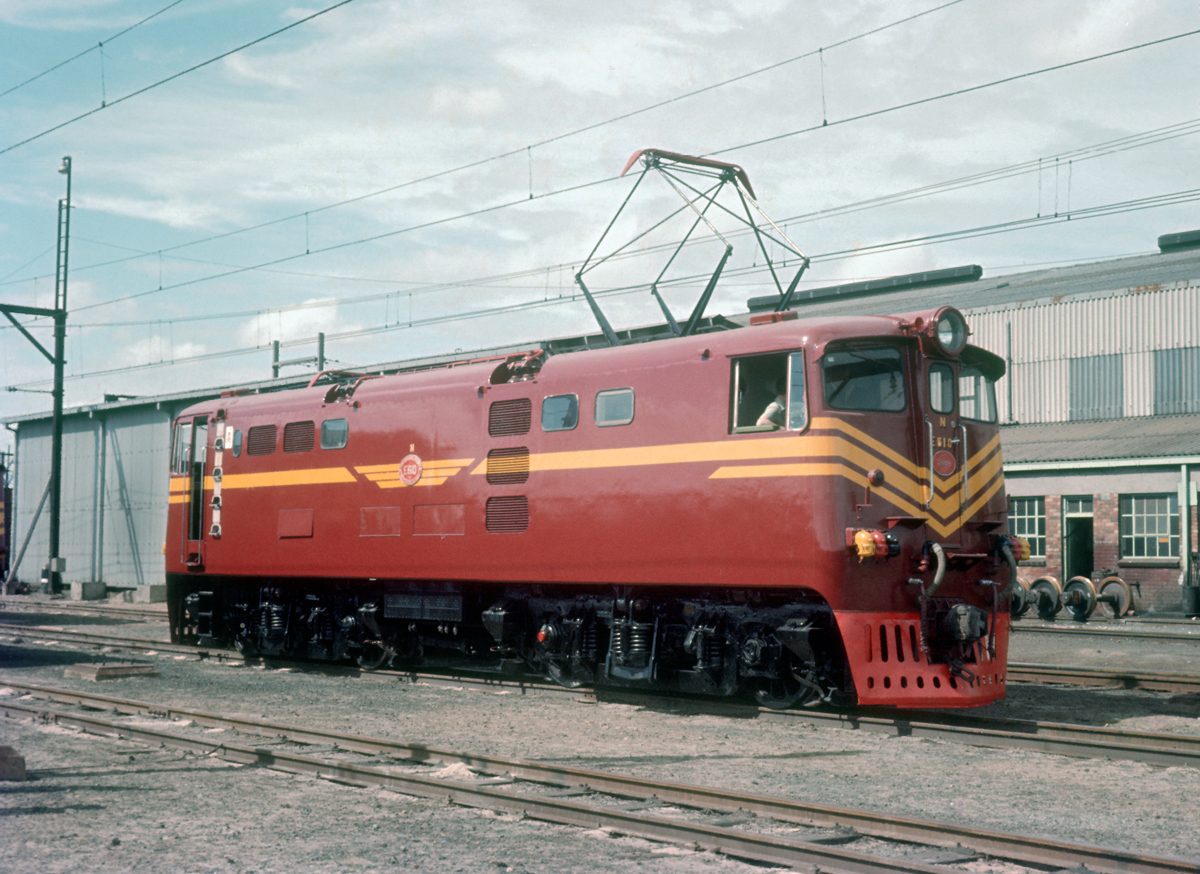
Class 5E1, Series 2 locomotive

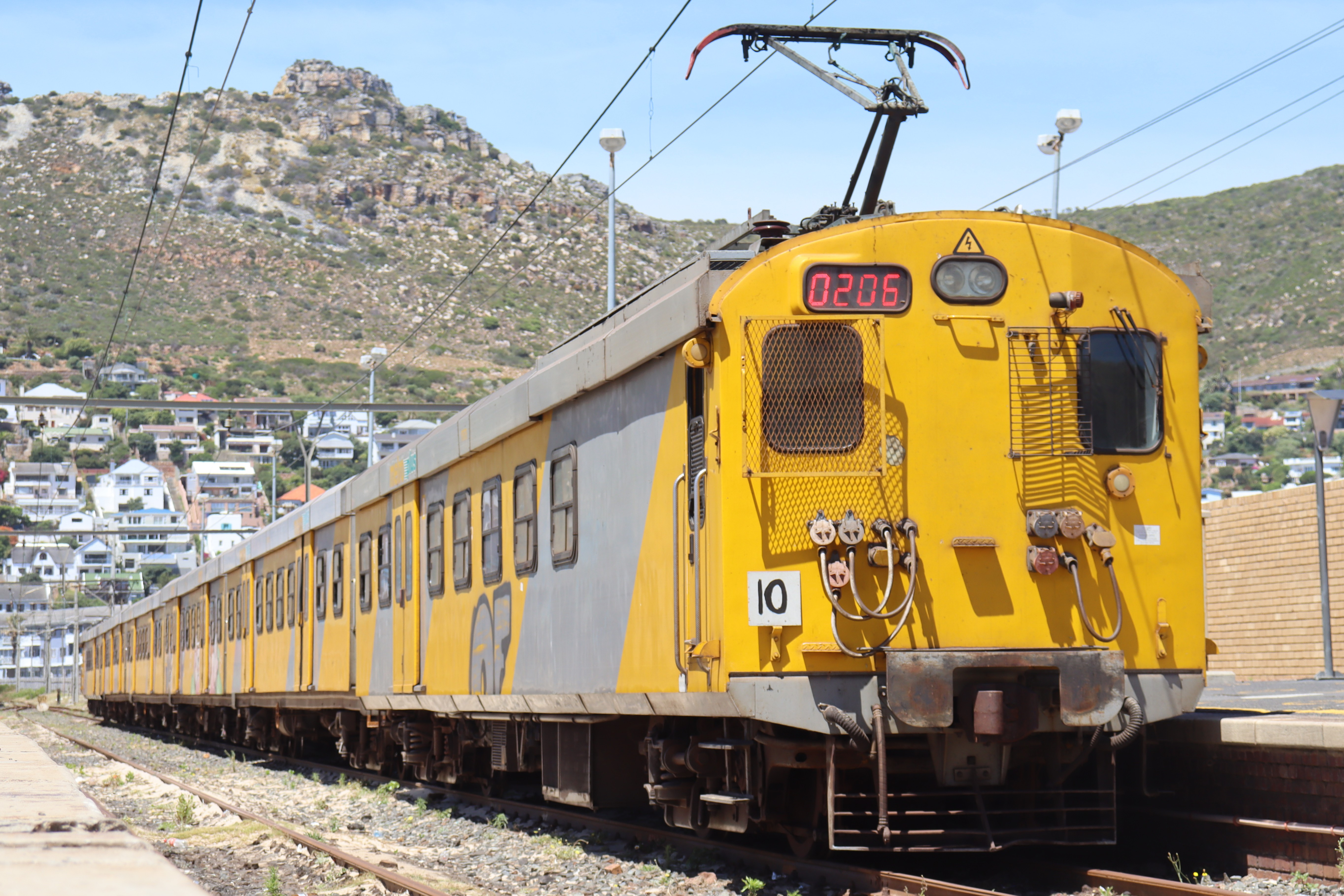
Class 5M2A EMU

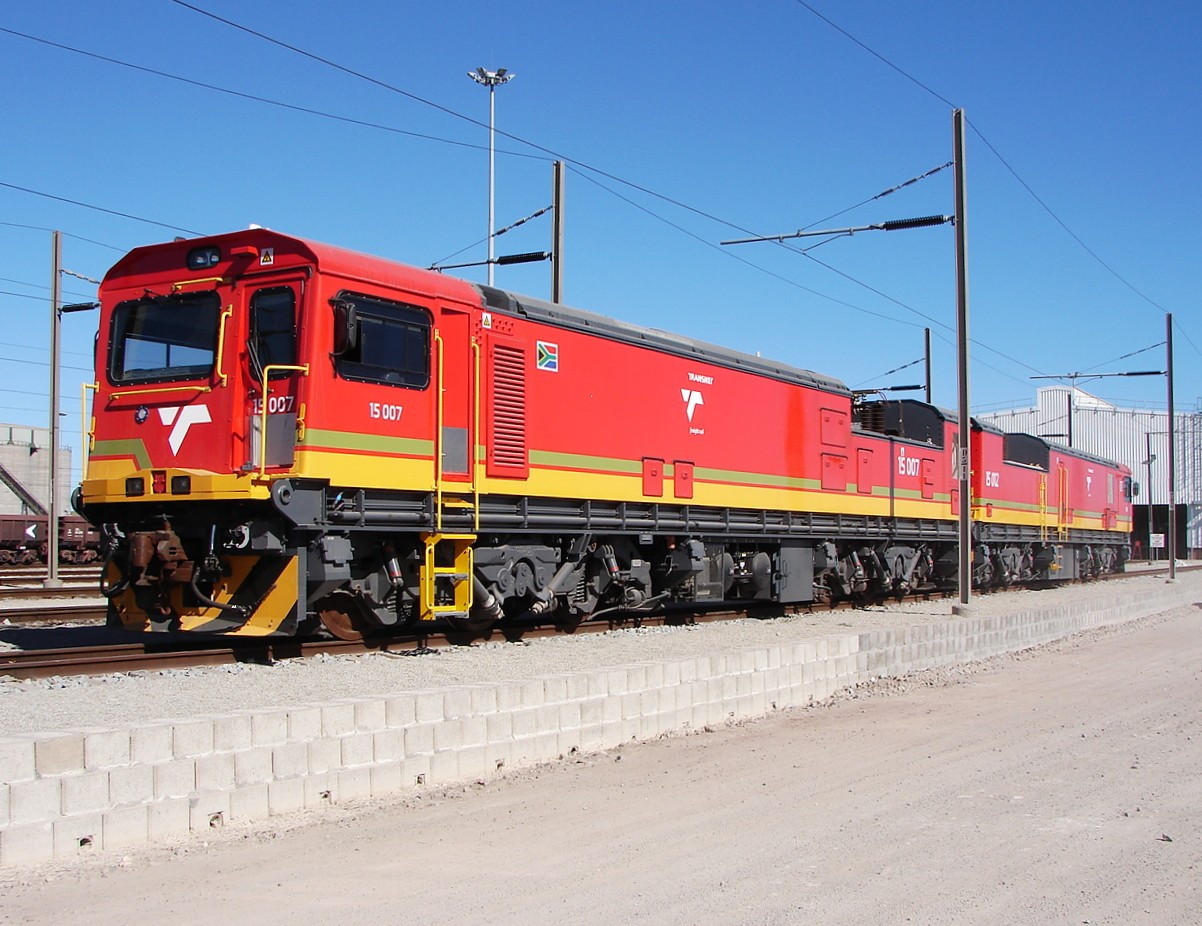
Class 15E locomotive

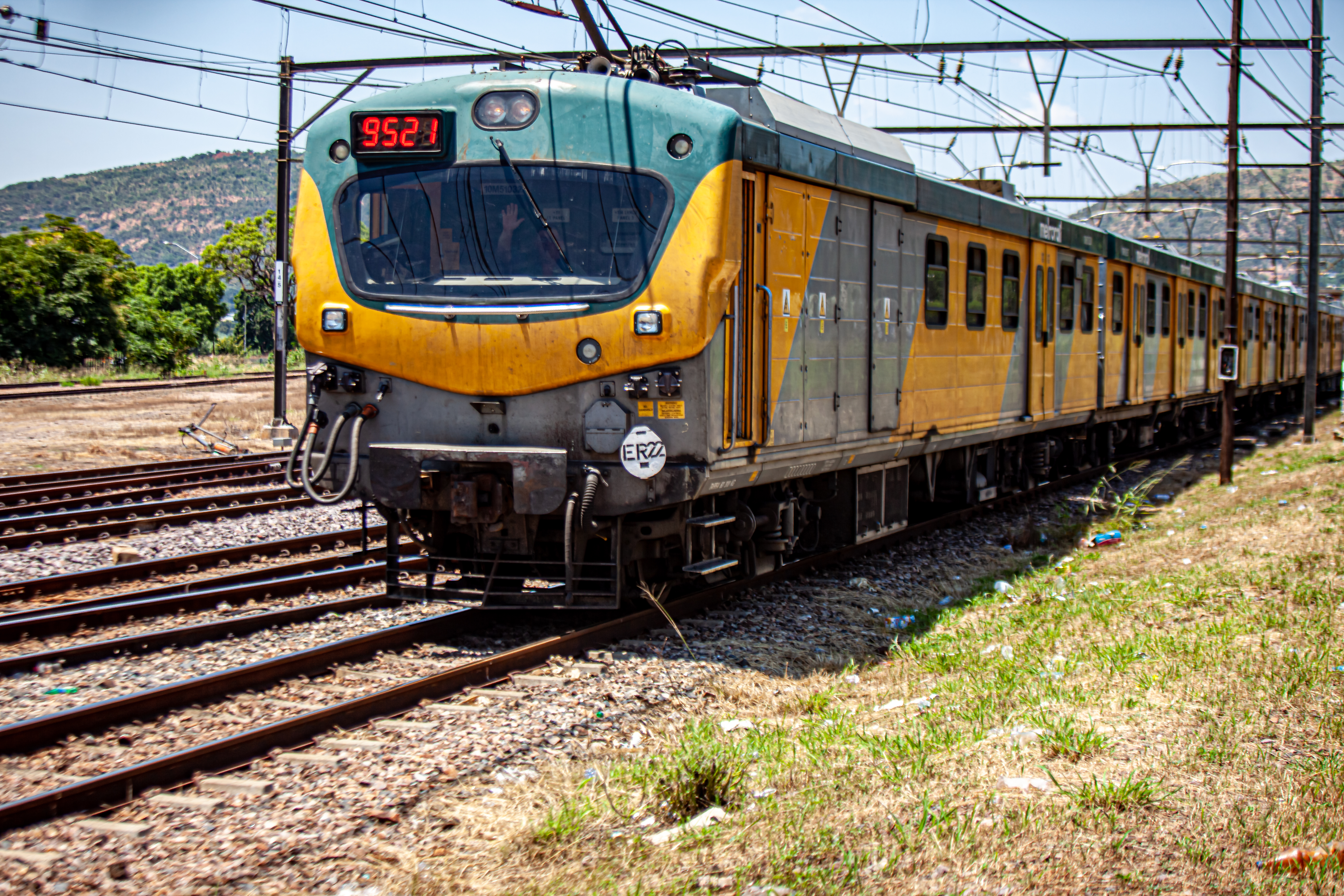
Class 10M4 EMU

The Nigel manufacturing plant became a major production site, covering about 3.7 ha (9.1 acres). Between 1964 and 1985, UCW produced over 1,600 electric locomotives with GEC traction equipment. Over time, the plant delivered about 14,000 vehicles, including locomotives, coaches, wagons, and specialised vehicles.

In 1974, UCW entered the international market with orders from Angola and Zambia. In 1976, UCW received its first Asian order for twenty Type E100 electric locomotives for the Taiwan Railways Administration (TRA), based on a GEC design. The TRA E1000 push-pull trainsets were also manufactured jointly by UCW, GEC-Alsthom, Tang Eng Iron Works of Taiwan, and Hyundai Rotem of South Korea. In 1993, UCW formed a joint venture with Siemens Mobility, SGP Verkehrstechnik, and China Steel Corporation to manufacture 216 cars (36 six-car sets) of C321 metro cars for the Bannan Line of the Taipei Metro, with the first entering service in 1999.

UCW assembled rolling stock for the Gautrain at its Nigel facility under a partnership with Bombardier Transportation. It also built electric locomotives such as the Class 19E and 15E for Transnet.

=== Ownership ===
The initial shareholders were Commonwealth Engineering (51%), Budd Company (25%) and Leyland Motors (12%). By 1965, Budd and Metro Cammell Weymann held a combined 41% shareholding which they sold to Anglo American plc and General Mining. In December 1969, Commonwealth Engineering reduced its shareholding to 42% with the other two shareholders each owning 29%.

In 1987, Commonwealth Engineering Parent company Australian National Industries sold its shareholding to Malbak Limited. In October 1996, the business was sold to Murray & Roberts.

In February 2013, the company was sold to the Commuter Transport and Locomotive Engineering (CTLE). CTLE is a consortium between the Industrial Development Corporation (IDC) and Commuter Transport Engineering (CTE). In April 2016, Alstom acquired a 51% stake in CTLE and renamed Alstom Ubunye.

== See also ==
- Gibela
