= 2004 in South Africa =

- Decades: 1980s; 1990s; 2000s; 2010s; 2020s
- See also: 2004 in South African sport; List of years in South Africa

The following lists events that happened during 2004 in South Africa.

== Incumbents ==
- President: Thabo Mbeki.
- Deputy President: Jacob Zuma.
- Chief Justice: Arthur Chaskalson.

=== Cabinet ===
The Cabinet, together with the President and the Deputy President, forms part of the Executive.

=== Provincial Premiers ===
- Eastern Cape Province: Makhenkesi Stofile (until 26 April), Nosimo Balindlela (since 26 April)
- Free State Province: Winkie Direko (until 26 April), Beatrice Marshoff (since 26 April)
- Gauteng Province: Mbhazima Shilowa
- KwaZulu-Natal Province: Lionel Mtshali (until 26 April), S'bu Ndebele (since 26 April)
- Limpopo Province:
  - until 22 April: Ngoako Ramathlodi
  - 22 April-26 April: Catherine Mabuza
  - since 26 April: Sello Moloto
- Mpumalanga Province: Ndaweni Mahlangu (until 26 April), Thabang Makwetla (since 26 April)
- North West Province: Popo Molefe (until 30 April), Edna Molewa (since 30 April)
- Northern Cape Province: Manne Dipico (until 30 April), Elizabeth Dipuo Peters (since 30 April)
- Western Cape Province:
  - until 23 April: Marthinus van Schalkwyk
  - 23 April-30 April: Leonard Ramatlakane
  - since 30 April: Ebrahim Rasool

== Events ==
January

- 1 – Asher Karni, an Israeli and South African businessman from Sea Point who is alleged to have supplied nuclear technology to Pakistan, is arrested at Denver International Airport, Colorado.

March

- 7 – 64 suspected mercenaries are arrested at Harare, Zimbabwe. 20 of them are South African including their leader, Simon Mann, a former British Army officer and security expert.
- Building of the new Giriyondo Border Post between South Africa and Mozambique in the Great Limpopo Transfrontier Park begins.

April

- 14 – The third democratic elections are held and won by the African National Congress.
- 16 – A set of shell beads, estimated to be 75,000 years old, is discovered at the excavations at Blombos cave near Stilbaai in the Western Cape.

May

•On 15 May 2004, South Africa won the bid to host the 2010 FIFA World Cup.

June

- Nelson Mandela announces he is "retiring from retirement".

July

- 1 – A South African Air Force Oryx helicopter crash lands near the Johannesburg International Airport, with no fatalities.
- 6 – A South African Air Force SE-316B Alouette III helicopter crash lands at Grahamstown, with no fatalities.
- Avian influenza is diagnosed in ostriches in the Eastern Cape and Western Cape.

August

- 23 – SAS Mendi, a Valour-class frigate, and HMS Nottingham, a Type 42 destroyer, meet at the site where the World War I troopship SS Mendi sank. Wreaths are laid in remembrance to those who died in service of their country.
- 25 – Sir Mark Thatcher, son of former British Prime Minister Margaret Thatcher, is arrested at his home in Cape Town for his alleged involvement in the Equatorial Guinea coup plot.
- 27 – Simon Mann, former British Army officer, security expert and mercenary, is found guilty of attempting to buy arms for the alleged Equatorial Guinea coup plot and is sentenced to 7 years imprisonment, while the 66 co-accused are acquitted.

September

- 1 – Six people are killed and more than 100 are injured in a gas explosion in the Sasol synthetic fuel plant in Secunda.
- 9 – The first locally assembled Agusta A109 light utility helicopter makes its first flight at Denel's Kempton Park facilities.

December

- 15 – South Africa announces that it will buy the Airbus A400M transport aircraft.
- 26 – 17 South Africans are among the victims of the 2004 Indian Ocean tsunami.

== Deaths ==
- 13 March – Dullah Omar, lawyer and politician. (b. 1934)
- 9 May – Brenda Fassie, singer. (b. 1964)
- 27 May – Nimrod Sejake, activist. (b. 1920)
- 7 September – Beyers Naudé, cleric, theologian and activist. (b. 1915)
- 12 September – Rachel Simons, communist trade unionist. (b. 1914)
- 12 December – Phaswane Mpe, poet and novelist. (b. 1970)
- 25 December – Ian Syster, long-distance runner. (b. 1976)

== Sports ==
=== Olympic Games ===
- The team of Roland Schoeman, Lyndon Ferns, Darian Townsend and Ryk Neethling wins the gold medal at the 2004 Olympic Games in Athens, simultaneously breaking the world record in the 4x100 freestyle relay. Shoeman, Ferns and Neethling trained at the University of Arizona.

== See also ==
- 2005 in South African television
