= 2006 in South Africa =

- Decades: 1980s; 1990s; 2000s; 2010s; 2020s
- See also: 2006 in South African sport; List of years in South Africa

The following lists events that happened during 2006 in South Africa.

== Incumbents ==
- President: Thabo Mbeki.
- Deputy President: Phumzile Mlambo-Ngcuka.
- Chief Justice: Pius Langa.

=== Cabinet ===
The Cabinet, together with the President and the Deputy President, forms part of the Executive.

=== Provincial Premiers ===
- Eastern Cape Province: Nosimo Balindlela
- Free State Province: Beatrice Marshoff
- Gauteng Province: Mbhazima Shilowa
- KwaZulu-Natal Province: S'bu Ndebele
- Limpopo Province: Sello Moloto
- Mpumalanga Province: Thabang Makwetla
- North West Province: Edna Molewa
- Northern Cape Province: Elizabeth Dipuo Peters
- Western Cape Province: Ebrahim Rasool

== Events ==
January

- 10 – Three miners are killed and four others are injured when a magnitude 2.4 earthquake traps twelve miners underground at the TauTona gold mine near Carletonville.
- 26–28 – A large fire breaks out on the slopes of Table Mountain, taking one life.

February

- 18–23 – The Koeberg nuclear power station automatically disconnects from the national power grid after when a loose bolt damages a rotor, leaving large parts of the Western Cape without electricity supply. Load shedding in the form of erratic rolling blackouts persist during the week, causing around R500 billion in losses to industry, according to some estimates.

March

- 1 – Local government elections are held.
- 5 – Tsotsi wins the 2005 Academy Award for Best Foreign Language Film at the 78th Academy Awards.
- 8 – David Goldblatt is awarded the Hasselblad Foundation International Award in Photography.
- 13 – The South African Transport and Allied Workers Union (Satawu) starts a week-long national strike over the restructuring of Transnet.
- 14 – Kofi Annan, United Nations secretary-general, addresses parliament in Cape Town urging African leaders to improve conditions in Africa.
- 14–15 – Members of the South African Students' Congress (Sasco) and African National Congress Youth League stage violent protests at the North-West University's Mafikeng campus over the exclusion of some students because of unpaid fees.
- 23 – Eight miners are trapped underground when a fire breaks out at the Buffelsfontein mine in Stilfontein.
- 23–24 – About 150,000 security guards go on a two-day nationwide strike, but continues into April and May.
- 25 – R69,000,000 (US$11.39m) is stolen in a cash heist from a South African Airways aircraft at Johannesburg International Airport.
- 27 – 5,000 Telkom workers stage a protest march against Telkoms's profit-sharing scheme in Pretoria.
- 30 – Six South Africans die when the al-Dana, a motorised dhow, sinks off Manama, Bahrain.

April

- 3 – Herman van Rooyen and Rudi Gouws, two Boeremag treason trial accused, escape from the Pretoria High Court.
- 3 – The Alexandros T, a Greek bulk carrier, sinks about 300 nautical miles (560 km) east of Port Elizabeth.
- 4 – A senior policeman goes on a shooting rampage, killing three women and a baby in Tarlton, before killing four officers at Kagiso police station in Krugersdorp. After fleeing in a police car, the gunman is tracked to Sebokeng, where he is shot dead by police colleagues.
- 6 – A giant rotor to replace the damaged rotor at Koeberg nuclear power station arrives in Cape Town on board the South African Navy's replenishment ship SAS Drakensberg (A301).
- 24 – The first of four South African Air Force Super Lynx 300 helicopters flies at AgustaWestland's Yeovil factory in England.
- 25 – The case against the owner of a dry-cleaning business and five others is dismissed in the Vereeniging court. They were accused of murdering employees Constance Moeletsi, Victoria Ndweni and Jocelyn Lesito, who were allegedly forced into a washing machine that was then switched on.

May

- 8 – Jacob Zuma, former Deputy President of South Africa, is acquitted of rape charges.

June

- 1 – The 16th World Economic Forum on Africa is convened in Cape Town.
- 25 – A shoot-out in Jeppestown, Johannesburg, leaves eight suspects and four police officers dead following a supermarket robbery in the suburb of Honeydew.

July

- 16 – The first South African Air Force twin-seat SAAB JAS 39D Gripen arrives in South Africa.

September

- 5 – Vladimir Putin, President of the Russian Federation, arrives in Cape Town and meets with Thabo Mbeki, President of South Africa.
- 20 – The corruption trial of Jacob Zuma, former Deputy President of South Africa, is struck off the roll at the Pietermaritzburg High Court.
- 22 – A Sasol Tigers Aero L-29 Delfín crashes into Table Bay off Milnerton while on a validation flight for the Africa Aerospace and Defence air show, killing the pilot Martin van Straten.
- 29 – Four security guards transporting money to a bank die when their van is forced off the road and shot at during an attempted cash-in-transit heist in Limpopo. Three of the victims burned to death when the overturned van was set on fire using a flammable chemical.
- 30–3 October – Manmohan Singh, Prime Minister of India, arrives in Durban on a four-day state visit.

October

- 7 – The Marriage Alliance protests in Pretoria against same-sex marriage.
- 12 – Herschelle Gibbs, cricketer, is questioned by the New Delhi police in Mumbai, India in connection with his alleged role in a 2000 cricket match-fixing scandal.
- 16 – South Africa is selected for the first time as a non-permanent member of the United Nations Security Council for the 2007–2008 period.

November

- 1 – Nelson Mandela is awarded the Amnesty International Ambassador of Conscience Award.
- 14 – The National Assembly passes the Same-sex marriage bill.

== Deaths ==
- 18 January – Anton Rupert, billionaire businessman and philanthropist. (b. 1916)
- 27 February – Tsakani Mhinga (known as TK), singer and songwriter. (b. 1978)
- 16 April – Brett Goldin, actor (b. 1977)
- 19 April – Ellen Kuzwayo, political activist (b. 1914)
- 7 May – Stella Sigcau, politician, 1st female prime minister of the Transkei (b. 1937)
- 8 May – Patrick Ntsoelengoe, football player (b. 1952)
- 21 July – Barry Streek, journalist, political activist, author (b. 1948)
- 23 October – Lebo Mathosa, singer and dancer (b. 1977)
- 31 October – P.W. Botha, former prime minister and state president. (b. 1916)
- 12 November – Jabu Khanyile, musician, lead musician of music group Bayete (b. 1957)

== Railways ==
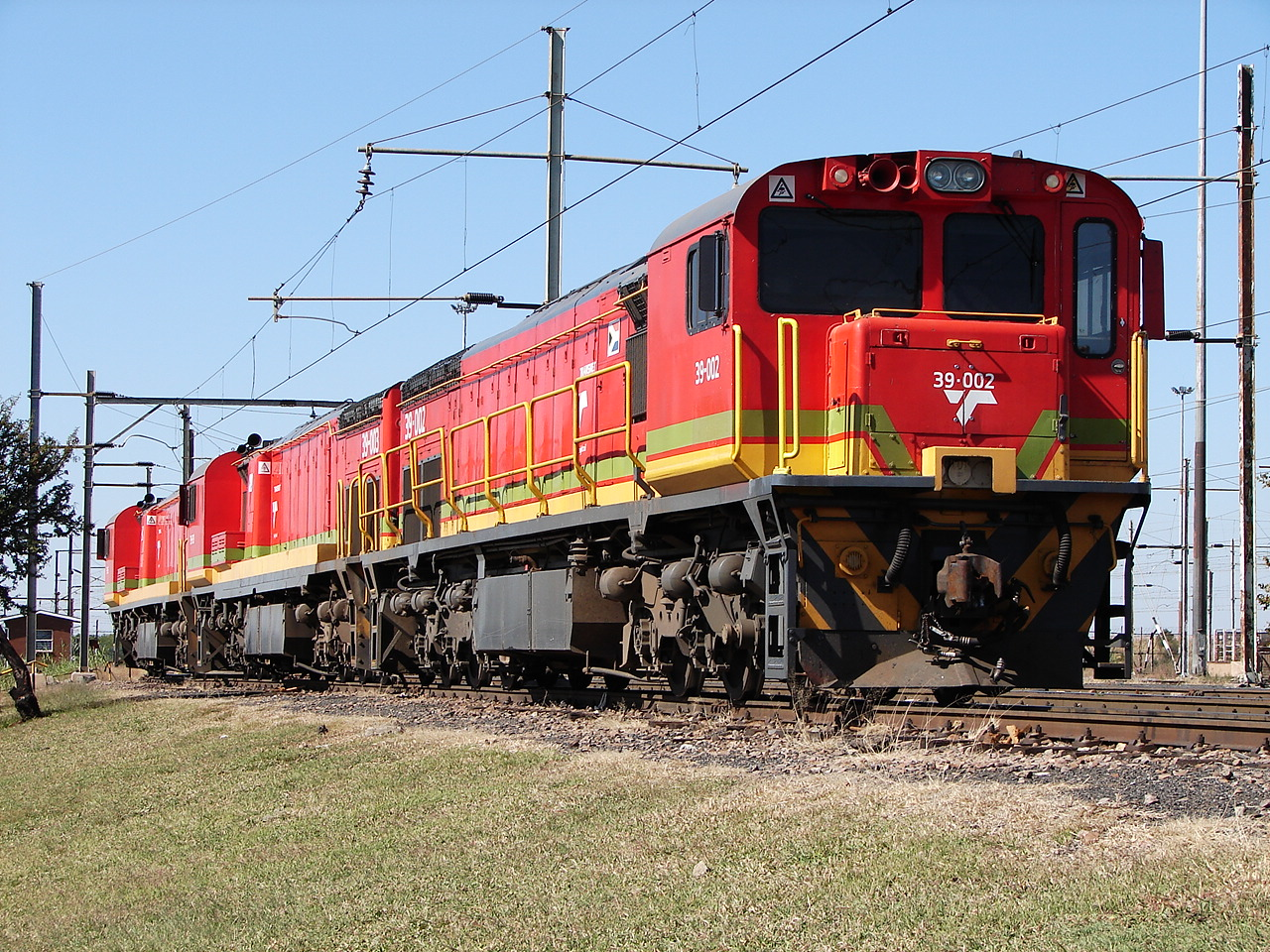
Class 39-000

=== Locomotives ===
- April – Transwerk completes the rebuilding of the first of five Class 39-000 Electro-Motive Diesel type GT26CU-3 locomotives for Spoornet from a Class 34-600 locomotive.

== Sports ==
=== Athletics ===
- 12 February – George Mofokeng wins his first national title in the men's marathon, clocking 2:15:06 in Port Elizabeth.

== See also ==
- 2006 in South African television
