= 2007 in South Africa =

- Decades: 1980s; 1990s; 2000s; 2010s; 2020s
- See also: List of years in South Africa

The following lists events that happened during 2007 in South Africa.

== Incumbents ==
- President: Thabo Mbeki.
- Deputy President: Phumzile Mlambo-Ngcuka.
- Chief Justice: Pius Langa.

=== Cabinet ===
The Cabinet, together with the President and the Deputy President, forms part of the Executive.

=== Provincial Premiers ===
- Eastern Cape Province: Nosimo Balindlela
- Free State Province: Beatrice Marshoff
- Gauteng Province: Mbhazima Shilowa
- KwaZulu-Natal Province: S'bu Ndebele
- Limpopo Province: Sello Moloto
- Mpumalanga Province: Thabang Makwetla
- North West Province: Edna Molewa
- Northern Cape Province: Elizabeth Dipuo Peters
- Western Cape Province: Ebrahim Rasool

== Events ==
=== January ===
- 17 – South Africa is selected as the host of the sub-region's Maritime Rescue Co-ordination Centre. Included in the sub-region are Angola, Comoros, Madagascar, Mozambique and Namibia.

=== February ===
- 6–8 – President of China, Hu Jintao, visits South Africa.
- 23 – South African Courts dismiss charges against Simon Mann, former British Army officer, security expert and mercenary, and 7 other suspected mercenaries.
- A large-scale Community Survey is conducted in all provinces by Statistics South Africa.

=== May ===
- 2 – A Zimbabwean court rules that Simon Mann, former British Army officer, security expert and mercenary, be extradited to Equatorial Guinea to face charges of leading a failed coup d'état.

=== September ===
- 10 – The National Prosecuting Authority obtains an arrest warrant for Jackie Selebi, president of Interpol and South Africa's National Police Commissioner.
- 14 – A search warrant is added to the arrest warrant for Jackie Selebi.
- 23 – Vusi Pikoli, Director of the National Prosecuting Authority, is suspended.

=== November ===
- 5 – Tiny Makopo, dormitory matron at Oprah Winfrey's Leadership Academy for Girls, is arrested for the abuse at the academy of six girls aged 13–14 and one woman aged 23.
- 7 – Nationwide Airlines Flight 723 performs an emergency landing at Cape Town International Airport, South Africa, because the right-side engine detached from the aircraft. All 112 occupants survive.

=== December ===
- 18 – Jacob Zuma is elected chairman of the African National Congress.

== Births ==
- 16 February – Stacey Fru, writer

== Deaths ==
- 4 January – Marais Viljoen, former State President. (b. 1915)
- 9 January – Elmer Symons, motorcyclist. (b. 1977)
- 18 March – Bob Woolmer, Proteas cricket coach from 1994 to 1999. (b. 1948)
- 11 July – William Flynn, actor and comedian, (b. 1948)
- 19 July – Sid Kiel, doctor and sportsman (b. 1916)
- 1 August – Ryan Cox, professional road racing cyclist (b. 1979)
- 10 September – Stanley Nadas, (b.1949)
- 18 October – Lucky Dube, reggae singer. (b. 1964)
- 20 November – Ian Smith, former Prime Minister of Rhodesia. (b. 1919)
- 22 November – Reg Park, British bodybuilder, businessman, and actor. (b. 1928)

== Sports ==
=== Athletics ===
- 11 February – George Mofokeng wins his second national title in the men's marathon, clocking 2:13:50 in Port Elizabeth.

=== Rugby ===
- 20 October– South Africa defeats England 15–6 in the final to win the 2007 Rugby World Cup.

== See also ==
- 2007 in South African television
