= 2005 in South Africa =

- Decades: 1980s; 1990s; 2000s; 2010s; 2020s
- See also: 2005 in South African sport; List of years in South Africa

The following lists events that happened during 2005 in South Africa.

== Incumbents ==
- President: Thabo Mbeki.
- Deputy President: Jacob Zuma (until 14 June), Phumzile Mlambo-Ngcuka (starting 14 June).
- Chief Justice: Arthur Chaskalson then Pius Langa.

=== Cabinet ===
The Cabinet, together with the President and the Deputy President, forms part of the Executive.

=== Provincial Premiers ===
- Eastern Cape Province: Nosimo Balindlela
- Free State Province: Beatrice Marshoff
- Gauteng Province: Mbhazima Shilowa
- KwaZulu-Natal Province: S'bu Ndebele
- Limpopo Province: Sello Moloto
- Mpumalanga Province: Thabang Makwetla
- North West Province: Edna Molewa
- Northern Cape Province: Elizabeth Dipuo Peters
- Western Cape Province: Ebrahim Rasool

== Events ==
January

- 1 - The University of Johannesburg is founded as the result of a merger between the Rand Afrikaans University (RAU), the Technikon Witwatersrand (TWR) and the Soweto and East Rand campuses of Vista University
- 13 – Mark Thatcher pleads guilty to unwittingly bankrolling an alleged coup d'état plot in Equatorial Guinea.
- 31 – Thabo Mbeki, President of South Africa, is nearly hit by a car shortly after the African Union heads-of-state summit in Abuja, Nigeria.

February

- 15 – The South African Air Force grounds its seven C-130BZ Hercules transport aircraft because of cracks in the wing structure. This leaves the Air Force with only two ex USAF C-130Bs.

March

- 8 – Pretoria's council votes to change the city's name to Tshwane. The renaming is yet to be ratified.
- 9 – An earthquake measuring 5.3 on the Richter magnitude scale occurs at Stilfontein's Hartebeestfontein gold mine.
- 18 – A South African Air Force Alouette III helicopter crashes next to the N3 highway in Harrismith.
- 25–27 – The Griqua people gather in Philippolis, Free State to celebrate their heritage.

April

- 9 – A South African Air Force Pilatus PC-7 Mk 2 Astra training aircraft crashes near Lichtenburg, killing trainee pilot Oupa Ramaiti during his second solo flight.
- 28 – South Africa becomes a partner in the Airbus A400M Atlas airlifter programme and signs for 8 aircraft, with another six on option.

May

- 23 – A seismic event measuring about 3.5 on the Richter magnitude scale occurs at 08:10 with its epicentre at Carletonville and causes rockfalls at East Driefontein gold mine, injuring 19 miners, 3 seriously.
- 26 – The South African Geographical Names Council approves the name change of Pretoria to Tshwane.

June

- 7–10 – The second national AIDS conference takes place in Durban.
- 8 – Schabir Shaik is found guilty and is sentenced to 15 years imprisonment on two counts of corruption and 3 years on a count of fraud.
- 14 – Jacob Zuma is relieved of his post as Deputy President of South Africa, following the verdict in Schabir Shaik's trial on the 8th, and is to stand trial in 2006.
- 22 – Phumzile Mlambo-Ngcuka is appointed as the new Deputy President of South Africa.
- 22 – Four of the South African Air Force C-130BZ Hercules transport aircraft are released for flying operations, but under flying and maintenance restrictions.
- 27 – The Congress of South African Trade Unions holds a one-day nationwide strike over unemployment and poverty.
- 28 – Thabo Mbeki, President of South Africa, and Laurent Gbagbo, President of Côte d'Ivoire, hold talks in Pretoria to advance peace in Côte d'Ivoire.

July

- 4 – A South African Air Force MB-326K Impala Mk II jet crashes just after take-off from Hoedspruit after striking two vultures. Pilot Captain Colin Sparke ejects safely.
- 12 – The South African Municipal Workers Union holds a one-day strike during wage negotiations.
- 22–28 – South African Airways cabin crew workers go on strike over a wage dispute.
- 22–2 August – Workers of Pick 'n Pay, a large supermarket chain store, go on strike over a wage dispute.
- 27–29 – The South African Municipal Workers Union holds a three-day strike as a threat during wage negotiations.

August

- 7–11 – The National Union of Mineworkers goes on strike to demand better pay.
- 8–14 – The South African Municipal Workers Union goes on strike over a wage dispute.

September

- 10 – A Sasol Tigers Aero L-29 Delfin jet crashes during an aerobatic display at an airshow in Vereeniging, killing pilots Gabriel Siyabonga Ndabandaba and Johnny "Jet" Hattingh.

October

- South Africa announces a R140 million (US$22 million) donation to the United Nations World Food Programme (WFP) and the Food and Agriculture Organisation (FAO) to alleviate food shortages in southern Africa.
- Jacob Zuma, former Deputy President of South Africa, is charged with corruption by the National Prosecuting Authority.

November

- 10 – The Southern African Large Telescope (Salt) in Sutherland, the largest telescope in the Southern Hemisphere, is inaugurated.
- 11 – A fault at Koeberg nuclear power station results in a shutdown of the reactor, cutting the power supply to much of the Western Cape. Power is restored to most areas within 2 hours.
- 11 – The first South African Air Force JAS 39D Gripen makes its maiden flight at Saab's Flight Test Centre in Linköping, Sweden.
- 16 – A fire under a 400 kV transmission line results in a second power trip at Koeberg, causing another blackout across the Western Cape.
- 23 – A routine inspection at Koeberg reveals a diminished chemical level in the backup safety system, resulting in a controlled shutdown. Backup generation is used to avert power loss until Friday 25 November, when major cuts take place throughout the day in the Western, Northern and Eastern Cape. Power is restored to normal by Saturday 26 November.
- 27 – Karin Kortje is voted as South Africa's third Idols winner, beating Gift Gwe in the final, and becomes the first non-white to win the competition.
- The Advertising Standards Authority finds that advertising proclaiming Tshwane, rather than Pretoria, as the capital of South Africa is misleading as the name Tshwane has not yet been approved by the Arts and Culture Minister.

December

- 1 – The Constitutional Court orders parliament to amend the marriage laws to allow homosexual weddings within a year.
- 6 – Jacob Zuma, former Deputy President of South Africa, is charged with rape.

== Deaths ==
- 6 January – Makgatho Mandela, Nelson Mandela's son. (b. 1950)
- 19 January – K. Sello Duiker, novelist. (b. 1974)
- 20 February – Raymond Mhlaba, South African political activist. (b. 1920)
- 20 February – Dalene Matthee, novelist. (b. 1938)
- 16 March – Allan Hendrickse, politician. (b. 1927)
- 29 May – Hamilton Naki, laboratory assistant to Christiaan Barnard. (b. 1926)
- 12 June – Makobo Modjadji, 6th Rain Queen of the Balobedu. (b. 1978)
- 30 June – Ingwenyama Mayitjha III, King of the Ndzundza-Mabhoko. (b. 1947)
- 8 August – Ahmed Deedat, Sunni Muslim missionary. (b. 1918)
- 17 August – Howard Watt, rugby player. (b. 1911)
- 19 August – Prince James Mahlangu, South African politician, Ndebele prince and the last Chief Minister of KwaNdebele (b. 1953)
- 16 September – Mzukisi Sikali, boxer. (b. 1971)
- 29 November – Deon van der Walt, tenor. (b. 1958)
- 31 December – King Xolilizwe Mzikayise Sigcawu, Gcaleka King. (b. 1926)

== Sports ==
=== Athletics ===
- 20 February – Johannes Kekana wins his first national title in the men's marathon, clocking 2:19:16 in Durban.

=== Tennis ===
- 2 July – Wesley Moodie and Australian Stephen Huss win the 2005 Wimbledon Championships – Men's Doubles

== See also ==
- 2005 in South African television
