= 2009 in South Africa =

- Decades: 1980s; 1990s; 2000s; 2010s; 2020s
- See also: List of years in South Africa

The following lists events that happened during 2009 in South Africa.

== Incumbents ==
- President:
  - Kgalema Motlanthe (until 8 May).
  - Jacob Zuma (from 9 May).
- Deputy President: Baleka Mbete (until 9 May), Kgalema Motlanthe (starting 9 May).
- Chief Justice: Pius Langa then Sandile Ngcobo.

=== Cabinet ===
The Cabinet, together with the President and the Deputy President, forms part of the Executive.

=== Provincial Premiers ===
- Eastern Cape Province: Mbulelo Sogoni (until 6 May), Noxolo Kiviet (since 6 May)
- Free State Province: Beatrice Marshoff (until 6 May), Ace Magashule (since 6 May)
- Gauteng Province: Paul Mashatile (until 6 May), Nomvula Mokonyane (since 6 May)
- KwaZulu-Natal Province: S'bu Ndebele (until 6 May), Zweli Mkhize (since 6 May)
- Limpopo Province: Sello Moloto (until 3 March), Cassel Mathale (since 3 March)
- Mpumalanga Province: Thabang Makwetla (until 10 May), David Mabuza (since 10 May)
- North West Province: Edna Molewa (until 6 May), Maureen Modiselle (since 6 May)
- Northern Cape Province: Elizabeth Dipuo Peters (until 6 May), Hazel Jenkins (since 6 May)
- Western Cape Province: Lynne Brown (until 6 May), Helen Zille (since 6 May)

== Events ==
January

- 8 – The 97th Anniversary of the ANC is celebrated.

February

- 4 – Jacob Zuma appears in the Pietermaritzburg High Court.
- 4 – Jimmy Mohlala, Mbombela Local Council Municipality speaker who had been asked to resign by the ANC following a whistle-blower act which saw Municipal manager Jacob Dladla suspended, is shot dead in his Nelspruit home. His 19-year-old son is wounded in the attack.
- 11 – Trevor Manuel presents the 2009–2010 budget.
- 11 – For the first time in South Africa, court proceedings in a trial are conducted entirely in isiZulu in the municipality of Msinga. The proceedings are part of a pilot project to offer "access to justice for all".

March

- 3 – South African holidaymakers need visas to enter the United Kingdom.
- 3 – Convicted fraudster Schabir Shaik is released from prison on medical parole.
- 4 – The 14th Dalai Lama's visa application to enter South Africa is refused.
- 12 – The Constitutional Court rules that registered voters living overseas can vote for the National Assembly in the 22 April elections.

April

- 7 – All charges against Jacob Zuma and French arms manufacturer Thint over the South African arms deal are officially withdrawn in the Durban High Court.
- 22 – The 2009 national and provincial elections are held.
- 25 – The Independent Electoral Commission publishes the elections results. The ANC won 65.9% of the vote, The DA won 16.66%.

May

- 6 – Jacob Zuma is elected president in the South African presidential election.

June

14 to 28 – The 2009 FIFA Confederations Cup takes place in South Africa and is won by Brazil, with the United States as the runner-up.

July

- 18 – The first Mandela Day is organised on Nelson Mandela's 91st Birthday.
- 19 – Gill Marcus is appointed Governor of the South African Reserve Bank by Jacob Zuma, to replace Tito Mboweni on 9 November.

September

- 22 – President Jacob Zuma meets with the Paramount leader of the People's Republic of China Hu Jintao in New York.
- 22–24 – The United States Embassy and other US government facilities in South Africa are closed because of unspecified security concerns.
- 24 – Airlink Flight 8911 crashes shortly after take-off, killing one and injuring three.

December

- 8 – Serial killer, serial rapist and criminal Ananias Mathe is sentenced to an effective 54 years in prison for various crimes.
- 12 – The Miss World 2009 pageant takes place Johannesburg.
- 13 – The Miss South Africa 2009 pageant takes place at Sun City.

== Deaths ==
- 1 January – Helen Suzman, activist and politician. (b. 1917)
- 11 January – Ludumo Galada, boxer. (b. 1982)
- 6 April – Ivy Matsepe-Casaburri, politician. (b. 1937)
- 13 October – Winston Mankunku Ngozi, musician. (b. 1943)
- 3 December – Curtis Nkondo, activist, educator, politician and ambassador. (b. 1928)
- 16 December – Manto Tshabalala-Msimang, politician. (b. 1940)
- 31 December – Masego Kgomo, murder victim. (b. c. 1999)

== Railways ==
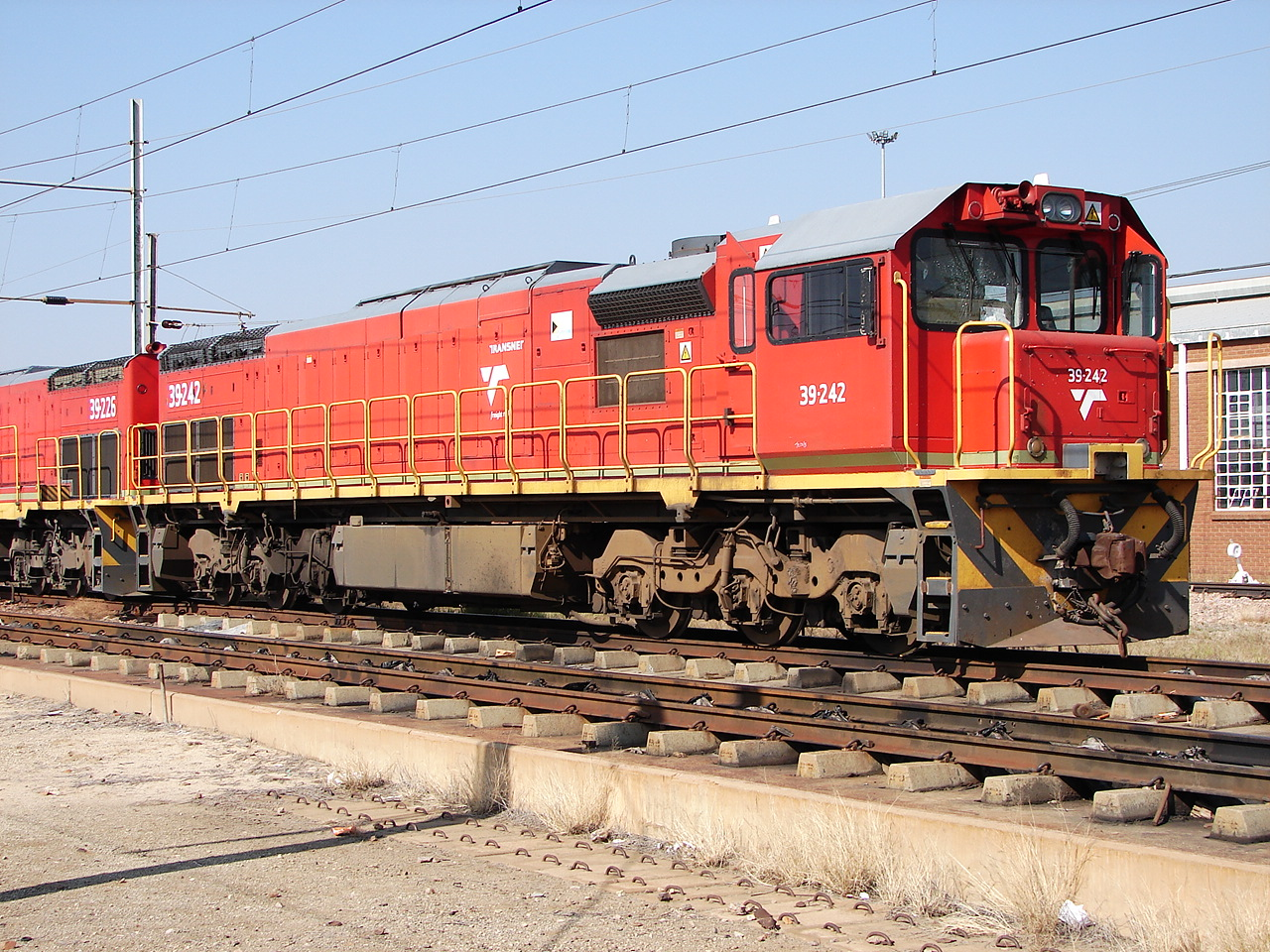
Class 39-200

=== Locomotives ===
- Two new Cape gauge locomotive types enter service on Transnet Freight Rail (TFR):
  - The first of fifty Class 39-200 Electro-Motive Diesel type GT26CU-3 diesel-electric locomotives, built at the Transnet Rail Engineering shops in Koedoespoort.
  - The first of 110 new Class 19E dual voltage 3 kV DC and 25 kV AC electric locomotives on the Coalink line from Ermelo to Richards Bay.
- TFR begins rebuilding Class 6E1, Series 2 to 8 locomotives to Class 18E, Series 2 locomotives.

== See also ==
- 2009 in South African television
