= 2008 in South Africa =

- Decades: 1980s; 1990s; 2000s; 2010s; 2020s
- See also: List of years in South Africa

The following lists events that happened during 2008 in South Africa.

== Incumbents ==
- President:
  - Thabo Mbeki (until 24 September).
  - Kgalema Motlanthe (from 25 September).
- Deputy President: Phumzile Mlambo-Ngcuka (until 24 September), Baleka Mbete (starting 24 September).
- Chief Justice: Pius Langa.

=== Cabinet ===
The Cabinet, together with the President and the Deputy President, forms part of the Executive.

=== Provincial Premiers ===
- Eastern Cape Province: Nosimo Balindlela (until 25 July), Mbulelo Sogoni (since 25 July)
- Free State Province: Beatrice Marshoff
- Gauteng Province:
  - until 29 September: Mbhazima Shilowa
  - 29 September-7 October: vacant
  - since 7 October: Paul Mashatile
- KwaZulu-Natal Province: S'bu Ndebele
- Limpopo Province: Sello Moloto
- Mpumalanga Province: Thabang Makwetla
- North West Province: Edna Molewa
- Northern Cape Province: Elizabeth Dipuo Peters
- Western Cape Province: Ebrahim Rasool (until 25 July), Lynne Brown (since 25 July)

== Events ==
January

- 12 – Jackie Selebi is suspended as South Africa's National Police Commissioner as the National Prosecuting Authority states that it will bring charges against him for corruption and defeating the ends of justice.
- 13 – Jackie Selebi resigns as president of Interpol.
- The University of Pretoria's business school, the Gordon Institute of Business Science, replaces the Graduate School of Management.

February

- 1 – Simon Mann, former British Army officer, security expert and mercenary, is extradited from Harare, Zimbabwe to Black Beach, Equatorial Guinea.

March

- 8 – Channel 4 wins a legal battle to broadcast the Simon Mann interview while he is incarcerated in Black Beach, Equatorial Guinea.

May

- 1 – Culling of elephants to control their population resumes after the 1995 ban on culling is lifted.
- 12 – Riots in South Africa begins as a result of the ongoing controversy of immigration.

=== June ===
- 3 – Andrew Jordaan is convicted at Pretoria High Court of abducting 7-year-old Sheldean Human, taking her into isolated bushes 500m from his home, killing her and leaving her body down a manhole. He is also found guilty of raping and indecently assaulting her eight-year-old friend. Sheldean disappeared on 18 February 2007, and Acting Judge Chris Eksteen calls Jordaan a 'blatant liar' over his version of events.

July

- 6–12 – The XXIII International Congress of Entomology takes place in Durban.
- 14 – Nosimo Balindlela, Premier of the Provincial Government of the Eastern Cape and Ebrahim Rasool, Premier of the Provincial Government of the Western Cape, are dismissed.

September

- 12 – Jacob Zuma's corruption case is dismissed by Judge Chris Nicholson.
- 20 – The African National Congress recalls President Thabo Mbeki.
- 21 – President Thabo Mbeki submits his letter of resignation to the speaker of the National Assembly.
- 22 – The African National Congress elects deputy leader Kgalema Motlanthe to replace Thabo Mbeki as president until April 2009, when new elections will be held.
- 23 – Eleven cabinet members and three deputy ministers resign, although five state that they would be willing to serve in the new administration in any capacity that the incoming president deems fit.
  - Deputy President Phumzile Mlambo-Ngcuka.
  - Minister of Correctional Services Ngconde Balfour.
  - Minister of Public Works Thoko Didiza.
  - Minister of Public Enterprises Alec Erwin.
  - Minister of Public Service and Administration Geraldine Fraser-Moleketi.
  - Minister of Intelligence Ronnie Kasrils.
  - Minister of Defence Mosiuoa Lekota.
  - Minister of Science and Technology Mosibudi Mangena.
  - Minister of Finance Trevor Manuel.
  - Minister of Provincial and Local Government Sydney Mufamadi.
  - Minister in the Presidency Essop Pahad.
  - Deputy Minister of Correctional Services Loretta Jacobus.
  - Deputy Minister of Finance Jabu Moleketi.
  - Deputy Minister of Foreign Affairs Aziz Pahad.
- 25 – Kgalema Motlanthe is sworn in as President of South Africa.
- 29 – Gauteng Premier Mbhazima Shilowa resigns.

== Deaths ==
- 22 January – John Gomomo, unionist and activist. (b. 1945)
- 15 September – John Matshikiza, actor, director, poet and journalist. (b. 1954)
- 27 October – Es'kia Mphahlele, writer, educationist, artist and activist. (b. 1919)
- 9 November – Miriam Makeba, singer. (b. 1932)

== See also ==
- 2008 in South African television
