= 2003 in South Africa =

- Decades: 1980s; 1990s; 2000s; 2010s; 2020s
- See also: 2003 in South African sport; List of years in South Africa

The following lists events that happened during 2003 in South Africa.

== Incumbents ==
- President: Thabo Mbeki.
- Deputy President: Jacob Zuma.
- Chief Justice: Arthur Chaskalson.

=== Cabinet ===
The Cabinet, together with the President and the Deputy President, forms part of the Executive.

=== Provincial Premiers ===
- Eastern Cape Province: Makhenkesi Stofile
- Free State Province: Winkie Direko
- Gauteng Province: Mbhazima Shilowa
- KwaZulu-Natal Province: Lionel Mtshali
- Limpopo Province: Ngoako Ramathlodi
- Mpumalanga Province: Ndaweni Mahlangu
- North West Province: Popo Molefe
- Northern Cape Province: Manne Dipico
- Western Cape Province: Marthinus van Schalkwyk

== Events ==
January

- 8 – Unit 2 power generator explodes at Duvha Power Station while coming back on line after maintenance.
- 17 – Jacob Zuma, Deputy President of South Africa, holds ceasefire talks with Pierre Nkurunziza, the leader of a faction of the National Council for the Defense of Democracy-Forces for the Defense of Democracy (CNDD-FDD).
- 21 – Jacob Zuma holds ceasefire talks with Alain Mugabarabona, the leader of the Palipehutu-FNL and Jean-Bosco Ndayikengurukiye, the leader of the other faction of CNDD-FDD.
- 24 – The Inkwazi, the South African Air Force Boeing Business Jet, develops technical problems during its inaugural flight taking President Thabo Mbeki to Paris, France, and has to turn back.
- 25–26 – Jacob Zuma facilitates meetings between Pierre Buyoya, the President of Burundi and rebels Alain Mugabarabona, Jean-Bosco Ndayikengurukiye and Pierre Nkurunziza in Pretoria.
- 27 – Pierre Buyoya, the President of Burundi and Pierre Nkurunziza, leader of a faction of the CNDD-FDD, sign a memorandum of understanding in Pretoria.

February

- 9 Feb- 23 Mar - South Africa co-hosts the ICC Cricket World Cup. Australia are declared champions after beating India in the final.

March

- 21 – The Truth and Reconciliation Commission releases its final report.

April

- 1 – The defence ministers of South Africa, Ethiopia and Mozambique announce in Addis Ababa that their countries will send 3,500 peace-keeping troops under the African Union flag to Burundi within 60 days.
- 1 – A South African Air Force Cheetah C fighter jet crashes near Louis Trichardt with pilot Major Andrea Serra ejecting safely.

May

- 13 – Health Minister Manto Tshabalala-Msimang presents her budget speech to the National Assembly, outlining that free health care will be extended to people with disabilities.

June

- 5 – A South African Air Force Oryx helicopter crash lands at Durban International Airport and the crew suffer minor injuries.
- 6 – Nkosazana Dlamini-Zuma, Celso Amorim and Yashwant Sinha, foreign ministers of South Africa, Brazil and India, meet in Brasília, Brazil and sign the Brasilia Declaration.
- PJ Powers and Sibongile Khumalo are awarded the 2002 Reconciliation Award by the Institute for Justice and Reconciliation.
- The name of the town Louis Trichardt is changed to Makhado.

July

- 31 – SABC shuts down Bop TV due to financial constraints.

August

- 3–6 – A National AIDS Conference is held in Durban.
- 14 – South Africa signs a contract to acquire four new Super Lynx helicopters for operation from the new naval corvettes.
- 28 – Three parachuted pallets, dropped by a South African Air Force Casa 212 during a training mission, are blown off course and lands in a residential suburb of Gauteng, causing minor damage.

September

- 7–17 – The 5th World Parks Congress is held in Durban.

October

- 2 – The first South African Air Force BAE Hawk 120 (serial no. 250) makes its maiden flight at BAE Systems’ Warton, Fylde.
- 7 – South African Justice Ministry officials announce that the five policemen who were accused of killing Steve Biko in 1977 will not be prosecuted because of insufficient evidence.
- 8 – Domitien Ndayizeye, President of Burundi and Pierre Nkurunziza, the leader of a faction of the CNDD-FDD, sign an agreement in Pretoria under the facilitation of Thabo Mbeki, President of South Africa and Jacob Zuma, Deputy President of South Africa, to integrate the armed forces, the police and intelligence services of Burundi.
- 15–18 – President Thabo Mbeki holds bilateral talks with Atal Bihari Vajpayee, Prime Minister of India, while on a state visit to India.
- 17 – The first South African Air Force BAE Hawk 120 (serial no. 250) arrives in South Africa inside an Antonov An-22.
- 19 – The South African Competitions Commission finds two giant pharmaceutical companies, GlaxoSmithKline and Boehringer Ingelheim Pharmaceuticals, guilty of price fixing anti-retroviral drugs.

November

- 12 – A South African Air Force Impala Mk I jet trainer crashes next to the N4 highway between Nelspruit and Komatipoort. Pilots Lieutenant Paul Martin and Lieutenant Gert Duvenhage abort an emergency landing on the highway to avoid an oncoming truck and eject, but are both killed, one of them hitting the truck.

December

- 11 – The Sea Point, Cape Town home of Asher Karni, an Israeli and South African businessman who is alleged to have supplied nuclear technology to Pakistan, is raided by police.

Unknown date

- Sewsunker "Papwa" Sewgolum receives a posthumous achievement award from President Thabo Mbeki.

== Births ==
- 8 January - Clement Molobela, Media Personality
- 18 January - Wendy Shongwe, soccer player
- 28 July - Matthew Sates, Swimmer
- 11 November - Thapelo Maseko, soccer player

== Deaths ==
- 5 May – Walter Sisulu, South African political activist. (b. 1912)
- 31 May – Billy Wade, cricketer. (b. 1914)
- 15 June – Kaiser Matanzima, 1st President of Transkei. (b. 1915)
- 6 August –Larry Taylor, English actor and stuntman. (b. 1918)
- 9 August – Lesley Manyathela, footballer Orlando Pirates striker. (b. 1981)
- 13 September – Kenneth Walter, cricketer. (b. 1939)
- 4 November – Ken Gampu, actor. (b. 1929)
- 30 December – David Bale, South African-born English businessman and activist. (b. 1941)

== See also ==
- 2003 in South African television
