= 2001 in South Africa =

- Decades: 1980s; 1990s; 2000s; 2010s; 2020s
- See also: 2001 in South African sport; List of years in South Africa

The following lists events that happened during 2001 in South Africa.

== Incumbents ==
- President: Thabo Mbeki.
- Deputy President: Jacob Zuma.
- Chief Justice: vacant then Arthur Chaskalson.

=== Cabinet ===
The Cabinet, together with the President and the Deputy President, forms part of the Executive.

=== Provincial Premiers ===
- Eastern Cape Province: Makhenkesi Stofile
- Free State Province: Winkie Direko
- Gauteng Province: Mbhazima Shilowa
- KwaZulu-Natal Province: Lionel Mtshali
- Limpopo Province: Ngoako Ramathlodi
- Mpumalanga Province: Ndaweni Mahlangu
- North West Province: Popo Molefe
- Northern Cape Province: Manne Dipico
- Western Cape Province:
  - until 12 November: Gerald Morkel
  - 12 November-5 December: Cecil Herandien
  - since 5 December: Peter Marais

== Events ==
March

- 9 – The National plan for Higher Education is gazetted. The Act restructured higher education in the country, most notably in technikons and vocational institutions & it reduced the number of higher education institutions from 36 universities and technikons to 22 higher education institutions, leading to the formation of institutions such as the University of Johannesburg, Durban University of Technology, Walter Sisulu University & Cape Peninsula University of Technology.
- 18 – The Department of Health declines the offer of a large donation of HIV test kits made by Guardian Scientific Africa Incorporated.

April

- 5 – George Bizos is awarded the 2001 International Trial Lawyer Prize of the Year by the International Academy of Trial Lawyers.
- 11 – Pfizer Inc. agrees to supply AIDS patients attending public hospitals with an unlimited two-year supply of Fluconazole.
- 30 – South Africa and India sign a declaration of intent on co-operation in health and medicine.

June

- 11 – The Maloti-Drakensberg Transfrontier Conservation Area is signed into existence.
- 12–15 – President Thabo Mbeki undertakes a state visit to the United Kingdom.

September

- 1–8 – Durban hosts the World Conference against Racism.

October

- 4 – The first 40 of a planned 1000 elephants, including 3 breeding herds, are translocated from the over-populated Kruger National Park to the war-ravaged Limpopo National Park.
- 9 – The second South African National Census takes place.
- The name of the Gaza-Kruger-Gonarezhou Transfrontier Park is changed to the Great Limpopo Transfrontier Park.

December

- 4 – Marike de Klerk, ex-wife of former State President Frederik Willem de Klerk, is murdered in her flat in Bloubergrant.
- 27 – Mbongeni Ngema's controversial song "AmaNdiya" is banned by the Broadcasting Complaints Commission of South Africa.

Unknown date

- The New National Party withdraws from the Democratic Alliance.
- The Mavericks Cape Town gentlemen's club opens.

== Births ==
- 11 April – Jonathan Bird, cricketer
- 28 April – Sibulele Holweni, soccer player
- 5 May – Jayden Adams, soccer player (d. 2026)
- 9 May – Greteli Fincham, actress
- 12 June – Cassius Mailula, soccer player
- 18 August – Karabo Dhlamini, soccer player
- 25 August – Oswin Appollis, soccer player

== Deaths ==
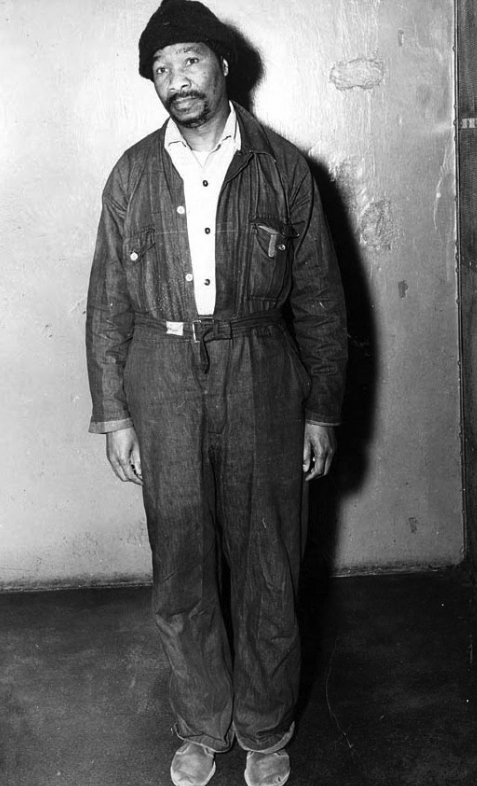
Govan Mbeki

- 26 April – Frederick Guy Butler, poet, academic and writer (b. 1918)
- 1 June – Nkosi Johnson, HIV/AIDS activist. (b. 1989)
- 13 August – Fanie du Plessis, athlete. (b. 1930)
- 19 August – Donald Woods, journalist and activist. (b. 1933)
- 30 August – Govan Mbeki, South African political activist and the father of Thabo Mbeki. (b. 1910)
- 2 September – Christiaan Barnard, cardiac surgeon. (b. 1922)
- 26 November – Joe Modise, South African political activist. (b. 1929)
- 3 December – Marike de Klerk, former first lady. (b. 1937)

== Railways ==
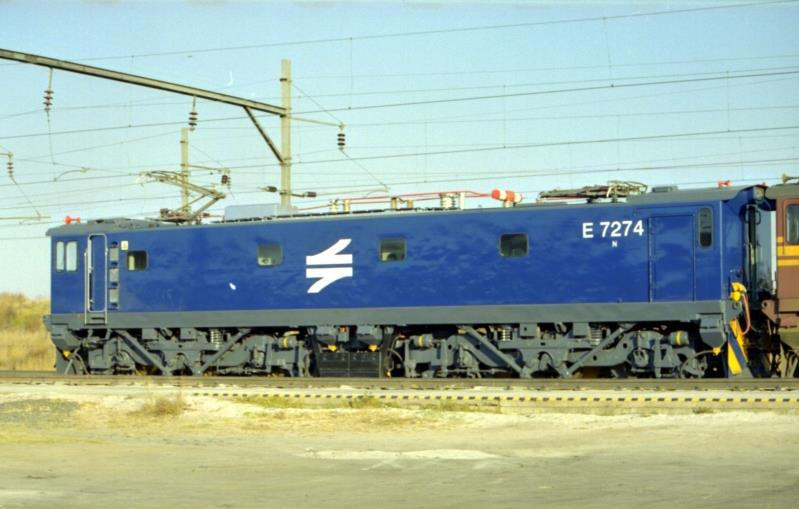
Class 7E4

=== Locomotives ===
- The first of seventeen Class 7E3, Series 1 and Series 2 dual-cab electric locomotives are rebuilt by Spoornet to single-cabs and enter service reclassified to Class 7E4.

== Sports ==
=== Athletics ===
- 4 March – Ian Syster wins his first national title in the men's marathon, clocking 2:13:30 in Durban.

== See also ==
- 2001 in South African television
