= 2002 in South Africa =

- Decades: 1980s; 1990s; 2000s; 2010s; 2020s
- See also: 2002 in South African sport; List of years in South Africa

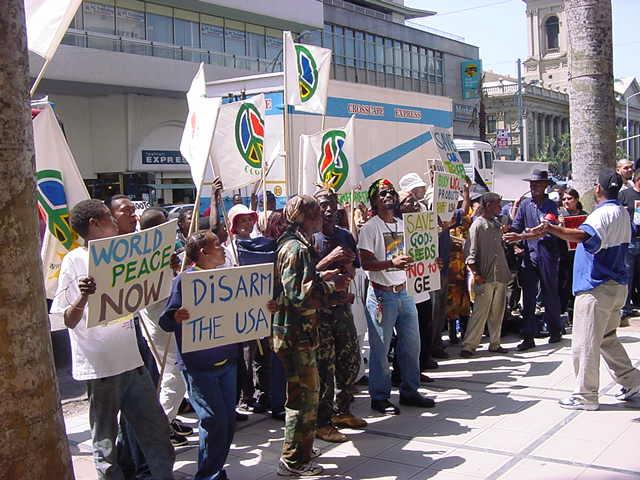
ECOPEACE Party Protest at the United States consulate in 2002

The following lists events that happened during 2002 in South Africa.

== Incumbents ==
- President: Thabo Mbeki.
- Deputy President: Jacob Zuma.
- Chief Justice: Arthur Chaskalson.

=== Cabinet ===
The Cabinet, together with the President and the Deputy President, forms part of the Executive.

=== Provincial Premiers ===
- Eastern Cape Province: Makhenkesi Stofile
- Free State Province: Winkie Direko
- Gauteng Province: Mbhazima Shilowa
- KwaZulu-Natal Province: Lionel Mtshali
- Limpopo Province: Ngoako Ramathlodi
- Mpumalanga Province: Ndaweni Mahlangu
- North West Province: Popo Molefe
- Northern Cape Province: Manne Dipico
- Western Cape Province:
  - until 3 June: Peter Marais
  - 3 June-21 June: Piet Meyer
  - since 21 June: Marthinus van Schalkwyk

== Events ==
January

- 29 – Doctors Without Borders, an international humanitarian organisation, begins importing a cheap generic version of patented AIDS drugs into South Africa in defiance of South Africa's patent laws.

February

- 9 – Bulelani Vukwana, an off-duty security guard, kills ten people and wounds others during a shooting spree in Mdantsane, near East London. The massacre - triggered by a failed relationship - ends when Vukwana kills himself, surrounded by police.

March

- 27 – Health Minister Manto Tshabalala-Msimang approaches the Constitutional Court to stop the issuing of Nevirapine.
- Sivan Pillay, Ed Jordan, Nkhensani Mangani and Karl Anderson are appointed as the first judges of reality show Coca-Cola Popstars, which yields two new pop groups, winners 101 and runners-up Afro Z.

April

- 25 – Mark Shuttleworth becomes the second self-funded spaceflight participant.
- 26 – A South African Air Force Impala Mk I jet crashes near the Albasini Dam between Louis Trichardt and Musina, killing pilot Captain Brett Burmeister.

May

- 20 – Health Minister Manto Tshabalala-Msimang announces at the World Health Assembly in Geneva that South Africa pledges R20 million to the Global Fund to Fight HIV/AIDS, tuberculosis and malaria.

June

- 16 – The Hector Pieterson Museum becomes the first museum to open in Soweto.
- 27 – Two South African Air Force Oryx helicopters, flying from the South African Antarctic research ship Agulhas, takes emergency food supplies and evacuates 21 Russian scientists from the German-owned Magdalena Oldendorff which has been trapped in ice off Antarctica since 16 June.

July

- 15 – Nelson Mandela calls on government and business leaders worldwide to find ways to provide access to treatment to people living with HIV/AIDS.

August

- 8 – The government announces the approval of an anti-retroviral roll-out plan.
- 9 – Ed Fagan leads a $50bn class action suit by a few apartheid-era victims against international firms and banks who profited from dealings with the apartheid government.
- 25 – The Medicines Control Council threatens to de-register Nevirapine unless further studies and appropriate documentation can show its efficacy in the prevention of mother-to-child transmission of HIV.

September

- 15 – Johan Pretorius, Boeremag member, is arrested and charged when he is found with a truckload of weapons and explosives in Lichtenburg.
- 20 – Boeremag members Dirk Hanekom and Henk van Zyl are arrested in Memel, Free State, but only Hanekom is charged.
- 22 – A South African Air Force Museum T-6G Harvard crashes into power lines during a flypast at Africa Aerospace and Defence 2002, being held at AFB Waterkloof, Pretoria. Pilot Colonel Jeff Earle escapes with minor injuries.

October

- 10 – President of South Africa Thabo Mbeki states that AIDS drugs are dangerously toxic to people and questions whether HIV or poverty is the true cause of Aids.
- 30 – Nine bombs explode in Soweto and one in Bronkhorstspruit. The Boeremag claims responsibility.

November

- 4 – Alleged Boeremag leader Tom Vorster is arrested in Pretoria for the October bombings.
- 22 – A bomb explodes at the Grand Central Airport in Midrand, Gauteng.
- 28 – A bomb explodes on a bridge on the border between KwaZulu-Natal and the Eastern Cape Provinces.

December

- 16–20 – The African National Congress holds its 51st National Conference in Stellenbosch.

== Births ==
- 19 January – Fikile Magama, soccer player
- 30 January – Tyla, singer
- 22 February – Sacha Feinberg-Mngomezulu, rugby player
- 19 March – Paballo Koza, actor
- 7 March – Diyen Chetty, soccer player

== Deaths ==
- 31 January – Bettie du Toit, trade unionist and anti-apartheid activist. (b.1910)
- 26 April – Steve Tshwete, activist and politician. (b. 1938)
- 15 May – Nellie Shabalala, musician. (b. 1953)
- 1 June – Hansie Cronje, cricketer. (b. 1969)
- 29 June – Stephen Fry, Springbok captain. (b. 1924)
- 12 November – Johannes Kerkorrel singer-songwriter and anti-apartheid activist (b. 1960)

== See also ==
- 2002 in South African television
