= 2002 in South African television =

This is a list of South African television related events from 2002.

== Events ==
- March - The South African version of Pop Idol debuts on M-Net.
- 17 June - Heinz Winckler wins the first season of Idols South Africa.
- June - Release date of Heinz Winckler's debut single, "Once in a Lifetime".
- 30 June - Bill Flynn is voted winner of Celebrity Big Brother.
- 13 October - Richard Cawood wins the second season of Big Brother.

== Debuts ==
=== Domestic ===
- March - Idols South Africa (M-Net) (2002–present)

=== International ===
- 10 January - (Australia) / (United States) Farscape (SABC3)
- 10 January - (United States) Law & Order: Special Victims Unit (SABC3)
- 29 January - (United States) The Guardian (M-Net)
- 31 January - (United States) 24 (M-Net)
- 7 February - (United States) According to Jim (SABC2)
- 2 April - (United States) Star Trek: Enterprise (Sci-Fi Channel)
- 1 May - (United Kingdom) My Family (SABC3)
- 14 May - (United States) Scrubs (M-Net)
- 15 July - (United States) The Parkers (SABC1)
- 18 July - (United States) Alias (M-Net)
- 30 July - (United States) Soul Food (SABC1)
- 4 August - (Canada) / (United States) Andromeda (SABC1)
- 7 August - (United States) Smallville (M-Net)
- 2 September - (United States) Off Centre (e.tv)
- 2 November - (United Kingdom) Spooks (SABC3)
- 7 November - (United States) One on One (SABC1)
- 9 November - (United States) The Bachelor (M-Net)
- 20 December - (Canada) / (United States) Mutant X (SABC3)
- 26 December - (Canada) / (United States) Sue Thomas: F.B.Eye (SABC2)
- 27 December - (United States) Band of Brothers (M-Net)
- (Germany) / (France) Mummy Nanny (M-Net)
- (United Kingdom) The Lampies (M-Net)
- (United Kingdom) Angelina Ballerina (M-Net)
- (United States) The Harveytoons Show (K-T.V. World)
- (United Kingdom) Spheriks (SABC2)
- (Australia) The Secret Life of Us (M-Net)
- (United Kingdom) Merlin the Magical Puppy (M-Net)
- (United States) Stanley (SABC1)
- (New Zealand) Buzz and Poppy (SABC2)
- (Canada) What About Mimi? (M-Net)
- (Australia) / (China) Tracey McBean (M-Net)
- (France) Totally Spies! (SABC2)
- (United States) Kim Possible (SABC1)
- (Japan) Medabots (SABC2)
- (United Kingdom) Fetch the Vet (M-Net)
- (United States) All About Us (M-Net)
- (Japan) Dragon Ball Z (SABC2)
- (France) / (Canada) Xcalibur (M-Net)
- (United States) The Proud Family (SABC1)
- (United States) Teamo Supremo (SABC1)
- (United Kingdom) Bill and Ben (M-Net)
- (United States) The Zeta Project (M-Net)
- (United States) Mary-Kate and Ashley in Action! (M-Net)
- (Canada) Rockabye Bubble (SABC2)
- (Australia) Outriders (M-Net)
- (United States) Lizzie McGuire (M-Net)
- (United States) Quack Pack (SABC1)
- (United Kingdom) Cubeez (M-Net)

=== Changes of network affiliation ===
Shows	Moved from	Moved to
(United States) The Sopranos	e.tv	M-Net Series
(Canada) / (France) Babar	K-T.V. World	M-Net
(United States) The Harveytoons Show	K-T.V. World	M-Net
(Canada) / (United Kingdom) My Best Friend is an Alien!	K-T.V. World	M-Net
(United Kingdom) / (Australia) The Genie from Down Under	Bop TV	M-Net
(United Kingdom) Bob the Builder (1999)	SABC2	M-Net
(United Kingdom) Kipper	SABC2	M-Net
(Canada) Bookmice	SABC2	Bop TV
(United States) The Brothers Flub	SABC2	e.tv
(United States) Cow and Chicken	M-Net	e.tv
(United States) The Wuzzles	M-Net	SABC1
(United States) Raw Toonage	M-Net	SABC1
(Canada) / (France) Mona the Vampire	M-Net	K-T.V. World
(United Kingdom) Bill and Ben	M-Net	K-T.V. World
(United Kingdom) / (United States) / (Canada) The Hoobs	M-Net	K-T.V. World
(United Kingdom) Fetch the Vet	M-Net	K-T.V. World
(Canada) / (China) A Miss Mallard Mystery	M-Net	K-T.V. World
(Canada) Shadow Raiders	M-Net	SABC2
Mina Moo	CCV-TV	SABC2
(Canada) Hello Mrs. Cherrywinkle	Bop TV	SABC2
(France) Marsupilami (2000)	K-T.V. World	SABC2
(United States) Aaahh!!! Real Monsters	K-T.V. World	e.tv

== Television shows ==
=== 1980s ===
- Good Morning South Africa (1985–present)
- Carte Blanche (1988–present)

=== 1990s ===
- Top Billing (1992–present)
- Generations (1994–present)
- Isidingo (1998–present)
- Who Wants to Be a Millionaire? (1999–2005)

== Ending this year ==
- Big Brother (2001-2002, 2014–present)

== See also ==
- 2002 in South Africa
