= 2003 in South African television =

This is a list of South African television related events from 2003.

== Events ==
- 31 July - Bop TV shuts down.
- 19 October - Anke Pietrangeli wins the second season of Idols South Africa.

== Debuts ==
=== International ===
- 13 January - (United Kingdom) Footballers' Wives (SABC 3)
- 30 January - (United States) The Shield (SABC 3)
- 20 February - (United States) Birds of Prey (M-Net)
- 10 March - (United States) Everwood (M-Net)
- 14 March - (United States) / (Canada) Jeremiah (SABC 3)
- 24 March - (United States) The Dead Zone (SABC 3)
- 31 March - (United States) What I Like About You (M-Net)
- 1 April - (United States) The Bernie Mac Show (SABC 1)
- 1 April - (United Kingdom) The Office (UK) (SABC 3)
- 15 April - (United States) Firefly (SABC 3)
- 26 May - (United States) American Idol (M-Net Series)
- 19 June - (United States) Monk (SABC 2)
- 1 July - (United States) CSI: Miami (M-Net)
- 7 July - (United States) The Wire (M-Net)
- 23 July - (United States) Curb Your Enthusiasm (e.tv)
- 24 October - (United States) Without a Trace (M-Net)
- (United States) Stuart Little (SABC 1)
- (Japan) Beyblade (SABC 1)
- (United Kingdom) Dr Otter (M-Net)
- (United Kingdom) Teletubbies Everywhere (SABC 2)
- (United States) / (Canada) Cyberchase (SABC 1)
- (Canada) Moville Mysteries (SABC 1)
- (United Kingdom) Eddy and the Bear (M-Net)
- (United States) The Fairly OddParents! (M-Net)
- (United Kingdom) Two Pints of Lager and a Packet of Crisps (BBC Prime)
- (Canada) / (United States) / (France) What's with Andy? (M-Net)
- (United Kingdom) The Story of Tracy Beaker (SABC 1)
- (United States) Liberty's Kids (M-Net)
- (United Kingdom) Gypsy Girl (M-Net)
- (United States) Teenage Mutant Ninja Turtles (2003) (M-Net)
- (United States) Life with Bonnie (M-Net)
- (Canada) Yvon of the Yukon (M-Net)
- (Japan) Transformers: Armada (SABC 2)
- (United Kingdom) Kerching! (M-Net)
- (United States) / (Canada) Sitting Ducks (M-Net)
- (United Kingdom) Preston Pig (M-Net)
- (United States) Scaredy Camp (M-Net)
- (United Kingdom) Fimbles (SABC 1)
- (United States) / (Canada) Dragon Tales (SABC 1)
- (Canada) / (Hong Kong) Eckhart (SABC 1)
- (United States) The Adventures of Jimmy Neutron: Boy Genius (M-Net)
- (United Kingdom) / (Canada) Ace Lightning (M-Net)
- (South Korea) Cubix (M-Net)
- (United States) Nightmare Ned (SABC 1)
- (United Kingdom) Little Robots (SABC 2)
- (United States) State of Grace (M-Net)

=== Changes of network affiliation ===
Shows	Moved from	Moved to
(United Kingdom) Bob the Builder (1999)	M-Net	K-T.V. World
(France) / (Canada) Wunschpunsch	M-Net	K-T.V. World
(United States) Liberty's Kids	M-Net	K-T.V. World
(United Kingdom) The Cubeez	M-Net	K-T.V. World
(United Kingdom) Angelina Ballerina	M-Net	K-T.V. World
(Japan) Dinozaurs	M-Net	K-T.V. World
(Canada) What About Mimi?	M-Net	K-T.V. World
(South Korea) / (United States) / (Canada) Milo's Bug Quest	M-Net	K-T.V. World
(United States) Barney and Friends	M-Net	K-T.V. World
(United States) Mary-Kate and Ashley in Action!	M-Net	K-T.V. World
(United Kingdom) Kipper	M-Net	K-T.V. World
(Germany) / (France) Mummy Nanny	M-Net	K-T.V. World
(United Kingdom) The Lampies	M-Net	K-T.V. World
(Canada) / (China) Marvin the Tap-Dancing Horse	M-Net	K-T.V. World
(United States) Cow and Chicken	e.tv	K-T.V. World
(Australia) The New Adventures of Ocean Girl	K-T.V. World	SABC 1
(United States) Rugrats	K-T.V. World	M-Net
(United States) The Wild Thornberrys	K-T.V. World	M-Net
(Belgium) / (France) / (Canada) Billy the Cat	K-T.V. World	M-Net
(United States) Rocket Power	K-T.V. World	M-Net
(United States) As Told by Ginger	K-T.V. World	M-Net
(United States) Hey Arnold!	K-T.V. World	M-Net
(United States) The Brothers Garcia	K-T.V. World	M-Net
(United Kingdom) Postman Pat	SABC 2	M-Net
(United Kingdom) The World of Peter Rabbit and Friends	SABC 2	M-Net
(United Kingdom) The Caribou Kitchen	SABC 2	M-Net
(United Kingdom) Renford Rejects	SABC 2	M-Net
(United Kingdom) The Forgotten Toys	SABC 2	M-Net
(United States) Jay Jay the Jet Plane	Bop TV	M-Net
(United States) Johnny Bravo	e.tv	M-Net
(United States) The West Wing	e.tv	M-Net Series
(United States) Spin City	SABC 3	M-Net Series
(United States) Judging Amy	SABC 2	M-Net Series
(United States) Girlfriends	SABC 1	M-Net Series
(United States) The Stand (1994)	SABC 1	Sci-Fi Channel
(United States) 101 Dalmatians: The Series	SABC 1	SABC 2
(United States) The Lion King's Timon & Pumbaa	SABC 1	SABC 2
(United States) Buzz Lightyear of Star Command	SABC 1	SABC 2
(United States) SpongeBob SquarePants	K-T.V. World	SABC 2
(Canada) / (China) Braceface	K-T.V. World	SABC 2
(Canada) The Big Comfy Couch	Bop TV	SABC 2

== Television shows ==
=== 1980s ===
- Good Morning South Africa (1985–present)
- Carte Blanche (1988–present)

=== 1990s ===
- Top Billing (1992–present)
- Generations (1994–present)
- Isidingo (1998–present)
- Who Wants to Be a Millionaire? (1999-2005)

=== 2000s ===
- Idols South Africa (2002–present)

== New channels ==
- 14 July - Africa Magic
- 1 August - Vuzu

== Defunct channels ==
- 31 July - Bop TV

== See also ==
- 2003 in South Africa
