= 2008 in South African television =

This is a list of South African television related events from 2008.

== Events ==
- 20 March - Erfsondes actor Emmanuel Castis and his partner Lindsey Muckle win the fourth season of Strictly Come Dancing.
- 1 July - The Nickelodeon Channel launches in South Africa. The channel includes many of Nickelodeon's famous shows including the Nicktoons that were most previously aired on its Nickelodeon block on K-T.V. World since 1999.
- 4 December - The Crazy Games presenter and comedian Rob van Vuuren and his partner Mary Martin win the fifth season of Strictly Come Dancing.

== Debuts ==
=== Domestic ===
- 7 January - The Biggest Loser (e.tv) (2008)
- 27 January - Are You Smarter than a 5th Grader? (M-Net) (2008)
- 29 August - Where Were You? (SABC 2) (2008)

=== International ===
- 9 January - (United States) The Big Bang Theory (M-Net)
- 15 January - (United States) Damages (M-Net)
- 22 January - (United States) Pushing Daisies (M-Net)
- 24 January - (United States) Private Practice (M-Net)
- 1 February - (United States) Phineas and Ferb (Disney Channel)
- 4 February - (United States) K-Ville (M-Net Action)
- 7 February - (United Kingdom) Supernova (BBC Prime)
- 8 February - (United Kingdom) / (Republic of Ireland) Skunk Fu! (Cartoon Network)
- 29 February - (United States) Wizards of Waverly Place (Disney Channel)
- 3 March - (United States) George of the Jungle (Cartoon Network)
- 5 March - (United States) October Road (M-Net Series)
- 5 March - (United States) Samantha Who? (M-Net)
- 27 March - (United States) Life (M-Net)
- 28 March - (United States) / (United Kingdom) / (Australia) / (Canada) Animalia (SABC2)
- 1 April - (United Kingdom) Drop Dead Gorgeous (BBC Prime)
- 7 April - (United Kingdom) Earth: The Power of the Planet (SABC2)
- 15 April - (United States) Californication (M-Net)
- 15 April - (United States) Saving Grace (M-Net)
- 16 April - (United States) Battlestar Galactica: Razor (M-Net Action)
- 28 April - (United States) Tyler Perry's House of Payne (SABC1)
- 5 May - (United States) Intervention (Zone Reality)
- 5 May - (United Kingdom) My Spy Family (Cartoon Network)
- 5 May - (United States) Breaking Bad (M-Net Action)
- 6 May - (United States) Terminator: The Sarah Connor Chronicles (M-Net)
- 10 May - (France) / (United Kingdom) Eliot Kid (Cartoon Network)
- 12 May - (United States) Chowder (Cartoon Network)
- 13 May - (United Kingdom) Life on Mars (UK) (BBC Prime)
- 19 May - (Canada) The Vice Guide to Travel (MTV Base)
- 25 May - (United States) Mad Men (M-Net)
- 25 May - (United States) The X's (M-Net)
- 1 June - (United Kingdom) Haunted Homes (Zone Reality)
- 2 June - (United States) Army Wives (M-Net)
- 4 June - (United States) Chuck (M-Net)
- 9 June - (United Kingdom) The Apprentice (UK) (BBC Prime)
- 12 June - (United States) Eli Stone (M-Net)
- 14 June - (United Kingdom) / (France) Famous 5: On the Case (Disney Channel)
- 24 June - (United States) New Amsterdam (2008) (M-Net Action)
- 4 July - (United Kingdom) The Cannibal That Walked Free (Zone Reality)
- 4 July - (United Kingdom) Low Winter Sun (UK) (BBC Prime)
- 4 July - (Canada) The Adrenaline Project (Go)
- 11 July - (United States) Carpoolers (M-Net)
- 29 July - (United States) Reaper (M-Net)
- 4 August - (United Kingdom) Derren Brown: Something Wicked This Way Comes (BBC Prime)
- 11 August - (New Zealand) bro'Town (Go)
- 22 August - (United States) Moonlight (M-Net Action)
- 25 August - (Canada) She's Crafty (The Home Channel)
- 25 August - (United Kingdom) Kylie: The Interview (Go)
- 27 August - (United States) Swingtown (M-Net Series)
- 31 August - (United States) Clash of the Choirs (M-Net)
- 1 September - (United Kingdom) / (Canada) Chop Socky Chooks (Cartoon Network)
- 3 September - (United States) Burn Notice (M-Net)
- 4 September - (Republic of Ireland) Home Salvage (The Home Channel)
- 4 September - (Canada) Total Drama Island (Cartoon Network)
- 29 September - (United States) Lipstick Jungle (SABC3)
- 2 October - (New Zealand) Orange Roughies (Go)
- 6 October - (United Kingdom) Little Miss Jocelyn (Go)
- 9 October - (United States) The Return of Jezebel James (M-Net)
- 9 October - (United States) Miss Guided (Go)
- 10 October - (United States) The Moment of Truth (M-Net Series)
- 10 October - (United States) Cavemen (M-Net)
- 12 October - (United States) Tracey Ullman's State of the Union (M-Net)
- 16 October - (United States) Greek (Go)
- 17 October - (United States) The Secret Life of the American Teenager (Go)
- 27 October - (Canada) The Guard (M-Net Series)
- 11 November - (United States) Sons of Anarchy (M-Net)
- 14 November - (United States) Don't Forget the Lyrics! (M-Net Series)
- 17 November - (United States) Big Shots (SABC3)
- 17 November - (United States) The Bill Engvall Show (M-Net)
- 26 November - (United States) In Treatment (M-Net Series)
- 2 December - (United States) Raising the Bar (M-Net)
- 3 December - (United States) Cashmere Mafia (M-Net)
- 11 December - (United States) Rules of Engagement (SABC3)
- 12 December - (United States) Fear Itself (M-Net Action)
- (Canada) Bo on the Go! (M-Net)
- (United Kingdom) Roary the Racing Car (M-Net)
- (United Kingdom) Little Princess (M-Net)
- (United Kingdom) The Beeps (M-Net)
- (United Kingdom) / (United States) Finley the Fire Engine (SABC3)
- (Canada) Will and Dewitt (SABC2)
- (United Kingdom) / (United States) The Mr. Men Show (M-Net)
- (France) Hairy Scary (M-Net)
- (United States) DinoSquad (M-Net)
- (United States) / (United Kingdom) / (Republic of Ireland) / (Canada) The Tudors (M-Net)
- (Canada) Being Ian (M-Net)
- (United Kingdom) Rupert Bear, Follow the Magic... (K-T.V. World)
- (South Korea) / (Canada) Magi-Nation (SABC2)
- (United Kingdom) In the Night Garden... (CBeebies)
- (United Kingdom) Charlie and Lola (CBeebies)

=== Changes of network affiliation ===
Shows	Moved from	Moved to
(Canada) Toad Patrol	M-Net	SABC 2
(United States) Californication	M-Net	M-Net Series
(United States) Side Order of Life	M-Net	M-Net Series
(United States) Army Wives	M-Net	M-Net Series
(United States) Life	M-Net	M-Net Series
(United States) The Starter Wife (2007)	M-Net	M-Net Series
(United States) Damages	M-Net	M-Net Series
(United States) Raising the Bar	M-Net	M-Net Series
(United States) Mad Men	M-Net	M-Net Series
(United States) Saving Grace	M-Net	M-Net Series
(United States) Burn Notice	M-Net	M-Net Action
(United States) Terminator: The Sarah Connor Chronicles	M-Net	M-Net Action
(United States) Dexter	M-Net	M-Net Action
(United States) Ugly Betty	M-Net	Go
(United States) Day Break	M-Net	Go
(United States) Reaper	M-Net	Go
(United States) The Big Bang Theory	M-Net	Go
(United States) Chuck	M-Net	Go
(United States) State of Mind	M-Net	Go
(United States) The Tick (1994)	M-Net	SABC 1
(United States) My Little Pony	M-Net	K-T.V. World
(United States) DinoSquad	M-Net	K-T.V. World
(Canada) Bo on the Go!	M-Net	K-T.V. World
(Italy) / (United States) Double Dragon	M-Net	e.tv
(United States) / (France) / (Canada) Inspector Gadget	M-Net	e.tv
(United States) Rugrats	M-Net	e.tv
(France) / (United States) Pole Position	M-Net	e.tv
(United States) The Real Ghostbusters	Bop TV	e.tv
(United States) / (France) / (Canada) Care Bears	Bop TV	e.tv
(United States) / (France) The Get Along Gang	Bop TV	e.tv
(United States) / (France) Dennis the Menace	SABC 1	e.tv
(United States) My Name Is Earl	M-Net Series	e.tv
(United States) Garfield and Friends	K-T.V. World	e.tv
(United States) Ripley's Believe It or Not! (2000)	SABC 3	e.tv
(United States) Popples (1986)	TV1	e.tv
(United Kingdom) Paddington	TV1	K-T.V. World
(United States) Hannah Montana	Disney Channel	SABC 3
(United States) Prison Break	M-Net Series	SABC 3
(United States) / (Canada) Dragon Tales	SABC 1	SABC 3
(United States) NYPD Blue	SABC 1	M-Net Series
(Canada) Cold Squad	SABC 2	M-Net Series
(United Kingdom) Little Robots	SABC 2	CBeebies
(United States) Medium	SABC 2	M-Net Action
(United States) The Wire	e.tv	M-Net Action
(United States) The Amazing Race	SABC 3	Sony Channel
(United States) According to Jim	SABC 2	SABC 3

== Television shows ==
=== 1980s ===
- Good Morning South Africa (1985–present)
- Carte Blanche (1988–present)

=== 1990s ===
- Top Billing (1992–present)
- Generations (1994–present)
- Isidingo (1998–present)

=== 2000s ===
- Idols South Africa (2002–present)
- Rhythm City (2007–present)

== New channels ==
- 1 June - eNCA (eNews Channel until 19 August 2012)
- 1 July - Nickelodeon
- September - Cape Town TV

== Ending this year ==
- Strictly Come Dancing (2006-2008, 2013–2015)
- Deal or No Deal (2007-2008)

== See also ==
- 2008 in South Africa
