= Nahum Manbar =

Israeli businessman (born 1946)

- נחום מנבר
- Born: April 18, 1946 (age 80); Givat Haim, Mandatory Palestine
- Occupation: Businessman

Nahum Manbar (Hebrew: נחום מנבר) is an Israeli businessman who was involved in arms trade with Iran. He was convicted in series of crimes against Israel's national security and served 14.5 years in prison, prior to his release in October 2011.

== Early life ==
Manbar was born in kibbutz Givat Haim in 1946. His parents were among the founders of the kibbutz. At age 16, he was in the reserve squad of the Israeli national basketball team. He served as an officer in the Paratroopers Brigade after being conscripted into the Israel Defense Forces (IDF). He also served as an instructor at the IDF Officers' College. Manbar fought in the Six-Day War, War of Attrition, and Yom Kippur War. During the Yom Kippur War, he saved the life of Hanoch Saar, who would later serve on his defense team.

== Career ==
After his military service, Manbar moved to Tel Aviv and opened up a series of businesses. His business ventures mostly ended with police investigations and indictments for crimes such as fraud, passing bad checks, and stealing checks from government employees. In 1984 he fled to the United Kingdom after being indicted for fraud, imposture, and theft, and was declared by Israel to be a fugitive from justice. He then began selling produce at the Covent Garden market in London, but soon left Britain and entered the arms trade. He set up weapons companies in Poland and France. During his career as an arms trader, he lived in France and Switzerland before settling in Poland and setting up his headquarters in Warsaw. Some of the weapons Manbar sold were purchased from the Polish Army. In 1994 he became a sponsor of Hapoel Jerusalem B.C.

Manbar sold arms to Iran, establishing contacts in the Iranian Defense Ministry. According to the charges at his trial, Manbar made contact through an Iranian mediator with Majed Abasbur, then the head of the Iranian chemical weapons development project. A deal was signed between Manbar's Mana Investments International company and Iran's section 105B, represented by Abasbur. Manbar initially sold Iran a small number of shoulder-launched anti-aircraft missiles. Through this deal, he became acquainted with Polish Defense Minister Florian Siwicki. Manbar later sold offensive weaponry such as T-55 tanks purchased from the Polish military to Iran, explaining that "I would buy, say, T-55 tanks from the Polish army for $35,000 apiece, install some fire-control system I had bought from Israel for $20,000 apiece, and sell them to the Iranians for $200,000. The profits were fantastic".

Between 1992 and 1993, Manbar provided Iran with ingredients needed to make chemical weapons, equipment and expertise, and was paid $16 million by 1994 after providing elements of mustard gas and three types of nerve gas: Tabun, Sarin and Soman, and set up a plant in Poland to manufacture chemical weaponry for Iran. He obtained the raw materials necessary to make chemical weapons that he sold to Iran from China and Hungary. He also provided Iran with information and know-how to produce mustard gas. The indictment stated that he had not reported to Israeli intelligence about his contacts until August 1992, despite several meetings with members of the security forces. Despite committing himself to stop his illegal activity, he continued to do so for over a year. Manbar, however, claims that he informed Israeli authorities of his activities, and that his arms sales to Iran were approved by the Israeli Defense Ministry. However, Manbar offered Israel information on military subjects, and also offered to use the high-level links he had with the Iranians to reveal the fate of Ron Arad, exploiting Mossad's desperation for any information on his fate. Manbar supplied the Mossad with a faked video and worthless leads. Manbar's activities, some of which were conducted in Britain, drew the attention of MI6, which could not believe that an Israeli could be working so closely with Iran and concluded that Manbar was a Mossad agent trying to penetrate Iran's defense establishment.

Mossad began to investigate Manbar's dealings, and as part of the investigation, Mossad agents shadowed Abasbur. On May 27, 1993, Manbar and Abasbur met at the Marriott Hotel in Vienna. Abasbur was tailed by two Mossad agents, and on his way there, he noticed he was being followed. When Abasbur arrived, he told Manbar of the agents, and Manbar then confronted them and insinuated that he knew who they were, while Abasbur, realizing that he had been discovered, left for an Iranian Embassy safe house. The two agents followed Abasbur's car on a motorcycle, but due to heavy rain, they found it difficult to keep up with him, and as they emerged from an underpass, their motorcycle overturned. A car ran over the agents and killed them both. Their deaths reportedly increased the anger towards Manbar by the Israeli security services.

In 1994, he was accused by the US government of selling components for mustard gas and nerve gas to Iran in defiance of a US embargo and was barred from entering the United States.

In 1997, Deputy Attorney-General for Security Affairs Dvorah Chen concluded that she could prosecute Manbar for harming the security of the state and aiding the enemy in war against Israel. Mossad officials managed to persuade a Polish businessman who served as his right-hand man to agree to testify against him. On March 27, 1997, Manbar arrived in Israel to watch Hapoel Jerusalem compete for the State Cup. Upon arrival, he was arrested by Shin Bet and the Serious Crimes Unit of the Israel Police. His detention was initially placed under a gag order, and was cleared for publication several weeks later. In May he was indicted and his case was brought before the Tel Aviv District Court.

== Trial ==
Manbar's trial began on 15 May. The trial was held behind closed doors, and much of the testimony was classified. His defense was based on the case that he did not act alone, and that Israeli businessmen were being allowed to sell weapons to Iran by the security authorities.

On July 16, 1998, he was unanimously convicted of collaboration with an enemy and providing information to an enemy. The court rejected his claims for lack of criminal intent and established that he had known about Abasbur's senior position. He was sentenced to 16 years in prison. He served his sentence at Nitzan Prison in Ramla, and later at HaSharon Prison at the Hadarim Interchange.

Manbar appealed to the Supreme Court of Israel but his appeal was denied on December 5, 2000. In 2007 applied a request for parole, having been described as a well-behaved prisoner. However, the Shin Bet and Mossad objected, and in early 2008 his request was denied by the Jerusalem District Court. It was argued that he might be recruited by Iran.

=== Controversy ===
The trial was laden with controversy. Manbar's attorney, Amnon Zichroni, alleged that Prime Minister Benjamin Netanyahu had contacted the presiding judge in the case, Amnon Straschnov, to lobby for a harsh sentence for Manbar. Netanyahu's office denied the allegations. Zichroni further alleged that a female member of his defense team, attorney Pninat Yanai, passed along privileged information about Manbar to Straschnov—with whom, Zichroni claimed, she was having a sexual affair. Yanai, who had been fired from her duties and was also a friend of Netanyahu's spokesman, denied those allegations as well.

Ex-Mossad agent Victor Ostrovsky pointed out that Manbar was given a small pool of lawyers to choose from and that the trial was conducted behind closed doors. He also said Manbar had contacts in the Israeli security services and that several deals with Iran had been made in the past.

Others also considered it a link in a chain of shady deals between Israel and Iran that goes back to the Iran–Contra affair, and that he had taken the fall for the Israeli military and security industry.

== Personal life ==
In France, Manbar met a French woman, Francine. They married on April 21, 1992, and had a son.

Francine gave the Mossad information on her previous husband's dealings with the Condor Argentine Missile Program before her marriage. On March 2, 2010, the couple obtained a divorce (Tel Aviv District Family Court DMC 13120-07).

In 2003, while still in prison, Manbar was declared bankrupt, and appointed a trustee.

== See also ==
- Asher Karni
- Iran–Israel relations
- Iran and weapons of mass destruction
