= 2005 in South African television =

This is a list of South African television related events from 2005.

== Events ==
- 1 March - Cartoon Network launches its very first Boomerang channel in South Africa.
- 27 November - Karin Kortje wins the third season of Idols South Africa.

== Debuts ==
=== Domestic ===
- 13 October - Binnelanders (M-Net/kykNET) (2005–2009)
- Going Nowhere Slowly (SABC3)

=== International ===
- 8 January - (United Kingdom) Foyle's War (M-Net)
- 31 January - (United States) Dave the Barbarian (e.tv)
- 3 February - (United States) Rescue Me (M-Net)
- 5 February - (United States) Lost (M-Net)
- 6 February - (United States) Arrested Development (E.tv)
- 24 February - (United States) The 4400 (M-Net)
- 2 March - (United States) Joey (M-Net)
- 2 March - (United States) Two and a Half Men (M-Net)
- 28 March - (United States) 8 Simple Rules (SABC3)
- 7 April - (United States) Desperate Housewives (M-Net)
- 15 May - (United States) / (Republic of Ireland) / (United Kingdom) Jakers! The Adventures of Piggley Winks (M-Net)
- 8 July - (United States) The Bachelorette (M-Net Series)
- 20 October - (United States) House (M-Net)
- 16 November - (United States) The Closer (M-Net)
- (United Kingdom) Fifi and the Flowertots (M-Net)
- (United Kingdom) Top Gear (BBC Prime)
- (United States) Brandy and Mister Whiskers (E.tv)
- (United States) American Dragon (E.tv)
- (Canada) 6teen (SABC2)
- (United Kingdom) New Captain Scarlet (M-Net)
- (United Kingdom) Legend of the Dragon (M-Net)
- (United Kingdom) Little Red Tractor (M-Net)
- (Japan) Mew Mew Power (M-Net)
- (United Kingdom) Peppa Pig (SABC2)
- (Sweden) / (France) Creepschool (M-Net)
- (France) / (United States) W.I.T.C.H. (M-Net)
- (Japan) Transformers: Energon (SABC2)
- (United Kingdom) Boohbah (SABC2)
- (United Kingdom) The Catherine Tate Show (BBC Prime)
- (United Kingdom) Funky Valley (M-Net)
- (Republic of Ireland) The Island of Inis Cool (M-Net)
- (Canada) / (United States) The Save-Ums! (K-T.V World)

=== Changes of network affiliation ===
Shows	Moved from	Moved to
(Canada) / (France) Mona the Vampire	K-T.V. World	SABC2
(United States) Without a Trace	M-Net	SABC2
(Canada) / (France) Babar	M-Net	SABC2
(United States) Smallville	M-Net	SABC2
(United Kingdom) / (Canada) Ace Lightning	M-Net	E.tv
(United States) Secret Files of the SpyDogs	M-Net	E.tv
(United States) Dastardly and Muttley in Their Flying Machines	Cartoon Network	Boomerang
(United States) Wacky Races	Cartoon Network	Boomerang
(United States) Captain Caveman and the Teen Angels	Cartoon Network	Boomerang
(United States) Inch High Private Eye	Cartoon Network	Boomerang
(United States) Help!... It's the Hair Bear Bunch!	Cartoon Network	Boomerang

== Television shows ==
=== 1980s ===
- Good Morning South Africa (1985–present)
- Carte Blanche (1988–present)

=== 1990s ===
- Top Billing (1992–present)
- Generations (1994–present)
- Isidingo (1998–present)

=== 2000s ===
- Idols South Africa (2002–present)

== New channels ==
- Unknown - MK
- 22 February - MTV Base (continent-wide)
- 1 March - Boomerang
- 26 November - Soweto TV

== Ending this year ==
- Who Wants to Be a Millionaire? (1999–2005)

== See also ==
- 2005 in South Africa
