= 16th World Economic Forum on Africa =

The 16th World Economic Forum on Africa: Going for Growth was a World Economic Forum economic summit meeting held in Cape Town, South Africa, from May 31 to June 2, 2006. The summit was attended by some 650 political and business leaders from 39 countries, focusing particularly on rapidly increasing African commodity prices. It also examined issues relating to the promotion of investment, improving world opinion, combating hunger, sustainable development, and offer specific initiatives to address these and other economic issues facing part of or the entire continent.

== Notable participants ==
Among the prominent participants were:

  - Thabo Mbeki, President of South Africa (host)
  - Armando Guebuza, President of Mozambique
  - Jakaya Kikwete, President of Tanzania
  - Syamal Gupta, Chairman of Tata International, India
  - Jim Goodnight, Chief Executive Officer, SAS Institute, United States
  - Maria Ramos, Chief Executive Officer, Transnet, South Africa
  - Charles Chukwuma Soludo, Governor of the Central Bank of Nigeria

== Initiatives ==
In addition to examining the impact of the expanding Chinese and Indian economies on the rise of commodity prices in Africa, the summit addressed several specific economic, developmental, and financial initiatives:

  - The African Investment Climate Facility: A new mixed public-private venture was initiated as a mechanism to encourage investment in the continent. The African Development Bank agreed to take the lead facilitating panAfrican infrastructure projects.
  - Changing perceptions of Africa: This initiative was designed to address and improve on the generally negative perceptions suffered by the African continent.
  - Initiative to Reduce Hunger: This proposed "Business Alliance to Reduce Chronic Hunger" was considered as a mixed private-public venture to address "the root problems of hunger."
  - Energy Poverty Action: The Energy Poverty Action WEF taskforce was set up to test a pilot model for developing grid and off-grid electrification for different parts of the continent.
  - "Strengthening Healthcare Systems" proposal: This proposal was designed toward promoting a mixed private-public healthcare system in sub-Saharan Africa.
  - Partnering Against Corruption Initiative: The PACI seeks to curb corruption, by having businesses commit to a "zero tolerance" of corruption.
  - Water Initiative: This initiative was designed to expand private participation in Southern African water resources and needs.
  - Social entrepreneurs: The Schwab Foundation for Social Entrepreneurship named Sunette Pienaar the South African Social Entrepreneur of 2006.

== See also ==
- Economy of Africa
