= South African Class 39-200 =

Type of diesel locomotive

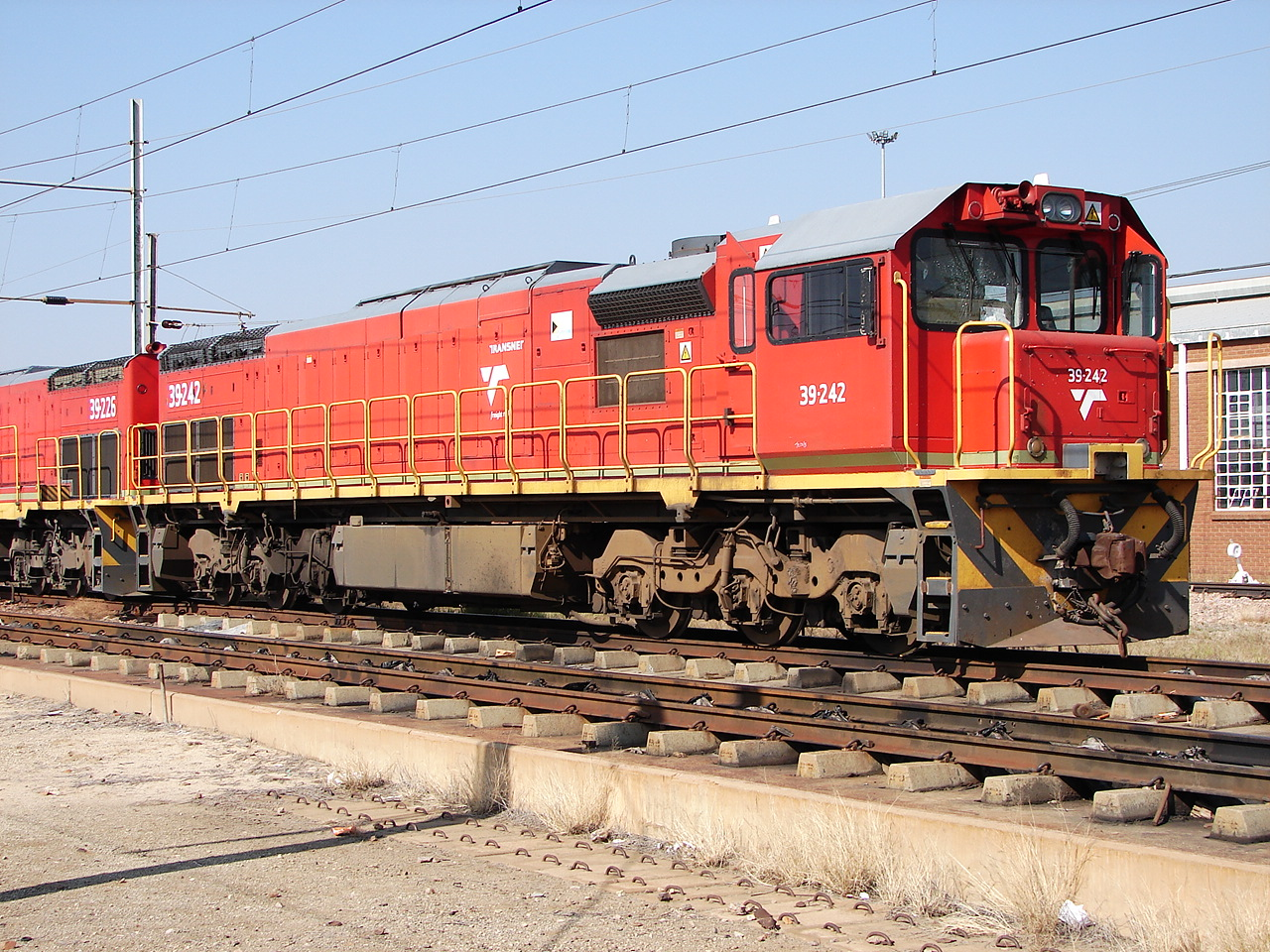
- No. 39-242 at Pyramid South, Pretoria, 14 May 2013
Type and origin
- Power type: Diesel-electric
- Designer: Electro-Motive Diesel
- Builder: Transnet Rail Engineering
- Model: EMD GT26CU-3
- Build date: 2009–2010
- Total produced: 50
Specifications
- Configuration
  - AAR: C-C
  - UIC: Co'Co'
  - Commonwealth: Co+Co
- Gauge: 3 ft 6 in (1,067 mm) Cape gauge
- Wheel diameter: 1,016 mm (40.0 in)
- Fuel type: Diesel
- Prime mover: EMD 16-645E3B
- Engine type: 2-stroke diesel
- Traction motors: Six EMD D43 DC
- Cylinders: V16
- Loco brake: Air & Dynamic braking
- Train brakes: Air & Vacuum
- Couplers: AAR knuckle
Career
- Operators: Transnet Freight Rail
- Class: Class 39-200
- Number in class: 50
- Numbers: 39-201 to 39-250
- Delivered: 2009–2010
- First run: 2009

The Transnet Freight Rail Class 39-200 of 2009 is a South African diesel-electric locomotive.

Near the end of 2009, the first of fifty Class 39-200 Electro-Motive Diesel type GT26CU-3 diesel-electric locomotives were placed in service by Transnet Freight Rail. The locomotives were built new after an earlier project to rebuild older locomotives to Class 39-000 locomotives was aborted.

== Manufacture ==
=== The Class 39-000 project ===
In 2005, Transwerk, later renamed Transnet Rail Engineering (TRE) and in 2013 Transnet Engineering, commenced a project to rebuild existing locomotives to Class 39-000 locomotives for Spoornet. The Electro-Motive Diesel type EMD GT26CU-3 diesel-electric locomotives were to be rebuilt from Classes 34-600 and 34-800 type GT26MC and Class 37-000 type GT26M2C locomotives. The original locomotives had all been designed by General Motors Electro-Motive Division (GM-EMD) and had been built by General Motors South Africa (GMSA) in Port Elizabeth between 1974 and 1981. Suitable frames from wrecked locomotives were used.

The rebuilding was done at the Transwerk shops in Bloemfontein. It was intended to produce one hundred Class 39-000s, but in spite of the technical success of the TRE part of the project, rebuilding was halted after completing only five locomotives, allegedly due to higher than anticipated cost. Instead of rebuilding one hundred old locomotives, it was decided to rather continue the program by building fifty new Class 39-200 locomotives.

=== The new Class 39-200 ===
The Class 39-200 locomotives were built new from imported and locally produced components at the Koedoespoort TRE shops east of Pretoria, in collaboration with EMD. By October 2009, more than twenty locomotives had been built and were undergoing road testing. By April 2010, the last of the fifty locomotives came off the production line, thereby completing the building project in twelve months. They were numbered in the range from 39-201 to 39-250.

== Features ==
Characteristics which distinguish the Class 39-200 from the existing TFR diesel-electric locomotive fleet, which was more than three decades old at the time, are features such as EM2000 microprocessor control, 26% more maximum continuous tractive effort and 15% more tractive horsepower compared to a Class 37-000, and a Knorr-Bremse electronic brake rack (EBR) instead of the old pneumatic braking controls.

The EM2000 control system featured in the Class 39-200 is a proprietary EMD microprocessor-based system which offers improved performance and reliability compared with older locomotives. It manages all critical operating functions and greatly improves tractive effort, while its creep control attains high- and low-speed adhesion advantages.

== Service ==
The Class 39-200 locomotives were placed in service on the line between the Mpumalanga Lowveld and northern KwaZulu-Natal, working from Lydenburg via Swaziland and Golela to the coal export harbour at Richards Bay. In 2013, some Class 39-200s were also observed at the Pyramid South locomotive depot north of Pretoria, along with the five predecessor Class 39-000s.

== Illustration ==
All the Class 39-200 locomotives were delivered in the Transnet Freight Rail livery.

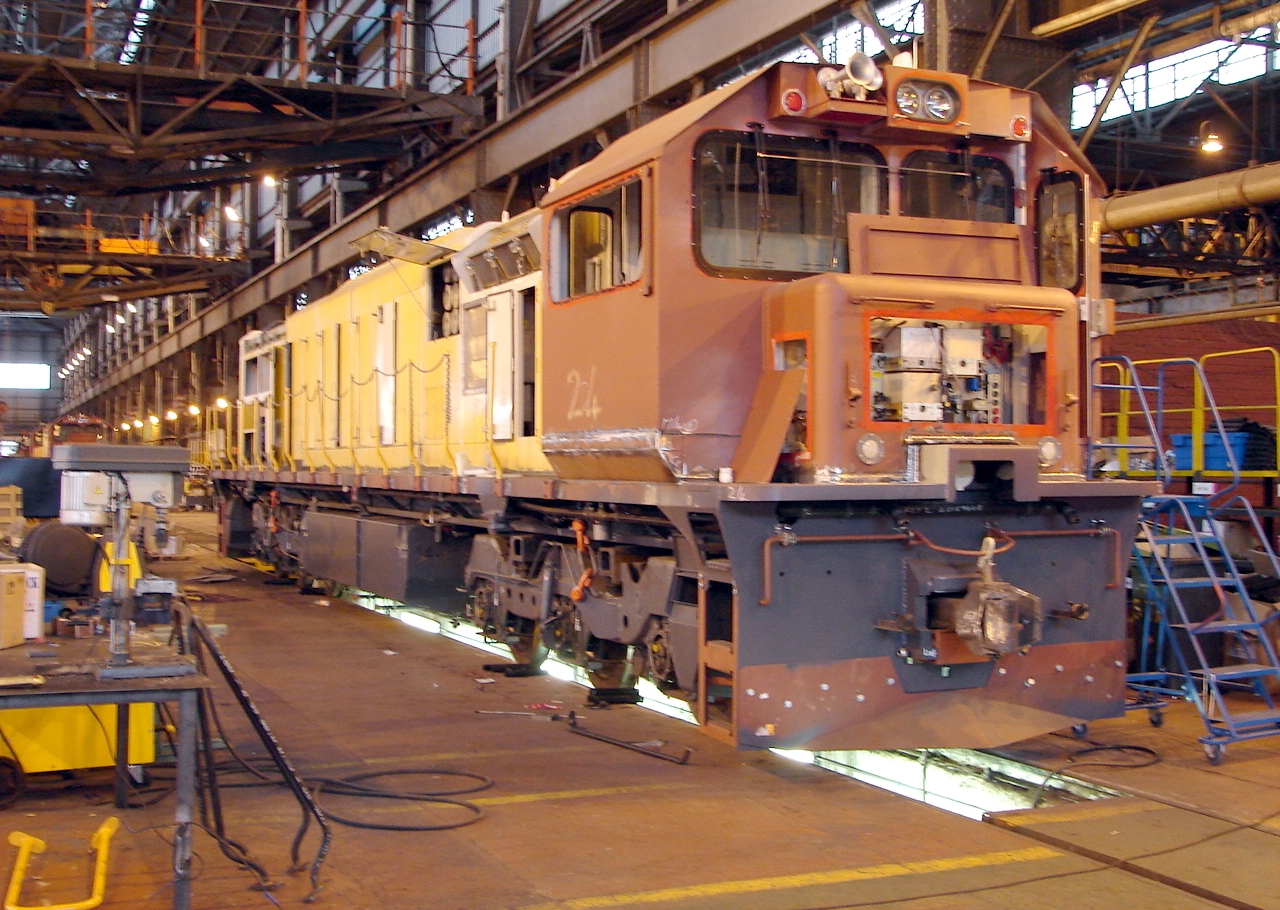
No. 39-224 under construction at Koedoespoort, Pretoria, 2 October 2009

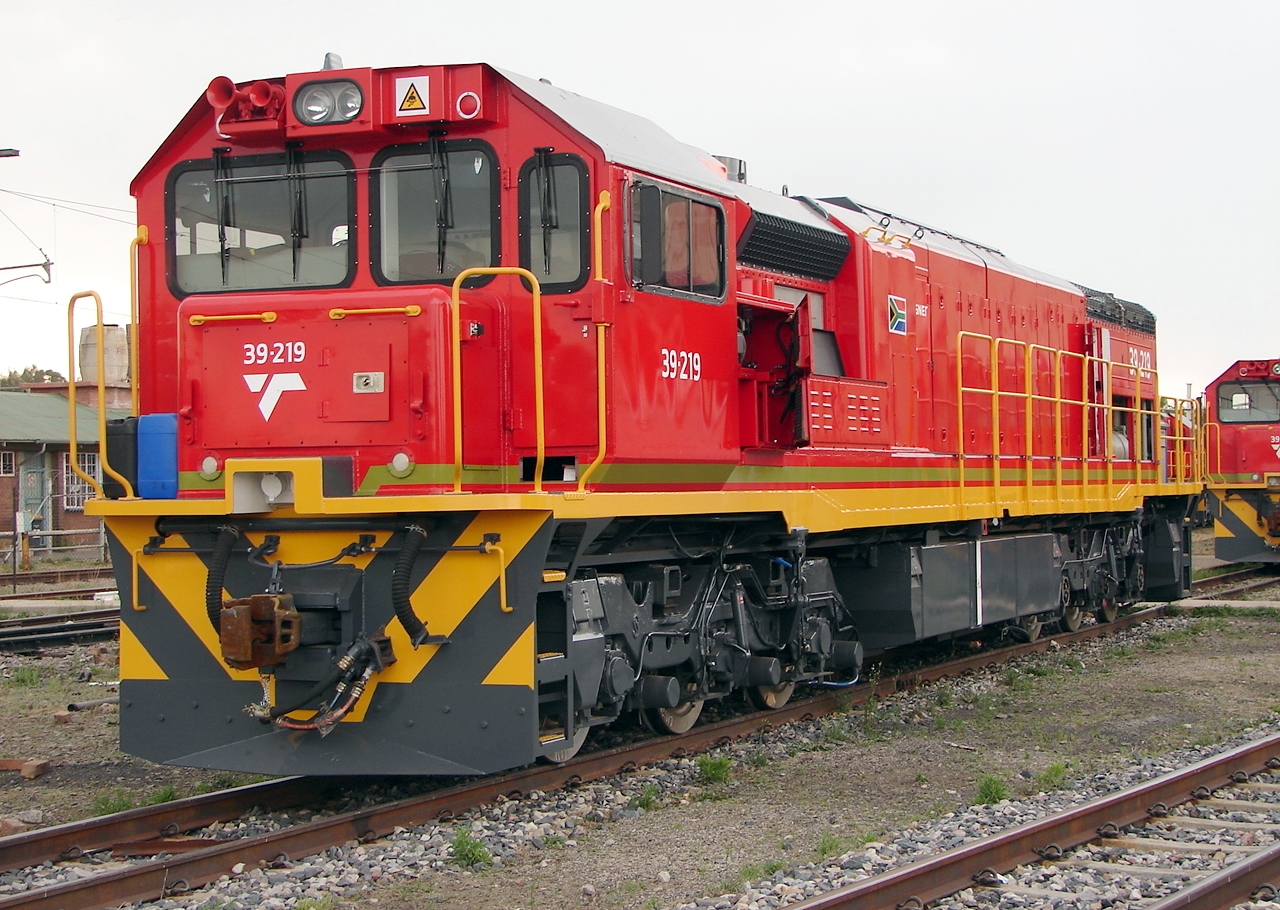
No. 39-219 at Koedoespoort, Pretoria, 2 October 2009

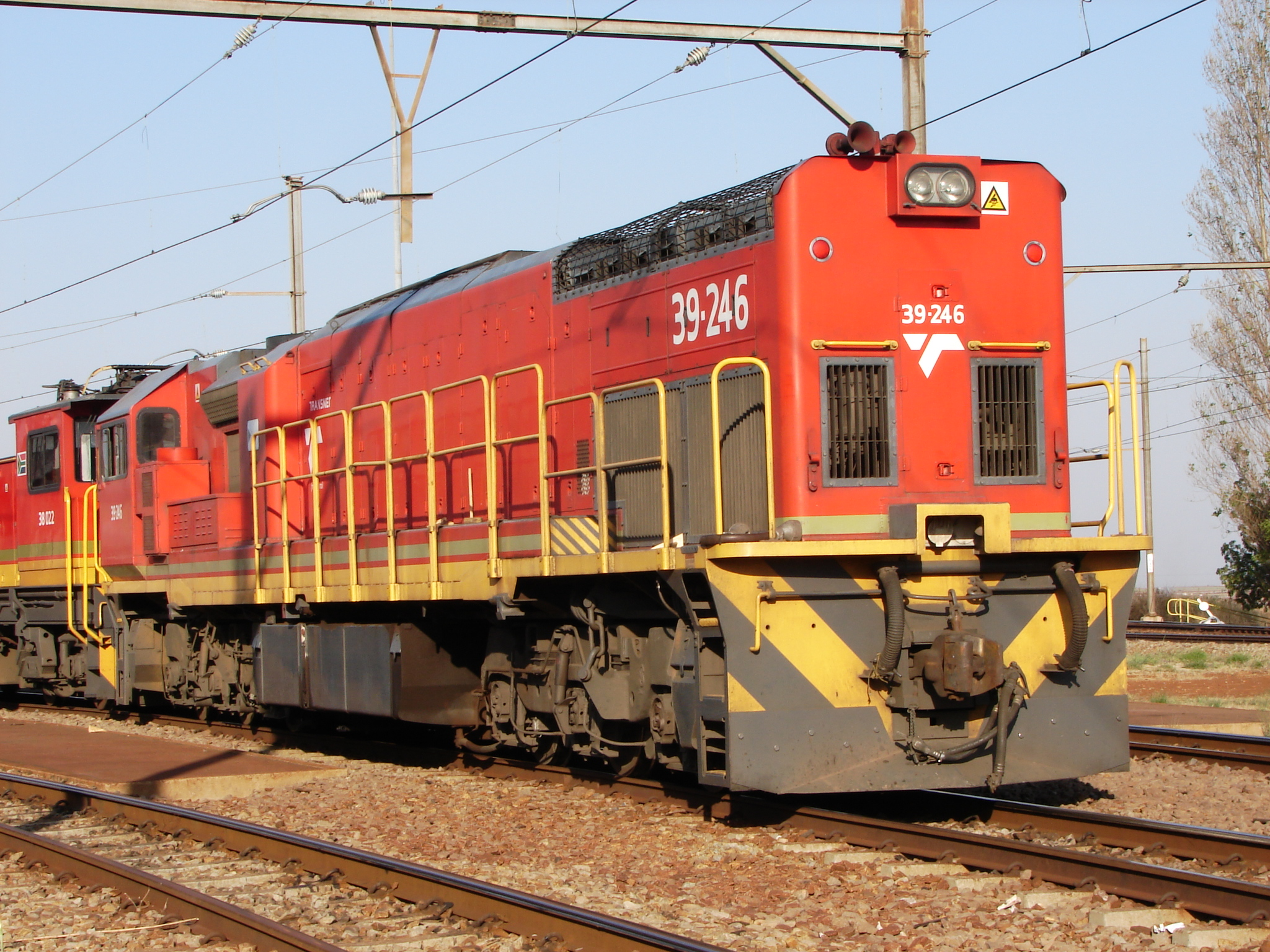
No. 39-246 at Sentrarand, 28 September 2015
