= Al-Dana (vessel) =

The al-Dana was a motorised Arabic dhow or passenger ferry. It was sailing off Manama, Bahrain, when it capsized in the Persian Gulf on March 30, 2006. As of March 31, 67 out of the 150 people on board had been rescued, and 58 have been confirmed dead. Around 40 more are missing. The confirmed dead include 17 Indians and 12 Britons.

Most of the passengers were foreigners from the Nass-Murray & Roberts joint venture construction company who were celebrating completion of part of the Bahrain World Trade Centre towers. Ten of the dead were employed by the South African construction company Murray & Roberts Limited; four of these were South African employees, two were Indian, one was from Pakistan and another was a South African partner. SABC has reported that a sixth South African died in the tragedy.

Bahrain's coastguard service was involved in an immediate rescue operation, reaching minutes after the disaster. The United States Navy's Fifth Fleet helped with the rescue effort with divers and small naval craft.

== Additional information ==
- The Gulf Daily News has reported that the vessel was licensed as a floating restaurant and that it was supposed to remain berthed at the quay.
