= Stacey Fru =

South African writer

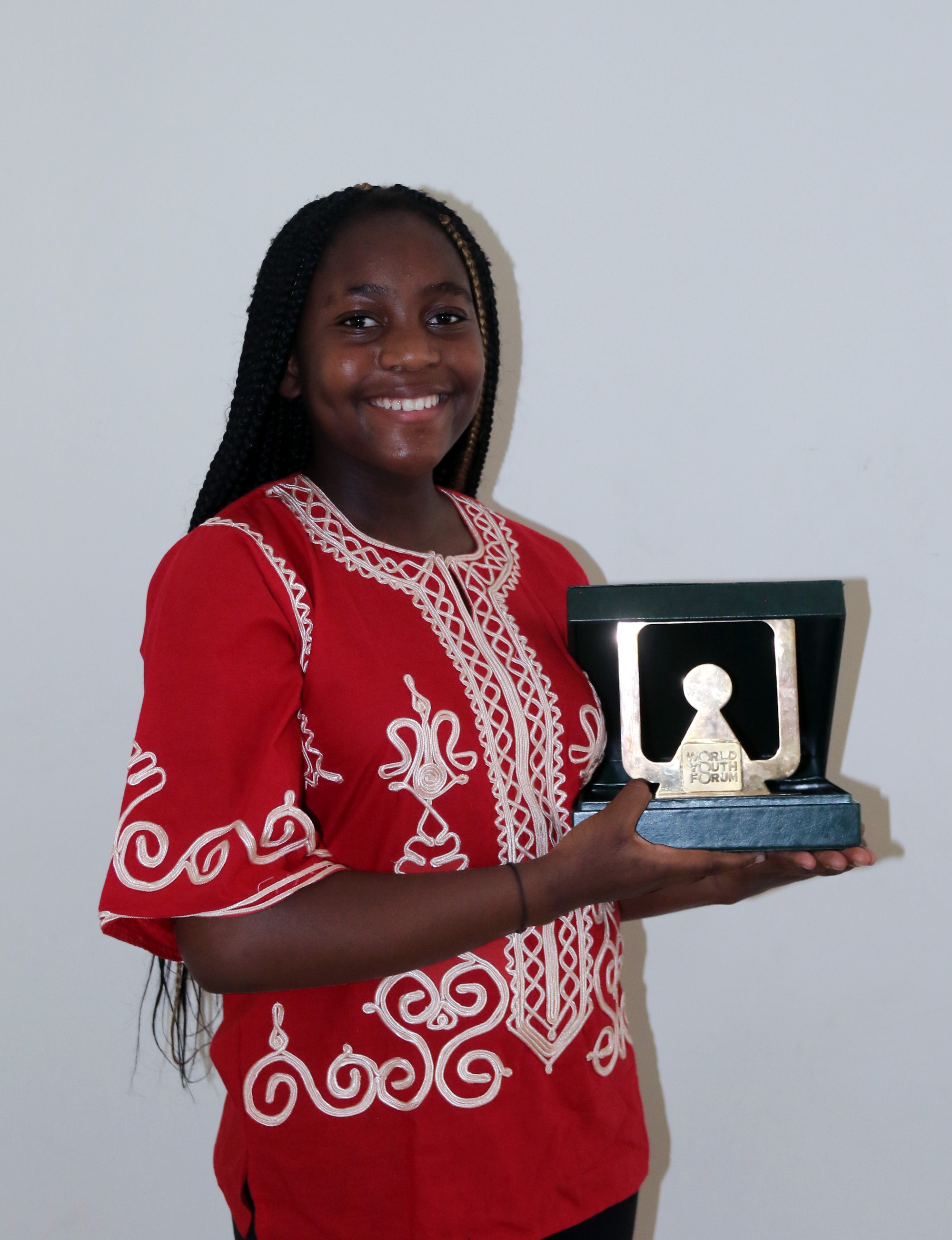
- Fru in 2024
- Born: 16 February 2007 (age 18); Johannesburg, South Africa
- Occupation: Author
- Genre: Children's literature
- Years active: 2015–

Website
- www.staceyfru.co.za

Stacey Fru is a South African writer. Having published her debut novel Smelly Cats in 2015, she is thought to be Africa's youngest published author by the news provider Independent Online. In 2016, she founded the Stacey Fru Foundation, a charity dedicated to improving access to education for children in South Africa's rural areas. Fru was shortlisted for the 2020 International Children's Peace Prize.

== Life ==
Fru is the second of four children in her family. Her first book Smelly Cats was written without her parents' knowledge and published just before her eighth birthday. According to the South African news provider Independent Online, the publication of her debut novel made her Africa's youngest published author. In 2016, she founded the Stacey Fru Foundation, a charity dedicated to improving access to education for children in South Africa's rural areas. In 2017, she became an ambassador for Save the Children. Her 2019 book Tim's Answer was the first book in South Africa to be published simultaneously in print, Braille and via the Digital Accessible Information System.

== Recognition ==
Fru's work has been recognised with several honours: she was the recipient of the 2019 Pan-African Award for Literary Work, the 2020 Outstanding Young African Entrepreneur award, and the 2020 Global Child Prodigy award. She was among those shortlisted for the 2020 International Children's Peace Prize. In March 2021, she was included in a list of the 100 most influential young South Africans published by Avance Media.

== Works ==
- Smelly Cats. Johannesburg: Profounder Publishing. 2015. ISBN 978-0-620-65490-6.
- Bob and the Snake. Johannesburg: Profounder Publishing. 2016. ISBN 978-0-6399205-3-5.
- Tim's Answer. Johannesburg: Profounder Publishing. 2019. ISBN 978-0-6399205-5-9.
- Smelly Cats on Vacation. Johannesburg: Profounder Publishing. 2020. ISBN 978-0-6399205-1-1.
- Where is Tammy?. Johannesburg: Profounder Publishing. 2020. ISBN 978-0-6399205-3-5.
- Stacey Fru As Seen and Heard. Johannesburg: Profounder Publishing. 2021. ISBN 978-0-620-92273-9.
