= Asher Karni =

Israeli businessman (born 1954)

- אשר קרני
- Born: 1954 (age 71–72); Hungary
- Occupation: Businessman
- Known for: Pakistan and Israeli nuclear program

Asher Karni (Hebrew: אשר קרני; born 1954) is a South African and Israeli businessman known for his financial involvement and support for both the Pakistani and Israeli nuclear programs.

== Biography ==
Asher Karni was born in Hungary. He moved to Cape Town, South Africa in the mid-1980s to work for Bnei Akiva, a Jewish Zionist youth movement. He remained in Cape Town and began work as a salesman, selling and buying electronic devices for a local electronics company.

== Controversy ==
In early 2004, Karni was accused by the United States of being part of a conspiracy to sell stolen nuclear material. He was arrested while on holiday with his family in Denver, Colorado. Chief Judge Thomas F. Hogan ordered Karni released on US$100,000 bail to Silver Spring, Maryland, having agreed to waive diplomatic immunity and wear an electronic surveillance device, but the US Government moved to have that ruling overturned.

Karni was accused of selling 200 triggered spark gaps to Humayun Khan, a Pakistani man believed connected to a larger terrorist group in Jammu and Kashmir. The nuclear black market is believed to be very tightly knit and to have been headed by Abdul Qadeer Khan, a major figurehead of the Pakistani nuclear program, who was accused of illicitly transferring nuclear technology to multiple states such as Iran and North Korea.

On August 4, 2005 Karni was sentenced to three years in prison for the sale of restricted equipment to companies in India and Pakistan. His defense team requested eighteen months. U.S. District Judge Richard M. Urbina told Karni that although he now believes Karni's deeds might have been done innocently, the longer sentence was to "send a message", and Karni's cooperation kept it from being longer.

== See also ==
- Nahum Manbar
