= Nosimo Balindlela =

South African politician

Nosimo Zisiwe Beauty Balindlela
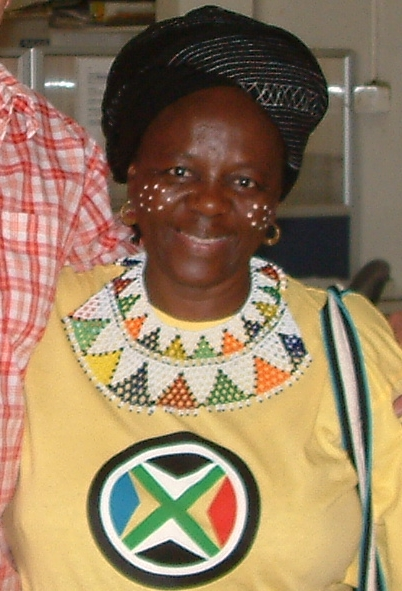
- Balindlela in 2009

Member of Provincial Legislature in the Eastern Cape
- Incumbent
- Assumed office 21 November 2016

Shadow Minister of Water and Sanitation
- In office 2014–2016

3rd Premier of the Eastern Cape
- In office 26 April 2004 – 25 July 2008
- Preceded by: Makhenkesi Stofile
- Succeeded by: Mbulelo Sogoni

Personal details
- Born: 28 November 1949 (age 76) Hermanus, Cape Province
- Party: Democratic Alliance (November 2012-2018)
- Other political affiliations: Congress of the People (November 2008-2012); African National Congress (before November 2008)
- Education: Fort Hare University; Columbia University Teachers College

Nosimo Zisiwe Beauty Balindlela (born 28 November 1949 in Hermanus, Cape Province) is a South African politician who served as the Premier of the Eastern Cape from 26 April 2004 until 1 August 2008. She changed parties in 2008 when she became a member of the Congress of the People, and again in 2012 to join the Democratic Alliance. In 2018 she defected back to the ANC.

== Firing ==
In July 2008, Balindlela resigned from her position as premier after pressure from the National Executive Committee of the African National Congress, of which she was a member. Balindlela also subsequently resigned from "active" politics - however she still remained an active ANC PEC member. Both her "sacking" and that of the neighbouring Western Cape's ANC premier Ebrahim Rasool were announced on the same day.

Her successor, Mbulelo Sogoni, was sworn in on 1 August 2008. She resigned from the ANC on 4 November 2008 to join the Congress of the People.

In November 2012 she joined the Democratic Alliance, her second change of political party. She became a member of parliament for the DA in May 2014, and served as Shadow Minister of Water and Sanitation until November 2016, when she transferred to the Eastern Cape Legislature.

Political offices
Preceded by Makhenkesi Stofile	Premier of the Eastern Cape; 26 April 2004 – 1 August 2008	Succeeded by Mbulelo Sogoni
