= Thabang Makwetla =

South African politician

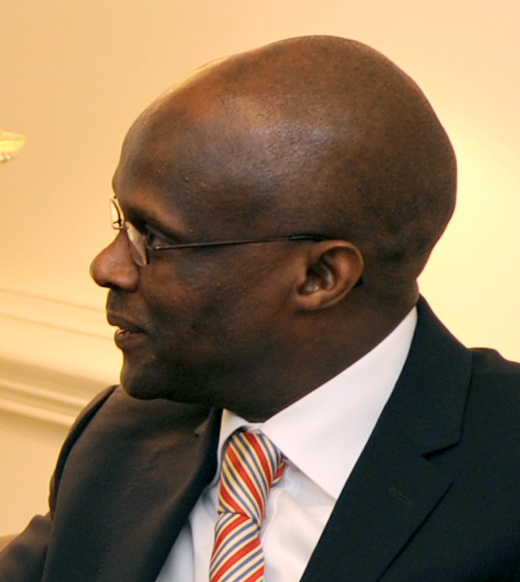
- Makwetla in October 2009

Deputy Minister of Defence and Military Veterans
- In office 29 May 2019 – 19 June 2024
- President: Cyril Ramaphosa
- Minister: Nosiviwe Mapisa-Nqakula; Thandi Modise
- Preceded by: Kebby Maphatsoe
- Succeeded by: Richard Mkhungo; Bantu Holomisa

Deputy Minister of Justice and Correctional Services
- In office 25 May 2014 – 29 May 2019 Serving with John Jeffery
- Preceded by: John Jeffery
- Succeeded by: Patekile Holomisa

Deputy Minister of Defence and Military Veterans
- In office 11 May 2009 – 25 May 2014
- Preceded by: Fezile Bhengu
- Succeeded by: Kebby Maphatsoe

3rd Premier of Mpumalanga
- In office 21 April 2004 – 10 May 2009
- Preceded by: Ndaweni Mahlangu
- Succeeded by: David Mabuza

Personal details
- Born: Thabang Samson Phathakge Makwetla; 18 May 1957 (age 69) Lydenburg, Mpumalanga, South Africa
- Party: African National Congress
- Education: Bulgarian Academy of Sciences and the University of the Witwatersrand
- Occupation: Activist; politician

Thabang Sampson Makwetla (/məˈkwɛtlə/, born 18 May 1957) is a South African politician who was the third Premier of Mpumalanga between 2004 and 2009. A member of the African National Congress (ANC), he went on to serve as a deputy minister in the South African government from 2009 to 2024; he was the Deputy Minister of Defence and Military Veterans from 2019 to 2024 and earlier from 2009 to 2014, and in the interim he was Deputy Minister of Justice and Correctional Services from 2014 to 2019.

== Early life and exile ==
Thabang Sampson Phathakge Makwetla was born on 18 May 1957 in Lydenburg, a mining town in the Eastern Transvaal province, now known as Mpumalanga, South Africa. Since he participated in the Soweto Student Uprising in June 1976, he was forced to flee the country before he could matriculate. He fled to Lesotho to complete his schooling and joined the ANC's military wing Umkhonto we Sizwe (MK), later serving as an instructor and political commissar in the organization. While serving in the MK, Makwetla was stationed in neighboring countries, such as Angola, Botswana, and Zambia.

Matwetla received education in Europe, earning a diploma from the Academy of Sciences in Bulgaria, and also undertook a short military training course from the Soviet Union in 1979. Makwetla returned to Africa and worked as treasurer for the South African Communist Party in the Botswanan region from 1981 to 1990.

It was near the end of apartheid when Makwetla returned to South Africa, joining the National Executive Committee of the ANC's youth wing, the African National Congress Youth League.

== Political career ==
Makwetla is a member of the African National Congress, a centre-left democratic-socialist party, and is working under the cabinet of South African President Matamela Cyril Ramaphosa, who took office after Jacob Zuma's resignation on 14 February 2018.

He was Deputy Minister of Defence and Military Veterans from 2019 to 2024, a role he previously served in between 2009 and 2014. He has also served as the Deputy Minister of Justice and Correctional Services.

Makwetla, during his time as an ANC chairman, was asked about how to cease the spreading of HIV and AIDS throughout South Africa. "As the ANC, we need to lead in this regard to change attitudes associated with being infected with the AIDS virus," and, "We should start seeing AIDS for what it is, a biological disaster visited upon humanity, and stop blaming individuals."

Makwetla delivered a noted progress report to ANC Representatives on 9 March 2012 in Johannesburg, during his term as Minister of Defence and Military Veterans. He stated in the report that soldiers could, "receive counselling as their [sic] lives had been disrupted at the time of the struggle for the democracy," as well as educate veterans, wanting to, "provide entrepreneurial training for those interested in taking up business careers."

During his term as Minister of Justice and Correctional Services, Makwetla visited St. Alban's Prison in Port Elizabeth, South Africa, where a clash between inmates and officers resulted in three deaths. During the 27 December 2016 visit, he stated, “In order to strengthen our enforcement capabilities, we have decided to place St. Albans on a lockdown and suspend all family visits to the centre. This is a necessary precautionary step in order to bring back normalcy to the centre” and, “the Ministry wish to commend officials who managed to quell down this rebellious act that could have led to a calamitous situation on our hands. In the same vein, our condolences and sympathy goes to the families and relatives of the deceased inmates[.]"

It was reported a fight had broken out between factions of the MKMVA in late 2017, "One group, made up of some MKMVA members and the MK National Council led by Deputy Minister of Justice and Correctional Services Thabang Makwetla and former MK chief of staff Siphiwe Nyanda, has threatened to go to court if the ANC fails to nullify the results of an MKMVA elective conference in June at which Kebby Maphatsoe was re-elected president."

Makwetla has denounced the rampant corruption and immorality of South African governments while in office. In a media briefing, he stated that, “there is a need for lifestyle audits and vetting of ANC leadership at all levels of the organisation, stamping out corruption and state capture", and separately, "You cannot have any group of people who purport to have the capacity to protect lives in South Africa who are not mandated to do so. We have police, military establishment to deal with unlawful acts."

== Controversies ==
In the late 2000s, Makwetla was reported to have pledged his support for former South African President, Thabo Mbeki, who announced his resignation amidst corruption charges on 20 September 2008. As a consequence of this support, Makwetla lost his position of provincial chairperson of Mpumalanga to his deputy David Mabuza who supported Jacob Zuma's successful bid to be ANC President at the 2007 Polokwane national congress, but later Makwetla was able to assume the role of deputy of the Minister of Defence and Military Veterans.

During a conference with former MK soldiers in Johannesburg, he accused MK Military Veterans’ Association (MKMVA) chairperson Kebby Maphatsoe of seeking to "derail his vision" by interfering in the politics of the ANC. He began to lash out during the meeting, specifically at the MKMVA for performing “an intention on the part of [their] leadership to convene a unilateral conference aimed deliberately at sidelining the overwhelming majority of former members of MK.", which intensified a divide between the two groups.

In late March 2016, articles were released by the Dutch news outlet The Edge Search, as well as the South African paper Independent Online (IOL), which both claimed that Makwetla had been "fobbing off the government" to pay for his alcohol addiction. The articles received little attention, and in the long run have not significantly affected Makwetla's position.

In April 2019, Parliament's Joint Committee on Ethics and Members Interests sanctioned Makwetla for having accepted a gratuity from Bosasa, a company which frequently did business with the Department of Correctional Services. Makwetla had failed to disclose that Bosasa installed a security system gratis at his home in January 2016; when questioned by the committee, he said that there was no conflict of interest because he had intended to pay Bosasa for the service, though Bosasa head Gavin Watson had ultimately refused to accept payment from him. When Makwetla testified about the incident at the Zondo Commission in July 2021, he continued to deny any wrongdoing. However, the final report of the Zondo Commission recommended that he should face criminal investigation, finding that he may have breached the Prevention and Combating of Corrupt Activities Act; in the report, Justice Raymond Zondo commented that, "If Mr Makwetla's evidence that he saw no conflict of interest in this situation is true, then, quite frankly, that is scary." Makwetla disagreed with Zondo's assessment.

== Kidnapping ==
On the evening of 21 May 2017, Makwetla was hijacked outside the Life Riverfield Hospital in Nietgedacht, where he was visiting Mongane Wally Serote. He was alone in his Range Rover when four masked men entered the vehicle and, holding him at gunpoint, drove him to a nearby informal settlement. He was robbed of his vehicle, credit cards, and cellphone, and forced to withdraw a large amount of cash from his accounts, before the robbers dropped him off at Kgabalatsane, a stretch of veld near Brits and Garankuwa. The incident lasted for approximately three hours, though Makwetla spent the next four hours knocking on doors before he was able to contact the police for help.

Physically unharmed, Makwetla returned to work on 23 May. He described the ordeal as a "harrowing experience". Shortly after a case was opened with the local Garankuwa police station, four suspects were found and arrested. All four were charged with kidnapping and robbery with aggravation at Garankuwa Magistrate’s Court. Makwetla, who attended the court proceedings with an entourage of Umkhonto we Sizwe veterans, told the press that he wished to speak to and rehabilitate the hijackers; he said that he "had tried to reason with the group and explain that he recognised the hardship under which they lived," and that "he would want them to recognise [they're] proud South Africans." Responding to the news that one of the alleged hijackers had previously been released on bail for a prior hijacking, the Minister of Police, Fikile Mbalula, called for reforms to bail and prosecution for repeat offenders.
