= Edna Molewa =

South African politician (1957–2018)

The Honourable Edna Molewa D.A.S(hc) Officier de la légion d’honneur
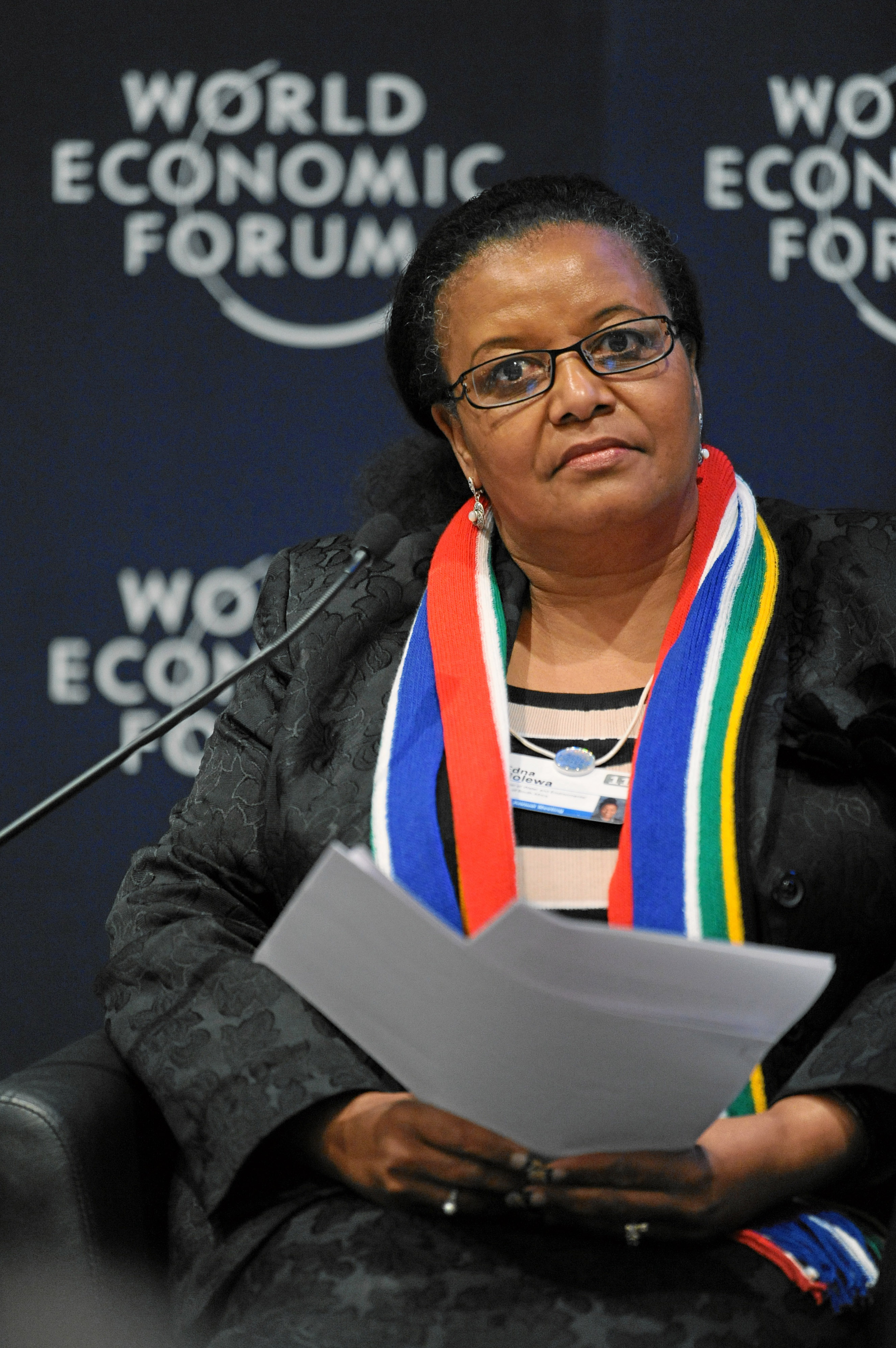

Minister of Environmental Affairs
- In office 26 May 2014 – 22 September 2018
- President: Jacob Zuma; Cyril Ramaphosa
- Preceded by: Position established
- Succeeded by: Nomvula Mokonyane

Minister of Water and Environmental Affairs
- In office 31 October 2010 – 25 May 2014
- President: Jacob Zuma
- Preceded by: Buyelwa Sonjica
- Succeeded by: Nomvula Mokonyane as Minister of Water and Sanitation.

Minister of Social Development
- In office 11 May 2009 – 31 October 2010
- President: Jacob Zuma
- Preceded by: Zola Skweyiya
- Succeeded by: Bathabile Dlamini

2nd Premier of North West Province
- In office 30 April 2004 – 6 May 2009
- Preceded by: Popo Molefe
- Succeeded by: Maureen Modiselle

Personal details
- Born: 23 March 1957 Warmbaths, Transvaal, South Africa
- Died: 22 September 2018 (aged 61) Pretoria, South Africa
- Party: African National Congress
- Spouse: Richard Molewa (sep. 2017)
- Children: 4
- Awards: Order of Mapungubwe in gold (2019, posthumously)

Bomo Edith Edna Molewa (23 March 1957 – 22 September 2018), formerly known as Edna Sethema, was a South African politician and member of the African National Congress. Molewa became the Minister of Water and Environmental Affairs of South Africa on 31 October 2010, as part of a cabinet reshuffle by President Jacob Zuma. On 25 May 2014 her Ministry has been divided and she was appointed Minister of Environmental Affairs. She succeeded Buyelwa Sonjica. Prior to her death, Molewa was studying towards a Bachelor's of Arts Honours in Developmental Studies through the University of South Africa.

== Political career ==
Molewa was involved in South Africa's liberation movement from 1976 through 1990. During that time she was a member of various activist and regional economic development organizations. Beginning in 1984 she served as a chairperson of the South African Commercial, Catering and Allied Workers Union and eventually became its deputy president. In 1994 Molewa became the first female Chairperson of the Portfolio Committee on Trade and Industry, and in 1996 went on to serve as a member of the Executive Council on Tourism, Environment and Conservation.

She was also a member of the Executive Council on Economic Development and Tourism from 1998 through 2000. Between 2000 and 2004 Molewa was a member of the Executive Council on Agriculture, Conservation and Environment Affairs. On 30 April 2004, she became the first woman Premier of the North West Provincial Government, a post she held until 2009, and is credited with having put the province on a successful track. For a short time Molewa was appointed Minister of Social Development, but in 2010 became the Minister of Water and Environmental Affairs after a cabinet reshuffle, replacing Buyelwa Sonjica. In May 2014, the department was split and Molewa became minister of the new Department of Environmental Affairs, a position she held until her death in September 2018.

Molewa was also the Head of Communications of the African National Congress Women's League between 2013 and 2015, and a member of the organization's National Executive Council since 2003.

== Environmental issues ==
From the time Molewa assumed her role as Minister of Environmental Affairs she worked to advance the integrated strategic management of rhinoceroses through a variety of conservation-minded efforts approved by the president's cabinet. Among the efforts she spearheaded were translocation programs, anti-poaching initiatives, sale of rhinoceroses to private properties, law enforcement collaboration at all levels, and efforts to conform to CITES regulations on detecting trafficked flora and fauna. Molewa's administration supported research into the efficacy of legalizing an international rhinoceros horn trade and began programs for translocation of rhino from high-risk areas to low-risk areas both nationally and internationally, and the sale of more than 200 white rhino to private buyers. However planned sales of rhinoceros from Kruger National Park to private game reserves in late 2014 were canceled after it was discovered that some of the prospective buyers were owners of hunting reserves. One of the alleged buyers had been accused of having business dealings with Dawie Groenewald who was arrested in the United States for money laundering and selling fraudulent game hunts and was arrested in 2010 in South Africa in relation to illegally killing rhinoceros.

Molewa also announced that a 22-member commission would decide whether to propose the international sale of the South African government's 21 metric ton rhino horn stockpile. Considerations include whether to sell the stockpile as a whole via a government-to-government sale or to petition for an open, regulated sale direct to consumers, a move that has been widely criticized as counterproductive by ecologists. Conservationists claimed that the idea of a rhino trade is fundamentally flawed and would potentially increase demand. There is also concern that funds received from the sale of government-held rhino horn stockpiles would be abused or bypass normal government oversight of its expenditures as is claimed happened to funds from South Africa's one-off sale of elephant ivory stockpiles.

Under Molewa's leadership Environmental Affairs also received criticisms for not releasing quarterly reports in 2015 on rhino poaching or arrests of suspected rhino poachers. Despite the Minister having repeatedly stated that the Department of Environmental Affairs remained committed to providing regular updates on the state of rhino poaching in South Africa, she failed to keep to this schedule and released bi-annual reports only, having labeled them quarterly reports. In an interview Molewa stated that details on successful arrests and convictions would have to be obtained from the individual agencies. Earlier reports had indicated the number of rhino poached each year increasing despite the efforts of law enforcement agencies and Environmental Affairs.

In 2015 South African environmental groups criticized Molewa's decision to grant temporary emissions compliance exemptions to South Africa's largest electricity producer Eskom as well as Sasol, Anglo American Platinum and dozens of others companies. The multi-year exemptions allowed Eskom, Sasol, Royal Dutch Shell, among others to postpone implementation of emissions-reducing equipment which would allow them to meet the minimal national standards for air quality defined in South Africa's National Environmental Management Air Quality Act. Sulphur dioxide, nitrogen oxides, and particulate matter emissions reduction standards were set to be in place by April 2015. Environmental Affairs Minister Molewa explained in February 2015 that retrofit postponements would "provide an opportunity for industry to take the necessary action and retrofit their plants to enable them to comply with the standards in the near future, while ensuring that socio-economic growth is not hampered."

=== Lion bone export quota ===
In January 2017 Molewa opened a public consultation for the approval of a yearly export quota of 800 lion skeletons from the captive bred lion industry (CLB) to be used in Asia as fake tiger bone wine, in particular supplied to Lao PDR, Vietnam and Thailand. The proposal and subsequent approval, signed off in June 2017 while it was supposedly still under scientific scrutiny, has evoked major criticism by, and concern among, local and international conservationists, scientists, animal welfare organizations and the public, for the impact this will have on the conservation of lions and big cats worldwide and for the ethical implications this has for the industry, which is considered highly unregulated and cruel. The shift in the market towards countries listed by global conservation and law enforcement agencies as having weak regulation and high corruption levels has been flagged as a major concern since it provides many opportunities for intensive illegal trade in wild animals.

International public criticism of the South African trade in lion bones is believed to be extremely damaging to "Brand South Africa" and the country's popularity and attractiveness as a tourism destination. The projected negative cost impact of the country's lion bone trade is estimated to be around R54.50-billion over the next decade. Despite the controversy, in July 2018, Molewa nearly doubled the lion bone export quota, to 1500 skeletons a year. Quotas have been declared since 2017 in accordance with the advice provided by the Scientific Authority (SA) on principles of demand and supply and with the results of the South African National Biodiversity Institute's (SANBI) three-year research project, started in 2017 and still underway. Consequently, after the 2018 quota was announced, some researchers involved in this project have distanced themselves from the decision-making process.

Additionally, violations on the quota have been reported since 2017, with bones of captive tigers and other endangered big cats (listed in Appendix I of the CITES) being reportedly laundered in the export process. A growing global awareness around the consequences of being linked to this contentious industry and the criticism it draws, led the largest lion bone carrier, Singapore Airlines, to decide to stop transporting big cat body parts from South Africa, beginning in August 2018.

== Controversies ==
In February 2013, while Minister of Water Affairs, Molewa awarded a R419 million IT contract to Business Connexion instead of using the State Information Technology Agency. The department's director general refused to sign off on the contract and was suspended by Minister Molewa. As a result, the suspended director general continued to receive a paycheck for roughly two years while fighting charges that were eventually dropped by the new Minister of Water and Sanitation.

Large-scale load-shedding events and nationwide blackouts have sparked controversy in 2014 and 2015 after government ministers gave conflicting reasons for the blackouts. While Public Enterprise Minister Malusi Gigaba gave vague reasons which included low water levels at dams, Minister Molewa claimed that wet coal at mines in Mpumalanga were to blame. There has also been public concern over the government's failure to address investment in energy production which has caused energy companies to struggle to meet demand. Scheduled maintenance on power stations have exacerbated problems with a vulnerable and constrained power grid.

== Education ==
Edna Molewa attended the University of South Africa where she gained her Bachelor of Commerce. Afterwards, Molewa followed a Leadership course at the Harvard Kennedy School of Government and obtained a Certificate of Economic Leadership Development Programme from the Wharton Business School.

== Death ==
Having returned on 8 September from a state visit to China, where she had contracted a virus, Molewa was hospitalised a few days later. She was placed in an induced coma after failing to respond to medical treatment. After coming out of the coma, Molewa briefly stabilised, but died on 22 September 2018 in Pretoria. She was 61 years old.
