= Deputy President of South Africa =

Second highest ranking executive officer of South Africa

Deputy President of the Republic of South Africa
- 10 other official names: Adjunkpresident van Suid-Afrika (Afrikaans); iSekela likaMengameli weSewula Afrika (Southern Ndebele); uSekela-Mongameli waseMzantsi Afrika (Xhosa); iPhini likaMengameli waseNingizimu Afrika (Zulu); liSekela laMengameli weleNingizimu Afrika (Swazi); Motlatšamoporesitente wa Afrika Borwa (Northern Sotho); Motlatsi wa Mopresidente wa Afrika Borwa (Sotho); Motlatsamoporesitente wa Aforika Borwa (Tswana); Xandla Xa Puresidente wa Afrika-Dzonga (Tsonga); Muthusa Phresidennde wa Afrika Tshipembe (Venda)
- Coat of Arms

- Flag of South Africa

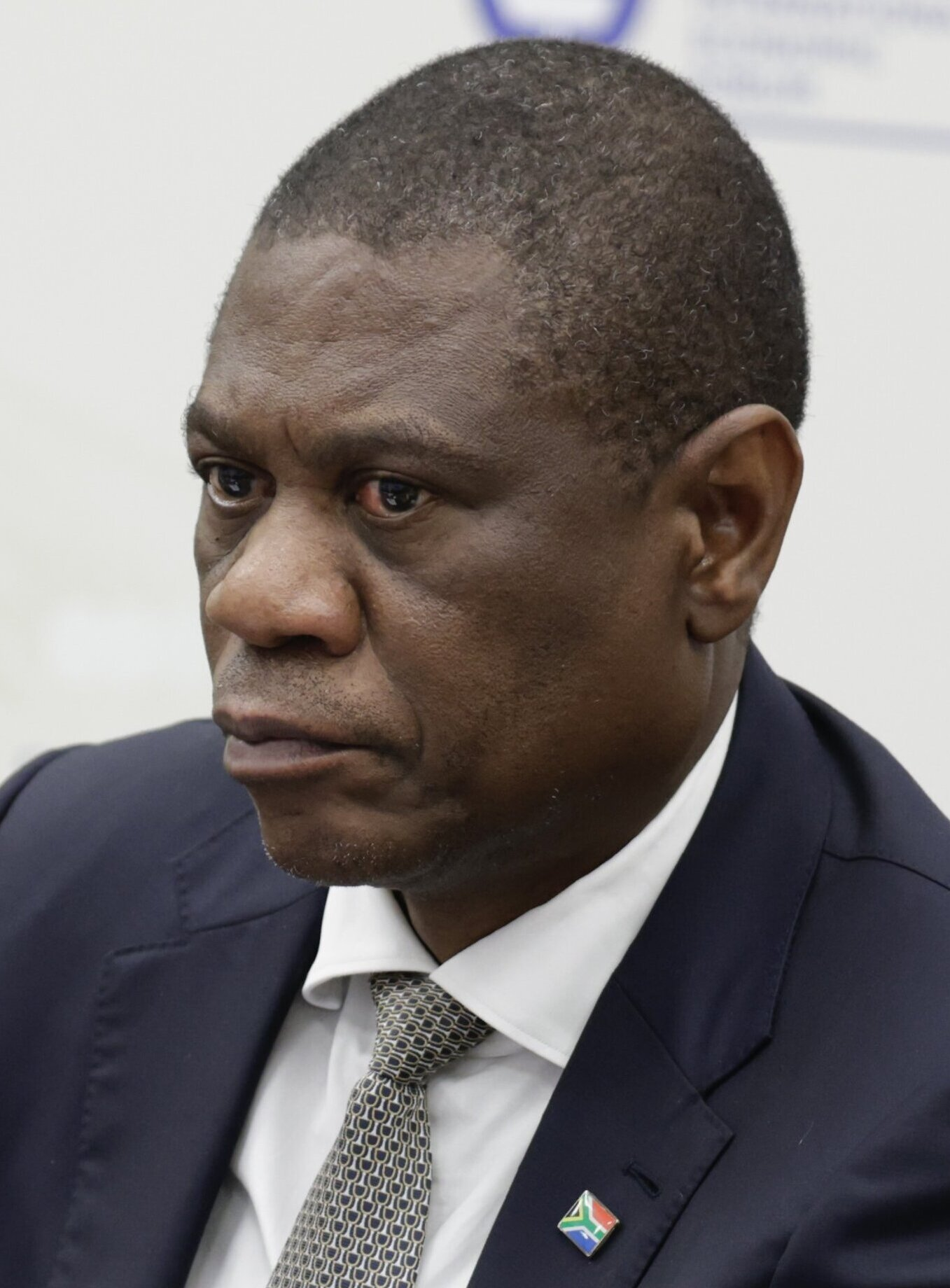
- Incumbent; Paul Mashatile since 7 March 2023
- Style: Mr. Deputy President (informal); His Excellency (formal, diplomatic)
- Type: Deputy to the Head of State and Head of Government
- Abbreviation: DP
- Member of: Cabinet; National Assembly
- Reports to: The President
- Residence: Oliver Tambo House (Pretoria); Highstead (Cape Town); Dr. John L. Dube House (Durban)
- Appointer: President
- Term length: No term limit
- Inaugural holder: F. W. De Klerk
- Formation: 10 May 1994; 32 years ago
- Salary: R3,28 million per annum
- Website: www.thepresidency.gov.za

The deputy president of South Africa is the second highest ranking officer of the executive branch of the Government of South Africa. The deputy president is a member of the National Assembly and the Cabinet.

The deputy president is constitutionally required to "assist the president in the execution of the functions of government", and may be assigned any government portfolio by presidential proclamation. The deputy president performs the duties of the president when the president is outside the country's borders, unable to fulfill the duties of the office, or when the presidency is vacant. The deputy president is generally appointed as the leader of government business in the Parliament of South Africa by the president.

Under the interim constitution (valid from 1994 to 1996), there was a Government of National Unity, in which a member of parliament from the largest opposition party was entitled to a position as deputy president. Along with Mbeki, the previous state president, F. W. de Klerk, also served as deputy president in his capacity as the leader of the National Party, then the second-largest party in the new parliament. De Klerk later resigned and went into opposition with his party. A voluntary coalition government continues to exist under the new constitution (adopted in 1996), although there have been no appointments of opposition politicians to the post of deputy president.

The official living residences of the deputy president are Oliver Tambo House in Pretoria, Highstead, in Cape Town and Dr John L Dube House in Durban.

== Inception and expiry of term ==
The deputy president's term of office is not fixed by law. The deputy president's term begins upon appointment by the president. The deputy president must be selected from the members of the National Assembly and takes a prescribed oath.

The deputy president's term is ended by one of four constitutional mechanisms: dismissal by the president, a successful 'motion of no confidence in the president' by the National Assembly, a successful 'motion of no confidence excluding the president' by the National Assembly, or a newly elected president's assumption of office. A statement of resignation can also end a deputy president's term of office.

=== Informal roles ===
Depending on the extent of any informal roles and functions of the deputy president depend on the specific relationship between the president and deputy president, but often the roles include tasks like:

- Spokesperson for the administration policies
- Adviser to the president

== Deputy presidents of South Africa (1994–present) ==
Parties

National Party
African National Congress

No.	Portrait	Name (Birth–Death)	Term of office			President	Political party
No.	Portrait	Name (Birth–Death)	Took office	Left office	Time in office	President	Political party
1		F. W. de Klerk (1936–2021)	10 May 1994	30 June 1996 (resigned)	2 years, 51 days	Nelson Mandela	National Party
2		Thabo Mbeki (born 1942)	10 May 1994	14 June 1999 (became president)	5 years, 35 days	Nelson Mandela	African National Congress
3		Jacob Zuma (born 1942)	14 June 1999	14 June 2005 (dismissed but became president on 9 May 2009)	6 years	Thabo Mbeki	African National Congress
4		Phumzile Mlambo-Ngcuka (1955-2026)	14 June 2005	23 September 2008 (resigned)	3 years, 101 days	Thabo Mbeki	African National Congress
5		Baleka Mbete (born 1949)	25 September 2008	9 May 2009 (term ended)	226 days	Kgalema Motlanthe	African National Congress
6		Kgalema Motlanthe (born 1949)	9 May 2009	26 May 2014 (term ended)	5 years, 17 days	Jacob Zuma	African National Congress
7		Cyril Ramaphosa (born 1952)	26 May 2014	15 February 2018 (became president)	3 years, 265 days	Jacob Zuma	African National Congress
8		David Mabuza (1960–2025)	27 February 2018	28 February 2023 (resigned)	5 years, 1 day	Cyril Ramaphosa	African National Congress
9		Paul Mashatile (born 1961)	7 March 2023	Incumbent	3 years, 259 days	Cyril Ramaphosa	African National Congress

== See also ==
- List of current vice presidents
- Vice State President of South Africa
- President of South Africa
