= South African Class 34-600 =

South african locomotive

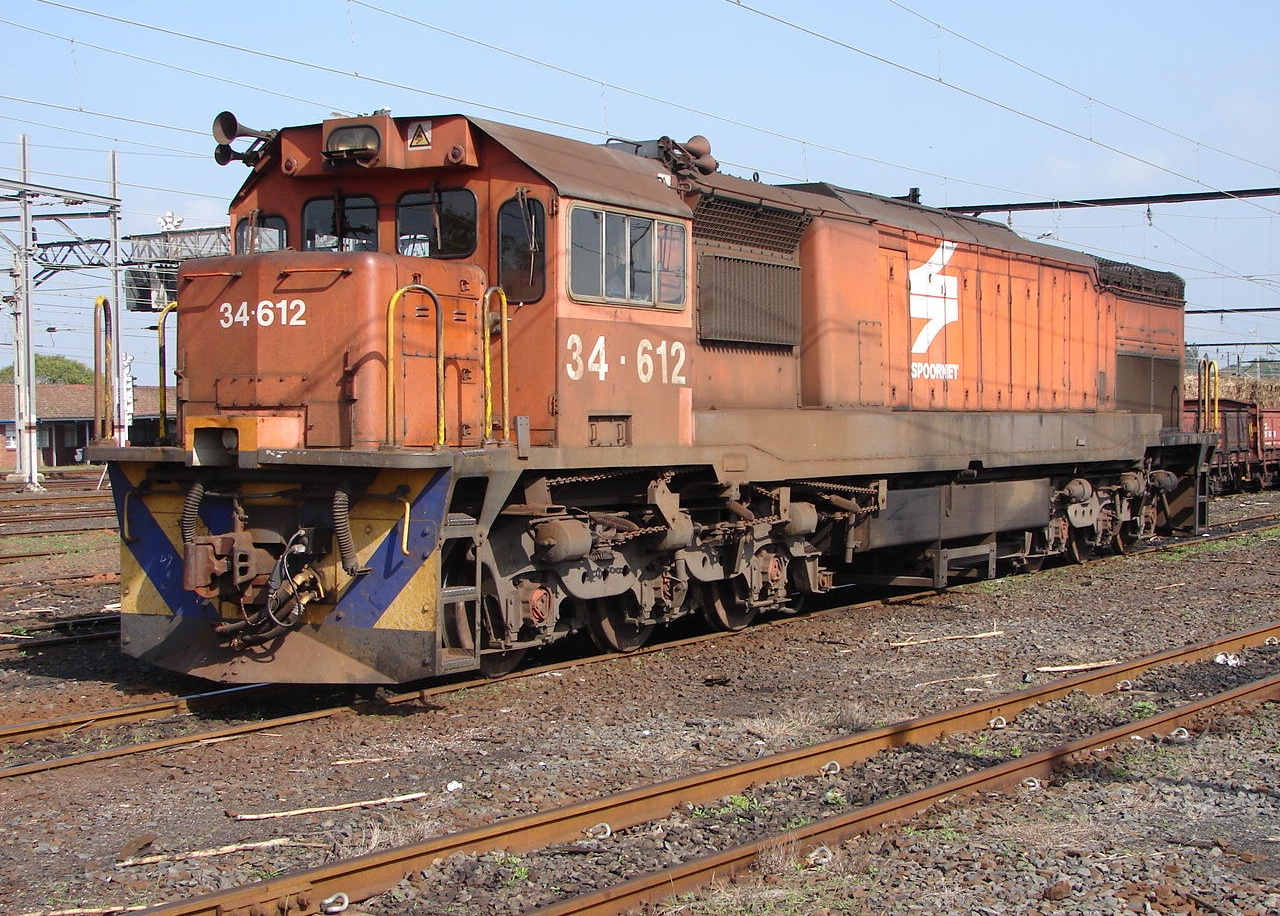
- No. 34-612 on yard duty at Empangeni, Kwa-Zulu Natal, 14 August 2007
Type and origin
- ♠ – Original locomotive, as built ♥ – Locomotive with upgraded traction motors
- Power type: Diesel-electric
- Designer: General Motors Electro-Motive Division
- Builder: General Motors South Africa
- Serial number: 101-1 to 101-100
- Model: GM-EMD GT26MC
- Build date: 1974–1976
- Total produced: 100
- Rebuilder: Transnet Rail Engineering
- Rebuild date: 2006–2008
- Number rebuilt: 3 to Class 39-000
Specifications
- Configuration
  - AAR: C-C
  - UIC: Co'Co'
  - Commonwealth: Co+Co
- Gauge: 3 ft 6 in (1,067 mm) Cape gauge
- Wheel diameter: 1,016 mm (40.0 in)
- Wheelbase: 14,732 mm (48 ft 4.0 in)
  - Bogie: 3,632 mm (11 ft 11.0 in)
- Pivot centres: 11,278 mm (37 ft 0 in)
- Length
  - Over couplers: 19,202 mm (63 ft 0 in)
- Width: 2,819 mm (9 ft 3.0 in)
- Height: 3,924 mm (12 ft 10.5 in)
- Axle load: 18,850 kg (41,560 lb)
- Adhesive weight: 113,100 kg (249,300 lb)
- Loco weight: 113,100 kg (249,300 lb) max
- Fuel type: Diesel
- Fuel capacity: 6,100 litres (1,300 imp gal)
- Prime mover: GM-EMD 16-645E3
- RPM range: 250–900
  - RPM low idle: 250
  - RPM idle: 315
  - Maximum RPM: 900
- Engine type: 2-stroke diesel
- Aspiration: GM-EMD E16 turbocharger
- Displacement: 10.57 litres (645.0 cu in)
- Alternator: 10 pole 3 phase GM-EMD AR10F-D14
- Traction motors: ♠ Six GM-EMD D29B DC 4 pole ♥ Six GM-EMD D31 DC 4 pole
  - Rating 1 hour: ♠ 485A ♥ 545A
  - Continuous: ♠ 450A @ 21 km/h (13 mph) ♥ 520A @ 21 km/h (13 mph)
- Cylinders: V16
- Gear ratio: 63:14
- MU working: 6 maximum
- Loco brake: 28-LAV-1 with vigilance control
- Train brakes: Gardner-Denver ADJV-8401 compressor/exhauster
- Air tank cap.: 850 litres (190 imp gal)
- Compressor: 0.021 m^{3}/s (0.74 cu ft/s)
- Exhauster: 0.098 m^{3}/s (3.5 cu ft/s)
- Couplers: AAR knuckle (SASKOP E)
Performance figures
- Maximum speed: 100 km/h (62 mph)
- Power output
  - Starting: ♠ 2,145 kW (2,876 hp) ♥ 2,342 kW (3,141 hp)
  - Continuous: ♠ 1,940 kW (2,600 hp) ♥ 2,171 kW (2,911 hp)
- Tractive effort
  - Starting: ♠ 272 kN (61,000 lbf) ♥ 306 kN (69,000 lbf)
  - Continuous: ♠ 218 kN (49,000 lbf) @ 26 km/h (16 mph) ♥ 245 kN (55,000 lbf) @ 26 km/h (16 mph)
- Factor of adh.
  - Starting: 25%
  - Continuous: 20%
- Brakeforce: 65% ratio @ 345 kPa (50.0 psi)
- Dynamic brake peak effort: 188 kN (42,000 lbf) @ 28 km/h (17 mph)
Career
- Operators: South African Railways; Spoornet; Transnet Freight Rail; National Railways of Zimbabwe; NLPI; Sheltam; Caminho de Ferro de Congo-Ocean; Camrail; Ferrovia Centro Atlântico; Ferrovia Sul Atlântico
- Class: Class 34-600
- Number in class: 100
- Numbers: 34-601 to 34-700
- Delivered: 1974–1976
- First run: 1974

The South African Railways Class 34-600 of 1974 is a diesel-electric locomotive.

Between December 1974 and July 1976, the South African Railways placed one hundred Class 34-600 General Motors Electro-Motive Division type GT26MC diesel-electric locomotives in service.

== Manufacturer ==
The Class 34-600 type GT26MC diesel-electric locomotive was designed by General Motors Electro-Motive Division and built for the South African Railways (SAR) by General Motors South Africa (GMSA) in Port Elizabeth. One hundred locomotives were delivered between December 1974 and July 1976, numbered in the range from 34-601 to 34-700.

=== Distinguishing features ===
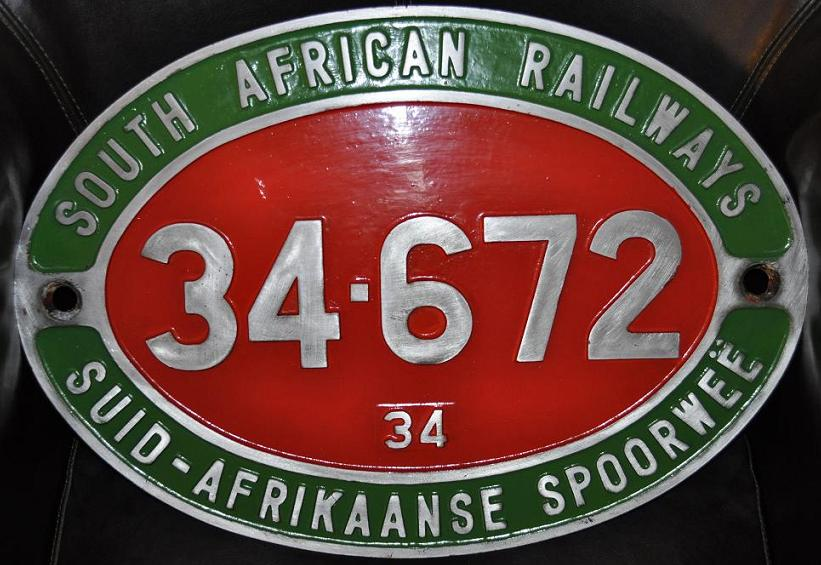

Of the GM-EMD Class 34 family of locomotives, Classes 34-200 and 34-600 units are visually indistinguishable from one another, but they can be distinguished from the Class 34-800 by the thicker fishbelly shaped sills on their left hand sides compared to the straight sill on the left hand side of the Class 34-800.

== Rebuilding and modification ==
=== Class 39-000 ===
The Class 39-000 type GT26CU-3 diesel-electric locomotives were to be rebuilt from Class 34-600, 34-800 and 37-000 locomotives. The project commenced in 2005, using suitable frames from wrecked locomotives. Rebuilding was done at the Transwerk shops in Bloemfontein between 2006 and 2008.

It was intended to produce one hundred Class 39-000 locomotives but in spite of the technical success of the project, rebuilding was halted after completing the first five locomotives due to higher than anticipated cost. It was decided, instead of rebuilding old locomotives, to continue the program by building fifty new Class 39-200 locomotives from imported and locally produced components. Three Class 34-600 locomotives, numbers 34-620, 34-635 and 34-674, were rebuilt to Class 39-000 before the rebuilding project was halted.

=== Traction motor upgrade ===
In 2010, an upgrading project commenced at the Koedoespoort Transnet Rail Engineering shops to upgrade Class 34-600 locomotives by, amongst other modifications, replacing the GM-EMD D29B with GM-EMD D31 traction motors, thereby improving their performance to the standard of the Class 37-000.

Locomotives that are known to have undergone this upgrade are annotated "D31 TM" in the "Leased, rebuilt or sold to" column in the table.

== Service ==
=== South African Railways ===
In SAR, Spoornet and Transnet Freight Rail (TFR) service, the Class 34-600s worked on most mainlines and some unelectrified branch lines in the central, eastern, northern and northeastern parts of South Africa.

=== National Railways of Zimbabwe ===
From at least 1988 until at least 1992, the National Railways of Zimbabwe (NRZ) hired type GT26MC Class 34-600 locomotives from the SAR and later Spoornet. Locomotives which were observed to be working on the NRZ between April 1988 and September 1992 are annotated "NRZ" in the "Leased, rebuilt or sold to" column in the.

=== NLPI Ltd. ===
NLPI Limited, abbreviated from New Limpopo Projects Investments, a Mauritius-registered company, specialises in private sector investments by using the build-operate-transfer (BOT) concept. It had three connected railway operations in Zimbabwe and Zambia which formed a rail link between South Africa and the Democratic Republic of Congo.

- The Beitbridge Bulawayo Railway (BBR), commissioned on 1 September 1999, operates the Beit Bridge to Bulawayo line in Zimbabwe.
- Since February 2004, NLPI Logistics (NLL or LOG) operates between Bulawayo and Victoria Falls on the Zimbabwe-Zambia border.
- Since February 2003, the Railway Systems of Zambia (RSZ) operated on the former Zambian Railways (ZR) from Victoria Falls to Sakania in the Congo.

In Zambia, the RSZ locomotive fleet included former ZR locomotives, but the rest of the locomotive fleet of all three operations consisted of South African GM-EMD Classes 34-200, 34-600 and 34-800 and GE Classes 35-000 and 35-400 locomotives from Spoornet and later TFR. These locomotives were sometimes marked or branded as either BBR or LOG or both, but their status, whether leased or loaned, was unclear since they were still on the TFR roster and still often worked in South Africa as well.

Class 34-600 locomotives which served with NLPI include the locomotives annotated "NLPI" in the "Leased, rebuilt or sold to" column in the table.

Zambia Railways, the state-owned holding company, resumed control of the Zambian national rail network on 11 September 2012. This followed the Zambian government's decision to revoke the operating concession awarded to RSZ after Finance Minister Alexander Chikwanda claimed that RSZ had "blatantly disregarded the provisions of the agreement" and had been "acting in a manner prejudicial to the interests of Zambians".

=== Sheltam ===
One of the Class 34-600 locomotives, no. 34-640, was sold to Sheltam, a locomotive hire and repair company based at the Douglas Colliery near Witbank in Mpumalanga which undertakes complete operating contracts and maintenance contracts. By the turn of the millennium, Sheltam locomotives were operating at Randfontein Estates Gold Mine in Gauteng, in Mpumalanga at Douglas and Vandyksdrift Collieries and at SAPPI, Ngodwana. They also operated on Spoornet's Newcastle-Utrecht branch in KwaZulu-Natal and on Kei Rail in the Eastern Cape. Outside South Africa, they operated on the BBR, NLL and RSZ lines through Zimbabwe and Zambia and in the Democratic Republic of the Congo.

=== Chemin de Fer Congo-Ocean ===
Six Class 34-600 locomotives were leased to the Congolese railway, the Chemin de Fer Congo-Ocean (CFCO), where they were renumbered in the range from CC801 to CC806.

=== Camrail ===
Six more locomotives which were at one time erroneously believed to have also gone to CFCO in the Congo, are now believed to have gone to Camrail in the Republic of Cameroon in about 2002, where they were renumbered in the range from CC2601 to CC2606. The order of their renumbering is not known.

=== Ferrovia Centro Atlântico ===
Five Class 34-600 locomotives went to Ferrovia Centro Atlântico (FCA) at Divinipolis in Brazil, where they run on 1,000 mm (3 ft 3 3/8 in) metre gauge. While they were initially part of Spoornet Traction's leasing scheme, they were later renumbered onto the FCA roster in the number range from 8226 to 8230.

=== Ferrovia Sul Atlântico ===
Ten Class 34-600 locomotives went to Ferrovia Sul Atlântico (FSA) at Curitiba in Brazil, where they also run on Metre gauge. While they were also initially part of Spoornet Traction's leasing scheme, they were later renumbered onto the FSA roster in the number range from 8231 to 8240.

== Works numbers ==
The builder's works numbers of Class 34-600 locomotives as well as their known disposal and deployment are listed in the table.

Class 34-600, GM-EMD type GT26MC
Loco no.	GMSA works no.	Leased, rebuilt or sold to	New no.
34-601	101-1		
34-602	101-2		
34-603	101-3		
34-604	101-4	FCA	8226
34-605	101-5		
34-606	101-6	NRZ	
34-607	101-7		
34-608	101-8		
34-609	101-9		
34-610	101-10		
34-611	101-11		
34-612	101-12		
34-613	101-13		
34-614	101-14		
34-615	101-15		
34-616	101-16		
34-617	101-17		
34-618	101-18	FSA	8231
34-619	101-19	Camrail	
34-620	101-20	Class 39-000	39-004
34-621	101-21	NRZ	
34-622	101-22		
34-623	101-23	NLPI	
34-624	101-24		
34-625	101-25	NRZ	
34-626	101-26		
34-627	101-27		
34-628	101-28	FSA	8232
34-629	101-29		
34-630	101-30	FSA	8233
34-631	101-31		
34-632	101-32	FCA	8228
34-633	101-33		
34-634	101-34		
34-635	101-35	Class 39-000	39-001
34-636	101-36		
34-637	101-37		
34-638	101-38		
34-639	101-39		
34-640	101-40	Sheltam	18/2604
34-641	101-41	NLPI	
34-642	101-42		
34-643	101-43		
34-644	101-44	NRZ/Camrail	
34-645	101-45		
34-646	101-46	FSA	8234
34-647	101-47	NLPI/D31 TM	
34-648	101-48	NRZ/NLPI	
34-649	101-49		
34-650	101-50	NLPI	
34-651	101-51		
34-652	101-52		
34-653	101-53		
34-654	101-54		
34-655	101-55	Camrail	
34-656	101-56	FSA	8235
34-657	101-57	FSA	8236
34-658	101-58		
34-659	101-59	FCA	8229
34-660	101-60	NRZ/Camrail	
34-661	101-61	NRZ/Camrail	
34-662	101-62	CFCO	CC804
34-663	101-63	CFCO	CC805
34-664	101-64		
34-665	101-65		
34-666	101-66	NLPI	
34-667	101-67		
34-668	101-68	NRZ/NLPI/D31 TM	
34-669	101-69	FSA	8237
34-670	101-70	CFCO	CC806
34-671	101-71	CFCO	CC803
34-672	101-72		
34-673	101-73	FSA	8238
34-674	101-74	NRZ/Class 39-000	39-003
34-675	101-75		
34-676	101-76	NRZ	
34-677	101-77	FSA	8239
34-678	101-78	NLPI	
34-679	101-79		
34-680	101-80	NRZ/CFCO	CC801
34-681	101-81	NRZ	
34-682	101-82	NRZ/CFCO	CC802
34-683	101-83	FCA	8227
34-684	101-84	Camrail	
34-685	101-85		
34-686	101-86	NRZ/D31 TM	
34-687	101-87		
34-688	101-88	FCA	8230
34-689	101-89		
34-690	101-90	NRZ	
34-691	101-91	NLPI	
34-692	101-92	FSA	8240
34-693	101-93	NLPI	
34-694	101-94	NLPI	
34-695	101-95		
34-696	101-96	NRZ/NLPI	
34-697	101-97		
34-698	101-98	NLPI	
34-699	101-99		
34-700	101-100		

== Liveries ==
The Class 34-600 were all delivered in the SAR Gulf Red livery with signal red buffer beams, yellow side stripes on the long hood sides and a yellow V on each end. In the 1990s many of the Class 34-600 units began to be repainted in the Spoornet orange livery with a yellow and blue chevron pattern on the buffer beams. Two known locomotives, numbers 34-651 and 34-652, were painted in Spoornet's orange era Blue Train livery. Some later received the Spoornet Traction maroon livery. After 2008 in the Transnet Freight Rail (TFR) era, some were repainted in the TFR red, green and yellow livery.

== Illustration ==
Depicted below is no. 34-652 in Spoornet's Blue Train livery, incorrectly numbered as a Class 84-000 on the cabside. The error was corrected later. Other liveries which were applied to Class 34-600 locomotives are also illustrated.

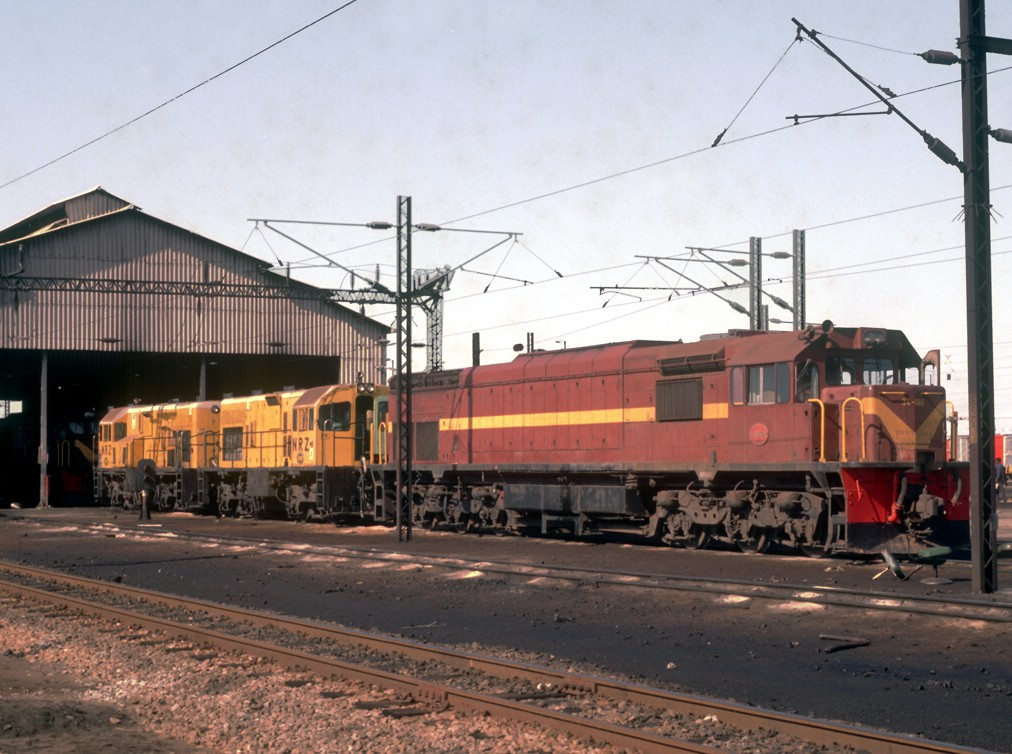
No. 34-660 in SAR Gulf Red and whiskers, Dabuka, Zimbabwe, 22 February 1992

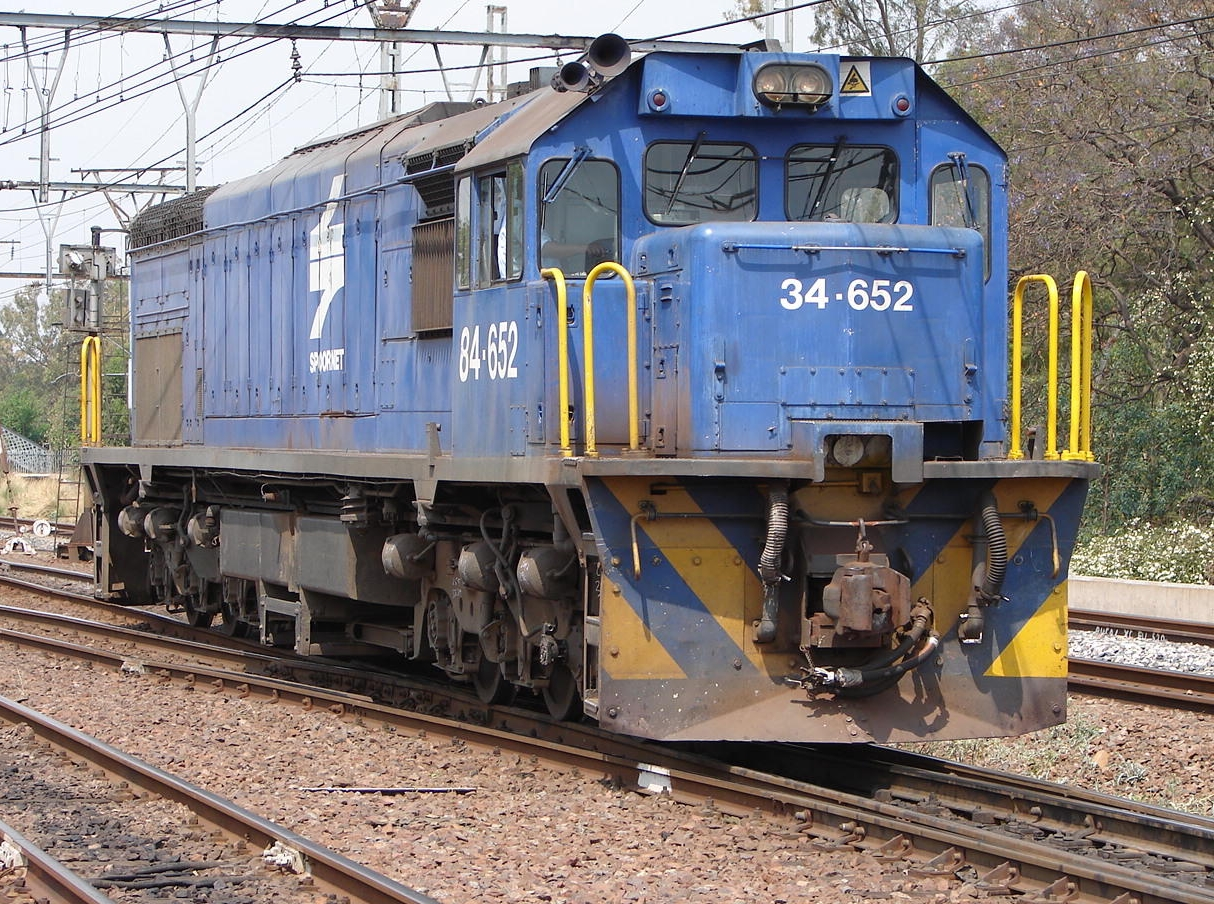
Blue Train no. 34-652 at Capital Park, 2 October 2006, incorrectly numbered 84-652

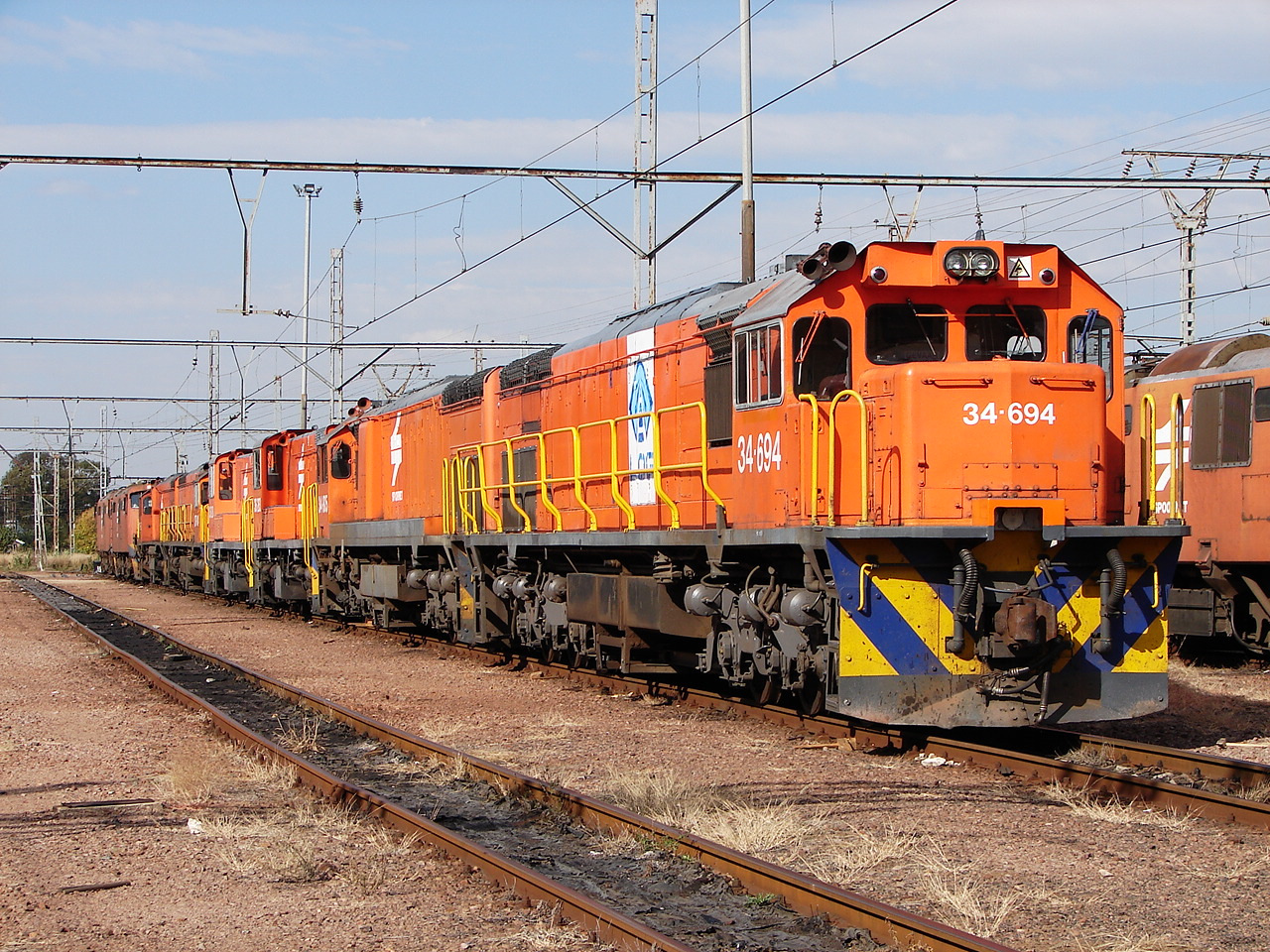
No. 34-694 in Spoornet orange with NLPI LOG emblems, Capital Park, 10 May 2013

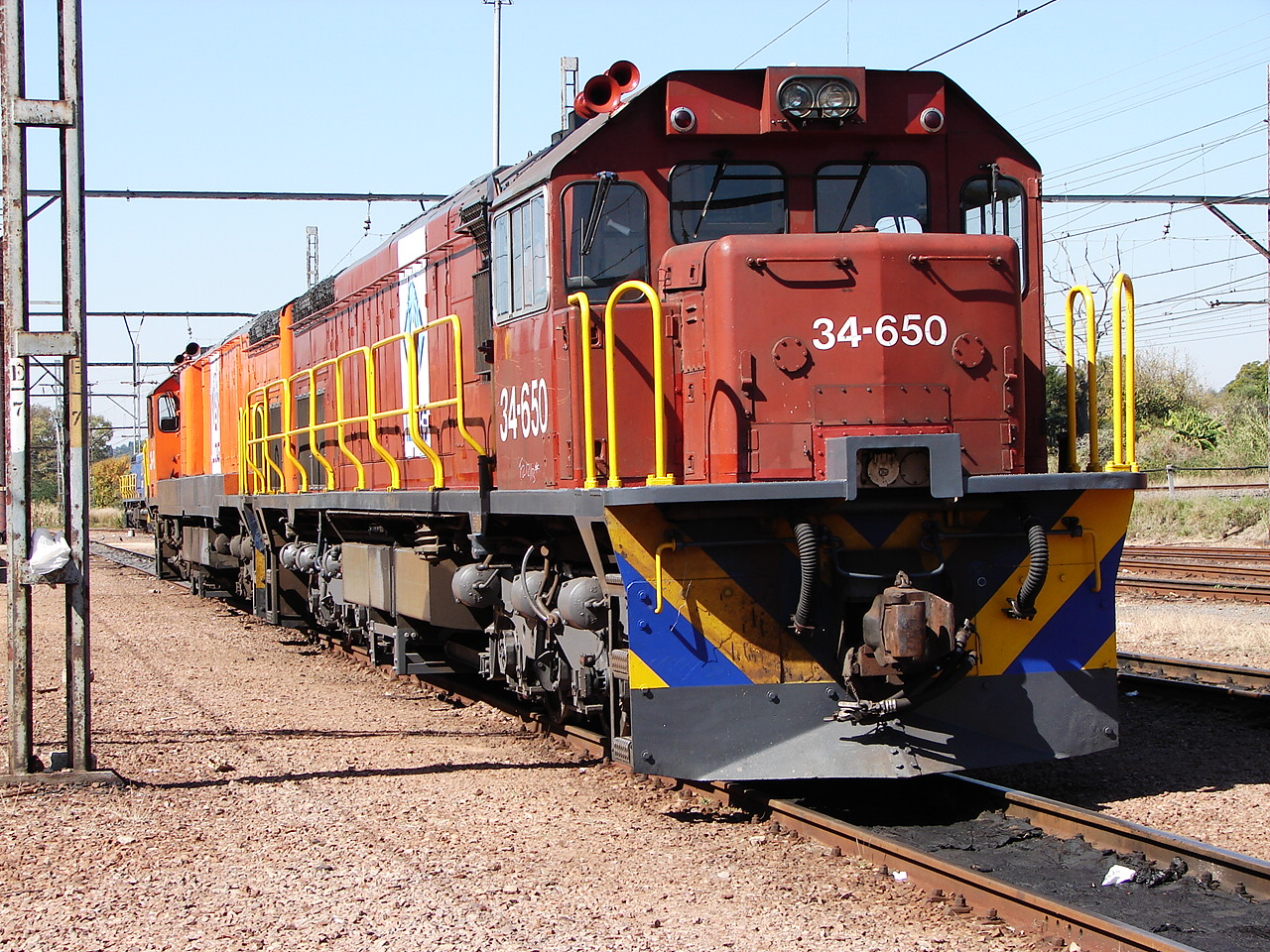
No. 34-650 in Spoornet maroon with NLPI LOG emblems, Capital Park, 6 May 2013

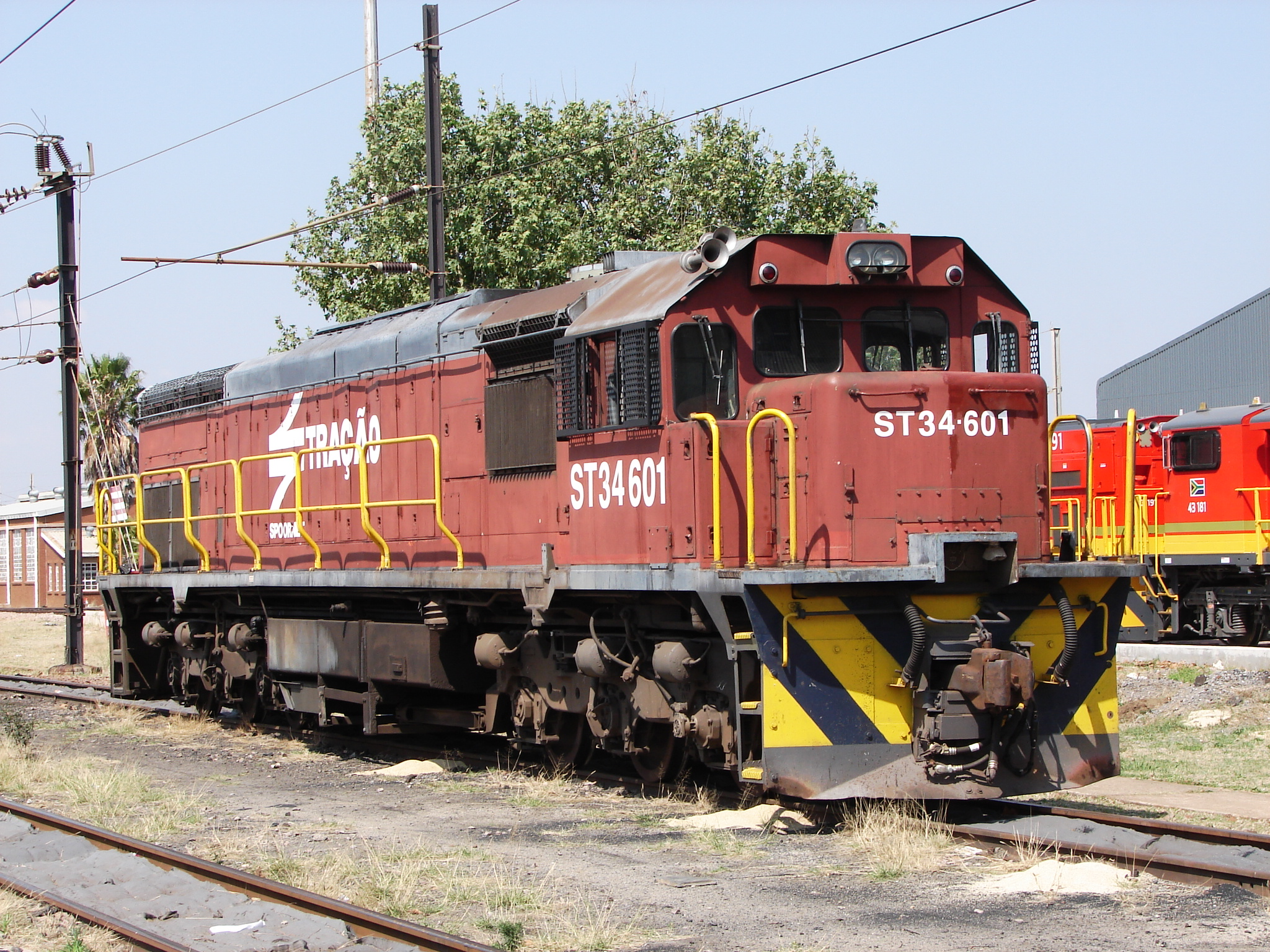
No. 34-601 with TRAÇÃO markings for Brazil, Pyramid South, 22 September 2015

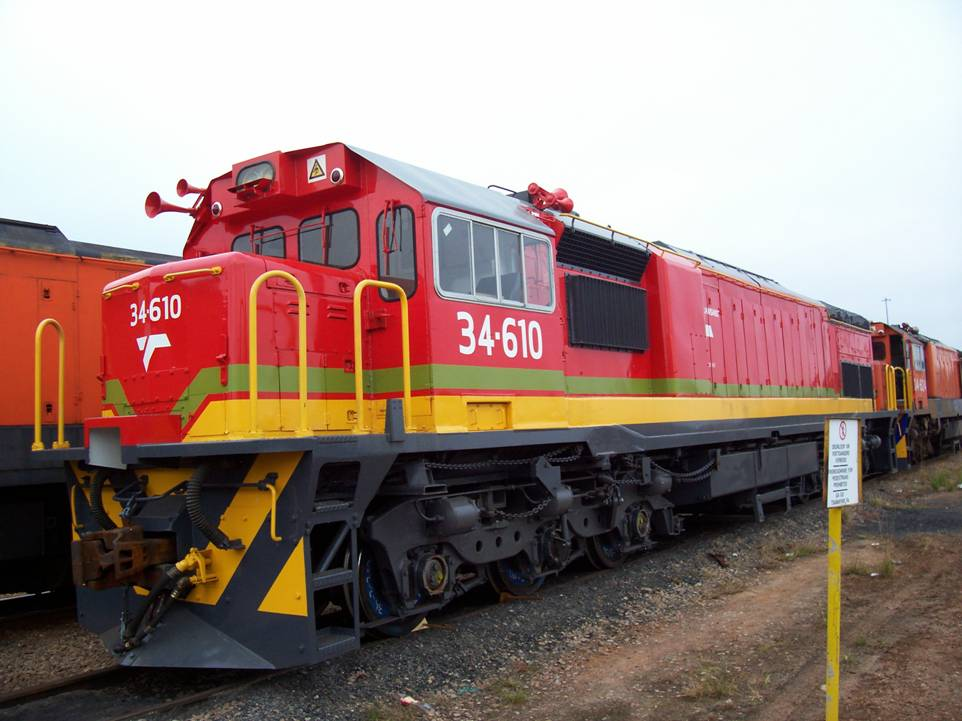
No. 34-610 in Transnet Freight Rail livery, Koedoespoort, Pretoria, 20 May 2011
