= South African Class 37-000 =

Class of South African locomotives

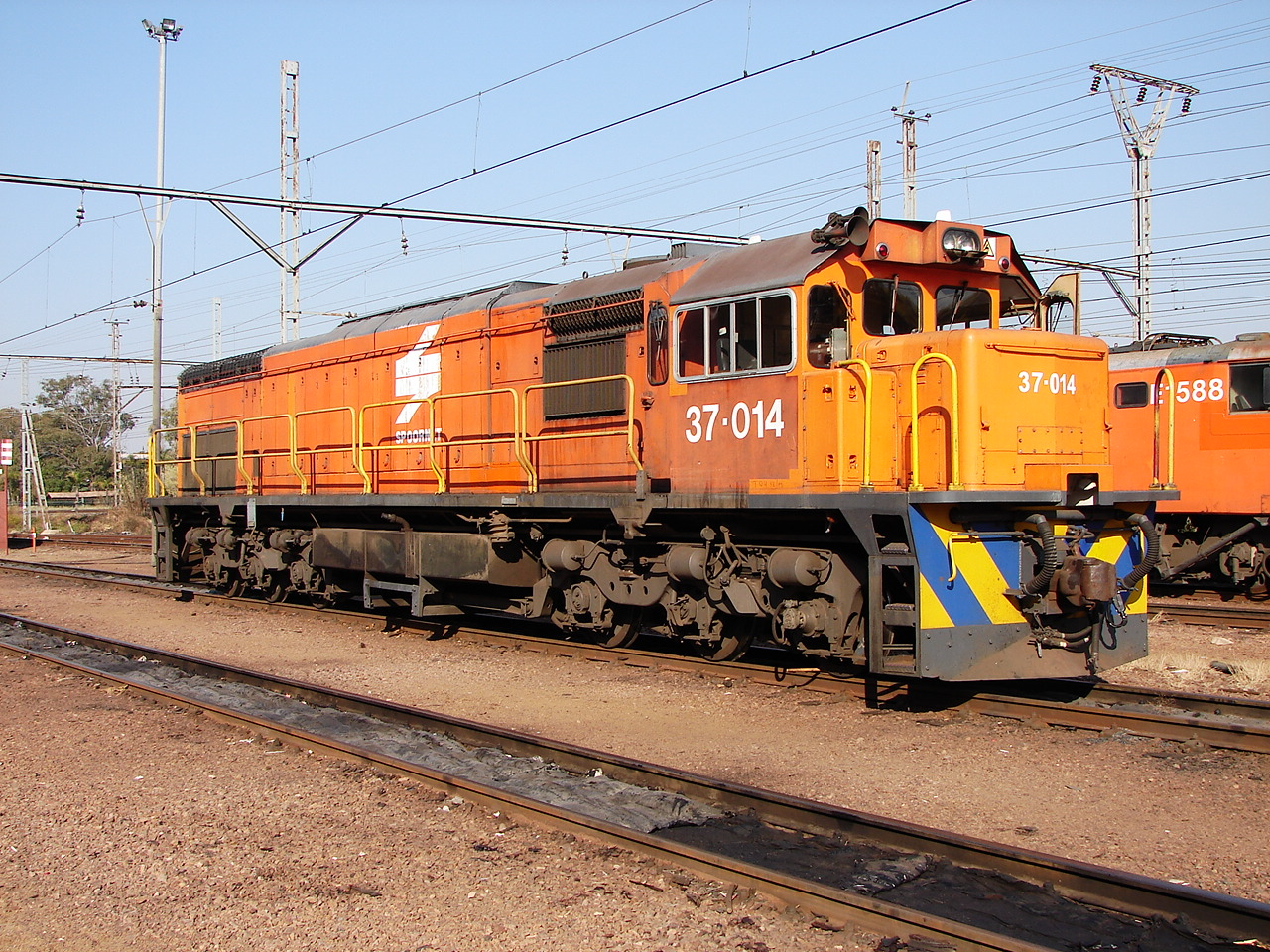
- No. 37-014 at Capital Park, Pretoria, 16 May 2013
Type and origin
- Power type: Diesel-electric
- Designer: General Motors Electro-Motive Division
- Builder: General Motors South Africa
- Serial number: 116-1 to 116-100
- Model: GM-EMD GT26M2C
- Build date: 1981-1982
- Total produced: 100
- Rebuilder: Electro-Motive Sibanye
- Rebuild date: 2008
- Number rebuilt: 1 to Sibanye no. STS 001
Specifications
- Configuration
  - AAR: C-C
  - UIC: Co′Co′
  - Commonwealth: Co+Co
- Gauge: 3 ft 6 in (1,067 mm) Cape gauge
- Wheel diameter: 1,016 mm (40.0 in)
- Wheelbase: 14,732 mm (48 ft 4.0 in)
  - Bogie: 3,632 mm (11 ft 11.0 in)
- Pivot centres: 11,278 mm (37 ft 0 in)
- Length
  - Over couplers: 19,202 mm (63 ft 0 in)
- Width: 2,819 mm (9 ft 3.0 in)
- Height: 3,924 mm (12 ft 10.5 in)
- Axle load: 21,000 kg (46,000 lb)
- Adhesive weight: 126,000 kg (278,000 lb)
- Loco weight: 126,000 kg (278,000 lb) max
- Fuel type: Diesel
- Fuel capacity: 6,230 litres (1,370 imp gal)
- Prime mover: GM-EMD 16-645E3B
- RPM range: 250-900
  - RPM low idle: 250
  - RPM idle: 315
  - Maximum RPM: 900
- Engine type: 2-stroke diesel
- Aspiration: GM-EMD E16 turbocharger
- Displacement: 10.57 litres (645 cu in) per cylinder
- Alternator: 10 pole 3 phase GM-EMD AR10-D14
- Traction motors: Six GM-EMD D31 DC 4 pole
  - Rating 1 hour: 545A
  - Continuous: 520A @ 21 km/h (13 mph)
- Cylinders: V16
- Gear ratio: 63:14
- MU working: 6 maximum
- Loco brake: 28-LAV-1 with vigilance control
- Train brakes: Gardner-Denver ADJV-8401 compressor/exhauster
- Air tank cap.: 850 litres (190 imp gal)
- Compressor: 0.021 m^{3}/s (0.74 cu ft/s)
- Exhauster: 0.096 m^{3}/s (3.4 cu ft/s)
- Couplers: AAR knuckle type E
Performance figures
- Maximum speed: 100 km/h (62 mph)
- Power output
  - Starting: 2,342 kW (3,141 hp)
  - Continuous: 2,171 kW (2,911 hp)
- Tractive effort
  - Starting: 306 kN (69,000 lbf) @ 25% adh.
  - Continuous: 245 kN (55,000 lbf) @ 26 km/h (16 mph)
- Factor of adh.
  - Starting: 25%
  - Continuous: 20%
- Brakeforce: 61% ratio @ 350 kPa (51 psi)
- Dynamic brake peak effort: 216 kN (49,000 lbf) @ 28 km/h (17 mph)
Career
- Operators: South African Railways; Spoornet; Transnet Freight Rail
- Class: Class 37-000
- Number in class: 100
- Numbers: 37-001 to 37-100
- Delivered: 1981-1982
- First run: 1981

The South African Railways Class 37-000 of 1981 is a mainline diesel-electric locomotive.

Between May 1981 and 1982, the South African Railways placed one hundred Class 37-000 General Motors Electro-Motive Division type GT26M2C diesel-electric locomotives in service. After these locomotives were commissioned, the national carrier was not to invest in new diesel-electric locomotives again until 2009, nearly three decades later.

== Manufacturer ==
The Class 37-000 type GT26M2C diesel-electric locomotive was designed for the South African Railways (SAR) by General Motors Electro-Motive Division (GM-EMD) and built by General Motors South Africa (GMSA) in Port Elizabeth. Equipped with later model GM-EMD D31 traction motors instead of the earlier GM-EMD D29B, it is a more powerful version of the GM-EMD type GT26MC Classes 34-200, 34-600 and 34-800.

== Service ==
The Class 37-000 locomotives work on mainlines in the northern and northeastern parts of the country. Most of them are shedded at Ermelo and Lydenburg in Mpumalanga and at Richards Bay in KwaZulu-Natal. They work on the Belfast-Steelpoort line and on the manganese route between the Mpumalanga Lowveld and KwaZulu-Natal from Komatipoort through Swaziland to Empangeni and Richards Bay.

On the Natal South Coast line, Classes 34-200 and 37-000 worked the Simuma-Mount Vernon clinker trains as long ago as 2002 while the line was still electrified, although the Class 34-200 were more common when the train ran behind diesel-electrics. Since diesel officially took over the workings at the end of October 2011 and electrics were rarely seen until disappearing from the South Coast completely in March 2012, only the Class 37-000 have been used, normally in sets of three.

=== Sun City Express ===
On Saturday 4 March 1989 Sol Kerzner's Sun City Express began running. It consisted of a dedicated rake of thirteen coaches hauled by a Class 37-000 locomotive that ran between Johannesburg, Pretoria and a rural halt that was specially created near Sun City where the railway line crossed the Sun City-Thabazimbi road near Heystekrand. Passengers transferred to buses for the 10 kilometres (6 miles) trip between Sun City Halt and the Sun City Casino and Hotel near Rustenburg.

Locomotive no. 37-044 was re-geared for higher speed and painted in a maroon livery with gray sills and understructure, yellow buffer beams and golden yellow bands all around the body, interrupted on the sides by the inscription The Sun City EXPRESS in white.

Although initially well received, the train began to suffer from declining patronage and was eventually cancelled from Monday 30 March 1992, three years after its launch.

== Rebuilding to Class 39-000 ==
In 2005, a project commenced to rebuild new Class 39-000 type GM-EMD GT26CU-3 diesel-electric locomotives for Spoornet from Classes 34-600, 34-800 and 37-000 locomotives, using suitable frames from wrecked locomotives. Two companies were invited to produce prototypes for the project.

=== Number 39-251 ===
One of these companies was Electro-Motive Sibanye, a joint venture between the newly established Electro-Motive Diesel (EMD) and Sibanye Trade and Services, a South African Black Economic Empowerment (BEE) company dealing with locomotives and spare parts. The Sibanye venture produced only one locomotive, rebuilt from Class 37-000 no. 37-010 in 2008 and numbered 39-251. However, the locomotive was tested and rejected by Transnet, reportedly due to poor quality. Furthermore, when serious tender irregularities came to light, the locomotive rebuilding deal between Transnet and Electro-Motive Sibanye was cancelled.

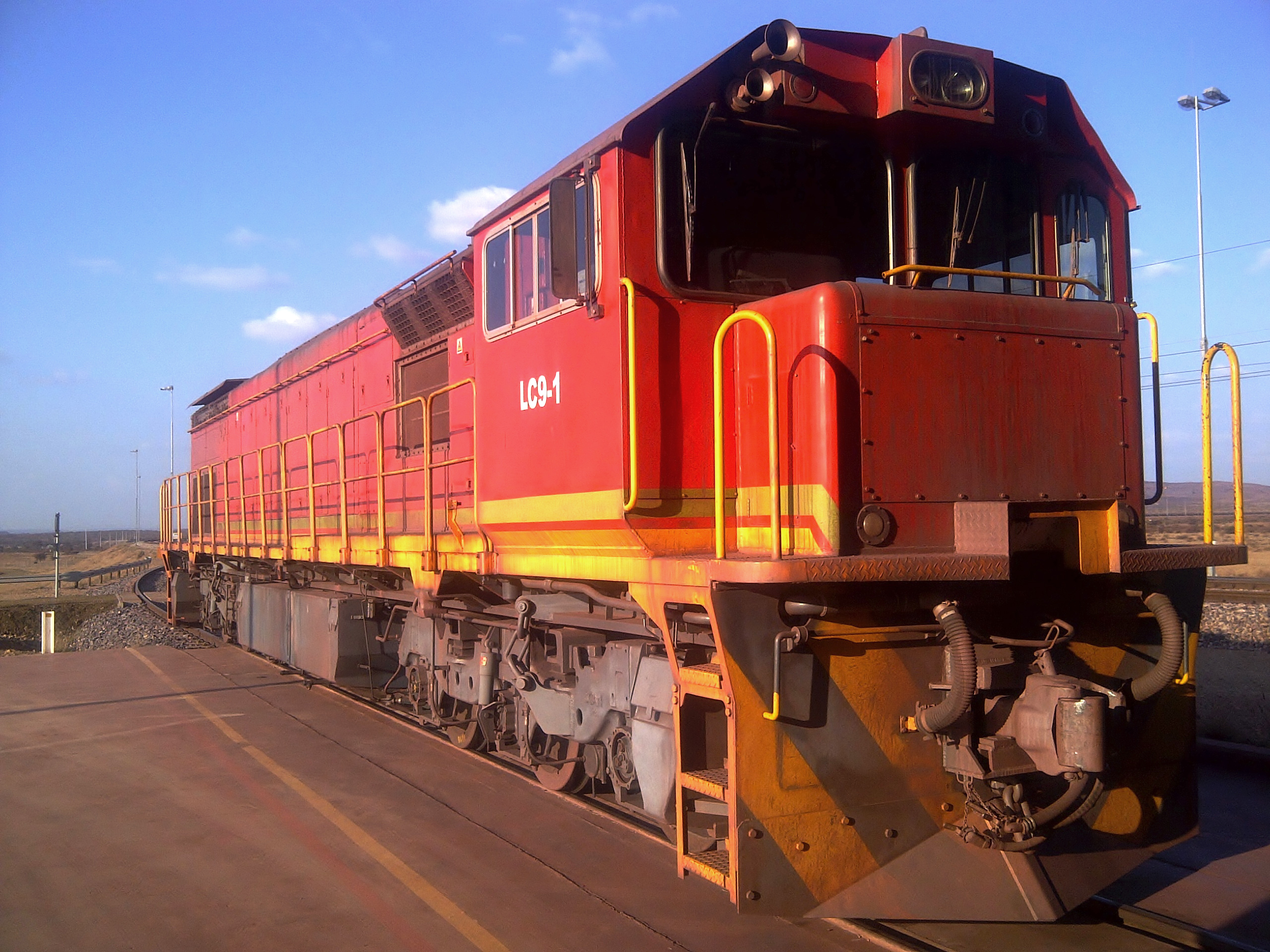
Locomotive no. 39-251

Although it was initially painted in the red Transnet Freight Rail livery, no. 39-251 never worked for Transnet and was later reported as sold to RRL, a company which came about out of the abortive joint venture between EMD and Sibanye. RRL is based at a workshop in the old Pretoria Steel Works complex and several of its locomotives are active in the gold fields around Welkom in the Free State. No. 39-251 remained in the possession of Sibanye Trade and Services and was renumbered STS 001. It was later hired or leased to the Khumani iron ore mine in the Northern Cape and renumbered again to LC9-1.

=== Numbers 39-001 to 39-005 ===
The other company was Transwerk (later Transnet Rail Engineering and then Transnet Engineering), who produced five locomotives in its shops in Bloemfontein between 2006 and 2008, rebuilt from three Class 34-600s and two Class 34-800s. These were tested and approved by Transnet and placed in service as the Class 39-000, numbered in the range from 39-001 to 39-005.

=== End of project ===
It was intended to produce one hundred Class 39-000s, but in spite of the technical success of the Transnet Rail Engineering part of the project, rebuilding was halted after completing the first five units due to higher than anticipated cost. It was decided, instead of rebuilding old locomotives, to rather continue the program by building fifty new Class 39-200 locomotives from imported and locally produced components. Only one Class 37-000 locomotive was therefore rebuilt.

== Works numbers ==
The Class 37-000 builder's works numbers and the one rebuilding are listed in the table.

Class 37-000, GM-EMD type GT26M2C
| Loco no. | Works no. | Date | Rebuilt to |
|---|---|---|---|
| 37-001 | 116-1 | 1981 | |
| 37-002 | 116-2 | 1981 | |
| 37-003 | 116-3 | 1981 | |
| 37-004 | 116-4 | 1981 | |
| 37-005 | 116-5 | 1981 | |
| 37-006 | 116-6 | 1981 | |
| 37-007 | 116-7 | 1981 | |
| 37-008 | 116-8 | 1981 | |
| 37-009 | 116-9 | 1981 | |
| 37-010 | 116-10 | 1981 | 39-251 |
| 37-011 | 116-11 | 1981 | |
| 37-012 | 116-12 | 1981 | |
| 37-013 | 116-13 | 1981 | |
| 37-014 | 116-14 | 1981 | |
| 37-015 | 116-15 | 1981 | |
| 37-016 | 116-16 | 1981 | |
| 37-017 | 116-17 | 1981 | |
| 37-018 | 116-18 | 1981 | |
| 37-019 | 116-19 | 1981 | |
| 37-020 | 116-20 | 1981 | |
| 37-021 | 116-21 | 1981 | |
| 37-022 | 116-22 | 1981 | |
| 37-023 | 116-23 | 1981 | |
| 37-024 | 116-24 | 1981 | |
| 37-025 | 116-25 | 1981 | |
| 37-026 | 116-26 | 1981 | |
| 37-027 | 116-27 | 1981 | |
| 37-028 | 116-28 | 1981 | |
| 37-029 | 116-29 | 1981 | |
| 37-030 | 116-30 | 1981 | |
| 37-031 | 116-31 | 1981 | |
| 37-032 | 116-32 | 1981 | |
| 37-033 | 116-33 | 1981 | |
| 37-034 | 116-34 | 1981 | |
| 37-035 | 116-35 | 1981 | |
| 37-036 | 116-36 | 1981 | |
| 37-037 | 116-37 | 1981 | |
| 37-038 | 116-38 | 1981 | |
| 37-039 | 116-39 | 1981 | |
| 37-040 | 116-40 | 1981-82 | |
| 37-041 | 116-41 | 1981-82 | |
| 37-042 | 116-42 | 1981-82 | |
| 37-043 | 116-43 | 1981-82 | |
| 37-044 | 116-44 | 1981-82 | |
| 37-045 | 116-45 | 1981-82 | |
| 37-046 | 116-46 | 1981-82 | |
| 37-047 | 116-47 | 1982 | |
| 37-048 | 116-48 | 1982 | |
| 37-049 | 116-49 | 1982 | |
| 37-050 | 116-50 | 1982 | |
| 37-051 | 116-51 | 1982 | |
| 37-052 | 116-52 | 1982 | |
| 37-053 | 116-53 | 1982 | |
| 37-054 | 116-54 | 1982 | |
| 37-055 | 116-55 | 1982 | |
| 37-056 | 116-56 | 1982 | |
| 37-057 | 116-57 | 1982 | |
| 37-058 | 116-58 | 1982 | |
| 37-059 | 116-59 | 1982 | |
| 37-060 | 116-60 | 1982 | |
| 37-061 | 116-61 | 1982 | |
| 37-062 | 116-62 | 1982 | |
| 37-063 | 116-63 | 1982 | |
| 37-064 | 116-64 | 1982 | |
| 37-065 | 116-65 | 1982 | |
| 37-066 | 116-66 | 1982 | |
| 37-067 | 116-67 | 1982 | |
| 37-068 | 116-68 | 1982 | |
| 37-069 | 116-69 | 1982 | |
| 37-070 | 116-70 | 1982 | |
| 37-071 | 116-71 | 1982 | |
| 37-072 | 116-72 | 1982 | |
| 37-073 | 116-73 | 1982 | |
| 37-074 | 116-74 | 1982 | |
| 37-075 | 116-75 | 1982 | |
| 37-076 | 116-76 | 1982 | |
| 37-077 | 116-77 | 1982 | |
| 37-078 | 116-78 | 1982 | |
| 37-079 | 116-79 | 1982 | |
| 37-080 | 116-80 | 1982 | |
| 37-081 | 116-81 | 1982 | |
| 37-082 | 116-82 | 1982 | |
| 37-083 | 116-83 | 1982 | |
| 37-084 | 116-84 | 1982 | |
| 37-085 | 116-85 | 1982 | |
| 37-086 | 116-86 | 1982 | |
| 37-087 | 116-87 | 1982 | |
| 37-088 | 116-88 | 1982 | |
| 37-089 | 116-89 | 8 Jul 1982 | |
| 37-090 | 116-90 | 1982 | |
| 37-091 | 116-91 | 1982 | |
| 37-092 | 116-92 | 1982 | |
| 37-093 | 116-93 | 1982 | |
| 37-094 | 116-94 | 1982 | |
| 37-095 | 116-95 | 1982 | |
| 37-096 | 116-96 | 1982 | |
| 37-097 | 116-97 | 1982 | |
| 37-098 | 116-98 | 1982 | |
| 37-099 | 116-99 | 1982 | |
| 37-100 | 116-100 | 1982 | |

== Liveries ==
The Class 37-000 were all delivered in the SAR Gulf Red livery with signal red buffer beams, yellow side stripes on the long hood sides and a yellow V on each end. In the 1990s many of them began to be repainted in the Spoornet orange livery with a yellow and blue chevron pattern on the buffer beams. At least two, numbers 37-050 and 37-059, later received the Spoornet maroon livery. In the late 1990s a few were repainted in the Spoornet blue livery with outline numbers on the long hood sides. After 2008 in the Transnet Freight Rail (TFR) era, some were repainted in the TFR red, green and yellow livery.

== Illustration ==
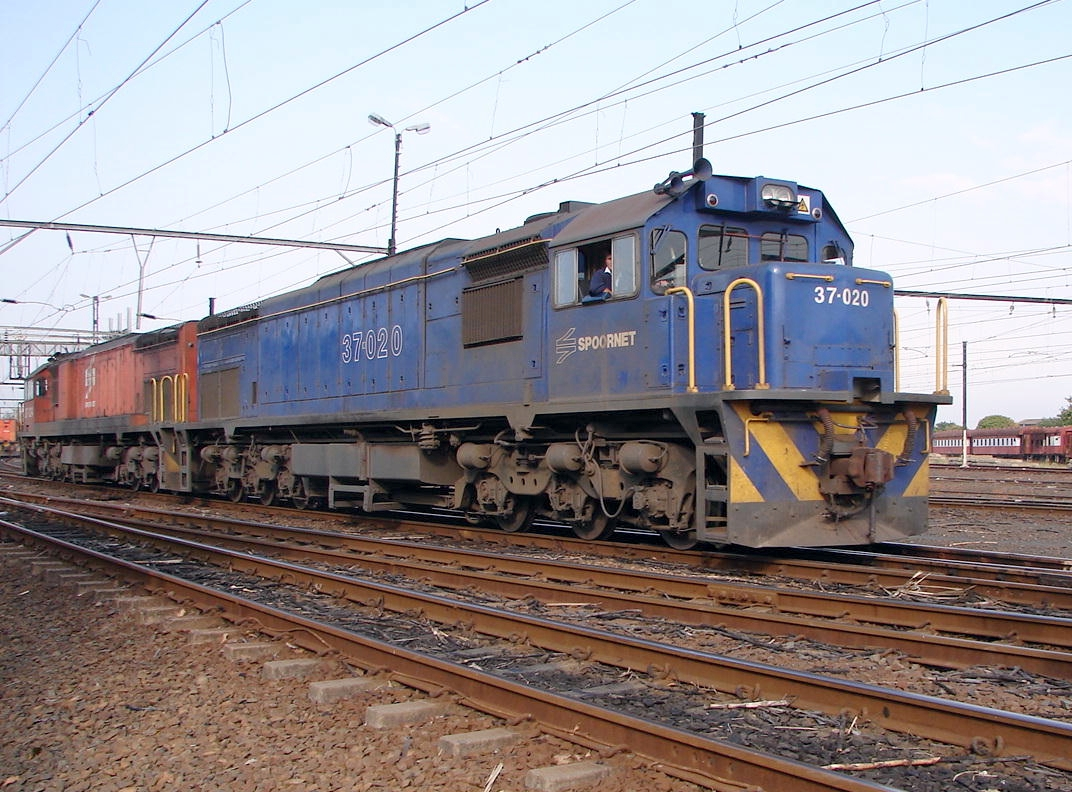
No. 37-020 in Spoornet blue with outline numbers at Empangeni, 14 August 2007

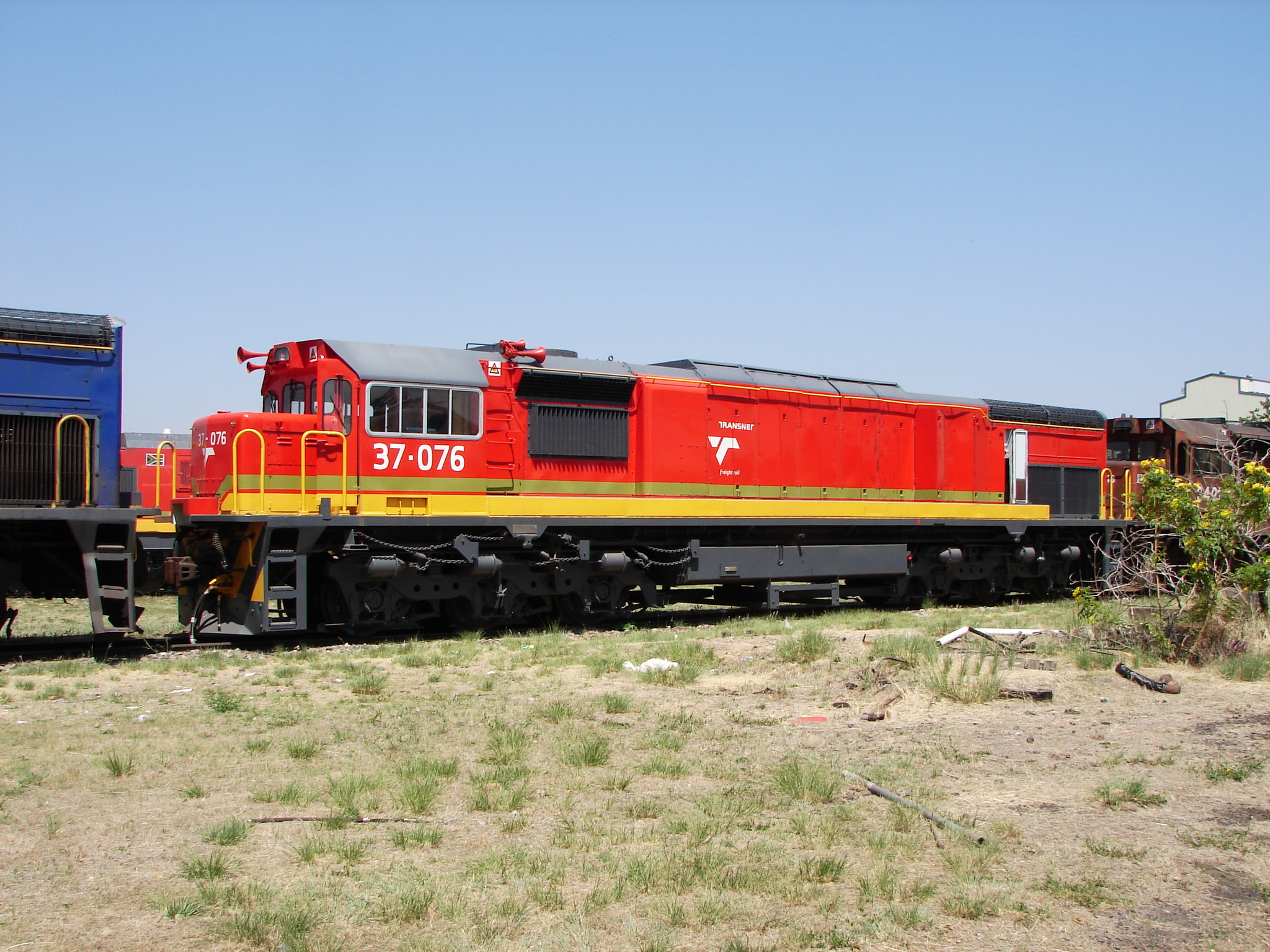
No. 37-076 in Transnet Freight Rail livery at Koedoespoort, 29 September 2015
