= South African Class 39-000 =

South African diesel-electric locomotive

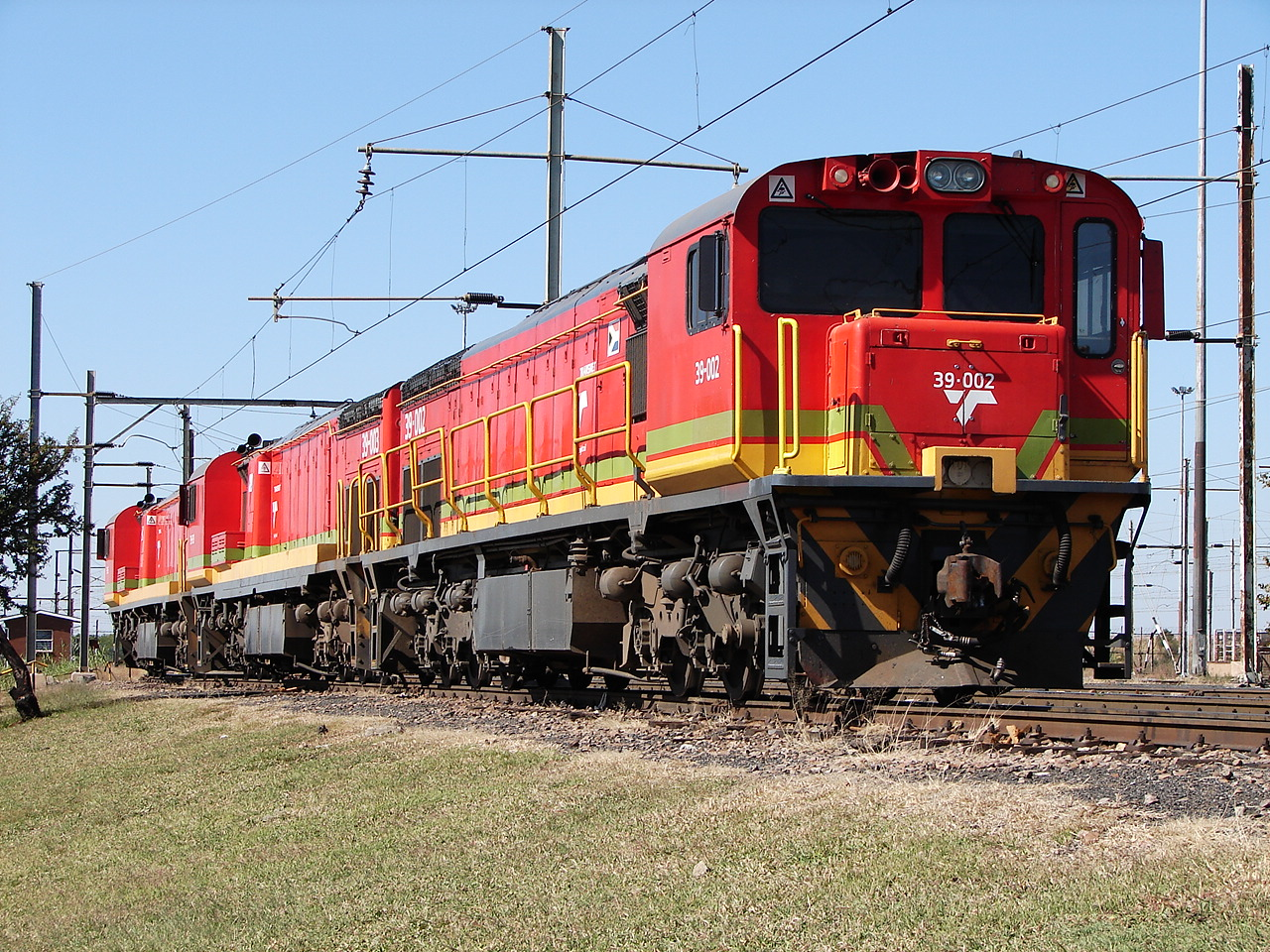
- No. 39-002 at Pyramid South Depot on 7 May 2013
Type and origin
- Power type: Diesel-electric
- Designer: General Motors Electro-Motive Division
- Builder: Transwerk; Transnet Rail Engineering
- Serial number: See table
- Model: EMD GT26CU-3
- Build date: 2006–2008
- Total produced: 5
Specifications
- Configuration
  - AAR: C-C
  - UIC: Co'Co'
  - Commonwealth: Co+Co
- Gauge: 3 ft 6 in (1,067 mm) Cape gauge
- Wheel diameter: 1,016 mm (40.0 in)
- Wheelbase: 14,732 mm (48 ft 4.0 in)
  - Bogie: 3,632 mm (11 ft 11.0 in)
- Pivot centres: 11,278 mm (37 ft 0 in)
- Length
  - Over couplers: 19,202 mm (63 ft 0 in)
- Fuel type: Diesel
- Prime mover: GM-EMD 16-645E3B
- Engine type: 2-stroke diesel
- Displacement: 10.57 litres (645.0 cu in)
- Traction motors: Six EMD D31 DC 4 pole
- Cylinders: V16
- Loco brake: Knorr-Bremse EBR
- Train brakes: Air & Vacuum
- Safety systems: ZTR Nexsys control system
- Couplers: AAR knuckle
Performance figures
- Power output: 2,460 kW (3,300 hp)
- Tractive effort
  - Starting: 350 kN (79,000 lbf)
  - Continuous: 305 kN (69,000 lbf)
- Factor of adh.
  - Starting: 25%
  - Continuous: 20%
Career
- Operators: Spoornet; Transnet Freight Rail
- Class: Class 39-000
- Number in class: 5
- Numbers: 39-001 to 39-005
- Delivered: 2006–2008
- First run: 2006

The Spoornet Class 39-000 of 2006 is a South African diesel-electric locomotive from the Spoornet era.

In 2005, Transwerk commenced a project of rebuilding one hundred existing locomotives to new Class 39-000 Electro-Motive Diesel type GT26CU-3 locomotives for Spoornet. Only five were eventually rebuilt and placed in service between April 2006 and 2009.

== Manufacturer ==
In 2005, a project commenced to rebuild one hundred Class 39-000 Electro-Motive Diesel (EMD) type GT26CU-3 diesel-electric locomotives for Spoornet from Classes 34-600 and 34-800 type GT26MC and Class 37-000 type GT26M2C locomotives. The original locomotives had all originally been designed by General Motors Electro-Motive Division (GM-EMD) and had been built by General Motors South Africa (GMSA) in Port Elizabeth between 1974 and 1981. Suitable frames from wrecked locomotives were to be used.

== Rebuilding ==
=== Number 39-251 ===
Two companies were invited to produce prototypes for the project. One was Electro-Motive Sibanye, a joint venture between the recently established Electro-Motive Diesel (EMD) and Sibanye Trade and Services, a South African Black Economic Empowerment (BEE) company which dealt in locomotives and spare parts. The Sibanye venture produced only one locomotive, which was rebuilt from Class 37-000 no. 37-010 in 2008 and numbered 39-251. The locomotive was tested, but rejected by Transnet, reportedly due to poor quality. Furthermore, when serious tender irregularities came to light, the locomotive rebuilding deal between Transnet and Sibanye was cancelled.

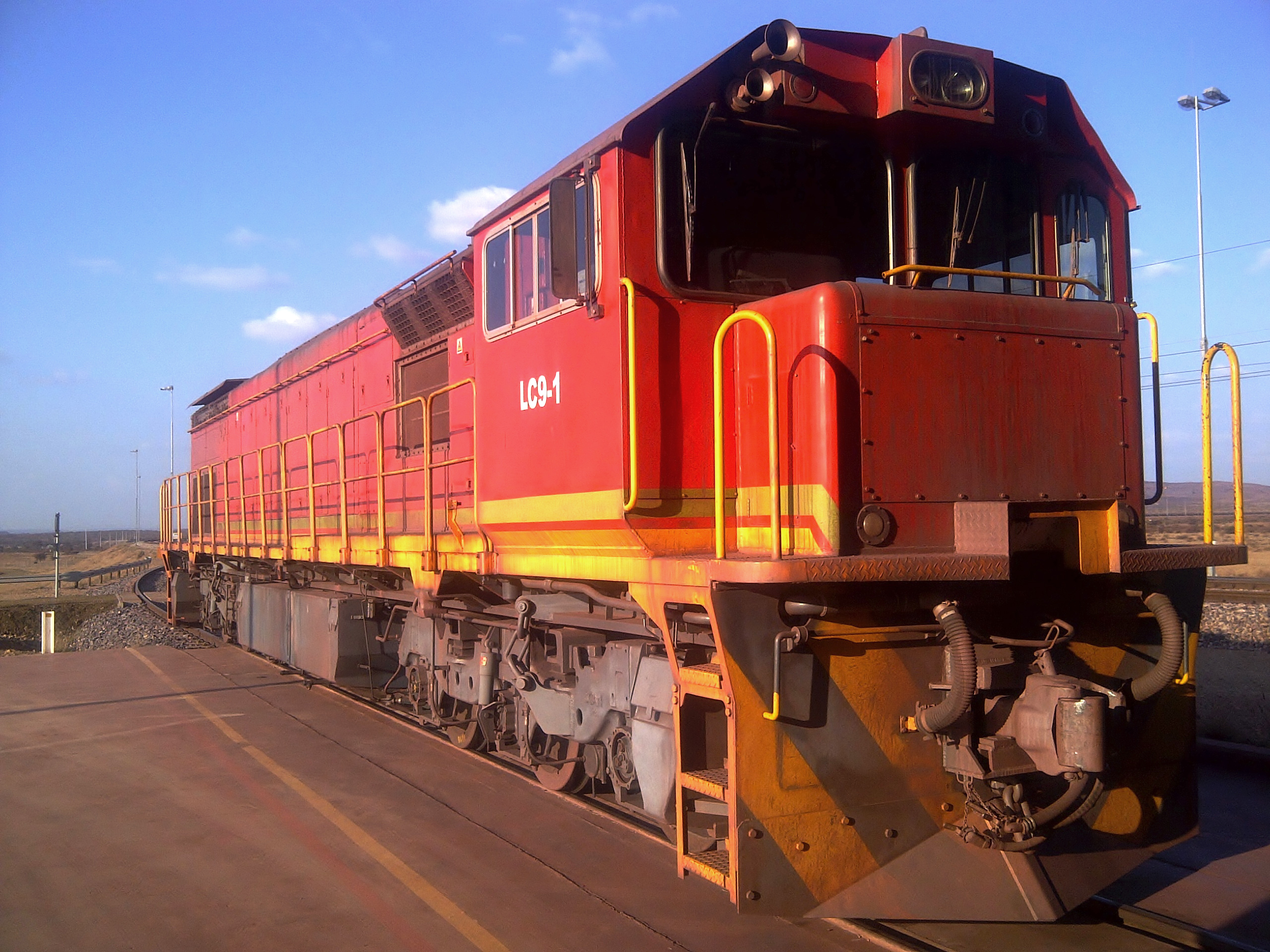
No. 39-251 as Khumani Iron Ore's LC9-1, 11 July 2013

Even though it was painted in the red Transnet Freight Rail livery, no. 39-251 never worked for Transnet.

The locomotive did have the distinctive cab roof profile of other locomotives in the EMD family, unlike the completely different rounded cab roof profile of its successful competitor. When the Electro-Motive Sibanye joint venture was dissolved, the locomotive remained in the possession of Sibanye Trade and Services and was renumbered STS 001. It was later hired or leased to the Khumani iron ore mine in the Northern Cape, where it was renumbered again to LC9-1.

=== Numbers 39-001 to 39-005 ===
The other company was Transwerk, later Transnet Rail Engineering (TRE) and then Transnet Engineering, who produced five locomotives at its Bloemfontein shops between 2005 and 2008, rebuilt from three wrecked Class 34-600 and two Class 34-800 locomotives. These five were tested and approved by Transnet and placed in service between April 2006 and 2009 as the Class 39-000, numbered in the range from 39-001 to 39-005.

It was intended to produce one hundred Class 39-000 locomotives, but in spite of the technical success of the TRE part of the project rebuilding was halted after completing five locomotives, allegedly due to higher than anticipated cost. Instead of rebuilding one hundred old locomotives, it was decided to rather continue the program by building fifty new Class 39-200 locomotives from imported and locally produced components. This was to take place at the Koedoespoort shops of TRE.

== Features ==
The original Class identity of each Class 39-000 locomotive can be visually determined by the difference between their left side sills. The three ex Class 34-600 locomotives have thicker fishbelly-shaped left sills, compared to the thinner straight left sills of the two ex Class 34-800 locomotives.

Improvements over the pre-rebuilt locomotives which were realised in the Class 39-000 include microprocessor control, 26% more maximum continuous tractive effort and 15% more tractive horse-power, and a Knorr-Bremse electronic brake rack (EBR) to replace the old pneumatic braking controls.

== Works numbers ==
The original Classes 34-600, 34-800 and 37-000 numbers and works numbers of the Class 39-000 locomotives are listed in the table.

Class 34-600, 34-800 & 37-000 locomotives rebuilt to Class 39-000
Class 34 or 37-000 No.	Works No.	Class 39-000 No.
34-635	GMSA 101-35	39-001
34-838	GMSA 112-38	39-002
34-674	GMSA 101-74	39-003
34-620	GMSA 101-20	39-004
34-829	GMSA 112-29	39-005
37-010	GMSA 116-10	39-251

== Service ==
The five Class 39-000 locomotives were initially placed in service on the Pretoria-Komatipoort section of the line to Maputo in Mozambique to work in conjunction with Class 37-000 locomotives on the heavy grades of the Belfast-Steelpoort section in Mpumalanga. By 2013, once the Class 39-200 locomotive fleet had also entered service, they were redeployed to the Thabazimbi iron ore line and shedded at Pyramid South.

== Illustration ==
The main picture shows no. 39-002 at Pyramid South, north of Pretoria, as delivered in Transnet Freight Rail livery. Of the five Class 39-000 locomotives, only no. 39-001 was delivered in Spoornet's blue livery with outline numbers.

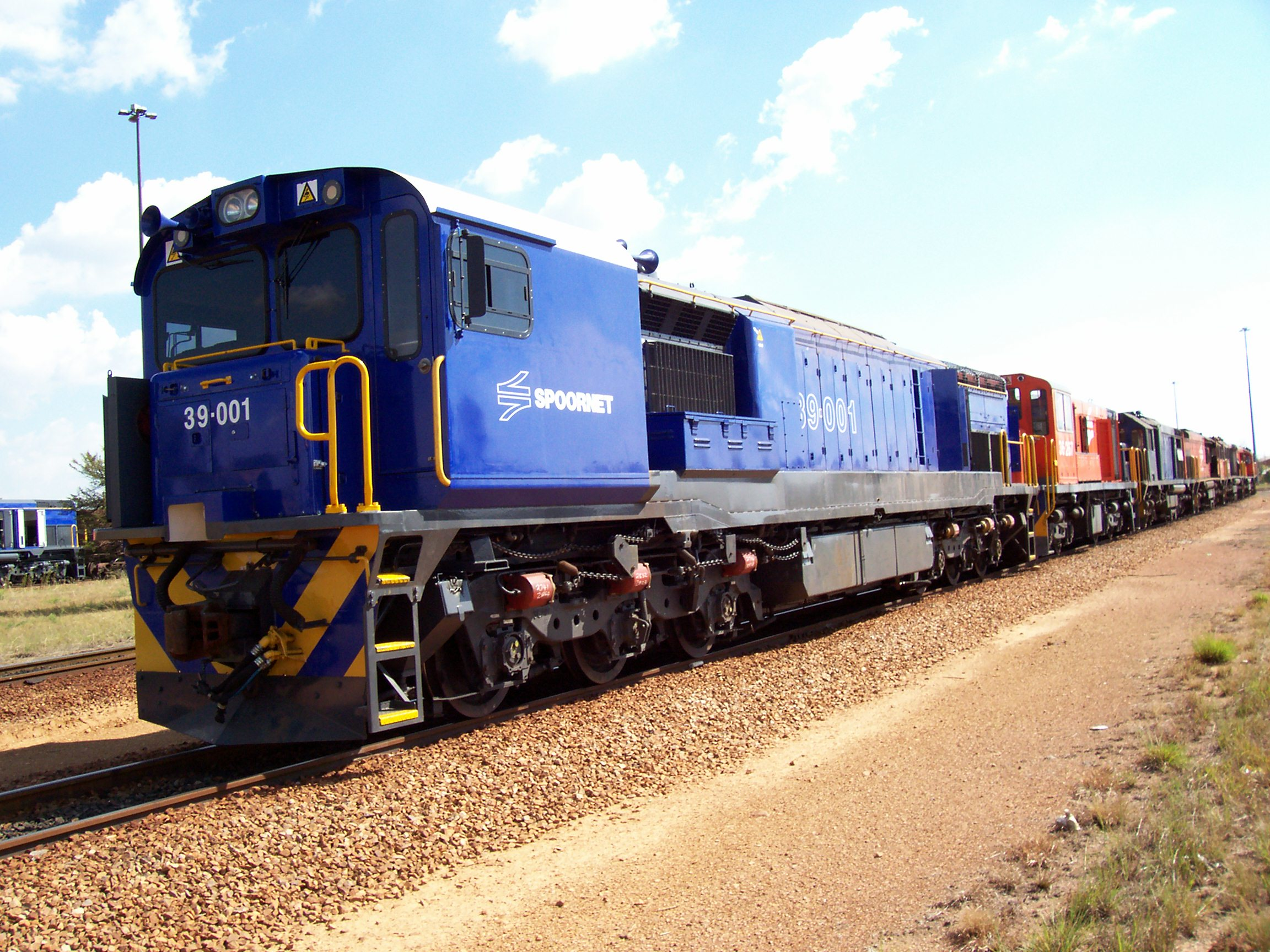
No. 39–001 in Spoornet blue livery with outline numbers, Koedoespoort, Pretoria, Gauteng, 24 April 2007

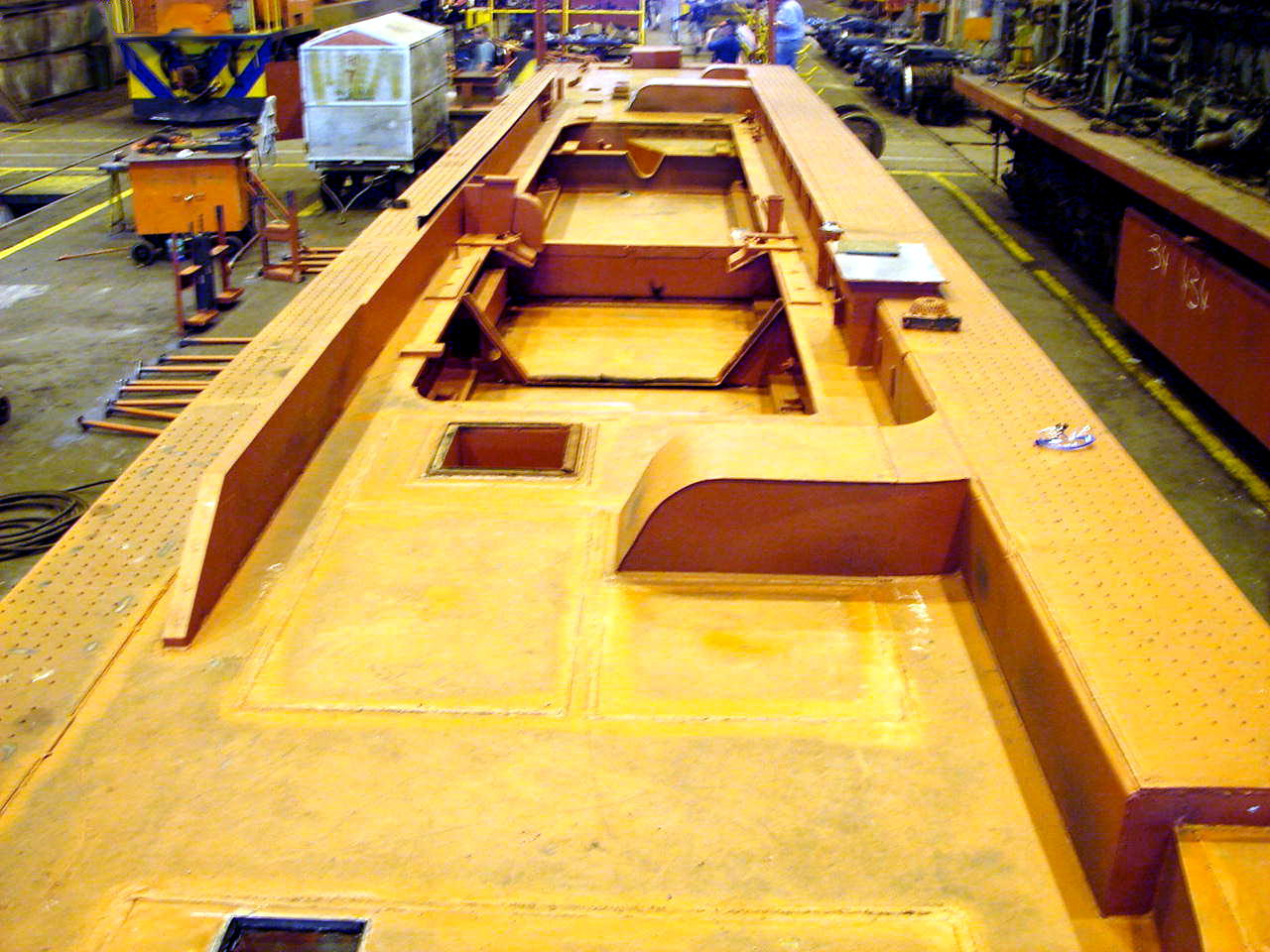
Early construction phase of no. 39-002 photographed from the cab end at Transwerk, Bloemfontein, 7 April 2006

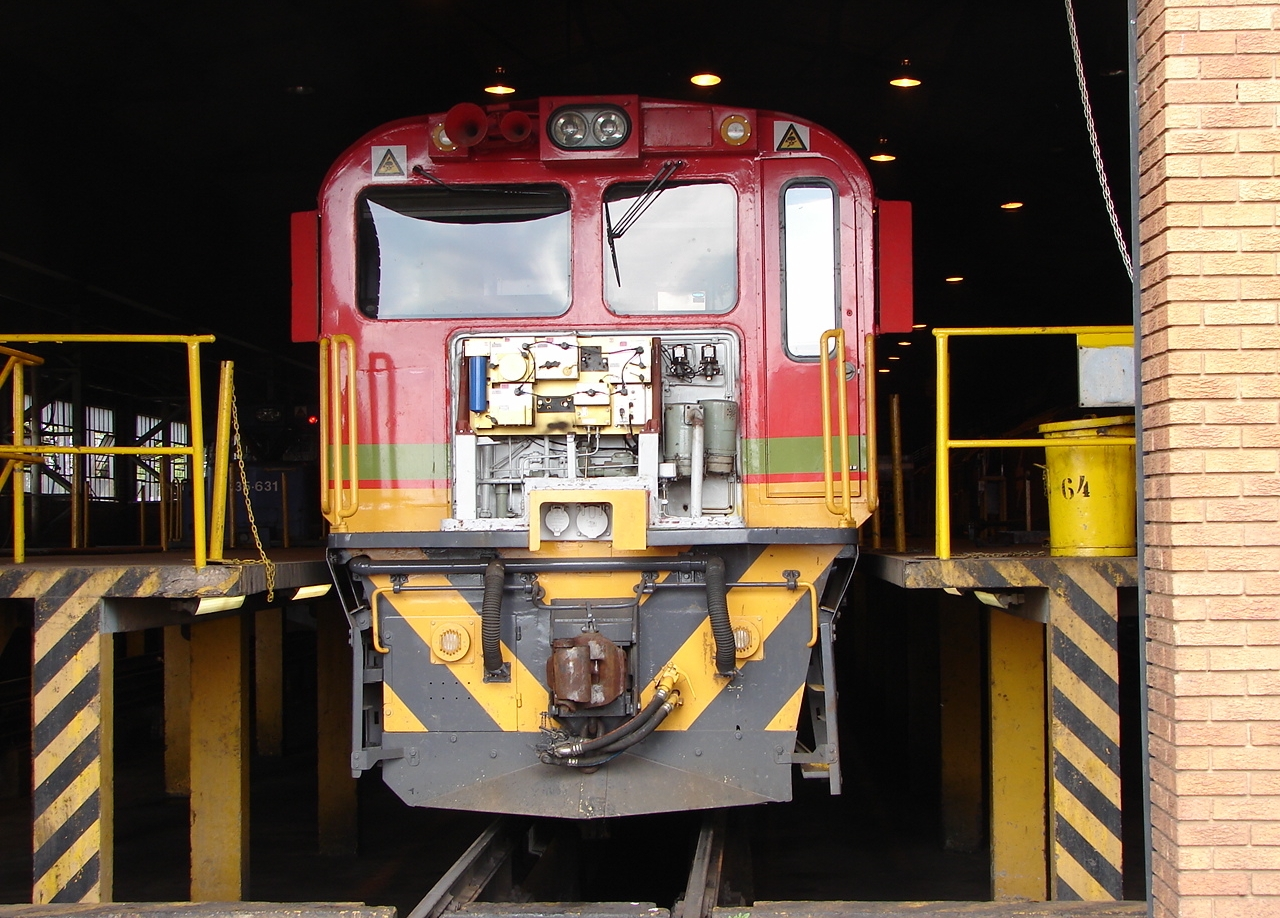
No. 39–005 with the short hood removed at Koedoespoort, Pretoria, Gauteng, 30 September 2009
