= South African Class 34-200 =

Diesel-electric locomotive

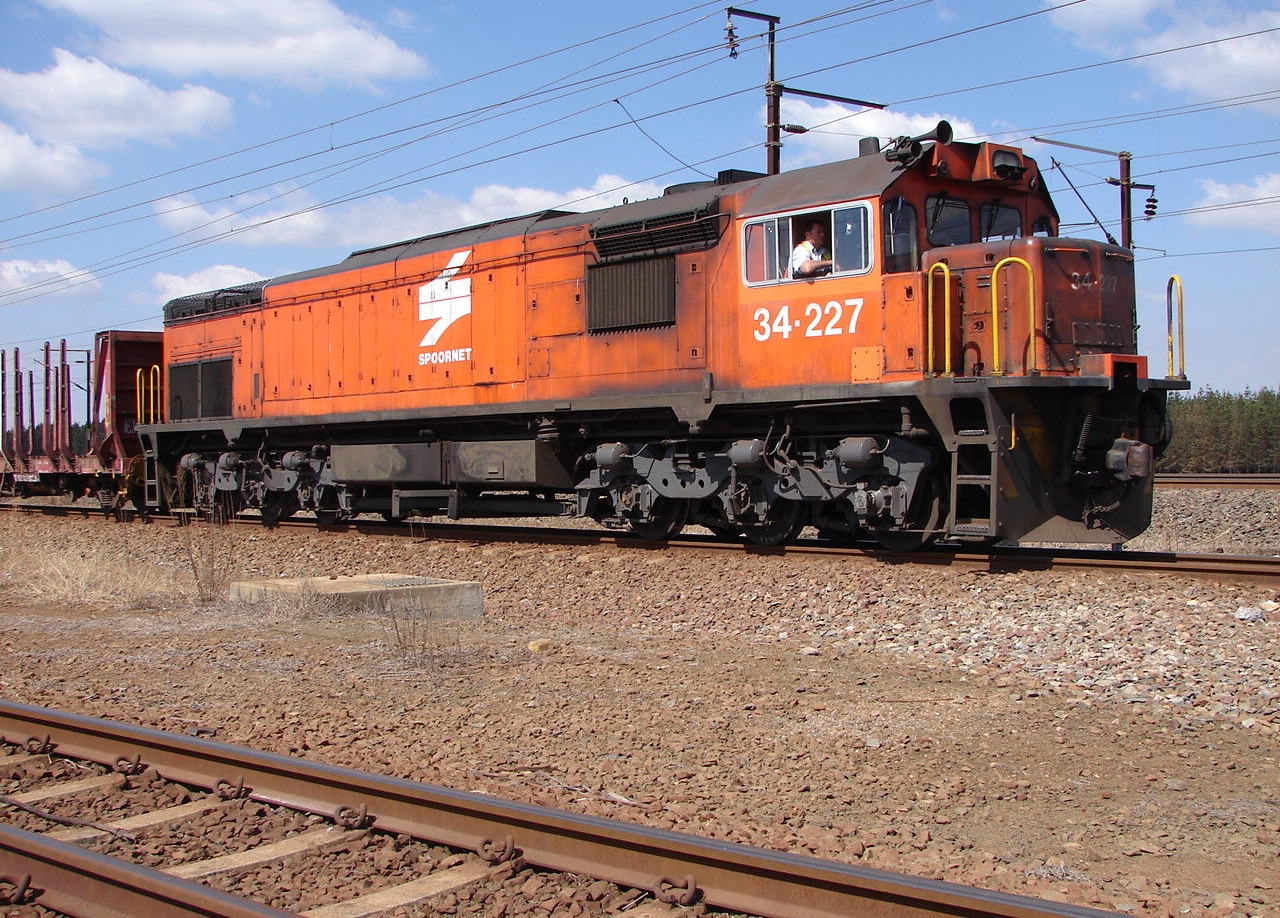
- No. 34-227 at Wildrand siding, near Piet Retief, Mpumalanga, 17 August 2007
Type and origin
- Power type: Diesel Electric
- Designer: General Motors Electro-Motive Division
- Builder: General Motors Electro-Motive Division
- Serial number: 37563-37612
- Model: GM-EMD GT26MC
- Build date: 1971-1972
- Total produced: 50
Specifications
- Configuration
  - AAR: C-C
  - UIC: Co'Co'
  - Commonwealth: Co+Co
- Gauge: 3 ft 6 in (1,067 mm) Cape gauge
- Wheel diameter: 1,016 mm (40.0 in)
- Wheelbase: 14,732 mm (48 ft 4.0 in)
  - Bogie: 3,632 mm (11 ft 11.0 in)
- Pivot centres: 11,278 mm (37 ft 0 in)
- Length
  - Over couplers: 19,202 mm (63 ft 0 in)
- Width: 2,819 mm (9 ft 3.0 in)
- Height: 3,924 mm (12 ft 10.5 in)
- Axle load: 18,850 kg (41,560 lb)
- Adhesive weight: 113,100 kg (249,300 lb)
- Loco weight: 113,100 kg (249,300 lb) max
- Fuel type: Diesel
- Fuel capacity: 6,100 litres (1,300 imp gal)
- Prime mover: GM-EMD 16-645E3
- RPM range: 250-900
  - RPM low idle: 250
  - RPM idle: 315
  - Maximum RPM: 900
- Engine type: 2-stroke diesel
- Aspiration: GM-EMD E16 turbocharger
- Displacement: 10.57 litres (645 cu in)
- Alternator: 10 pole 3 phase GM-EMD AR10F-D14
- Traction motors: Six GM-EMD D29B DC 4 pole
  - Rating 1 hour: 485A
  - Continuous: 450A @ 21 km/h (13 mph)
- Cylinders: V16
- Gear ratio: 63:14
- MU working: 6 maximum
- Loco brake: 28-LAV-1 with vigilance control
- Train brakes: Gardner-Denver ADJV-8101 compressor/exhauster
- Air tank cap.: 850 litres (190 imp gal)
- Compressor: 0.021 m^{3}/s (0.74 cu ft/s) @ 475 rpm
- Exhauster: 0.084 m^{3}/s (3.0 cu ft/s) @ 475 rpm
- Couplers: AAR knuckle type E
Performance figures
- Maximum speed: 100 km/h (62 mph)
- Power output
  - Starting: 2,145 kW (2,876 hp)
  - Continuous: 1,940 kW (2,600 hp)
- Tractive effort
  - Starting: 272 kN (61,000 lbf)
  - Continuous: 218 kN (49,000 lbf) @ 26 km/h (16 mph)
- Factor of adh.
  - Starting: 25%
  - Continuous: 20%
- Brakeforce: 65% ratio @ 345 kPa (50.0 psi)
- Dynamic brake peak effort: 188 kN (42,000 lbf) @ 28 km/h (17 mph)
Career
- Operators: South African Railways; Spoornet; Transnet Freight Rail; NLPI; Sheltam
- Class: Class 34-200
- Number in class: 50
- Numbers: 34-201 to 34-250
- Delivered: 1971-1972
- First run: 1971

The South African Railways Class 34-200 of 1971 is a diesel-electric locomotive.

Between October 1971 and March 1972, the South African Railways placed fifty Class 34-200 General Motors Electro-Motive Division type GT26MC diesel-electric locomotives in service.

== Manufacturer ==
The Class 34-200 type GT26MC diesel-electric locomotive was designed and built for the South African Railways (SAR) by General Motors Electro-Motive Division (GM-EMD) at their McCook plant in Illinois. Fifty locomotives were delivered between October 1971 and March 1972, numbered in the range from 34-201 to 34-250.

== Class 34 series ==
=== GE and GM-EMD designs ===
The Class 34 locomotive family consists of seven series, the General Electric (GE) Classes 34-000, 34-400, 34-500 (also known as 34-400 ex Iscor) and 34-900, and the GM-EMD Classes 34-200, 34-600 and 34-800. Both manufacturers also produced locomotives for the South African Classes 33, 35 and 36.

=== Distinguishing features ===
Of the GM-EMD Class 34 series locomotives, Classes 34-200 and 34-600 units are visually indistinguishable from one another, but they can be distinguished from the Class 34-800 by the thicker fishbelly-shaped sills on their left hand sides compared to the straight sill on the left hand side of the Class 34-800.

== Service ==
=== South Africa ===
The Class 34-200 were mostly destined for use in the Cape Midlands, but was imported through Durban harbour since Port Elizabeth harbour did not have facilities to handle these large mainline diesel-electrics. The locomotives arrived fully assembled and were hauled inland from Durban Harbour in blocks of 16 to 18 units, each worked by four new Class 6E1 units. Reports at the time indicated that the locomotives would be worked directly to the Cape Midlands via Bethlehem, Kroonstad and Bloemfontein to Port Elizabeth. Since at least one of these loads was photographed between Germiston and Pretoria, it is more likely that they first went to Koedoespoort in Pretoria for commissioning before being released for service on the Cape Midlands.

The Class 34-200s eventually worked on most mainlines and some unelectrified branch lines in the central, eastern, northern and northeastern parts of South Africa. By the 2010s a significant number of them were observed at Richards Bay, Empangeni, Vryheid and Ermelo.

=== NLPI Ltd. ===
NLPI Limited (abbreviated from New Limpopo Projects Investments), a Mauritius-registered company, specialises in private sector investments by using the build-operate-transfer (BOT) concept. It had three connected railway operations in Zimbabwe and Zambia, which formed a rail link between South Africa and the Democratic Republic of Congo.

- The Beitbridge Bulawayo Railway (BBR), commissioned on 1 September 1999, operates the Beit Bridge to Bulawayo line in Zimbabwe.
- From February 2004, NLPI Logistics (NLL or LOG) operated between Bulawayo and Victoria Falls on the Zimbabwe-Zambia border.
- From February 2003, the Railway Systems of Zambia (RSZ) operated on the former Zambian Railways (ZR) from Victoria Falls to Sakania in the Congo.

In Zambia, the RSZ locomotive fleet included former ZR locomotives, but the rest of the locomotive fleet of all three operations consisted of South African GM-EMD Classes 34-200, 34-600 and 34-800 and GE Classes 35-000 and 35-400 locomotives. These locomotives were sometimes marked or branded as either BBR or LOG or both, but their status, whether leased or loaned, was unclear since they were still on the TFR roster and still often worked in South Africa as well.

Zambia Railways, the state-owned holding company, resumed control of the Zambian national rail network on 11 September 2012. This followed the Zambian government's decision to revoke the operating concession which had been awarded to RSZ after Finance Minister Alexander Chikwanda claimed that RSZ had "blatantly disregarded the provisions of the agreement" and had been "acting in a manner prejudicial to the interests of Zambians".

=== Sheltam ===
One of the Class 34-200 locomotives, no. 34-221, was sold to Sheltam where it became their no. 4, having since been renumbered to 2601. Sheltam is a locomotive hire and repair company which undertakes complete operating contracts and maintenance contracts, based at the Douglas Colliery near Witbank in Mpumalanga. By the turn of the millennium, Sheltam locomotives were operating at Randfontein Estates Gold Mine in Gauteng, in Mpumalanga at Douglas and Vandyksdrift Collieries and at SAPPI, Ngodwana. They also operated on Spoornet's Newcastle-Utrecht branch in KwaZulu-Natal and for a while on Kei Rail in the Eastern Cape. Outside South Africa, they operate on the BBR, NLL and RSZ lines through Zimbabwe and Zambia and in the Congo.

== Works numbers ==
The Class 34-200 builder's works numbers and known deployment are listed in the table.

Class 34-200, GM-EMD type GT26MC
Loco no.	GM-EMD works no.	Leased or Sold to
34-201	37563	
34-202	37564	
34-203	37565	
34-204	37566	
34-205	37567	
34-206	37568	
34-207	37569	
34-208	37570	
34-209	37571	NLPI
34-210	37572	
34-211	37573	
34-212	37574	NLPI
34-213	37575	
34-214	37576	NLPI
34-215	37577	
34-216	37578	
34-217	37579	
34-218	37580	
34-219	37581	
34-220	37582	
34-221	37583	Sheltam 4/2601
34-222	37584	
34-223	37585	
34-224	37586	
34-225	37587	
34-226	37588	
34-227	37589	
34-228	37590	
34-229	37591	
34-230	37592	
34-231	37593	
34-232	37594	
34-233	37595	
34-234	37596	
34-235	37597	
34-236	37598	
34-237	37599	
34-238	37600	NLPI
34-239	37601	
34-240	37602	NLPI
34-241	37603	
34-242	37604	NLPI
34-243	37605	
34-244	37606	NLPI
34-245	37607	NLPI
34-246	37608	NLPI
34-247	37609	NLPI
34-248	37610	NLPI
34-249	37611	
34-250	37612	

== Liveries ==
The Class 34-200 were all delivered in the SAR Gulf Red livery with signal red buffer beams, yellow side stripes on the long hood sides and a yellow V on each end. In the 1990s they began to be repainted in the Spoornet orange livery with a yellow and blue chevron pattern on the buffer beams.

== Illustration ==
The main picture shows the right hand side of no. 34-227 in the Spoornet orange livery. The left side and the NLPI LOG livery as applied to Class 34-200 locomotives are illustrated below.

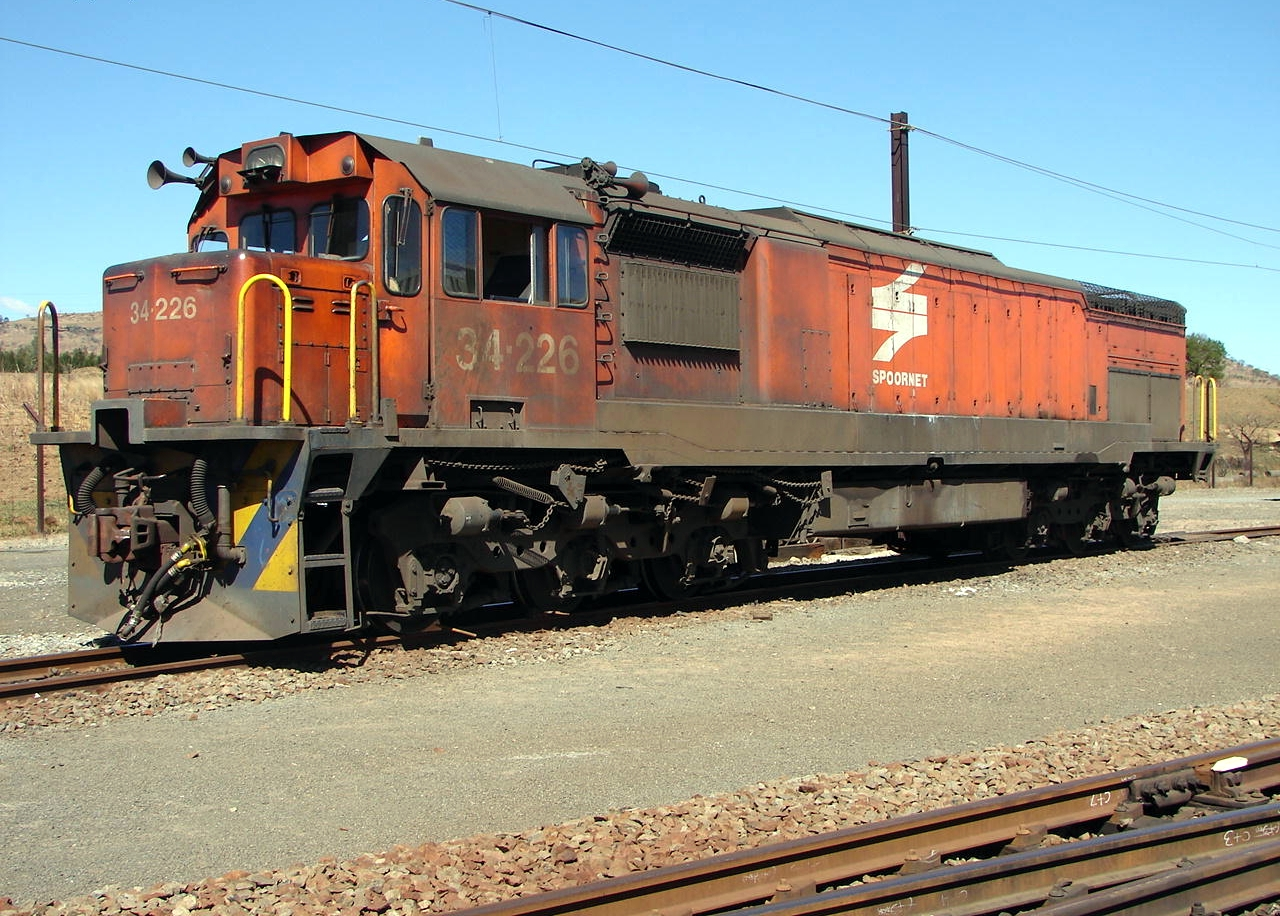
No. 34–226 in Spoornet orange livery at Vryheid yard, KwaZulu-Natal, 16 August 2007

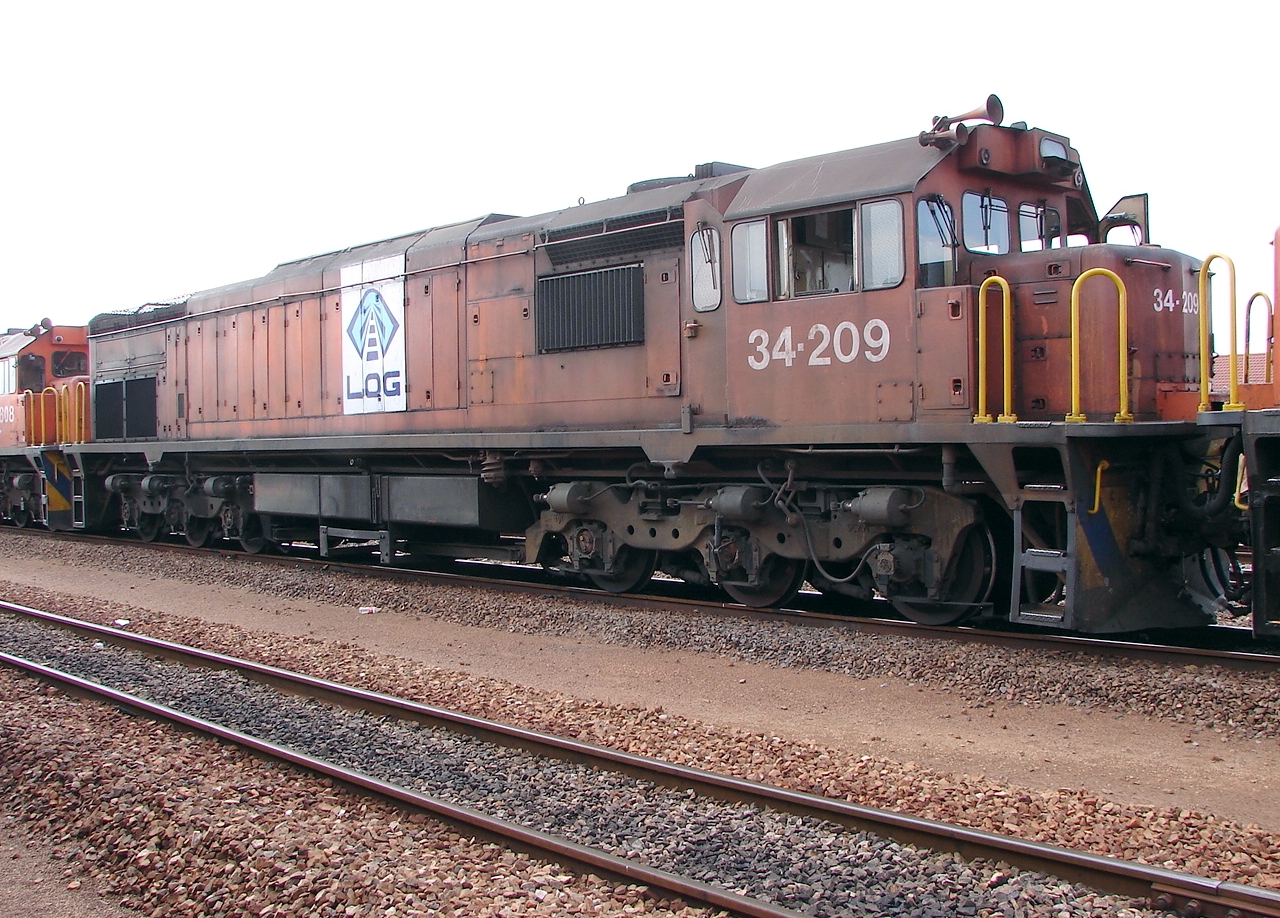
No. 34–209 with NLPI LOG emblems at Koedoespoort, Pretoria, 30 September 2009
