= Sheltam =

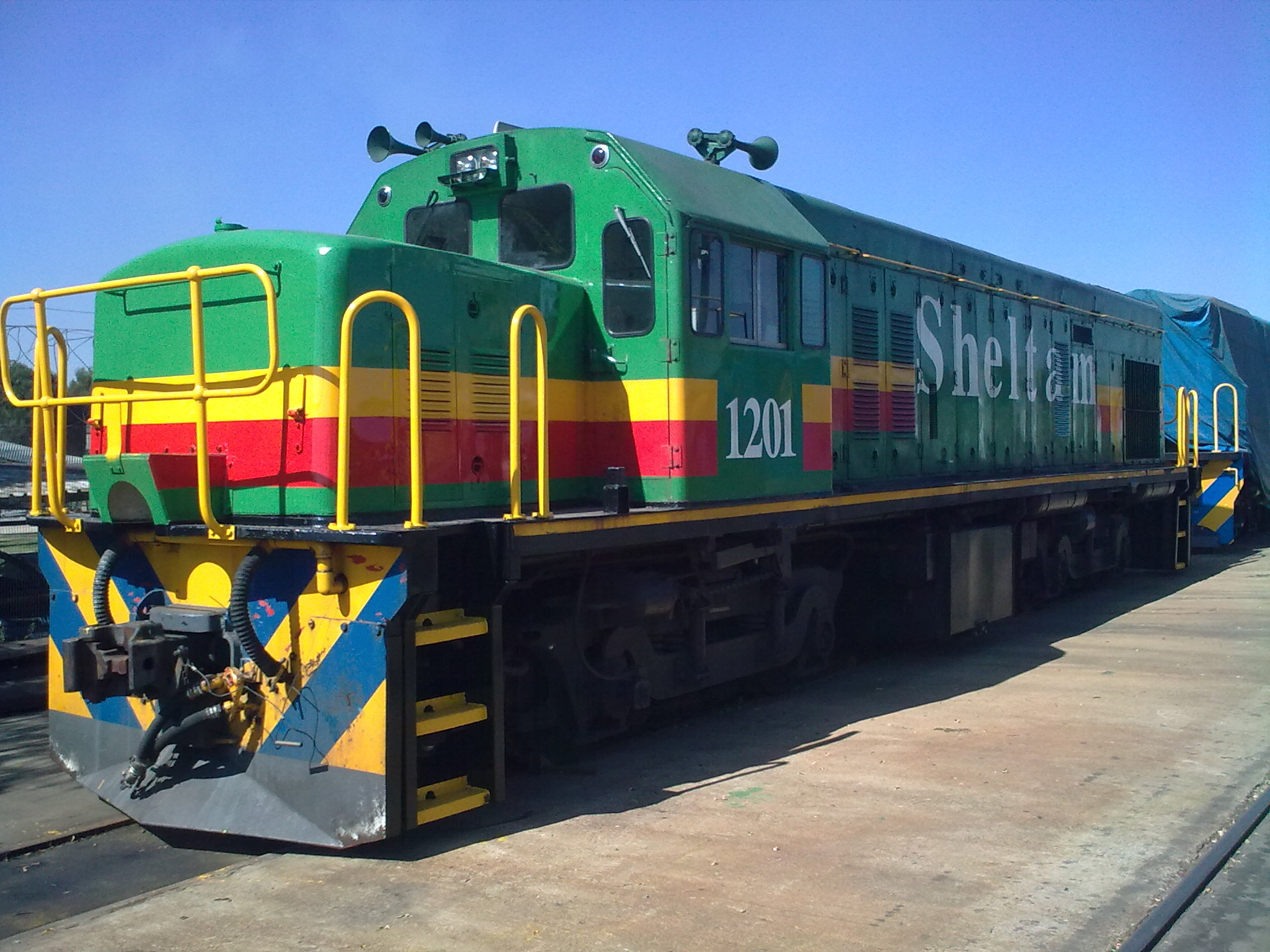
Ex-SAR 31-005 locomotive in Sheltam Livery

Sheltam is a locomotive hire and repair company that undertakes complete operating contracts and maintenance contracts, based in Gqeberha, South Africa. By the year 2000, Sheltam locomotives were operating at Randfontein Estates Gold Mine in Gauteng, and in Mpumalanga at Douglas and Vandyksdrift Collieries and at SAPPI, Ngodwana. They also operated on Spoornet’s Newcastle-Utrecht branch in KwaZulu-Natal and on Kei Rail in the Eastern Cape. Outside South Africa they operate on the Beitbridge Bulawayo Railway (BBR), NLL and Railway Systems of Zambia (RSZ) lines through Zimbabwe and Zambia and in the Democratic Republic of the Congo.

== Locomotives ==
Locomotives owned or operated by Sheltam include:

- Ex-South African Class 31-000
- Ex-South African Class 33-200
- Ex-South African Class 34-200
