= South African Class 34-800 =

Type of diesel-electric locomotive

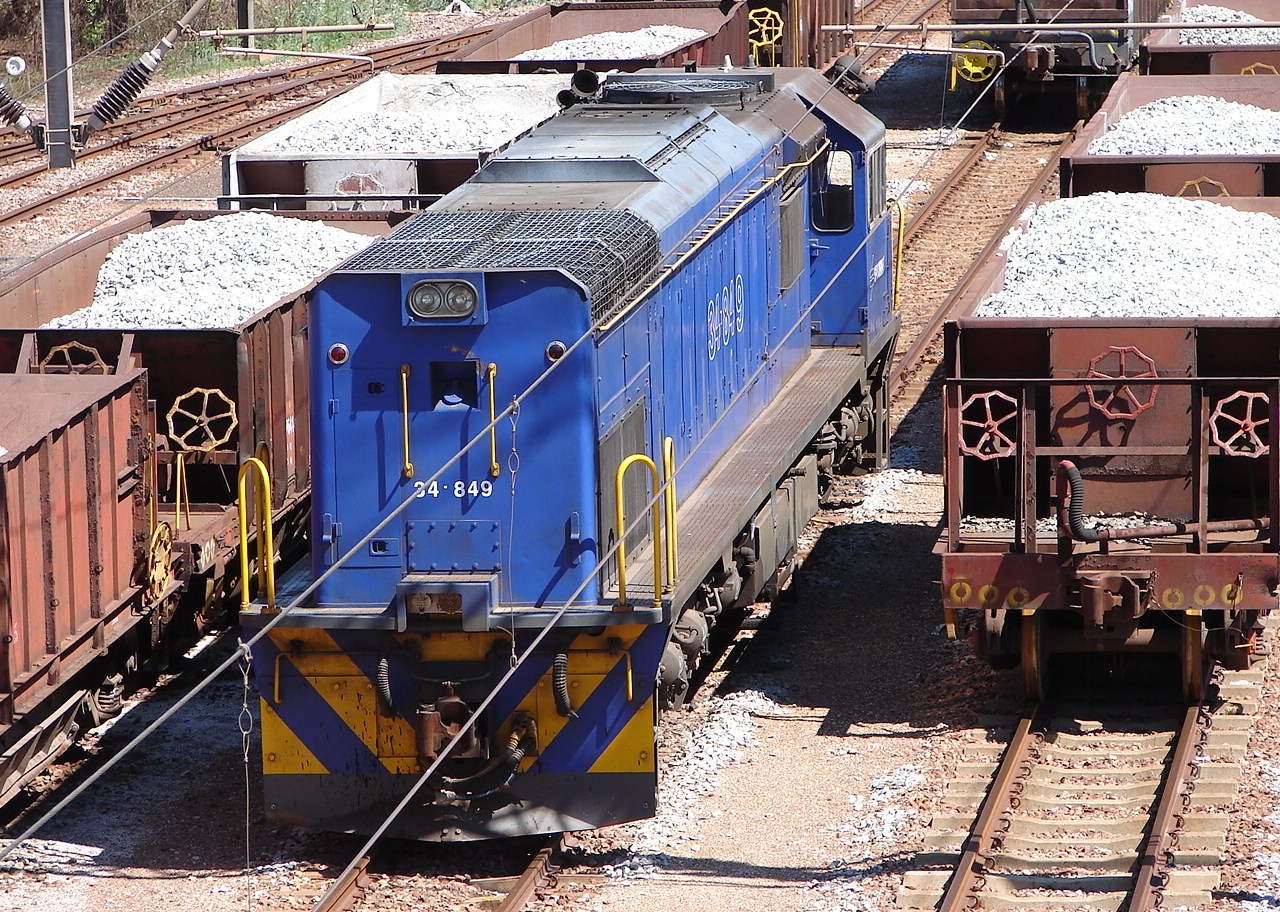
- No. 34-849 at Rust de Winter, Limpopo, 6 October 2009
Type and origin
- ♠ – Original locomotive, as built ♥ – Locomotive with upgraded traction motors
- Power type: Diesel-electric
- Designer: General Motors Electro-Motive Division
- Builder: General Motors South Africa
- Serial number: 112-1 to 112-50, 113-1 to 113-8, 114-1
- Model: GM-EMD GT26MC
- Build date: 1978–1980
- Total produced: 59
- Rebuilder: Transnet Rail Engineering
- Rebuild date: 2006–2008
- Number rebuilt: 2 to Class 39-000
Specifications
- Configuration
  - AAR: C-C
  - UIC: Co'Co'
  - Commonwealth: Co+Co
- Gauge: 3 ft 6 in (1,067 mm) Cape gauge
- Wheel diameter: 1,016 mm (40.0 in)
- Wheelbase: 14,732 mm (48 ft 4.0 in)
  - Bogie: 3,632 mm (11 ft 11.0 in)
- Pivot centres: 11,278 mm (37 ft 0 in)
- Length
  - Over couplers: 19,202 mm (63 ft 0 in)
- Width: 2,819 mm (9 ft 3.0 in)
- Height: 3,924 mm (12 ft 10.5 in)
- Axle load: 18,850 kg (41,560 lb)
- Adhesive weight: 113,100 kg (249,300 lb)
- Loco weight: 113,100 kg (249,300 lb) max
- Fuel type: Diesel
- Fuel capacity: 6,100 litres (1,300 imp gal)
- Prime mover: GM-EMD 16-645E3
- RPM range: 250–900
  - RPM low idle: 250
  - RPM idle: 315
  - Maximum RPM: 900
- Engine type: 2-stroke diesel
- Aspiration: GM-EMD E16 turbocharger
- Displacement: 10.57 litres (645.0 cu in)
- Alternator: 10 pole 3 phase GM-EMD AR10F-D14
- Traction motors: ♠ Six GM-EMD D29B DC 4 pole ♥ Six GM-EMD D31 DC 4 pole
  - Rating 1 hour: ♠ 485A ♥ 545A
  - Continuous: ♠ 450A @ 21 km/h (13 mph) ♥ 520A @ 21 km/h (13 mph)
- Cylinders: V16
- Gear ratio: 63:14
- MU working: 6 maximum
- Loco brake: 28-LAV-1 with vigilance control
- Train brakes: Gardner-Denver ADJV-8401 compressor/exhauster
- Air tank cap.: 850 litres (190 imp gal)
- Compressor: 0.021 m^{3}/s (0.74 cu ft/s)
- Exhauster: 0.095 m^{3}/s (3.4 cu ft/s)
- Couplers: AAR knuckle
Performance figures
- Maximum speed: 100 km/h (62 mph)
- Power output
  - Starting: ♠ 2,145 kW (2,876 hp) ♥ 2,342 kW (3,141 hp)
  - Continuous: ♠ 1,940 kW (2,600 hp) ♥ 2,171 kW (2,911 hp)
- Tractive effort
  - Starting: ♠ 272 kN (61,000 lbf) ♥ 306 kN (69,000 lbf)
  - Continuous: ♠ 218 kN (49,000 lbf) @ 26 km/h (16 mph) ♥ 245 kN (55,000 lbf) @ 26 km/h (16 mph)
- Factor of adh.
  - Starting: 25%
  - Continuous: 20%
- Brakeforce: 60% ratio @ 340 kPa (49 psi)
- Dynamic brake peak effort: 188 kN (42,000 lbf) @ 28 km/h (17 mph)
Career
- Operators: South African Railways; Spoornet; Transnet Freight Rail; NRZ; NLPI; Iscor
- Class: Class 34-800
- Number in class: 59
- Numbers: SAR 34-801 to 34-858; Iscor 666-0090
- Delivered: 1978–1980
- First run: 1978

The South African Railways Class 34-800 of 1978 is a diesel-electric locomotive.

Between August 1978 and December 1979, the South African Railways placed fifty Class 34-800 General Motors Electro-Motive Division type GT26MC diesel-electric locomotives in service. In 1979 one more of the same type was placed in service by Iscor in Newcastle and between April and July 1980 a further eight of these locomotives were delivered to the South African Railways.

== Manufacturer ==
The Class 34-800 type GT26MC diesel-electric locomotive was designed by General Motors Electro-Motive Division and built for the South African Railways (SAR) and Iscor by General Motors South Africa (GMSA) in Port Elizabeth. The first fifty were delivered between August 1978 and December 1979, numbered in the range from 34-801 to 34-850. In 1979, one more of the same type was placed in service by Iscor. Between April and July 1980, a further eight of these locomotives were delivered to the South African Railways, numbered in the range from 34-851 to 34-858.

== Distinguishing features ==
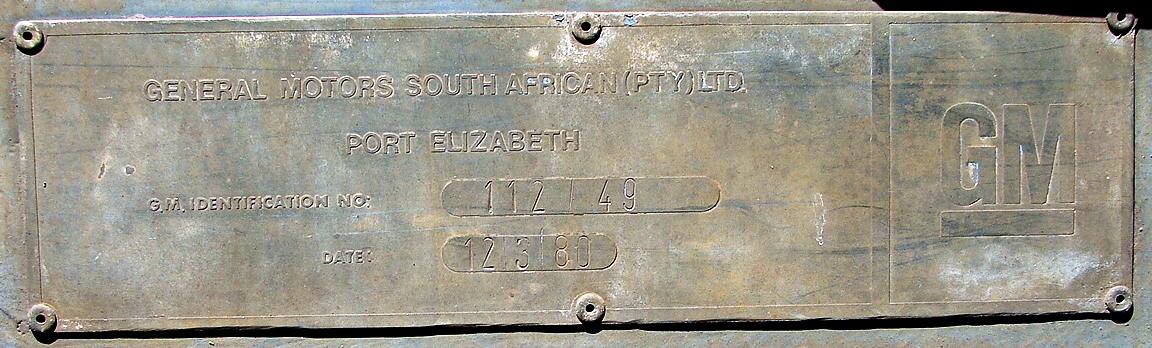
GMSA works plate on no. 34-849

Of the GM-EMD Class 34 family of locomotives, Classes 34-200 and 34-600 locomotives are visually indistinguishable from one another, but they can be distinguished from the Class 34-800 by the thicker fishbelly-shaped sills on their left sides compared to the straight sill on the left side of the Class 34-800.

== Rebuilding and modification ==
=== Class 39-000 ===
The Class 39-000 type GT26CU-3 diesel-electric locomotives were to be rebuilt from Class 34-600, 34-800 and 37-000 locomotives. The project commenced in 2005, using suitable frames from wrecked locomotives.

Rebuilding was done at the Transwerk shops in Bloemfontein between 2006 and 2008. It was intended to produce one hundred Class 39-000s but in spite of the technical success of the project, rebuilding was halted after completing the first five locomotives due to higher than anticipated cost. Two of these five were rebuilt from Class 34-800 locomotives. It was decided, instead of rebuilding old locomotives, to rather build fifty new Class 39-200 locomotives from imported and locally produced components.

=== Traction motor upgrade ===
In 2010, a project commenced at the Koedoespoort Transnet Rail Engineering shops to upgrade Class 34-800 locomotives by, amongst other modifications, replacing the GM-EMD D29B with GM-EMD D31 traction motors, thereby improving their performance to the standard of the Class 37-000. The upgraded locomotives could initially be distinguished by the running board mounted handrails which were installed on the right side only during the upgrade.

== Service ==
=== South African Railways ===
In SAR, Spoornet and Transnet Freight Rail (TFR) service, the Class 34-800s worked on most mainlines and some unelectrified branchlines in the central, eastern, northern and northeastern parts of the country.

=== National Railways of Zimbabwe ===
From at least 1988 until at least 1992, the National Railways of Zimbabwe (NRZ) hired type GT26MC Class 34-600 locomotives from the SAR and later Spoornet. At least one Class 34-800 locomotive, no. 34-820, also served on lease in Zimbabwe and was observed there in September 1992.

=== NLPI Limited ===
NLPI Limited, abbreviated from New Limpopo Projects Investments, a Mauritius-registered company, specialises in private sector investments by using the build-operate-transfer (BOT) concept. It had three connected railway operations in Zimbabwe and Zambia, which formed a rail link between South Africa and the Democratic Republic of Congo.

- The Beitbridge Bulawayo Railway (BBR), commissioned on 1 September 1999, operates the Beit Bridge to Bulawayo line in Zimbabwe.
- Since February 2004 NLPI Logistics (NLL or LOG) operates between Bulawayo and Victoria Falls on the Zimbabwe-Zambia border.
- Since February 2003 the Railway Systems of Zambia (RSZ) operated on the former Zambian Railways (ZR) from Victoria Falls to Sakania in the Congo.

In Zambia, the RSZ locomotive fleet included former ZR locomotives, but the rest of the locomotive fleet of all three operations consisted of South African GM-EMD Classes 34-200, 34-600 and 34-800 and GE Classes 35-000 and 35-400 locomotives from Spoornet and later TFR. These locomotives were sometimes marked or branded as either BBR or LOG or both, but their status, whether leased or loaned, was unclear since they were still on the TFR roster and still often worked in South Africa as well. Class 34-800 locomotives which served with NLPI include the locomotives annotated "NLPI" in the "disposition" column in the table below.

Zambia Railways, the state-owned holding company, resumed control of the Zambian national rail network on 11 September 2012. This followed the government's decision to revoke the operating concession awarded to RSZ after Finance Minister Alexander Chikwanda claimed that RSZ had "blatantly disregarded the provisions of the agreement" and had been "acting in a manner prejudicial to the interests of Zambians".

=== Iscor ===
In 1979, one Class 34-800 locomotive was delivered new to Iscor's Newcastle steel works in Natal, numbered 666-0090.

== Works numbers ==
The works numbers of the Class 34-800 as well as their known disposal and deployment are displayed in the table.

Class 34-800, GM-EMD type GT26MC
Loco no.	GMSA works no.	Disposition	New no.
34-801	112-1		
34-802	112-2		
34-803	112-3		
34-804	112-4		
34-805	112-5		
34-806	112-6		
34-807	112-7		
34-808	112-8		
34-809	112-9		
34-810	112-10		
34-811	112-11		
34-812	112-12		
34-813	112-13		
34-814	112-14		
34-815	112-15	D31 tr. motors	
34-816	112-16		
34-817	112-17		
34-818	112-18	NLPI	
34-819	112-19	NLPI/D31 tr. motors	
34-820	112-20	NRZ (1992)	
34-821	112-21	D31 tr. motors	
34-822	112-22		
34-823	112-23		
34-824	112-24		
34-825	112-25		
34-826	112-26		
34-827	112-27		
34-828	112-28		
34-829	112-29	Class 39-000	39-005
34-830	112-30		
34-831	112-31		
34-832	112-32		
34-833	112-33		
34-834	112-34	NLPI/D31 tr. motors	
34-835	112-35	NLPI	
34-836	112-36		
34-837	112-37		
34-838	112-38	Class 39-000	39-002
34-839	112-39	D31 tr. motors	
34-840	112-40		
34-841	112-41		
34-842	112-42		
34-843	112-43		
34-844	112-44		
34-845	112-45		
34-846	112-46		
34-847	112-47		
34-848	112-48		
34-849	112-49	D31 tr. motors	
34-850	112-50		
34-851	113-1		
34-852	113-2		
34-853	113-3		
34-854	113-4		
34-855	113-5	D31 tr. motors	
34-856	113-6		
34-857	113-7		
34-858	113-8	D31 tr. motors	
666-0090	114-1	Iscor	

== Liveries ==
The Class 34-800 were all delivered in the SAR Gulf Red livery with signal red buffer beams, yellow side stripes on the long hood sides and a yellow V on each end. In the 1990s many of them began to be repainted in the Spoornet orange livery with a yellow and blue chevron pattern on the buffer beams. Some later received the Spoornet Traction maroon livery. In the late 1990s a few were repainted in the Spoornet blue livery with outline numbers on the long hood sides. After 2008 in the Passenger Rail Agency of South Africa (PRASA) era, at least one was repainted in the PRASA blue livery.

== Illustration ==
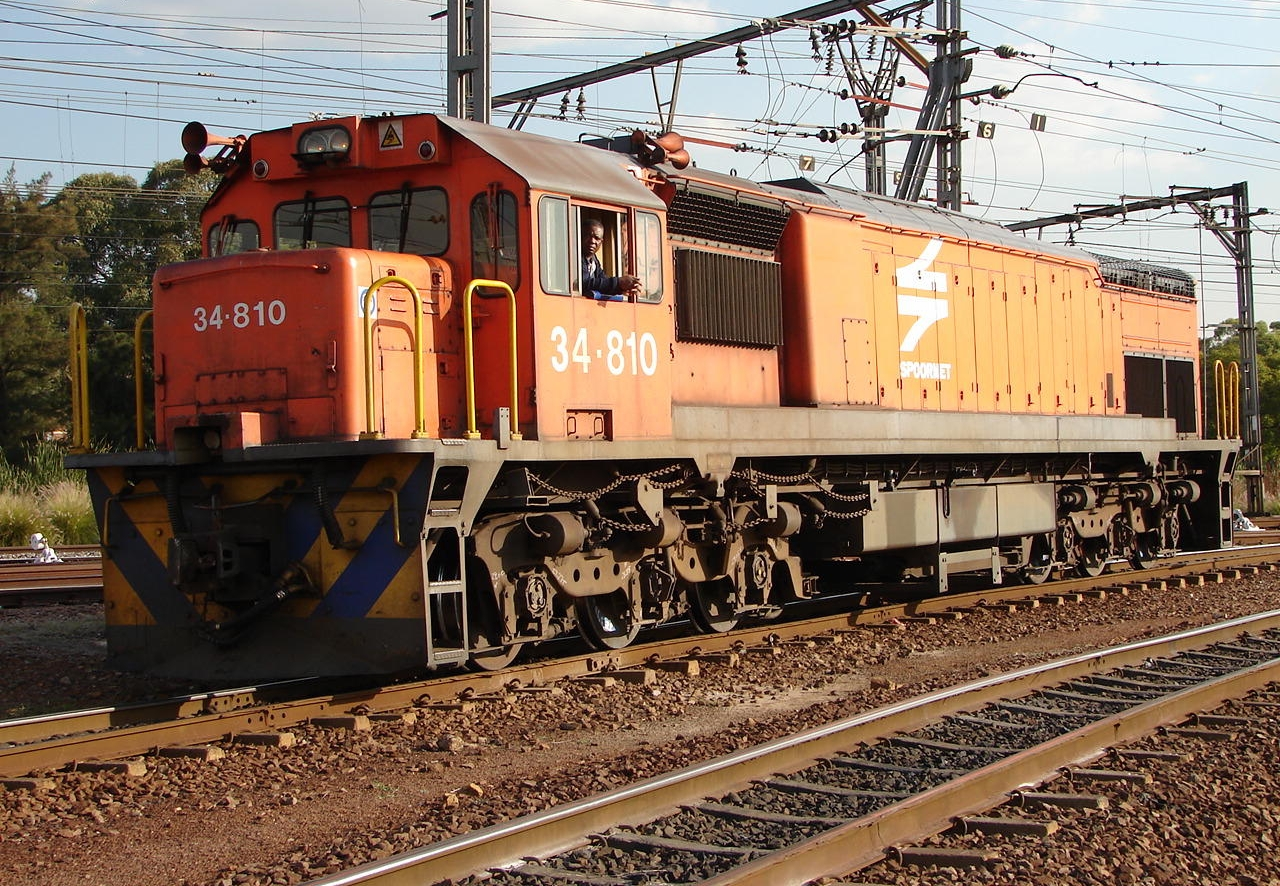
No. 34-810 in the Spoornet orange livery at Capital Park yard, Pretoria, Gauteng, 9 May 2006

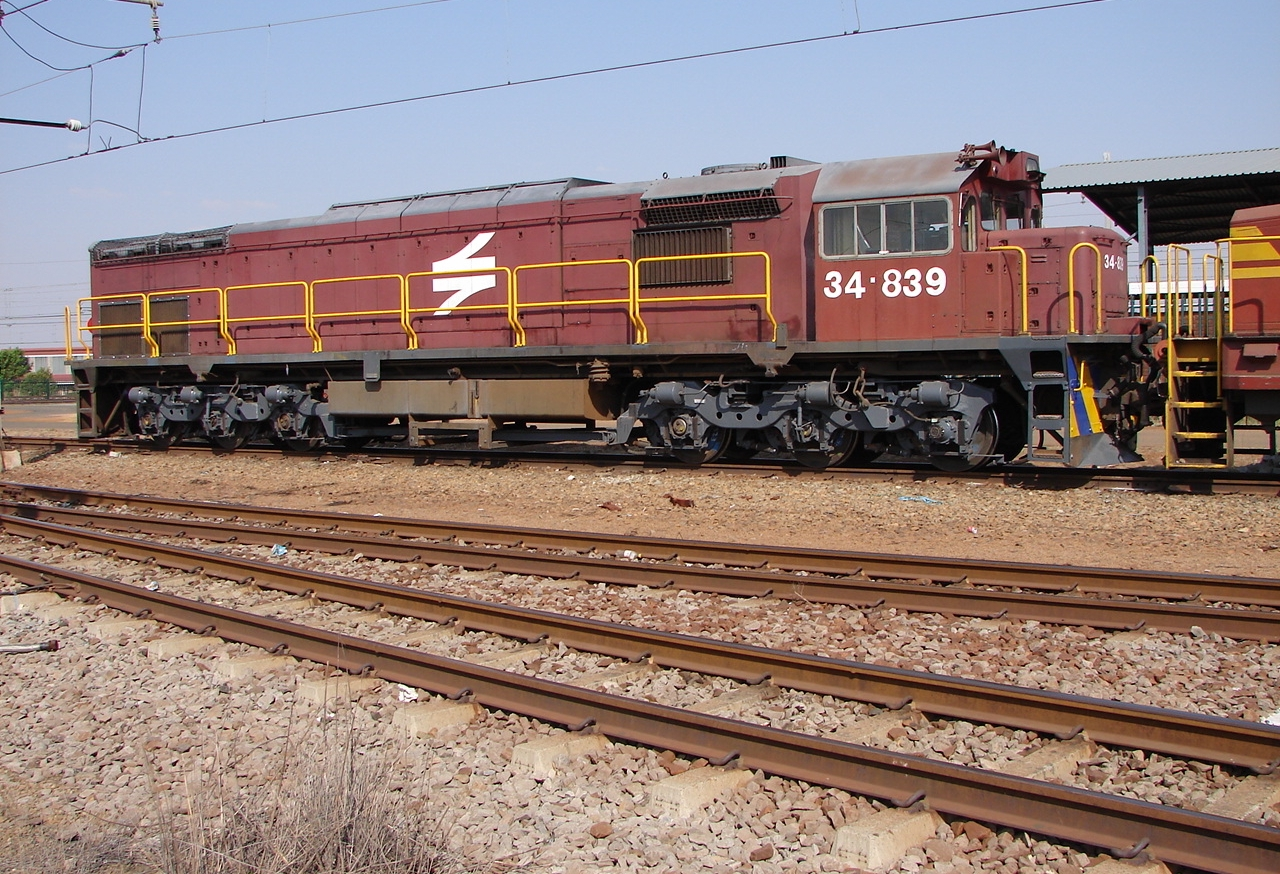
Upgraded no. 34-839 in Spoornet maroon livery at Sentrarand, Gauteng, 22 September 2009

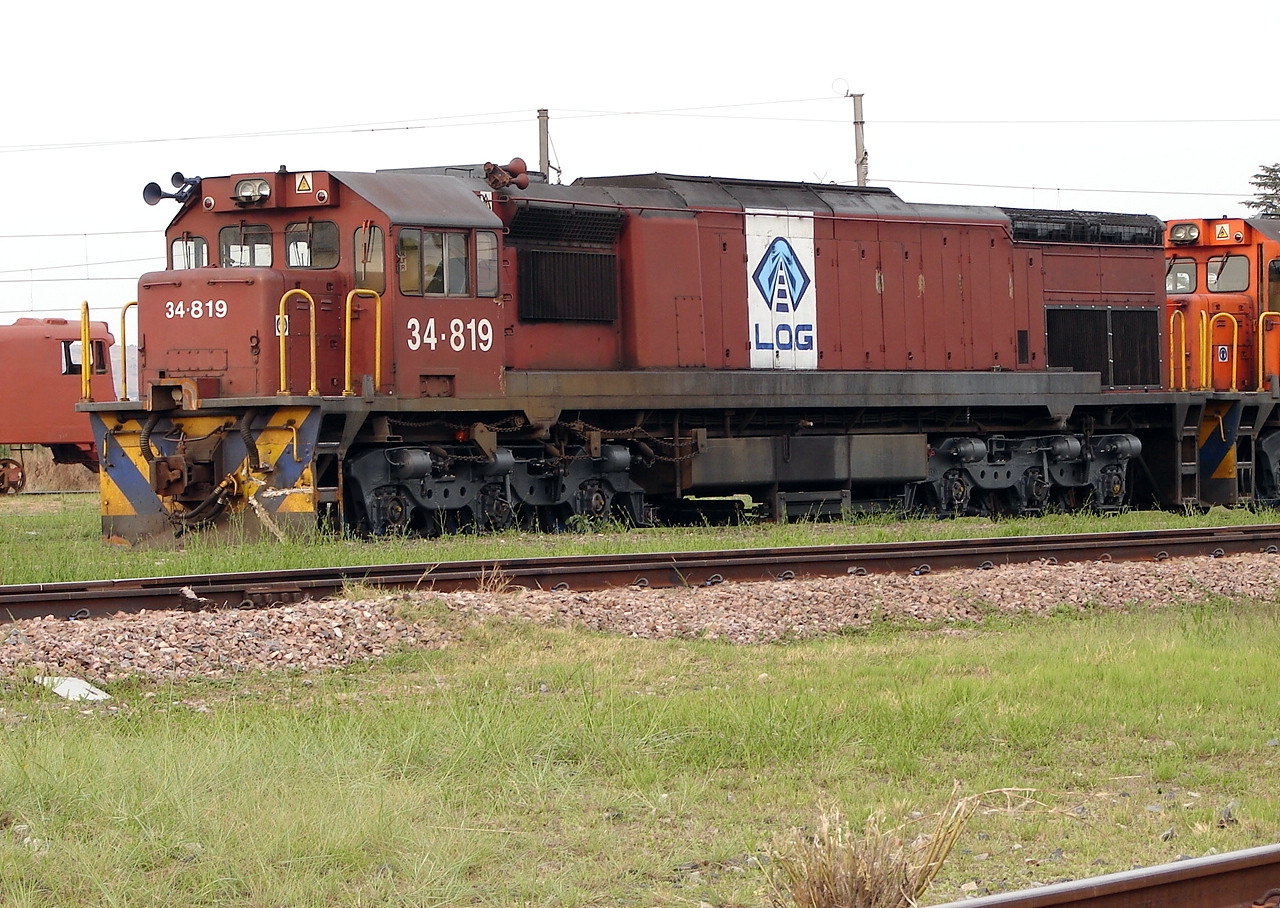
No. 34-819 in Spoornet maroon with NLPI Logistics emblems at Koedoespoort, 2 October 2009

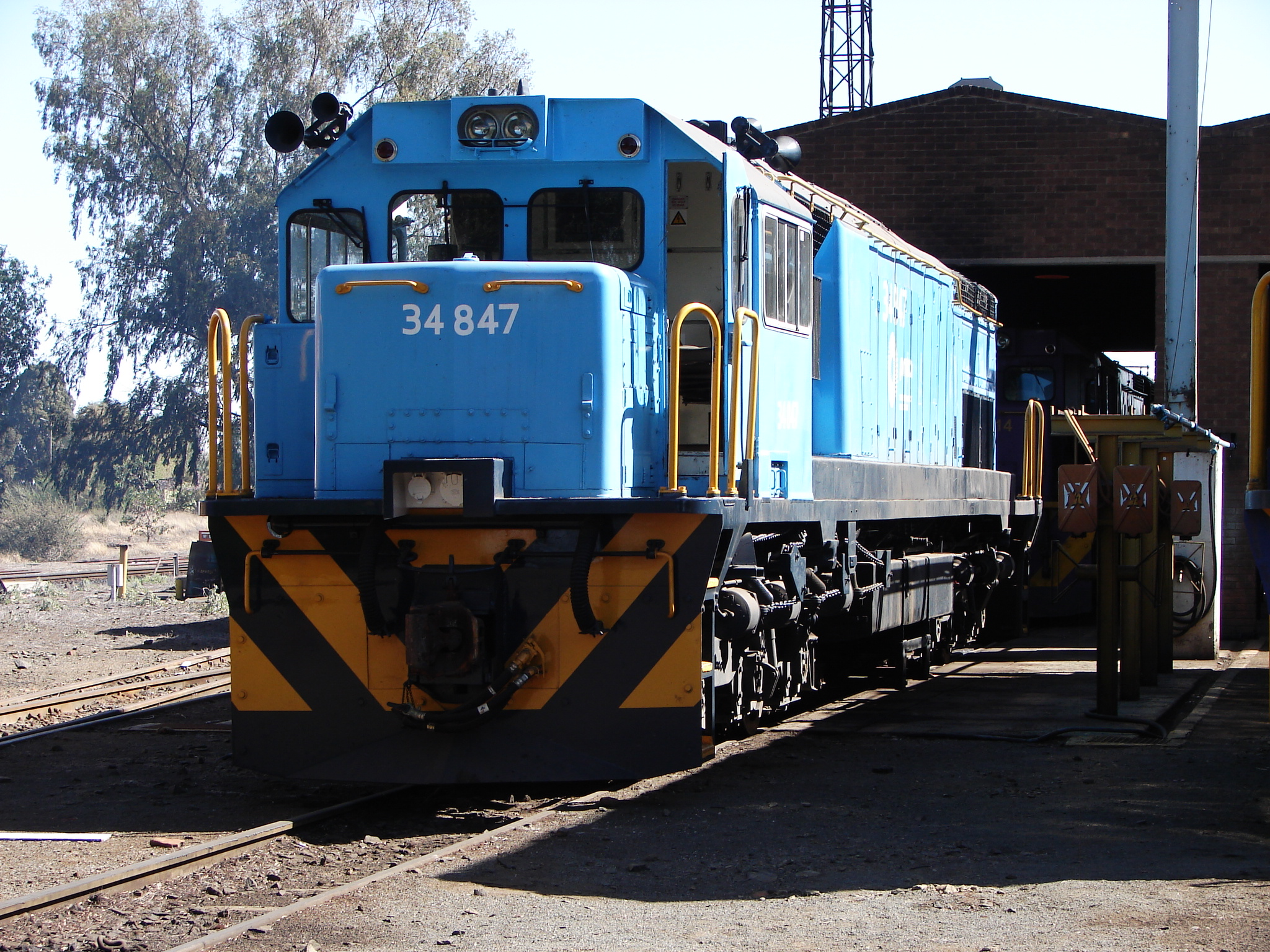
No. 34-847 in PRASA's backdrop blue livery, Bloemfontein, 18 September 2015
