= Beitbridge Bulawayo Railway =

Railway company

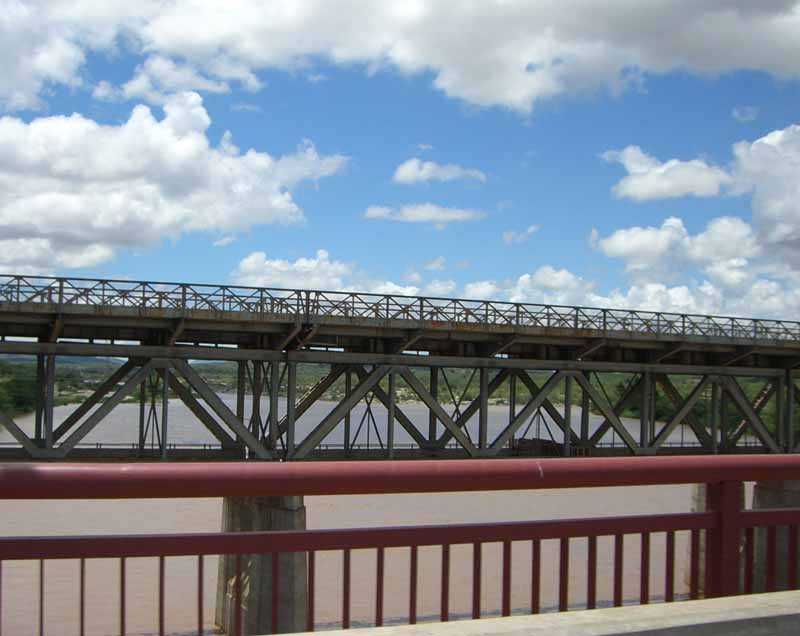
- Beitbridge Bulawayo Railway

General information
- Coordinates: 20°10′12″S 28°34′48″E
- System: Railway station

History
- Opened: inaugurated 15 July 1999
Location

The Beitbridge Bulawayo Railway (BBR) is a privately owned railway company that provides a rail link in Zimbabwe between Beitbridge at the South African border and Zimbabwe's second city Bulawayo.

The 3 ft 6 in (1,067 mm) Cape gauge BBR is a build-operate-transfer project that has shortened the distance between Bulawayo in Zimbabwe and South Africa to 317 kilometres (197 miles). Prior to its inauguration, rail service between South Africa and Bulawayo used a route through Botswana that is about 200 kilometres (120 miles) longer. The shorter line has been used primarily for freight transportation. The principal contractor was Concor.

New Limpopo Projects Investments Limited (NLPI), a Mauritius registered company, specialises in private sector investments using the build-operate-transfer (BOT) concept.

The BBR is one of the three connected NLPI railway operations in Zimbabwe and Zambia that form a rail link between South Africa and the Democratic Republic of Congo.

The BBR was inaugurated on 15 July 1999. After 30 years of service the BBR will be handed over to the National Railways of Zimbabwe at no cost. It has had a profound negative impact on the profitability of Botswana Railways that saw its Zimbabwe-related freight volume drop by 90,000 to 10,000 tons.

== See also ==
- South African Class 34-200
- South African Class 34-600
- South African Class 34-800
- South African Class 35-000
- South African Class 35-400
