= Kei Rail =

Overview
- Termini: AmaBhele; Mthatha

History
- Opened: 2008

Technical
- Track gauge: 3 ft 6 in (1,067 mm)

Kei Rail is a railway project in South Africa.

The Eastern Cape government restored rail services between AmaBhele and Mthatha, on an abandoned branch from the East London-Springfontein main line. Infrastructure was rebuilt, and passenger services restarted in March 2008. The local Department of Roads and Transport leases the network from Transnet Freight Rail, and Sheltam Grindrod are subcontracted to operate trains.

The project was part of a broader development plan for the region. The line has also been used by the Phelophepha health train. ECDORT planned several other projects to restore disused infrastructure in the province. However, funding was threatened and the service was not connected with the rest of the South African rail network; Kei Rail suspended services in November 2010 but resumed in June 2011.

20 coaches were repossessed by Transnet Rail Engineering, and sold to an Angolan railway operator in September 2011.

In September 2012 PRASA withdrew their support as station operator and on 31 October 2012 the Eastern Cape Department of Transport suspended the service due to lack of funds for the service. As of 2023, the train has not resumed service.
