= South African Class 7E3, Series 2 =

Type of electric locomotive

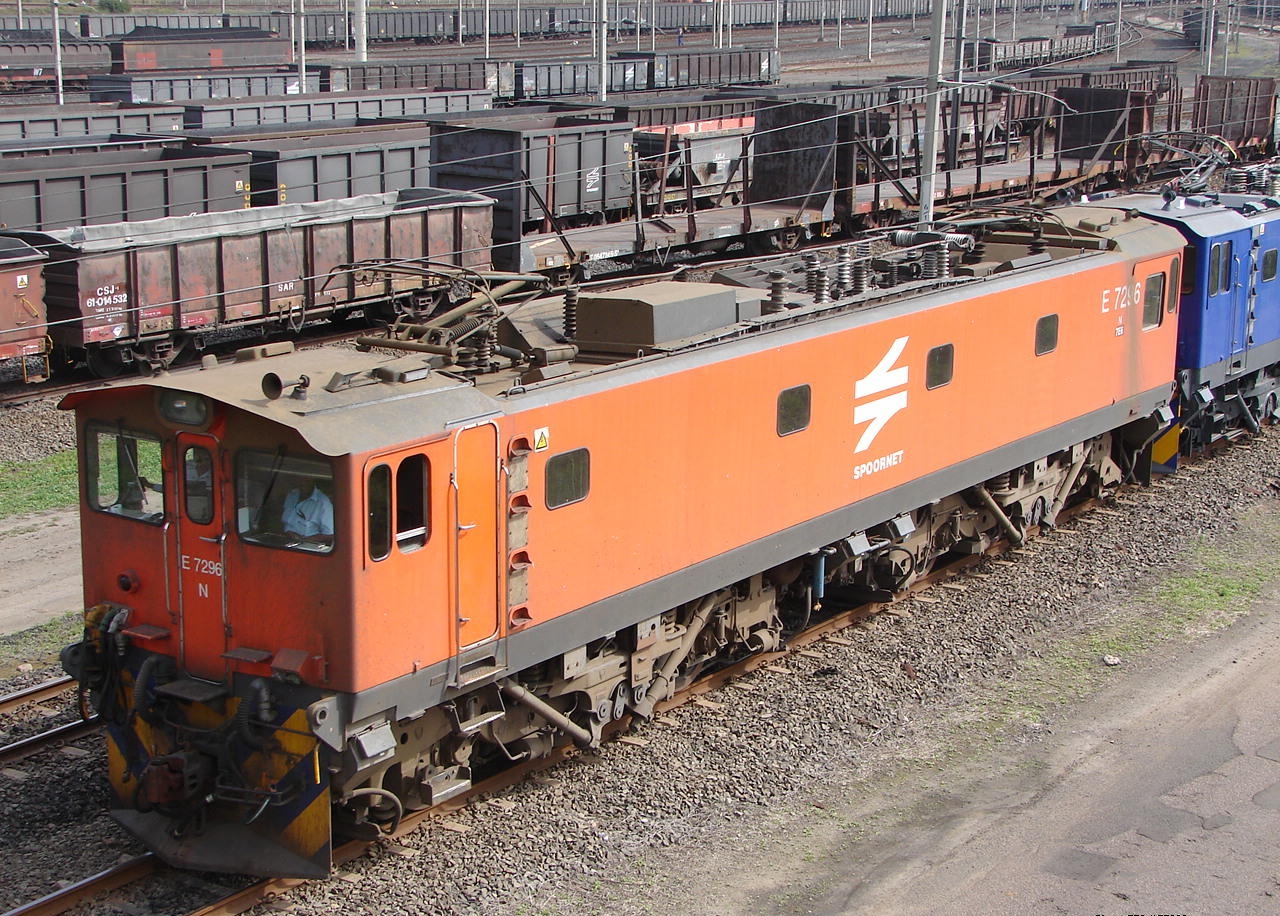
- No. E7296 at Richards Bay, 14 August 2007
Type and origin
- Power type: Electric
- Designer: Hitachi
- Builder: Dorbyl
- Model: Hitachi 7E3
- Build date: 1984-1985
- Total produced: 25
- Rebuilder: Transwerk
- Rebuild date: 2000-2003
- Number rebuilt: 1 to Class 7E4
Specifications
- Configuration
  - AAR: C-C
  - UIC: Co'Co'
  - Commonwealth: Co-Co
- Gauge: 3 ft 6 in (1,067 mm) Cape gauge
- Wheel diameter: 1,220 mm (48.03 in)
- Wheelbase: 13,460 mm (44 ft 1 7/8 in)
  - Bogie: 4,060 mm (13 ft 3 7/8 in)
- Pivot centres: 10,200 mm (33 ft 5 5/8 in)
- Panto shoes: 12,075 mm (39 ft 7 3/8 in)
- Length
  - Over couplers: 18,430 mm (60 ft 5 5/8 in)
  - Over body: 17,480 mm (57 ft 4 1/4 in)
- Width: 2,906 mm (9 ft 6 3/8 in)
- Height
  - Pantograph: 4,180 mm (13 ft 8 5/8 in)
  - Body height: 3,941 mm (12 ft 11 1/8 in)
- Axle load: 21,420 kg (47,220 lb)
- Adhesive weight: 123,500 kg (272,300 lb)
- Loco weight: 123,500 kg (272,300 lb)
- Electric system/s: 25 kV AC/50 Hz catenary
- Current pickup: Pantographs
- Traction motors: Six HS-1054-GR
  - Rating 1 hour: 525 kW (704 hp)
  - Continuous: 500 kW (670 hp)
- Gear ratio: 16:94
- Loco brake: Air & Rheostatic
- Train brakes: Air & Vacuum
- Couplers: AAR knuckle
Performance figures
- Maximum speed: 100 km/h (62 mph)
- Power output
  - 1 hour: 3,150 kW (4,220 hp)
  - Continuous: 3,000 kW (4,000 hp)
- Tractive effort
  - Starting: 450 kN (100,000 lbf)
  - 1 hour: 319 kN (72,000 lbf)
  - Continuous: 300 kN (67,000 lbf)
Career
- Operators: South African Railways; Spoornet; Transnet Freight Rail
- Class: Class 7E3
- Number in class: 24
- Numbers: E7277-E7300
- Delivered: 1984-1985
- First run: 1984

The South African Railways Class 7E3, Series 2 of 1984 is an electric locomotive.

Between 1984 and 1985, the South African Railways placed twenty-five Class 7E3, Series 2 electric locomotives with a Co-Co wheel arrangement in mainline service. In c. 2001, one of these dual cab locomotives was rebuilt to a single cab locomotive and reclassified to Class 7E4.

== Manufacturer ==
The 25 kV AC Class 7E3, Series 2 electric locomotive was designed for the South African Railways (SAR) by Hitachi and built in South Africa by Dorbyl, who also supplied the mechanical components.

Twenty-five locomotives were delivered by Dorbyl between 1984 and 1985, numbered in the range from E7276 to E7300. Like Union Carriage and Wagon (UCW), Dorbyl did not allocate builder's numbers to the locomotives it built for the SAR, but used the SAR unit numbers for their record keeping.

== Characteristics ==
=== Appearance ===
These dual cab locomotives have a roof access ladder on one side only, just to the right of the cab access door. The roof access ladder end is marked as the no. 1 end. The Series 1 and Series 2 locomotives are visually indistinguishable from each other, but the two sides of the locomotives are sufficiently different in appearance that a pair of them coupled at the same ends appears at first glance to be two different locomotive types. The roof access ladder side is smooth, while the other side has several large grilles.

=== Pantographs ===
The locomotive's pantograph placement is unusual in not being equidistant from the locomotive ends. The contact shoe centre of the no. 1 end pantograph is 6,155 millimetres (20 feet 2.3 inches) from the longitudinal centre of the locomotive, while that of the no. 2 end pantograph is 5,920 millimetres (19 feet 5.1 inches) from the longitudinal centre.

=== Brakes ===
Control of traction and rheostatic braking on the Class 7E3 is by stepless solid-state electronics. The electrical equipment was designed for high power factor operation, obtained by the switching in of power-factor correction capacitors.

Unlike the Classes 7E and 7E2 Series 1 and 2, where thyristors are used, these locomotives use silicon-diode rectifiers.

=== Bogies ===
To reduce flange and rail wear, the bogies of the Class 7E3 have a shorter wheelbase than the Class 7E1, 4,060 millimetres (13 feet 3.8 inches) instead of 4,400 millimetres (14 feet 5.2 inches).

Like the Class 7E1, the Class 7E3 was built with sophisticated traction linkages on the bogies. Together with the locomotive's electronic wheel-slip detection system, these traction struts, mounted between the linkages on the bogies and the locomotive body and colloquially referred to as grasshopper legs, ensure the maximum transfer of power to the rails without causing wheel-slip, by reducing the adhesion of the leading bogie and increasing that of the trailing bogie by as much as 15% upon starting.

== Reclassifications ==
In the period from the early 1990s until 2007, various modifications to improve downhill braking capacity were done to the Coalink line's Hitachi-designed locomotives. The first set of upgrades were done on the fifty Class 7E1 locomotives.

=== Class 7E4 ===
From 2001, seventeen Class 7E3 locomotives, sixteen Series 1, numbers E7260 to E7275, and one Series 2, no. E7276, underwent significant modifications. This included the installation of Hitachi micro-processor controls with improved rheostatic brakes, auxiliary inverters which were designed and built by Fuji, and conversion from double cab to single cab, since the no. 2 end cab space was required for some of the new equipment. These modified single-cab locomotives were reclassified to Class 7E4.

=== Class 7E5 ===
The conversions to Class 7E4 were costly, however, and it was decided to modify further Class 7E3 locomotives to a lesser extent, gaining almost the same benefits at a lower cost, since they remained as double-cab locomotives. The first batch to be upgraded in this manner, were Series 2 numbers E7286 to E7300, but others followed, in total about fifty locomotives of both series. These were reclassified to Class 7E5, although externally they were still identical to the Class 7E3.

=== Class 7E6 ===
Following some systems failures on the upgraded Class 7E5 locomotives, a further variation in the modifications was applied to the remaining Class 7E3 locomotives which had not yet been upgraded. These units were then reclassified to Class 7E6. Eventually all the Class 7E5 locomotives were also modified once again to meet the Class 7E6 specifications.

=== Revert to Class 7E3 ===
By October 2007 all these locomotives were fully upgraded and standardised in respect of their rheostat flat topping and EPROM software. Since, apart from the single cab Class 7E4 conversions, they were once again all identical, those which had been reclassified to Classes 7E5 and 7E6 reverted to their original Class 7E3 classifications. Although numbers E7277 to E7300 are all officially Class 7E3, Series 2 once again, many of them still bore markings for several years to identify them as either Class 7E5 or Class 7E6. The single-cab no. E7276, however, remains classified as Class 7E4.

== Service ==
Since 1978, 25 kV AC was introduced on all new mainline electrification projects bar one, the exception being the Orex iron ore line from Sishen to Saldanha where 50 kV AC is used. The Class 7E3, Series 2 locomotives all serve on the 25 kV Coalink line from Ermelo via Vryheid to the Richards Bay Coal Terminal.

== JANUARY 2022 ==
7E3 SERIES 2
Header text	Header text	Header text	Header text	Header text	Header text
7276					
7277	SPOORNET BLUE	2021	DE AAR		
7278	SPOORNET ORANGE	2021	DE AAR		
7279	SPOORNET ORANGE	2021	KIMBERLEY		STORED STEAM SHED
7280	SPOORNET BLUE	2021	DE AAR		
7281	X	X	X	SCRAPPED	
7282	SPOORNET BLUE	2021	DE AAR		
7283	X	X	X	SCRAPPED	
7284	X	X	X	SCRAPPED	
7285	SPOORNET ORANGE	2021	DE AAR		
7286	SPOORNET ORANGE	2021	DE AAR		
7287					
7288	X	X	X	SCRAPPED	
7289	SPOORNET ORANGE	2020	PORT ELIZABETH		
7290	SPOORNET ORANGE	2021	DE AAR		
7291	SPOORNET ORANGE	2021	DE AAR		
7292	SPOORNET ORANGE	2021	DE AAR		
7293	SPOORNET ORANGE	2018	PORT ELIZABETH		
7294	SPOORNET BLUE	2021	DE AAR		
7295	SPOORNET ORANGE	2021	KIMBERLEY		STORED STEAM SHED
7296	X	X	X	SCRAPPED	
7297	SPOORNET BLUE	2021	DE AAR		
7298	SPOORNET BLUE	2021	KIMBERLY		
7299	X	X	X	SCRAPPED	
7300	SPOORNET ORANGE	2021	KIMBERLY		STORED STEAM SHED

== Liveries ==
All the Class 7E3, Series 2 locomotives were delivered in the SAR red oxide livery with signal red buffer beams and cowcatchers, yellow whiskers and with the number plates on the sides mounted on three-stripe yellow wings. In the 1990s some of them were repainted in the Spoornet orange livery with a yellow and blue chevron pattern on the buffer beams and cowcatchers. In the late 1990s many were repainted in the Spoornet blue livery with either solid or outline numbers on the long hood sides.

== Illustration ==
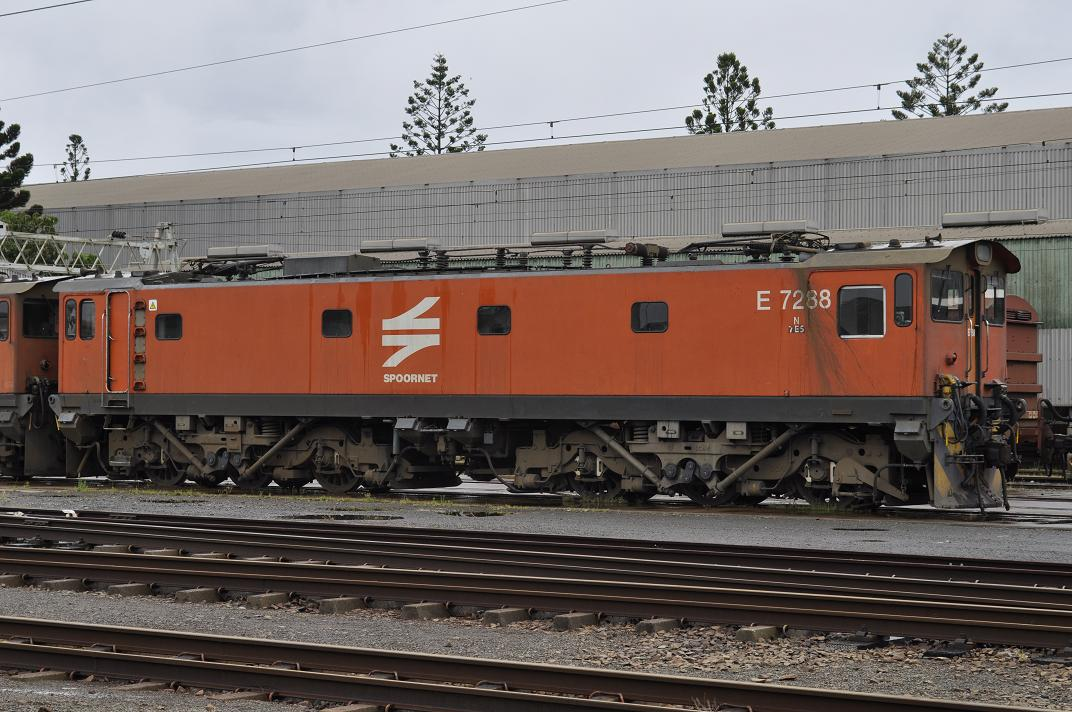
No. E7288, left side, in Spoornet orange livery and inscribed 7E5 at Richards Bay, KwaZulu-Natal, 16 December 2010

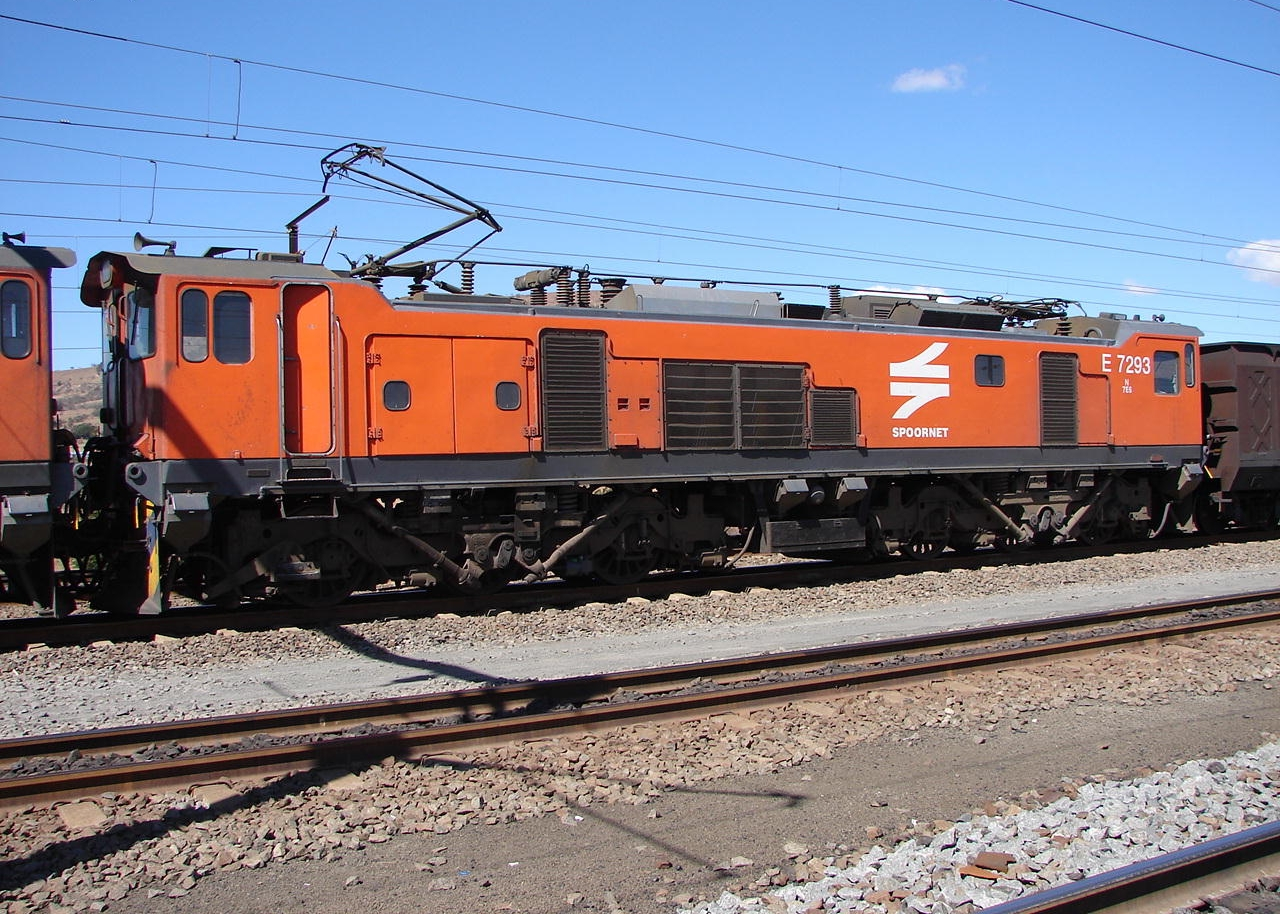
No. E7293, right side, in Spoornet orange livery and inscribed 7E5 at Vryheid, KwaZulu-Natal, 16 August 2007

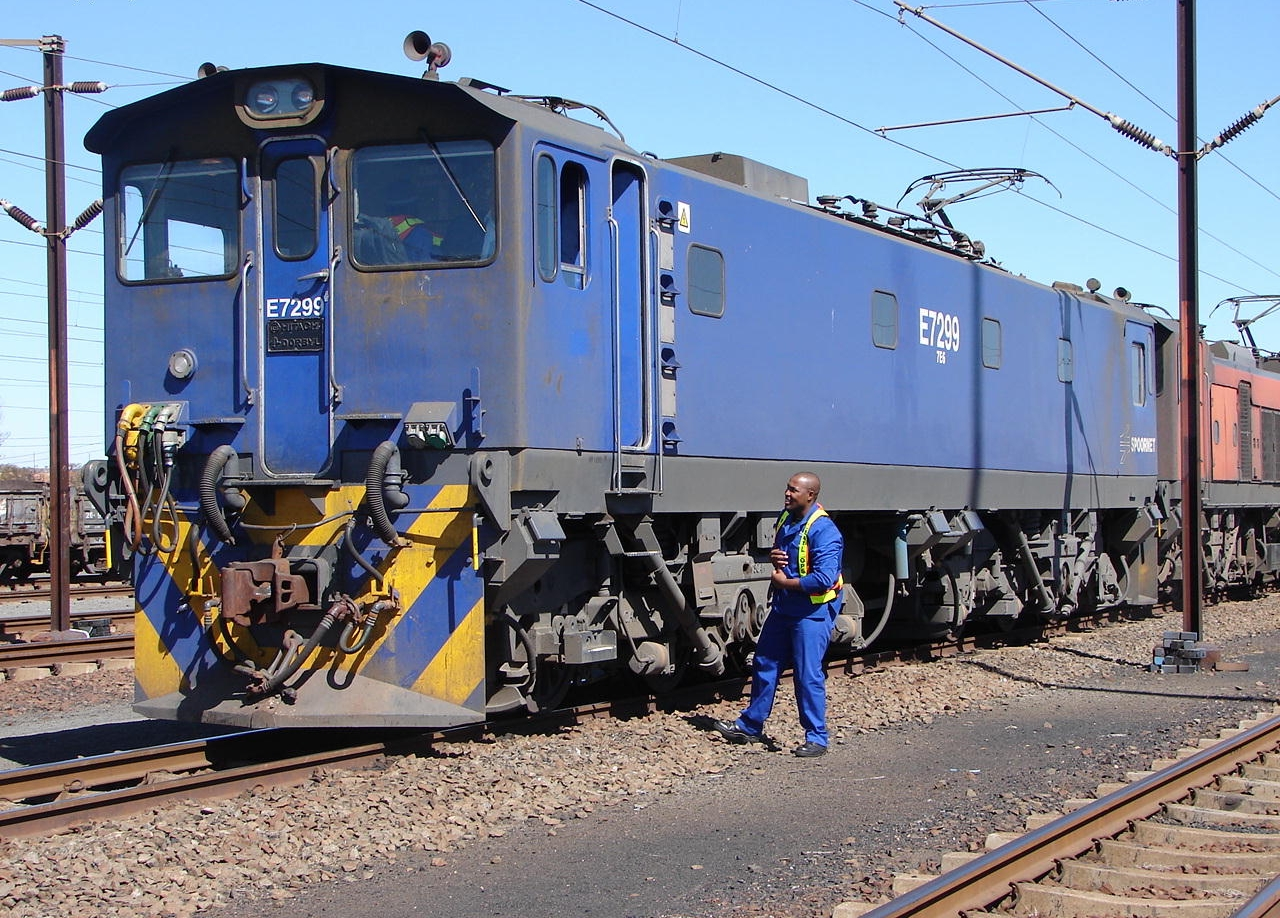
No. E7299 in Spoornet blue livery with solid numbers and inscribed 7E6 at Vryheid, KwaZulu-Natal, 16 August 2007

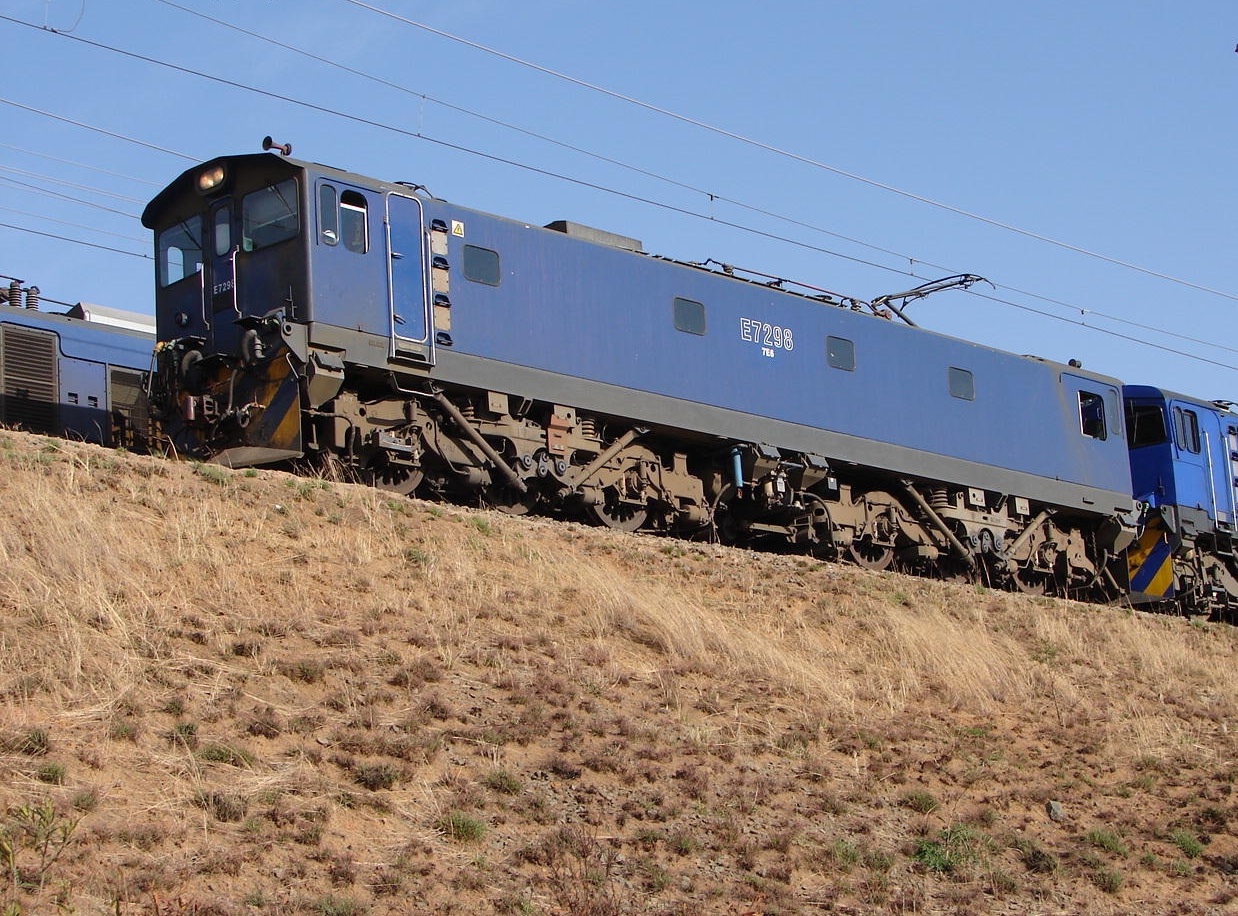
No. E7298 in Spoornet blue livery with outline numbers and inscribed 7E6 at Vryheid, KwaZulu-Natal, 15 August 2007
