= South African Class 7E3, Series 1 =

Class of 60 South African electric locomotives

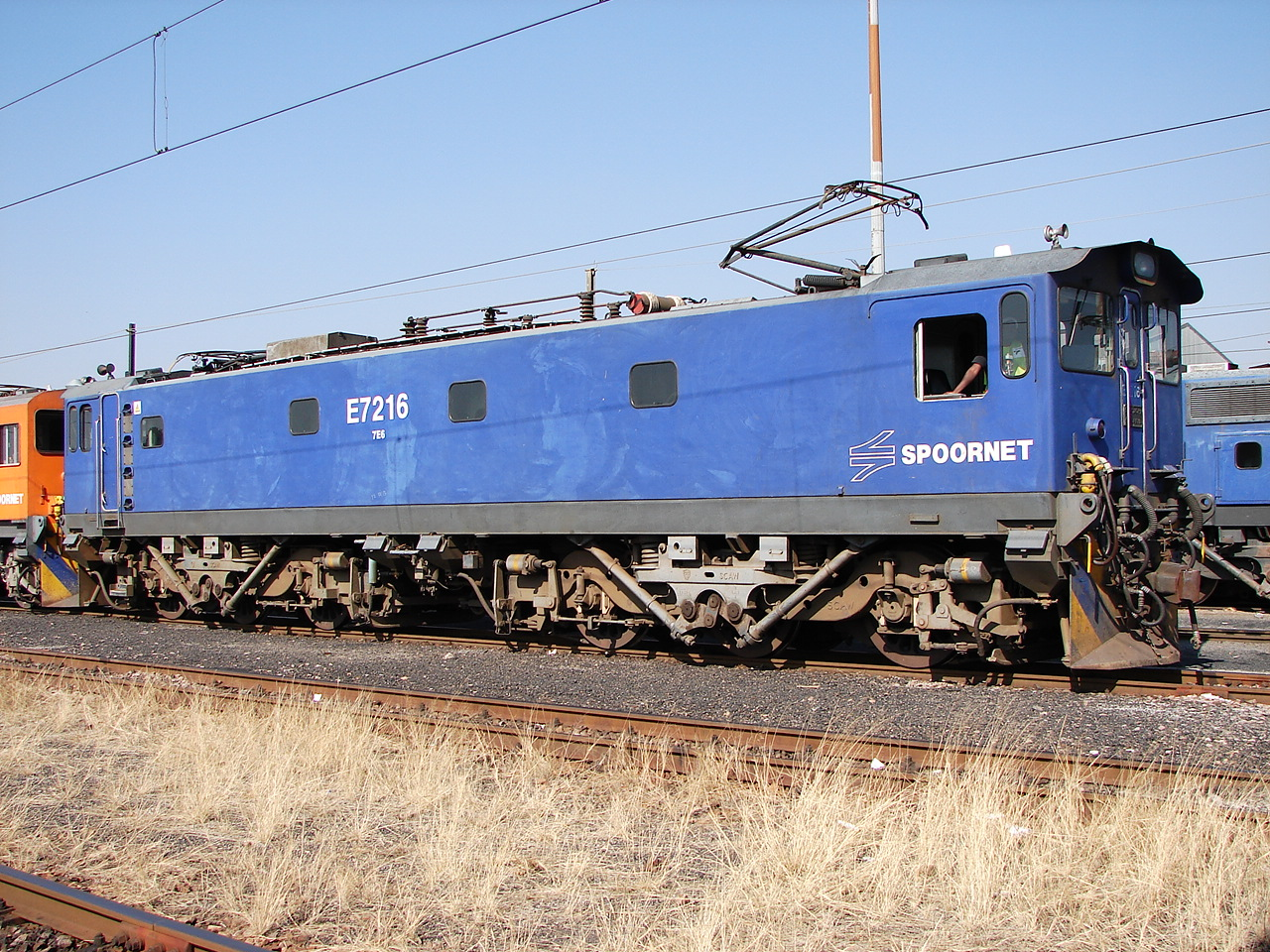
- No. E7216 at Pyramid South, Pretoria, 14 May 2013
Type and origin
- Power type: Electric
- Designer: Hitachi
- Builder: Dorbyl
- Model: Hitachi 7E3
- Build date: 1983–1984
- Total produced: 60
- Rebuilder: Transwerk
- Rebuild date: 2000–2003
- Number rebuilt: 16 to Class 7E4
Specifications
- Configuration
  - AAR: C-C
  - UIC: Co'Co'
  - Commonwealth: Co-Co
- Gauge: 3 ft 6 in (1,067 mm) Cape gauge
- Wheel diameter: 1,220 mm (48.03 in)
- Wheelbase: 13,460 mm (44 ft 1 7/8 in)
  - Bogie: 4,060 mm (13 ft 3 7/8 in)
- Pivot centres: 10,200 mm (33 ft 5 5/8 in)
- Panto shoes: 12,075 mm (39 ft 7 3/8 in)
- Length
  - Over couplers: 18,430 mm (60 ft 5 5/8 in)
  - Over body: 17,480 mm (57 ft 4 1/4 in)
- Width: 2,906 mm (9 ft 6 3/8 in)
- Height
  - Pantograph: 4,180 mm (13 ft 8 5/8 in)
  - Body height: 3,941 mm (12 ft 11 1/8 in)
- Axle load: 21,420 kg (47,220 lb)
- Adhesive weight: 123,500 kg (272,300 lb)
- Loco weight: 123,500 kg (272,300 lb)
- Electric system/s: 25 kV AC 50 Hz catenary
- Current pickup(s): Pantographs
- Traction motors: Six HS-1054-GR
  - Rating 1 hour: 525 kW (704 hp)
  - Continuous: 500 kW (670 hp)
- Gear ratio: 16:94
- Loco brake: Air & Rheostatic
- Train brakes: Air & Vacuum
- Couplers: AAR knuckle
Performance figures
- Maximum speed: 100 km/h (62 mph)
- Power output
  - 1 hour: 3,150 kW (4,220 hp)
  - Continuous: 3,000 kW (4,000 hp)
- Tractive effort
  - Starting: 450 kN (100,000 lbf)
  - 1 hour: 319 kN (72,000 lbf)
  - Continuous: 300 kN (67,000 lbf)
Career
- Operators: South African Railways; Spoornet; Transnet Freight Rail
- Class: Class 7E3
- Number in class: 44
- Numbers: E7216-E7259
- Delivered: 1983–1984
- First run: 1983

The South African Railways Class 7E3, Series 1 of 1983 is an electric locomotive.

Between 1983 and 1984, the South African Railways placed sixty Class 7E3, Series 1 electric locomotives with a Co-Co wheel arrangement in mainline service. Beginning in 2001, sixteen of these dual cab locomotives were rebuilt to single cab locomotives and reclassified to Class 7E4.

== Manufacturer ==
The 25 kV AC Class 7E3, Series 1 electric locomotive was designed for the South African Railways (SAR) by Hitachi and built in South Africa by Dorbyl, who also supplied the mechanical components. Sixty locomotives were delivered by Dorbyl in 1983 and 1984, numbered in the range from E7216 to E7275.

Like Union Carriage and Wagon (UCW), Dorbyl did not allocate builder's numbers to the locomotives it built for the SAR, but used the SAR unit numbers for their record keeping.

== Features ==
=== Appearance ===
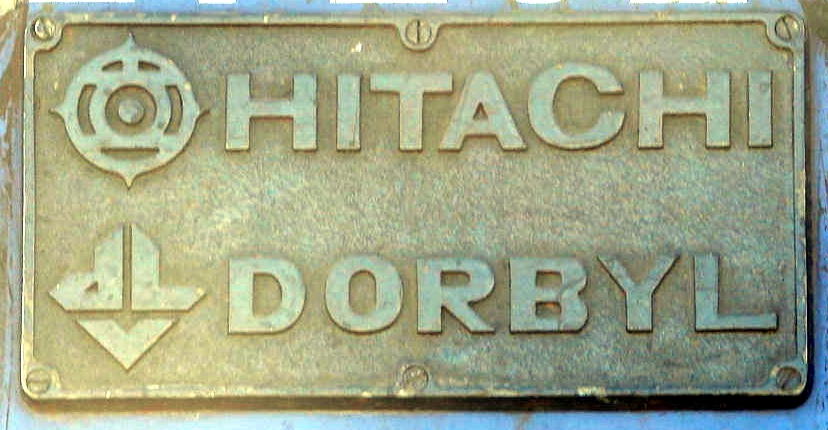
Builders' plate, no. E7252

These dual cab locomotives have a roof access ladder on one side only, just to the right of the cab access door. The roof access ladder end is marked as the no. 1 end. Series 1 and Series 2 locomotives are visually indistinguishable from each other, but the two sides of both series are sufficiently different in appearance that a pair of them coupled at the same ends appears at first glance to be two different locomotive types. The roof access ladder side is smooth, while the other side has several large grilles.

=== Pantographs ===
The locomotive's pantograph placement is unusual in not being equidistant from the locomotive ends. The contact shoe centre of the no. 1 end pantograph is 6,155 millimetres (20 feet 2.3 inches) from the longitudinal centre of the locomotive, while that of the no. 2 end pantograph is 5,920 millimetres (19 feet 5.1 inches) from the longitudinal centre.

=== Brakes ===
On the Class 7E3, Series 1, control of traction and rheostatic braking is by stepless solid-state electronics. The electrical equipment was designed for high power factor operation, obtained by the switching in of power-factor correction capacitors.

Unlike the Classes 7E and 7E2 Series 1 and 2 where thyristors are used, these locomotives use silicon-diode rectifiers.

=== Bogies ===
To reduce flange and rail wear, the bogies of the Class 7E3 have a shorter wheelbase than the Class 7E1, 4,060 millimetres (13 feet 3.8 inches) instead of 4,400 millimetres (14 feet 5.2 inches).

Like the Class 7E1, the Class 7E3 was built with sophisticated traction linkages on the bogies. Together with the locomotive's electronic wheel-slip detection system these traction struts, mounted between the linkages on the bogies and the locomotive body and colloquially referred to as grasshopper legs, ensure the maximum transfer of power to the rails without causing wheel-slip by reducing the adhesion of the leading bogie and increasing that of the trailing bogie by as much as 15% upon starting.

== Reclassifications ==
In the period from the early 1990s until 2007, various modifications to improve downhill braking capacity were done to the Coalink line's Hitachi-designed locomotives. The first set of upgrades were done on the fifty Class 7E1 locomotives.

=== Class 7E4 ===
From 2001, seventeen Class 7E3 locomotives, sixteen Series 1, numbers E7260 to E7275, and one Series 2, no. E7276, underwent significant modifications. This included the installation of Hitachi micro-processor controls with improved rheostatic brakes, auxiliary inverters designed and built by Fuji, and the conversion from double cab to single cab since the no. 2 end cab space was required for some of the new equipment. These modified single-cab locomotives were reclassified to Class 7E4.

=== Class 7E5 ===
The conversions to Class 7E4 were costly, however, and it was decided to modify further Class 7E3 locomotives to a lesser extent, gaining almost the same benefits at a lower cost since they remained as double cab locomotives. In total about fifty locomotives of both series were upgraded in this manner. These were reclassified to Class 7E5, although externally they were still identical to the Class 7E3.

=== Class 7E6 ===
Following some systems failures on the upgraded Class 7E5 locomotives, a further variation in the modifications was applied to the remaining Class 7E3 locomotives which had not yet been upgraded. These units were then reclassified to Class 7E6. Eventually all the Class 7E5 locomotives were also modified once again to meet the Class 7E6 specifications.

=== Revert to Class 7E3 ===
By October 2007 all these locomotives were fully upgraded and standardised in respect of their rheostat flat topping and EPROM software. Since, apart from the single cab Class 7E4 conversions, they were once again all identical, those which had been reclassified to Classes 7E5 and 7E6 reverted to their original Class 7E3 classifications. Although numbers E7216 to E7259 are all officially designated Class 7E3, Series 1 once again, many of these 44 locomotives still bore markings for several years to identify them as either Class 7E5 or Class 7E6. The single cab locomotives remained classified as Class 7E4.

== Service ==
Since 1978, 25 kV AC was introduced on all new mainline electrification projects bar one, the exception being the Orex iron ore line from Sishen to Saldanha where 50 kV AC is used. The Class 7E3, Series 1 locomotives all served on the 25 kV AC Coalink line from Ermelo via Vryheid to the Richards Bay Coal Terminal. They remained there until sufficient numbers of the new Class 19E were available by about 2011 to allow some of the Class 7E3 to be re-allocated to Pyramid South, north of Pretoria.

== Liveries ==
All the Class 7E3, Series 1 locomotives were delivered in the SAR red oxide livery with signal red buffer beams and cowcatchers, yellow whiskers and with the number plates on the sides mounted on three-stripe yellow wings. In the 1990s some of them were repainted in the Spoornet orange livery with a yellow and blue chevron pattern on the buffer beams and cowcatchers. In the late 1990s many were repainted in the Spoornet blue livery with either solid or outline numbers on the long hood sides.

== Illustration ==
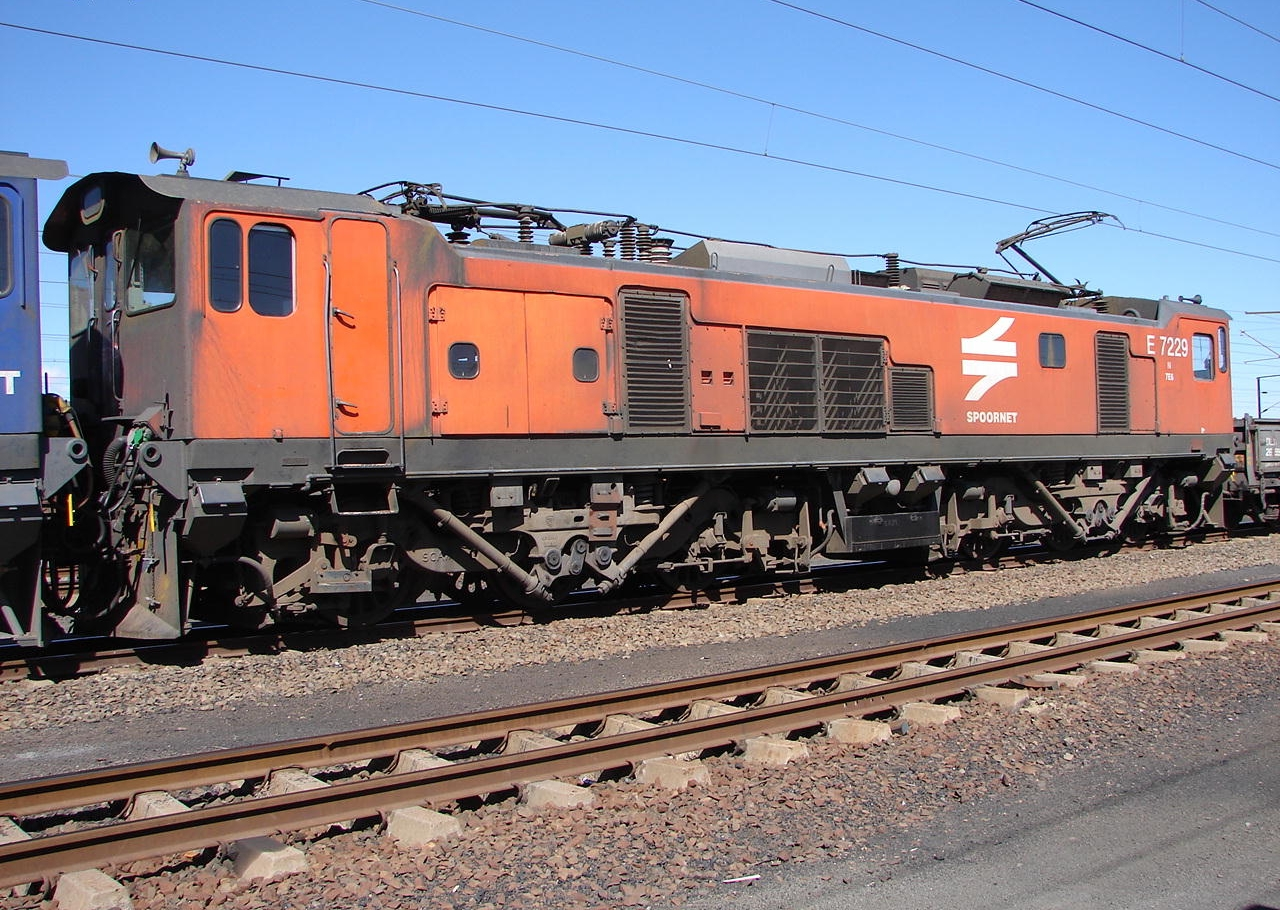
No. E7229 in Spoornet orange livery at Vryheid, 16 August 2007

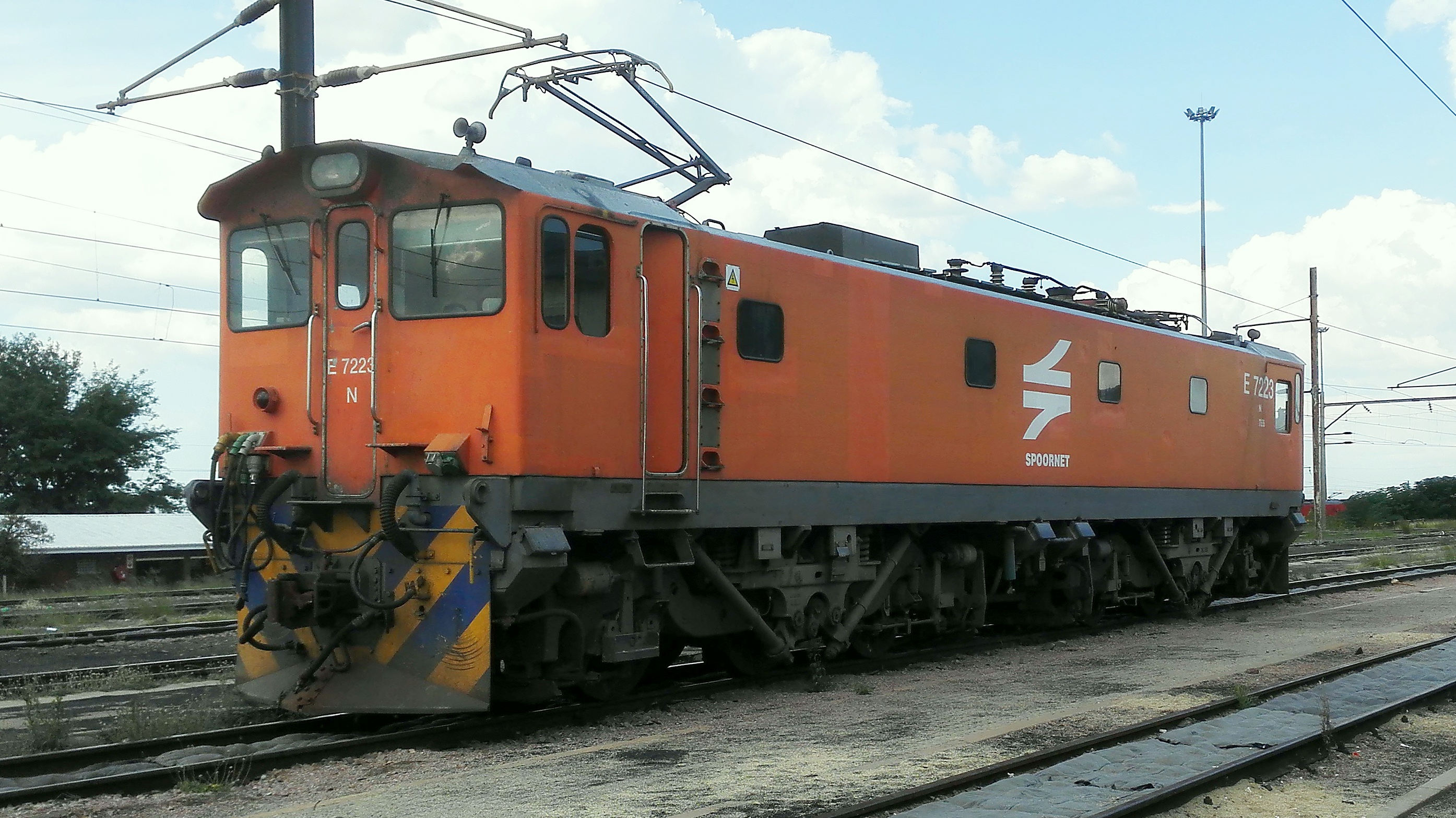
No. E7223 in Spoornet orange livery at Pyramid South, 11 March 2017

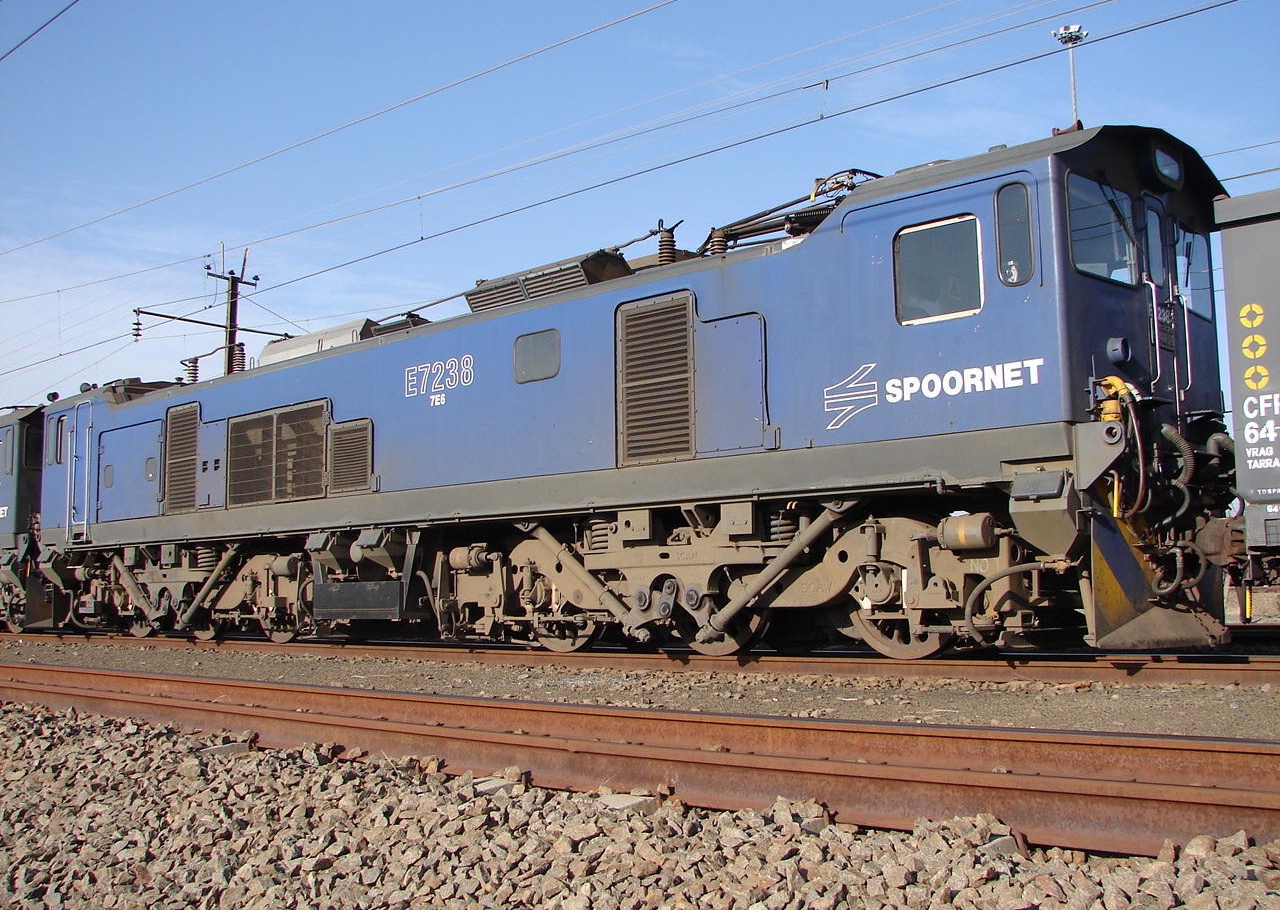
No. E7238 in blue with outline numbers at Vryheid, 15 August 2007
