= South African Class 7E4 =

2001 design of electric locomotive

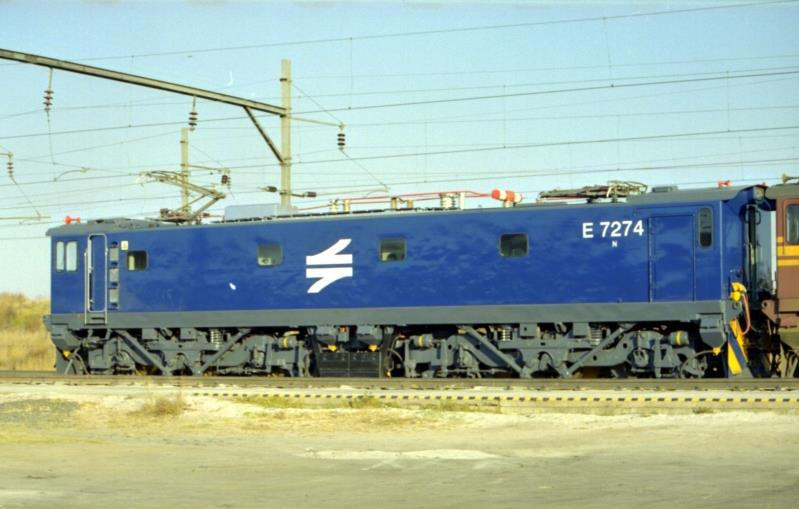
- No. E7274 c. 2000
Type and origin
- Power type: Electric
- Designer: Hitachi
- Builder: Transwerk
- Model: Hitachi 7E4
- Build date: 2000–2003
- Total produced: 17
Specifications
- Configuration
  - AAR: C-C
  - UIC: Co'Co'
  - Commonwealth: Co-Co
- Gauge: 3 ft 6 in (1,067 mm) Cape gauge
- Wheel diameter: 1,220 mm (48.03 in)
- Wheelbase: 13,460 mm (44 ft 1 7/8 in)
  - Bogie: 4,060 mm (13 ft 3 7/8 in)
- Pivot centres: 10,200 mm (33 ft 5 5/8 in)
- Panto shoes: 12,075 mm (39 ft 7 3/8 in)
- Length
  - Over couplers: 18,430 mm (60 ft 5 5/8 in)
  - Over body: 17,480 mm (57 ft 4 1/4 in)
- Width: 2,906 mm (9 ft 6 3/8 in)
- Height
  - Pantograph: 4,180 mm (13 ft 8 5/8 in)
  - Body height: 3,941 mm (12 ft 11 1/8 in)
- Axle load: 21,420 kg (47,220 lb)
- Adhesive weight: 123,500 kg (272,300 lb)
- Loco weight: 123,500 kg (272,300 lb)
- Electric system/s: 25 kV AC/50 Hz catenary
- Current pickup(s): Pantographs
- Traction motors: Six HS-1054-GR
  - Rating 1 hour: 525 kW (704 hp)
  - Continuous: 500 kW (670 hp)
- Gear ratio: 16:94
- Loco brake: Air & Rheostatic
- Train brakes: Air & Vacuum
- Couplers: AAR knuckle
Performance figures
- Maximum speed: 100 km/h (62 mph)
- Power output
  - 1 hour: 3,150 kW (4,220 hp)
  - Continuous: 3,000 kW (4,000 hp)
- Tractive effort
  - Starting: 450 kN (100,000 lbf)
  - 1 hour: 319 kN (72,000 lbf)
  - Continuous: 300 kN (67,000 lbf)
Career
- Operators: South African Railways; Spoornet; Transnet Freight Rail
- Class: Class 7E4
- Number in class: 17
- Numbers: E7260-E7276
- Nicknames: MacGyver
- Delivered: 2001
- First run: 2001

The Spoornet Class 7E4 of 2001 is a South African electric locomotive.

In 1983 and 1984, the South African Railways placed sixty Class 7E3, Series 1 electric locomotives with a Co-Co wheel arrangement in mainline service. These were followed by another twenty-five Class 7E3, Series 2 locomotives in 1984 and 1985. Beginning in 2000, Spoornet rebuilt seventeen of these dual-cab locomotives to single-cab locomotives and reclassified them to Class 7E4.

== Manufacturers ==
The 25 kV AC Class 7E3 electric locomotives were designed for the South African Railways (SAR) by Hitachi and built in South Africa by Dorbyl, who also supplied the mechanical components.

Sixty Series 1 locomotives were delivered by Dorbyl in 1983 and 1984, numbered in the range from E7216 to E7275, and twenty-five Series 2 locomotives in 1984 and 1985, numbered in the range from E7276 to E7300. Like Union Carriage and Wagon, Dorbyl did not allocate builder's numbers to the locomotives it built for the SAR, but used the SAR unit numbers for their record keeping.

== Modification and reclassification ==
In the period from the early 1990s until about 2007, various modifications to improve downhill braking capacity were done to the Coalink line's Hitachi-designed locomotives. The first set of upgrades was done on the fifty Class 7E1 locomotives.

Beginning in 2000, seventeen Class 7E3 locomotives, sixteen Series 1, numbered in the range from E7260 to E7275, and one Series 2, no. E7276, underwent significant modifications. This included the installation of Hitachi micro-processor controls with improved rheostatic brakes, auxiliary inverters designed and built by Fuji Electric, Thelma and Cutler-Hammer rheostat grids, fans by Donkin Fans in Port Elizabeth, and conversion from double-cab to single-cab since the no. 2 end cab space was required for some of the new equipment which was installed. These single-cab locomotives were reclassified to Class 7E4 and the first of them entered service early in 2001.

== Features ==
=== Appearance ===
The two sides of the locomotive are sufficiently different in appearance that a pair of them, coupled end to end, appears at first glance to be two different locomotive types. The left side is smooth while the right side has several large grilles.

=== Pantographs ===
The locomotive's pantograph placement is unusual in not being equidistant from the locomotive ends. The contact shoe centre of the front pantograph is 6,155 millimetres (20 feet 2.32 inches) from the longitudinal centre of the locomotive, while that of the rear pantograph is 5,920 millimetres (19 feet 5.07 inches) from the longitudinal centre.

=== Brakes ===
Control of traction and rheostatic braking on the Class 7E4 is by stepless solid-state electronics. The electrical equipment was designed for high power factor operation, obtained by the switching in of power-factor correction capacitors.

Unlike the Classes 7E and 7E2 Series 1 and 2, where thyristors are used, these locomotives use silicon-diode rectifiers.

=== Bogies ===
Like the Class 7E, the Class 7E4 was built with sophisticated traction linkages on the bogies. Together with the locomotive's electronic wheel-slip detection system, these traction struts, mounted between the linkages on the bogies and the locomotive body and colloquially referred to as grasshopper legs, ensure the maximum transfer of power to the rails without causing wheel-slip by reducing the adhesion of the leading bogie and increasing that of the trailing bogie by as much as 15% upon starting off.

== Service ==
Since 1978, 25 kV AC was introduced on all new mainline electrification projects bar one, the exception being the Orex iron ore line from Sishen to Saldanha, where 50 kV AC is used. The Class 7E4 locomotives all serve on the 25 kV AC Coalink line from Ermelo via Vryheid to the Richards Bay Coal Terminal.

== Livery ==
In the SAR and Spoornet eras, when the official liveries were Gulf Red and yellow whiskers for the SAR, and initially orange and later maroon for Spoornet, many selected electric locomotives and some diesel-electrics were painted blue for use with the Blue Train, but without altering the layout of the various paint schemes. Blue Train locomotives were therefore blue with yellow whiskers in the SAR era, blue with the Spoornet logo and the name "SPOORNET" in Spoornet's orange era, and blue with the Spoornet logo, but without the name "SPOORNET", in Spoornet's maroon era.

While it is doubtful that the intention was to have a Class 7E4 in blue train livery for blue train hauling on the Richards Bay line, the ones photographed, numbers E7272, E7274 and E7275, were nevertheless painted in Spoornet's maroon era Blue Train livery after being rebuilt, possibly to make them easier to identify at a glance.

== Illustration ==
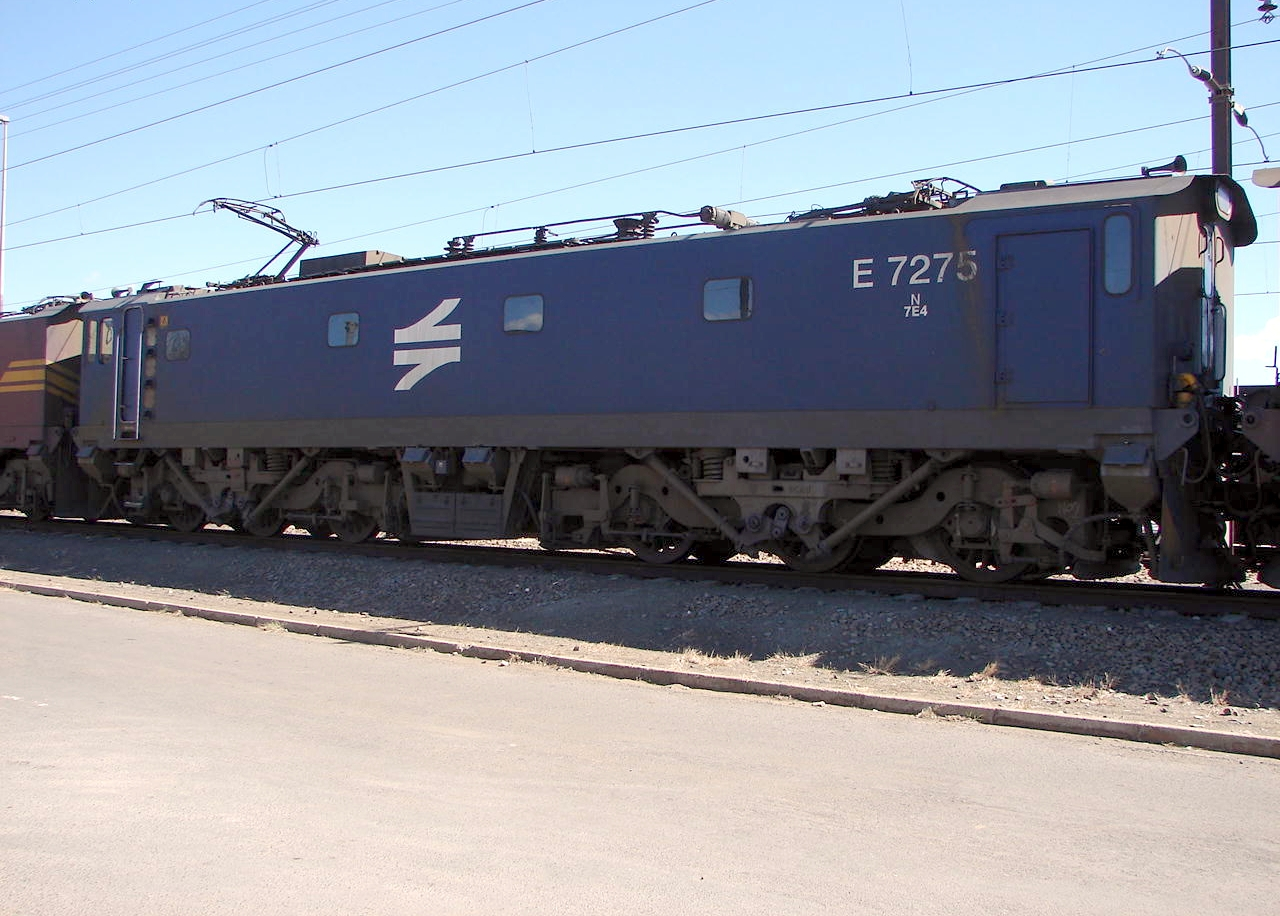
No. E7275 at Vryheid, 16 August 2007

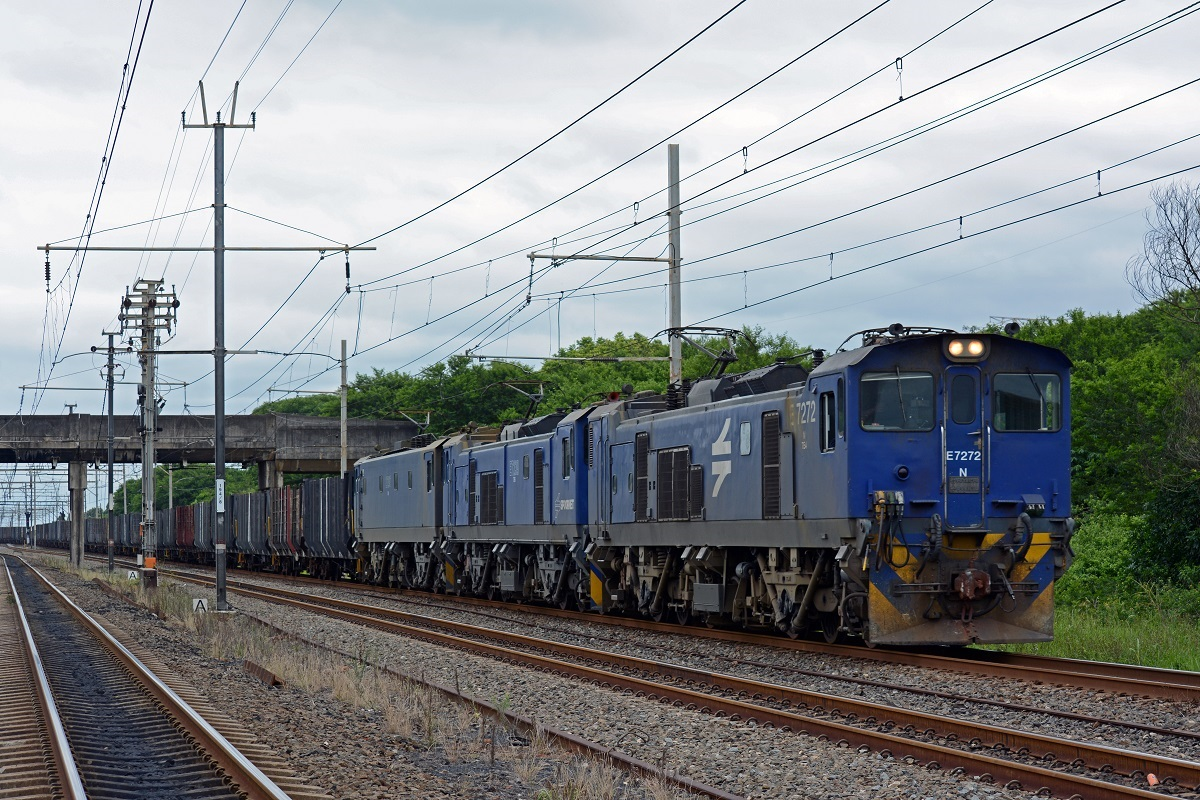
No. E7272 at Nsezi near Richards Bay, 8 December 2013
