= South African Class 7E1 =

1980 design of electric locomotive

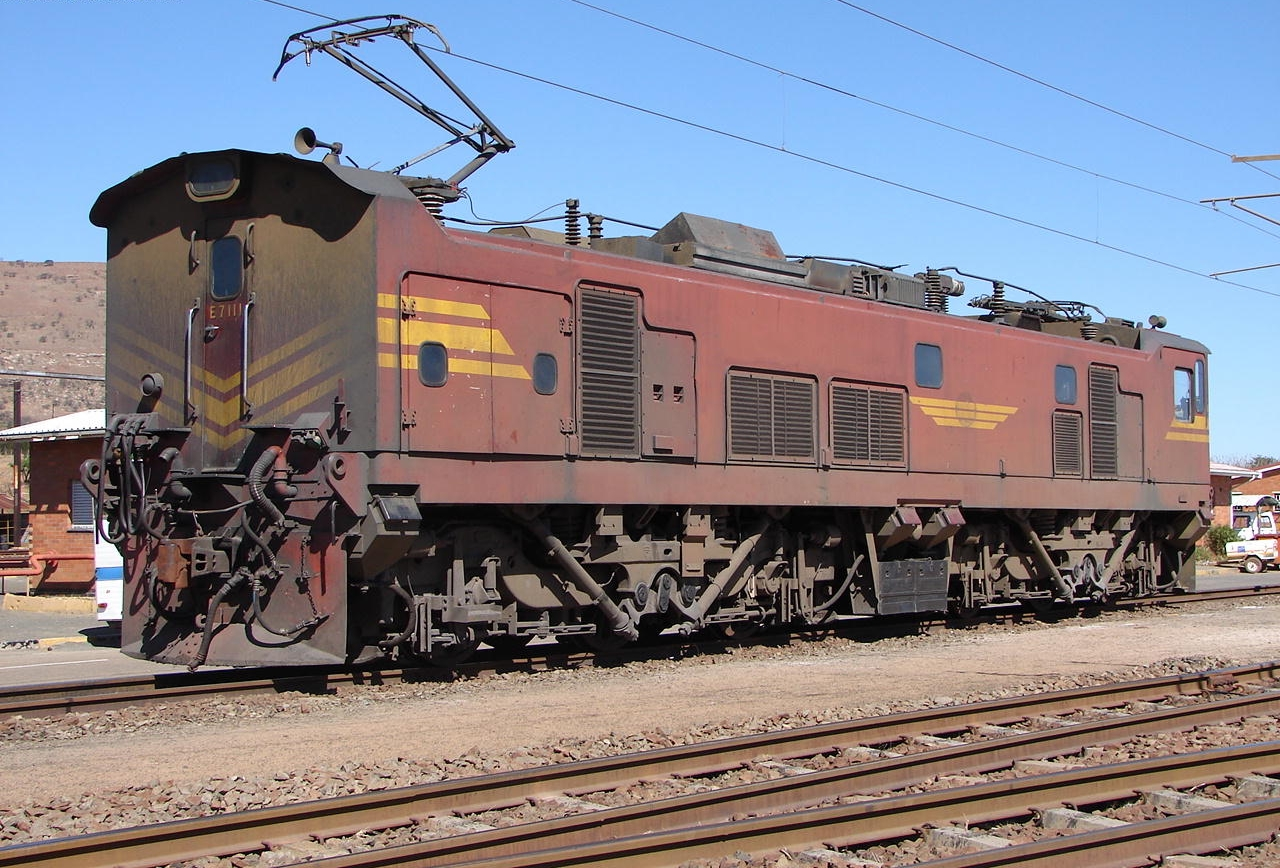
- No. E7111 at Vryheid, KwaZulu-Natal, 16 August 2007
Type and origin
- Power type: Electric
- Designer: Hitachi
- Builder: Hitachi & Dorbyl
- Model: Hitachi 7E1
- Build date: 1979-1981
- Total produced: 50
Specifications
- Configuration
  - AAR: C-C
  - UIC: Co′Co′
  - Commonwealth: Co-Co
- Gauge: 3 ft 6 in (1,067 mm) Cape gauge
- Wheel diameter: 1,220 mm (48.03 in)
- Wheelbase: 13,800 mm (45 ft 3 1/4 in)
  - Bogie: 4,400 mm (14 ft 5 1/4 in)
- Pivot centres: 10,200 mm (33 ft 5 5/8 in)
- Panto shoes: 11,530 mm (37 ft 9 7/8 in)
- Length
  - Over couplers: 18,430 mm (60 ft 5 5/8 in)
  - Over beams: 17,480 mm (57 ft 4 1/4 in)
- Width: 2,906 mm (9 ft 6 3/8 in)
- Height
  - Pantograph: 4,180 mm (13 ft 8 5/8 in)
  - Body height: 3,941 mm (12 ft 11 1/8 in)
- Axle load: 21,000 kg (46,000 lb)
- Adhesive weight: 125,500 kg (276,700 lb)
- Loco weight: 125,500 kg (276,700 lb)
- Electric system/s: 25 kV AC 50 Hz catenary
- Current pickup(s): Pantographs
- Traction motors: Six HS-1054-GR
  - Rating 1 hour: 525 kW (704 hp)
  - Continuous: 500 kW (670 hp)
- Gear ratio: 16:94
- Loco brake: Air & Rheostatic
- Train brakes: Air & Vacuum
- Couplers: AAR knuckle
Performance figures
- Maximum speed: 100 km/h (62 mph)
- Power output
  - 1 hour: 3,150 kW (4,220 hp)
  - Continuous: 3,000 kW (4,000 hp)
- Tractive effort
  - Starting: 450 kN (100,000 lbf)
  - 1 hour: 319 kN (72,000 lbf)
  - Continuous: 300 kN (67,000 lbf)
Career
- Operators: South African Railways; Spoornet; Transnet Freight Rail
- Class: Class 7E1
- Number in class: 50
- Numbers: E7101-E7150
- Delivered: 1980-1981
- First run: 1980

The South African Railways Class 7E1 of 1980 is an electric locomotive.

In 1980 and 1981, the South African Railways placed fifty Class 7E1 electric locomotives with a Co-Co wheel arrangement in mainline service.

== Manufacturers ==
The 25 kV AC Class 7E1 electric locomotive was designed for the South African Railways (SAR) by Hitachi, while Dorbyl in South Africa supplied the mechanical components. The first six locomotives, numbered E7101 to E7106, were built by Hitachi in Japan in 1979, while forty-four more were built by Dorbyl in South Africa between 1979 and 1981, numbered in the range from E7107 to E7150.

Like Union Carriage and Wagon, neither Hitachi nor Dorbyl allocated builder’s numbers to the Class 7E1 locomotives they built for the SAR, but used the SAR unit numbers for their record keeping.

== Features ==
=== Appearance ===
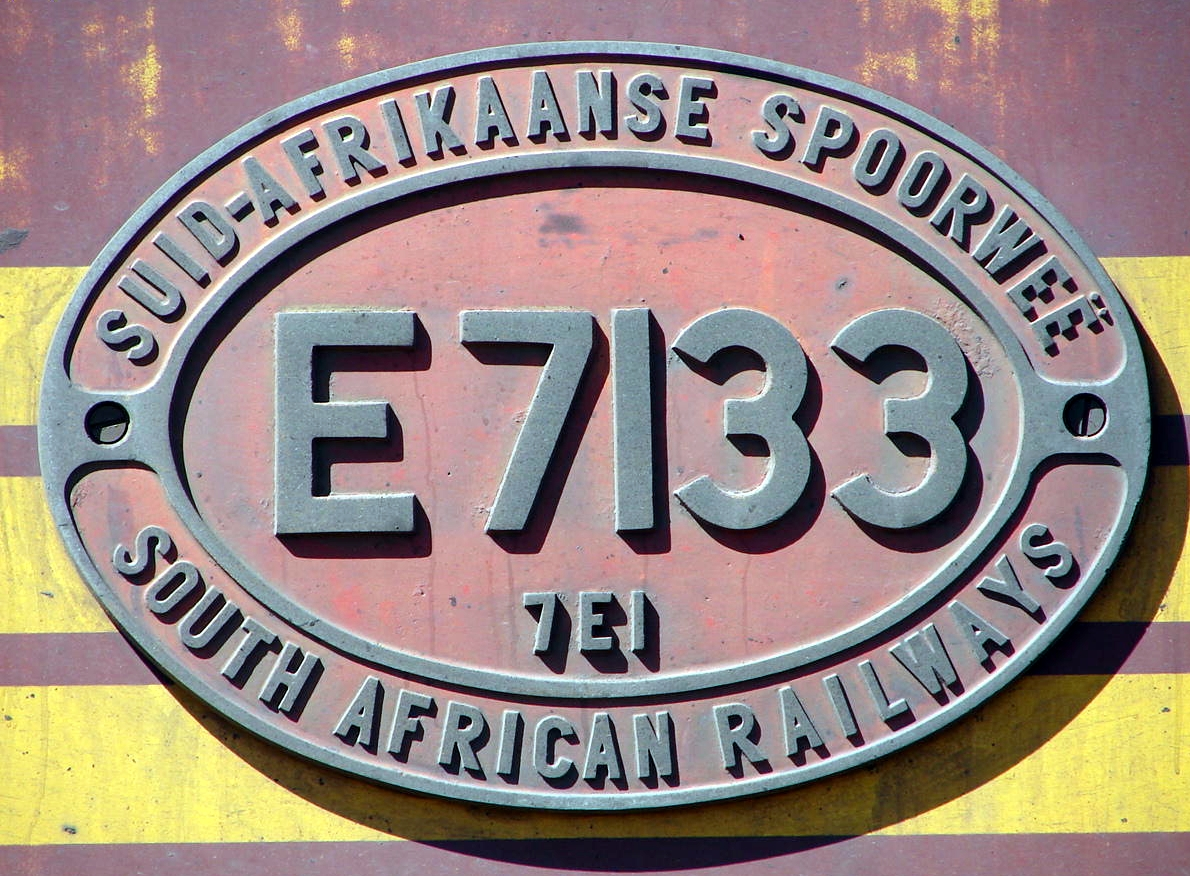
Builder's plate

Since they were acquired solely for use on the Richards Bay coal line where they would always work in multiple unit lashups, they were built with single cabs. Following the Class 9E which had entered service in 1978, the Class 7E1 was the second single cab mainline electric locomotive to be acquired by the SAR. Until the Class 9E was introduced in 1978, all South African mainline electric locomotives were dual cab units.

The two sides of the Class 7E1 are sufficiently different in appearance that, when coupled end to end, a pair of them appears at first glance to be two different locomotive types. The left side is smooth, while the right has several large grilles.

=== Pantographs ===
The locomotive's pantograph placement is unusual in not being equidistant from the locomotive ends. The contact shoe centre of the no. 1 end pantograph is 5,280 millimetres (17 feet 3.9 inches) from the longitudinal centre of the locomotive, while that of the no. 2 end pantograph is 6,250 millimetres (20 feet 6.1 inches) from the centre.

=== Brakes ===
Control of traction and rheostatic braking on the Class 7E1 is by stepless solid-state electronics. The electrical equipment was designed for high power factor operation, obtained by the switching in of power-factor correction capacitors.

Unlike the Classes 7E and 7E2, where thyristors are used, these locomotives use silicon-diode rectifiers.

In the period from the early 1990s until about 2007, various modifications to improve downhill braking capacity were done to the Coalink line's Hitachi-designed locomotives. The first set of upgrades were done on the fifty Class 7E1 locomotives. They retained their Class 7E1 classification after modification.

=== Bogies ===
Like the Class 6E1 and Class 7E, the Class 7E1 was built with sophisticated traction linkages on the bogies. Together with the locomotive's electronic wheel-slip detection system, these traction struts, mounted between the linkages on the bogies and the locomotive body and colloquially referred to as grasshopper legs, ensure the maximum transfer of power to the rails without causing wheel-slip by reducing the adhesion of the leading bogie and increasing that of the trailing bogie by as much as 15% upon starting off.

== Service ==
The Class 7E1 was placed in service on the 25 kV AC Ermelo-Richards Bay Coalink line, where most of them still work. By 2015 some had been transferred to Pyramid South.

== Liveries ==
All the Class 7E1 locomotives were delivered in the SAR Gulf Red livery with signal red cowcatchers, yellow whiskers and with the number plates on the sides mounted on three-stripe yellow wings. In the late 1990s many were repainted in the Spoornet blue livery with either outline or solid numbers on the sides and with a yellow and blue chevron pattern on the cowcatchers. After 2008 in the Transnet Freight Rail (TFR) era, several received the TFR red, green and yellow livery.

== Illustration ==
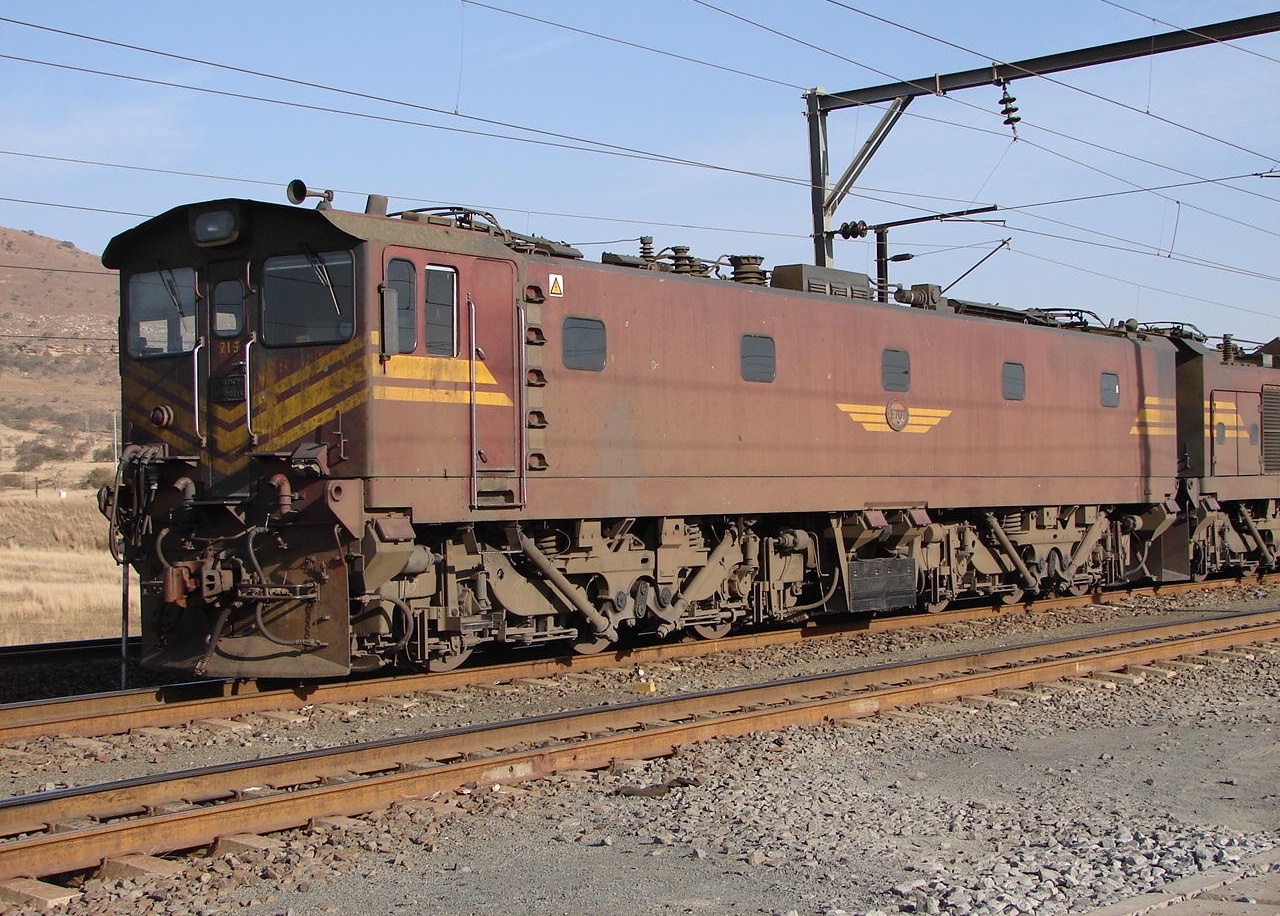
No. E7137 in SAR Gulf Red and yellow whiskers livery at Vryheid, KwaZulu-Natal, 15 August 2007

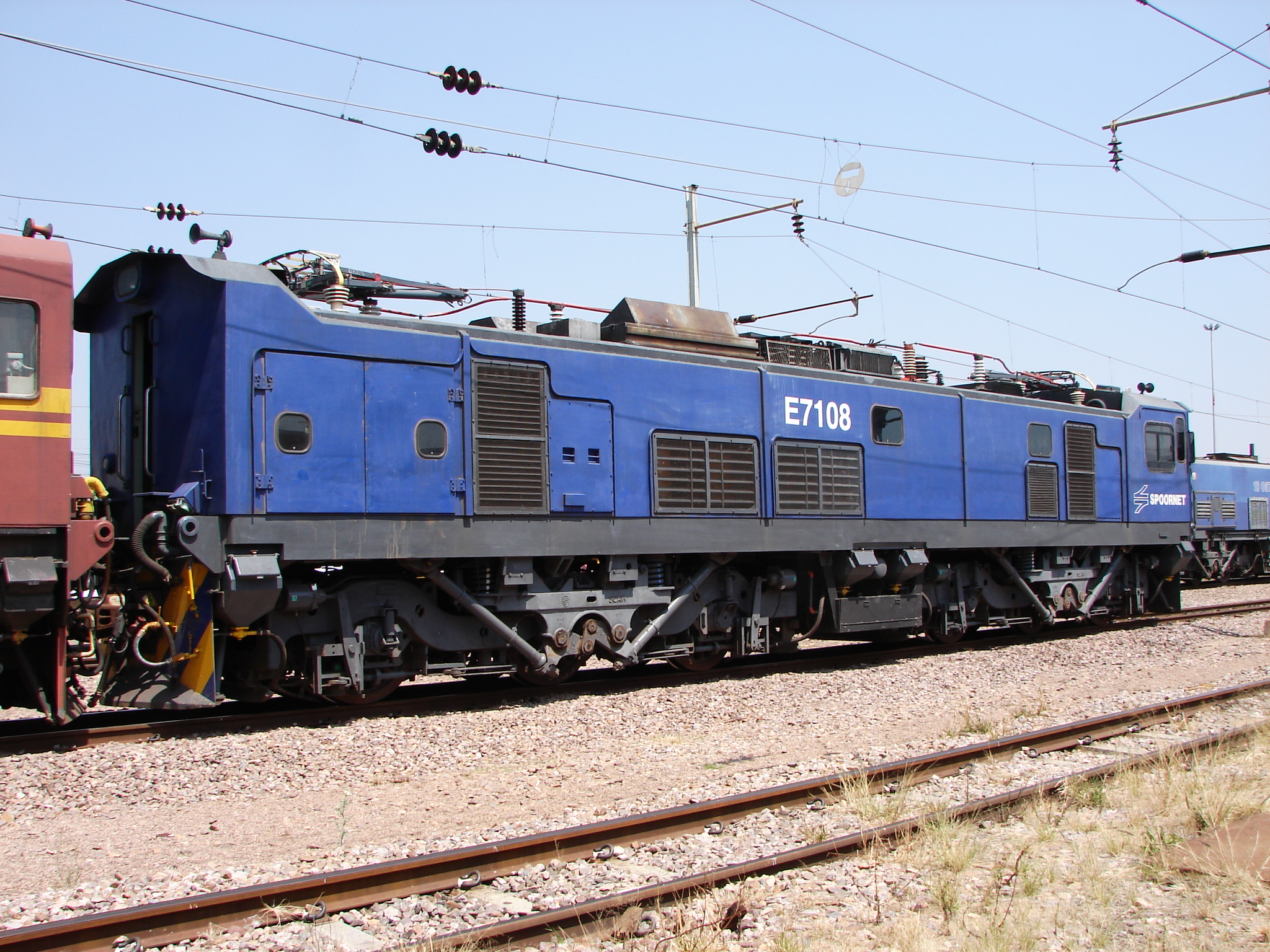
No. E7108 in Spoornet blue livery with solid numbers, Pyramid South, Gauteng, 22 September 2015

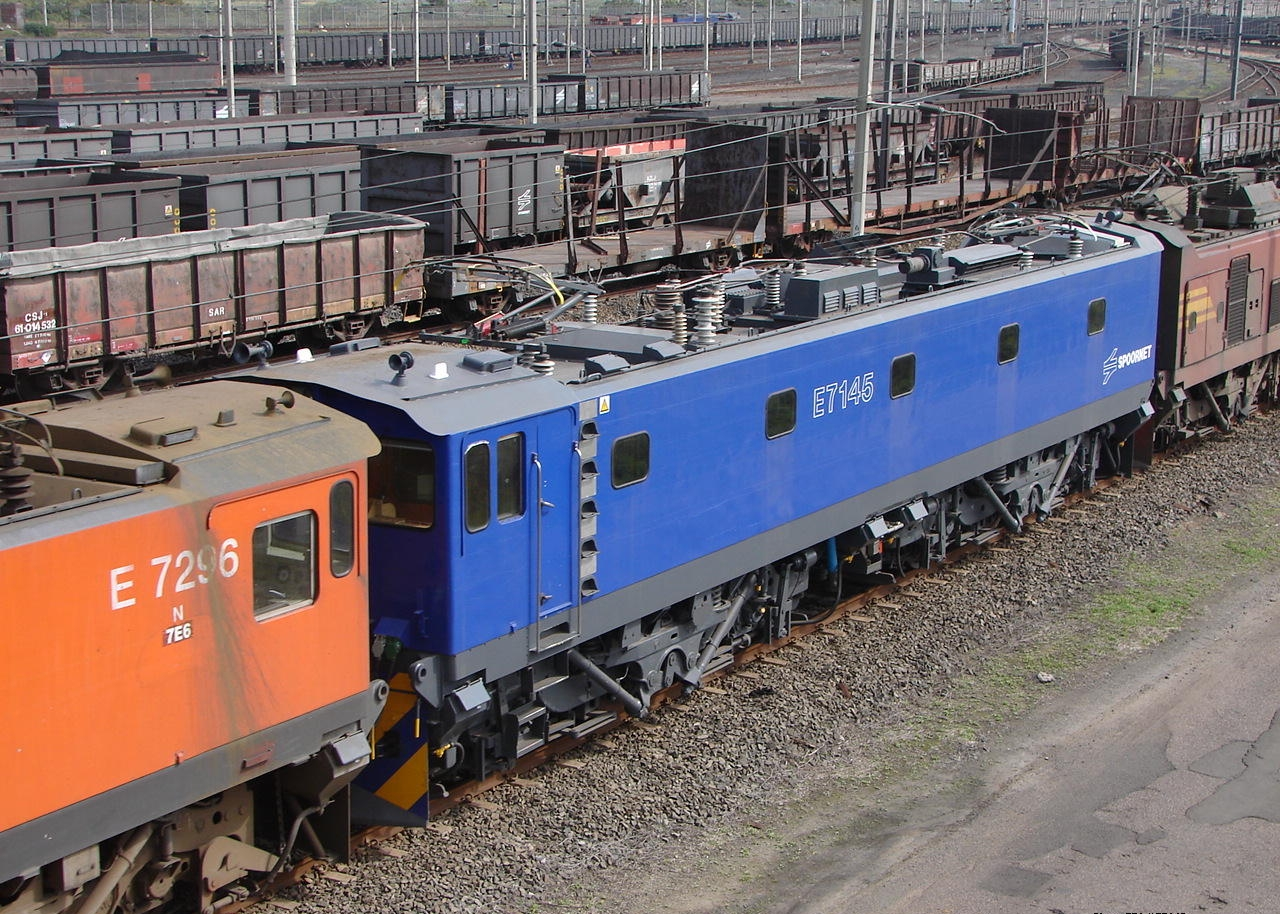
No. E7145 in Spoornet blue livery with outline numbers at Richards Bay, KwaZulu-Natal, 14 August 2007

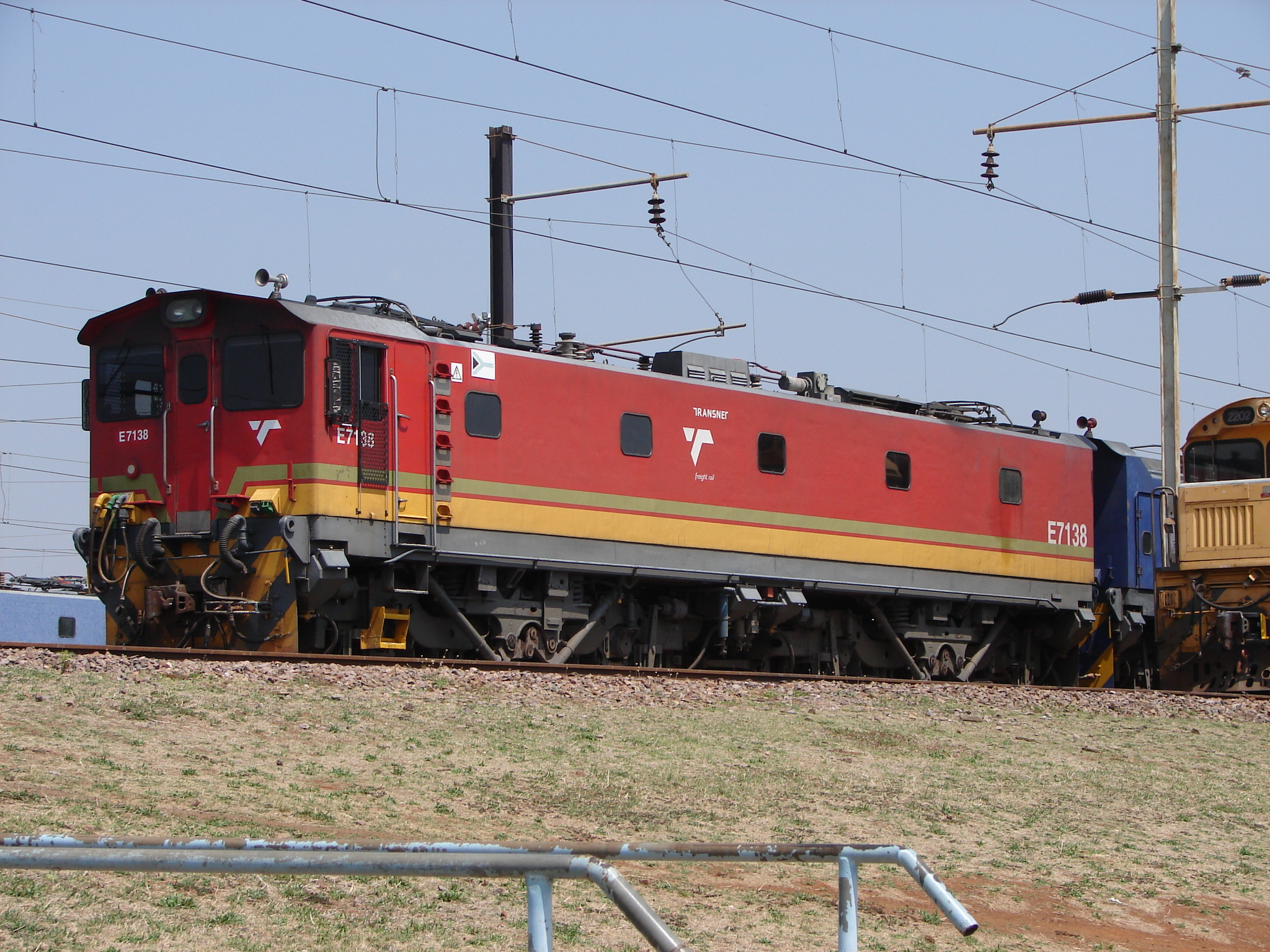
No. E7138 in Transnet Freight Rail livery, Pyramid South, Gauteng, 22 September 2015
