= DCD Group =

South African engineering company

- Industry: Manufacturing; Engineering
- Founded: 1946
- Headquarters: Vereeniging, South Africa
- Key people: Digby Glover (CEO)

DCD Group Ltd. (formerly DCD-Dorbyl Ltd.) is a South African manufacturer and engineering company focusing on the rail, mining, energy, defence, and marine sectors. It is based in Vereeniging, South Africa.

== History ==
DCD Group specializes in engineering projects, including rail and military vehicle engineering, roller manufacturing, marine engineering, and mine engineering.

DCD Protected Mobility manufactures the Husky VMMD, a counter-IED MRAP currently in use with the United States Army, the United States Marine Corps, and the South African Defence Force.

DCD Group was originally established in 1946 as DCD-Dorbyl Ltd., a merger of Dorman Long and Vanderbijl Engineering Corporation. It rebranded in 2012 as DCD Group Ltd.

In February 2010, Westinghouse and DCD-Dorbyl announced cooperation on creating a plant for building modules for AP1000 reactors.

The current CEO of DCD Group is Digby Glover.
