= South African Class 7E2, Series 1 =

Class of 25 South African electric locomotives

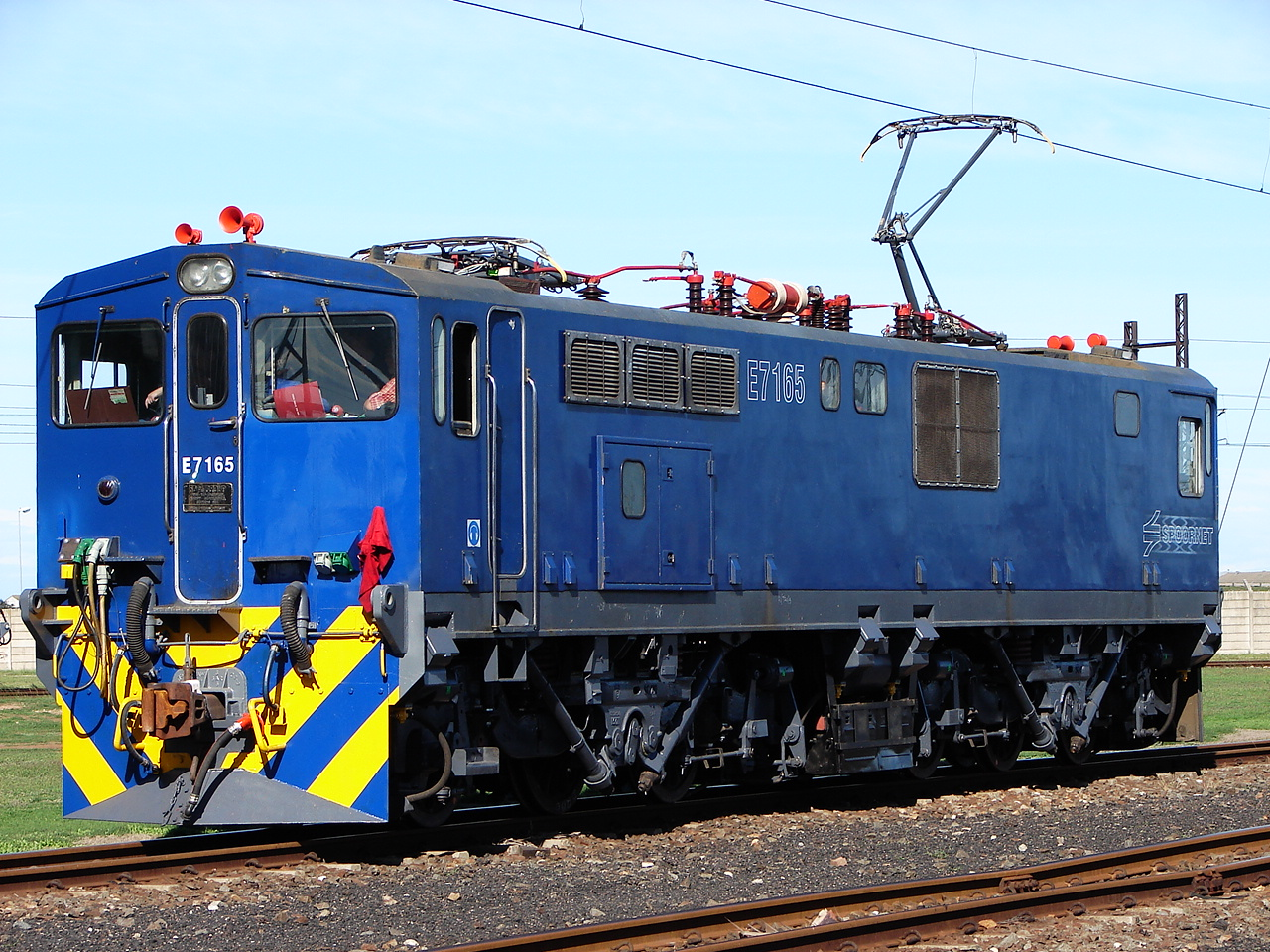
- E7165 at Swartkops, Port Elizabeth in April 2013
Type and origin
- Power type: Electric
- Designer: 50 ^{c}/s Group
- Builder: Union Carriage & Wagon
- Model: 50 ^{c}/s Group 7E2
- Build date: 1982
- Total produced: 25
Specifications
- Gauge: 1,067 mm (3 ft 6 in)
- Bogies: Co-Co
- Wheel diameter: 1.22 metres (4 ft 0 in)
- Wheelbase: 13.46 metres (44.2 ft)
  - Bogie: 4.06 metres (13.3 ft)
- Pivot centres: 10.20 metres (33.5 ft)
- Panto shoes: 10.20 metres (33.5 ft)
- Length
  - Over couplers: 18.47 metres (60.6 ft)
  - Over body: 17.50 metres (57.4 ft)
- Width: 2.90 metres (9 ft 6 in)
- Height
  - Pantograph: 4.20 metres (13.8 ft)
  - Body height: 3.94 metres (12.9 ft)
- Axle load: 21 tonnes (21 long tons; 23 short tons)
- Adhesive weight: 125.8 tonnes (123.8 long tons; 138.7 short tons)
- Loco weight: 125.8 tonnes (123.8 long tons; 138.7 short tons)
- Electric system/s: 25 kV AC 50 Hz catenary
- Current pickup(s): Pantographs
- Traction motors: Six MG-680
  - Rating 1 hour: 515 kW (691 hp)
  - Continuous: 500 kW (670 hp)
- Gear ratio: 20:117
- Loco brake: Air & Rheostatic
- Train brakes: Air & Vacuum
- Couplers: AAR knuckle
Performance figures
- Maximum speed: 88 km/h (55 mph)
- Power output
  - 1 hour: 3,090 kW (4,140 hp)
  - Continuous: 3,000 kW (4,000 hp)
- Tractive effort
  - Starting: 450 kN (100,000 lbf)
  - 1 hour: 319 kN (72,000 lbf)
  - Continuous: 300 kN (67,000 lbf)
Career
- Operators: South African Railways; Spoornet; Transnet Freight Rail
- Class: Class 7E2
- Number in class: 25
- Numbers: E7151-E7175
- Delivered: 1982
- First run: 1982

The South African Railways Class 7E2, Series 1 is an electric locomotive. South African Railways placed 25 Class 7E2, Series 1 electric locomotives with a Co-Co wheel arrangement in service in 1982.

== Manufacturer ==
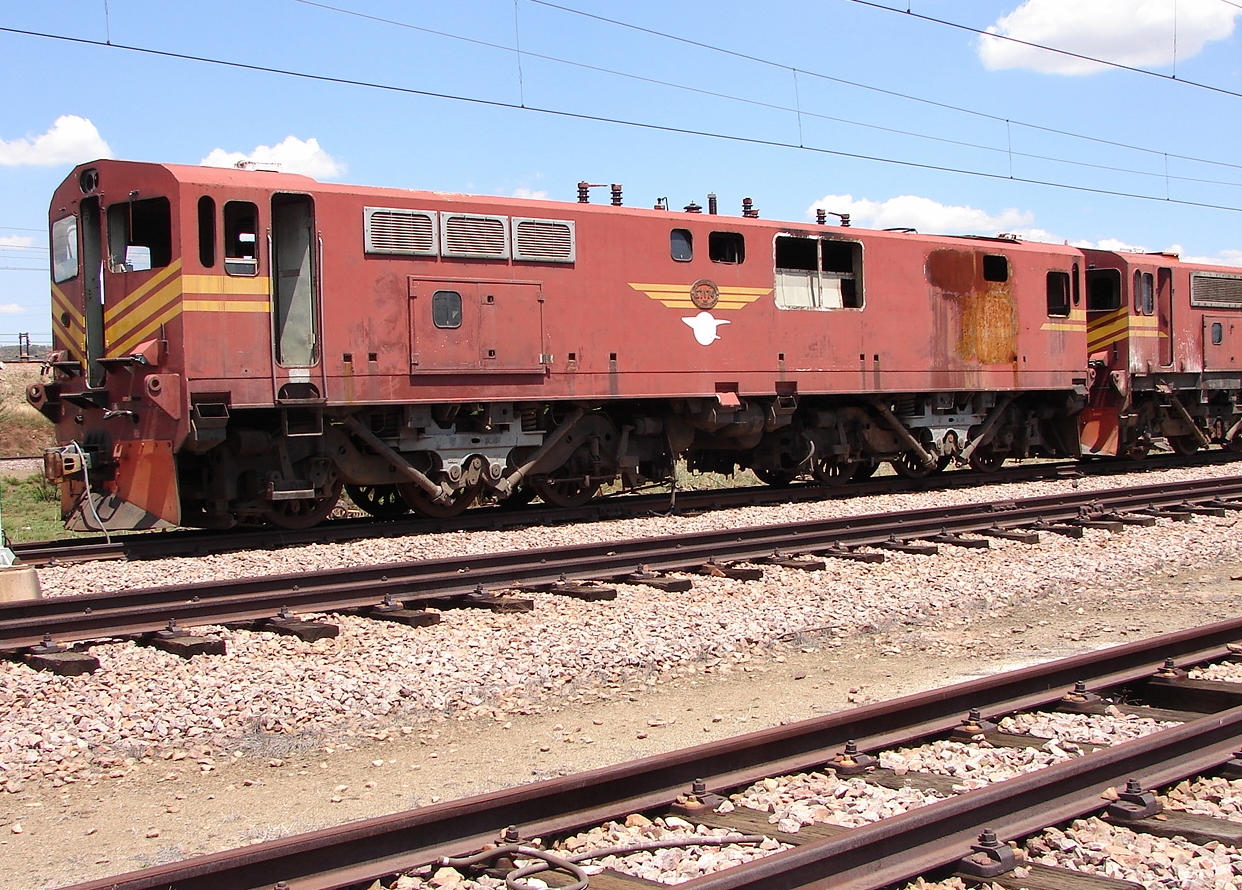
E7174 in SAR Gulf Red and whiskers livery at Pyramid South in October 2009

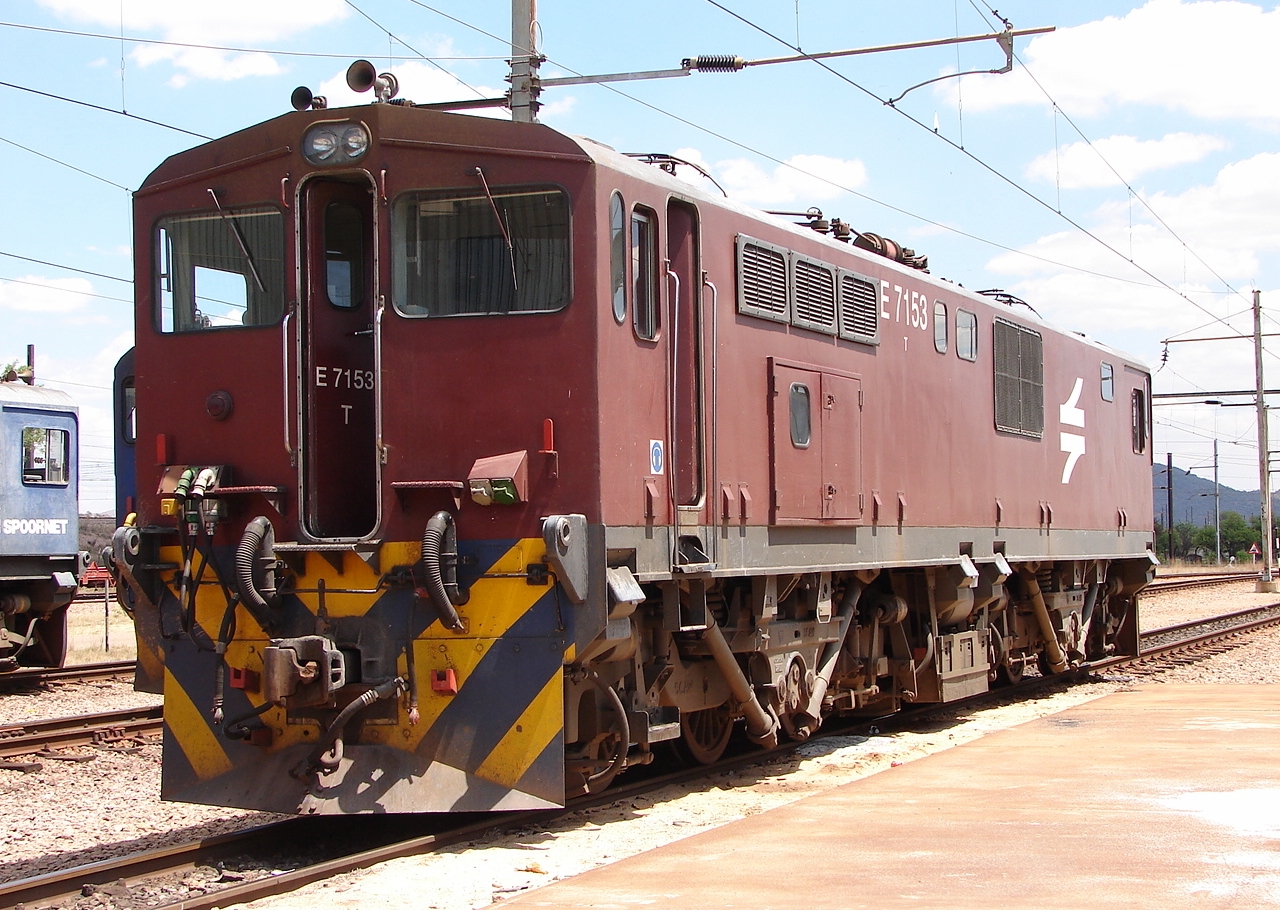
E7153 in Spoornet maroon livery at Pyramid South on 6 October 2009

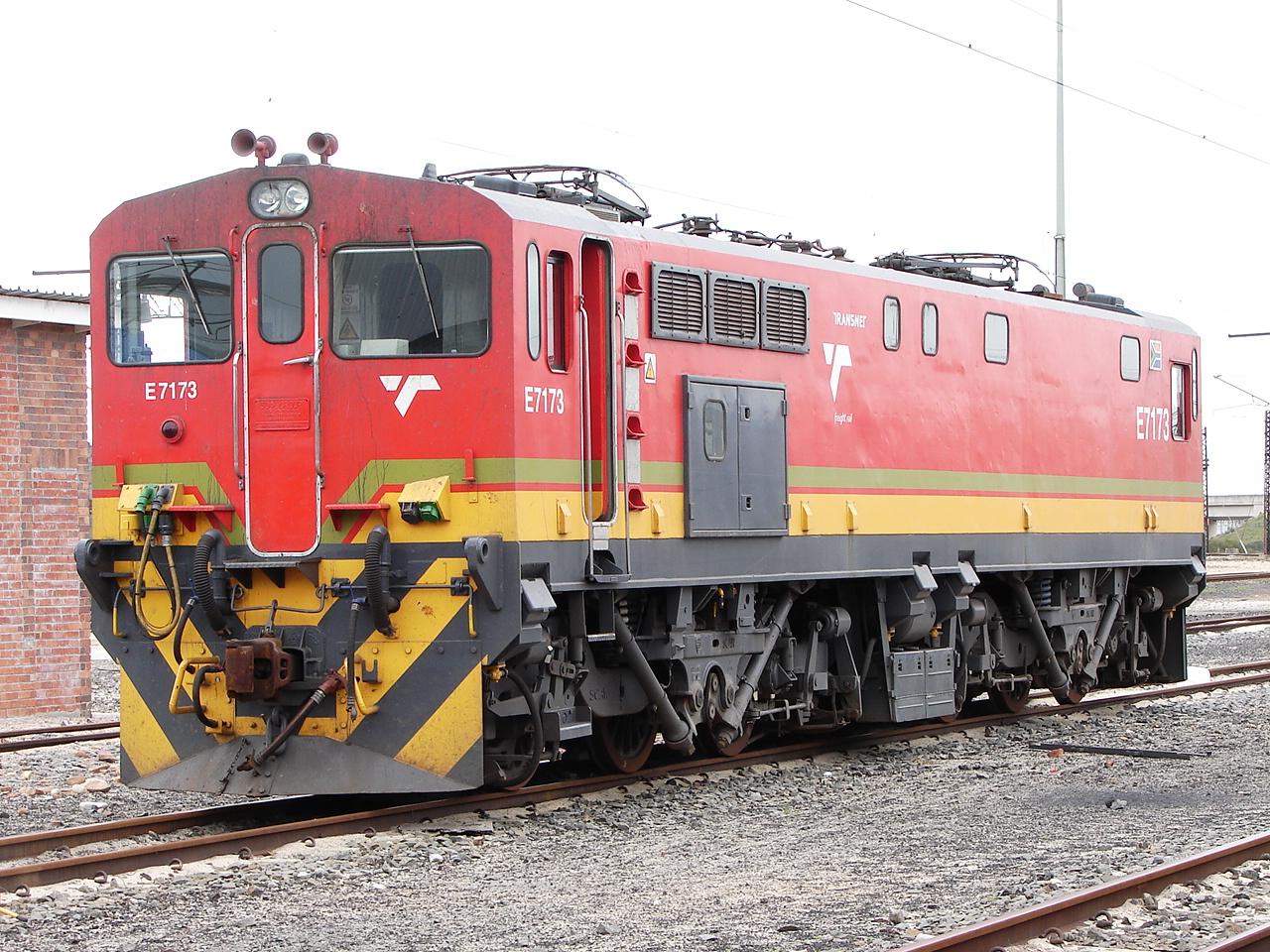
E7173 in Transnet Freight Rail livery at Swartkops in April 2013

The 25 kV AC Class 7E2, Series 1 electric locomotive was designed for the South African Railways by the 50 ^{c}/s Group, consisting of ACEC of Belgium, AEG-Telefunken and Siemens of Germany, Alsthom-Atlantique and Société MTE of France, and Brown, Boveri & Cie of Switzerland. The locomotives were built by Union Carriage & Wagon (UCW) in Nigel, Transvaal, which was the sub-contractor for mechanical components and assembly and delivered in 1982, numbered E7151 to E7175. UCW did not allocate builder's numbers to the locomotives it built for the SAR, but used the SAR unit numbers for their record keeping.

== Orientation ==
These dual cab locomotives have a roof access ladder on one side only, just to the right of the cab access door. The roof access ladder end is marked as the no. 2 end.

In visual appearance, the Class 7E2, Series 1 can be distinguished from the Series 2 by the absence of the vertical grilles on both sides just to the rear of the driver's window on Series 2 locomotives. Both series have a large grille to the right of centre on the side opposite the roof access ladder side, near roof level on Series 1 locomotives and low down near sill level on Series 2. The three grilles in line just to the rear of the side doors on Series 1 locomotives were replaced with a single long grille on Series 2 locomotives. Like the Class 7E, some of the Class 7E2, Series 1 locomotives have distinctive "eyebrow" rainwater beadings above their cab windscreens, but these were added post-delivery and were not installed on all the units.

== Characteristics ==
=== Brakes ===
The control of traction and rheostatic braking on the Class 7E2, Series 1 is by stepless solid-state electronics. The electrical equipment was designed for high power factor operation, obtained by a sector control method. Like the earlier South African Class 7E, these locomotives are equipped with thyristor technology from the 50 ^{c}/s Group.

=== Bogies ===
To reduce flange and rail wear, the bogies of the Class 7E2 have a shorter wheelbase than the Class 7E, 4.06 metres (13 feet 3.8 inches) instead of 4.40 metres (14 feet 5.2 inches).

Like the Class 7E, the Class 7E2 was built with sophisticated traction linkages on the bogies. Together with the locomotive's electronic wheel-slip detection system, these traction struts, mounted between the linkages on the bogies and the locomotive body and colloquially referred to as grasshopper legs, ensure the maximum transfer of power to the rails without causing wheel-slip by reducing the adhesion of the leading bogie and increasing that of the trailing bogie by as much as 15% upon starting off.

=== Pantographs ===
As on the Class 7E, the locomotive's pantograph contact shoe centres are directly above the bogie pivot centres to reduce the possibility of pantograph hookups on catenary in sharp curves, such as in turnouts, as a result of sideways movement of the pantograph in relation to the overhead wire.

== Service ==
The Class 7E2, Series 1 was placed in service on the northern 25 kV routes from Pyramid South north of Pretoria via Warmbad to Pietersburg and via Brits and Rustenburg to Thabazimbi. In 2012, as more of the new Class 19E locomotives became available, some were transferred to the Eastern Cape where they augmented the existing Class 7E fleet working out of Port Elizabeth via De Aar to Kimberley and Beaufort West.

== Liveries ==
All the Class 7E2, Series 1 locomotives were delivered in the SAR red oxide livery with signal red buffer beams and cowcatchers, yellow whiskers and with the number plates on the sides mounted on three-stripe yellow wings. In the 1990s some of them were repainted in the Spoornet orange livery with a yellow and blue chevron pattern on the buffer beams and cowcatchers. Some later received the Spoornet maroon livery. In the late 1990s most were repainted in the Spoornet blue livery with either solid or outline numbers on the long hood sides. After 2008 in the Transnet Freight Rail (TFR) era, some were repainted in the TFR red, green and yellow livery.
