= South African Class 7E =

South African electric locomotive

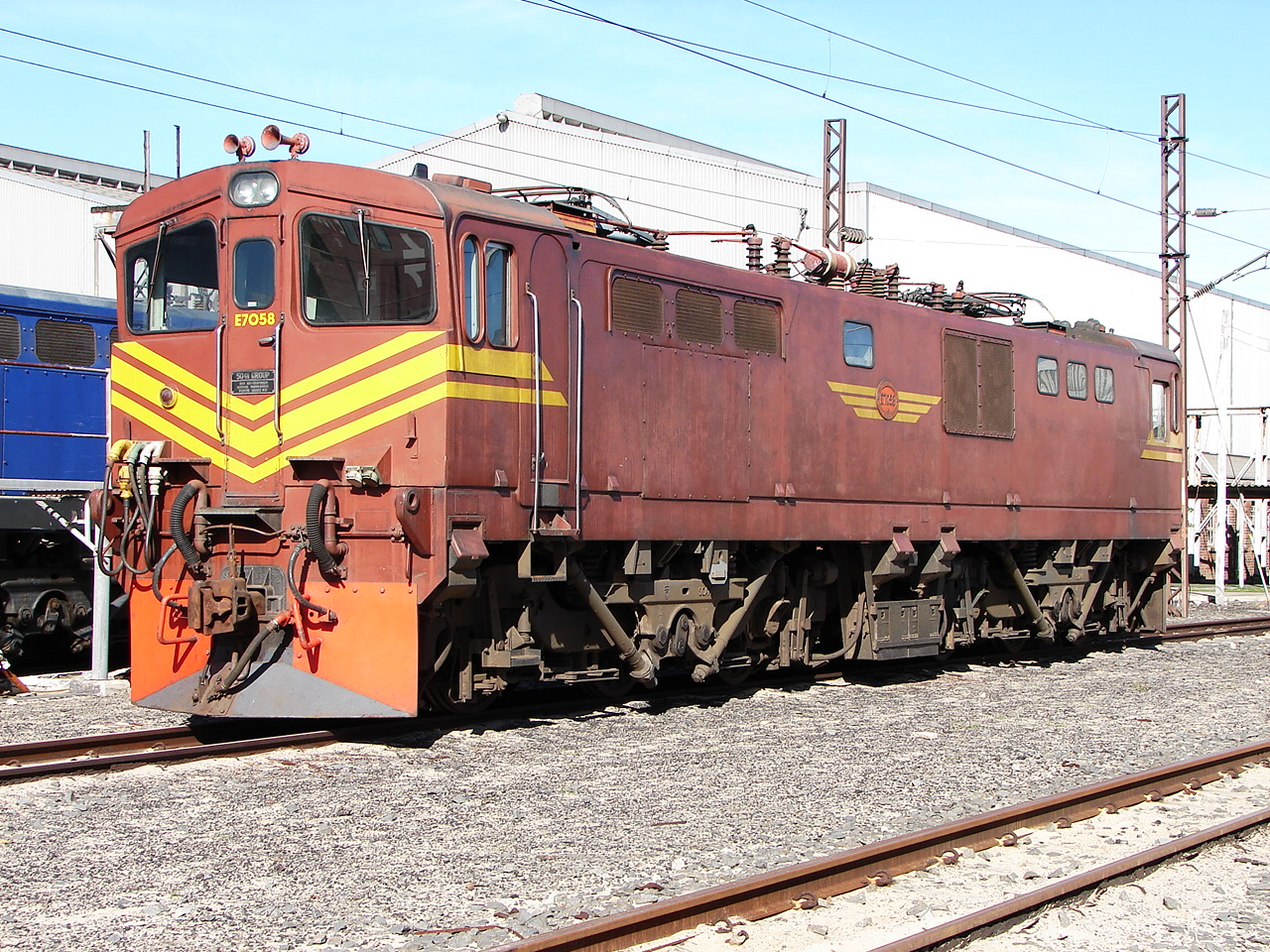
- E7058 at Swartkops, Port Elizabeth in April 2013
Type and origin
- Power type: Electric
- Designer: 50 ^{c}/s Group
- Builder: Union Carriage & Wagon
- Model: 50 ^{c}/s Group 7E
- Build date: 1978-1979
- Total produced: 100
Specifications
- Gauge: 1,067 mm (3 ft 6 in)
- Bogies: Co-Co
- Wheel diameter: 1.22 metres (4 ft 0 in)
- Wheelbase: 13.80 metres (45.3 ft)
  - Bogie: 4.40 metres (14.4 ft)
- Pivot centres: 10.20 metres (33.5 ft)
- Panto shoes: 10.20 metres (33.5 ft)
- Length
  - Over couplers: 18.47 metres (60.6 ft)
  - Over body: 17.54 metres (57.5 ft)
- Width: 2.90 metres (9 ft 6 in)
- Height
  - Pantograph: 4.20 metres (13.8 ft)
  - Body height: 3.94 metres (12.9 ft)
- Axle load: 21 tonnes (21 long tons; 23 short tons)
- Adhesive weight: 123.5 tonnes (121.5 long tons; 136.1 short tons)
- Loco weight: 123.5 tonnes (121.5 long tons; 136.1 short tons)
- Electric system/s: 25 kV AC 50 Hz catenary
- Current pickup(s): Pantographs
- Traction motors: Six MG 680
  - Rating 1 hour: 540 kW (720 hp)
  - Continuous: 500 kW (670 hp)
- Gear ratio: 20:117
- Loco brake: Air & Rheostatic
- Train brakes: Air & Vacuum
- Couplers: AAR knuckle
Performance figures
- Maximum speed: 100 km/h (62 mph)
- Power output
  - 1 hour: 3,240 kW (4,340 hp)
  - Continuous: 3,000 kW (4,000 hp)
- Tractive effort
  - Starting: 450 kN (100,000 lbf)
  - 1 hour: 319 kN (72,000 lbf)
  - Continuous: 300 kN (67,000 lbf)
- Brakeforce: 210 kN (47,000 lbf)
Career
- Operators: South African Railways; Spoornet; Transnet Freight Rail; PRASA
- Class: Class 7E
- Number in class: 100
- Numbers: E7001-E7100
- Nicknames: MacGyver
- Delivered: 1978-1979
- First run: 1978

The South African Railways Class 7E is an electric locomotive. South African Railways placed 100 Class 7E electric locomotives with a Co-Co wheel arrangement in service in 1978/79. They were the first 25 kV AC locomotives to enter service in South Africa.

== Manufacturer ==
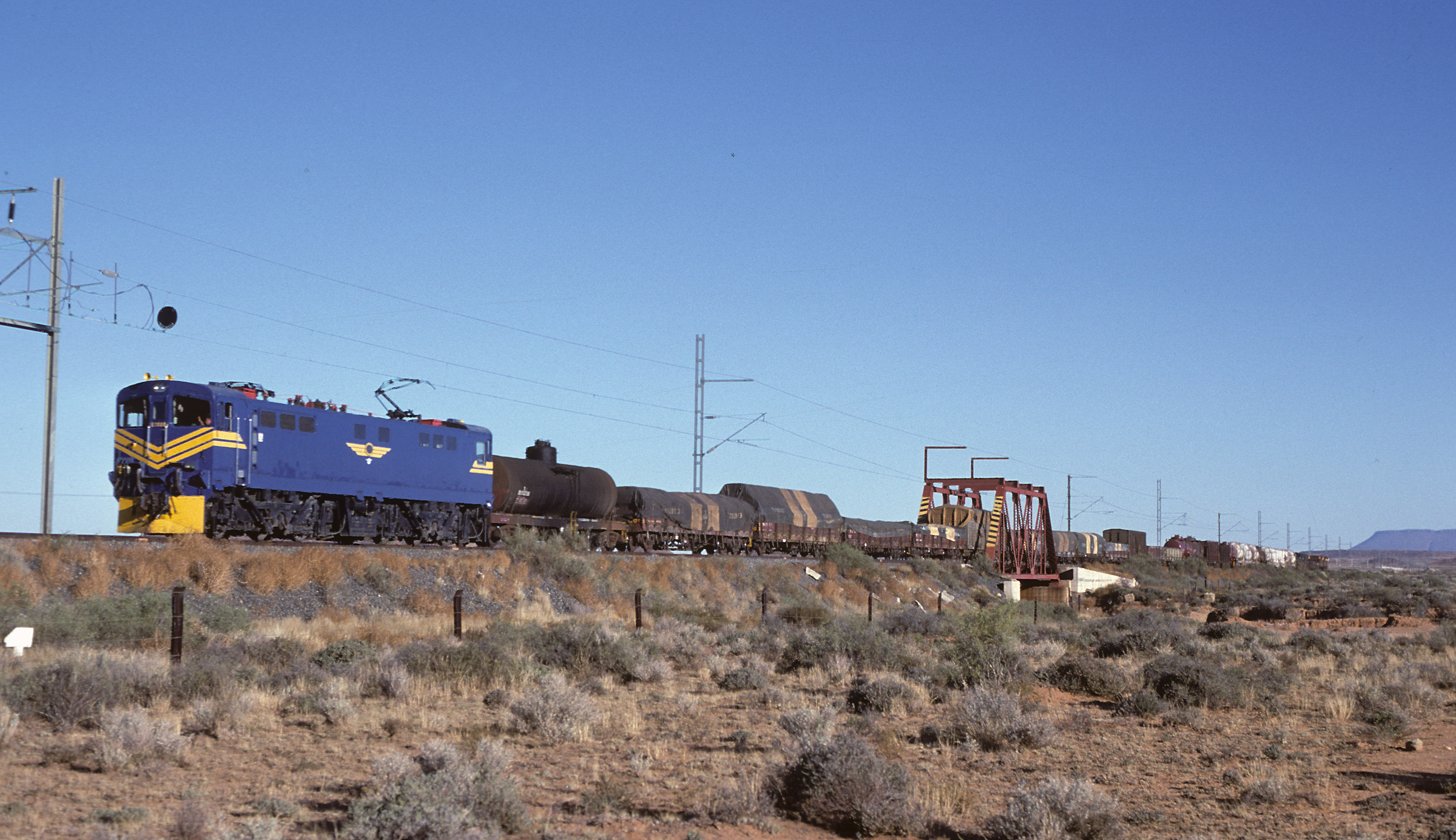
E7008 in Blue Train livery near Die Put in May 1985

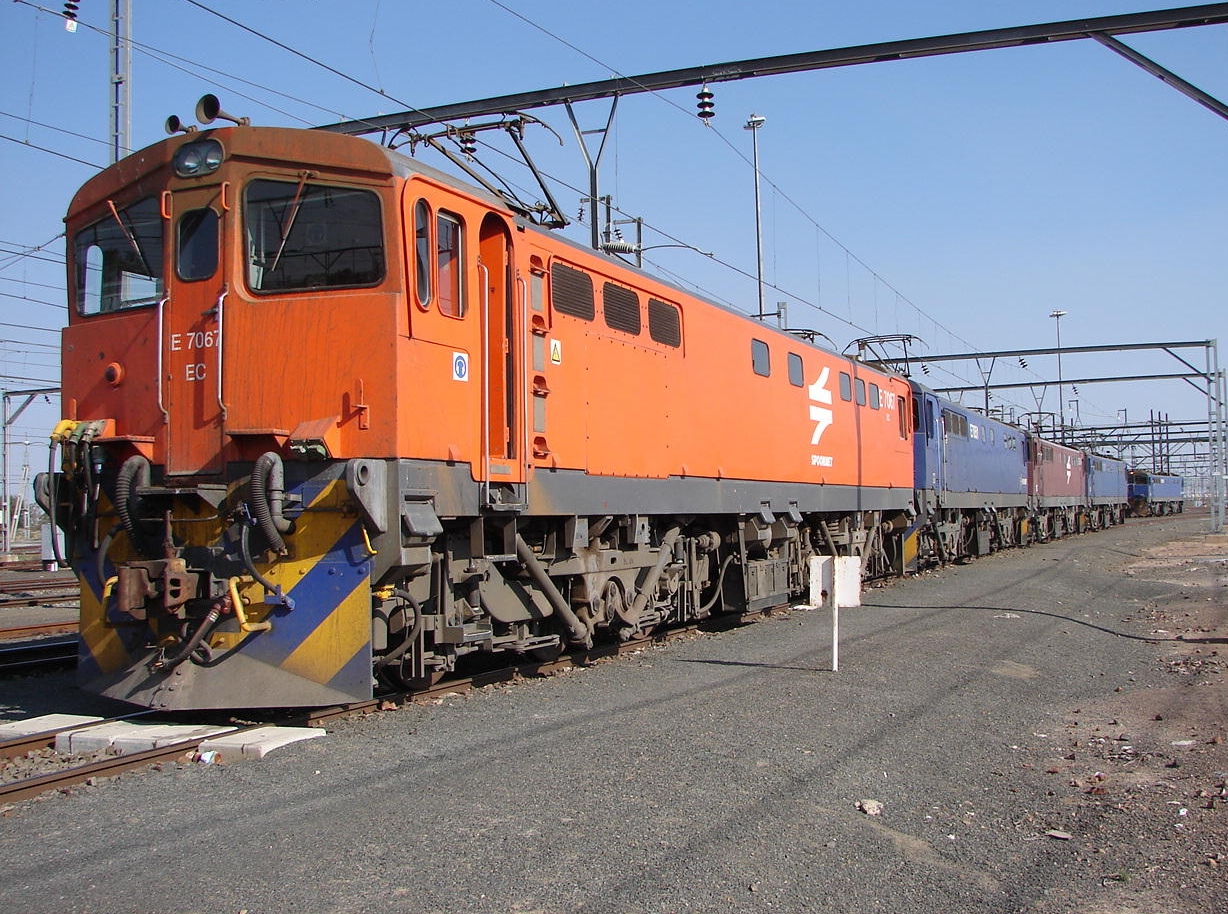
E7067 in Spoornet orange livery at Beaufort West in August 2007

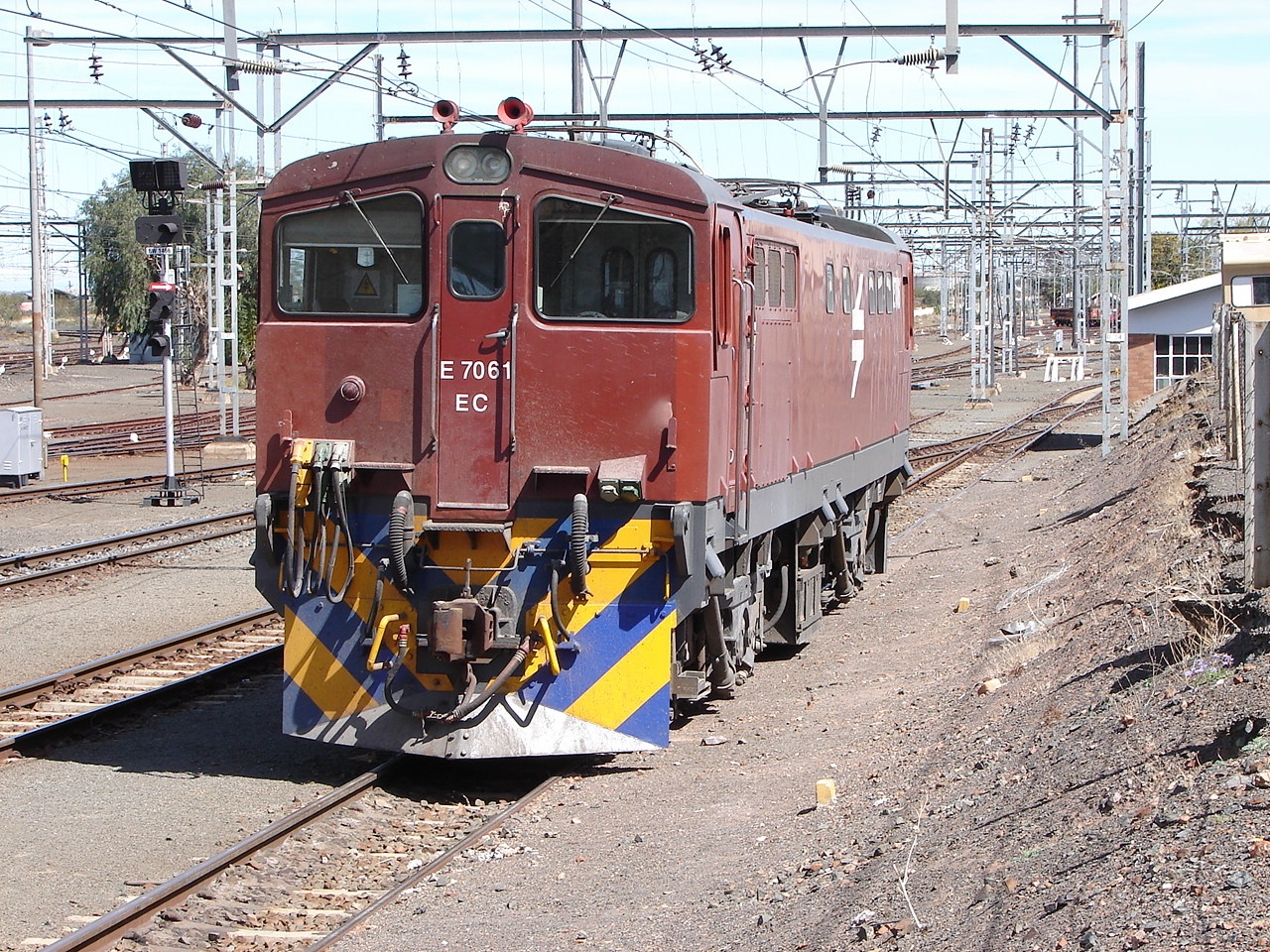
E7061 in Spoornet maroon livery at Beaufort West in September 2009

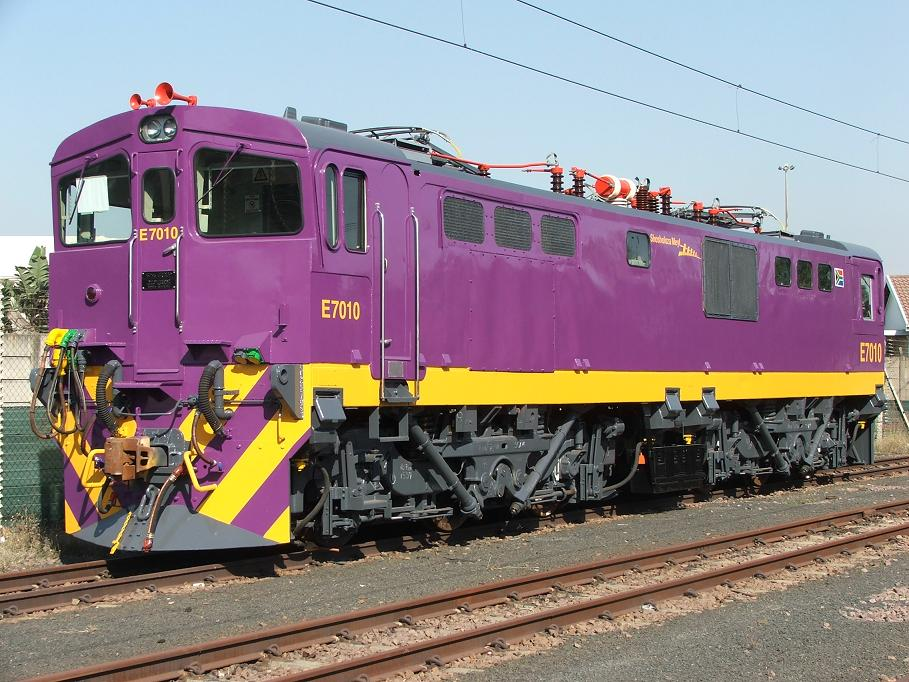
No. E7010 in PRASA’s Shosholoza Meyl livery at the Edwin Swales shops, Durban in June 2010

The 25 kV AC Class 7E electric locomotive was designed for the South African Railways (SAR) by the 50 ^{c}/s Group, consisting of ACEC of Belgium, AEG-Telefunken and Siemens of Germany, Alsthom-Atlantique and Société MTE of France, and Brown, Boveri & Cie of Switzerland. The locomotives were built by Union Carriage & Wagon (UCW) in Nigel, Transvaal, which was the sub-contractor for mechanical components and assembly.

One hundred Class 7E locomotives were delivered in 1978 and 1979, numbered in the range from E7001 to E7100. Beginning with the Class 7E, the SAR numbering practice for electric locomotives was changed to make the class number a part of the locomotive’s number. From the Class 1E through to the last of the Class 6E1 series of locomotives, all electric locomotives were numbered sequentially in the number range from E1 to E2185, with only twelve numbers in the range skipped over the years.

UCW did not allocate builder’s numbers to the locomotives it built for the SAR, but used the SAR unit numbers for their record keeping.

== Orientation ==
These dual cab locomotives have a roof access ladder on one side only, just to the right of the cab access door. The roof access ladder end is marked as the no. 2 end.

Judging from early photographs of Class 7E locomotives, the distinctive "eyebrow" rainwater beadings above the cab windscreens were added post-delivery.

== Characteristics ==
=== Electric equipment ===
Control of traction and rheostatic braking on the Class 7E is by stepless solid-state electronics. The electrical equipment was designed for high power factor operation, obtained by a sector control method. These were the first South African AC electric locomotives with thyristor technology from the 50 ^{c}/s Group.

=== Bogies ===
The Class 7E was built with sophisticated traction linkages on the bogies, similar to the bogie design which was introduced on the Class 6E1 in 1969. Together with the locomotive's electronic wheel slip detection system, these traction struts, mounted between the linkages on the bogies and the locomotive body and colloquially referred to as grasshopper legs, ensure the maximum transfer of power to the rails without causing wheel slip by reducing the traction force of the leading bogie and increasing that of the trailing bogie by as much as 15% upon starting off.

=== Pantographs ===
The Class 7E was the first SAR electric locomotive on which the pantograph contact shoe centres were located directly above the bogie pivot centres. This reduces the risk of pantograph hookups on catenary in sharp curves such as in turnouts as a result of sideways movement of the pantograph in relation to the overhead wire.

== Service ==
The Class 7E was designed primarily for goods train service on South Africa’s 25 kV AC electrified lines. Until 1978, all electrified mainline routes in South Africa used 3 kV DC, but from that year all new mainline electrification projects bar one used 25 kV AC. The one exception is the 50 kV AC Sishen-Saldanha line. There are four isolated 25 kV AC routes.

- From Pyramid South to Pietersburg and via Brits to Thabazimbi.
- From Ermelo to the Richards Bay Coal Terminal at Richards Bay.
- From Port Elizabeth to De Aar and from there northward to Kimberley and southward to Beaufort West.
- From East London to Springfontein in the Free State.

When it was electrified, the well known double line "racetrack" between Kimberley and De Aar was single-lined and the section was signalled for single-track centralised traffic control (CTC) with long crossing loops. Here the Class 7E finally replaced South Africa’s last big Class 25NC steam locomotives. The second set of tracks were left in place, but unelectrified and isolated from the electrified track. In anticipation of increased ore traffic to the Eastern Cape from Hotazel, north-west of Kimberley, work on electrifying the second track commenced in July 2008.

The Class 7E was initially placed in service on the coal line from Ermelo to Richards Bay. When later model 25 kV AC locomotives were acquired, a few Class 7E locomotives went to the Pyramid South and East London lines, but the majority were transferred to the Cape Midland system to work goods and passenger traffic from Kimberley via De Aar to either Port Elizabeth or Beaufort West.

== Regional co-operation ==
A 30c postage stamp, depicting a pair of Class 7E locomotives hauling an ore train, was one of a set of four commemorative postage stamps which were issued by the South African Post Office on 15 February 1990. The theme illustrated interdependence and regional co-operation in Southern Africa and on this stamp, the integrated railway systems which stretched from Cape Town in the south to as far north as Dar es Salaam in Tanzania. The artwork and stamp design was by the noted stamp designer and artist A.H. Barrett.

== Liveries ==
The whole series was delivered in the SAR Gulf Red livery with signal red cowcatchers, yellow whiskers and with the number plates on the sides mounted on three-stripe yellow wings. When the section from Kimberley to Beaufort West was electrified, six Class 7E locomotives, numbers E7004 to E7009, were painted blue with yellow whiskers for use with the Blue Train on that section. In the 1990s many of the units began to be repainted in the Spoornet orange livery with a yellow and blue chevron pattern on the cowcatchers. Several later received the Spoornet maroon livery. In the late 1990s many were repainted in the Spoornet blue livery with solid numbers on the sides while just as many, including the former Blue Train units, received the Spoornet blue livery with outline numbers on the sides. In the Passenger Rail Agency of South Africa (PRASA) era after 2008, at least two were repainted in the Shosholoza Meyl purple livery.
