= Port of Richards Bay =

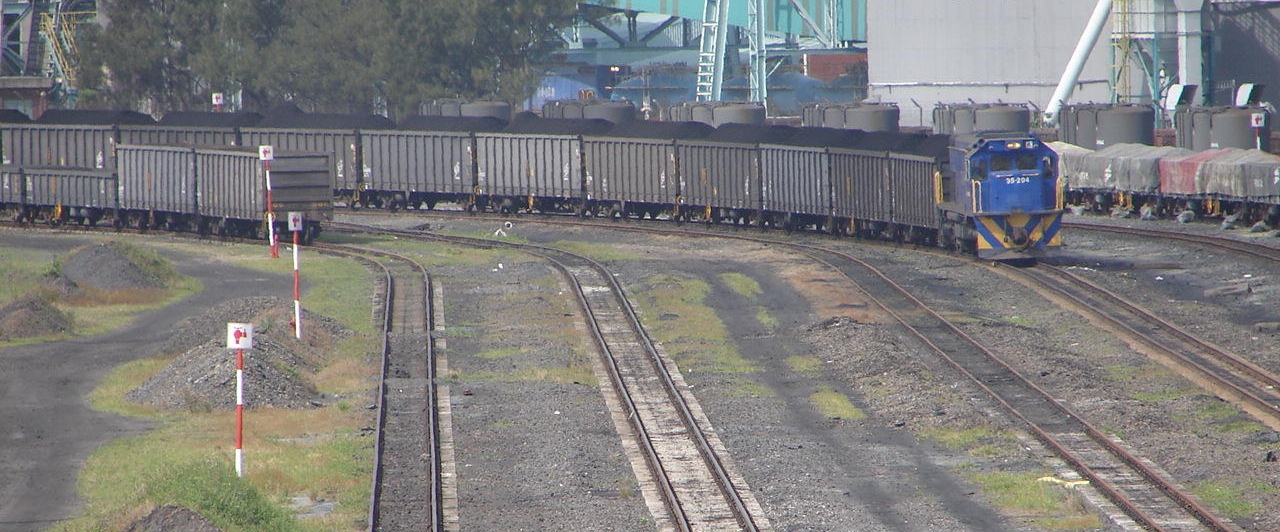
- The railyard at Richards Bay, 14 August 2007

- Location in South Africa

Location
- Country: South Africa
- Location: Richards Bay
- Coordinates: 28.818°S 32.052°E
- UN/LOCODE: ZARCB

Details
- Type of harbour: Dry bulk port
- Land area: 276 hectares (680 acres)
- No. of berths: 6

Statistics
- Annual cargo tonnage: 91 million annually

The Port of Richards Bay is located in Richards Bay harbour on the Indian Ocean coast of South Africa, and contains the Richards Bay Coal Terminal (RBCT) which is the largest coal export facility in Africa. (Note: The Chinese port of Qinhuangdao maintains the largest coal exporting terminal in the world, at 209 Million tons compared to Richards Bay with 91 Million tons.)

Although originally built to handle coal exports, the port has become South Africa's premier bulk port, handling other dry bulk in addition to coal, as well as liquid bulk and breakbulk cargoes. It is also South Africa's most modern port.

== History ==
The idea for a new harbour north of Durban began as far back as 1902 when a Cathcart W. Methen, Harbour Engineer, Durban, conducted a survey and advised the Natal Colony government in 1903, that Richards Bay would be a better choice than St Lucia.

The idea was again revised in 1921 when a proposed harbour was investigated by a group of engineers at Kosi or Sodwana Bay's. Sodwana's suitability was again investigated in 1922 by Sir George Buchanan. The two former bays were again investigated in 1923, this time by Jan Smuts. The idea for a northern harbour would again be revisited in the 1950s when Prime Minister D.F. Malan visited by air reconnaissance. By 1965, the then Minister of Transport Ben Schoeman decided after visiting Kosi and Sodwana Bay's, that Richards Bay would be the best choice. Four reasons were given for the choice. It had a protected bay; the hard material was at a depth allowing the creation of a deep bay; the ability to integrate the existing railway infrastructure and a shorter rail distance to the industrialised Transvaal interior.

In 1967, surveys began of the 3,050 ha lagoon. Aerial photography took place, off-shore soundings were made by the South African Navy's hydrographical department while the Council for Scientific and Industrial Research (CSIR) studied the coastal morphology, collected data on wave heights, directions, tides, currents, sediment transport and studies on river discharge into the lagoon. Three rivers flowed into the lagoon, the Umhlatuzi, the Nsezi and the Manzamyana with the depth of the water in the lagoon being around a metre. The ground below the lagoon water was very soft making proposed dredging easier with the hard rock at a depth making the proposed port a deep water harbour. The existing sea entrance to the lagoon was found to be a natural underwater gorge that was filled with loose material and so made it ideal as a channel for ships to enter the proposed harbour if two breakwaters were built.

Despite no harbour or facilities, in January 1969, earthworks began for the building of the Alusaf Smelter, the country's first aluminium smelter. 2,100,000 m^{3} of soil was brought into the swampy site and 40 km of piles driven into the ground. Concrete pouring began in June 1969 with Aluisse the project managers, Roberts for the construction and Dorman Long the steelworks. It would open on 1 April 1971 with initial processing capacity set at 52,000 tons and 300,000 tons if expanded. Alumina was imported from Australia and transported by rail to Richards Bay.

In the middle of 1971, boring tests indicated poor ground in certain areas of the proposed harbour that necessitated changes to the location of some infrastructure. By November 1971 the design and construction tenders were released and closed in March 1972. May 1972 saw the South African parliament passed an Act that authorised the construction of the harbour. Ten tenders were received and a contract was awarded in May 1972 to a Dutch, Belgian and German consortium worth R108,606,402.50 for a period of five years. The first stage of development was the construction of quay-walls, to eventually berth bulk-carriers of up to 250,000 tons dw, with the completion deadline being April 1976.

The Transvaal Coal Owners Association proposed to export coal of 9.1 million tons from the Eastern Transvaal through the new port to Japan. The railway infrastructure needed upgrading or new lines built. The current rail line between Ermelo and Vryheid was upgraded and a new 90 km line from Broodsnyersplaas and the coalfields to Ermelo was built. The third main upgrade, was a new rail line from Vryheid to Empangeni, just outside Richards Bay, which would 210 km in length, with 10.5 km of tunnelling and 67 bridges or viaducts over several rivers including one over the Umfolozi River of a 39.6 m span.

== Coal terminal ==
=== Location ===
The Richards Bay Coal Terminal is positioned at one of the world's deep sea ports, and is able to handle large ships and subsequent large volumes.

As such, it has gained a reputation for operating efficiently and reliably.

The 276-hectare (680-acre) site currently boasts a quay 2.2 kilometres long with six berths and four ship loaders. Currently, the terminal has a storage capacity of 8.2 million tons of coal and is serviced by seven stacker reclaimers, two stackers and a reclaimer.

=== Capacity ===
In September 2006, RBCT set a new world record by loading and exporting 409,809 tons of coal in a 24-hour period at an annualised rate of 149.17 million tons per annum (Mt/a). Potential throughput is to reach 91 million tons a year by the first half of 2009.

In 2007 annual throughput was 66.12 million tons, despite a capacity of 76 million tons. It was largely due to rail deliveries failing to reach expectations.

== Expansion ==
RBCT commenced its Phase V expansion project in September 2006, which was completed in May 2010 and rose the throughput to the current capacity. Discussion about available export capacity to emerging black coal miners in South Africa is still going on. Therefore, Transnet and Grindrod started to build up coal export capacity through the Richards Bay Terminal (RBT), the dry bulk terminal of Richards Bay. The capacity of this facility will be increased to 4.5 million tons a year, which will give together with 4 million ton capacity reserved in the RBCT a total capacity of 9.5 million tons a year, which should be sufficient to cover the export needs of the black miners in the next years.

In January 2012, the Swazilink rail project was announced, which would remove general freight traffic from the Richards Bay line and allow more coal trains to Richards Bay Coal Terminal. Completion is foreseen for 2019 or 2020.
