= South African Class 35-200 =

Type of diesel-electric locomotive

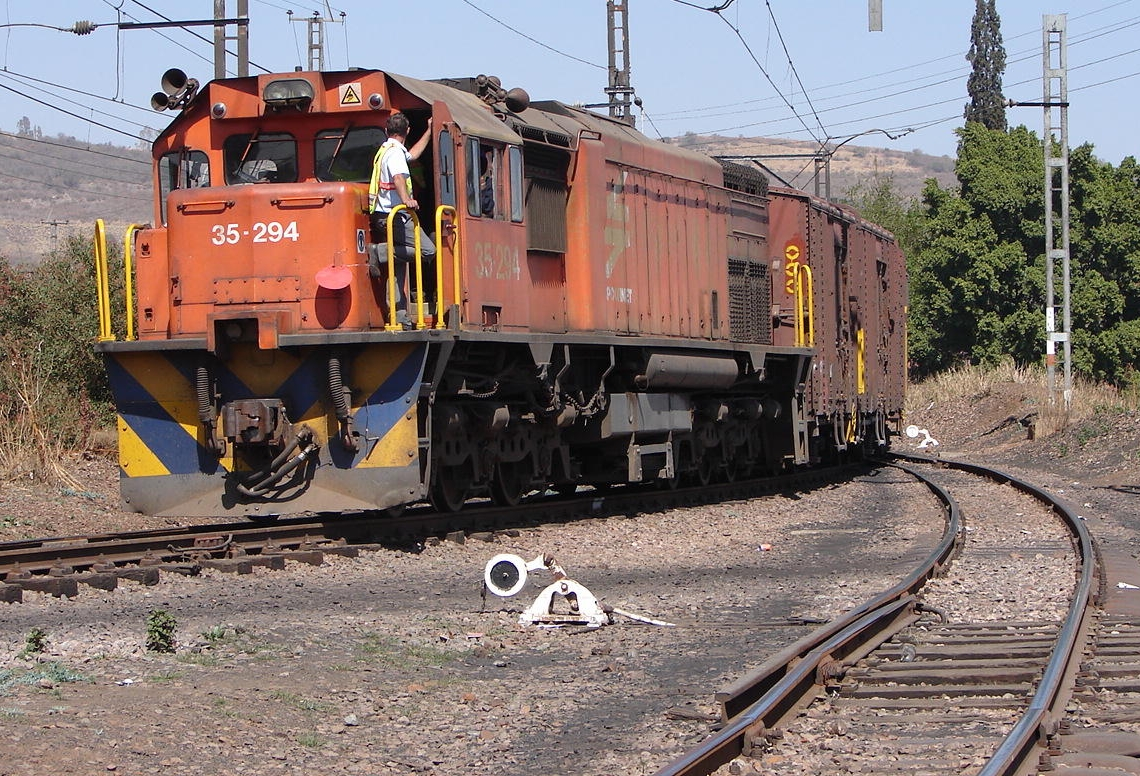
- No. 35-294 at Electro, Pretoria West, 21 August 2007
Type and origin
- Power type: Diesel-electric
- Designer: General Motors Electro-Motive Division
- Builder: General Motors Electro-Motive Division; General Motors South Africa
- Serial number: GM-EMD 712981-713005; GMSA 100-1 to 100-75, 102-1 to 102-50, 107-1
- Model: GM-EMD GT18MC
- Build date: 1974-1976
- Total produced: 151
Specifications
- Configuration
  - AAR: C-C
  - UIC: Co′Co′
  - Commonwealth: Co+Co
- Gauge: 3 ft 6 in (1,067 mm) Cape gauge
- Wheel diameter: 915 mm (36 in)
- Wheelbase: 12,675 mm (41 ft 7 in)
  - Axle spacing (Asymmetrical): 1-2: 1,562 mm (5 ft 1 in); 2-3: 1,740 mm (5 ft 9 in)
  - Bogie: 3,302 mm (10 ft 10 in)
- Pivot centres: 9,627 mm (31 ft 7 in)
- Length
  - Over couplers: 16,485 mm (54 ft 1 in)
- Width: 2,819 mm (9 ft 3 in)
- Height: 3,924 mm (12 ft 10 in)
- Axle load: 13,720 kg (30,250 lb)
- Adhesive weight: 82,320 kg (181,480 lb)
- Loco weight: 82,320 kg (181,480 lb) max
- Fuel type: Diesel
- Fuel capacity: 3,400 L (750 imp gal; 900 US gal)
- Prime mover: EMD 8-645E3
- RPM range: 250-900
  - RPM low idle: 250
  - RPM idle: 315
  - Maximum RPM: 900
- Engine type: V8 2-stroke diesel
- Aspiration: GM-EMD E-8 turbocharger
- Displacement: 10.57 litres (645.0 cu in)
- Generator: 8 pole GM-EMD D25
- Traction motors: Six GM-EMD D29CCBT DC 4 pole
  - Rating 1 hour: 485A
  - Continuous: 450A @ 15 km/h (9.3 mph)
- Cylinders: 8
- Gear ratio: 57:16
- MU working: 4 maximum
- Loco brake: 28-LAV-1 with vigilance control
- Train brakes: Gardner-Denver ADJV-8400 compressor/exhauster
- Air tank cap.: 800 L (180 imp gal; 210 US gal)
- Compressor: 0.021 m^{3}/s (0.74 cu ft/s)
- Exhauster: 0.098 m^{3}/s (3.5 cu ft/s)
- Couplers: AAR knuckle (SASKOP DS)
Performance figures
- Maximum speed: 100 km/h (62 mph)
- Power output
  - Starting: 1,195 kW (1,603 hp)
  - Continuous: 1,065 kW (1,428 hp)
- Tractive effort
  - Starting: 201 kN (45,000 lbf) @ 25% adhesion
  - Continuous: 161 kN (36,000 lbf) @ 19 km/h (12 mph)
- Factor of adh.
  - Starting: 25%
  - Continuous: 20%
- Brakeforce: 65% ratio @ 345 kPa (50.0 psi)
- Dynamic brake peak effort: 138 kN (31,000 lbf) @ 28 km/h (17 mph)
Career
- Operators: South African Railways; AECI, Modderfontein; Spoornet; Transnet Freight Rail; PRASA; CamRail; Sudan Railways; Ferrovia Centro Atlântico; Ferrovia Sul Atlântico
- Class: Class 35-200
- Number in class: 151
- Numbers: SAR 35-201 to 35-350, AECI 2
- Delivered: 1974-1976
- First run: 1974

The South African Railways Class 35-200 of 1974 is a diesel-electric locomotive.

Between November 1974 and August 1976, the South African Railways placed 150 Class 35-200 General Motors Electro-Motive Division type GT18MC diesel-electric locomotives in service. In 1975, one more Class 35-200 locomotive was built for AECI in Modderfontein, Johannesburg.

== Manufacturer ==
The Class 35-200 type GT18MC diesel-electric locomotive was designed for the South African Railways (SAR) by General Motors Electro-Motive Division (GM-EMD). The first 25 units were built by GM-EMD and imported, delivered by November 1974 and numbered in the range from 35-201 to 35-225. The remainder were built in two batches by General Motors South Africa (GMSA) in Port Elizabeth, with 75 units being delivered between 1974 and 1975, numbered in the range from 35-226 to 35-300, and another fifty between 1975 and August 1976, numbered in the range from 35-301 to 35-350.

While the first GMSA batch was being built, an order for one Class 35-200 GT18MC locomotive was received from AECI in Modderfontein, Johannesburg. Since it required urgent delivery, no. 35-244 (works no. 100-19) from the SAR order was delivered to AECI and became their no. 2, named "A.J. de Beer". The AECI locomotive, works no. 107-1, then went to the SAR as no. 35-244.

== Class 35 series ==
=== GE and GM-EMD designs ===
The Class 35 locomotive family consists of five sub-classes, the General Electric (GE) Classes 35-000 and 35-400 and the GM-EMD Classes 35-200, 35-600 and 35-800. Both manufacturers also produced locomotives for the South African Classes 33, 34 and 36.

=== Distinguishing features ===
The GM-EMD Class 35-200 and 35-600 are visually indistinguishable from each other.

== Service ==
=== South African Railways ===
The Class 35 family is South Africa’s standard branchline diesel-electric locomotive. GM-EMD Class 35-200s were designed for light rail conditions across difficult terrain and they work on most branch lines in the central, eastern, northern and north-eastern parts of the country.

=== Zambia ===
Between October 1978 and May 1993, Zambia Railways (ZR) hired locomotives to solve its chronic shortages in motive power, mainly from South Africa but at times also from Zaire, Zimbabwe, the TAZARA Railway and even the Zambian Copper Mines. In Zambia, the South African locomotives were mainly used on goods trains between Livingstone and Kitwe, sometimes in tandem with a ZR locomotive and occasionally also on passenger trains.

The first period of hire lasted from October 1978 until about April 1981. Locomotives were selected from a pool of engines in the Classes 33-400, 35-000 and 35-200 which were allocated by the Railways for hire to Zambia. The South African fleet in Zambia was never constant, since locomotives were continually exchanged when they became due back in South Africa for their three-monthly services.

In November 1979, six Class 35-200 locomotives were on hire, but they are believed to have left Zambia in early 1980. A full list of the locomotives which were used in Zambia is not available, but no. 35-246 is known to have been used there during this period.

=== CamRail and Sudan Railways ===
Nine Class 35-200 locomotives were leased to CamRail, a company which had a twenty-year concession to operate the Cameroon National Railway. These units were regauged to 1,000 mm (3 ft 3 3/8 in) metre gauge. Six of these later went on a second lease until June 2007 to Sudan Railways, where they were numbered in the range from 3601 to 3606.

=== FCA and FSA, Brazil ===
Fifteen Class 35-200 locomotives went to Ferrovia Centro Atlântico (FCA) and Ferrovia Sul Atlântico (FSA) in Brazil, where they were also regauged to run on metre gauge. Both these railroads are now part of América Latina Logística (ALL), which operates in Brazil and Argentina.

Ten of these units went to FCA at Divinipolis in Brazil. While they were initially part of Spoornet Traction’s leasing scheme, they were later renumbered onto the FCA roster in the range from 8200 to 8209. The other five locomotives went to FSA at Curitiba in Brazil. Also initially part of Spoornet Traction’s leasing scheme, they were later renumbered onto the FSA roster in the range from 8210 to 8214.

== Works numbers ==
The Class 35-200 builders, works numbers, lease details and renumberings are listed in the table.

Class 35-200, GM-EMD type GT18MC
| Loco no. | Builder | Works no. | 1st lease | 2nd lease | New no. |
|---|---|---|---|---|---|
| 35-201 | GM-EMD | 712981 | | | |
| 35-202 | GM-EMD | 712982 | | | |
| 35-203 | GM-EMD | 712983 | | | |
| 35-204 | GM-EMD | 712984 | | | |
| 35-205 | GM-EMD | 712985 | | | |
| 35-206 | GM-EMD | 712986 | | | |
| 35-207 | GM-EMD | 712987 | | | |
| 35-208 | GM-EMD | 712988 | | | |
| 35-209 | GM-EMD | 712989 | | | |
| 35-210 | GM-EMD | 712990 | | | |
| 35-211 | GM-EMD | 712991 | | | |
| 35-212 | GM-EMD | 712992 | | | |
| 35-213 | GM-EMD | 712993 | | | |
| 35-214 | GM-EMD | 712994 | | | |
| 35-215 | GM-EMD | 712995 | | | |
| 35-216 | GM-EMD | 712996 | | | |
| 35-217 | GM-EMD | 712997 | | | |
| 35-218 | GM-EMD | 712998 | | | |
| 35-219 | GM-EMD | 712999 | | | |
| 35-220 | GM-EMD | 713000 | | | |
| 35-221 | GM-EMD | 713001 | | | |
| 35-222 | GM-EMD | 713002 | | | |
| 35-223 | GM-EMD | 713003 | | | |
| 35-224 | GM-EMD | 713004 | Camrail | Sudan | 3601 |
| 35-225 | GM-EMD | 713005 | Camrail | Sudan | 3602 |
| 35-226 | GMSA | 100-1 | Camrail | | |
| 35-227 | GMSA | 100-2 | Camrail | Sudan | 3603 |
| 35-228 | GMSA | 100-3 | Camrail | | |
| 35-229 | GMSA | 100-4 | Camrail | Sudan | 3604 |
| 35-230 | GMSA | 100-5 | | | |
| 35-231 | GMSA | 100-6 | | | |
| 35-232 | GMSA | 100-7 | | | |
| 35-233 | GMSA | 100-8 | FCA | | 8202 |
| 35-234 | GMSA | 100-9 | | | |
| 35-235 | GMSA | 100-10 | FCA | | 8203 |
| 35-236 | GMSA | 100-11 | | | |
| 35-237 | GMSA | 100-12 | | | |
| 35-238 | GMSA | 100-13 | | | |
| 35-239 | GMSA | 100-14 | | | |
| 35-240 | GMSA | 100-15 | | | |
| 35-241 | GMSA | 100-16 | | | |
| 35-242 | GMSA | 100-17 | | | |
| 35-243 | GMSA | 100-18 | Camrail | Sudan | 3605 |
| AECI 2 | GMSA | 100-19 | | | |
| 35-244 | GMSA | 107-01 | Camrail | Sudan | 3606 |
| 35-245 | GMSA | 100-20 | Camrail | | |
| 35-246 | GMSA | 100-21 | Zambia | | |
| 35-247 | GMSA | 100-22 | | | |
| 35-248 | GMSA | 100-23 | | | |
| 35-249 | GMSA | 100-24 | | | |
| 35-250 | GMSA | 100-25 | | | |
| 35-251 | GMSA | 100-26 | | | |
| 35-252 | GMSA | 100-27 | | | |
| 35-253 | GMSA | 100-28 | | | |
| 35-254 | GMSA | 100-29 | | | |
| 35-255 | GMSA | 100-30 | FSA | | 8210 |
| 35-256 | GMSA | 100-31 | | | |
| 35-257 | GMSA | 100-32 | | | |
| 35-258 | GMSA | 100-33 | | | |
| 35-259 | GMSA | 100-34 | | | |
| 35-260 | GMSA | 100-35 | | | |
| 35-261 | GMSA | 100-36 | | | |
| 35-262 | GMSA | 100-37 | | | |
| 35-263 | GMSA | 100-38 | | | |
| 35-264 | GMSA | 100-39 | | | |
| 35-265 | GMSA | 100-40 | | | |
| 35-266 | GMSA | 100-41 | | | |
| 35-267 | GMSA | 100-42 | | | |
| 35-268 | GMSA | 100-43 | | | |
| 35-269 | GMSA | 100-44 | | | |
| 35-270 | GMSA | 100-45 | | | |
| 35-271 | GMSA | 100-46 | | | |
| 35-272 | GMSA | 100-47 | | | |
| 35-273 | GMSA | 100-48 | | | |
| 35-274 | GMSA | 100-49 | | | |
| 35-275 | GMSA | 100-50 | | | |
| 35-276 | GMSA | 100-51 | | | |
| 35-277 | GMSA | 100-52 | | | |
| 35-278 | GMSA | 100-53 | | | |
| 35-279 | GMSA | 100-54 | | | |
| 35-280 | GMSA | 100-55 | | | |
| 35-281 | GMSA | 100-56 | | | |
| 35-282 | GMSA | 100-57 | | | |
| 35-283 | GMSA | 100-58 | | | |
| 35-284 | GMSA | 100-59 | | | |
| 35-285 | GMSA | 100-60 | | | |
| 35-286 | GMSA | 100-61 | | | |
| 35-287 | GMSA | 100-62 | | | |
| 35-288 | GMSA | 100-63 | | | |
| 35-289 | GMSA | 100-64 | | | |
| 35-290 | GMSA | 100-65 | | | |
| 35-291 | GMSA | 100-66 | | | |
| 35-292 | GMSA | 100-67 | | | |
| 35-293 | GMSA | 100-68 | | | |
| 35-294 | GMSA | 100-69 | | | |
| 35-295 | GMSA | 100-70 | | | |
| 35-296 | GMSA | 100-71 | | | |
| 35-297 | GMSA | 100-72 | | | |
| 35-298 | GMSA | 100-73 | | | |
| 35-299 | GMSA | 100-74 | | | |
| 35-300 | GMSA | 100-75 | | | |
| 35-301 | GMSA | 102-1 | | | |
| 35-302 | GMSA | 102-2 | | | |
| 35-303 | GMSA | 102-3 | | | |
| 35-304 | GMSA | 102-4 | | | |
| 35-305 | GMSA | 102-5 | FSA | | 8211 |
| 35-306 | GMSA | 102-6 | FCA | | 8200 |
| 35-307 | GMSA | 102-7 | FCA | | 8201 |
| 35-308 | GMSA | 102-8 | FCA | | 8204 |
| 35-309 | GMSA | 102-9 | | | |
| 35-310 | GMSA | 102-10 | | | |
| 35-311 | GMSA | 102-11 | | | |
| 35-312 | GMSA | 102-12 | FSA | | 8212 |
| 35-313 | GMSA | 102-13 | FCA | | 8205 |
| 35-314 | GMSA | 102-14 | FCA | | 8206 |
| 35-315 | GMSA | 102-15 | FCA | | 8207 |
| 35-316 | GMSA | 102-16 | | | |
| 35-317 | GMSA | 102-17 | | | |
| 35-318 | GMSA | 102-18 | | | |
| 35-319 | GMSA | 102-19 | | | |
| 35-320 | GMSA | 102-20 | FCA | | 8208 |
| 35-321 | GMSA | 102-21 | | | |
| 35-322 | GMSA | 102-22 | | | |
| 35-323 | GMSA | 102-23 | | | |
| 35-324 | GMSA | 102-24 | FSA | | 8213 |
| 35-325 | GMSA | 102-25 | | | |
| 35-326 | GMSA | 102-26 | | | |
| 35-327 | GMSA | 102-27 | | | |
| 35-328 | GMSA | 102-28 | | | |
| 35-329 | GMSA | 102-29 | | | |
| 35-330 | GMSA | 102-30 | | | |
| 35-331 | GMSA | 102-31 | | | |
| 35-332 | GMSA | 102-32 | | | |
| 35-333 | GMSA | 102-33 | FSA | | 8214 |
| 35-334 | GMSA | 102-34 | | | |
| 35-335 | GMSA | 102-35 | | | |
| 35-336 | GMSA | 102-36 | | | |
| 35-337 | GMSA | 102-37 | | | |
| 35-338 | GMSA | 102-38 | | | |
| 35-339 | GMSA | 102-39 | | | |
| 35-340 | GMSA | 102-40 | | | |
| 35-341 | GMSA | 102-41 | | | |
| 35-342 | GMSA | 102-42 | FCA | | 8209 |
| 35-343 | GMSA | 102-43 | | | |
| 35-344 | GMSA | 102-44 | | | |
| 35-345 | GMSA | 102-45 | | | |
| 35-346 | GMSA | 102-46 | | | |
| 35-347 | GMSA | 102-47 | | | |
| 35-348 | GMSA | 102-48 | | | |
| 35-349 | GMSA | 102-49 | | | |
| 35-350 | GMSA | 102-50 | | | |

== Liveries ==
The Class 35-200 were all delivered in the SAR Gulf Red livery with signal red buffer beams, yellow side stripes on the long hood sides and a yellow V on each end. In the 1990s many of the Class 35-200 units began to be repainted in the Spoornet orange livery with a yellow and blue chevron pattern on the buffer beams. Several later received the Spoornet maroon livery. In the late 1990s many were repainted in the Spoornet blue livery with outline numbers on the long hood sides. After 2008 in the Transnet Freight Rail (TFR) and Passenger Rail Agency of South Africa (PRASA) era, many were repainted in the TFR red, green and yellow livery and at least two were repainted in the PRASA purple Shosholoza Meyl livery.

== Illustration ==
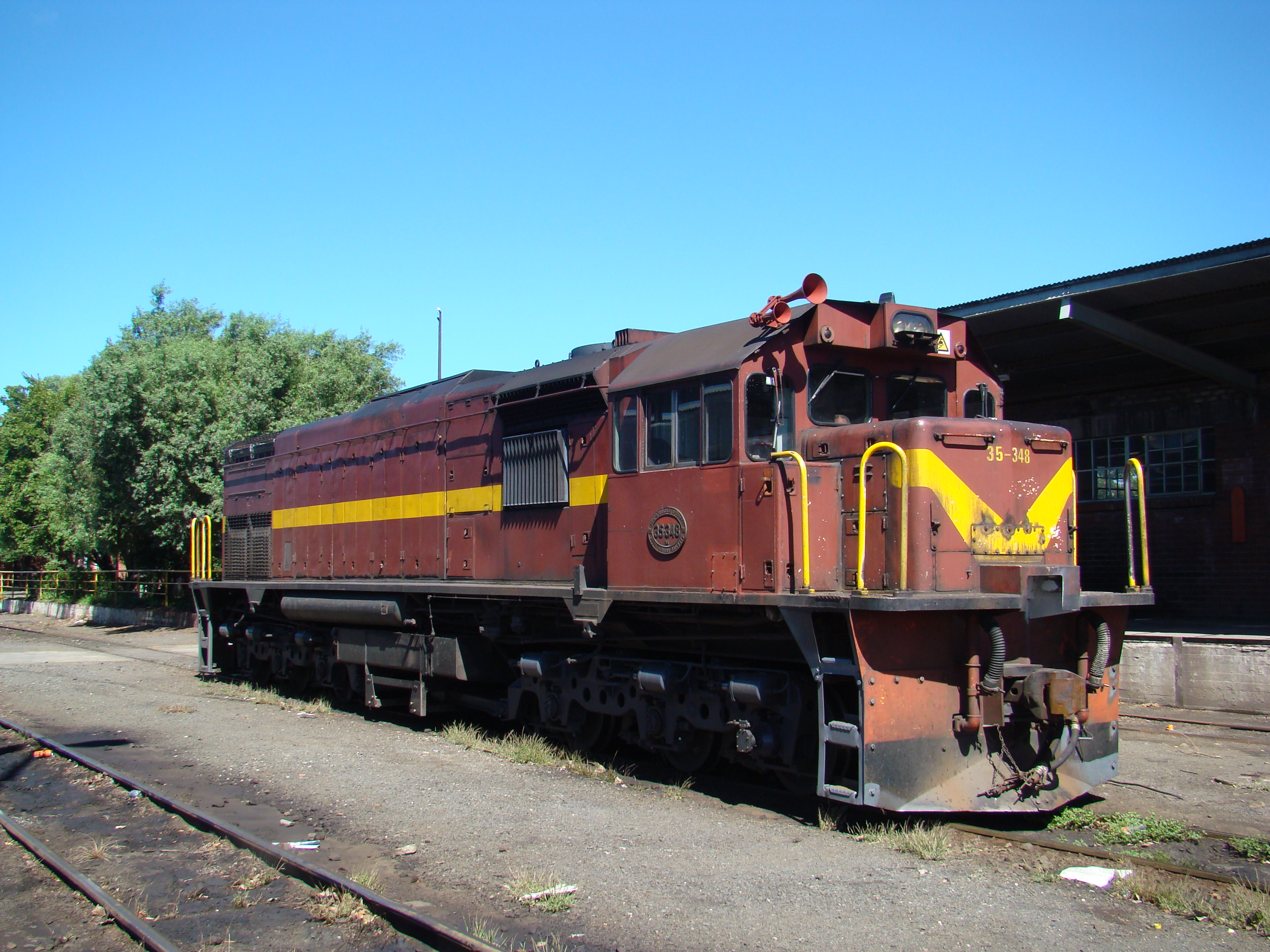
No. 35-348 in SAR Gulf Red and whiskers livery, Beaconsfield, 27 January 2010

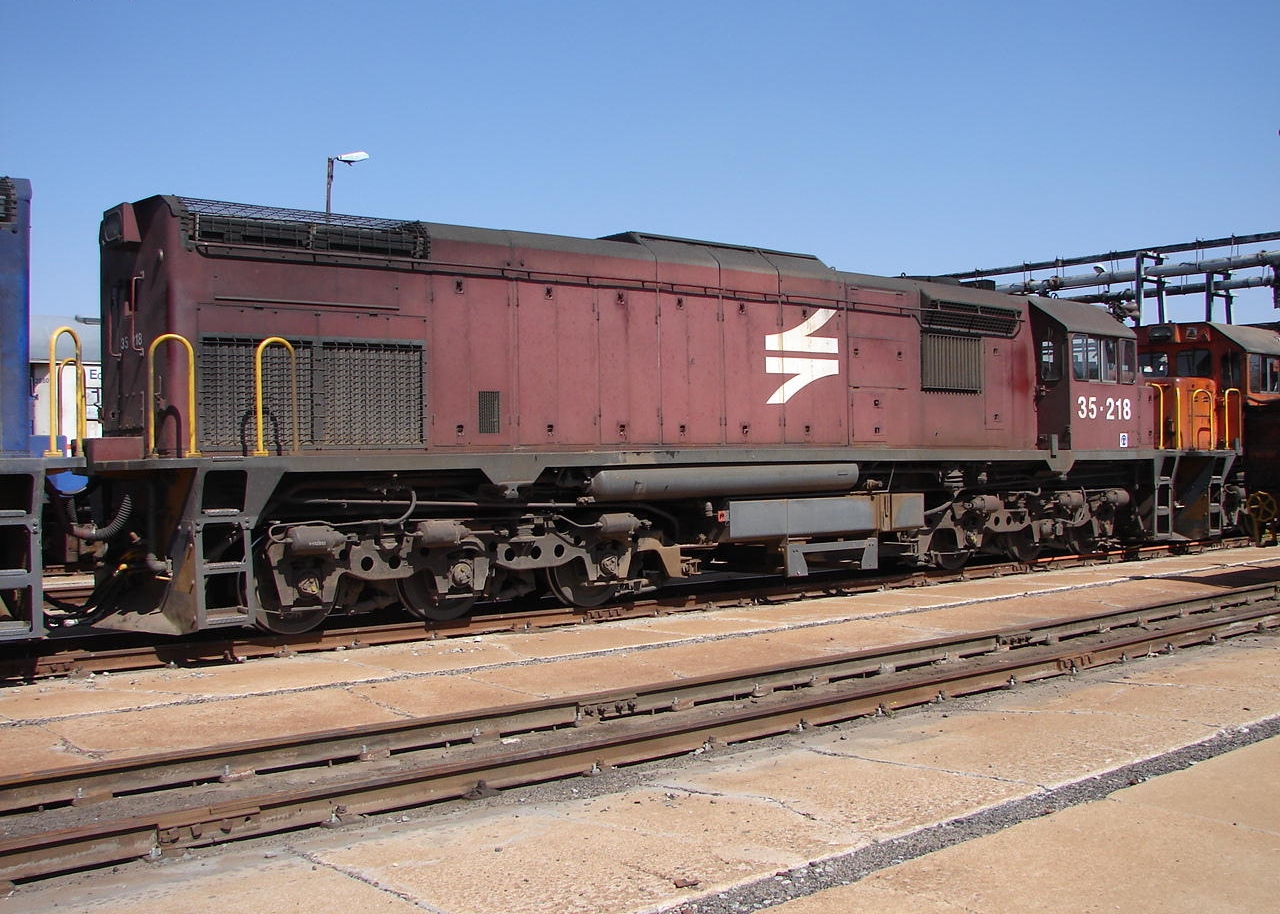
No. 35-218 in Spoornet maroon livery, Beaconsfield, Kimberley, 25 August 2007

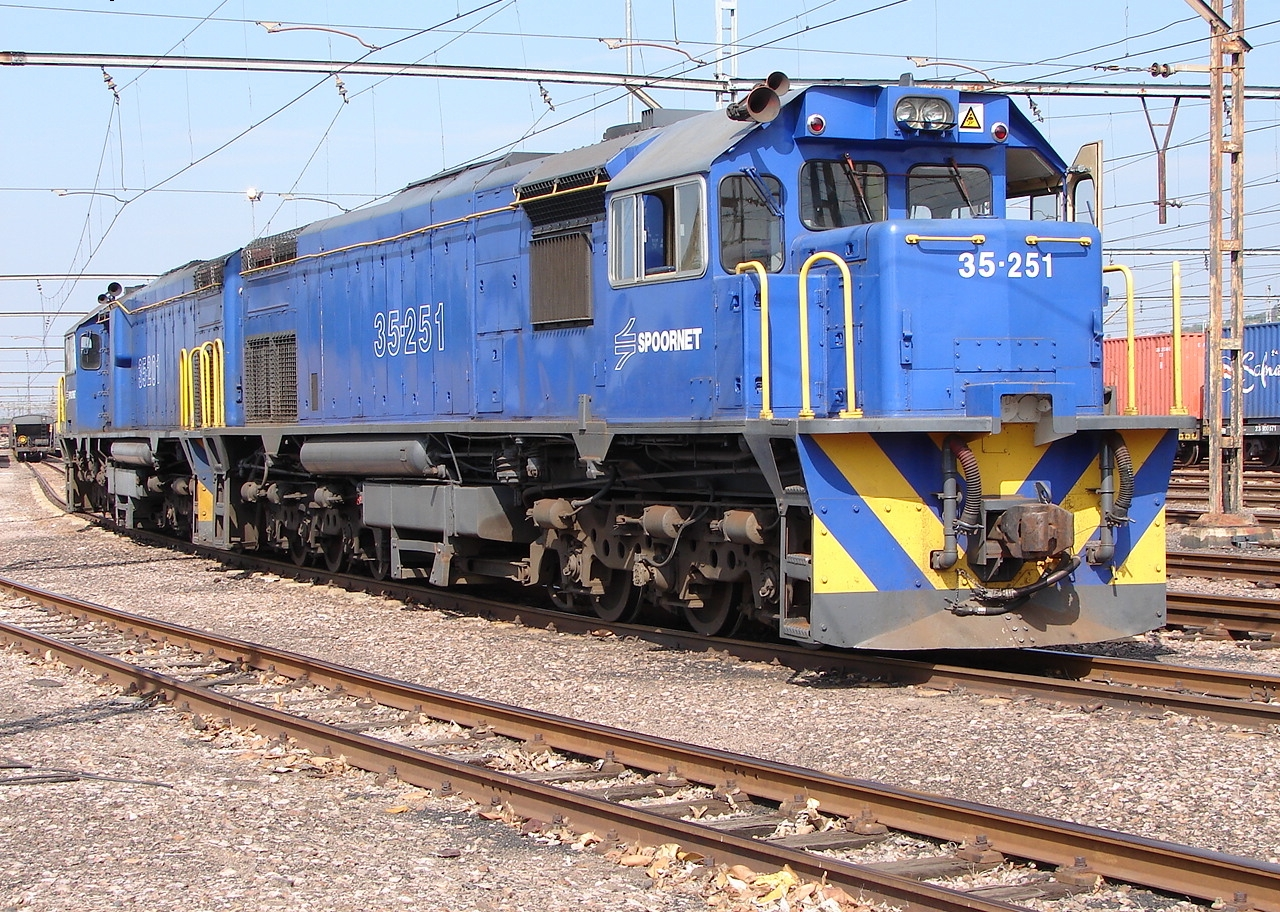
No. 35-251 in Spoornet blue with outline numbers, Capital Park, 1 October 2009

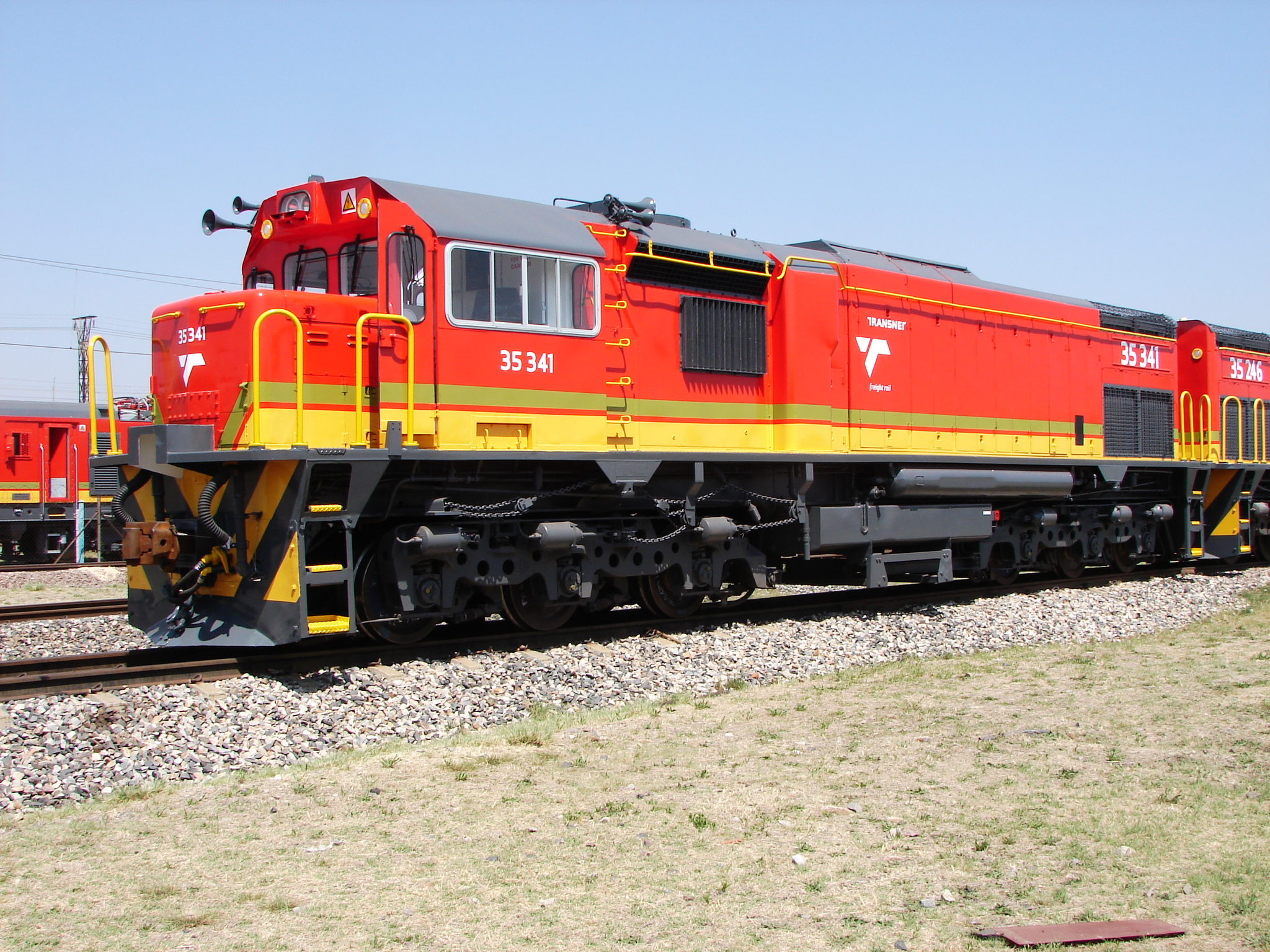
No. 35-341 in Transnet Freight Rail livery, Koedoespoort, 29 September 2015

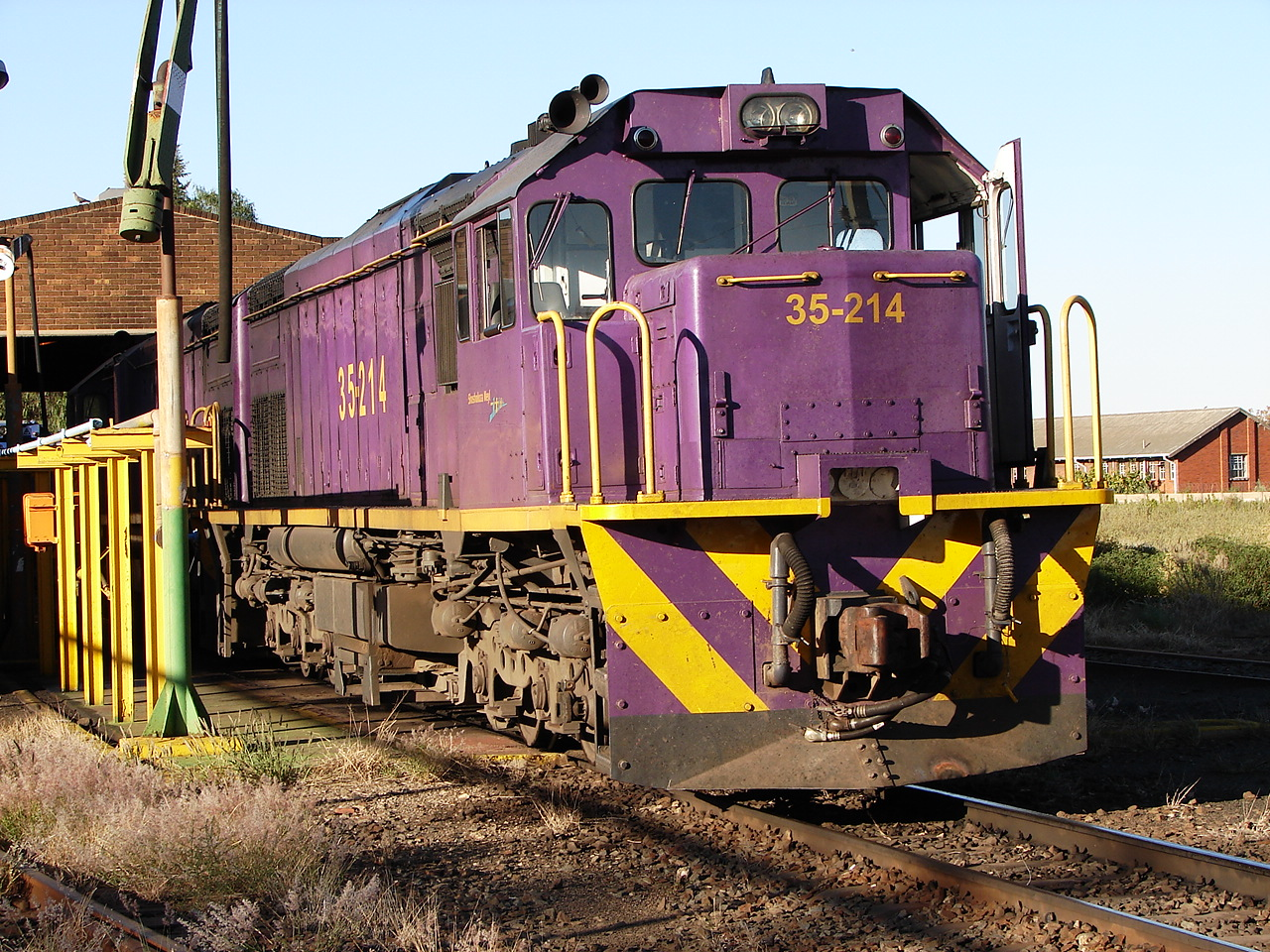
No. 35-214 in PRASA's Shosholoza Meyl livery, Bloemfontein, 29 April 2013
