= South African Class 35-000 =

Diesel-electric locomotive type

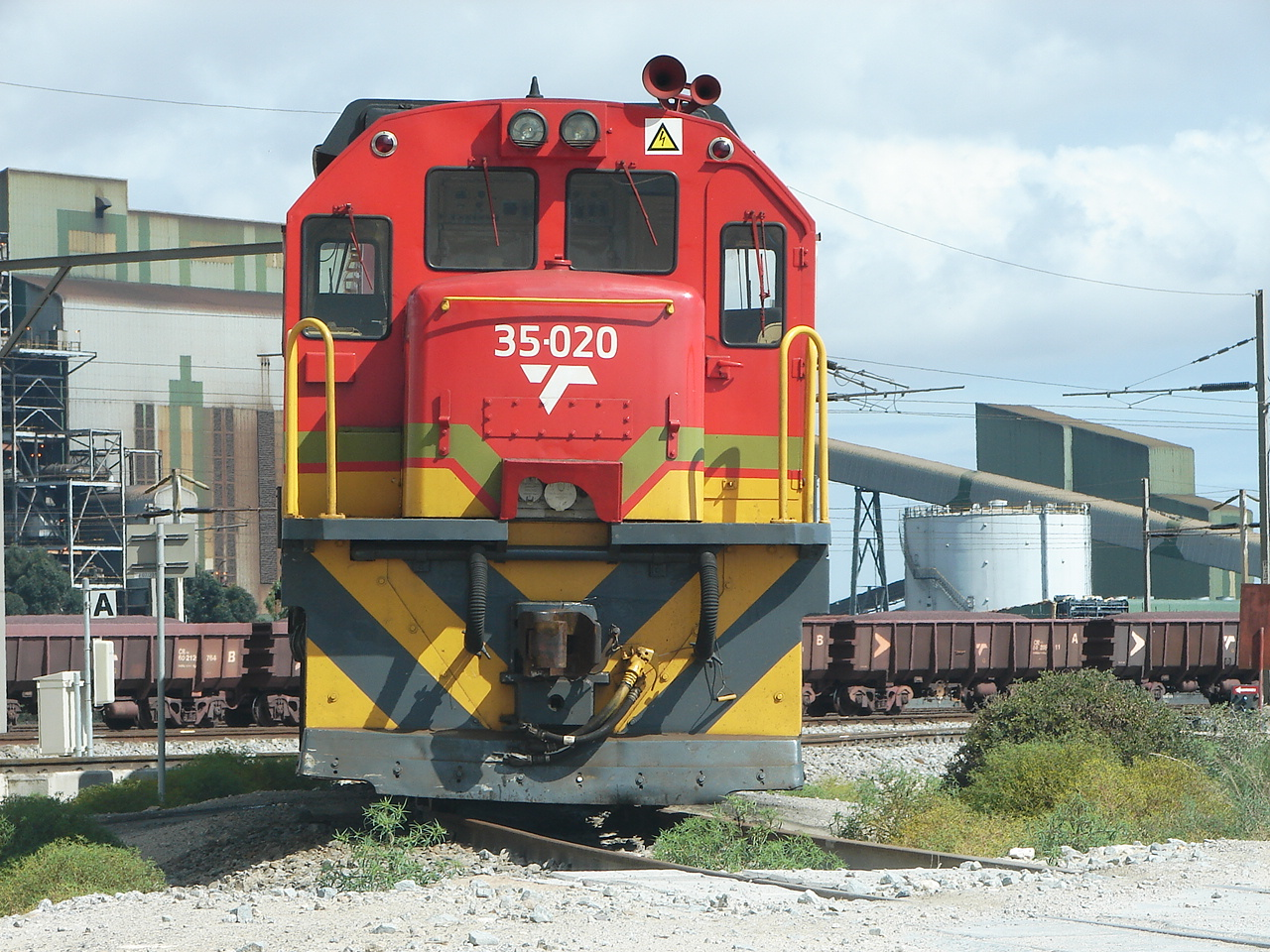
- No. 35-020 in Transnet Freight Rail livery, Saldanha, Western Cape, 10 February 2013
Type and origin
- Power type: Diesel-electric
- Designer: General Electric
- Builder: General Electric
- Serial number: 38161-38210, 38724-38743
- Model: GE U15C
- Build date: 1972-1973
- Total produced: 70
Specifications
- Configuration
  - AAR: C-C
  - UIC: Co'Co'
  - Commonwealth: Co+Co
- Gauge: 3 ft 6 in (1,067 mm) Cape gauge
- Wheel diameter: 915 mm (36.0 in)
- Wheelbase: 10,782 mm (35 ft 4.5 in)
  - Bogie: 3,188 mm (10 ft 5.5 in)
- Pivot centres: 7,860 mm (25 ft 9.4 in)
- Length
  - Over couplers: 15,152 mm (49 ft 8.5 in)
- Width: 2,753 mm (9 ft 0.4 in)
- Height: 3,874 mm (12 ft 8.5 in)
- Axle load: 13,720 kg (30,250 lb)
- Adhesive weight: 82,320 kg (181,480 lb)
- Loco weight: 82,320 kg (181,480 lb)
- Fuel type: Diesel
- Fuel capacity: 2,700 litres (590 imp gal)
- Prime mover: GE 7FDL-8
- RPM range: 385-1,050
  - RPM low idle: 385
  - RPM idle: 450
  - Maximum RPM: 1,050
- Engine type: 4-stroke diesel
- Aspiration: Elliott H-584 turbocharger
- Generator: 10 pole GE 5GT-581C15
- Traction motors: Six GE 5GE-764-C1 DC 4 pole
  - Rating 1 hour: 655A
  - Continuous: 645A @ 17 km/h (11 mph)
- Cylinders: V8
- Gear ratio: 90:17
- MU working: 4 maximum
- Loco brake: 28-LAV-1 with vigilance control
- Train brakes: Westinghouse 6CDX4UC compressor/exhauster
- Air tank cap.: 740 litres (160 imp gal)
- Compressor: 0.033 m^{3}/s (1.2 cu ft/s)
- Exhauster: 0.130 m^{3}/s (4.6 cu ft/s)
- Couplers: AAR knuckle (SASKOP DS)
Performance figures
- Maximum speed: 100 km/h (62 mph)
- Power output
  - Starting: 1,230 kW (1,650 hp)
  - Continuous: 1,160 kW (1,560 hp)
- Tractive effort
  - Starting: 201 kN (45,000 lbf) @ 25% adh.
  - Continuous: 161 kN (36,000 lbf) @ 21 km/h (13 mph)
- Factor of adh.
  - Starting: 25%
  - Continuous: 20%
- Brakeforce: 60% ratio @ 345 kPa (50.0 psi)
- Dynamic brake peak effort: 138 kN (31,000 lbf) @ 28 km/h (17 mph)
Career
- Operators: South African Railways; Spoornet; Transnet Freight Rail; Zambia Railways; NLPI
- Class: Class 35-000
- Number in class: 70
- Numbers: 35-001 to 35-070
- Delivered: 1972-1973
- First run: 1972

The South African Railways Class 35-000 of 1972 is a diesel-electric locomotive.

Between March 1972 and May 1973, the South African Railways placed seventy Class 35-000 General Electric type U15C diesel-electric locomotives in branch line service.

== Manufacturer ==
The South African Class 35-000 type GE U15C diesel-electric locomotive was designed and built for the South African Railways (SAR) by General Electric (GE) and imported. The first batch of fifty locomotives was delivered in 1972, numbered in the range from 35-001 to 35-050, with the first locomotives arriving in March. These were followed by a second batch of twenty in 1973, numbered in the range from 35-051 to 35-070. The last locomotives arrived in May 1973.

== Class 35 series ==
=== GE and GM-EMD designs ===
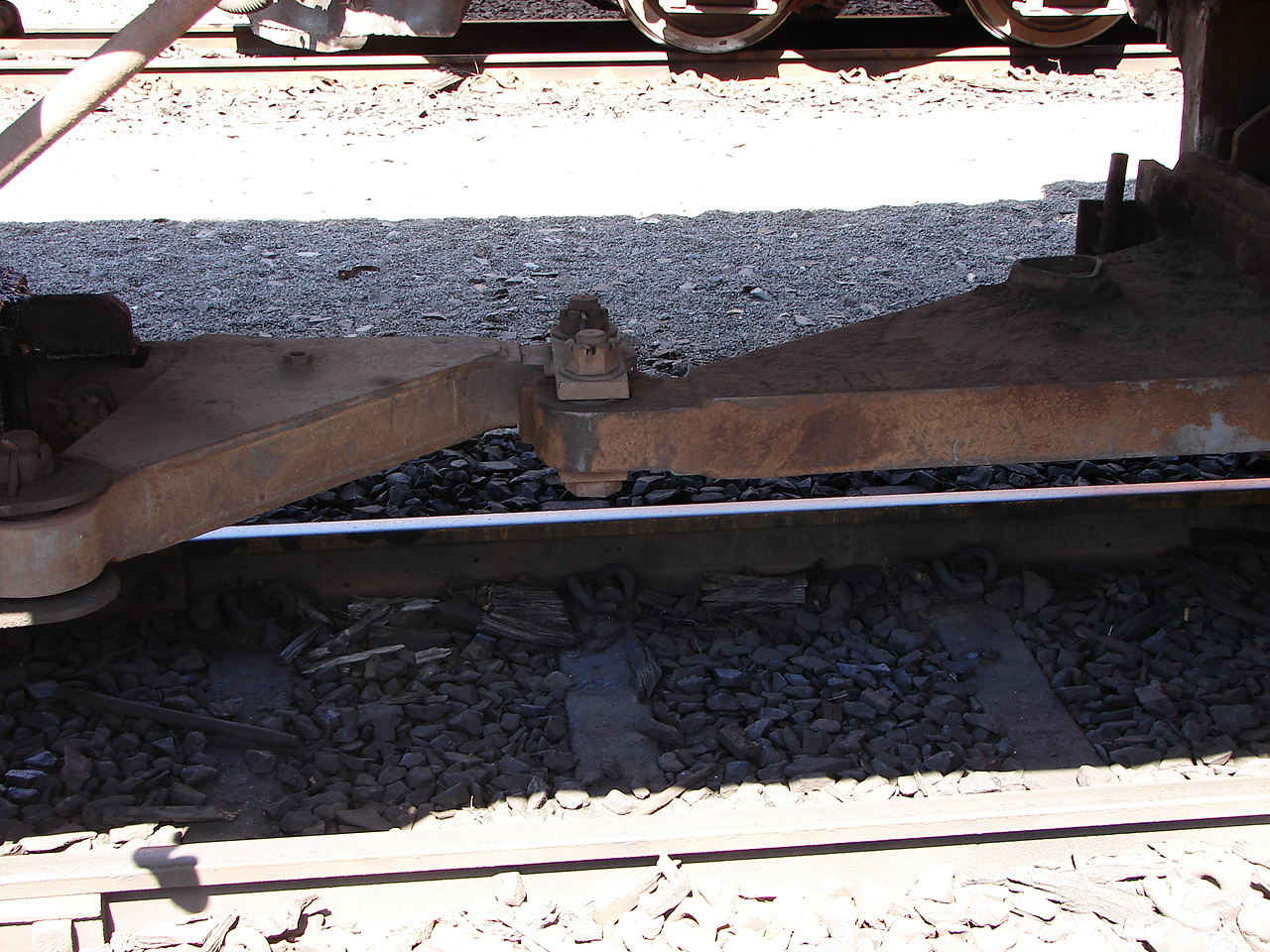
Inter-bogie linkage

The Class 35 locomotive family consists of five sub-classes, the GE Classes 35-000 and 35-400 and the General Motors Electro-Motive Division (GM-EMD) Classes 35-200, 35-600 and 35-800. Both manufacturers also produced locomotives for the South African Classes 33, 34 and 36.

The locomotive has interlinked bogies, hence the Co+Co wheel arrangement classification. The linkage is usually hidden from view by the saddle-shaped fuel tank.

=== Distinguishing Features ===
With the two GE U15C Class 35 models, the Class 35-000 can be distinguished from the Class 35-400 by the length of the humps on their long hoods, the Class 35-000 having a hump that is more than twice as long as that of the Class 35-400. An externally visible modification which was done during major overhauls is the addition of a saddle hood astride the long hump of the Class 35-000. By 2013 this modification had been done on a large number of Class 35-000 units, but no similar modification was done on any Class 35-400.

== Service ==
=== South African Railways ===
The Class 35 is South Africa's standard branch line diesel-electric locomotive. The GE Class 35-000 was designed to operate on light rail and they work on most branch lines in the central, western, southern and southeastern parts of the country.

In the Western Cape, they work out of Cape Town on the branch lines to Bitterfontein, Saldanha and Caledon, and out of Worcester to George. A threesome is allocated to the Swartkops depot in Port Elizabeth from where they work the Passenger Rail Agency of South Africa (PRASA) MetroRail commuter trains to Uitenhage.

=== Zambia ===
Between October 1978 and May 1993, Zambia Railways (ZR) hired locomotives to solve its chronic shortages in motive power, mainly from South Africa but at times also from Zaire, Zimbabwe, the TAZARA Railway and even the Zambian Copper Mines. In Zambia, the South African locomotives were mainly used on goods trains between Livingstone and Kitwe, sometimes in tandem with a ZR locomotive and occasionally also on passenger trains.

The first period of hire lasted from October 1978 until about April 1981. Locomotives were selected from a pool of units in the Classes 33-400, 35-000 and 35-200 which were allocated by the Railways for hire to Zambia. The South African fleet in Zambia was never constant, since locomotives were continually exchanged as they became due back in South Africa for their three-monthly services.

The pool of Class 35-000 locomotives allocated by the Railways for hire to ZR included the locomotives annotated "Zambia" in the "allocation" column in the table. The first Class 35-000 units to serve in Zambia were on hire by May 1980. They served there for less than a year, being employed on road work as well as shunting. By the end of March 1981 the last Class 35-000 unit to remain there was no. 35-064 which was due to return to South Africa as soon as the last of ZR's new Krupp-built diesel locomotives, no. 0-210, was delivered.

=== NLPI Ltd. ===
NLPI Limited, abbreviated from New Limpopo Projects Investments, is a Mauritius-registered company which specialises in private sector investments using the build-operate-transfer (BOT) concept. It had three connected railway operations in Zimbabwe and Zambia that formed a rail link between South Africa and the Democratic Republic of Congo.

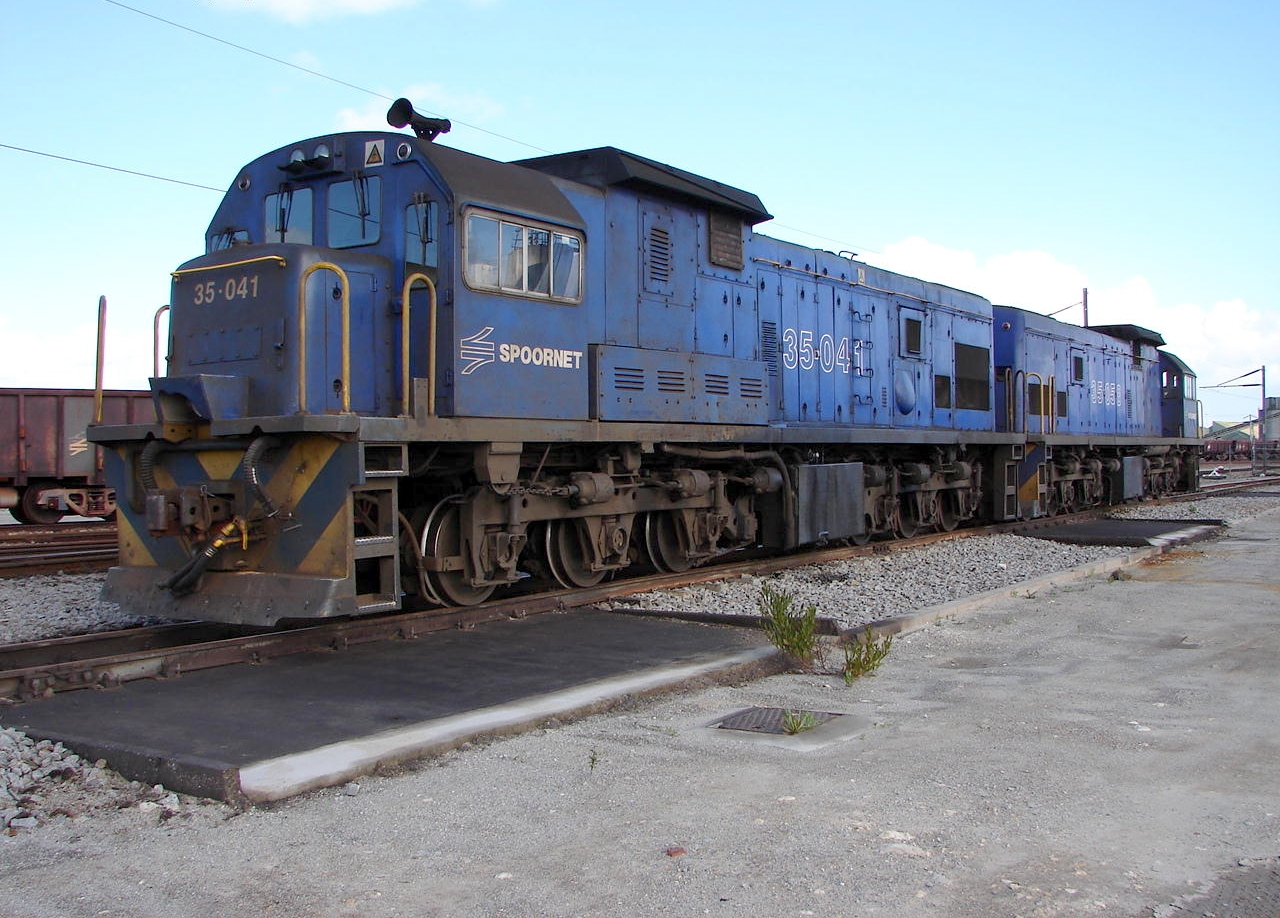
No. 35-041 in Spoornet livery in the OREX yard, Saldanha, Western Cape, 12 September 2007

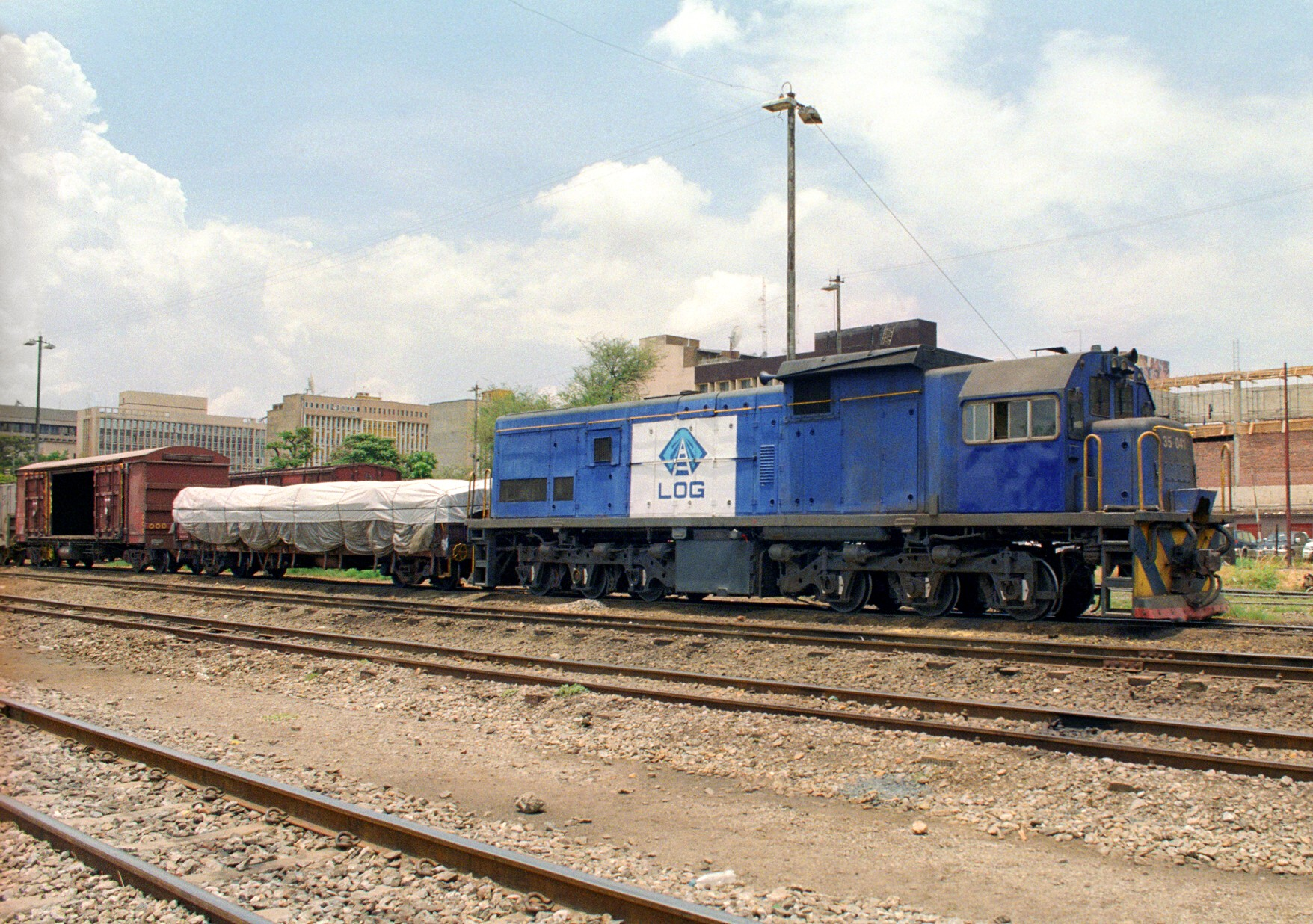
No. 35-041 in NLPI Logistics livery with the cabside's "Spoornet" painted over, Lusaka, Zambia, 12 November 2008

- The Beitbridge Bulawayo Railway (BBR) was commissioned on 1 September 1999 and operates between Beit Bridge and Bulawayo in Zimbabwe.
- Since February 2004 NLPI Logistics (NLL or LOG) has been operating between Bulawayo and Victoria Falls on the Zimbabwe-Zambia border.
- Since February 2003 the Railway Systems of Zambia (RSZ) operated on the former Zambian Railways (ZR) line from Victoria Falls to Sakania in the Congo.

In Zambia, the RSZ locomotive fleet included former ZR locomotives, but the rest of the locomotive fleet of all three operations consisted of South African GM-EMD Classes 34-200, 34-600 and 34-800 and GE Classes 35-000 and 35-400 locomotives. These units were sometimes marked or branded as either BBR or LOG or both but their status, whether leased or loaned, was unclear since they were still on the TFR roster and still often worked in South Africa as well. The units did not appear to be restricted to working in any one of the three operations sections and have been observed being transferred between Zimbabwe and Zambia across the bridge at Victoria Falls as required. Class 35-000 locomotives which serve with NLPI include the locomotives annotated "NLPI" in the "allocation" column in the table.

Zambia Railways, the state-owned holding company, resumed control of the Zambian national rail network on 11 September 2012. This followed the Zambian government's decision to revoke the operating concession which had been awarded to RSZ after Finance Minister Alexander Chikwanda claimed that RSZ had "blatantly disregarded the provisions of the agreement" and had been "acting in a manner prejudicial to the interests of Zambians".

== Works numbers ==
The Class 35-000 builder's works numbers and where applicable, leased service in Zambia or more recently with NLPI are listed in the table.

Class 35-000, GE type U15C
| Image | Loco no. | Works no. | Allocation |
|---|---|---|---|
| | 35-001 | 38161 | |
| | 35-002 | 38162 | |
| | 35-003 | 38163 | |
| | 35-004 | 38164 | |
| | 35-005 | 38165 | NLPI |
| | 35-006 | 38166 | |
| | 35-007 | 38167 | |
| | 35-008 | 38168 | |
| | 35-009 | 38169 | |
| | 35-010 | 38170 | |
| | 35-011 | 38171 | |
| | 35-012 | 38172 | |
| | 35-013 | 38173 | |
| | 35-014 | 38174 | |
| | 35-015 | 38175 | NLPI |
| | 35-016 | 38176 | |
| | 35-017 | 38177 | |
| | 35-018 | 38178 | |
| | 35-019 | 38179 | |
| | 35-020 | 38180 | |
| | 35-021 | 38181 | |
| | 35-022 | 38182 | Zambia, NLPI |
| | 35-023 | 38183 | |
| | 35-024 | 38184 | |
| | 35-025 | 38185 | |
| | 35-026 | 38186 | |
| | 35-027 | 38187 | |
| | 35-028 | 38188 | |
| | 35-029 | 38189 | |
| | 35-030 | 38190 | |
| | 35-031 | 38191 | |
| | 35-032 | 38192 | Zambia |
| | 35-033 | 38193 | NLPI |
| | 35-034 | 38194 | |
| | 35-035 | 38195 | NLPI |
| | 35-036 | 38196 | |
| | 35-037 | 38197 | Zambia |
| | 35-038 | 38198 | Zambia |
| | 35-039 | 38199 | |
| | 35-040 | 38200 | NLPI |
| | 35-041 | 38201 | NLPI |
| | 35-042 | 38202 | Zambia |
| | 35-043 | 38203 | |
| | 35-044 | 38204 | Zambia, NLPI |
| | 35-045 | 38205 | |
| | 35-046 | 38206 | |
| | 35-047 | 38207 | NLPI |
| | 35-048 | 38208 | NLPI |
| | 35-049 | 38209 | Zambia |
| | 35-050 | 38210 | |
| | 35-051 | 38724 | Zambia |
| | 35-052 | 38725 | |
| | 35-053 | 38726 | |
| | 35-054 | 38727 | |
| | 35-055 | 38728 | |
| | 35-056 | 38729 | |
| | 35-057 | 38730 | |
| | 35-058 | 38731 | NLPI |
| | 35-059 | 38732 | |
| | 35-060 | 38733 | |
| | 35-061 | 38734 | |
| | 35-062 | 38735 | Zambia |
| | 35-063 | 38736 | |
| | 35-064 | 38737 | Zambia, PRASA |
| | 35-065 | 38738 | PRASA |
| | 35-066 | 38739 | Zambia |
| | 35-067 | 38740 | Zambia |
| | 35-068 | 38741 | |
| | 35-069 | 38742 | |
| | 35-070 | 38743 | PRASA |

== Liveries ==
The Class 35-000 were all delivered in the SAR Gulf Red livery with signal red buffer beams, yellow side stripes on the long hood sides and a yellow V on each end. In the 1990s many of the Class 35-000 units began to be repainted in the Spoornet orange livery with a yellow and blue chevron pattern on the buffer beams. In the late 1990s many were repainted once again, this time in the Spoornet blue livery with outline numbers on the long hood sides. After 2008 in the Transnet Freight Rail (TFR) era, many were repainted in the TFR red, green and yellow livery.

== Illustration ==
The main picture shows no. 35-020 in the Transnet Freight Rail livery and with a saddle hood in the Orex Yard at Saldanha. The other liveries that were applied to Class 35-000 and the saddle hood modification are illustrated below. The last picture shows the top of a locomotive with a saddle hood. It was involved in a major derailment near Moorreesburg when the track roadbed was washed away during heavy rain and flooding.

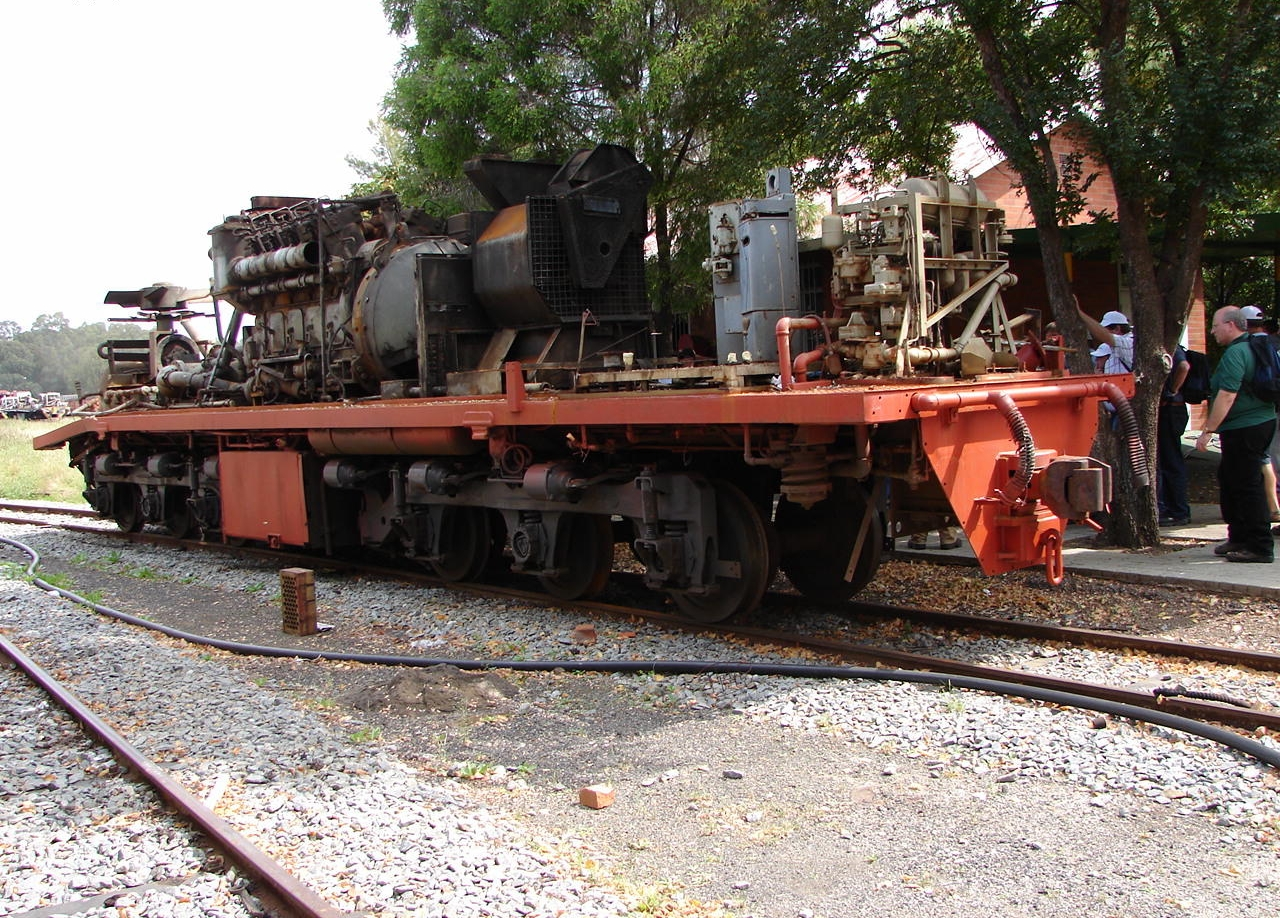
No. 35-031 awaiting repair after accident damage, at the Transwerk shops in Bloemfontein, 7 April 2006

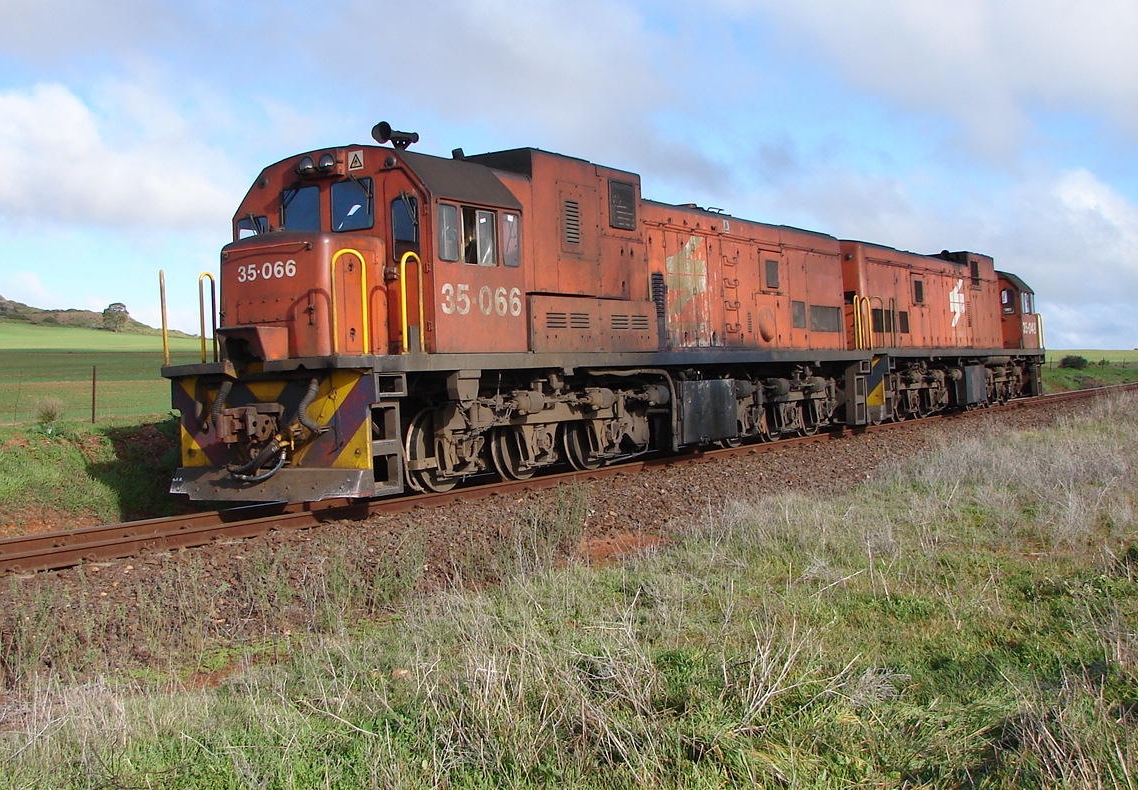
No. 35-066 in Spoornet orange livery and without a saddle hood, Biesiesfontein Farm near Moorreesburg, 9 June 2007

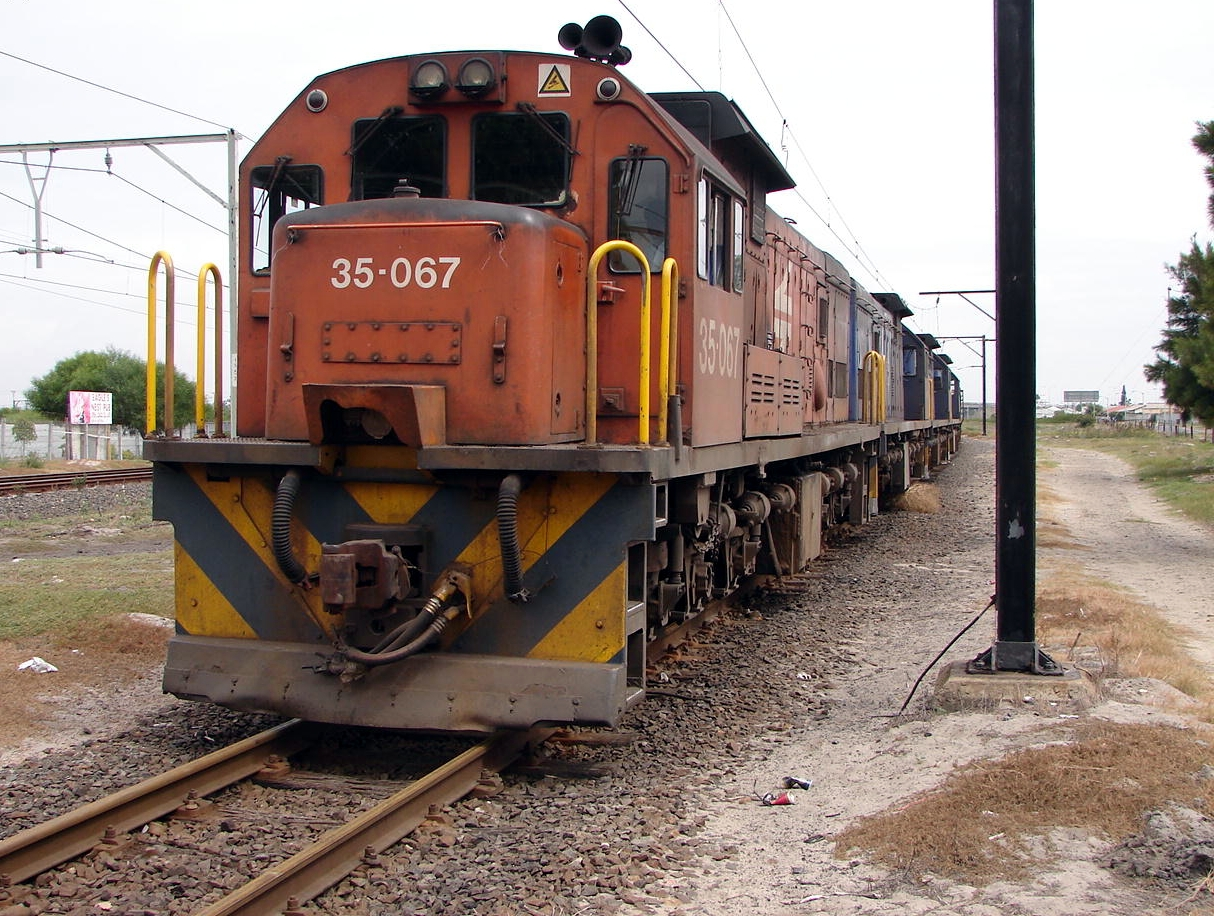
No. 35-067 in Spoornet orange livery and with a saddle hood, Stikland, Cape Town, 22 March 2007

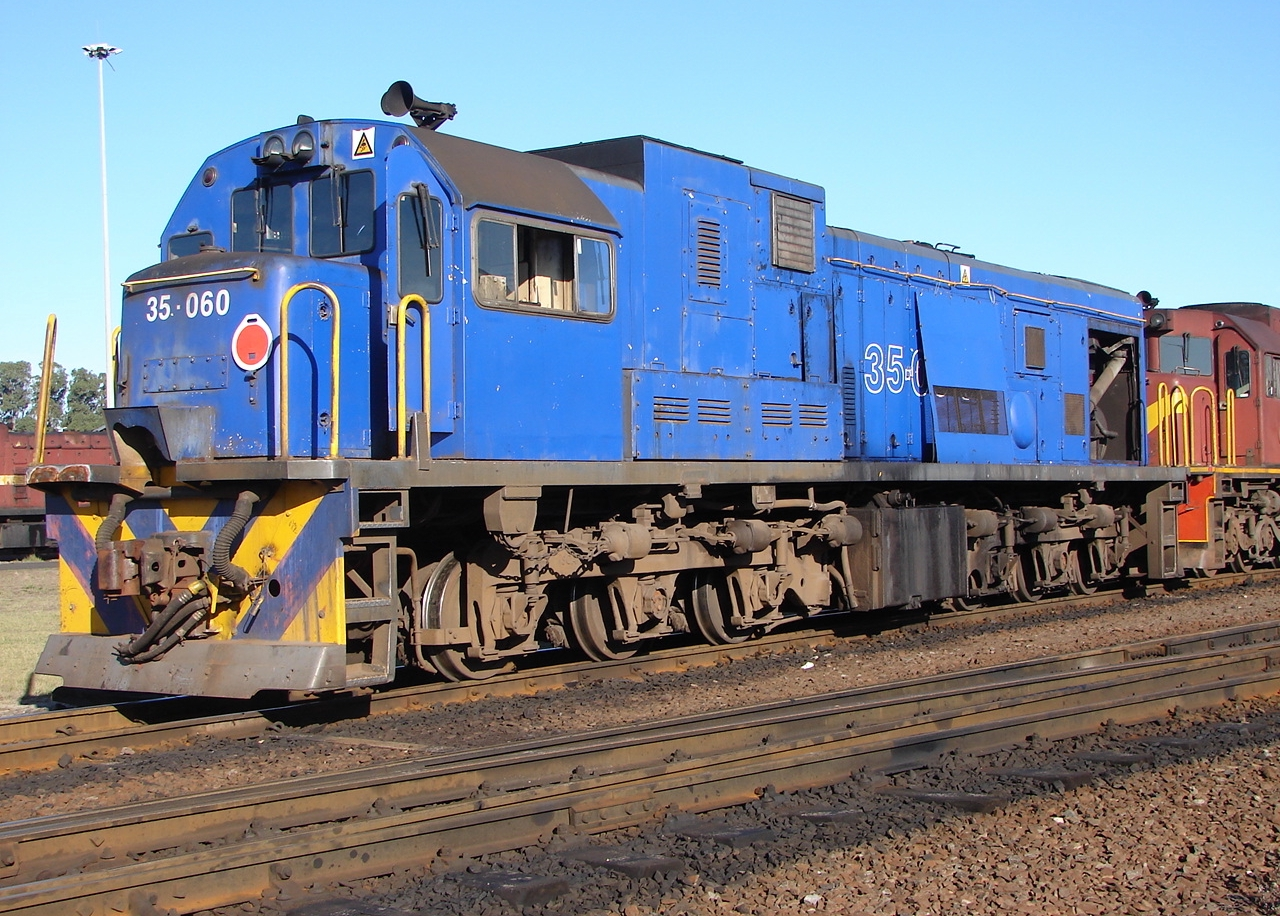
No. 35-060 in Spoornet blue livery and without a saddle hood, Bellville, Cape Town, 26 April 2009

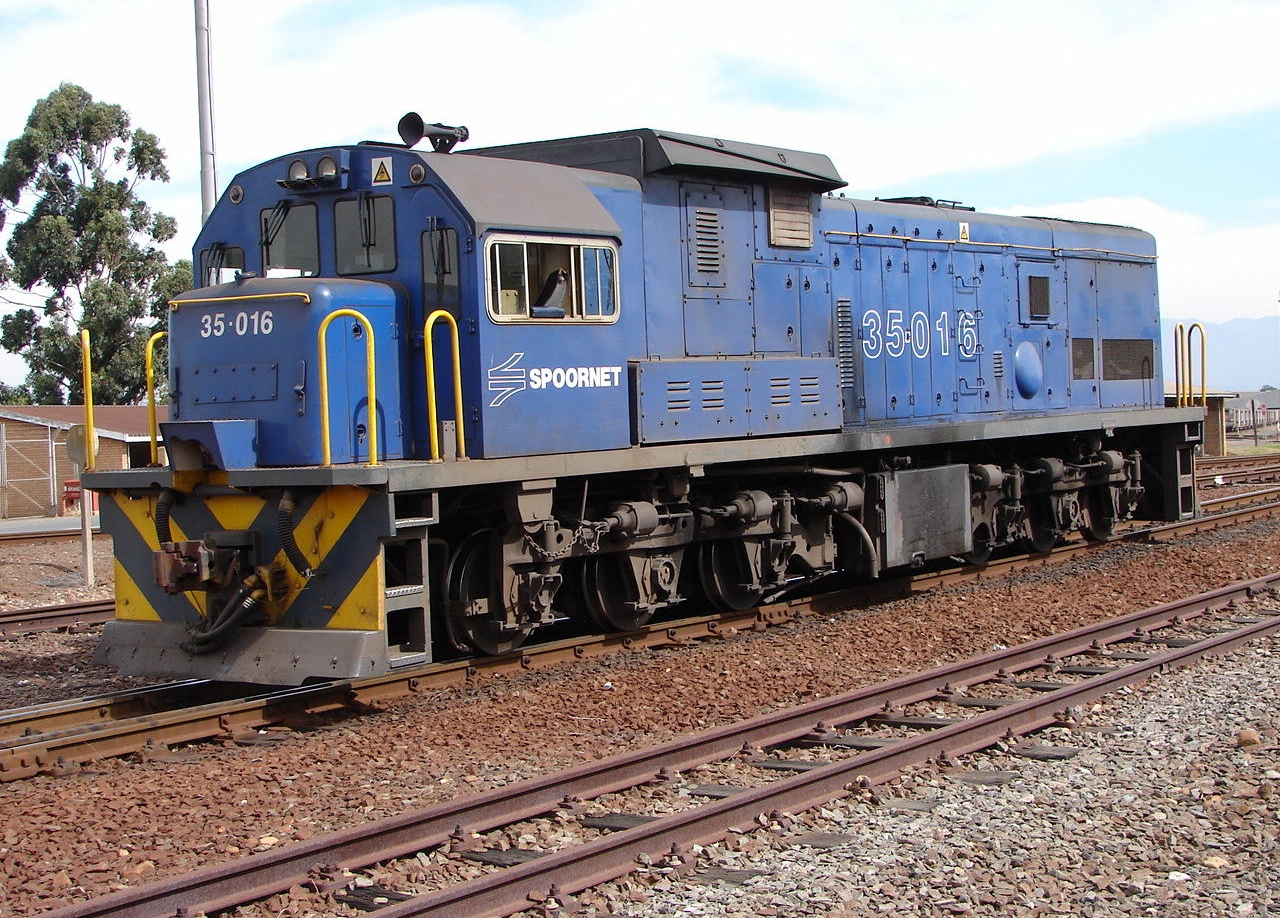
No. 35-016 in Spoornet blue livery and with a saddle hood, Worcester, Western Cape, 13 April 2006

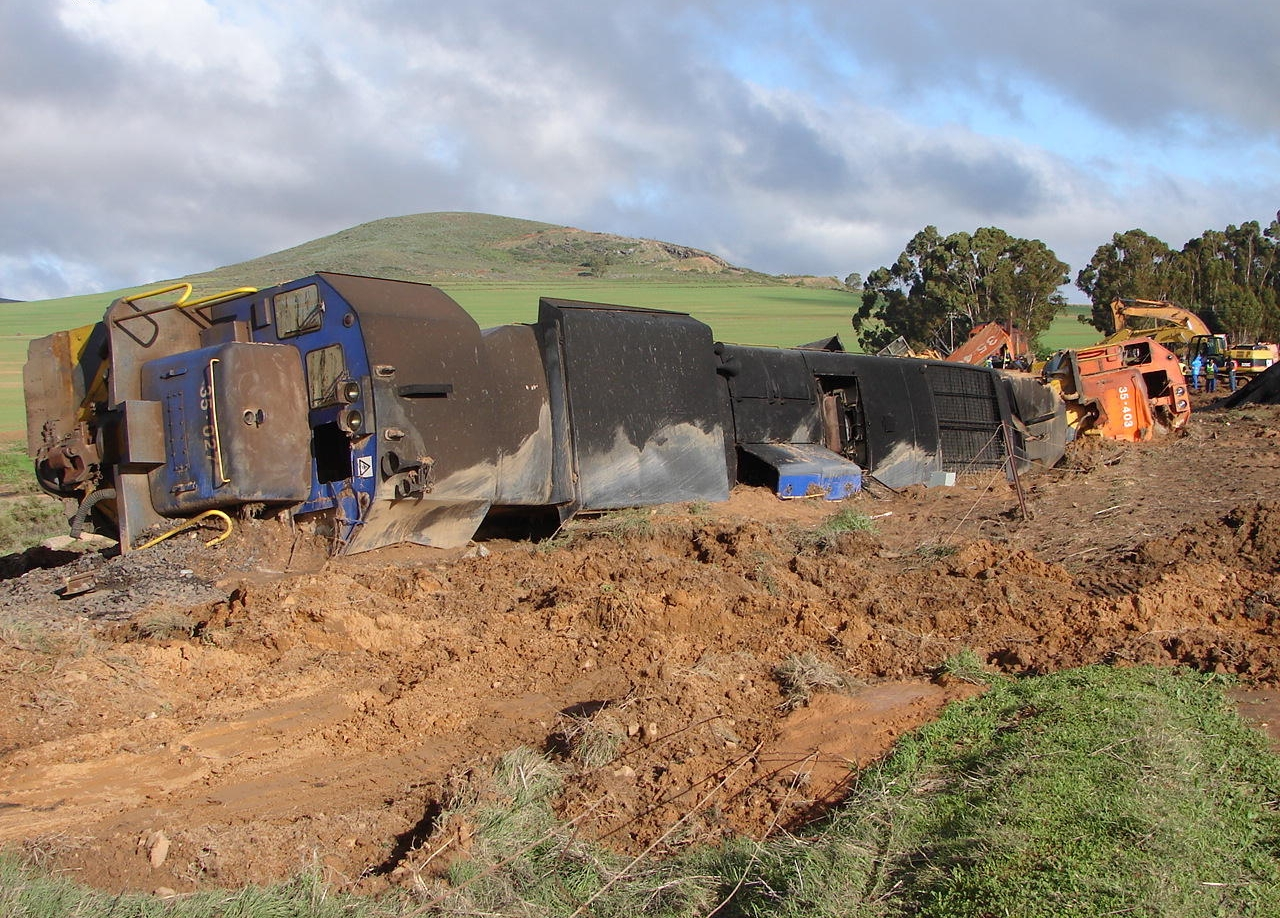
No. 35-027 in Spoornet blue livery and with a saddle hood, Biesiesfontein Farm, Moorreesburg, 9 June 2007
