= South African Class 35-400 =

1976 design of diesel-electric locomotive

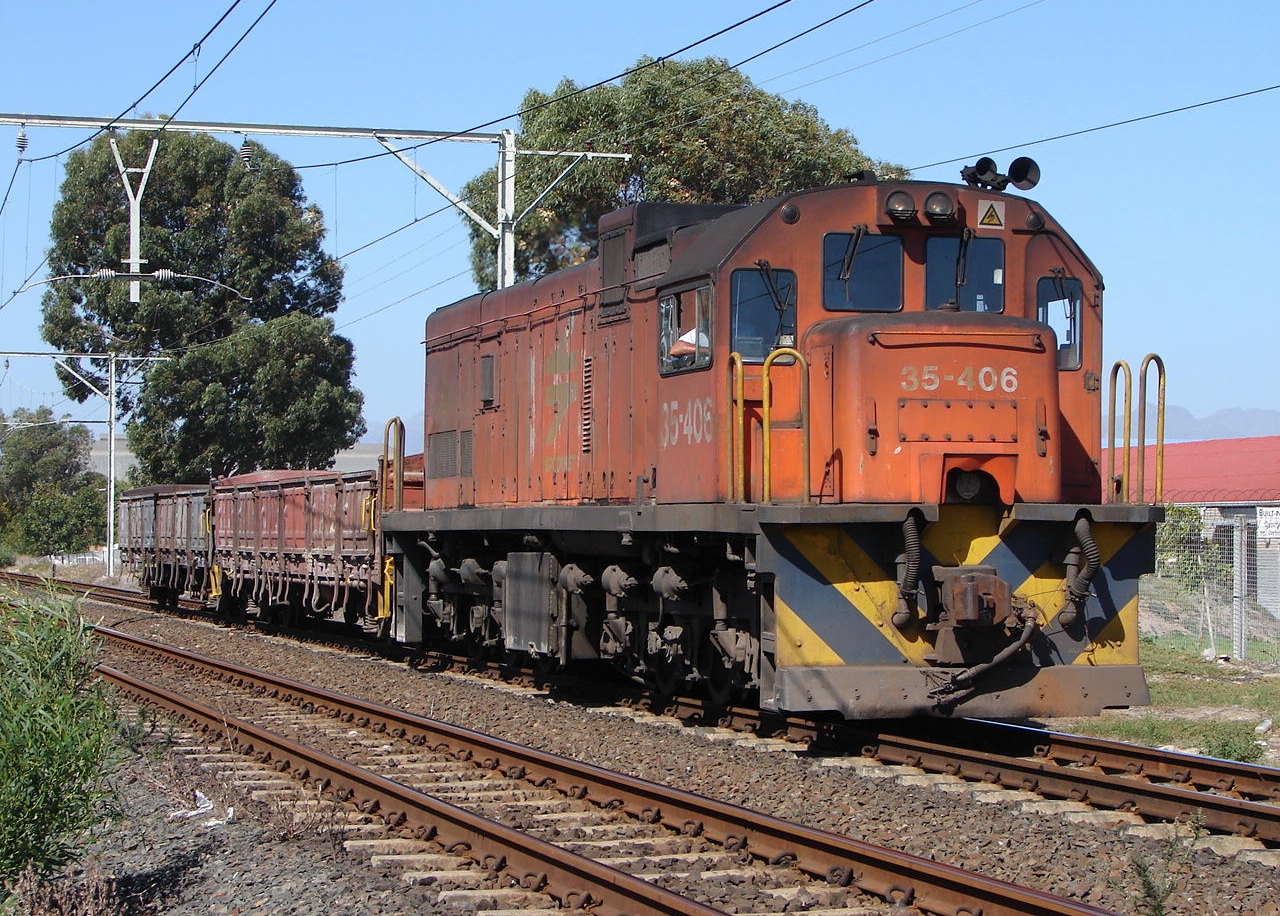
- No. 35-406 at Stikland, Bellville, 13 March 2007
Type and origin
- Power type: Diesel-electric
- Designer: General Electric
- Builder: SA GE-DL Locomotive Group
- Serial number: 40520-40569, 41300-41349
- Model: GE U15C
- Build date: 1976, 1978-1980
- Total produced: 100
Specifications
- Configuration
  - AAR: C+C
  - UIC: Co'Co'
  - Commonwealth: Co+Co
- Gauge: 3 ft 6 in (1,067 mm) Cape gauge
- Wheel diameter: 915 mm (36.0 in)
- Wheelbase: 10,782 mm (35 ft 4.5 in)
  - Bogie: 3,188 mm (10 ft 5.5 in)
- Pivot centres: 7,860 mm (25 ft 9.4 in)
- Length
  - Over couplers: 15,152 mm (49 ft 8.5 in)
- Width: 2,753 mm (9 ft 0.4 in)
- Height: 3,874 mm (12 ft 8.5 in)
- Axle load: 13,720 kg (30,250 lb)
- Adhesive weight: 82,320 kg (181,480 lb)
- Loco weight: 82,320 kg (181,480 lb)
- Fuel type: Diesel
- Fuel capacity: 2,700 litres (590 imp gal)
- Prime mover: GE 7FDL-8
- RPM range: 385-1,050
  - RPM low idle: 385
  - RPM idle: 450
  - Maximum RPM: 1,050
- Engine type: 4-stroke diesel
- Aspiration: Elliott H-584 turbocharger
- Generator: 10 pole GE 5GT-581C15
- Traction motors: Six GE 5GE-764-C1 DC 4 pole
  - Rating 1 hour: 655A
  - Continuous: 645A @ 17 km/h (11 mph)
- Cylinders: V8
- Gear ratio: 90:17
- MU working: 4 maximum
- Loco brake: 28-LAV-1 with vigilance control
- Train brakes: Westinghouse 6CDX4UC compressor/exhauster
- Air tank cap.: 740 litres (160 imp gal)
- Compressor: 0.033 m^{3}/s (1.2 cu ft/s)
- Exhauster: 0.130 m^{3}/s (4.6 cu ft/s)
- Couplers: AAR knuckle (SASKOP DS)
Performance figures
- Maximum speed: 100 km/h (62 mph)
- Power output
  - Starting: 1,230 kW (1,650 hp)
  - Continuous: 1,160 kW (1,560 hp)
- Tractive effort
  - Starting: 201 kN (45,000 lbf) @ 25% adh.
  - Continuous: 161 kN (36,000 lbf) @ 21 km/h (13 mph)
- Factor of adh.
  - Starting: 25%
  - Continuous: 20%
- Brakeforce: 60% ratio @ 345 kPa (50.0 psi)
- Dynamic brake peak effort: 138 kN (31,000 lbf) @ 28 km/h (17 mph)
Career
- Operators: South African Railways; Spoornet; Transnet Freight Rail; NLPI; Tanzania Railways
- Class: Class 35-400
- Number in class: 100
- Numbers: 35-401 to 35-500
- Delivered: 1976-1980
- First run: 1976

The South African Railways Class 35-400 of 1976 is a diesel-electric locomotive.

Between March 1976 and May 1980, the South African Railways placed one hundred Class 35-400 General Electric type U15C diesel-electric locomotives in branch line service.

== Manufacturer ==
The Class 35-400 type GE U15C diesel-electric locomotive was designed by General Electric (GE) and built for the South African Railways (SAR) by the South African General Electric-Dorman Long Locomotive Group (SA GE-DL, later Dorbyl). The first batch of fifty locomotives was delivered between March and December 1976, numbered in the range from 35–401 to 35-450. These were followed by a second batch of fifty between October 1978 and May 1980, numbered in the range from 35-451 to 35-500.

== Distinguishing features ==
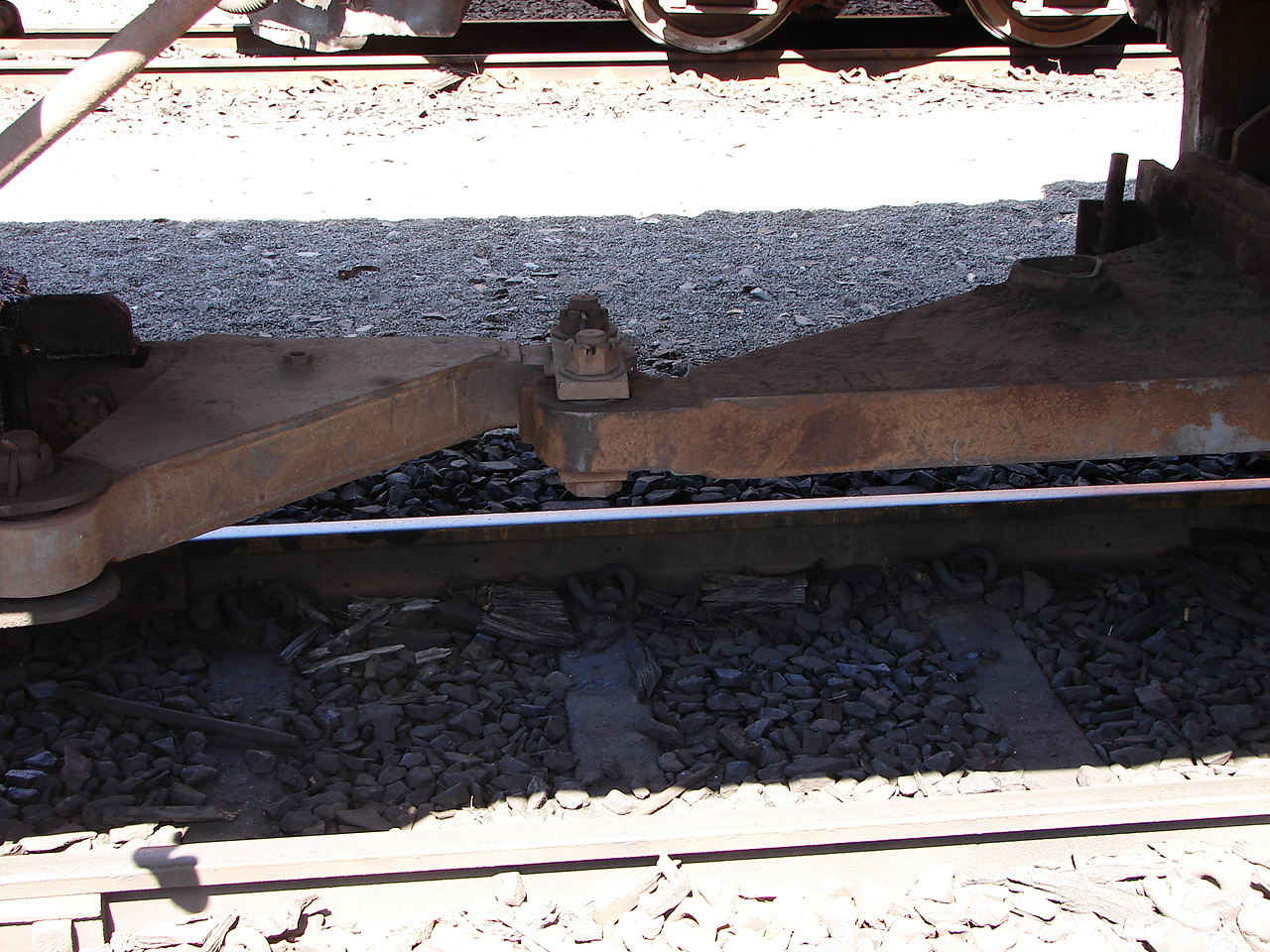
Inter-bogie linkage

The locomotive has interlinked bogies, hence the "Co+Co" wheel arrangement classification. The linkage is usually hidden from view by the saddle-shaped fuel tank.

With the two GE U15C Class 35 models, the Class 35-000 can be distinguished from the Class 35-400 by the length of the humps on their long hoods, the Class 35-000 having a hump that is more than twice as long as that of the Class 35-400. An externally visible modification which was done during major overhauls is the addition of a saddle hood astride the long hump of the Class 35-000. By 2013 this modification had been done on a large number of long-humped Class 35-000 units, but no similar modification was done on any short-humped Class 35-400.

== Service ==
=== South African Railways ===
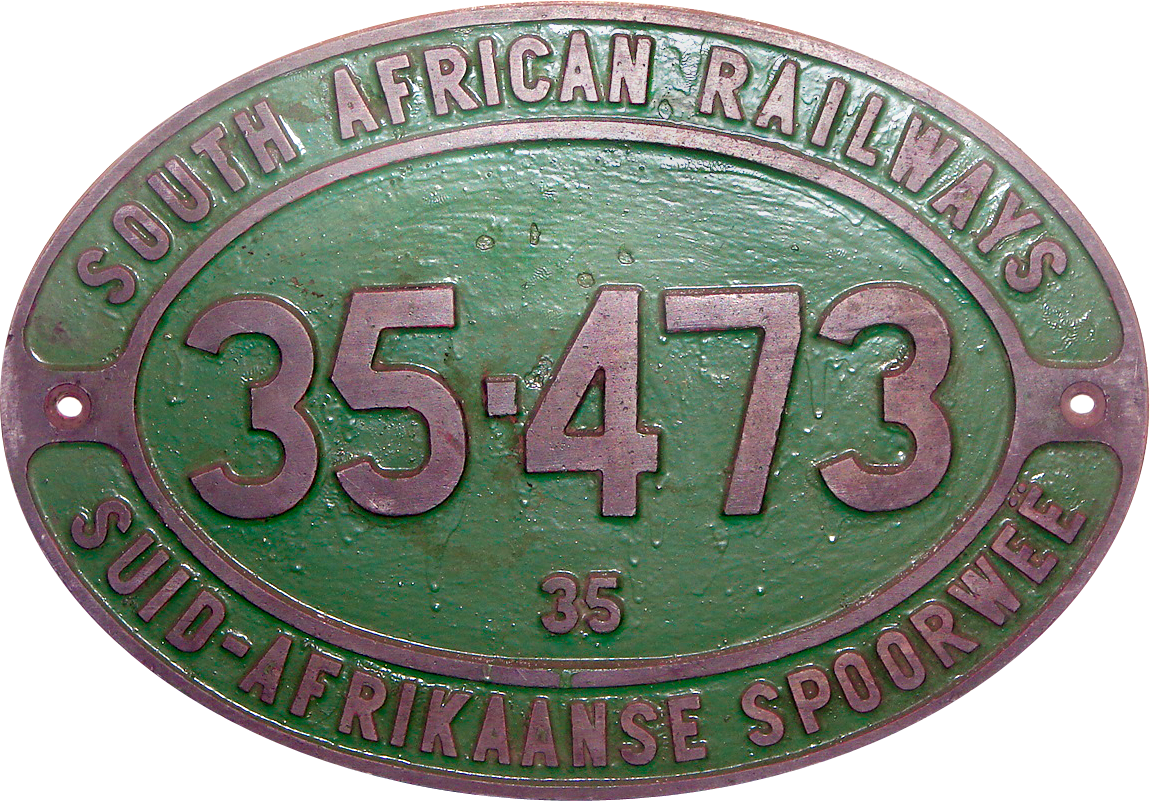

The Class 35 family is South Africa's standard branch line diesel-electric locomotive. The GE Class 35-400 was designed to operate on light rail and they work on most branch lines in the central, western, southern and southeastern parts of the country.

In the Western Cape, they work out of Bellville Depot in Cape Town on the branch lines to Bitterfontein, Saldanha and Caledon, and out of Worcester to George. Since the Ceres branch was reopened during 2012 in terms of an agreement between the Ceres Rail Company and Transnet, they also work fruit container trains in that line during the fruit season.

=== NLPI Ltd. ===
NLPI Limited, abbreviated from New Limpopo Projects Investments, is a Mauritius-registered company which specialises in private sector investments, using the build-operate-transfer (BOT) concept. It had three connected railway operations in Zimbabwe and Zambia that formed a rail link between South Africa and the Democratic Republic of Congo.

- The Beitbridge Bulawayo Railway (BBR) was commissioned on 1 September 1999 and operates the Beit Bridge to Bulawayo line in Zimbabwe.
- Since February 2004 NLPI Logistics (NLL or LOG) has been operating between Bulawayo and Victoria Falls on the Zimbabwe-Zambia border.
- Since February 2003, the Railway Systems of Zambia (RSZ) operated on the former Zambia Railways (ZR) line from Victoria Falls to Sakania in the Congo.

In Zambia, the RSZ locomotive fleet included former Zambia Railways locomotives, but the rest of the locomotive fleet of all three operations consisted of South African GM-EMD Classes 34-200, 34-600 and 34-800 and GE Classes 35-000 and 35-400 locomotives, supplied by Transnet Freight Rail (TFR). These locomotives were sometimes marked as either BBR or LOG or both, but their status, whether leased or loaned, was unclear since they were still on the TFR roster and still often worked in South Africa as well. The locomotives did not appear to be restricted to work in any one of the three operations sections and have been observed being transferred between Zimbabwe and Zambia across the bridge at Victoria Falls as required. Class 35-400 locomotives which serve with NLPI include the locomotives annotated "NLPI" in the "leased or loaned" column in the table.

Zambia Railways, the state-owned holding company, resumed control of the Zambian national rail network on 11 September 2012. This followed the Zambian government's decision to revoke the operating concession which had been awarded to RSZ after Finance Minister Alexander Chikwanda claimed that RSZ had "blatantly disregarded the provisions of the agreement" and had been "acting in a manner prejudicial to the interests of Zambians”.

=== Tanzania Railways ===
Ten Class 35-400 locomotives were leased to Tanzania Railways, where they were regauged to Metre gauge. Locomotives which served there include the ones annotated "Tanzania" in the "leased or loaned" column in the table.

=== Zaire ===
Class 35-400 locomotives were also leased to Société Nationale des Chemins de Fer Zaïrois (SNCZ) in Zaire and were occasionally used by Zambia Railways on their journey north through Zambia. This was done with the agreement of SNCZ, who stipulated that they could only haul transit traffic for Zaire. Class 35-400 locomotives which were noted in such service through Zambia were, amongst others, two unidentified locomotives at Kabwe in August 1981, no. 35–464 at Choma in May 1985, no. 35–451 at Lusaka in February 1986, and another unidentified locomotive at Lusaka in May 1990, all under power on northbound goods.

== Works numbers ==
The Class 35-400 builder's works numbers and known international deployment are listed in the table.

Class 35-400, GE type U15C
Loco no.	Works no.	Leased or Loaned
35-401	40520	NLPI
35-402	40521	NLPI
35-403	40522	
35-404	40523	
35-405	40524	NLPI
35-406	40525	NLPI
35-407	40526	NLPI
35-408	40527	
35-409	40528	
35-410	40529	
35-411	40530	
35-412	40531	
35-413	40532	
35-414	40533	
35-415	40534	
35-416	40535	
35-417	40536	
35-418	40537	
35-419	40538	
35-420	40539	
35-421	40540	
35-422	40541	
35-423	40542	
35-424	40543	
35-425	40544	
35-426	40545	
35-427	40546	
35-428	40547	
35-429	40548	NLPI
35-430	40549	
35-431	40550	NLPI
35-432	40551	NLPI
35-433	40552	
35-434	40553	NLPI
35-435	40554	
35-436	40555	NLPI
35-437	40556	
35-438	40557	
35-439	40558	
35-440	40559	
35-441	40560	
35-442	40561	
35-443	40562	
35-444	40563	
35-445	40564	
35-446	40565	
35-447	40566	
35-448	40567	
35-449	40568	
35-450	40569	
35-451	41300	SNCZ
35-452	41301	
35-453	41302	
35-454	41303	Tanzania
35-455	41304	Tanzania
35-456	41305	Tanzania
35-457	41306	Tanzania
35-458	41307	
35-459	41308	
35-460	41309	
35-461	41310	NLPI
35-462	41311	
35-463	41312	NLPI
35-464	41313	SNCZ
35-465	41314	
35-466	41315	
35-467	41316	
35-468	41317	
35-469	41318	
35-470	41319	
35-471	41320	
35-472	41321	
35-473	41322	
35-474	41323	
35-475	41324	
35-476	41325	
35-477	41326	Tanzania
35-478	41327	
35-479	41328	
35-480	41329	
35-481	41330	Tanzania
35-482	41331	
35-483	41332	Tanzania
35-484	41333	
35-485	41334	Tanzania
35-486	41335	Tanzania
35-487	41336	
35-488	41337	Tanzania
35-489	41338	
35-490	41339	
35-491	41340	
35-492	41341	
35-493	41342	
35-494	41343	
35-495	41344	
35-496	41345	
35-497	41346	
35-498	41347	
35-499	41348	
35-500	41349	

== Liveries ==
The Class 35-000 were all delivered in the SAR Gulf Red livery with signal red buffer beams, yellow side stripes on the long hood sides and a yellow V on each end. In the 1990s many of the Class 35-400 units began to be repainted in the Spoornet orange livery with a yellow and blue chevron pattern on the buffer beams. In the late 1990s many were repainted once again, this time in the Spoornet blue livery with outline numbers on the long hood sides. After 2008 in the Transnet Freight Rail (TFR) era many were repainted in the TFR red, green and yellow livery.

== Illustration ==
The last picture below shows the roof of a Class 35-400 U15C locomotive. It was involved in a major derailment near Moorreesburg on 7 June 2007 after the track roadbed was washed away during heavy rain and flooding.

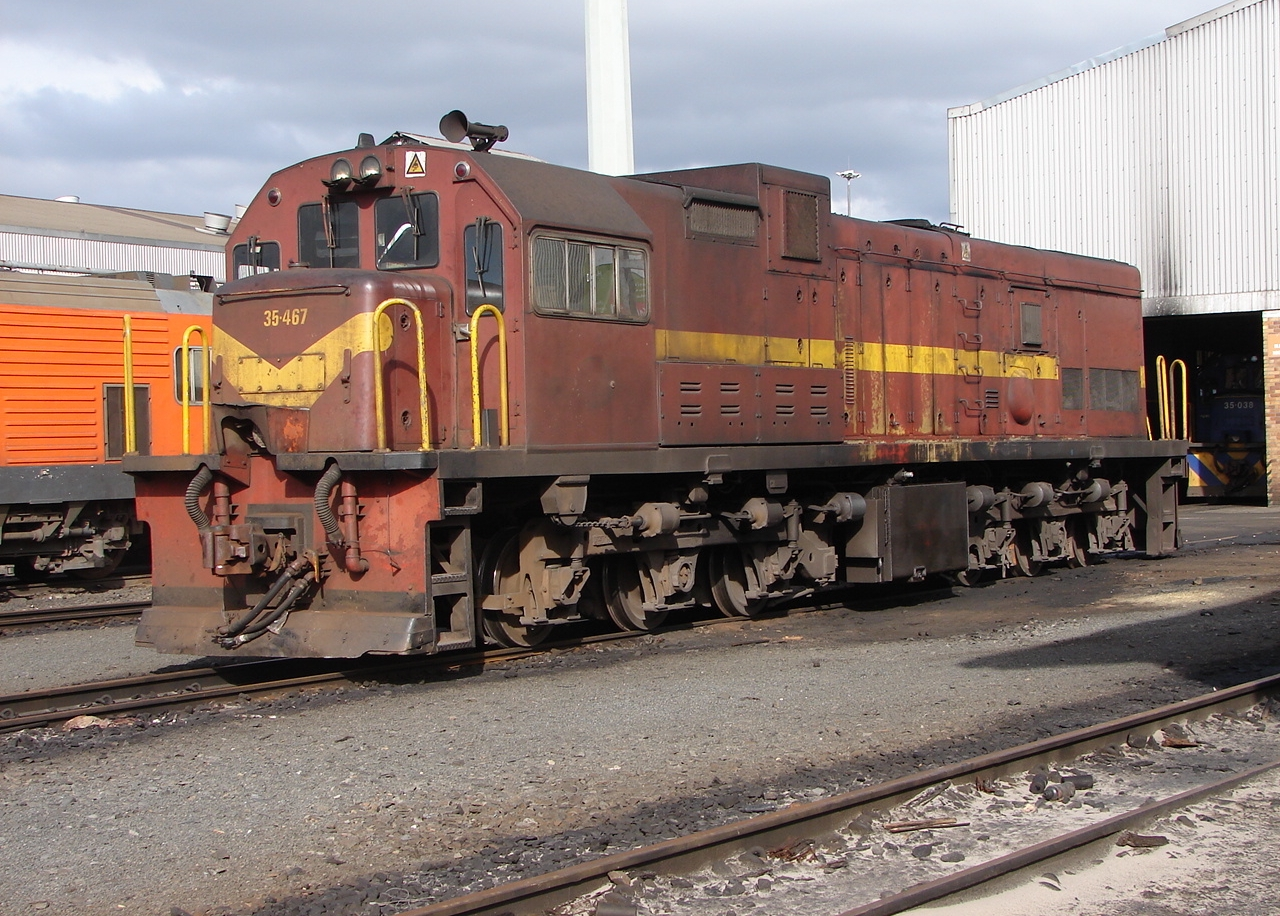
No. 35–467 in SAR Gulf Red and yellow whiskers livery, Bellville loco depot, Cape Town, 24 May 2009

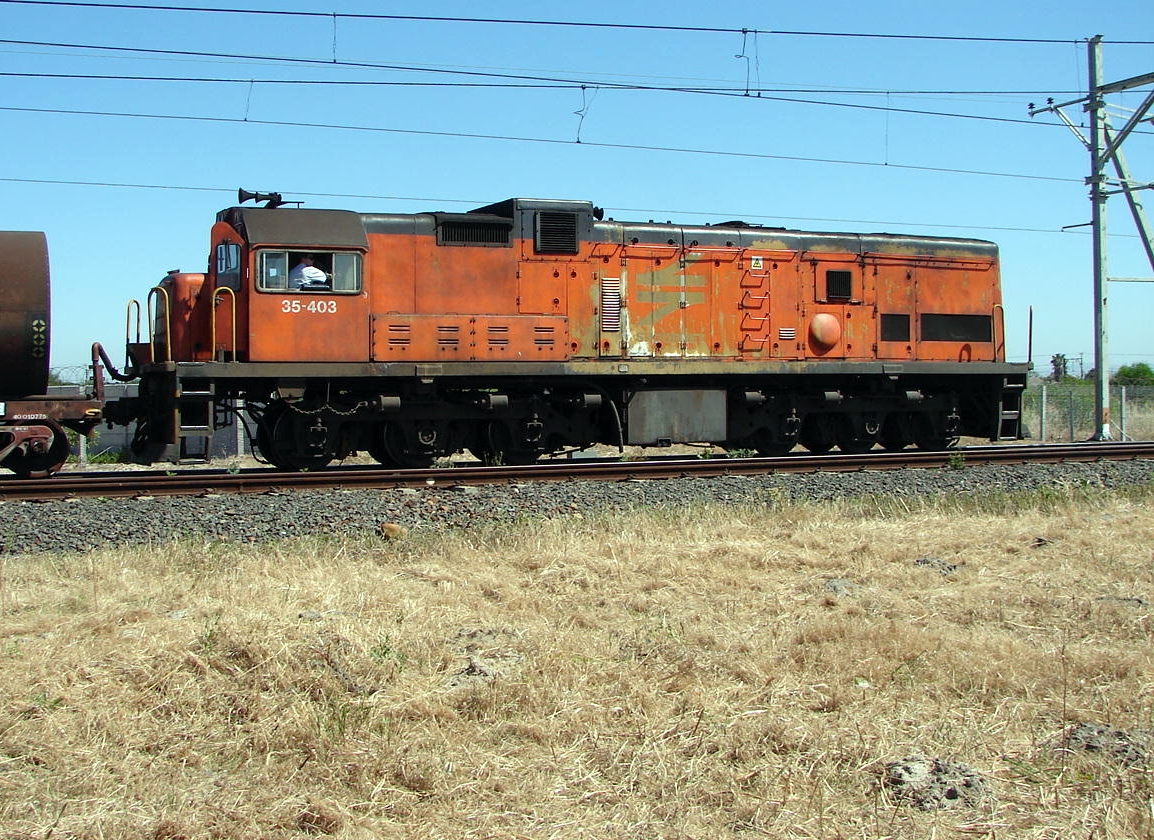
No. 35–403 in an early version of Spoornet's orange with a wide gray top edge, Stikland, 19 October 2006

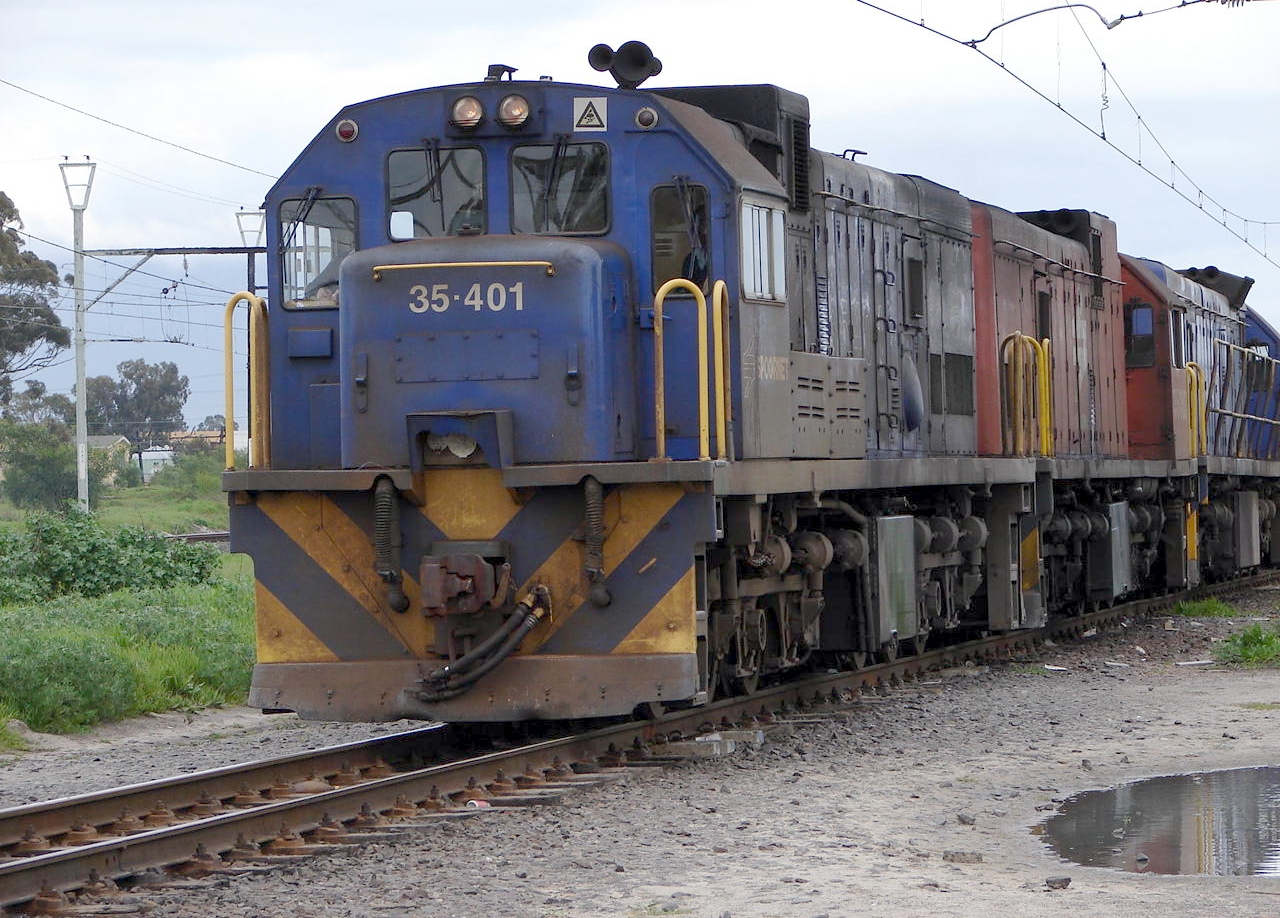
No. 35–401 in Spoornet blue livery with outline numbers, Stikland, Cape Town, 16 August 2006

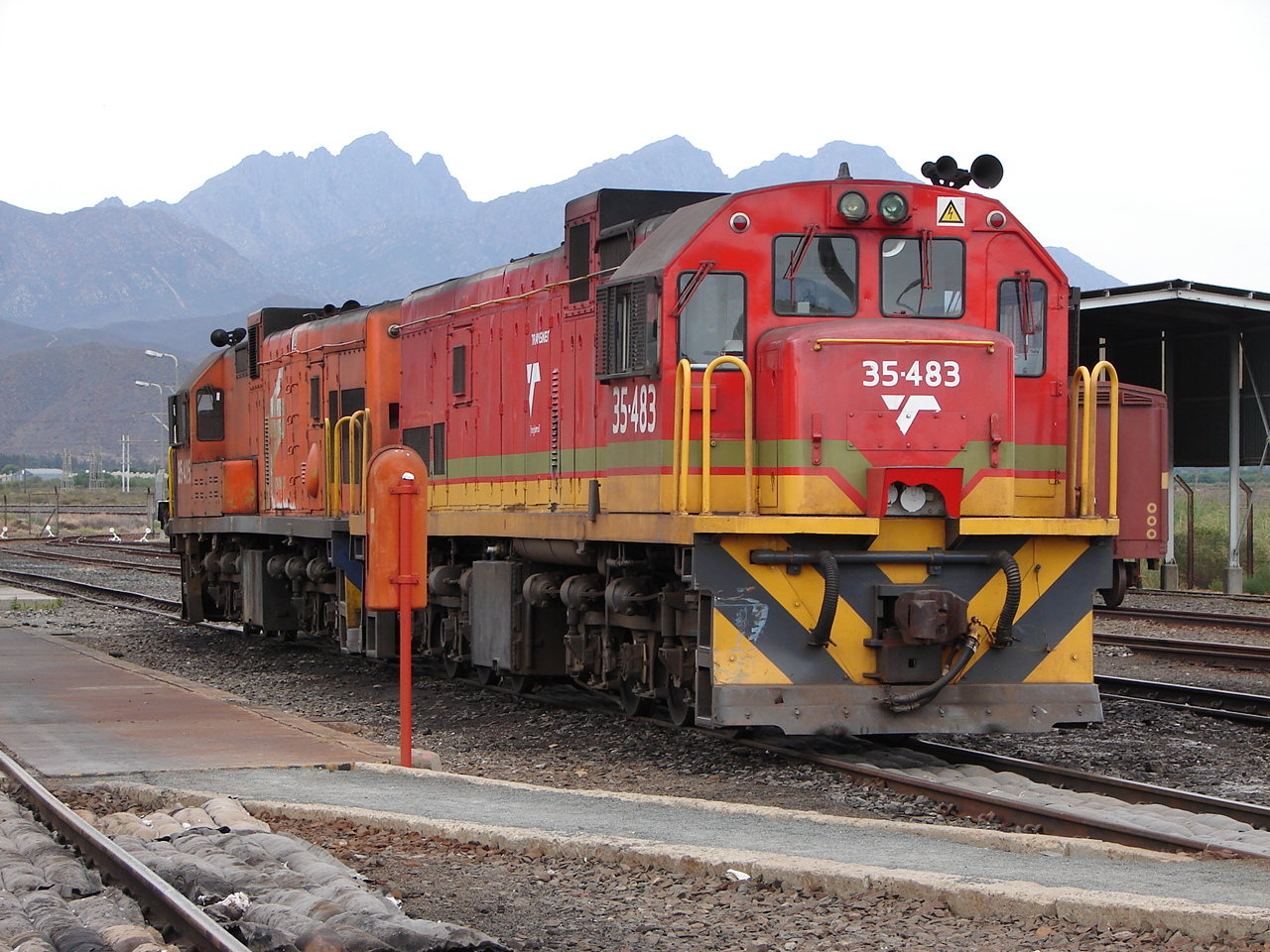
No. 35–483 in Transnet Freight Rail livery, Worcester Depot, Western Cape, 26 March 2013

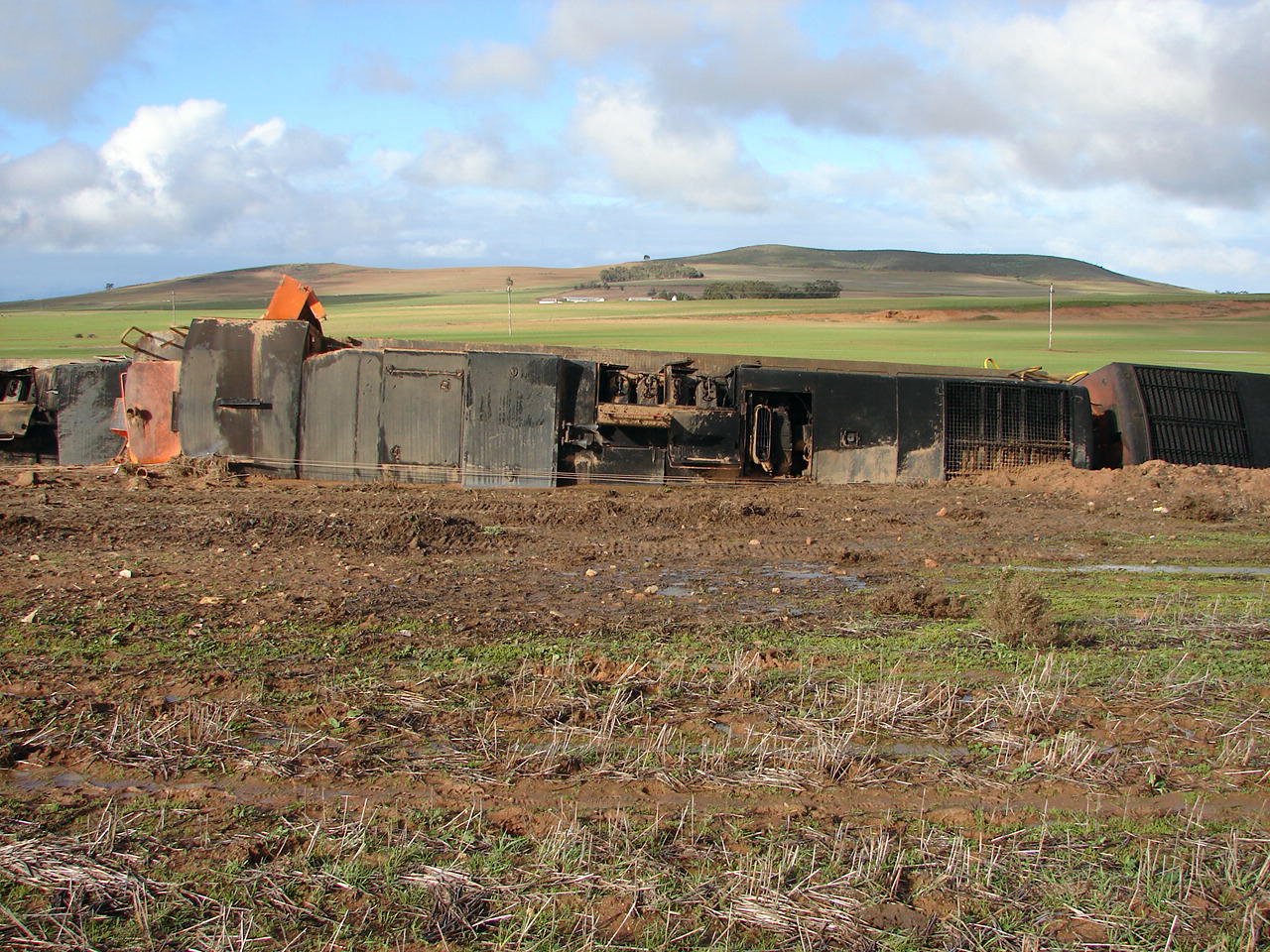
No. 35–403 in Spoornet orange livery at Biesiesfontein Farm outside Moorreesburg, 9 June 2007

== External video link ==
External videos
- In March 2017, we follow a quartet of vintage 35 Class diesels going about their daily work on the spectacular Cape Town to Caledon and Klipdale railway. The 35s pick up a load from Klipdale and work their way back towards Cape Town. After dropping wagons at Caledon, the 35s make their way through the tight curves and grades, with final shots watching the train ascend the tortuous curves of Houwhoek Pass. Numbers 35-467, 35-034, 35-483 & 35-043, Trevor Staats, March 2017 (5m 28s)
