= 1968 in South Africa =

- Decades: 1940s; 1950s; 1960s; 1970s; 1980s
- See also: List of years in South Africa

The following lists events that happened during 1968 in South Africa.

== Incumbents ==
- State President:
  - Tom Naudé (acting until 9 April).
  - Jim Fouché (from 10 April).
- Prime Minister: John Vorster.
- Chief Justice: Lucas Cornelius Steyn.

== Events ==
January

- 1 – Magnus Malan is appointed as Officer Commanding of the Military Academy in Saldanha.

April

- 10 – Jacobus Johannes Fouché becomes the 3rd State President of South Africa.
- 20 – A South African Airways Boeing 707 crashes after take-off from Windhoek, killing 122 of the 129 on board.
- 30 – The bill establishing five universities for Blacks comes into force.

Unknown date

- The Liberal Party of South Africa is banned by the government.
- Dorothy Nyembe is arrested for the second time and charged under the Suppression of Communism Act.
- In the Villa Peri campaign, the Azanian People's Liberation Army tries to infiltrate members into South Africa via Botswana and Mozambique.
- The South African Bureau of State Security is formed independently of the South African Police, accountable to the Prime Minister.

October

- South Africa withdraw from the British Commonwealth of Nations cutting full ties with Britain.

== Births ==
- 22 February – Camilla Waldman, actress
- 29 February – Suanne Braun, actress
- 5 March – Lindani Nkosi, actor
- 8 April – Paseka Motsoeneng, Televangelist
- 28 April – Andy Flower, Zimbabwean cricketer
- 17 May – Mickey Arthur, cricket player and coach
- 30 June – Rebecca Malope, gospel singer & TV host
- 4 September – Daniel Mudau, football player
- 16 September – Loren Wulfsohn, synchronized swimmer
- 23 September – Zane Moosa, football player
- 25 December – Andrew Tucker, football player

== Deaths ==
- 7 January – J.L.B. Smith, ichthyologist (b. 1897).
- 10 January – Eben Dönges, politician and elected State President (b. 1898).
- 21 June 21 – Constance Georgina Tardrew, South African botanist (b. 1883).

== Railways ==
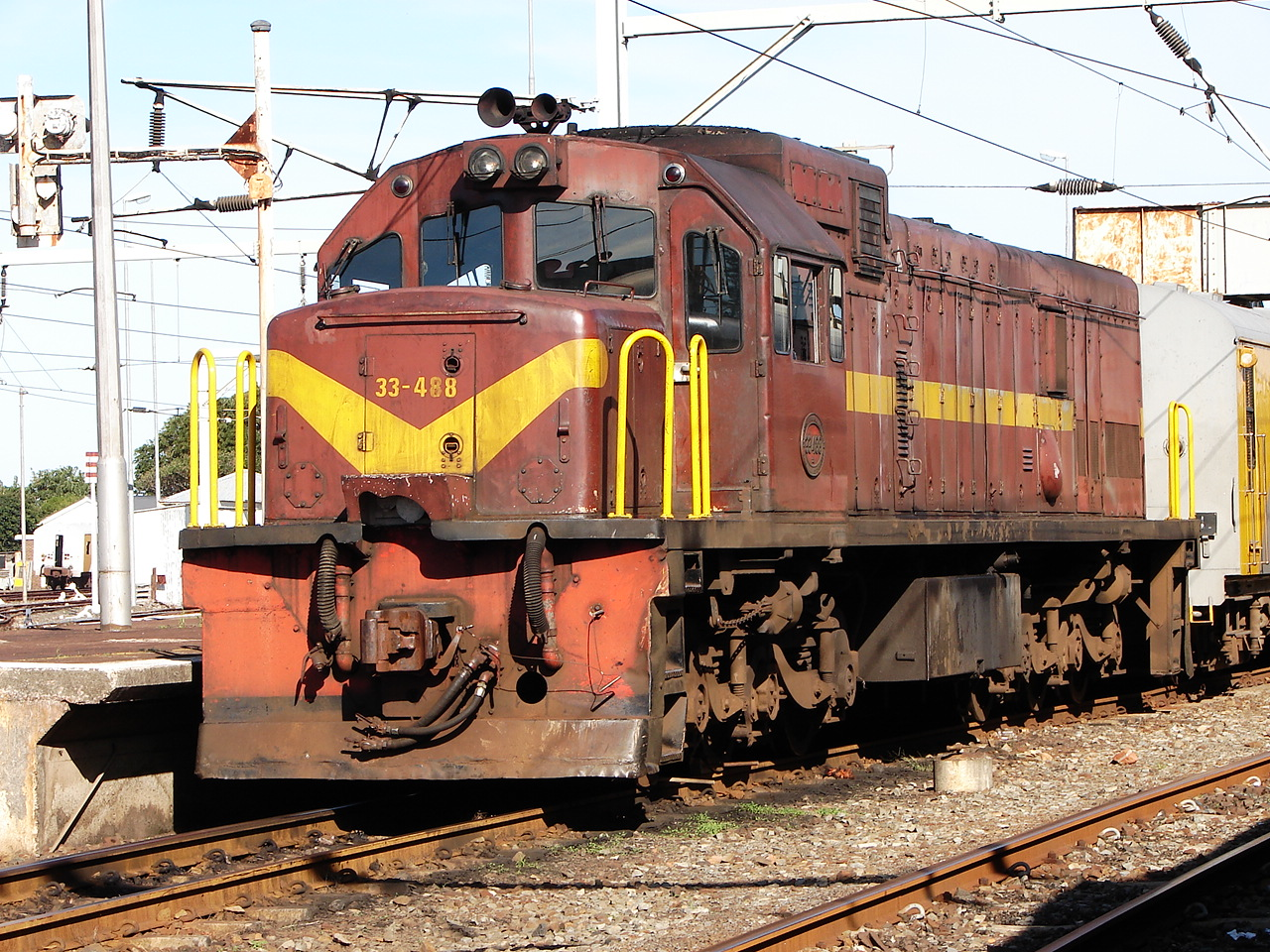
Class 33-400 (GE U20C)

=== Locomotives ===
- In July, the South African Railways places the first of 115 Class 33-400 General Electric type U20C diesel-electric locomotives in service in South West Africa.

== Sports ==
- 17 September – The Marylebone Cricket Club tour of South Africa is cancelled when South Africa refuses to accept the presence of Basil D'Oliveira in the side.
