= 1973 in South Africa =

- Decades: 1950s; 1960s; 1970s; 1980s; 1990s
- See also: List of years in South Africa

The following lists events that happened during 1973 in South Africa.

== Incumbents ==
- State President: Jim Fouché.
- Prime Minister: John Vorster.
- Chief Justice: Newton Ogilvie Thompson.

== Events ==
January

- 8 – Two South African policemen are killed and two injured in an explosion near the Zambezi River in north-western Rhodesia.
- 9 – the first strike of the 1973 Durban strikes occurs

February

- 1 – Venda and Gazankulu are granted self-government.

March

- Steve Biko is banned by the government.

July

- 7 – Afrikaner Resistance Movement was founded in Ventersdorp

August

- 25 – Harry Schwarz wins the leadership of the United Party in the Transvaal, replacing Marais Steyn.

Unknown date

- The Natal Parks Board starts buying up farms to form the Itala Game Reserve.
- Michael Lapsley, an Anglican priest, arrives in South Africa.
- African and Arab states impose an oil embargo on South Africa.

== Births ==
- 22 January – Brandon Silent, football player & coach.
- 13 February – Dino Quattrocecere, figure skater.
- 1 March – Robert Marawa, sports journalist, sports commentator, television presenter and radio host.
- 5 March – Dumisa Ngobe, football player
- 8 March – Jill Brukman, backstroke and medley swimmer.
- 20 March – Nicky Boje, cricketer.
- 15 April – Werner Swanepoel, rugby player.
- 10 May – Ollie Le Roux, rugby player.
- 31 May – Amanda Taylor, synchronized swimmer.
- 16 July – Shaun Pollock, former cricketer & commentator.
- 19 July – Nathalie Boltt, actress.
- 29 July – AJ Venter, rugby player.
- 25 August – Nico Panagio, actor & tv presenter.
- 18 September – Mark Shuttleworth, entrepreneur and space tourist.
- 29 October – Adam Bacher, cricketer.
- 31 October – Cobus Visagie, rugby player.
- 18 November – Michele MacNaughton, field hockey player.
- 27 November – Sharlto Copley, producer, actor, and director.
- 29 November – Raphael Smith, screenwriter and songwriter.
- 16 December – Themba Mnguni, football player.
- 1 June – Vanitha Chetty, Athlete.

== Deaths ==
- 21 February – Cecil Kellaway, actor. (b. 1890)

== Railways ==
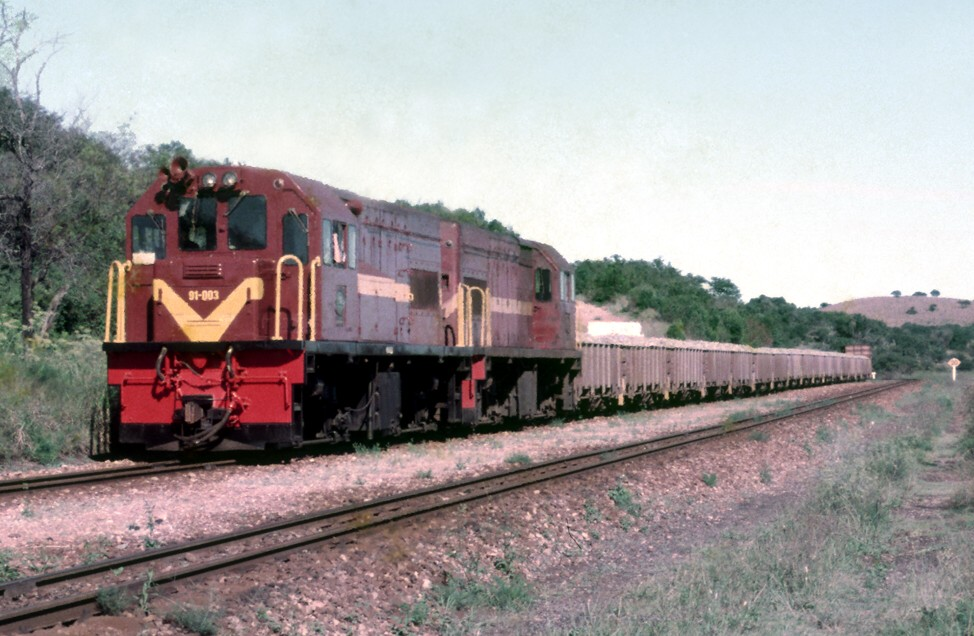
Class 91-000 (GE UM6B)

=== Locomotives ===
Two new Cape gauge and one narrow gauge locomotive types enter service on the South African Railways:

- April – The first of one hundred Class 34-400 General Electric (GE) type U26C diesel-electric locomotives.
- The first of one hundred Class 6E1, Series 4 electric locomotives.
- September–December – Twenty Class 91-000 GE type UM6B narrow gauge diesel-electric locomotives on the Avontuur Railway.
