= 1971 in South Africa =

- Decades: 1950s; 1960s; 1970s; 1980s; 1990s
- See also: List of years in South Africa

The following lists events that happened during 1971 in South Africa.

== Incumbents ==
- State President: Jim Fouché
- Prime Minister: John Vorster
- Chief Justice: Lucas Cornelius Steyn, then Newton Ogilvie Thompson

== Events ==
February

- 27 – The oil tanker Wafra grounds near Cape Agulhas, causing considerable environmental damage.

March

- 10 – Two Buccaneer aircraft of 24 Squadron SAAF, prescribed to by Headquarters, attempt to sink SS Wafra with AS-30 missiles but succeeds only in starting a fire.
- 12 – A Shackleton aircraft of 35 Squadron SAAF, not prescribed to by Headquarters, sinks SS Wafra in 6,000 feet (1,829 metres) of water using depth charges.

Unknown date

- St Lucia Lake and the turtle beaches and coral reefs of Maputaland are listed by the Convention on Wetlands of International Importance (RAMSAR).
- The International Court of Justice gives an advisory opinion supporting the view of the United Nations for South Africa to relinquish control of South West Africa.
- Kamuzu Banda, president of Malawi, is the first Black President to visit South Africa.

== Births ==
- 20 February – Joost van der Westhuizen, rugby scrum-half (d. 2017)
- 3 March – Jet Novuka, actor
- 15 March – Naka Drotské, rugby player
- 8 April – Fikile Mbalula, national minister
- 22 April – Jannie de Beer, rugby player
- 13 May – Fana Mokoena, actor
- 28 June – Elon Musk, South African-born Canadian-American entrepreneur, engineer, inventor and investor
- 21 July – Robby Brink, rugby player
- 30 July – Mzukisi Sikali, triple world champion boxer (d. 2005)
- 4 September – Lance Klusener, cricket player
- 15 September – Wayne Ferreira, tennis player
- 28 September – Braam van Straaten, rugby player
- 8 October – Krynauw Otto, rugby player
- 22 October – Amanda Coetzer, tennis player
- 26 October – Brendan Augustine, soccer player
- 12 November – Gert Thys, long-distance runner
- 14 November – Nick Boraine, actor
- 29 November – Esme Kruger, lawn bowler
- 3 December – Pieter Rossouw, rugby player
- 17 December – Alan Khan, media and radio personality

== Deaths ==
- 27 October – Ahmed Timol, activist and political leader. (b. 1941)

== Railways ==
=== Locomotives ===
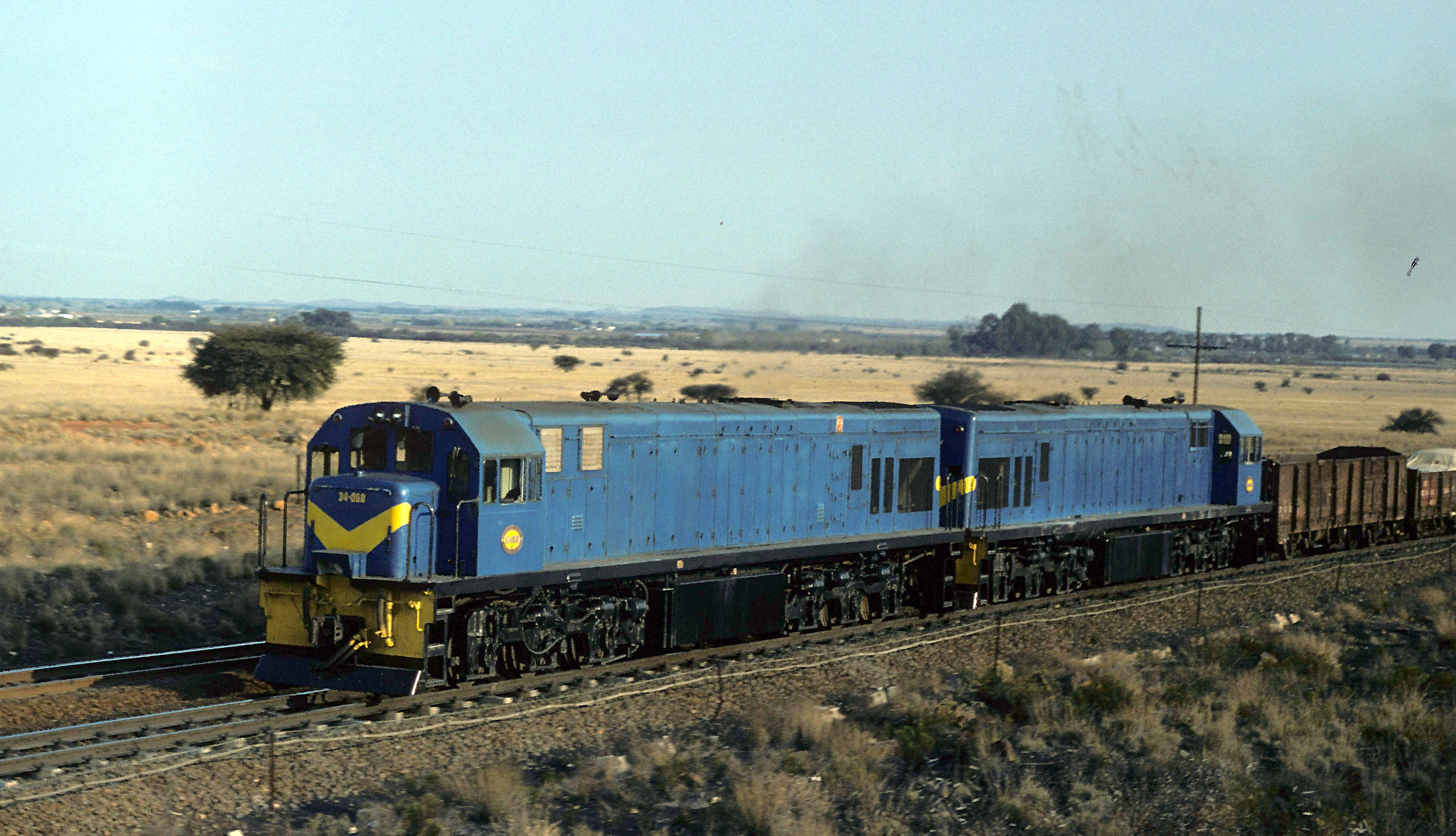
Class 34-000 (GE U26C)

Four new Cape gauge locomotive types enter service on the South African Railways:

- July – The first of 125 Class 34-000 General Electric type U26C diesel-electric locomotives.
- October – The first of fifty Class 34-200 General Motors Electro-Motive Division type GT26MC diesel-electric locomotives.
- Fifty Class 6E1, Series 2 electric locomotives.
- The first of one hundred and fifty Class 6E1, Series 3 locomotives.
