= 1976 in South Africa =

- Decades: 1950s; 1960s; 1970s; 1980s; 1990s
- See also: List of years in South Africa

The following lists events that happened during 1976 in South Africa.

== Incumbents ==
- State President: Nico Diederichs.
- Prime Minister: John Vorster.
- Chief Justice: Frans Lourens Herman Rumpff.

== Events ==
January

- 5 – The SABC begins the country's first television service.

March

- 27 – The South African Defence Force withdraws from Angola and concludes Operation Savannah.

May

- 29 – Eskom announces that it will order two nuclear power stations from France.

June

- 16 – Student riots break out in Soweto and Hector Pieterson, Hastings Ndlovu and two white officials of the West Rand Board are some of the casualties.
- 23 – Prime Minister John Vorster and United States Secretary of State Henry Kissinger hold talks in West Germany over the Rhodesian issue.

August

- 25–26 – Prime Minister John Vorster and President of Zambia Kenneth Kaunda meet at Victoria Falls.

September

- 13 – The Cillié Commission of Inquiry into the 16 June riots in Soweto begins.
- 30 – Michael Lapsley, Anglican priest and social activist, arrives in Lesotho after his visa was not renewed in South Africa.

October

- 26 – Transkei gains independence from South Africa.

Unknown date

- Umkhonto we Sizwe's central operations headquarters is established and the process of establishing training camps in Angola begins with the establishment of Gabela Training Camp.

== Births ==
- 16 January – Jonathan Solomons, South African football player
- 20 January – Ian Syster, long-distance runner (d. 2004)
- 30 January – Kaya Malotana, former rugby player & tv rugby analyst
- February – Johan Thom, visual artist
- 9 February – Colin Moss, actor and TV host
- 22 February – Faan Rautenbach, rugby player
- 2 March – Gaffie du Toit, rugby player
- 5 March – Wayne Denne, field hockey player
- 11 March – Black Coffee (DJ), DJ and record producer
- 30 March – Chantal Botts, badminton player
- 31 March – Thandiswa Mazwai, singer & songwriter
- 2 April – Rory Sabbatini, golfer
- 5 April – David Staniforth, field hockey goalkeeper
- 20 April – Calvin Marlin, football player
- 25 April – Breyton Paulse, rugby player
- 19 May – Zuluboy, rapper & actor
- 12 June – Stewart Carson, badminton player
- 3 July – Bobby Skinstad, Springboks captain
- 1 August – Lucky Lekgwathi, football player
- 24 August – DJ Tira, DJ, Record Producer and Businessman, founder of Afrotainment
- 11 September – Vuyo Dabula, actor
- 13 September – Linda Sokhulu, actress
- 3 October – Carl Beukes, actor
- 14 October – Tokollo Tshabalala, Kwaito musician, most well-known for being a member of music group TKzee
- 19 November – Jane Kurz, synchronised swimmer
- 3 December – Mark Boucher, cricketer
- 15 December – Kabelo Mabalane, Kwaito musician, TV personality & Pastor
- 30 December – Ashley Callie, actress (d. 2008)

== Deaths ==
- 19 March – Stuart Cloete, novelist, essayist and biographer (b. 1897)
- 26 April – Sid James, South African-born British actor (b. 1913)
- 16 June – Melville Edelstein, sociologist, killed due to Soweto uprising (b. 1919)
- 16 June – Hastings Ndlovu, Soweto uprising casualty (b. 1961)
- 16 June – Hector Pieterson, Soweto uprising casualty (b. 1963)
- 9 September – Ivan Mitford-Barberton, sculptor, writer and herald (b. 1896)
- 6 November – Sydney Skaife, entomologist and naturalist (b. 1889)

== Railways ==
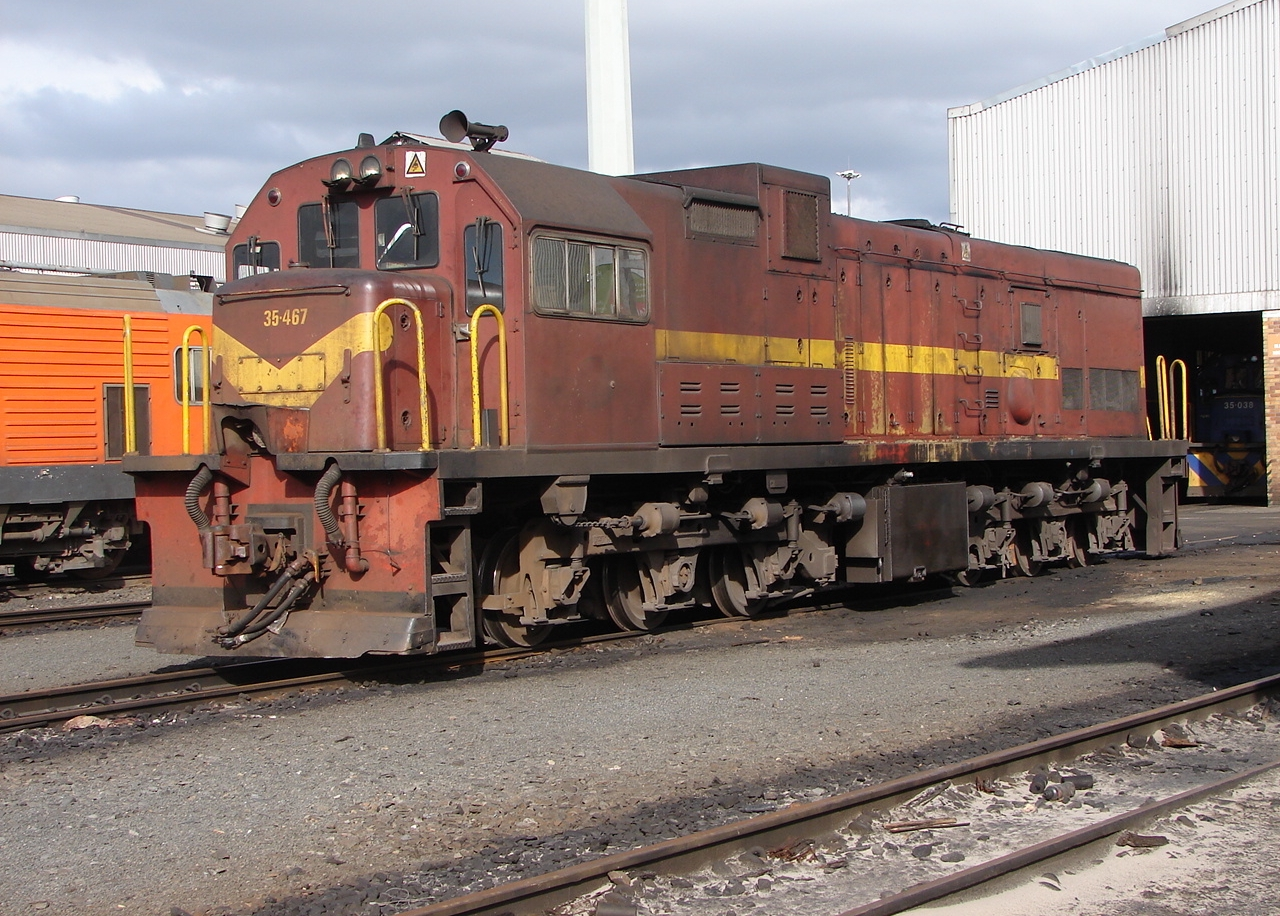
Class 35-400 (GE U15C)

=== Locomotives ===
Three new Cape gauge locomotive types enter service on the South African Railways:

- March – The first of one hundred Class 35-400 General Electric type U15C diesel-electric locomotives.
- September – The first of one hundred Class 35-600 General Motors Electro-Motive Division type GT18MC diesel-electric locomotives.
- The first of one hundred Class 6E1, Series 6 electric locomotives.

== See also ==
- 1976 in South African television
