= S v Zinn =

South African legal case

S v Zinn, an important case in South African criminal law, was heard in the Appellate Division by Steyn CJ, Ogilvie Thompson JA and Rumpff JA on March 21, 1969, with judgment handed down on March 31. H. Snitcher QC appeared for the appellant; for the state, AJ Lategan. The case is most often cited for its provision of a basic triad of sentencing considerations: the crime, the criminal and the interests of society.

== Facts ==
In 1956 a furniture-manufacturing company, Lola Zinn Furniture (Pty) Ltd, was registered with Zinn and one Smith, an illiterate man, as equal shareholders and directors. One hundred shares of R2 each were issued to the shareholders. Smith supervised labour and machinery, while responsibility for sales and all financial matters lay with Zinn, who was also both secretary and public officer of the company.

As the company was under-capitalised from the beginning, Zinn borrowed heavily and continuously from money-lending institutions, commonly known as "shippers." He began to borrow

- in 1958 from a company later called Allied National Corporation (SA) (Pty) Ltd;
- from 1961 from MH Goldschmidt (Pty) Ltd; and
- in 1965 from Neville Griffin and Company.

To each of these firms, Zinn would present the annual balance sheet of Lola Zinn Furniture, together with the manufacturing account, the profit-and-loss account for the previous year, and, on the face of the balance sheet, the audit certificate and a signature purporting to be that of the company's auditor. These accounts were false. Of the company's trading and assets, they presented "a completely wrong picture."

In order to obtain the required loans, Zinn had to satisfy the shippers that the money was being used for purchases of material. He was required to supply them with proof of genuine purchases, which he purported to do by way of statements reflecting such purchases, using paper with the letter heads of various firms and typing false figures on these in his factory. He then handed these counterfeits to the shippers.

Zinn also obtained overdraft facilities for the company at Standard Bank by using the same false balance sheets. In 1965 and 1966 the bank assisted the company by discounting bills and promissory notes from two furnishing companies. Not only was the bank not informed that these bills and notes were in fact accommodation bills; Zinn also fraudulently entered false invoice numbers on these bills in order to present evidence of their being genuine trade bills and notes—the Bank being prohibited from discounting accommodation bills.

Although the company showed a small annual profit up to 1961, it was run at a loss thereafter which became progressively worse. In 1963 it was R28,017.52; in 1964 R41,804.14. No balance sheet could be obtained for the year ending 1965. Zinn was pressed for more than a year to reduce his stock, "which of course was largely imaginary," but every time came forward with "a very good excuse for not doing so."

In 1966 "the company crashed and its factory literally went up in smoke." The actual losses incurred by the shippers were as follows:

- Allied National Corporation—R64,509.77
- MH Goldschmidt & Co.—R242,110
- Neville Griffin & Co.—R63,766.17

The total was R370,385.94. The amount obtained by way of overdraft facilities from Standard Bank was R612,309. Although the bank was paid the amounts owing to it, sureties who signed in respect of those facilities lost R18,000, while the furniture firms who issued the accommodation bills lost R25,631.29.

Over the period from June 30, 1964 to June 30, 1966, at a time when Zinn knew that the company was "hopelessly insolvent," he incurred debts for it totalling R648,177, including amounts borrowed from the shippers. Finally, between 1961 and 1966, he stole furniture from the company which he sold for his own benefit, the value of which was R40,609.22.

== Court a quo ==
Charged in the Cape of Good Hope Provincial Division with

- 63 counts of fraud;
- 291 counts of theft; and
- a count of contravening the Insolvency Act,

Zinn, aged fifty-eight, pleaded guilty to, and was found guilty,

- fourteen counts of fraud;
- 221 counts of theft; and
- the one count of contravening the Act.

He gave no evidence in support of a plea for mitigation, so a specialist physician was called to testify on his behalf about his health. The physician stated that he had examined Zinn for the first time in 1966. His past history showed that he had been treated for about six years from 1930 for pulmonary tuberculosis. The 1966 examination showed that he had a condition called bronchiectasis, due to the prior lung disease. His lung tissue was lacking in aeration, while the bronchi had dilated and become pockets of infection, causing him to suffer recurring attacks of haemoptysis. He also suffered pulmonary disability in that he wheezed and became short of breath on the slightest effort. His condition was chronic and would not improve unless surgical treatment was given. In the opinion of the physician, Zinn might stay as he was, suffering small but repeated haemoptysis, and yet live quite a long life; alternatively, the condition might erupt in a severe haemoptysis, which could be fatal. There might also be a deterioration by secondary infection. It would therefore be advisable, the physician suggested, for Zinn to remain under medical attention. The physician conceded that, if freed from business worries, his condition might improve.

Beyers JP sentenced him to fifteen years imprisonment, remarking that H. Snitcher QC, counsel for Zinn, had given "a stirring address," in which he had stressed, among other things, that the money had been taken not from innocents but from businessmen well able to look after themselves. Beyers held that this was "not entirely the correct picture." In general, he noted, commercial activity rests on confidence, that "behind business men are thousands and thousands of little men" who suffer if business suffers through lack of confidence; that behind the manufacturer of furniture there are the men who feed their wives and children; and that,

if confidence in business of this kind is shattered, it means less food on the plate for those thousands of little men. This is not a case of just financial wolves—the one eating the other—this is a crime, a series of crimes, which go to the very basis of the financing and the development of an industry which gives employment to thousands of people in this country.

Noting that Zinn was "no longer young, although not entirely old," Beyers said that he had nonetheless to consider the deliberate falsification of statements over a period of years:

This whole case reeks of deliberate, calculated, dishonesty; deliberate, calculated falsification and I cannot allow, I cannot allow that society, the whole of it, could be exploited by men to their own advantage. If this were to be allowed, if the fact that a man is no longer young, if the fact that a man now and then spits blood from his bronchial tubes is to be an excuse, then the whole of our business life, the whole of our society and economic structure, the many small people who live in this community, must suffer, must suffer a shattering crack and business and industry in this city will stop.

== Argument ==
Zinn appealed to the Appellate Division against his sentence. It was argued on his behalf, inter alia, that the trial judge had overestimated the effects of the crime and underestimated the appellant's personal circumstances. Beyers J had misdirected himself, in other words, in that his approach to sentencing had been coloured by irrelevant considerations, in that

- he did not have a proper regard to the appellant's health and age; and
- his reaction had generally been coloured by emotional extravagance.

It was submitted in the alternative that the sentence was excessively severe, given the following factors:

- the age of the appellant;
- his state of health;
- his having been subjected to a crippling interest burden;
- the apparent fact, gathered from the balance sheets, that a vigilant shipper ought to have realised that the company's borrowings were excessive in light of its turnover.

On the question of misdirection, it was submitted that the reference in the judgment on sentence to "thousands of little men who must suffer" was irrelevant: There was no evidence at all that "thousands of little men" had suffered.

== Judgment ==
Rumpff JA conceded in his judgment (Steyn CJ and Ogilvie Thompson JA concurring) that it was true that there was no evidence that many employees had been thrown out on to the streets because of the collapse of the company. If, however, it was realised that Beyers's remarks had been made, "in reply as it were," to the suggestion that those who suffered most were "loan sharks," the reference to "thousands of little men" must have been intended to "emphasise the potential damage that could be caused, by the type of fraud committed by the appellant, to employees of furniture manufacturers."

The reference to Zinn as a man, no longer young, who "spits blood from his bronchial tubes," was the only reference in Beyers's judgment on sentence to Zinn's age and malady. Having regard to the context in which the reference was made, Rumpff was "driven to the conclusion that the learned Judge-President considered the crimes committed to be of such magnitude that, if any weight were given to the personal circumstances of the appellant, business and industry in the whole of Cape Town would come to a disastrous end." In Rumpff's view, this was

not merely the strongly worded but justified condemnation of the indignant censor, but rather a hyperbole, exaggerating beyond permissible limits the nature and effect of the crime, and minimising the personality of the offender and the effect that punishment might have on the offender. The over-emphasis of the effect of the appellant's crimes, and the underestimation of the person of the appellant, constitutes, in my view, a misdirection.

This misdirection entitled the court to set aside the sentence imposed. The court outlined its duties in imposing a sentence of its own. There were three primary considerations:

1. the crime;
2. the offender; and
3. the interests of society.

This stipulation by the court, writes CR Snyman,

is of the utmost importance, since here the court set out tersely the three most important matters a court should take into consideration in imposing sentence. In this case the court had to weigh the accused's personal circumstances (and more particularly the fact that he was already relatively old and suffering ill-health) against the nature of the crime and the interests of society. The appellant's personal circumstances constitute mitigating circumstances, whereas the nature of the crime and the interests of society amount to aggravating circumstances.

At the request of Zinn's counsel, the court a quo had regarded all Zinn's crimes, for purposes of sentencing, as one course of conduct. Although the Appellate Division found that this concept was "really only valid in respect of the frauds," it took, with Rumpff's judgment, the same approach.

There "can be no doubt," the court held, that the large amounts involved, together with the persistent falsification of balance sheets and bills "for so long a period," as well as the incurring of vast debts knowing that the company was insolvent, "call for a very heavy sentence." The suggestion that the vigilant shipper should have realised that the company's borrowing was excessive, having regard to its turnover, "does not [...] carry much weight." As for Zinn's obligation to pay an ostensibly "crippling" interest rate, this "also carries very little weight, if any." Although the rate of interest had indeed been "high," Zinn had paid it "voluntarily, and persistently, and he knew that he had obtained by fraud the capital in respect of which he had to pay the interest."

Of considerably more weight was Zinn's age, which "undoubtedly requires consideration." The court determined that, "particularly if regard be had to his physical condition" (which was "certainly a matter which must be considered because it will make imprisonment considerably more disagreeable to him than to a healthy man of his age") an extended spell of incarceration would "probably not" offer him the chance to reform and begin life anew. His chances here were "necessarily greatly weakened." In arguing that "the purpose of punishment [...] should not be to destroy the offender completely," the court cited Johannes Voet, with his endorsement of Cicero's view that

anger should be especially kept down in punishing, because he who comes to punishment in wrath will never hold that middle course which lies between the too much and the too little. It is also true that it would be desirable that they who hold the office of Judges should be like the laws, which approach punishment not in a spirit of anger but in one of equity.

Voet was further cited as naming "among the faults of Judges which are most harmful [...] hastiness, the striving after severity and misplaced pity," and advocating that judges "be watchful to see that no step is taken either more harshly or more indulgently than is called for by the case." Finally, "in trivial cases indeed Judges ought to be more inclined to mildness, but in more serious cases to follow the severity of the laws with a certain moderation of generosity."

More germane to the facts of the present case, Rumpff was able to quote Voet thus: "With old persons in addition it seems fair that a corporal punishment ought to be mitigated." Other authorities were also cited who advocate leniency in some cases for the elderly.

As against all this, however, the court observed that in jail Zinn would be under constant medical supervision; furthermore, as the physician had conceded, there was a possibility that his release from his business problems might actually benefit his condition. In conclusion, wrote Rumpff,

the appellant must be put away for a long time, not only to protect society against a man who has no conscience in respect of people who lend him money or to whom he owes money, but also as punishment for crimes committed over an extended period and as a warning to businessmen who might feel inclined to abuse the confidence that must necessarily exist in a civilised state in the field of business and industry, particularly when substantial credit is required and when the credit is given on the strength of accounts that carry signed audit certificates.

If Zinn had been ten years younger and healthy, "I would have been of the opinion that the facts of the present case justified a sentence of 15 years' imprisonment." Given, however, his age and illness, "justice will be done if the sentence is 12 years' imprisonment." For the reasons stated, the sentence imposed by the Judge-President was thus set aside and, in substitution thereof, a sentence of twelve years' imprisonment imposed.

== See also ==
- Fraud
- Punishment
- Theft
- South African criminal law
