= 1975 in South Africa =

- Decades: 1950s; 1960s; 1970s; 1980s; 1990s
- See also: List of years in South Africa

The following lists events that happened during 1975 in South Africa.

== Incumbents ==
- State President:
  - Jim Fouché (until 8 April).
  - Jan de Klerk (acting from 9 to 18 April).
  - Nico Diederichs (from 19 April).
- Prime Minister: John Vorster.
- Chief Justice: Frans Lourens Herman Rumpff.

== Events ==
February

- 28 – The FNLA approaches the South African Embassy in London and requests 40 to 50 artillery pieces to assist their cause in the Angolan Civil War.

March

- 15 – Rhodesian Prime Minister Ian Smith and senior Ministers visit South Africa for talks.
- 19 – The Labour Party wins the second elections to the Coloured Persons' Representative Council.
- 21 – The Inkatha National Cultural Liberation Movement (Inkatha Yenkululeko Yezizwe) is founded by Zulu Chief Mangosuthu Buthelezi.
- 27 – The government announces that it will consolidate the 113 separate homeland areas into 36.

April

- 19 – Nico Diederichs becomes the 4th State President of South Africa.
- 30 – The World Meteorological Organization suspends South Africa from membership because of racial discrimination.

May

- 6 – The government announces that it will provide all Black children with free and compulsory education.

June

- 25 – The People's Republic of Mozambique becomes independent from Portugal.

July

- The Progressive Party merges with the Reform Party, a faction of the United Party, to form the Progressive Reform Party.

August

- 25 – The Victoria Falls Conference between Rhodesian Prime Minister Ian Smith and the United African National Council is held in a South African Railways coach on the Victoria Falls Bridge, officiated by Zambian President Kenneth Kaunda and South African Prime Minister John Vorster.
- The first Cuban forces arrive in Angola to join Russian personnel who are there to assist the MPLA who controls less than a quarter of Angolan territory.
- The United States and Zaire request South Africa to provide training and support for the FNLA and UNITA.

September

- 24 – Majors Kaas van der Wals and Holtzhausen, SADF liaison officers, are sent to Angola to assist UNITA.

October

- 14 – The SADF invades Angola during Operation Savannah in support of the FNLA and UNITA prior to the Angolan elections scheduled for 11 November.

November

- 11 – The People's Republic of Angola becomes independent from Portugal.
- 13–28 – In the Battle for Ebo, SADF and Angolan forces clash at Ebo in the Cuanza Sul province of Angola.
- 19 – The United States Congress approves the Clark Amendment, ending aid to the FNLA and UNITA.
- 25 – A South African Air Force Cessna 185 is shot down south of Ebo, killing pilot 2nd Lieutenant Keith Williamson, co-pilot 2nd Lieutenant Eric Thompson and South African Army battalion third-in-command Captain Danie Taljaard.
- 28 – South African Navy frigates evacuate 26 SADF members from behind enemy lines at Ambrizete, 160 kilometres (99 miles) north of Luanda in Angola.

Unknown date

- Lillian Ngoyi's ban, confining her to Orlando Township in Johannesburg and forbidding her to attend any gatherings, is renewed for five years.
- The South West African Police Counter-Insurgency Unit, commonly known as Operation K, is launched.
- Operation Polo, South Africa's covert military intervention in the Rhodesian Bush War, begins.

== Births ==
- 9 January – André Vos, rugby player
- 29 January – David Tlale, fashion designer and businessman.
- 2 February – Thinus Delport, rugby player
- 4 February – Sthandiwe Kgoroge, actress.
- 21 March – Corné Krige, rugby player.
- 27 March – Bruce Jacobs, field hockey player.
- 14 April – Raymond Seopa, professional footballer.
- 16 April – Selborne Boome, rugby player.
- 23 June – Sibusiso Zuma, soccer player
- 2 July – Stefan Terblanche, rugby player.
- 7 July – Louis Koen, rugby player
- 17 July – Robbie Fleck, rugby player & coach.
- 31 July – Andrew Hall, cricketer
- 7 August – Charlize Theron, actress.
- 1 September – Winnie Ntshaba, actress.
- 11 September – Pierre Issa, soccer player
- 16 October – Jacques Kallis, all-rounder cricketer.
- 24 November – Neil McKenzie, cricketer
- 13 December – Bubu Mazibuko, actress.
- 17 December – Tim Clark, golfer.

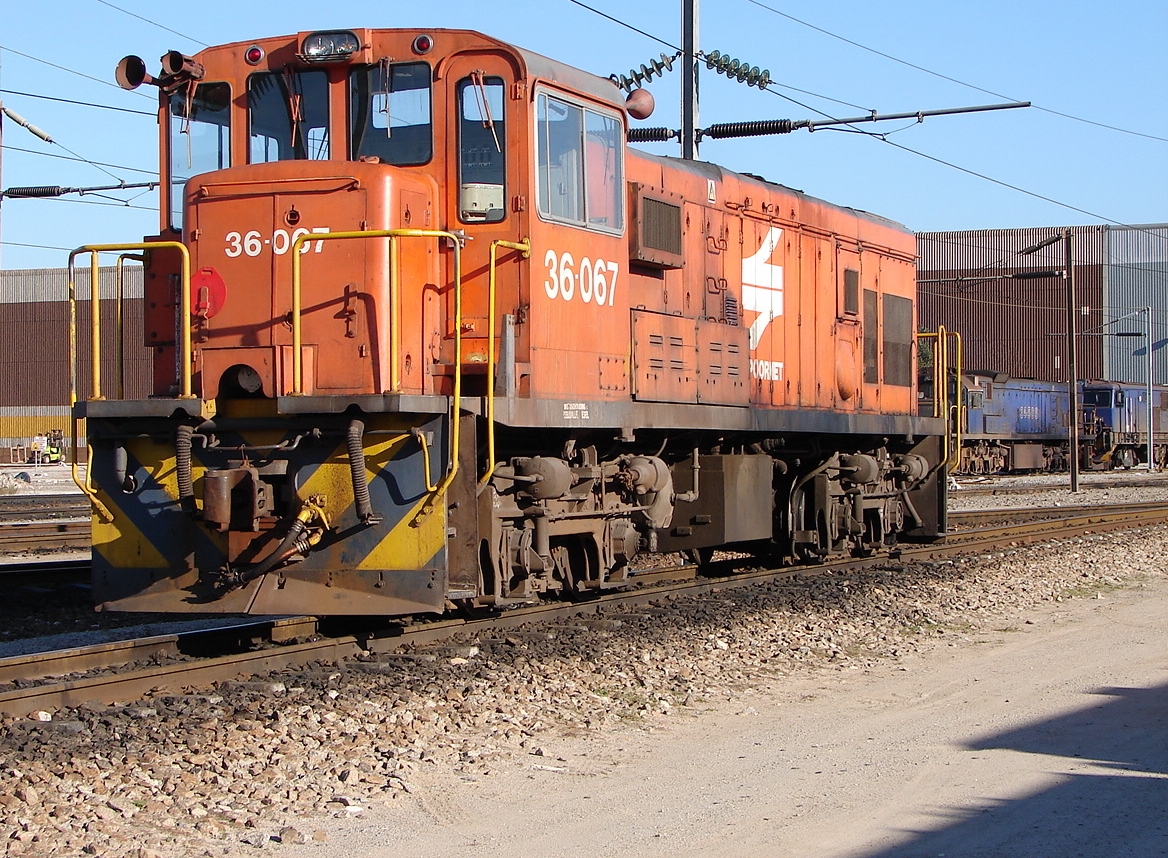
Class 36-000 (GE SG10B)

== Deaths ==
- 21 February – Pieter Voltelyn Graham van der Byl, politician (b. 1889)
- 8 May – Bram Fischer, former South African Communist Party leader. (b. 1908)

== Railways ==
=== Locomotives ===
- June – The South African Railways places the first of 124 Class 36-000 General Electric type SG10B diesel-electric locomotives in service.
