= 1965 in South Africa =

- Decades: 1940s; 1950s; 1960s; 1970s; 1980s
- See also: 1965 in South African sport; List of years in South Africa

The following lists events that happened during 1965 in South Africa.

== Incumbents ==
- State President: Charles Robberts Swart.
- Prime Minister: Hendrik Verwoerd.
- Chief Justice: Lucas Cornelius Steyn.

== Events ==
January

- 8 – Adam Faith, a British pop singer, cancels his tour of South Africa because the South African government prohibited mixed audiences at concerts.

April

- 1 – Frederick John Harris is hanged for exploding the bomb at Johannesburg Park Station that killed 77-year-old Ethel Rhys and injured 23 others on 24 July 1964.

May

- 4 – Units of the South African Defence Force begin to be issued with the R1 7.62 mm rifle, made in South Africa under license.

October

- 4 – At least 150 are killed when a commuter train derails at the outskirts of Durban.

November

- Rhodes University in Grahamstown installs a computer, the first university in South Africa to do so.

Unknown date

- The African National Congress establishes its headquarters in Morogoro, Tanzania.

== Births ==
- 1 February – Dave Callaghan, cricketer.
- 14 February – Themba Ndaba, actor.
- 17 March – Andrew Hudson, cricketer.
- 18 March – Yvonne Chaka Chaka, singer.
- 2 June – Thoko Didiza, politician.
- 10 June – Tiaan Strauss, rugby player.
- 13 July – Hannes Strydom, rugby player.
- 25 September – Augustine Makalakalane, football player.
- 1 December – Henry Honiball, rugby player.
- 18 December – John Moshoeu, footballer. (d. 2015).

== Deaths ==
- 1 April – Frederick John Harris, school teacher and bomb planter. (b. 1937)
- 1 July – Wally Hammond, English first-class cricketer and South African sports administrator. (b. 1903)
- 19 July – Ingrid Jonker, Afrikaans poet. (b. 1933)

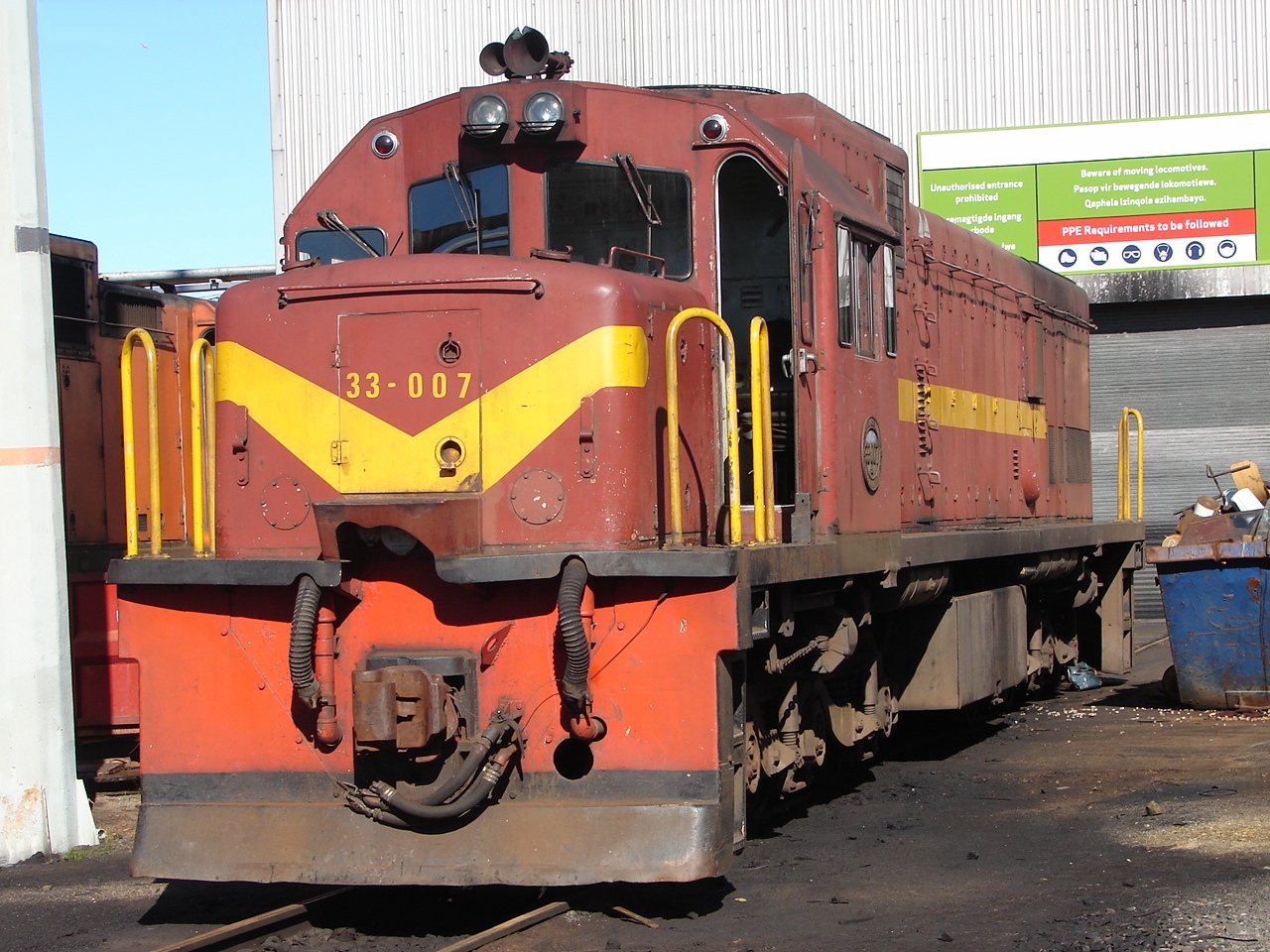
Class 33-000 (GE U20C)

== Railways ==
=== Locomotives ===
Two new Cape gauge locomotive types enter service on the South African Railways:

- The first of sixty-five Class 33-000 General Electric type U20C diesel-electric locomotives.
- The first of one hundred Class 5E1, Series 4 electric locomotives.
