= 1974 in South Africa =

- Decades: 1950s; 1960s; 1970s; 1980s; 1990s
- See also: List of years in South Africa

The following lists events that happened during 1974 in South Africa.

== Incumbents ==
- State President: Jim Fouché.
- Prime Minister: John Vorster.
- Chief Justice: Newton Ogilvie Thompson then Frans Lourens Herman Rumpff.

== Events ==
January

- 4 – Harry Schwarz and Chief Minister of KwaZulu Gatsha Buthelezi sign the Mahlabatini Declaration of Faith.
- 11 – David, Elizabeth, Emma, Grant, Jason and Nicolette Rosenkowitz are born in Cape Town, the first sextuplets in the world where all six babies survive.

March

- 18 – Members of the World Council of Churches's Executive or Central Committee are banned from South Africa.
- 19 – The Narcotics Bureau of the South African Police is established.
- 19 – Harry Schwarz and Chief Minister Cedric Phatudi of Lebowa sign the Seshego Declaration.

April

- 24 – A whites only general election takes place and is won by the National Party.
- 25 – A coup in Portugal leads to that country's withdrawal from its colonies in Angola and Mozambique.

May

- 29 – Prime Minister of South Africa John Vorster and Prime Minister of Rhodesia Ian Smith meet and agree to co-operative co-existence with and non-interference in the internal affairs of a black-ruled Mozambique.

June

- 5 – The Japanese government announces that South Africans will no longer be granted visas to enter Japan.

July

- 7 – New Zealand imposes a blanket ban on sports teams from South Africa.

September

- 22–23 – Prime Minister of South Africa John Vorster and President of Côte d'Ivoire Félix Houphouët-Boigny hold talks.

October

- 25 – Pik Botha declares at the United Nations that South Africa is beginning to make far-reaching reforms.

November

- 12 – The United Nations General Assembly suspends South Africa from participating in its work, due to international opposition to the policy of apartheid. South Africa was re-admitted to the UN in 1994 following its transition into a democracy.
- 26 – Anneline Kriel is crowned as Miss World 1974, the second South African to hold the title after Penny Coelen in 1958, when Helen Morgan resigns four days after winning the 24th Miss World pageant.

Unknown date

- The Sishen-Saldanha iron ore line is opened.

== Births ==
- 4 January – Sindi Dlathu, actress
- 2 February – André Snyman, rugby player
- 7 February – Steve Nash, South African-born Canadian basketball player
- 23 February – Herschelle Gibbs, cricketer
- 23 February – Robbi Kempson, rugby player
- 5 March – Megan Hall, triathlete
- 14 March – Mark Fish, soccer player
- 15 March – Percy Montgomery, Springbok rugby player
- 16 March – Brian Baloyi, soccer player
- 27 March – George Koumantarakis, football player
- 29 March – Basetsana Kumalo, first runner-up in Miss World 1994, businesswoman, tv personality
- 13 April – K. Sello Duiker, novelist (d. 2005)
- 21 April – Tony Kgoroge, actor
- 26 April – Louise Barnes, actress
- 11 June – Ricardo Loubscher, rugby player
- 21 June – Mandla Mandela, chief of the Mvezo Traditional Council and the grandson of Nelson Mandela
- 22 June – Alfred Phiri, soccer player
- 26 June – Cyril Nzama, soccer player
- 29 June – Judith Sephuma, singer
- 30 June – Hezekiél Sepeng, middle-distance athlete
- 11 July – Michelle Claire Edwards, badminton player
- 17 July – Linda Sibiya, radio, television personality and motivational speaker
- 26 September – Ninja (Die Antwoord), recording artist, rapper, record producer and actor
- 27 October – Thabo Mooki, soccer player
- 8 November – Penny Heyns, breast-stroke swimmer
- 17 December – Charl Langeveldt, cricketer

== Deaths ==
- 1 February – Abram Onkgopotse Tiro, militant student leader. (b. 1947)
- 2 February – Thomas Sturgess, an Indian cricketer, dies in Cape Town (b. 1898)
- 22 March – Peter Revson, American race car driver, died in pre-race crash at the South African Grand Prix in Midrand. (b. 1939)
- 3 April – Ossie Newton-Thompson, cricketer and politician. (b. 1920)
- 20 May – Leontine Sagan, director and actress. (b. 1889)
- 28 May – Matthew Frew, Air Vice Marshal of the South African Air Force, died in Pretoria. (b. 1895)

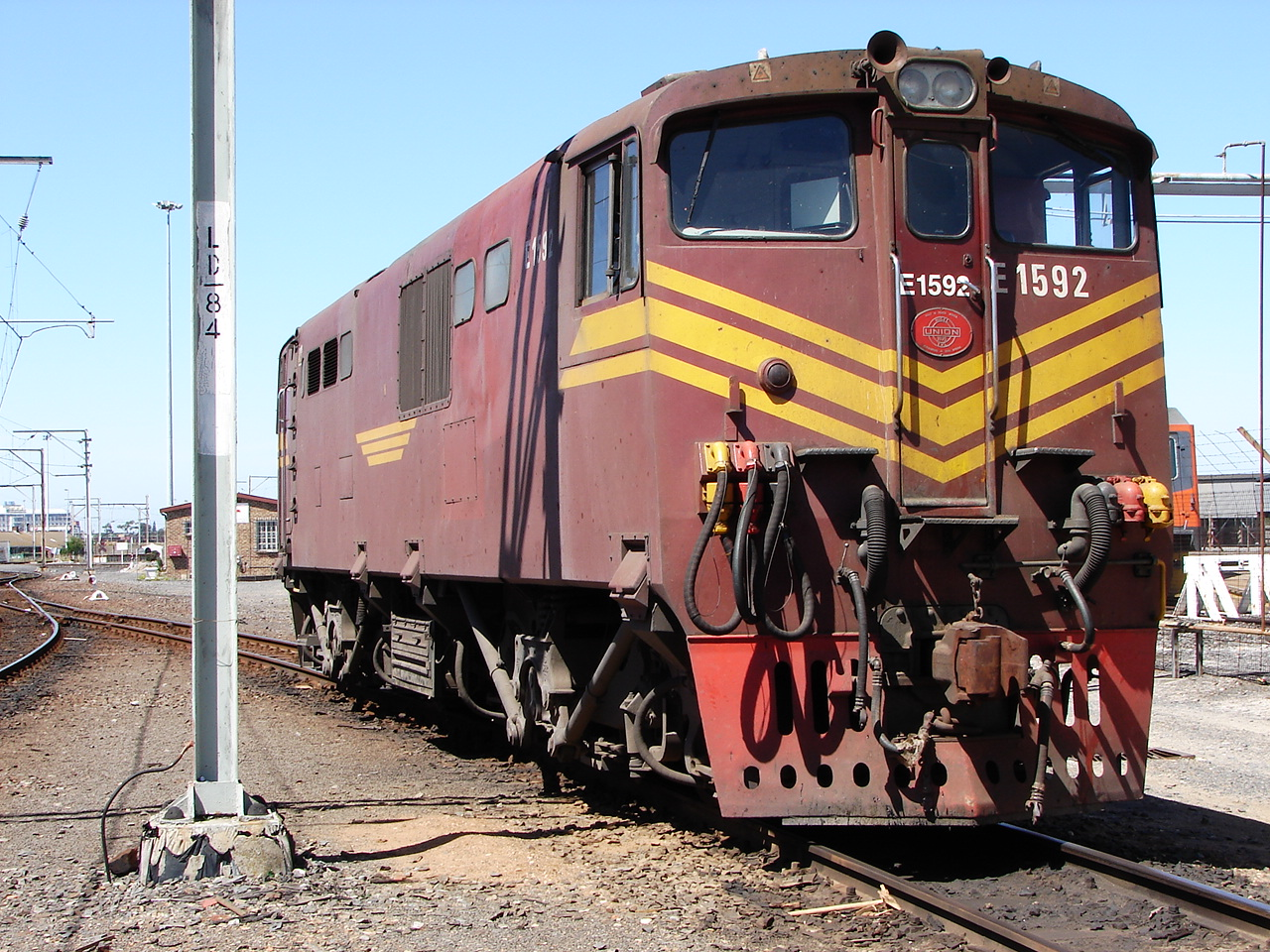
Class 6E1, Series 5

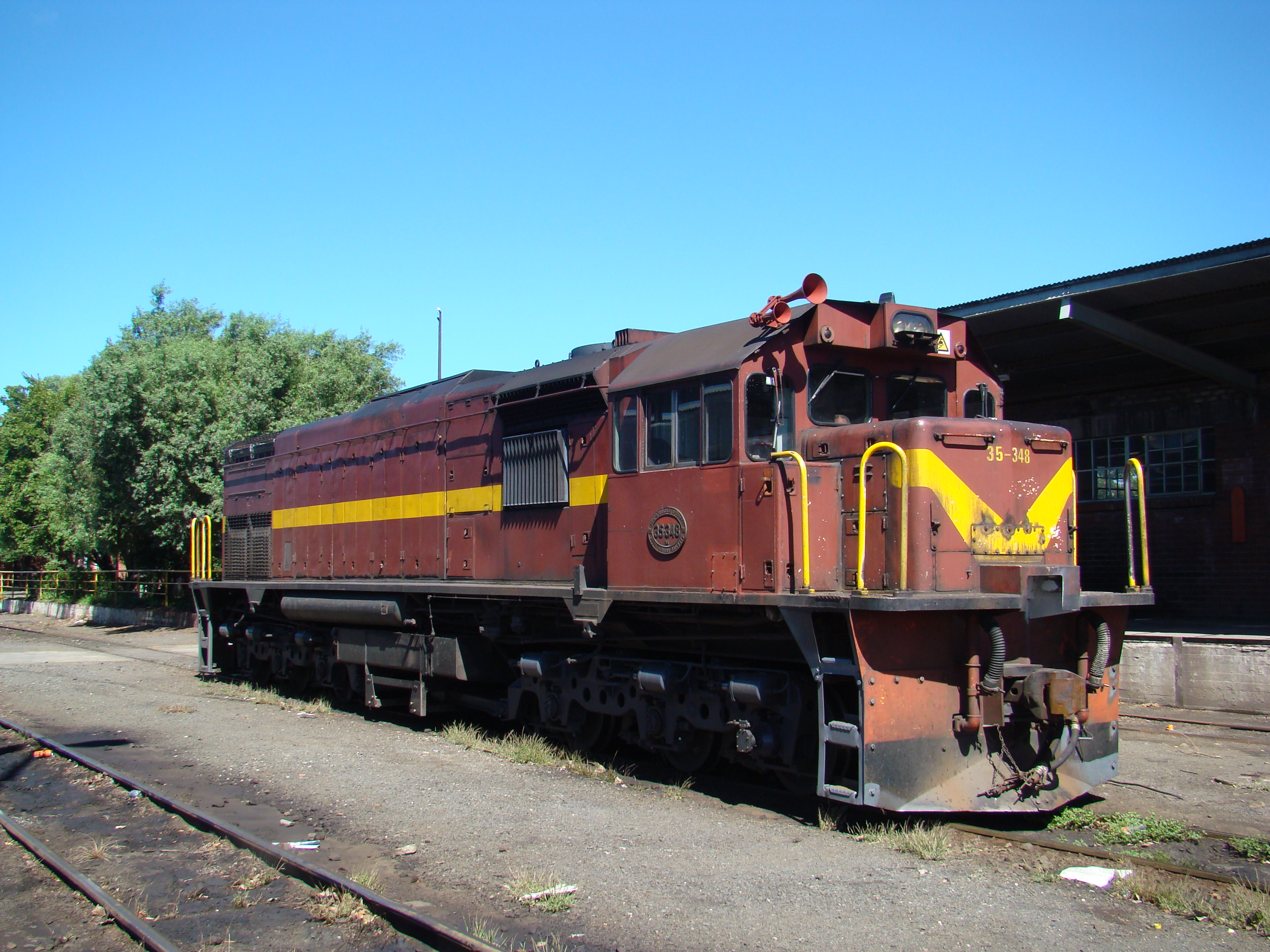
Class 35-200 (GM-EMD GT18MC)

== Railways ==
=== Locomotives ===
- Three new Cape gauge locomotive types enter service on the South African Railways:
  - The first of one hundred Class 6E1, Series 5 electric locomotives.
  - November – The first of 150 Class 35-200 General Motors Electro-Motive Division (GM-EMD) type GT18MC diesel-electric locomotives.
  - December – The first of 100 Class 34-600 GM-EMD type GT26MC diesel-electric locomotives.
- ISCOR places the first of forty-four Class 34-500 General Electric type U26C diesel-electric locomotives in service on the Sishen-Saldanha iron ore line.

== Sports ==
- 6 May – The British and Irish Lions begin a controversial twenty-two match rugby union tour of South Africa and Rhodesia.
