= 1970 in South Africa =

- Decades: 1950s; 1960s; 1970s; 1980s; 1990s
- See also: List of years in South Africa

The following lists events that happened during 1970 in South Africa.

== Incumbents ==
- State President: Jim Fouché.
- Prime Minister: John Vorster.
- Chief Justice: Lucas Cornelius Steyn.

== Events ==
May

- 21 – Prime Minister John Vorster and Prime Minister of Rhodesia Ian Smith hold private talks.

June

- 12 – Mangosuthu Buthelezi is elected first Chief Executive Officer of the black homeland of KwaZulu.

December

- 7 – The U.N. General Assembly supports the isolation of South Africa for its apartheid policies.

== Births ==
- 4 January – Marc Batchelor, soccer player (d. 2019)
- 7 January – Sizwe Motaung, soccer player (d. 2001)
- 30 January – Hans Vonk (footballer), soccer goalkeeper
- 30 March – Ruben Kruger, rugby player (d. 2010)
- 19 February – Kurt Darren, singer
- 2 March – Nicolene Neal, lawn bowler
- 30 March – Leleti Khumalo, actress
- 12 May – Steve Palframan, cricketer
- 22 May – Pollen Ndlanya soccer player
- 3 June – Johan Ackermann, rugby player & coach
- 10 June – Connie Ferguson, Botswana-born South African actress
- 20 June – Athol Williams (AE Ballakisten), poet and social philosopher
- 3 July – Deon Kayser, rugby player
- 30 July – Eric Tinkler, soccer player
- 8 August – Chester Williams, rugby player (d. 2019)
- 10 September – Phaswane Mpe, poet and novelist (d. 2004)
- 28 September – Vatiswa Ndara, actress
- 27 October – Tina Jaxa, actress
- 14 November – André Venter, rugby player
- 5 December – Sibusiso Vilane, adventurer, motivational speaker & author, first black African to summit Mount Everest

== Railways ==
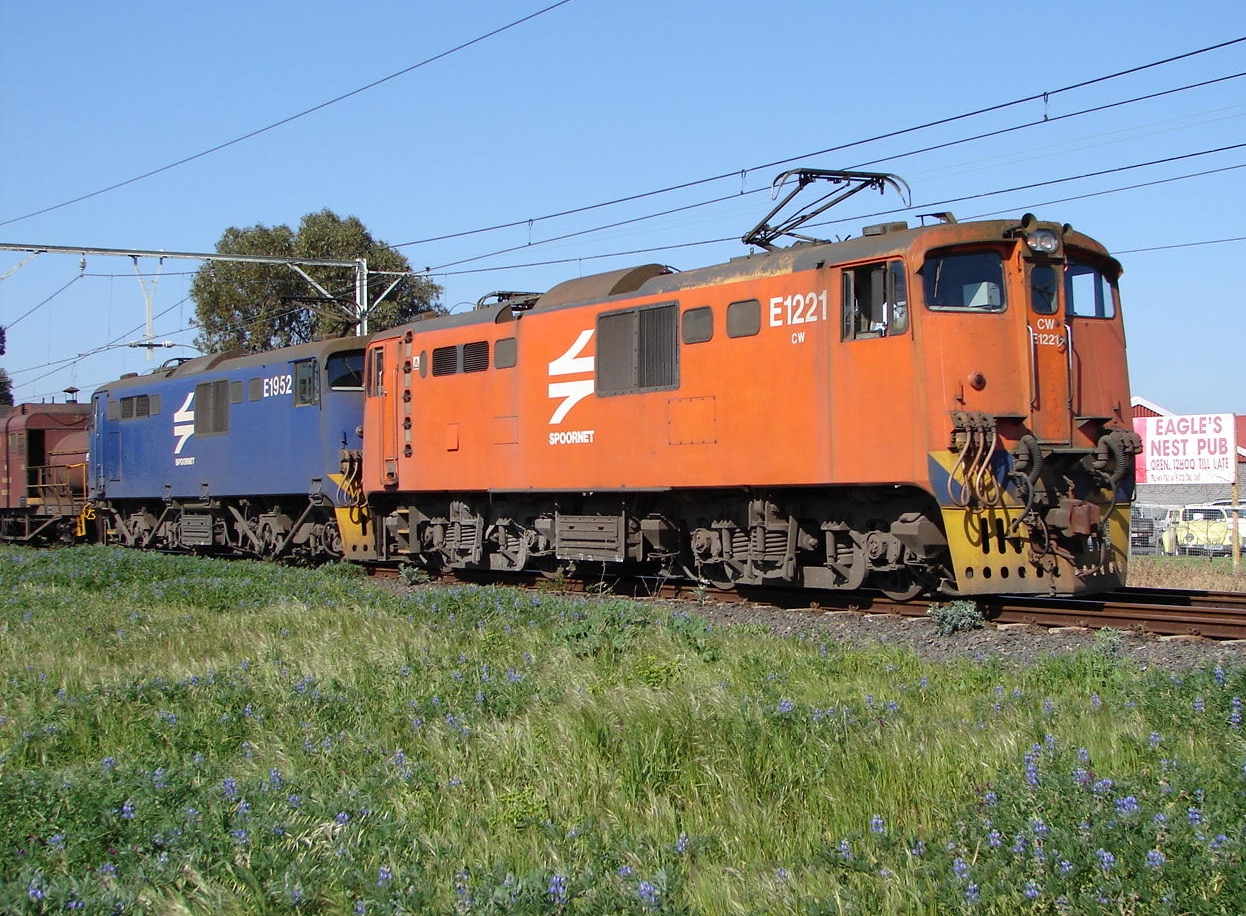
Class 6E

=== Locomotives ===
- The South African Railways places the first of eighty Class 6E mainline electric locomotives in service. Two are also built for Iscor for use at the Sishen iron ore mine.

== Sports ==
=== Rugby ===
- 10 January – The South African Springboks draw 8–8 with Ireland at Lansdowne Road, Dublin, Ireland.
