= 1966 in South Africa =

- Decades: 1940s; 1950s; 1960s; 1970s; 1980s
- See also: List of years in South Africa

The following lists events that happened during 1966 in South Africa.

== Incumbents ==
- State President: Charles Robberts Swart.
- Prime Minister:
  - Hendrik Verwoerd (until 6 September).
  - John Vorster (from 13 September).
- Chief Justice: Lucas Cornelius Steyn.

== Events ==
February

- 11 – District Six in Cape Town is declared a White Group Area by the government.

March

- 21 – To commemorate the Sharpeville massacre in 1960, this day is proclaimed "International Day for the Elimination of Racial Discrimination" by the United Nations General Assembly.

July

- 18 – The International Court of Justice rules in favour of South Africa in a case on the administration of South West Africa which was brought before them by Ethiopia and Liberia.

August

- 26 The first skirmish of the South African Air Force and the South African Police with the People's Liberation Army of Namibia, the armed wing of the South West Africa People's Organization, takes place at Ongulumbashe in Northern South West Africa during Operation Blue Wildebeest.

September

- 6 – Prime Minister Hendrik Verwoerd is assassinated in Parliament by Dimitri Tsafendas.
- 13 – John Vorster succeeds Hendrik Verwoerd as Prime Minister.

October

- 27 – The United Nations terminates the mandate given by the League of Nations and proclaims that South West Africa will be administrated by the United Nations. This is rejected by South Africa.

December

- 17 – South Africa refuses to join the trade embargo against Rhodesia.

Unknown date

- Mimi Coertse is awarded the Kammersängerin, a most prestigious title from the Austrian Government.

== Births ==
- 12 April – Vusi Kunene, actor.
- 26 May – Zola Budd, barefoot athlete.
- 9 July – Jamie Bartlett, actor.
- 29 July – Edward Motale, football player
- 9 August – João Silva, Portuguese-born photojournalist.
- 11 August – Mark Williams, football player & TV football analyst
- 10 October – Elana Meyer, athlete.
- 20 October – Allan Donald, cricketer
- 9 November – David Tsebe, marathon runner.
- 26 December – Gavin Lane, football player

== Deaths ==
- 6 September – Hendrik Verwoerd, Dutch-born politician and Prime Minister. (b. 1901)

== Railways ==
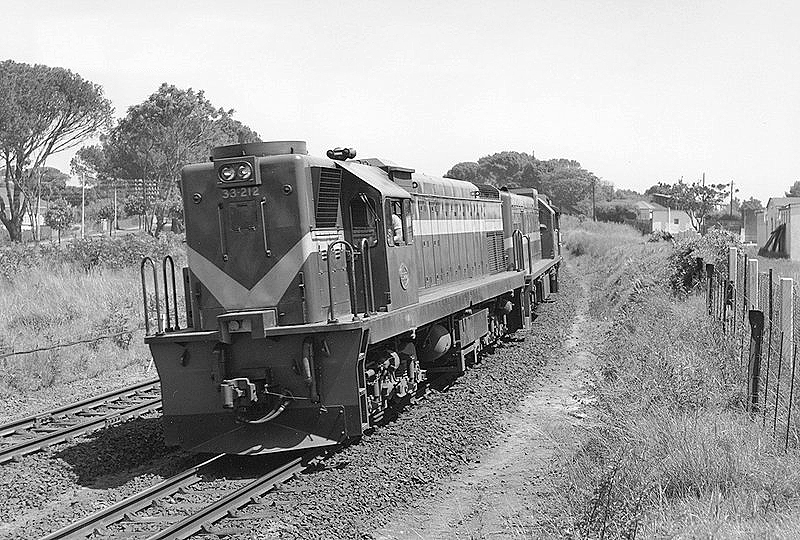
Class 33-200 (GM-EMD GL26MC)

=== Locomotives ===
Three new Cape gauge locomotive classes enter service on the South African Railways:

- June–July – Ten Class 32-200 General Electric type U20C1 diesel-electric locomotives in South West Africa.
- October – The first of twenty Class 33-200 General Motors Electro-Motive Division type GL26MC diesel-electric locomotives in East London. It is the first GM-EMD locomotive in SAR service.
- The first of 225 Class 5E1, Series 5 electric locomotives, the last series of Class 5E1.
