= 1972 in South Africa =

- Decades: 1950s; 1960s; 1970s; 1980s; 1990s
- See also: List of years in South Africa

The following lists events that happened during 1972 in South Africa.

== Incumbents ==
- State President: Jim Fouché.
- Prime Minister: John Vorster.
- Chief Justice: Newton Ogilvie Thompson.

== Events ==
May

- 3 – Abram Onkgopotse Tiro is expelled from the University of the North and students protest the expulsion.
- 4 – South Africa and Lesotho decide to establish reciprocal consular representation.

August

- 12 – Oil tankers Oswego-Guardian and Texanita collide near Stilbaai.

October

- 1 – 1 Reconnaissance Commando is established at Oudtshoorn.

Unknown date

- A South African Special Forces team carry out a submarine-borne raid on the Tanzanian port of Dar es Salaam using the SAS Emily Hobhouse, a Daphne class submarine.
- The South African Police deploys to South West Africa.
- Conscription for all white males is extended from 9 to 12 months, followed by a 19-day annual call-up for five years.
- Operation Plathond, a joint South African Defence Force and South African Bureau of State Security operation, is launched to train dissident Zambians in the Caprivi Strip, South West Africa.

== Births ==
- 2 February – Hendrick Ramaala, long-distance runner.
- 4 February – Sthandiwe Kgoroge, actress.
- 21 February – Mark Andrews (rugby player), rugby player.
- 12 March – Arno Carstens, singer-songwriter, lead singer of Springbok Nude Girls.
- 22 March – Baby Cele, actress.
- 26 March – Willem Jackson, football player
- 3 April – Alfred Ntombela, actor.
- 21 June – Irene van Dyk, South African and New Zealand netball player.
- 23 June – Slindile Nodangala, actress.
- 15 July – Sophie Ndaba, actress.
- 16 August – James Dalton (rugby player), rugby player.
- 25 August – Elmarie Gerryts, pole vaulter.
- 8 September – Os du Randt, Springboks rugby player.
- 16 October – Jacques Nienaber, Springboks coach.
- 28 October – David James, actor.
- 31 October – Shaun Bartlett, former soccer player & coach.
- 14 November – Florence Masebe, actress.
- 7 December – Sean Dundee, football player.
- 16 December – Kuli Roberts, journalist, TV presenter, author
- 23 December – Somizi Mhlongo, choreographer, actor and radio personality.
- 26 December – Colleen Piketh, lawn bowler

== Deaths ==
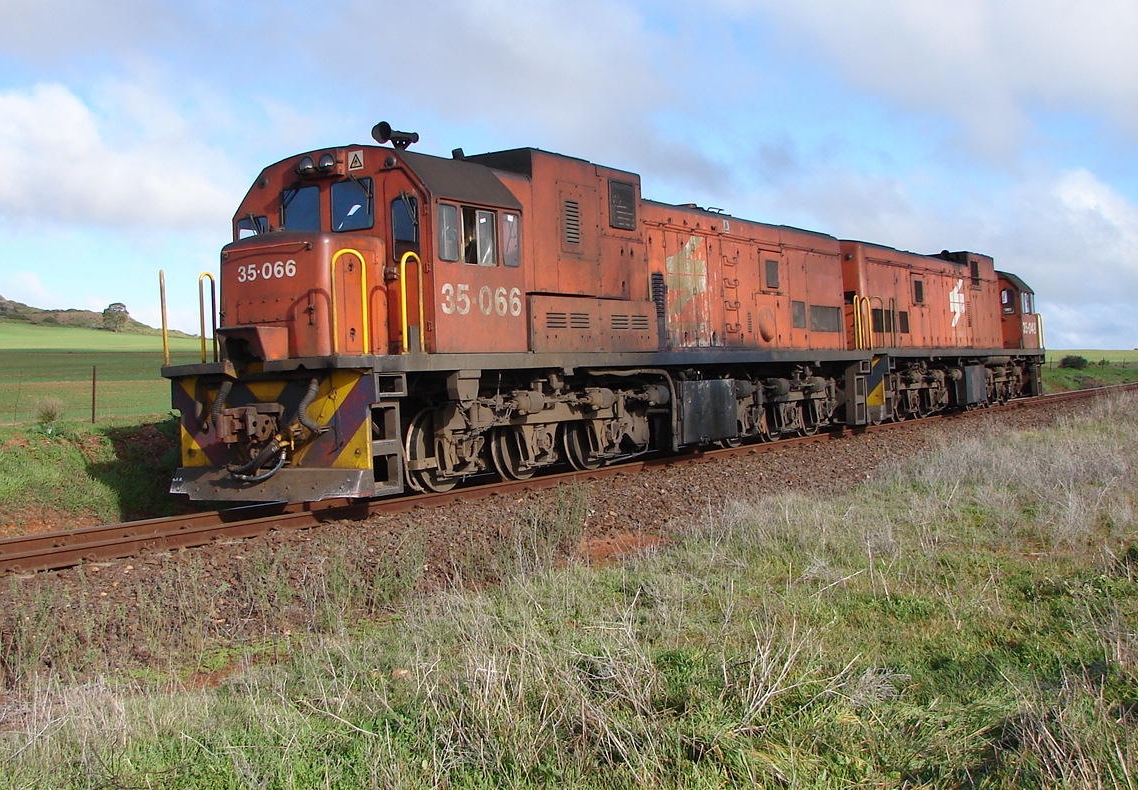
Class 35-000 (GE U15C)

- 14 May – Lawrence G. Green, journalist and author. (b. 1900)
- 11 August – Max Theiler, South African-American virologist and physician and Nobel Prize laureate. (b. 1899)
- 2 December – Sir Pierre van Ryneveld, head of the South African Air Force (b. 1891)

== Railways ==
=== Locomotives ===
- In March the South African Railways places the first of seventy Class 35-000 General Electric type U15C diesel-electric locomotives in branchline service.
