= SASL =

SASL may refer to:

== Computing ==
- Simple Authentication and Security Layer, a framework for authentication and data security in Internet protocols
- SASL (programming language), a non-strict functional programming language developed by David Turner in 1976
- System Application Support Libraries, an application of the Erlang programming language

== Other uses ==
- Saudi Sign Language, a sign language in Saudi Arabia
- South African Sign Language, a sign language in South Africa
- Solitaire Advanced Squad Leader, a single-player variant of the World War II board wargame Advanced Squad Leader
- South African Soccer League, a former association football league based in South Africa
