= Alfred McAlpine v Transvaal Provincial Administration =

South African legal case

Alfred McAlpine & Son (Pty) Ltd v Transvaal Provincial Administration is an important case in the South African law of contract, heard in the Appellate Division from 18 to 21 February 1974, and decided on 20 May. The case concerned a contract to build a portion of a national road, into which contract an exceptional number of variations was introduced. The result was disruption. Because the contract had not lapsed, the court determined that there was no new agreement in terms of which the contractor was entitled to reasonable remuneration instead of the contract price, and there was no implied term stipulating that the owner must introduce the variations "at reasonable times."

== Facts ==
Alfred McAlpine & Son was the plaintiff, and the Transvaal Provincial Administration (TPA) the defendant, in the court a quo. The parties had entered into a contract in terms whereof the plaintiff had undertaken to build a portion of a national road. Certain declaratory orders were applied for on the plaintiff's behalf.

During the execution of the contract, the contractor had received instructions to introduce an exceptionally large number of alterations which in certain cases had caused disruption. On McAlpine's behalf, it was alleged that, although each alteration had fallen within the scope of the contract, the cumulative effect of all the alterations was of such a nature that the original contract had lapsed and a new contract arisen impliedly through the conduct of the parties. In terms of this new contract, the plaintiff was entitled to reasonable remuneration for all the work it had done: that is, from the commencement of the execution of the contract.

== Tacit terms ==
As Corbett AJA notes in his judgment, "In legal parlance the expression 'implied term' is an ambiguous one in that it is often used, without discrimination, to denote two, possibly three, distinct concepts." Terms may be implied, in other words,

1. by operation of law (ex lege);
2. by custom or trade usage; and
3. from the facts surrounding the agreement of the parties (ex consensu).

The present case was concerned with whether or not that last concept should be invoked. Under South African law, a contract to do specified work for an agreed price may from its very beginning be so altered by the owner, and carried out as such by the contractor, that it may be said that for the original contract there was tacitly substituted a new agreement, in terms of which the contractor is entitled to reasonable remuneration for the work. Whether this has in fact occurred will depend on the facts.

Similarly, during the execution of a contract to do work for an agreed price, the contractor may receive, and also accept, instructions to do work which cannot really be regarded as part of the original contract. The contractor is entitled to reasonable remuneration for that work on the ground of a separate tacit agreement. This will also depend on the facts.

== Judgment ==
The court a quo had held that the variations had been envisaged in the original contract. In an appeal, the Appellate Division found that, as the plaintiff right up to the completion of the contract had still relied on the original contract, it could not possibly be said that the original contract in its entirety had been regarded by the parties as having lapsed and that a new contract had been entered into. There was, furthermore, a lack of evidence that what the plaintiff had built was not substantially the road which the contract envisaged.

As to an alternative claim for an order declaring that a certain implied term had to be assumed, in terms whereof the plaintiff was entitled to compensation for the disruption which had occurred because the engineer had not introduced his variations "at reasonable times," the court held that "at a reasonable time" was not the same as "within a reasonable time." Such claim, the court found (Jansen JA and Corbett AJA dissenting), had rightly been rejected by the court a quo.

The decision in the Transvaal Provincial Division, in Alfred McAlpine & Son (Pty.) Ltd. v Transvaal Provincial Administration, was thus confirmed. In the absence of a properly defined wording of an implied term which, notwithstanding the express provisions of the contract, had to be acknowledged, the court determined that it was not at that stage its duty to work out what wording such a term must have in order to satisfy the plaintiff as well as to comply with the stated requirements before the term could be acknowledged.
