= 1969 in South Africa =

- Decades: 1940s; 1950s; 1960s; 1970s; 1980s
- See also: List of years in South Africa

The following lists events that happened during 1969 in South Africa.

== Incumbents ==
- State President: Jim Fouché.
- Prime Minister: John Vorster.
- Chief Justice: Lucas Cornelius Steyn.

== Events ==
April

- 14-16 – A summit meeting of the leaders of East and Central African States in Lusaka results in the issue of the Lusaka Manifesto on 16 April.
- 17 – Dorothy Fisher is the first woman and the fifth person to receive a heart transplant under Dr. Christiaan Barnard.
- 25 to 1 May – The African National Congress holds its first national consultative conference in Morogoro, Tanzania. It becomes known as the "Morogoro Conference".

May

- 1 – The Department of Intelligence and Security of the African National Congress is established under Moses Mabhida.

June

- 4-10 – P.W. Botha, Minister of Defence, visits France accompanied by General R.C. Hiemstra, Chief of the Defence Force, Lieutenant-General W.P. Louw, Chief of the Army and Lieutenant-General J.P. Verster, Chief of the Air Force.

Unknown date

- Dorothy Nyembe is convicted of defeating the ends of justice by harbouring members of Umkhonto we Sizwe and is sentenced to 15 years imprisonment in Barberton Prison.
- South Africa's Atomic Energy Board creates a commission to evaluate the technical and economic aspects of peaceful nuclear explosives for use in mines.

== Births ==
- 3 February – Retief Goosen, golfer.
- 10 February – James Small, rugby player (d. 2019).
- 16 February – Mpho Moerane, businessman and politician (d. 2022)
- 5 March – Derek Crookes, cricketer.
- 22 March – David Nyathi, soccer player
- 12 April – Lucas Radebe, captain of the South Africa national football team.
- 2 June – Taha Karaan, scholar and jurist (d. 2021)
- 8 June – Jerry Sikhosana, soccer player
- 24 June – Thabo Mngomeni, soccer player
- 28 June
  - Linda Buthelezi, soccer player
  - Phil Masinga, soccer player. (d. 2019)
- 27 July – Jonty Rhodes, cricketer.
- 28 August – Nthati Moshesh, actress.
- 14 September – Chris Rossouw (rugby union, born 1969), rugby player
- 25 September – Hansie Cronje, all-rounder cricketer. (d. 2002)
- 17 October – Ernie Els, golfer.
- 18 October – Japie Mulder, rugby player.
- 20 October – Helman Mkhalele, soccer player
- 27 November – Alan Dawson (cricketer), cricketer
- 24 December – Sean Cameron Michael, actor and singer.
- 29 December – Brendan Venter, rugby player.

== Deaths ==
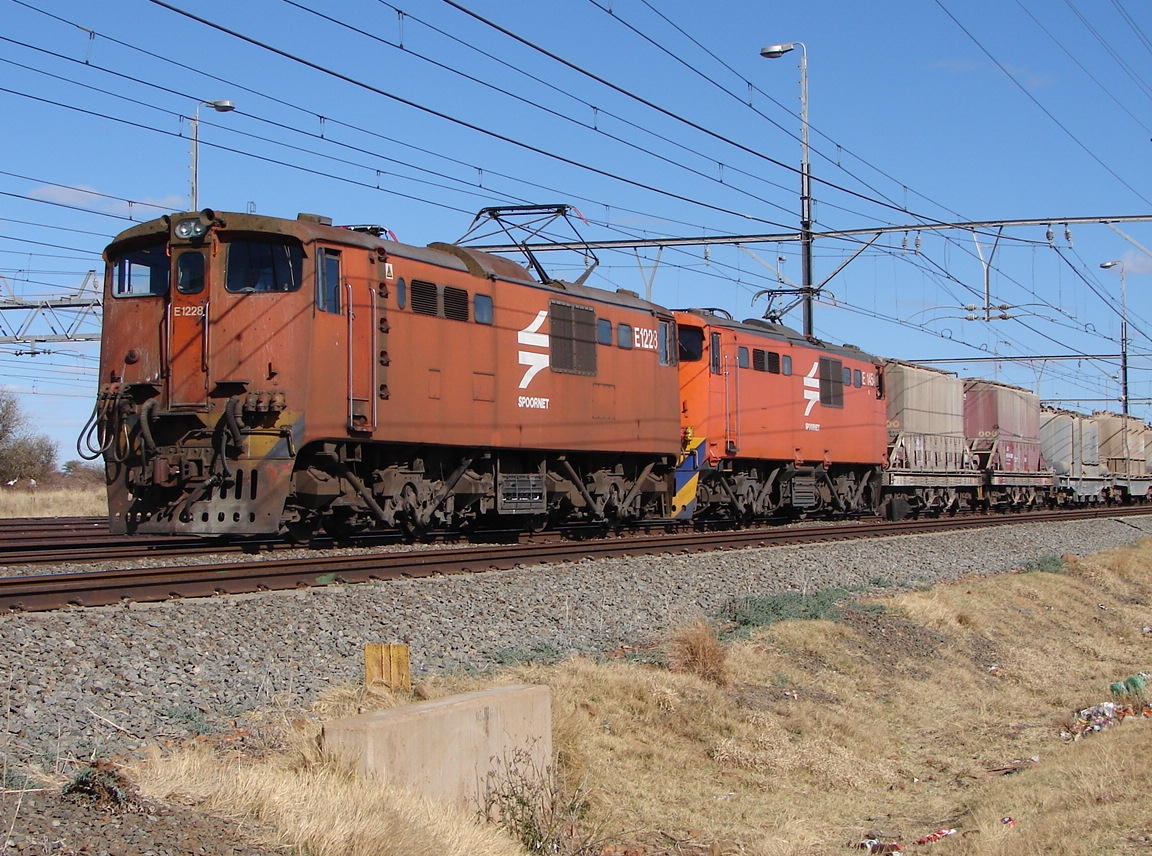
Class 6E1, Series 1

== Railways ==
=== Locomotives ===
- The South African Railways places the first of twenty Class 6E1, Series 1 electric locomotives in mainline service.
