= Pierre Rabie (judge) =

Chief Justice of South Africa (1917–1997)

The Honourable Pierre Rabie

15th Chief Justice of South Africa
- In office 1982–1989
- Preceded by: Frans Rumpff
- Succeeded by: Michael Corbett

Judge of the Appellate Division
- In office 1971–1982

Judge of the Transvaal Provincial Division of the Supreme Court of South Africa
- In office 1966–1971

Personal details
- Born: Pieter Jacobus Rabie; 30 January 1917 Orange Free State; Union of South Africa
- Died: 28 December 1997 (aged 80)
- Education: University of Stellenbosch; University of Michigan

Pieter Jacobus "Pierre" Rabie (1917–1997) was a senior South African judge during the apartheid era and served as Chief Justice from 1982 to 1989.

== Early life and education ==
Born in the Free State in 1917, Rabie matriculated at Koffiefontein in 1934. He then enrolled at the University of Stellenbosch where he obtained a BA degree, followed by a MA in Latin and a MA in Greek, all three degrees cum laude. After receiving a scholarship, he began his classical studies at the University of Michigan and was awarded the degree of Doctor of Philosophy in 1943. After returning to South Africa, he taught in classical languages at the University of Stellenbosch and also began studying law and obtained his LLB (cum laude) at the end of 1948.

== Career ==
Shortly after graduating, Rabie started practicing as an advocate at the Pretoria Bar and in 1962 he became a senior advocate. In 1966 he was appointed as a judge of the Transvaal Provincial Division of the Supreme Court. In 1970 he acted for the first time as a judge of the appellate division of the South African Supreme Court and 1971 he was permanently appointed to the Supreme Court of Appeal. In 1982 he was appointed as Chief Justice of South Africa.

== Personal life ==
In 1947, he married Annalie le Roux, with whom he had two daughters and a son. His son, also called Pierre, became a judge of the Gauteng High Court.

Legal offices
Preceded by Frans Lourens Herman Rumpff	Chief Justice of South Africa; 1982-1989	Succeeded by Michael Corbett
