= 1967 in South Africa =

- Decades: 1940s; 1950s; 1960s; 1970s; 1980s
- See also: List of years in South Africa

The following lists events that happened during 1967 in South Africa.

== Incumbents ==
- State President:
  - Charles Robberts Swart (until 31 May).
  - Tom Naudé (acting from 1 June).
- Prime Minister: John Vorster.
- Chief Justice: Lucas Cornelius Steyn.

== Events ==
January

- – The African National Congress and the Zimbabwe African People's Union form an alliance for armed struggle against South Africa and Rhodesia.

February

- 28 – Eben Dönges is elected second State President but suffers a stroke before he can take office.

June

- 1 – Tom Naudé becomes acting State President of South Africa.
- 12 – The Terrorism Act, 1967 is passed.

July

- 3 The first Krugerrand is minted to promote the nation's gold industry
- 14-15 Snow falls in the Transvaal. The Northern Transvaal records its first snowfall.
- The Liberation Committee of the Organisation of African Unity urges "freedom fighters" to invade South Africa and South West Africa.

August

- 4 – Military conscription becomes compulsory for all white men in South Africa over the age of 16.

September

- 8 – South African Police officially disclose that SAP counter-insurgency units are deployed in Rhodesia to counter Umkhonto we Sizwe.

December

- 3 – Professor Christiaan Barnard carries out the world's first heart transplant at Groote Schuur Hospital.

Unknown date

- The South African Police starts with counter-insurgency training.
- Umkhonto we Sizwe members conduct their first military actions in north-western Rhodesia in campaigns known as Wankie and Sepolilo.
- KGB double agent Yui Loginov is arrested in South Africa after the CIA betrayed him.

== Births ==
- 2 January – Francois Pienaar, rugby player
- 9 January – Dave Matthews, South African–born American musician
- 23 January – Nathi Mthethwa, national minister (d. 2025)
- 12 February – Nambitha Mpumlwana, actress
- 4 March – Daryll Cullinan, cricketer
- 15 May – John Tlale, football player
- June – Muhsin Hendricks, imam, Islamic scholar and LGBT activist (d. 2025)
- 10 June – Karen Roberts, field hockey player
- 26 June – Doctor Khumalo, football player
- 27 June – Andre Arendse, football player
- 10 July – Hennie le Roux, rugby player
- 16 July – Joel Stransky, rugby player
- 30 August – John Moeti, football player
- 6 October – Heyneke Meyer, Springboks coach
- 4 November – Rapulana Seiphemo, film and television actor
- 23 November
  - Oskido, recording artist, DJ, record producer and businessman. Co-founder of Kalawa Jazmee Records.
  - Gary Kirsten, cricketer & cricket coach
- 16 December – Claire Johnston, singer

== Deaths ==
- 20 May – Jan Gysbert Hugo Bosman (Bosman de Ravelli), concert pianist and composer.
- 2 July – Professor I.W. van der Merwe (Boerneef), writer and poet.
- 21 July – Albert Lutuli, teacher and president of the African National Congress). (b. c. 1898)
