= Henry Cele =

South African actor (1941-2007)

- Born: Henry Mbongeni Cele; 20 January 1941; Durban, South Africa
- Died: 2 November 2007 (aged 66); Durban, South Africa
- Occupations: Actor, footballer, football coach, manager

Henry Cele (Zulu pronunciation: [hɛnˈri ˈkǀɛːle]) (20 January 1941 – 2 December 2007) was a South African football player and actor. In the 1960s Cele became a goal keeper for the South African Soccer League and played the sport until 1978. In 1981, he was asked to audition for the role of the Zulu Warrior King Shaka kaSenzangakhona on stage for a production that played for a year. For the 1986 television miniseries Shaka Zulu, he reprised the role and gained significant fame worldwide.

Following this success, he appeared in roles in films and television. In 2001, he returned to the role of Shaka for the television movie Shaka Zulu: The Last Great Warrior 15 years after the original. In 2007, Cele died after spending two weeks in the hospital due to a chest infection.

== Early life ==
Cele was born in KwaMashu, Durban, South Africa. Within his family, he was referred to by his clan name Ndosi (Bavela KwaMthetwa), or Magaye.

Cele was raised by his grandmother. He left school at the age of 16, due to financial problems, and consequently turned to sports.

== Career ==
=== As an athlete ===
Cele, nicknamed "Black Cat" for his prowess as a goalkeeper, played for Aces United in the old South African Soccer League (SASL) in the 1960s. He also played for Lamontville Golden Arrows F.C. soccer team in Lamontville Township and coached a professional soccer club in South Africa until his death. On Saturdays, he played for Durity Football Club in the Commercial Football League in Durban.

In 1978, Cele felt he was he was too old to and retired from the sport, hence he started coaching and managing players.

=== As an actor ===
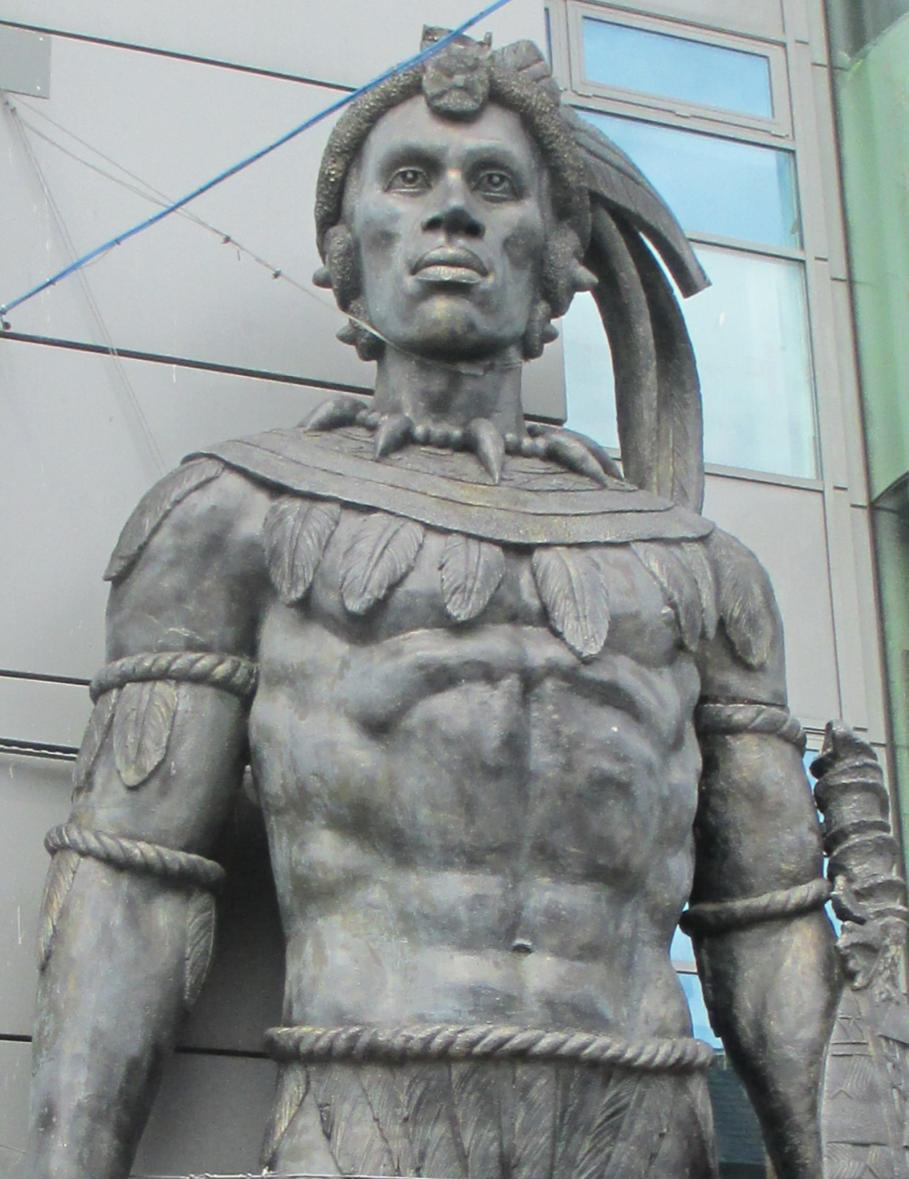
Statue of Shaka at Camden Market, obviously based facially on Cele's portrayal.

In November 1981, Cele was approached to audition to play the role Shaka, a Zulu King who led an army against the British empire in 1800s, in the stage production "Shaka" which ran for a year.

In 1986, the five episodes of the ten hours miniseries Shaka Zulu premiered. Director Bill Faure who saw him in the stage production suggested that he audition. Cele beat out 4000 individuals who also auditioned.

In 1988, Cele acted in David Winters's Rage to Kill, and Freedom Fighters.

In 1990, Cele acted in Curse III: Blood Sacrifice.

In 1996, Cele acted in Stephen Hopkins's The Ghost and the Darkness.

Cele appeared again in 2001 as Shaka in the 3-hour 2-part miniseries, called Shaka Zulu: The Citadel. Set in winter 1827. It was also released in a 2-hour telemovie version called Shaka Zulu: The Last Great Warrior.

== Later years and death ==
In later years, Cele moved from his suburban home in Glenmore, south of Durban, and returned to his hometown in KwaMashu township.

Cele died in Durban on 2 November 2007, after two weeks in hospital due to a chest infection. It was reported by News24, that in his final weeks he became aggressive with the other patients and staff of the St Augustine's Hospital. He is buried at the Stellawood Cemetery in Durban eThekwini Metropolitan Municipality, KwaZulu-Natal, South Africa.

== Personal life ==
Cele was married to Jenny Hollander. He had four children from a previous marriage.

== Filmography ==
- Shaka Zulu (1986--1989), Shaka - TV mini-series, episodes 1-10
- Blind Justice (1988), Kamisu
- Bush Shrink (1988), Katimbilo
- Freedom Fighters (1988), Jaunde
- The Last Samurai (1988), General Zohani
- Rage to Kill (1988), Wally Arn
- In the Name of Blood (1989), Pheto
- The Tangent Affair (1989), B.J. Rickson
- Curse III: Blood Sacrifice (1990), Mletch
- Deal of a Lifetime (1990), Mosoeu
- Ipi Tombi (1990), Duke
- Killer Instinct (1990), Samaani
- Point of Impact (1990), Titus
- The Rutanga Tapes (1990), Samaani
- Schweitzer (1990), Oganga
- Sweating Bullets (1990), Mosoeu
- The Ghost and the Darkness (1996), Mahina
- Shaka Zulu: The Last Great Warrior (2001), Shaka Zulu

== Awards ==
- Golden Plumes Award
