= Michael Corbett (judge) =

South African judge (1923–2007)

The Hon. Mr Justice Michael Corbett OMS LLD

16th Chief Justice of South Africa
- In office 1989–1996
- Preceded by: Pieter Jacobus Rabie
- Succeeded by: Ismail Mahomed

Personal details
- Born: 14 September 1923 Pretoria, Transvaal, Union of South Africa
- Died: 16 September 2007 (aged 84) Cape Town, Western Cape South Africa
- Spouse: Peggy
- Children: Peter; Andrew; Flick; Margie
- Education: Trinity Hall, Cambridge
- Occupation: Judge
- Religion: Anglican

Michael McGregor Corbett, OMS, LLB (14 September 1923 – 16 September 2007) was a former Chief Justice of South Africa (1989–1996). He served in World War II before going to Trinity Hall, Cambridge to read law in 1946.

== Early years ==
Michael Corbett was born in Pretoria. His father, Alan Frederick Corbett was born in Worcester, England in 1878. and served as the Commissioner for Inland Revenue. He completed his schooling at Rondebosch Boys' High School in Cape Town before serving in World War II in the South African Navy from 1941 until 1945, retiring with the rank of lieutenant commander. Prior to the war, he enrolled at the University of Cape Town and obtained a BA in 1941. After his active service during the war, he returned and obtained a LL.B., After graduating, he was awarded the Elsie Ballot Scholarship and gained entry to study law at Trinity College, Cambridge. He later obtained a first class LL.B.in 1948.

== Legal career ==
Corbett began his legal career when he read in the chambers of Marius Diemont for about six months before commencing practice. He made rapid progress, practising before Maritime/Admiralty Courts and Testamentary Courts, taking silk in 1963. In 1965, he was appointed as a Chamber Judge to the Bench of the Cape Provincial Division, hearing chamber matters and summary suits, and made Judge of Appeal in 1974, hearing mainly admiralty/maritime (including marine insurance and contract) and testamentary appeals. During this time, he made huge contribution to the South African legal system by co-authoring the standard textbook on the law of succession and the law of carriage by sea. He was appointed chief justice in 1989 and served with great distinction. In 1990, he delivered the 35th Annual Hoernlé Lecture at the Institute of Race Relations where he advocated for a supreme constitution and justiciable Bill of Rights. As Chief Justice of South Africa, he delivered the opening speech at the inaugural session of Codesa in December 1991 that began the negotiations for a new constitutional order for all South Africans.

== Retirement ==
Although reaching the statutory retirement age of 70 in 1993, his term of office was twice extended. He finally retired in June 1996. He was a chairman of the Rondebosch Boys Schools Education Trust.

== Tributes ==
On Corbett's retirement with a state banquet in 1996, then President of South Africa Nelson Mandela stated that:

His contribution is not easily encompassed. He has achieved distinction as legal scholar, as writer, as advocate and as a judicial officer. Throughout his career a passion for justice and a sensitivity to racial discrimination were combined with intellectual rigour and clarity of thought.

Five honorary degrees of Doctor of Laws (LLD) have been bestowed upon him:

1. University of Cape Town in 1982
2. University of the Orange Free State in 1990
3. Rhodes University in 1990
4. University of Pretoria in 1993
5. University of the Witwatersrand in 1994

== Family ==
Michael Corbett was the son of Alan Corbett and Sybil McGregor. His father had been an Inner Temple barrister, who for many years was Commissioner for Inland Revenue of the Union of South Africa. His mother was the daughter of Alexander John McGregor, a judge in the Union of South Africa, and Elizabeth Brand (daughter of Sir Johannes Brand, President of the Orange Free State). His son, Peter Corbett SC is a practising advocate at the Cape Bar.

Legal offices
Preceded by Pieter Jacobus Rabie	Chief Justice of South Africa; 1989–1996	Succeeded by Ismail Mahomed
