= South African Soccer League =

- Founded: 1962
- Folded: 1967
- Country: South Africa
- Most championships: Avalon Athletic F.C.(2 titles)

The South African Soccer League (SASL) was an association football league based in South Africa. It was formed in 1961 and folded in 1967. It was established by the South African Soccer Federation which represented the black African, Coloured and Indian population. In South Africa under apartheid, integrated sport was banned, so white South Africans played in the National Football League. The SASL folded due to a lack of playing grounds but in 1969, the SASF launched a new league, the Federation Professional League.

== Champions ==
Team	Titles	Years
Avalon Athletic F.C.	2	1962, 1963
Transvaal United F.C.	1	1961
Black Swallows F.C.	1	1964
Moroka Swallows F.C.	1	1965
Maritzburg City F.C.	1	1966
Verulam Suburbs F.C.	1	1967
