= Raymond Seopa =

South African soccer player

Personal information
- Date of birth: 14 April 1975 (age 51)
- Place of birth: Atteridgeville, South Africa
- Height: 1.84 m (6 ft 0 in)
- Position: Striker

Senior career*
Years	Team	Apps	(Gls)
1998–2003	Supersport United	85	(25)

International career
2000	South Africa	1	(0)
- * Club domestic league appearances and goals

Raymond Seopa (born 14 April 1975) is a South African former professional soccer player who played as a forward. He played for South African Premier Division club Supersport United.
