= Themba Mnguni =

South African soccer player

Personal information
- Full name: Themba Mnguni
- Date of birth: 16 December 1973 (age 52)
- Place of birth: Pretoria, South Africa
- Height: 1.78 m (5 ft 10 in)
- Position: Defender

Senior career*
Years	Team	Apps	(Gls)
1995–2000	Mamelodi Sundowns	187	(12)
2000–2005	Supersport United	86	(7)
2005–2006	Orlando Pirates	0	(0)
2006–2007	AmaZulu F.C.	7	(0)

International career
1998–2003	South Africa	14	(0)
- * Club domestic league appearances and goals

Themba Mnguni (born 16 December 1973) is a South African former soccer player who played mostly for Mamelodi Sundowns and Supersport United.

He played for South Africa national soccer team and was in part of the squad that travelled to France for the 1998 FIFA World Cup.
