= South African Class 5E1, Series 4 =

Type of electric locomotive

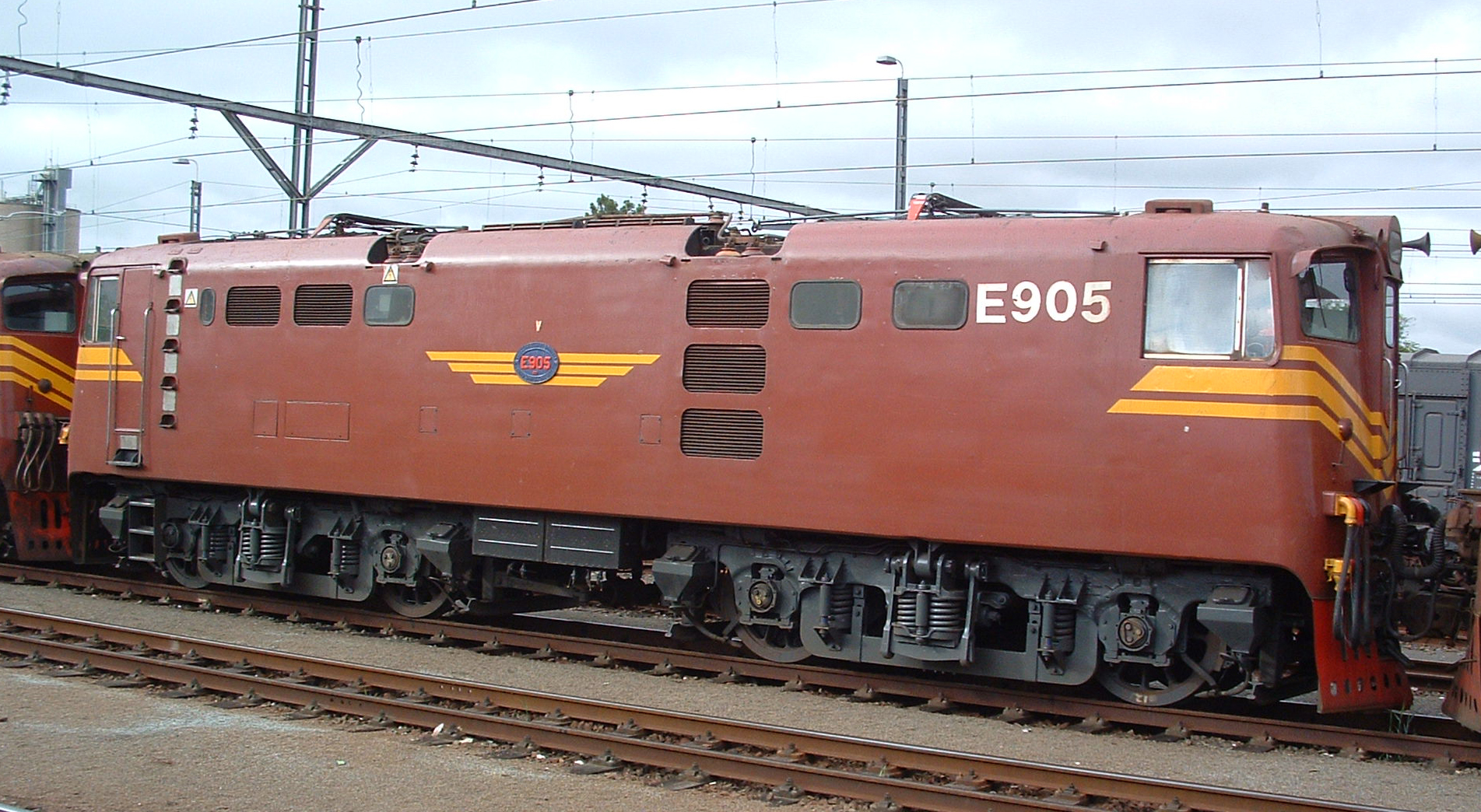
- No. E905 at Harrismith, Free State, 6 November 2003
Type and origin
- Power type: Electric
- Designer: Metropolitan-Vickers
- Builder: Union Carriage & Wagon
- Model: MV 5E1
- Build date: 1965
- Total produced: 100
Specifications
- Configuration
  - AAR: B-B
  - UIC: Bo'Bo'
  - Commonwealth: Bo-Bo
- Gauge: 3 ft 6 in (1,067 mm) Cape gauge
- Wheel diameter: 1,220 mm (48.03 in)
- Wheelbase: 11,279 mm (37 ft 1/16 in)
  - Bogie: 3,430 mm (11 ft 3 1/16 in)
- Pivot centres: 7,849 mm (25 ft 9 in)
- Panto shoes: 6,972 mm (22 ft 10 1/2 in)
- Length
  - Over couplers: 15,494 mm (50 ft 10 in)
  - Over beams: 14,631 mm (48 ft 0 in)
- Width: 2,896 mm (9 ft 6 in)
- Height
  - Pantograph: 4,089 mm (13 ft 5 in)
  - Body height: 3,937 mm (12 ft 11 in)
- Axle load: 21,591 kg (47,600 lb)
- Adhesive weight: 86,364 kg (190,400 lb)
- Loco weight: 86,364 kg (190,400 lb)
- Electric system/s: 3 kV DC catenary
- Current pickup(s): Pantographs
- Traction motors: Four AEI-281AX
  - Rating 1 hour: 485 kW (650 hp)
  - Continuous: 364 kW (488 hp)
- Gear ratio: 18:67
- Loco brake: Air & Regenerative
- Train brakes: Vacuum
- Couplers: AAR knuckle
Performance figures
- Maximum speed: 97 km/h (60 mph)
- Power output
  - 1 hour: 1,940 kW (2,600 hp)
  - Continuous: 1,456 kW (1,953 hp)
- Tractive effort
  - Starting: 250 kN (56,000 lbf)
  - 1 hour: 184 kN (41,000 lbf)
  - Continuous: 122 kN (27,000 lbf) @ 40 km/h (25 mph)
Career
- Operators: South African Railways; Spoornet
- Class: Class 5E1
- Number in class: 100
- Numbers: E821-E920
- Delivered: 1965–1966
- First run: 1965

The South African Railways Class 5E1, Series 4 of 1965 was an electric locomotive.

In 1965 and 1966 the South African Railways placed one hundred Class 5E1, Series 4 electric locomotives with a Bo-Bo wheel arrangement in mainline service.

== Manufacturer ==
Series 4 of the Metropolitan-Vickers (Metrovick)-designed 3 kV DC Class 5E1 electric locomotive was built for the South African Railways (SAR) in 1965 by Union Carriage and Wagon (UCW) in Nigel, Transvaal, with the electrical equipment being supplied by Associated Electrical Industries (AEI).

The one hundred Series 4 units were delivered in 1965 and 1966, numbered in the range from E821 to E920. The Series 4 were equipped with four AEI 281 AX axle-hung traction motors fitted with tapered roller bearings. UCW did not allocate builder's numbers to the locomotives it built for the SAR and used the SAR unit numbers for their record keeping.

== Identifying features ==
The unit had two cut-outs on the roofline on the roof access ladder side, but an unbroken roofline on the opposite side. The Series 3, 4 and 5 units could be visually distinguished from earlier series by their three small square access panels on the lower sides above the battery box instead of the two larger rectangular access panels on the Series 1 and 2 units. Series 4 and 5 units could be distinguished from all earlier series by their one small square and one larger rectangular access panels on the lower sides above the second axle from the left instead of the sole rectangular panel on earlier series.

== Headlamps ==
In the 1970s most serving SAR steam and electric locomotives had their original large round headlamps replaced by less attractive but more efficient double sealed-beam automobile headlamps. On Series 3, 4 and early series 5 units, the original round headlamp housing was retained and the glass was replaced by a metal disk containing the sealed beam headlamps.

== Body shape ==
From the introduction of the Class 5E, Series 1 in 1955, the body shape of the locomotive remained virtually unchanged apart from the roofline on the roof access ladder side, where the Class 5E had a single cut-out in line with the vertical row of three grilles on the body side while the Class 5E1 had an additional cut-out in line with the small window to the right of the two grilles aft of the roof access ladder. All these units had round headlamps and rounded corners on their cab ends. This body shape was to change to smaller round headlamps and squared corners part-way through the construction of the Class 5E1, Series 5.

Series 4 units, such as no. E869, have been photographed with a squared cornered no. 1 end. After introduction of the squared cornered ends on Series 5, the practice was that when units of lower series were involved in collisions and the ends needed rebuilding, this was to be done to the latest design, even though the other end of the unit would possibly differ if it had not been damaged.

== Service ==
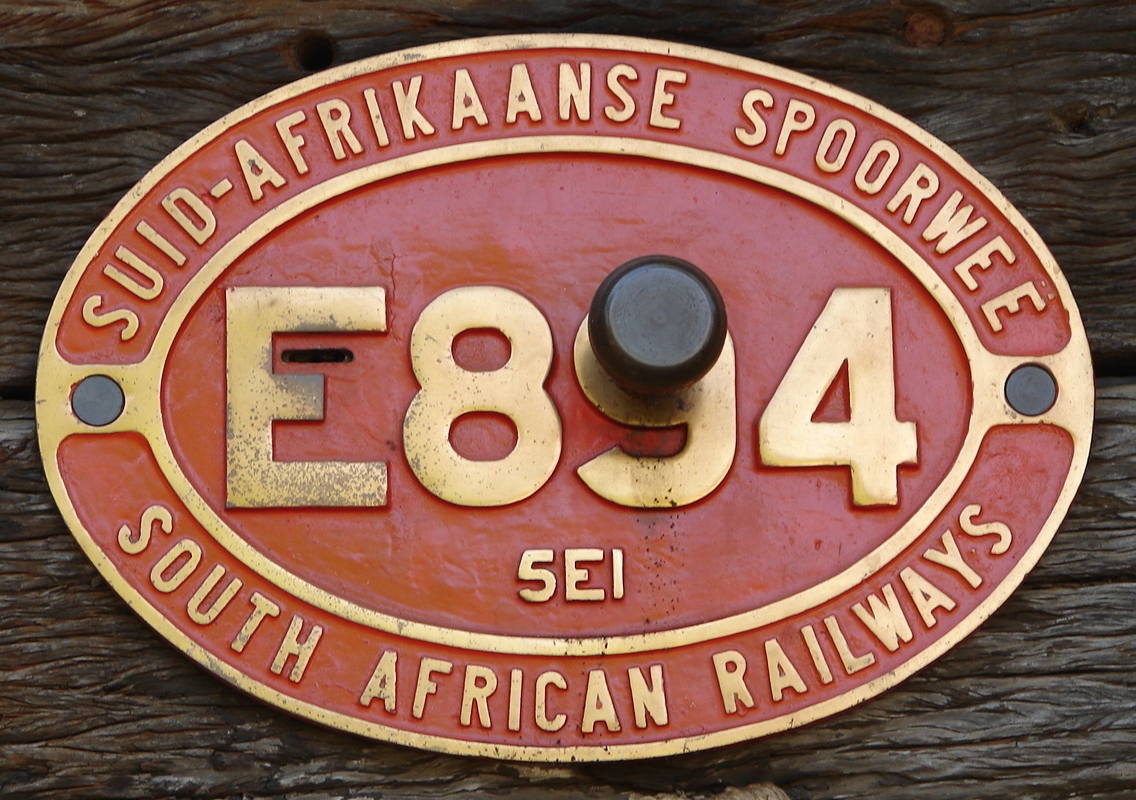
Builder's plate

The Class 5E1 family served in goods and passenger working on all 3 kV DC electrified mainlines country-wide for about forty years. They worked the vacuum-braked goods and mainline passenger trains over the lines radiating south, west and north of Durban almost exclusively until the mid-1970s and Class 6E1s only became regular motive power in Natal when air-braked car trains began running between Durban and the Reef. By the turn of the millennium, most of the Series 4 locomotives had been withdrawn and scrapped.

One of the two number plates off no. E894 now serves as a backing plate to a doorknob at a staff club facility which was built from two Class 5E1 shells at Sentrarand Depot in Gauteng.

== Livery ==
The whole series was delivered in the Gulf Red livery with signal red cowcatchers, yellow whiskers, full body-length side-stripes and with the number plates on the sides enclosed in three-stripe wings. In the 1970s the side-stripes were curtailed to just beyond the cab-sides, but with the number plates on the sides still enclosed in three-stripe wings. Most, if not all, ended their service lives in that livery.

== Illustration ==
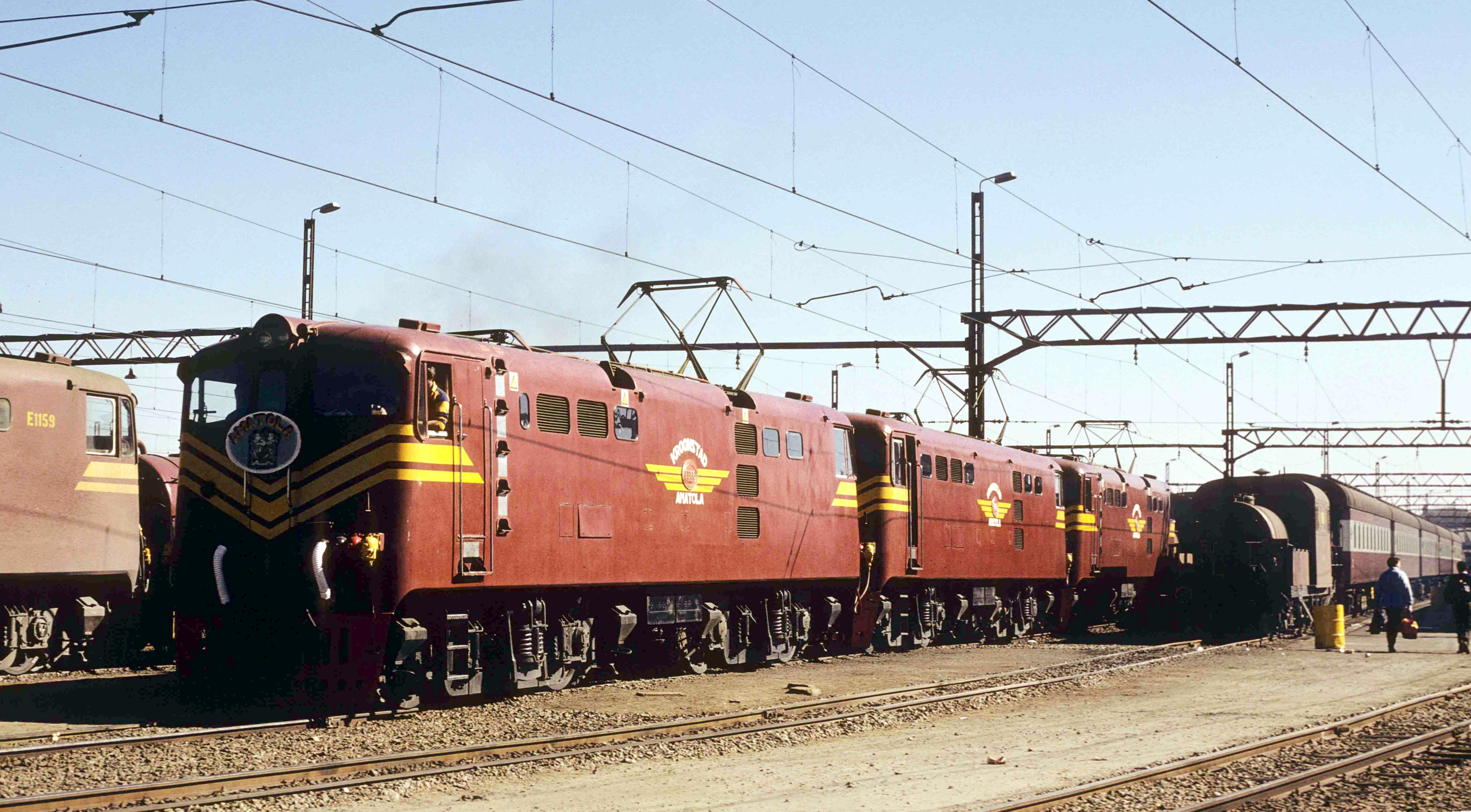
No. E866, with E867 and E868, at Braamfontein, 10 July 1990

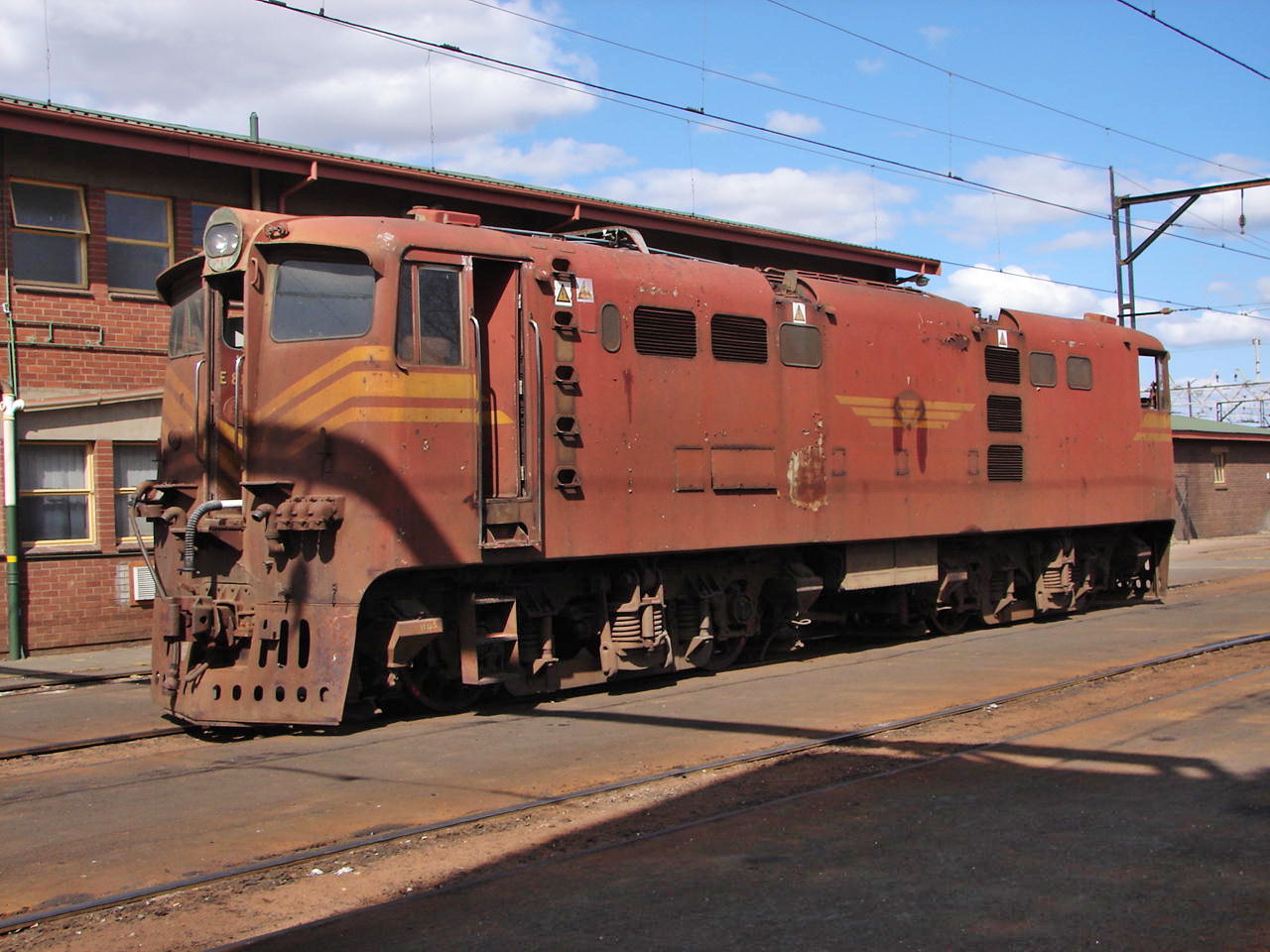
No. E888 at Ladysmith, Natal, 5 August 2007
