= Jonathan Solomons =

South African soccer player

Personal information
- Full name: Jonathan Solomons
- Date of birth: 16 January 1976 (age 50)
- Place of birth: Cape Town, South Africa
- Position: Winger

Team information
- Current team: Milano United

Senior career*
Years	Team	Apps	(Gls)
2006–2007	Bloemfontein Celtic	3	(0)
- * Club domestic league appearances and goals as of 13 February 2007 ‡ National team caps and goals as of 13 February 2007

Jonathan Solomons (born 16 January 1976 in Cape Town) is a South African football (soccer) winger for the Vodacom League club Milano United. He made his professional debut in 1994 at Hellenic.

Solomons spent the 2006–07 season struggling with injury at Bloemfontein Celtic and started in only three cup games while there.
