= Paseka Motsoeneng =

South African televangelist and Prophet (born 1968)

Prophet Paseka Frans Motsoeneng
- Born: Paseka Frans Motsoeneng; April 8, 1968 (age 58); South Africa
- Occupations: Prophet, minister, televangelist
- Spouse: Mokgadi Motsoeneng
- Children: 2 sons

Paseka Franz Motsoeneng (born April 8, 1968), more popularly known as Prophet PFP Motsoeneng or Prophet Mboro, is a South African televangelist and self proclaimed leader of Incredible Happenings Ministries with its main church based in Katlegong, East Rand of Johannesburg, South Africa.

On March 3, 2014, Paseka Motsoeneng was the subject of a BBC documentary by Reggie Yates called The Millionaire Preacher: Reggie Yates' Extreme South Africa.

== Controversies ==
In 2011, the pastor was accused of sexual assault after inserting his hands into two of his congregant's vaginas, supposedly to expel demons.

After Motsoeneng had apparently restored a couple's libido, the couple had sexual intercourse in front of the pastor and a TV crew. Their act was not shown on television, and Mboro organised a mass protest to be staged outside the TV studios to force them to flight the episode.

In 2021, ABSA bank threatened to auction his house due to non-payment of loans. Motsoeneng claimed that ABSA Bank had been fraudulently stealing money from his account amounting to over R3 million. Motsoeneng had recently purchased a BMW i8, said to be valued at R1,2 million.

Motsoeneng was arrested in August 2024 Paseka and charged with kidnapping and possession of dangerous weapons after, along with an armed entourage, forcibly entered a school and attempted to take his son's children away from their maternal grandmother.

Motsoeneng was released on bail of R3000, while his bodyguard was freed only on a warning.
