= Johan Thom =

South African artist

- Born: January 1976 (age 50)
- Known for: Visual art

Johan Thom (born 1976, South Africa), is a visual artist who works across video, installation, performance and sculpture. He has been described as one of South Africa's foremost performance artists.

== Exhibitions ==
Thom's work has been exhibited in group exhibitions at the Venice Biennial in 2003 and 2005; the International Film Festival Rotterdam, The Netherlands, in 2006; the 1st Architecture, Landscape and Art Biennial of the Canary Islands 2006, curated by Antonio Zaya (1954–2007), Spain, and the 40th Belgrade International Theatre Festival in 2006. Other exhibitions include: Britto New Media Festival at the National Gallery in Dhaka, Bangladesh, 2009; .ZA: Giovane arte dul Sudafrica at the Pallazo delle Papesse, Sienna, Italy curated by Lorenzo Fusi, Kendell Geers Minette Vari, Sue Williamson, Berni Searle and Marlene Dumas in 2008; South African Art on Paper at Gallery Barry Keldoulis in Sydney, Australia, 2007; The 10th International Computer Arts Festival, Maribor, Slovenia, 2004 and 'X- an Exhibition in Celebration of Ten Years of Democracy in South Africa', curated by Kelly O`Reilly at the Stephen Lawrence Gallery, Greenwich, London, 2004. His work was exhibited in 2009–2010 as part of the travelling group exhibition 'Dystopia', first at the UNISA Art Gallery, Pretoria, South Africa (8 October – 15 November 2009). The exhibition then travelled to Museum Africa, Johannesburg, South Africa (8 October – 15 November 2009) and the Oliewenhuis Art Museum; Bloemfontein, South Africa (10 June – 8 August 2010). Other travelling group exhibitions include: 'Mine', a selection of films by South African artists, including William Kentridge, Minette Vari, Berni Searle, Robin Rhode, Simon Gush, Bridget Baker and others) curated by Abrie Fourie travelling to Iwalewa-Haus, Bayreuth, Germany (10 February – 6 March 2010) and Ductac Gallery, Dubai (18 January – 6 February 2012) and the Johannesburg Art Gallery, (7 – 28 March 2012).

== Online reviews/ listings ==
- From here to there: ‘.za Giovane arte dul Sudafrica at the Pallazo delle Papesse, Sienna Italy. (Also published in Art South Africa. Vol 6, Issue 4, Winter. Bell Roberts Publishing: Cape Town)
- Johan Thom: Bag Factory Artists Studios, 1 – 30 November 2007.
- Johan Thom: Becoming, binding & disappearing, Arthtrob International Listings, 22 April – 5 September 2010, Iwalewa-Haus, Bayreuth, Germany.

== Conferences / Seminars ==
Thom has presented talks and workshops at numerous conferences and institutions, including at the University College London; UK; the Finnish Academy of Fine Art, Helsinki, 28 – 29 April 2010; Graduate School of the University of Dublin, UK; University of Cambridge, UK; University of Belgrade; The Venice Biennial, Italy.

In South Africa he has lectured and presented talks and workshops at Tshwane University of Technology, Tshwane; the University of Pretoria, Tshwane; Rhodes University, Grahamstown; Technikon Witwatersrand, Johannesburg; the Bag Factory (Fordsburg Artists' Studios), Johannesburg; Wits School of Fine Arts, Johannesburg and Wits University, Johannesburg.

== Authored ==
Thom has written art reviews and articles for a variety of publications including for Art South Africa Magazine, a review of artist Kendell Geers' exhibition at the Steven Friedman Gallery, London; a catalogue essay of artist Diane Victor's 'Disasters of Peace Series' held by Map – South Africa Modern Art Projects, South Africa, 2008; an article for Die Beeld, (South African Newspaper), about the photographs of artist Santu Mofokeng.

== See also ==
- Performance art
- Installation art
- Video art
- Sculpture
