= Andrew Tucker (soccer) =

South African soccer player

Personal information
- Date of birth: 25 December 1968 (age 57)
- Place of birth: South Africa
- Position: Defender

Senior career*
Years	Team	Apps	(Gls)
1991–1993	Hellenic	?	(?)
1994–1999	SuperSport United	?	(?)
1999–2001	Hellenic	?	(?)
Total		?	(?)

International career
1994–1995	South Africa	9	(0)
- * Club domestic league appearances and goals

Andrew Tucker (born 25 December 1968) is a South African former soccer player who played at both professional and international levels as a defender. Tucker played club football for Hellenic and SuperSport United; he also earned nine caps for the South African national side between 1994 and 1995. He was part of the squad that won the 1996 African Cup of Nations. Player in excess of 400 domestic league games for Hellenic and SuperSport United.
