= Raphael Smith =

South African screenwriter (born 1973)

- Born: 29 November 1973 (age 51)
- Citizenship: South Africa
- Occupation: Screenwriter

Raphael Schrire Smith (born 29 November 1973, first name pronounced to rhyme with "playful") is a South African-born screenwriter based in London, United Kingdom. He was born in Cape Town, where he attended Herzlia Primary, Middle and High School and studied law and Jewish Civilisation at the University of Cape Town. He also holds a master's degree in screenwriting from the National Film and Television School. In 2004, he was nominated for a BAFTA as a writer on the short film Sea Monsters. In late 2004, Smith acted as the script consultant on the South African feature film Boy called Twist.

In 2008 Smith wrote the film Sidney Turtlebaum starring Derek Jacobi, which was nominated for best short film at the 2009 British Independent Film Awards and shortlisted for a 2010 Academy Award for the category best short film.
