= William Hodges (judge) =

English barrister and legal reporter

Sir William Hodges (1808–1868) was an English barrister and legal reporter, who became in 1857 chief justice of the Cape of Good Hope. He was known also as an authority on railway law.

== Life ==
The eldest son of William Hodges of Weymouth, and his wife Sarah Isaac, second daughter of William Isaac also of Weymouth, he was born at Melcombe Regis, Dorset on 29 September 1808. He educated at a private school in Salisbury and the University of London; and attended lectures of John Austin and Andrew Amos on jurisprudence and law.

Hodges was called to the bar at the Inner Temple on 3 May 1833, and went the western circuit, practising at first mainly at quarter sessions. In 1835 he began to report cases in the court of common pleas, then presided over by Sir Nicholas Tindal, from whom he received in 1837 the appointment of revising barrister for Devon and Cornwall. In 1838 he ceased reporting in the common pleas, and began to report in the Court of Queen's Bench. He acquired some parliamentary and general practice at Westminster, and drafted the Public Health Act 1848 (11 & 12 Vict. c. 63). In 1846 he was appointed recorder of Poole, Dorset.

In 1857 Hodges was appointed to the chief justiceship of the supreme court of the Cape of Good Hope, with which was associated the presidency of the legislative council and of the court of admiralty, and was knighted. He held the post until his death at Sea Point House, Cape Town, 17 August 1868. He was honoured with a public funeral.

== Works ==
Hodges published:

- Reports of Cases argued and determined in the Court of Common Pleas, cases from Hilary term 1835 to Michaelmas term 1837.
- Report of the Case of the Queen v. Lumsdaine, with Observations on the Parochial Assessment Act (1839)
- Reports of Cases argued and determined in the Court of Queen's Bench (1840) Hilary term to Michaelmas term 1838; continued, under the title of Term Reports, to 1841, and with Graham Willmore and F. L. Wollaston.
- The Law relating to the Assessment of Railways (1842).
- The Statute Law relating to Railways in England and Ireland (1845).
- The Law relating to Railways and Railway Companies (1847). It became a standard work, with seven editions, the last being by John M. Lely of the Inner Temple, 1888.

== Family ==
Hodges married in 1835 Mary Schollar, daughter of James Sanders of Weymouth; they had four sons and four daughters.
