= Robby Brink =

South African rugby union player (born 1971)

- Born: Robert Andrew Brink; 21 July 1971 (age 55) Pretoria
- Height: 1.95 m (6 ft 5 in)
- Weight: 113 kg (249 lb)
- School: Pretoria Boys High School
- University: University of Cape Town

Rugby union career
- Position: Flanker
Provincial / State sides
Years	Team	Apps	(Points)
1992–2000	Western Province	79	
2001-02	Ulster	1	
Super Rugby
Years	Team	Apps	(Points)
1998–1999	Stormers		
International career
Years	Team	Apps	(Points)
1995	South Africa	2	

Robbie Brink (born 21 July 1971) is a South African rugby union player who played for the South Africa national rugby union team. He played as a flanker.

== Career ==
Brink played for the Northern Transvaal schools team at the 1989 Craven Week tournament and after school continued his studies at the University of Cape Town. He made his provincial debut for Western Province in 1992.

He was part of the South African squad that won the 1995 Rugby World Cup where he played in two matches, the only two caps that he won.

He signed for Ulster ahead of the 2001–02 season, before being forced to retire due to a shoulder injury.

=== Test history ===
No.	Opposition	Result (SA 1st)	Position	Points	Date	Venue
1.	Romania	21–8	Flanker		30 May 1995	Danie Craven Stadium, Stellenbosch
2.	Canada	20–0	Flanker		3 Jun 1995	Boet Erasmus Stadium, Port Elizabeth

== See also ==
- List of South Africa national rugby union players – Springbok no. 626
