= Pierre Rabie =

Pierre Rabie may refer to:

- Pierre Rabie (judge)
- Pierre Rabie (politician)
