= Frans Lourens Herman Rumpff =

The Honourable Frans Lourens Herman Rumpff DMS

14th Chief Justice of South Africa
- In office 1974–1982
- Preceded by: Newton Ogilvie Thompson
- Succeeded by: Pierre Rabie

Judge of the Appellate Division
- In office 1961–1974

Judge President of the Transvaal Provincial Division of the Supreme Court of South Africa
- In office 1959–1961
- Preceded by: G. J. Maritz
- Succeeded by: Quartus de Wet

Judge of the Transvaal Provincial Division of the Supreme Court of South Africa
- In office 1951–1959

Personal details
- Born: 5 June 1912 Standerton, Transvaal, Union of South Africa (now Mpumalanga)
- Died: 4 April 1992 (aged 79) South Africa
- Education: University of Pretoria

Frans Lourens Herman Rumpff, DMS (5 June 1912 – 4 April 1992) was the Chief Justice of South Africa from 1974 to 1982.

== Early life and education ==
Born in Standerton, Transvaal, Rumpff was educated at the University of Pretoria, where he obtained a BA (1933) and LLB (1935). From 1936 to 1938, he was employed by the Department of Justice and then he became clerk of Judge Maritz of the Transvaal Provincial Division.

== Career ==
In 1938, Rumpff decided to practice as an advocate and joined the Pretoria Bar and also taught part-time in private law at the University of Pretoria. He was appointed King's Counsel in 1951. He was appointed to the Transvaal Provincial Division of the Supreme Court of South Africa in 1951, and served on the court until 1961. He was the Judge President of the court from 1959 to 1961. In 1961, he was one of the judges who acquitted all the defendants in the Treason Trial.

In 1961, he was appointed to the Appellate Division of the Supreme Court of South Africa. He became Chief Justice of South Africa in 1974 in succession to Newton Ogilvie Thompson, and served in that position until his retirement in 1982.

== See also ==
- List of Judges President of the Gauteng Division of the High Court of South Africa

Legal offices
Preceded by Newton Ogilvie Thompson	Chief Justice of South Africa; 1974-1982	Succeeded by Pieter Jacobus Rabie
