= Newton Ogilvie Thompson =

The Honourable Newton Ogilvie Thompson KC

13th Chief Justice of South Africa
- In office 1971–1974
- Preceded by: L. C. Steyn
- Succeeded by: Frans Rumpff

Judge of the Appellate Division
- In office 1958–1971

Judge of the Cape Provincial Division of the Supreme Court of South Africa
- In office 1949–1957

Personal details
- Born: 27 May 1904 Kentani, Cape Colony
- Died: 1 July 1992 (aged 88) Kenilworth, Cape Town, Cape Province, South Africa
- Education: University of Cape Town

Newton Ogilvie Thompson, KC (27 May 1904, Kentani, Cape Colony - 1 July 1992, Kenilworth, Cape Town) was a South African jurist who served as the 13th Chief Justice of South Africa, from 1971 to 1974.

== Early life and education ==
Thompson was born in Kentani in the Cape Colony. His father, also named Newton Ogilvie, was a magistrate in the Transkei. Thompson was educated at St. Andrew's College, Grahamstown and later at the University of Cape Town where obtained a B.A. and an LL.B. (with distinction) in 1924. In 1923, he captained the under-19A rugby team, which won the Western Province Union Shield.

== Career ==
After graduating from the University of Cape Town, Thompson served as the registrar to Sir Malcolm Searle, who was the Judge-President of the Cape Provincial Division of the Supreme Court of South Africa, until 1926. Thompson was admitted as an advocate in 1926, and joined the Cape Bar, joining his elder brother, Cyril Newton. In March and April 1927, Thompson acted as counsel for the accused in Rex v Holliday, a leading case on iniuria and the right to privacy and was commended by the Judge-President for having "ably represented the accused".

In 1944, he took silk as a King's Counsel. By this time, his practice was one of the biggest at the Cape Bar. Two years later, in September 1946, he accepted, along with his brother, an appointment as an acting judge on the Cape Provincial Division. In January 1949, his appointment became a permanent one.

He often gave judgments extempore and when reserved, litigants did not wait for long. His judgments were "well ordered, lucidly expressed in carefully chosen language and meticulous in their attention to the points in issue".

He became an acting judge of appeal in 1957 and became a permanent member of the Appellate Division bench in June 1958. Thompson presided over the patent law case of Gentiruco v Firestone, which at the time was the longest appeal case heard by the Appellate Division.

Thompson became Chief Justice in 1971 when Lucas Steyn (only six months older than Thompson) retired early. He served until 1974, and was succeeded by Frans Rumpff.

After leaving the Appellate Division, Thompson served on the Court of Appeal of Botswana, that country's highest court, and on those of Lesotho and Swaziland.

He was awarded an honorary doctorate in law from Rhodes University in 1972 and from the University of Cape Town in 1974.

He died in Kenilworth, Cape Town in 1992, leaving his wife, Eve, and children, Julian and Virginia.

== Bibliography ==
- Poland, Marguerite (2008). The Boy in You: A Biography of St. Andrew's College, 1855-2005. Fernwood Press. ISBN 978-1-874950-86-8.
- Zimmermann, Reinhard; Visser, D. P. (1996). Southern Cross: Civil Law and Common Law in South Africa. Clarendon Press. ISBN 978-0-19-826087-5.

Legal offices
Preceded by L. C. Steyn	Chief Justice of South Africa; 1971–1974	Succeeded by Frans Lourens Herman Rumpff
