= Lucas Cornelius Steyn =

The Right Honourable Lucas Cornelius Steyn PC, QC

12th Chief Justice of South Africa
- In office 1959–1971
- Appointed by: J. G. Strydom
- Preceded by: Henry Allan Fagan
- Succeeded by: Newton Ogilvie Thompson

Officer Administering the Government of South Africa as Chief Justice of South Africa
- In office 30 April 1961 – 31 May 1961
- Monarch: Elizabeth II
- Prime Minister: Hendrik Verwoerd
- Preceded by: Charles Roberts Swart as Governor-General
- Succeeded by: Charles Roberts Swart as State President of South Africa
- In office 26 November 1959 – 11 December 1959
- Monarch: Elizabeth II
- Prime Minister: Hendrik Verwoerd
- Preceded by: Ernest George Jansen as Governor-General
- Succeeded by: Charles Roberts Swart as Governor-General

Personal details
- Born: 21 December 1903 Geluksdam, District Viljoenskroon, Orange River Colony
- Died: 28 July 1976 (aged 72) Pretoria, Transvaal, South Africa

Lucas Cornelius Steyn, PC, QC (21 December 1903 – 28 July 1976) was Chief Justice of South Africa and, as such, acted as Governor-General on two occasions.

== Early life ==
Steyn was born in 1903 on a farm in the Orange River Colony, shortly after it had fallen under British rule during the Boer War. His parents were Christiaan Louwrens Steyn and Magdalena Josina Maria Kruger. He attended Kroonstad Secondary School and graduated with a law degree from the University of Stellenbosch in 1926, was admitted as an advocate (the South African equivalent of a barrister) in 1928, and obtained a doctorate in law in 1929.

== Legal career ==
There followed an illustrious career as a civil servant under four successive Prime Ministers. He was Attorney-General of South West Africa, which was then under South African administration, from 1931 to 1933, and worked in the Department of Justice from 1933 to 1944. He was appointed a King's Counsel in 1943. He assisted the South African delegation to the United Nations from 1946 to 1949, and was a legal adviser in the 1950 International Court of Justice hearing into South Africa's refusal to give up South West Africa.

Steyn was appointed a judge of the High Court (Transvaal Provincial Division) in 1951. Shortly thereafter, in 1955, he was promoted to the Appellate Division. And soon after that he was appointed Chief Justice, ahead of the noted liberal judge of many years' appellate experience, Oliver Schreiner. This unprecedentedly rapid ascent reflected Steyn's favour with D. F. Malan's Afrikaner nationalist administration. As Chief Justice, Steyn acted ex officio as Officer Administering the Government, i.e. acting Governor-General under a dormant commission, for the period between the death of Dr Jansen in 1959 and the installation of C.R. Swart in 1960, and again between Swart's resignation as the last Governor-General in 1961 and his inauguration as the first State President of South Africa a few weeks later. It was he who administered the oaths of office to Swart on both occasions.

Steyn's tenure as Chief Justice lasted twelve years. True to his appointment by an Afrikaner nationalist government, Steyn's jurisprudence was executive-minded and critical of English influences on South African law. He retired from the bench in 1971.

== Personal life ==
Steyn married Huibrecht van Schoor in 1928. They had two children. He died in 1976.
