= Chief Justice of South Africa =

Head of the South African judiciary

- List: 10 other official names: Hoofregter van Suid-Afrika (Afrikaans); Ijaji eliKhulu weSewula Afrika (Southern Ndebele); iJaji eyiNtloko waseMzantsi Afrika (Xhosa); IJaji eliyiNhloko yaMajaji aseNingizimu Afrika (Zulu); Lijaji Lelikhulu weleNingizimu Afrika (Swazi); Moahlodimogolo wa Afrika Borwa (Northern Sotho); Moahlodi e Moholo wa Afrika Borwa (Sotho); Moatlhodimogolo wa Aforika Borwa (Tswana); Muavanyisinkulu wa Afrika-Dzonga (Tsonga); Muhaṱuli Muhulwane wa Afrika Tshipembe (Venda)
- Flag of South Africa

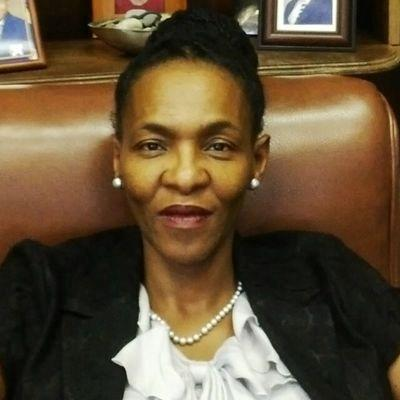
- Incumbent; Mandisa Maya since 1 September 2024
- Style: The Honourable
- Nominator: Judicial Service Commission
- Appointer: President of South Africa
- Term length: 12 years
- Inaugural holder: Lord de Villiers
- Formation: 1910
- Deputy: Deputy Chief Justice of South Africa
- Salary: R 3,072,480 per year
- Website: Office of the Chief Justice

The chief justice of South Africa is the most senior judge of the Constitutional Court and head of the judiciary of South Africa, who exercises final authority over the functioning and management of all the courts.

The position of chief justice was created upon the formation of the Union of South Africa in 1910, with the chief justice of the Cape Colony, Sir (John) Henry de Villiers (later created The 1st Baron de Villiers), being appointed the first chief justice of the newly created Appellate Division of the Supreme Court of South Africa.

Until 1961, the chief justice held a dormant commission as Officer Administering the Government, meaning that if the governor-general died or was incapacitated the chief justice would exercise the powers and duties of the governor-general. This commission was invoked in 1943 under Nicolaas Jacobus de Wet, and in 1959 and 1961 under Lucas Cornelius Steyn.

== History and creation of the post ==
The position of chief justice as it stands today was created in 2001 by the Sixth Amendment of the Constitution of South Africa, as an amalgamation of two previous high-ranking judicial positions of chief justice and president of the Constitutional Court. The chief justice therefore now presides over the Constitutional Court. The position of the presiding judge of the Supreme Court of Appeal of South Africa, the successor court to the Appellate Division, was as a consequence renamed President of the Supreme Court of Appeal.

== Chief Justice in a new era ==
At the time of South Africa's democratisation in the early 1990s, the position of chief justice was held by University of Cambridge graduate and Second World War veteran Michael Corbett. Corbett took office in 1989, succeeding Chief Justice P.J. Rabie, who had been scheduled to retire in 1986 at the statutory retirement age of 70, but had had his tenure in office extended on an ad hoc basis by state president P.W. Botha.

However, with the fall of Apartheid imminent, the progressively-minded Corbett was eventually handed the job of chief justice in 1989. Although appointed by the National Party government, Corbett was generally well liked by those in South Africa's new African National Congress (ANC)-led government, and upon his retirement in 1996 was given a formal state banquet where President Mandela paid tribute to the chief justice's "passion for justice", "sensitivity to racial discrimination", "intellectual rigour" and "clarity of thought".

The first chief justice to be appointed in post-apartheid South Africa was Ismail Mahomed, a leading South African jurist of Indian descent, who was selected to succeed Corbett in 1997 and eventually took office in 1998. Mahomed held the position until his death in 2000.

Under South Africa's Interim Constitution of 1993 and later the Final Constitution, the importance of the position of chief justice as the position of final judicial authority was temporarily relegated beneath that of the president of the newly created Constitutional Court. Ismail Mohammed had been tipped widely for the job of Constitutional Court president but in 1994, President Nelson Mandela appointed leading human rights lawyer and director of the Legal Resources Centre Arthur Chaskalson to the position. In 2001, after Mohammed's death and, consequently, with the position of chief justice vacant, the Sixth Amendment of the Constitution of South Africa fused the positions of chief justice and president of the Constitutional Court into one single job of chief justice. Chaskalson was subsequently appointed to the new post, although his tasks remained effectively the same.

== Chief justices of Cape Colony ==
- 1812– Sir Johannes Andries Truter (Vice-Admiralty Court)
- 1827–1855 Sir John Wylde

*1828 Supreme Court established

- 1855–1858 Sir Sidney Smith Bell (acting)
- 1858–1868 Sir William Hodges
- 1868–1874 Sir Sidney Smith Bell
- 1874–1910 John de Villiers, 1st Baron de Villiers

== Chief justices of Natal (1856–1910) ==
- 1858–1874 Walter Harding
- 1874–1890 Sir Henry Connor
- 1890–1901 Michael Henry Gallwey
- 1901–1910 Sir Henry Bale (died 1910)

== Chief justices of Orange Free State (1875–1919) ==
List
No.	Chief Justice	Image	Tenure
1	Francis William Reitz (1844-1934)		1874 - 1888
2	Melius de Villiers (1849-1938)		1889 - 1900
3	Andries Maasdorp (1847 - 1931)		1902 - 1919

== Chief justices of Transvaal (1877–1910) ==
List
No.	Chief Justice	Image	Tenure
1	John Gilbert Kotze (1849-1940)		1881
2	Reinhold Gregorowsky (1856-1922)		1898
3	James Rose Innes (1855-1942)		1902 - 1910

== Chief justices of South Africa (1910 - present) ==
List of Chief Justices
No.	Chief Justice	Image	Tenure
1	John de Villiers, 1st Baron de Villiers (1842-1914)		1910 - 1914
2	James Rose Innes (1855-1942)		1914 - 1927
3	William Henry Solomon (1852-1930)		1927 - 1929
4	Jacob de Villiers (1868-1932)		1929 - 1932
5	John Wessels (1862-1936)		1932 - - 1936
6	John Stephen Curlewis (1863-1940)		1936 - 1938
7	James Stratford (1869-1952)		1938 - 1939
8	Nicolaas Jacobus de Wet (1873-1960)		1939 - 1943
9	Ernest Frederick Watermeyer (1880-1958)		1943 - 1950
10	Albert van der Sandt Centlivres (1887-1966)		1950 - 1957
11	Henry Allan Fagan (1889-1963)		1957 - 1959
12	Lucas Cornelius Steyn (1903-1976)		1959 - - 1971
13	Newton Ogilvie Thompson (1904-1992)		1971 - 1974
14	Frans Lourens Herman Rumpff (1912-1992)		1974 - 1982
15	Pierre Rabie (1917-1997)		1982 - 1989
16	Michael Corbett (judge) (1923-1997)		1989 - 1996
17	Ismail Mahomed (1931-2000)		1997 - 2000
18	Arthur Chaskalson (1931-2012)		2001 - 2005
19	Pius Langa (1939-2013)		2005 - 2009
20	Sandile Ngcobo (1953)		2009 - 2011
21	Mogoeng Mogoeng (1961)		2011 - 2021
22	Raymond Zondo (1960)		2022 - 2024
23	Mandisa Maya (1964)		2024 -

== See also ==
- Constitutional Court of South Africa
- Constitution of South Africa
