= South African Class 5E1, Series 5 =

Class of 225 South African electric locomotives

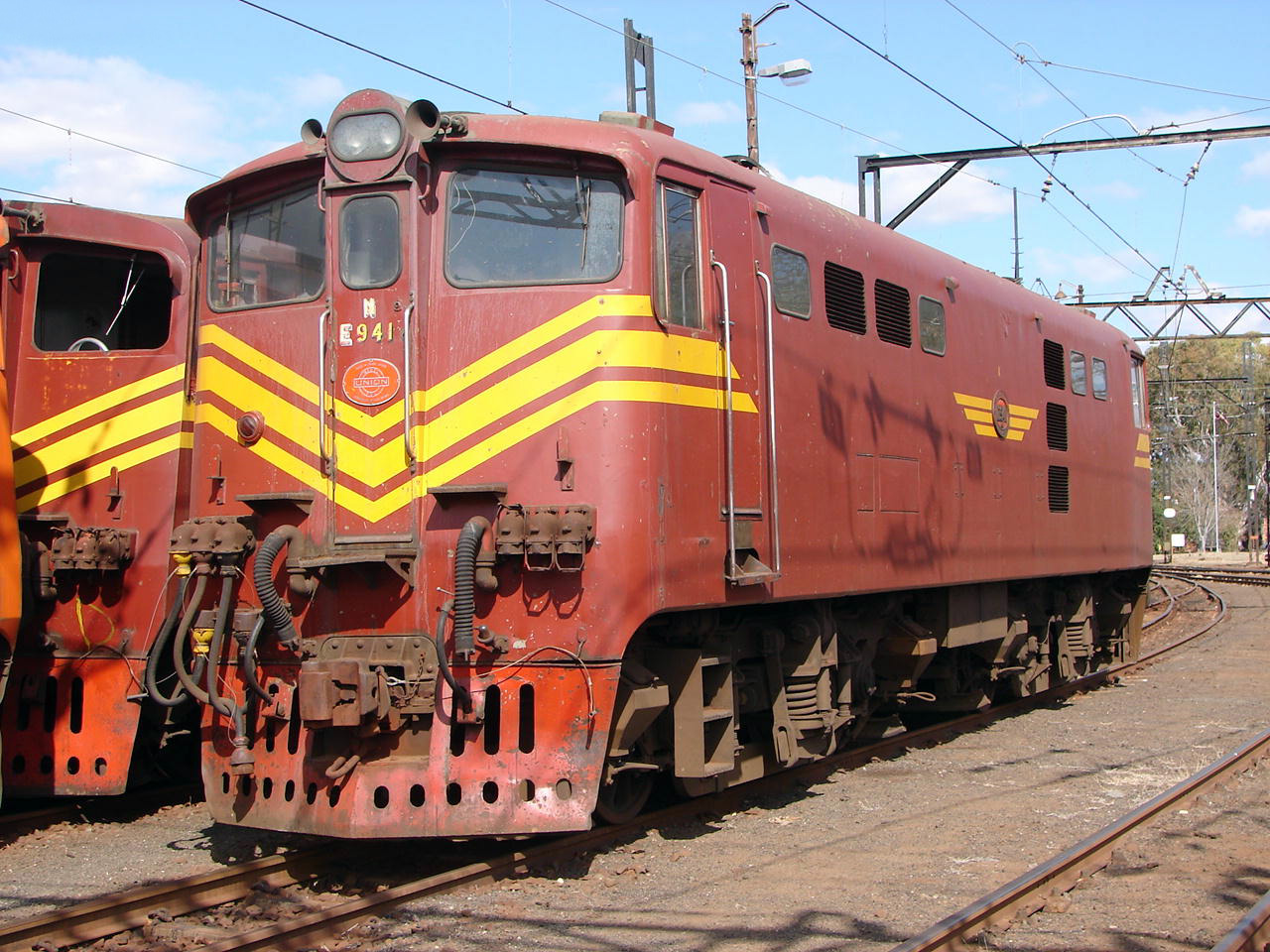
- No. E941, with rounded corners, at Ladysmith, KwaZulu-Natal, 5 August 2007
Type and origin
- Power type: Electric
- Designer: Metropolitan-Vickers
- Builder: Union Carriage & Wagon
- Model: MV 5E1
- Build date: 1966–1968
- Total produced: 225
Specifications
- Configuration
  - AAR: B-B
  - UIC: Bo'Bo'
  - Commonwealth: Bo-Bo
- Gauge: 3 ft 6 in (1,067 mm) Cape gauge
- Wheel diameter: 1,220 mm (48.03 in)
- Wheelbase: 11,279 mm (37 ft 1/16 in)
  - Bogie: 3,430 mm (11 ft 3 1/16 in)
- Pivot centres: 7,849 mm (25 ft 9 in)
- Panto shoes: 6,972 mm (22 ft 10 1/2 in)
- Length
  - Over couplers: 15,494 mm (50 ft 10 in)
  - Over body: 14,631 mm (48 ft 0 in)
- Width: 2,896 mm (9 ft 6 in)
- Height
  - Pantograph: 4,089 mm (13 ft 5 in)
  - Body height: 3,937 mm (12 ft 11 in)
- Axle load: 21,591 kg (47,600 lb)
- Adhesive weight: 86,364 kg (190,400 lb)
- Loco weight: 86,364 kg (190,400 lb)
- Electric system/s: 3 kV DC catenary
- Current pickup(s): Pantographs
- Traction motors: Four AEI-281BX
  - Rating 1 hour: 485 kW (650 hp)
  - Continuous: 364 kW (488 hp)
- Gear ratio: 18:67
- Loco brake: Air & Regenerative
- Train brakes: Vacuum
- Couplers: AAR knuckle
Performance figures
- Maximum speed: 97 km/h (60 mph)
- Power output
  - 1 hour: 1,940 kW (2,600 hp)
  - Continuous: 1,456 kW (1,953 hp)
- Tractive effort
  - Starting: 250 kN (56,000 lbf)
  - 1 hour: 184 kN (41,000 lbf)
  - Continuous: 122 kN (27,000 lbf) @ 40 km/h (25 mph)
Career
- Operators: South African Railways; Spoornet; Rovos Rail
- Class: Class 5E1
- Number in class: 225
- Numbers: E921-E1145
- Delivered: 1966–1969
- First run: 1966

The South African Railways Class 5E1, Series 5 of 1966 was an electric locomotive.

Between 1966 and 1969, the South African Railways placed 225 Class 5E1, Series 5 electric locomotives with a Bo-Bo wheel arrangement in mainline service.

== Manufacturer ==
Series 5 of the Metropolitan-Vickers-designed 3 kV DC Class 5E1 electric locomotive was built for the South African Railways (SAR) by Union Carriage and Wagon (UCW) in Nigel, Transvaal, with the electrical equipment being supplied by Associated Electrical Industries (AEI) and English Electric (EE).

The 225 Series 5 locomotives were delivered between 1966 and 1969, numbered in the range from E921 to E1145. The Series 5 were equipped with four AEI 281 BX axle-hung traction motors fitted with roller bearings. UCW did not allocate builder's numbers to the locomotives it built for the SAR and used the SAR unit numbers for their record keeping.

== Body shape alteration ==
From the introduction of the Class 5E, Series 1 in 1955, the body shape of the locomotive remained virtually unchanged apart from the roofline on the roof access ladder side, where the Class 5E had a single cut-out in line with the vertical row of three grilles on the body side while the Class 5E1 had an additional cut-out in line with the small window to the right of the two grilles aft of the roof access ladder. All these units had round headlamps and rounded corners on their cab ends.

This body shape was changed to smaller round headlamps and squared body corners part-way through the construction of the Series 5. The first 25 Series 5 units in the number range from E921 to E945 were built with the same large round headlamps and rounded body corners as before, but from no. E946 the next 200 were delivered with smaller headlights and the new body shape which gave them the appearance of being wider. The change was possibly motivated by cost considerations since the squared corners would simplify construction and since the rounded corners served no purpose other than cosmetic.

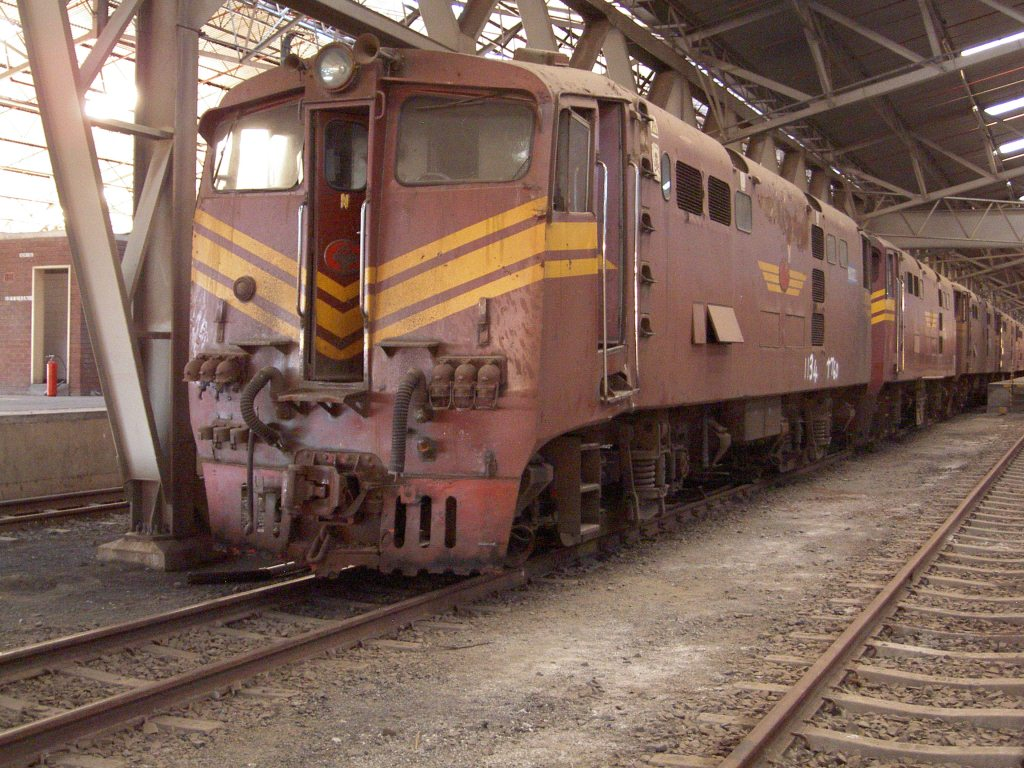
No. E1134

Other identifying features remained the same, such as the three small square access panels on the lower sides above the battery box instead of the two larger rectangular panels in the same position on the Series 1 and 2 units. Exceptions appear to be some Series 5 units in the number range higher than no. E1127. An example is depicted alongside showing a damaged no. E1134 with two rectangular access panels above the battery box instead of three small square ones, but still with one small square and one larger rectangular access panels on the lower sides above the second axle from the left. The picture also illustrates the new front with squared corners and a smaller round headlight.

== Headlamps ==
In the 1970s most serving SAR steam and electric locomotives had their original large round headlamps replaced by less attractive but more efficient double sealed-beam automobile headlamps. On Series 3, 4 and early series 5 units, the original round headlamp housing was retained and the glass was replaced by a metal disk containing the sealed beam headlamps. On Series 5 units with squared corners, the smaller round headlamp was replaced by sealed-beam automobile headlamps on the original or a similar rectangular backing plate above the end door.

== Service ==
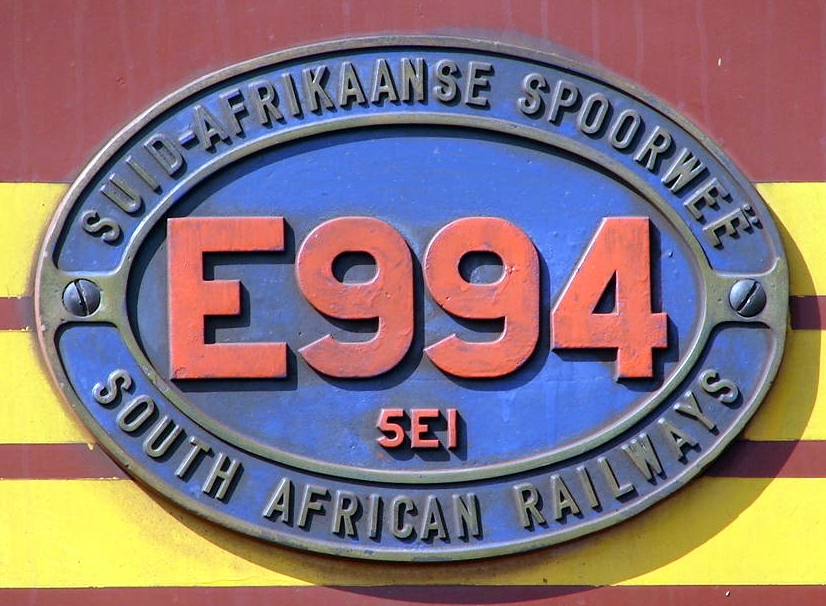
builder's plate

The Class 5E1 family served in goods and passenger working on all 3 kV DC electrified mainlines country-wide for about forty years. They worked the vacuum-braked goods and mainline passenger trains over the lines radiating south, west and north of Durban almost exclusively until the mid-1970s and the Class 6E1 only became regular motive power in Natal when air-braked car trains began running between Durban and the Reef. By the mid-2000s, most of the Series 5 locomotives had been withdrawn.

== Liveries ==
The whole series was delivered in the Gulf Red livery with signal red cowcatchers, yellow whiskers, full body-length side-stripes and with the number plates on the sides enclosed in three-stripe wings. In the 1970s the side-stripes were curtailed to just beyond the cab-sides, but with the number plates on the sides still enclosed in three-stripe wings. In the 1990s many of the Series 5 units were repainted in the Spoornet orange livery.

== Modification ==
By 2007 two Series 5 locomotives, numbers E1101 and E1102, had been modified extensively. It involved a complete strip-down overhaul to rebuild them as prototypes with the object to determine if large-scale Class 5E1 rebuilding would be economically viable.

Some visible external differences from the originals were side window screens, higher side doors with a curved rainwater gutter above it (not done on E1101) and reinforcing under the side doors and side windows. On the roof access ladder side the cut-outs on the roof edge were filled in and the units were repainted in the then current Spoornet blue livery with outline numbers, the only Class 5E1s to receive this livery. They were also equipped with driver's consoles similar to those which were later fitted to the Class 18Es.

No further such rebuilds were done. By 2010, these two units were shedded at Danskraal in Ladysmith and used to push road trainers, modified cabooses with Class 5E1 controls installed in one end, that are used to familiarise drivers with routes.

== Rovos Rail ==
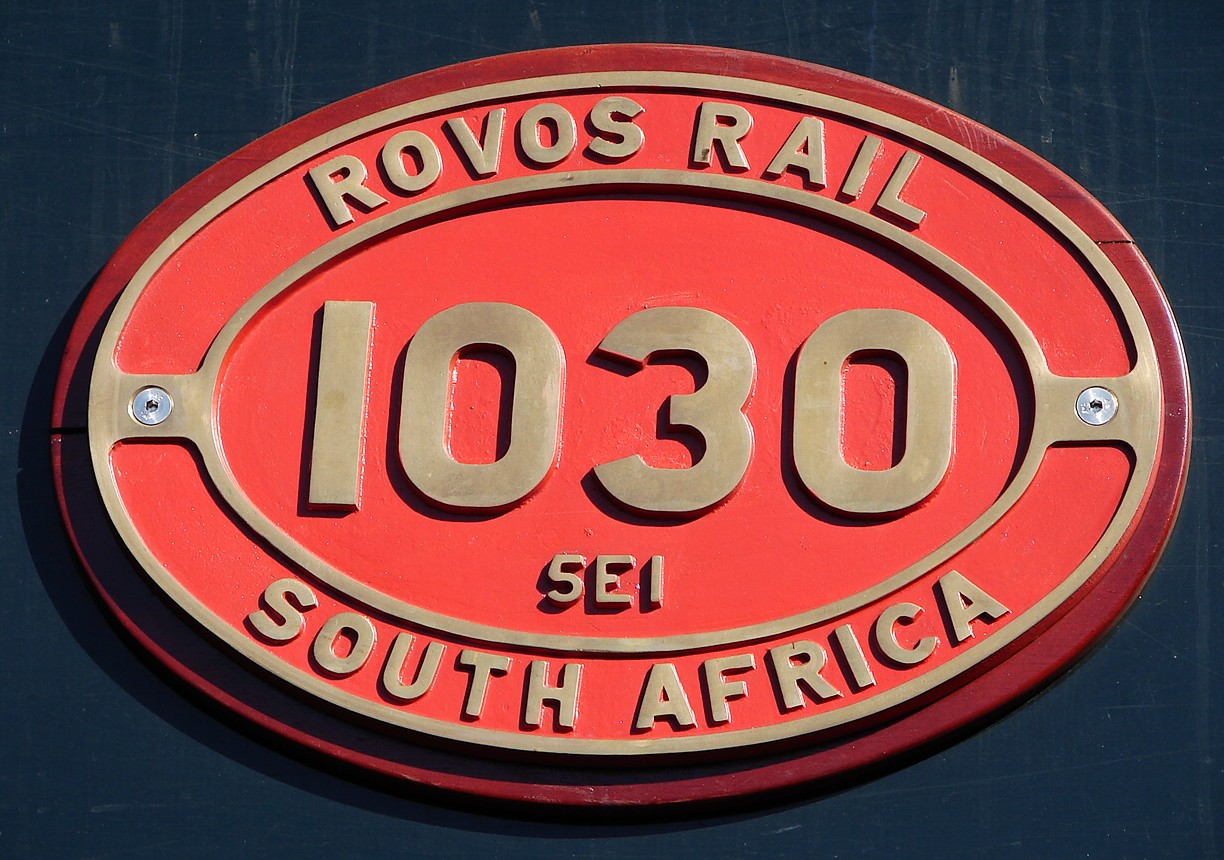
builder's plate

Several Series 5 locomotives were sold at auction during 2010. Most were bought by scrap dealers and cut up, but some survived to start a second career. Nine Class 5E1, Series 5 units were purchased by Rovos Rail, a private operator of luxury rail tours which is based at Capital Park in Pretoria. Rovos Rail is reviving the tradition of brass number plates on the sides of their locomotives.

== Years of construction and disposal ==
The known years of construction based on the observation of the UCW works plates on the end doors of units, and the post-withdrawal disposition of the Class 5E1, Series 5 are listed in the table.

Class 5E1, Series 5
Loco no.	Year built	Rebuilt or sold
E921	1966	
E922	1966	
E923	1966	
E924	1966	
E925	1966	
E926	1966	
E927	1966	
E928	1966	
E929	1966	
E930	1966	
E931	1966	
E932	1966	
E933	1966	
E934	1966	
E935	1966	
E936	1966	
E937	1966	
E938	1966	
E939	1966	
E940	1966	
E941	1966	
E942	1966	
E943	1966	
E944	1966	
E945	1966	
E946	1966–67	
E947	1966–67	
E948	1966–67	
E949	1966–67	
E950	1966–67	
E951	1966–67	
E952	1966–67	
E953	1966–67	
E954	1966–67	
E955	1966–67	
E956	1966–67	
E957	1966–67	
E958	1966–67	
E959	1966–67	
E960	1966–67	
E961	1966–67	
E962	1966–67	
E963	1966–67	
E964	1966–67	
E965	1966–67	
E966	1966–67	
E967	1966–67	
E968	1966–67	
E969	1966–67	
E970	1966–67	
E971	1966–67	
E972	1966–67	
E973	1966–67	
E974	1966–67	
E975	1966–67	
E976	1966–67	
E977	1966–67	
E978	1966–67	
E979	1966–67	
E980	1966–67	
E981	1966–67	
E982	1966–67	
E983	1966–67	
E984	1966–67	
E985	1966–67	
E986	1966–67	
E987	1966–67	
E988	1966–67	
E989	1966–67	
E990	1966–67	
E991	1966–67	
E992	1966–67	
E993	1966–67	
E994	1966–67	
E995	1966–67	
E996	1966–67	
E997	1966–67	
E998	1966–67	
E999	1966–67	
E1000	1966–67	
E1001	1966–67	
E1002	1966–67	
E1003	1966–67	
E1004	1966–67	
E1005	1966–67	
E1006	1966–67	
E1007	1966–67	
E1008	1966–67	
E1009	1966–67	
E1010	1966–67	
E1011	1966–67	
E1012	1966–67	
E1013	1966–67	
E1014	1966–67	
E1015	1966–67	
E1016	1966–67	
E1017	1966–67	
E1018	1966–67	
E1019	1966–67	
E1020	1966–67	
E1021	1966–67	
E1022	1966–67	
E1023	1966–67	
E1024	1966–67	
E1025	1966–67	
E1026	1966–67	
E1027	1966–67	
E1028	1966–67	
E1029	1966–67	
E1030	1966–67	Rovos
E1031	1966–67	
E1032	1966–67	
E1033	1966–67	
E1034	1966–67	
E1035	1966–67	
E1036	1966–67	
E1037	1966–67	
E1038	1966–67	
E1039	1966–67	
E1040	1967	
E1041	1967–69	
E1042	1967–69	
E1043	1967–69	
E1044	1967–69	Rovos
E1045	1967–69	
E1046	1967–69	
E1047	1967–69	
E1048	1967–69	
E1049	1967–69	
E1050	1967–69	
E1051	1967–69	
E1052	1967–69	
E1053	1967–69	
E1054	1967–69	
E1055	1967–69	
E1056	1967–69	
E1057	1967–69	
E1058	1967–69	
E1059	1967–69	
E1060	1967–69	
E1061	1967–69	
E1062	1967–69	
E1063	1967–69	
E1064	1967–69	
E1065	1967–69	
E1066	1967–69	
E1067	1967–69	
E1068	1967–69	
E1069	1967–69	
E1070	1967–69	
E1071	1967–69	
E1072	1967–69	
E1073	1967–69	
E1074	1967–69	
E1075	1967–69	
E1076	1967–69	
E1077	1967–69	
E1078	1967–69	
E1079	1967–69	
E1080	1967–69	
E1081	1967–69	
E1082	1967–69	
E1083	1967–69	
E1084	1967–69	
E1085	1967–69	
E1086	1967–69	
E1087	1967–69	
E1088	1967–69	
E1089	1967–69	
E1090	1967–69	
E1091	1967–69	Rovos
E1092	1967–69	
E1093	1967–69	
E1094	1967–69	
E1095	1967–69	
E1096	1967–69	
E1097	1967–69	
E1098	1967–69	
E1099	1967–69	
E1100	1967–69	
E1101	1967–69	Rebuilt
E1102	1967–69	Rebuilt
E1103	1967–69	
E1104	1967–69	Rovos
E1105	1967–69	Rovos
E1106	1967–69	
E1107	1967–69	
E1108	1967–69	
E1109	1967–69	
E1110	1967–69	
E1111	1967–69	
E1112	1967–69	
E1113	1967–69	
E1114	1967–69	Rovos
E1115	1967–69	Rovos
E1116	1967–69	
E1117	1967–69	
E1118	1967–69	
E1119	1967–69	
E1120	1967–69	
E1121	1967–69	
E1122	1967–69	
E1123	1967–69	Rovos
E1124	1967–69	
E1125	1967–69	
E1126	1967–69	
E1127	1967–69	Rovos
E1128	1967–69	
E1129	1967–69	
E1130	1967–69	
E1131	1967–69	
E1132	1967–69	
E1133	1967–69	
E1134	1967–69	
E1135	1967–69	
E1136	1967–69	
E1137	1967–69	
E1138	1967–69	
E1139	1967–69	
E1140	1967–69	
E1141	1967–69	
E1142	1967–69	
E1143	1967–69	
E1144	1967–69	
E1145	1967–69	

== Illustration ==
The main picture shows no. E941 with rounded corners, while the first picture below shows no. E948 with squared corners, both in the modified SAR Gulf Red and whiskers livery. The rest of the pictures illustrate some of the liveries which were applied to Series 5 locomotives.

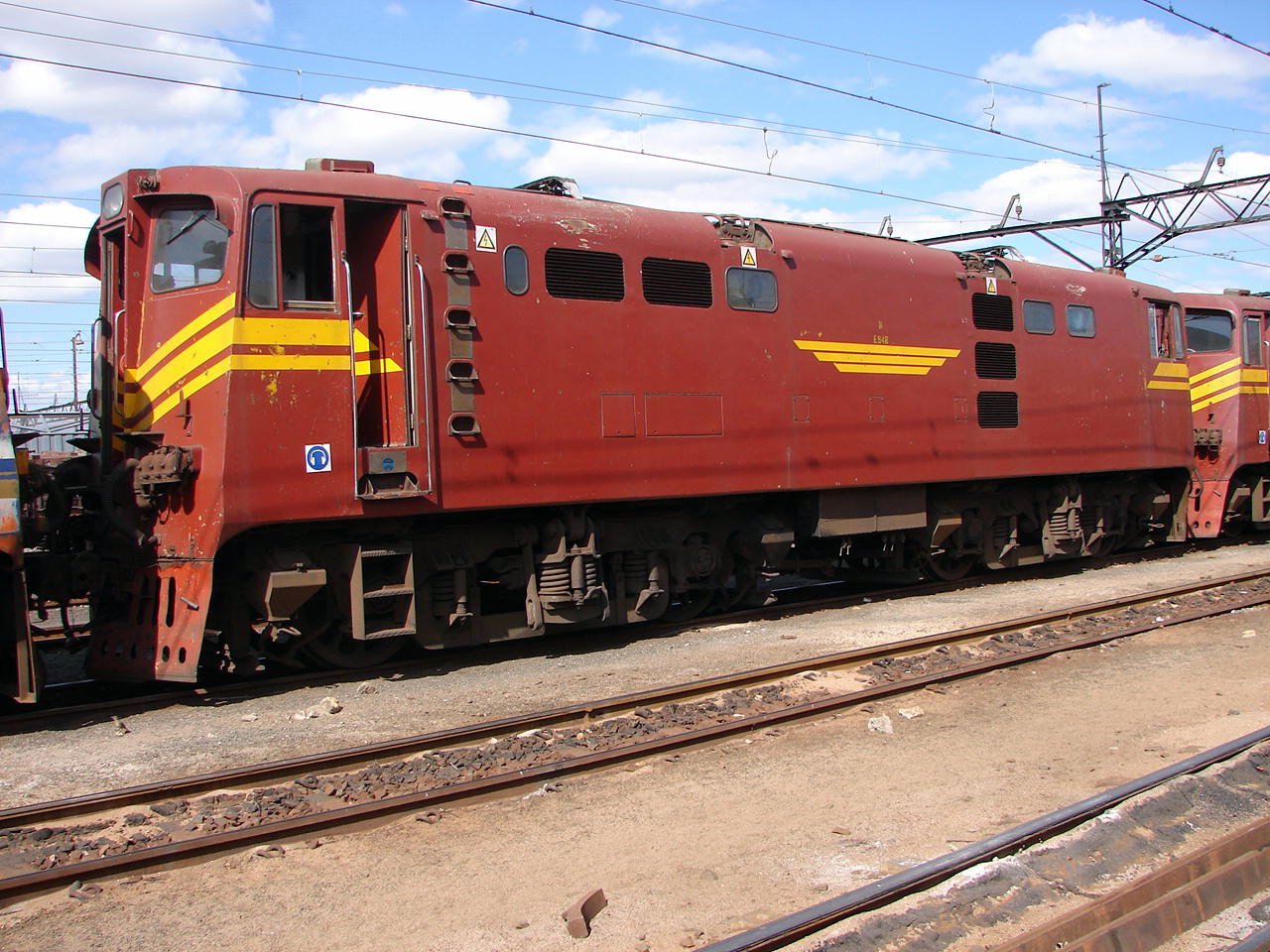
No. E948 with squared corners in SAR Gulf Red, Ladysmith, 5 August 2007

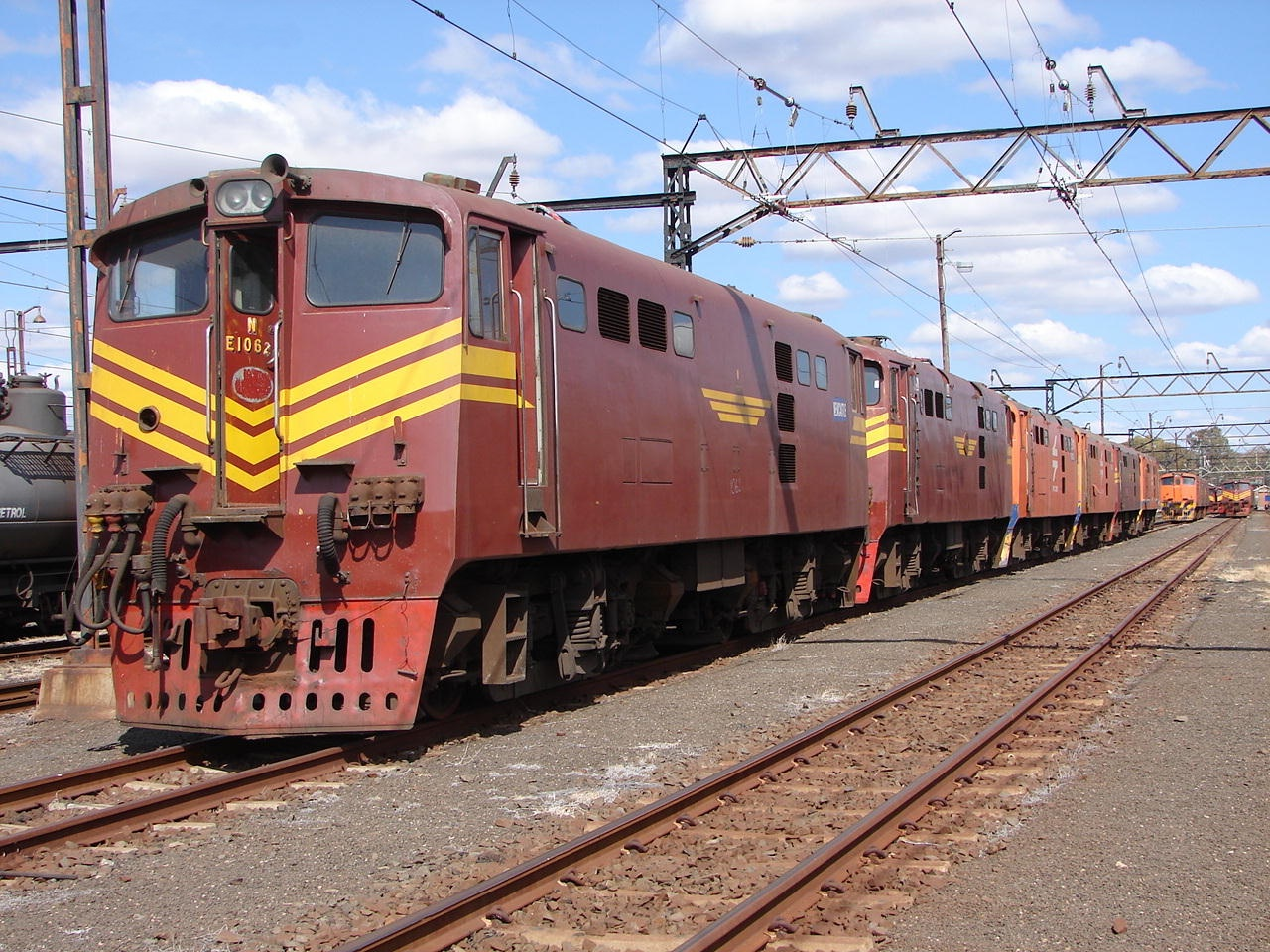
No. E1062 shortly before being sold at auction, at Ladysmith, 5 August 2007

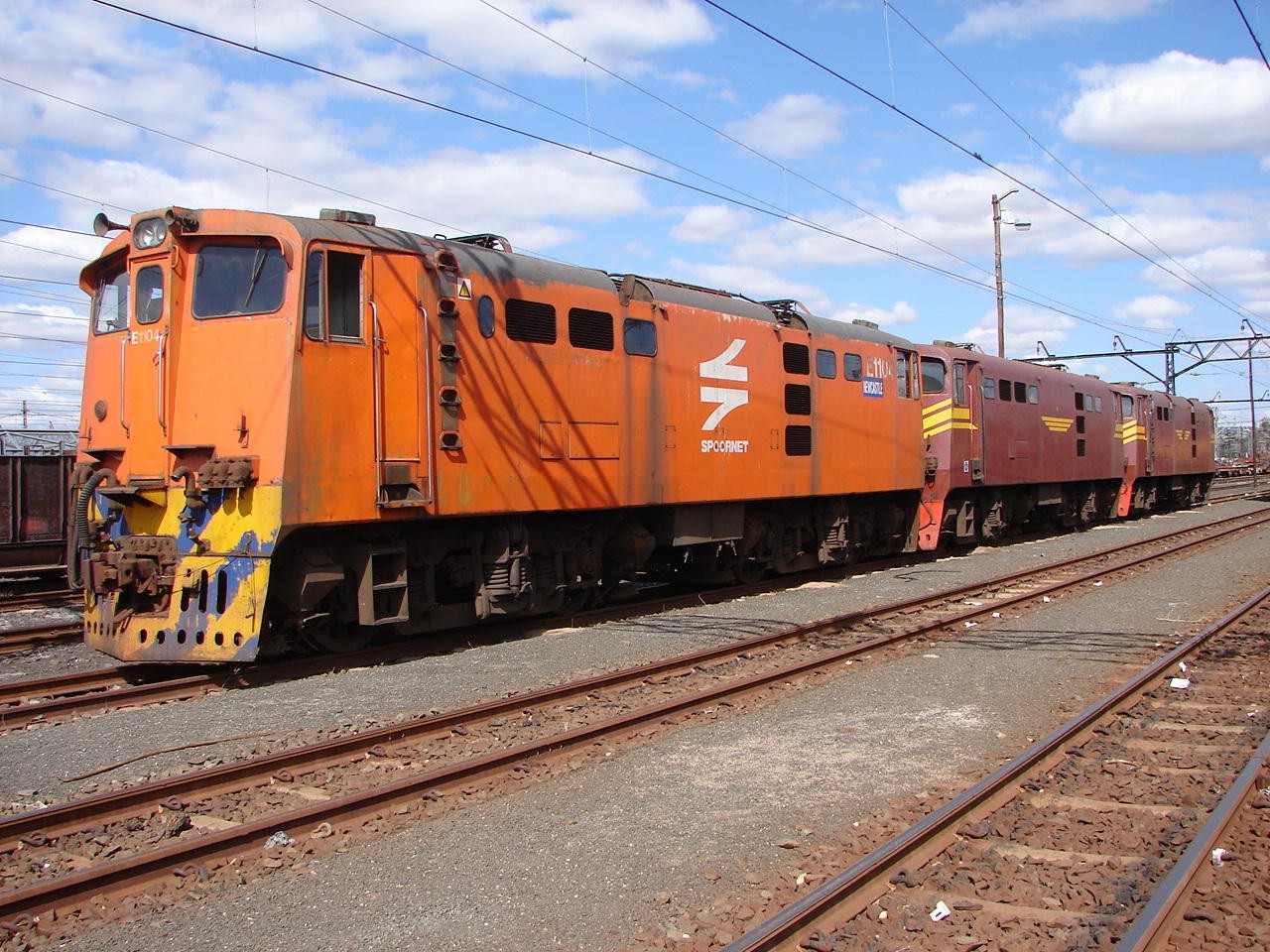
No. E1104 in Spoornet orange livery at Ladysmith, 5 August 2007

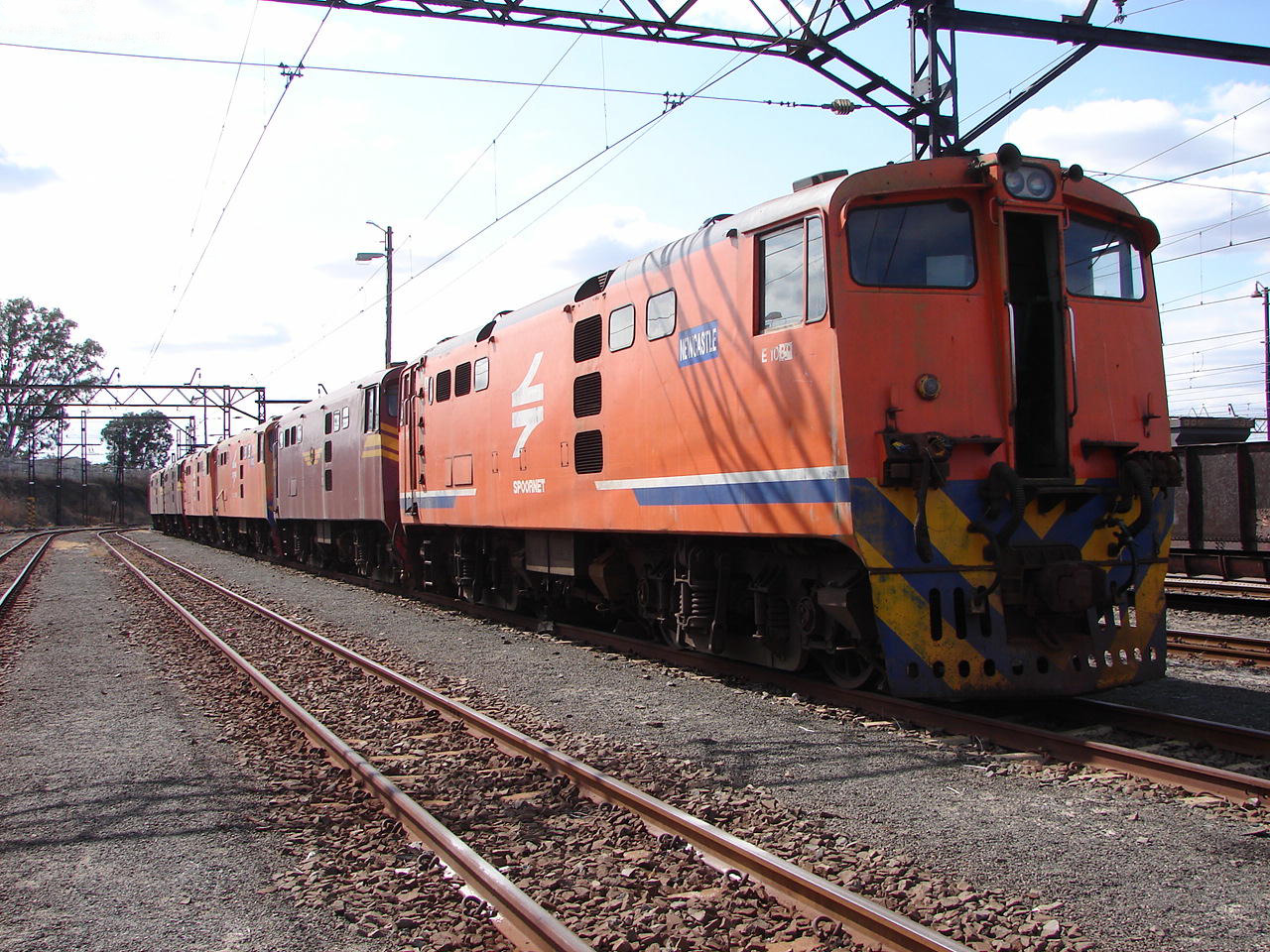
No. E1089 in Spoornet lined orange livery at Ladysmith, 5 August 2007

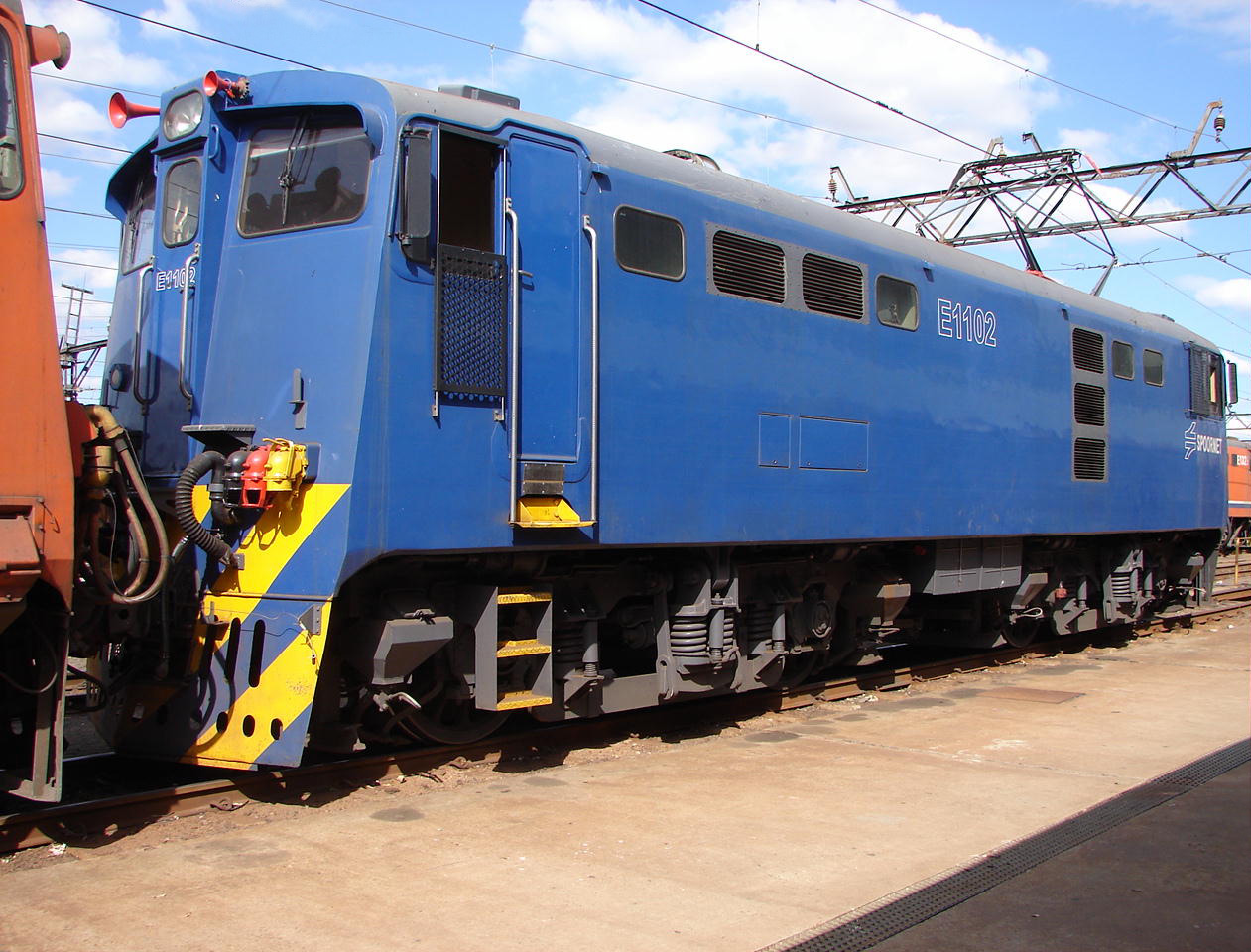
No. E1102 in Spoornet blue with outline numbers at Ladysmith, 5 August 2007

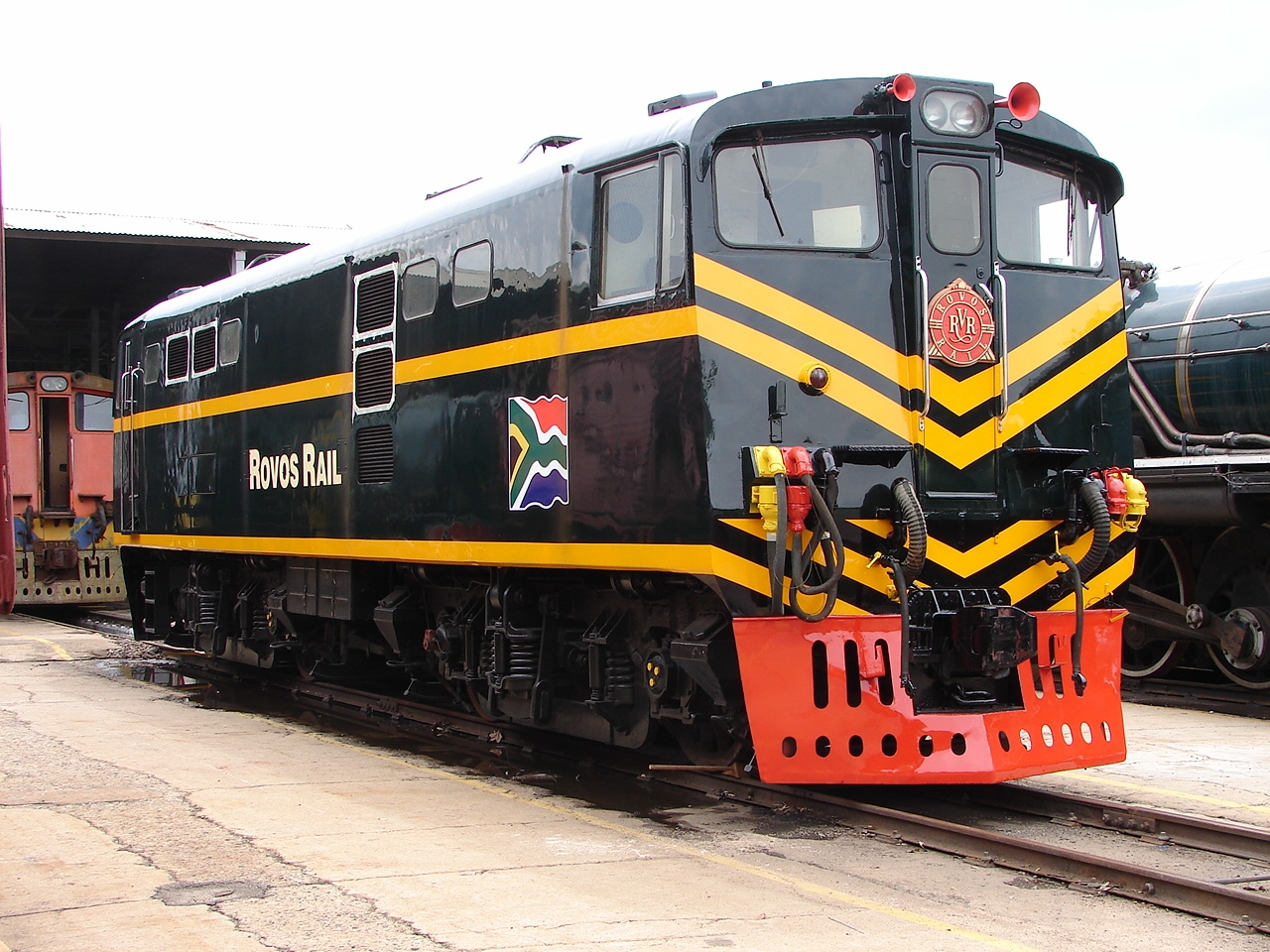
No. E1114 in Rovos Rail's livery at Capital Park, Pretoria, 5 October 2009
