= Cam switch =

Switch whose contacts are opened and closed by rotating cams

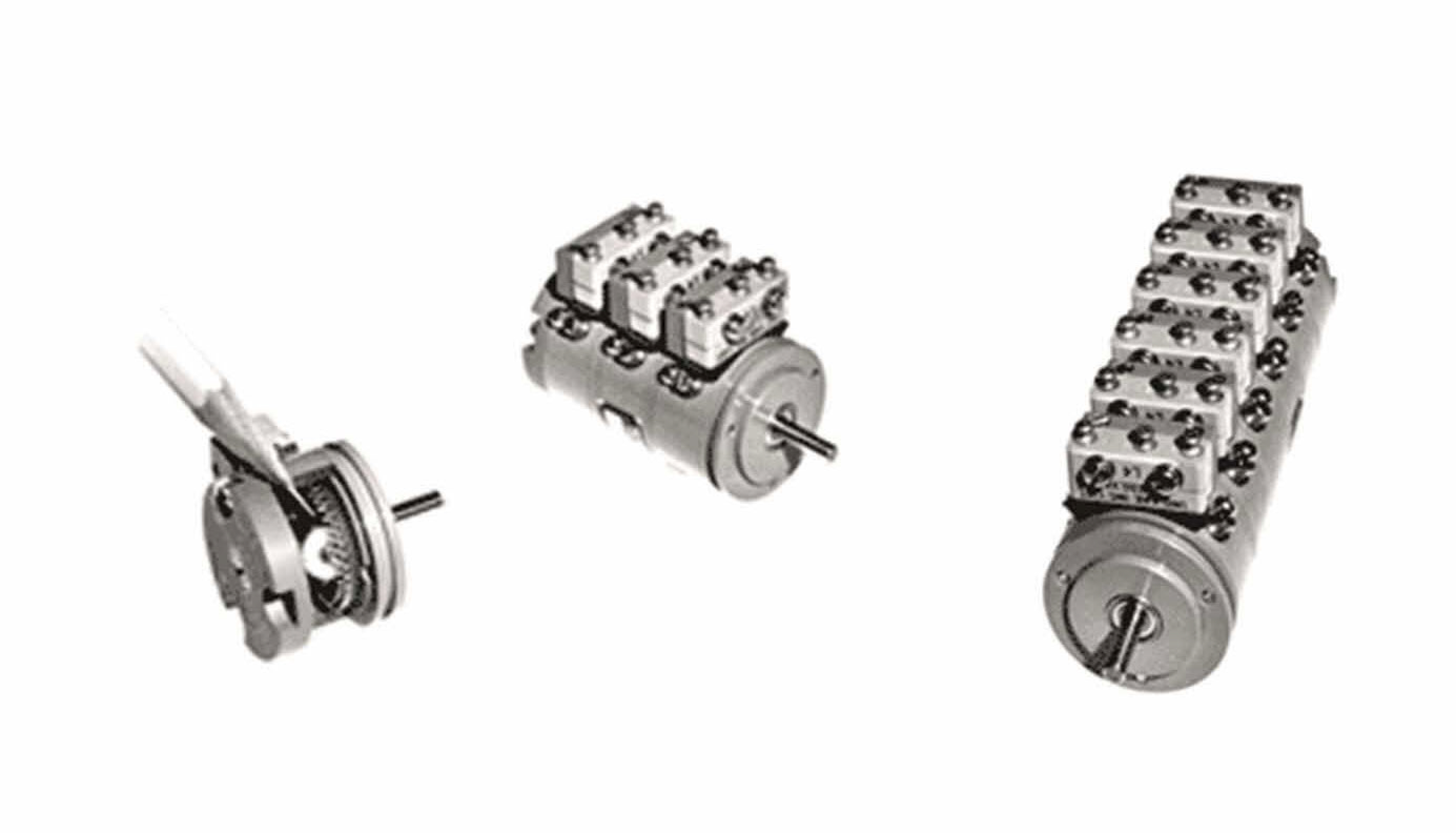

Cam switches are mainly used within the low voltage range. On a shaft, switching cams are made of abrasion-resistant conductive material. By rotating the shaft, the contacts are opened or closed by the cams. Often, a plurality of cams are seated on a shaft, which simultaneously switch or switch several pairs of contacts.

== History ==
Friedrich Natalis (1864–1935), who had been working for the Schuckert-Werke (later Siemens-Schuckertwerke) since 1897, had already developed the cam-switching principle in Germany before 1900. In 1895, however, Johann Sigmund Schuckert founder of the electrical engineering company Schuckert & Co supplied cam switches with cam rollers and spring-loaded individual switches (DRP 88586). Thus the term cam switch has been used for such and similar devices over the years. Schuckert also supplied the "carbon control switch" designed by Natalis since 1901 with copper-carbon switching devices with spark-blowers (common spark blowers for direct current or single-spark blowers for direct and alternating current). The main current cam switch retained some significance, even when the rifle control pushed it where it was more economical. In miniature machine construction, the cam switch probably did not appear until the early 1930s. In 1931 the American company General Electric GE released their switch SBl, a 20A auxiliary current control switch, basically a miniaturized image of the large main current control switches. The devices had simple interruption and silver crossover, in some cases they were equipped with a snap mechanism. In Europe around 1940, the first cam switch from Ghielmetti, Solothurn / Switzerland, began to replace conventional roller switches. Switches could also be supplied as auxiliary current control switches with corresponding circuits. They were marketed under the trade name Ghielmetti-Clavier. In September 1948, Kraus & Naimer (of Vienna) produced C15 (15 A), the first company-owned cam switch. In 1949, the company also presented the world's first cam-designed cam switch. At the beginning of 1950, Kraus & Naimer cam switches C30 (30A) were followed with the same design. The Kraus & Naimer cam switches C16 to C200, which came into the market in the spring of 1951, had a decisive influence on the advancement of the cam switch and the introduction of the roller switch in electrical engineering. They had a double interruption and a motor switching capacity appropriate to the rated current. The large number of possible combinations and the extensive additional equipment as characteristic features were responsible for the later development of cam switches as an industrial standard. Kraus & Naimer developed the world's smallest cam switch (model CA4N), which is in the market since 1994.

Precision Mechanisms Corp. (PMC) was started by Leon N. Canick & Charles S Aldrich, the original company President & Vice President respectively, both Chief Engineers in 1957. Mr. Canick was a graduate of Columbia University, a mechanical engineer by trade. Mr. Aldrich was a graduate of Cooper Union University and also a mechanical engineer by trade. Both were former employees of Bell Labs, and also Servo Mechanisms Corp. where they both held senior mechanical engineering positions. Mr. Aldrich (Charlie to most) was credited with the design of the PMC Cam Switch and was the creative and innovative individual behind the scenes, whereas Leon was responsible for the business side of the company. The primary application include throttle control modules, flap/slat position controls, landing gear controls, bay door control and position indication, and in other similar functions where a rotary control and/or position monitoring are required. The uniqueness of our products is in the air design for weight and size and the ease of adjustment of the cam mechanisms. The patented cam mechanisms on each individual stack allow to accurately set desired angles even under conditions of corresponding shad linkage variations, especially when working with detentes. For switching purposes, we use exclusively Honeywell micro-switches only. Low loads are handled with application of golf contacts. Reliability is a high reaching millions of cycles for mechanical life and hundreds of thousands for electrical life. We design and manufacture our own gear boxes in combination with our cam switches and procured synchros and/or potentiometeres. We make cable assemblies and are qualified in Mil-Std-2000 soldering and harness manufacturing procedures. Our statistical process control system had been approved and certified by Lockheed Martin. A Low Torque, Precision Component with Adjustable Snap-Action Switching

• Adjusts to any desired switch dwell angle from 3° to 357 ° of shaft rotation. • Switch settings infinitely adjustable with respect to shaft. • Switch setting independent of other switches in stack • Switching angles cane be set and locked in seconds • Adjustments can be made while shaft is either stationary or rotating • Only 1-1/16" diameter; equivalent of BuOrd Size 11. The PMC Model CS 402 Cam Switch combines in a compact 1-1/16" diameter unit all the functions of a conventional plate cam, cam follower and snap-action switch. External screwdriver adjustments permit rapid setting of any desired switch make angle. Designed for timing, indication, control, computation and other applications where snap action switching is required, it permits the instrument and servo designer to meet specific application requirements through use of a single component that can be mounted in a gear assembly in a manner similar to synchros, potentiometers and other rotating shaft components. Because the CS 402 Cam Switch replaces conventional cam mechanisms, independently mounted switches and their associated hardware, it provides significant savings in design, fabrication and assembly time. Its small size permits significant improvements in miniaturization of the end product. Adjustment of the CS 402 Cam Switch can be accomplished rapidly and precisely while the shaft is either stationary or rotating, by means of two external adjusting screws, and can be completed within seconds. As a result, it provides a unique means for ‘trimming-in’ required performance in production or during equipment maintenance. Conveniently located locking screws maintain switch settings under all conditions of shock and vibration encountered by military equipment. Model CS 402 Cam Switches incorporate standard type SPDT, subminiature, snap switches and are available as single-switch units, or as multi-ganged types with as many as 10 switches. Both single and multi-stack types can be supplied with double-ended shaft for mounting dial or indicator. All types meet applicable requirements of MIL-E-5400.
