= South African Class 5E, Series 1 =

Electric locomotive

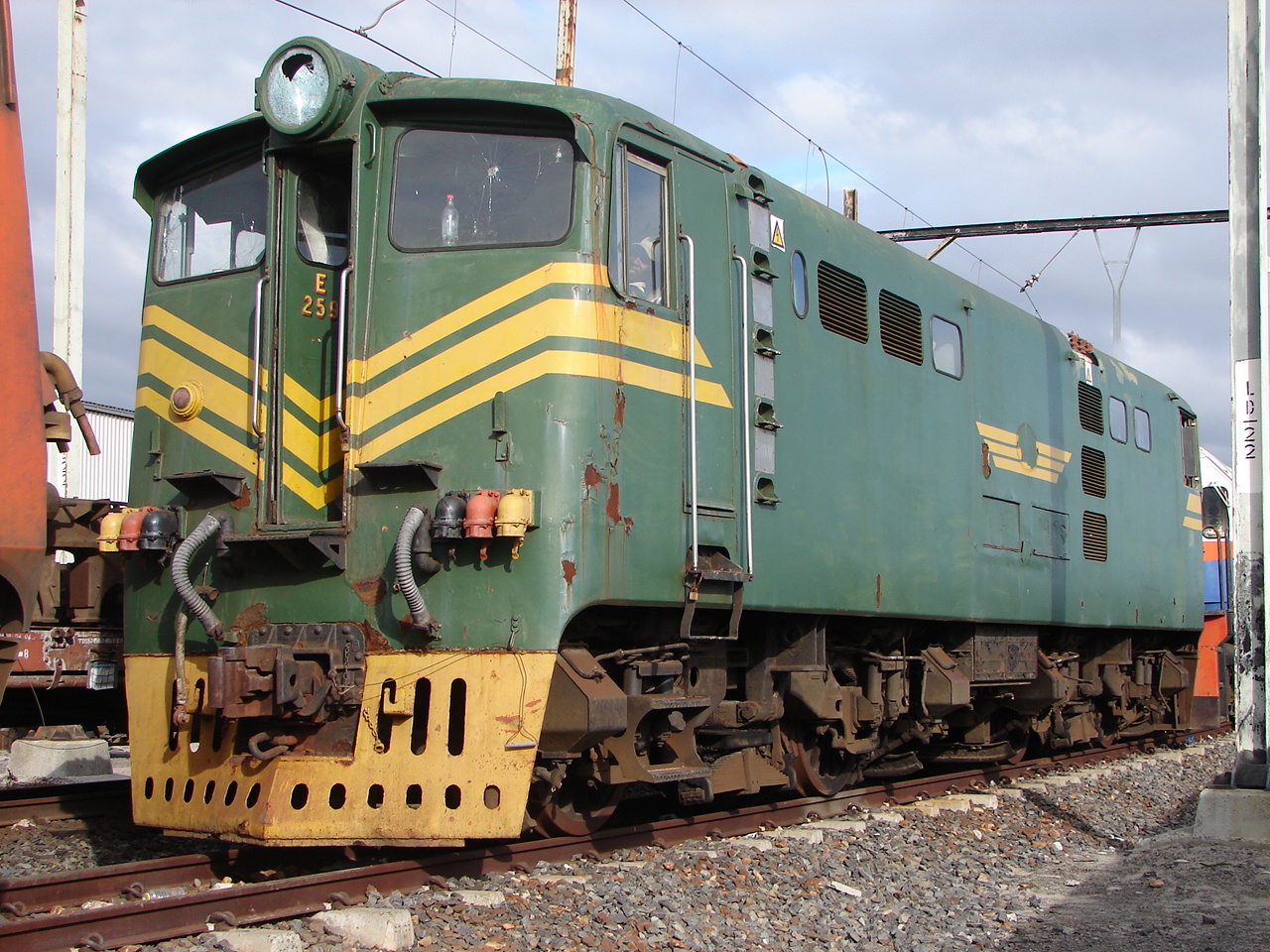
- Class leader no. E259 at the Bellville Depot, Cape Town, 24 May 2009
Type and origin
- Power type: Electric
- Designer: English Electric
- Builder: English Electric; Vulcan Foundry
- Serial number: EE 2163-2222; VF E137-E148
- Model: EE 5E
- Build date: 1954-1955
- Total produced: 60
Specifications
- Configuration
  - AAR: B-B
  - UIC: Bo'Bo'
  - Commonwealth: Bo-Bo
- Gauge: 3 ft 6 in (1,067 mm) Cape gauge
- Wheel diameter: 1,219 mm (48.0 in)
- Wheelbase: 11,279 mm (37 ft 1/16 in)
  - Bogie: 3,430 mm (11 ft 3 1/16 in)
- Pivot centres: 7,849 mm (25 ft 9 in)
- Panto shoes: 6,972 mm (22 ft 10 1/2 in)
- Length
  - Over couplers: 15,494 mm (50 ft 10 in)
  - Over body: 14,631 mm (48 ft 0 in)
- Width: 2,896 mm (9 ft 6 in)
- Height
  - Pantograph: 4,089 mm (13 ft 5 in)
  - Body height: 3,937 mm (12 ft 11 in)
- Axle load: 21,591 kg (47,600 lb)
- Adhesive weight: 86,364 kg (190,400 lb)
- Loco weight: 86,364 kg (190,400 lb)
- Electric system/s: 3 kV DC catenary
- Current pickup: Pantographs
- Traction motors: Four EE 529
  - Rating 1 hour: 377 kW (506 hp)
  - Continuous: 325 kW (436 hp)
- Gear ratio: 18:67
- Loco brake: Air & Regenerative
- Train brakes: Vacuum
- Couplers: AAR knuckle
Performance figures
- Maximum speed: 97 km/h (60 mph)
- Power output
  - 1 hour: 1,508 kW (2,022 hp)
  - Continuous: 1,300 kW (1,700 hp)
- Tractive effort
  - Starting: 200 kN (45,000 lbf)
  - 1 hour: 128 kN (29,000 lbf)
  - Continuous: 104 kN (23,000 lbf)
Career
- Operators: South African Railways; Spoornet; Impala Platinum; Driefontein
- Class: Class 5E
- Number in class: 60
- Numbers: E259-E318
- Nicknames: Klein Mamba (Little Mamba)
- Delivered: 1955-1956
- First run: 1955

The South African Railways Class 5E, Series 1 of 1955 was an electric locomotive.

In 1955 and 1956, the South African Railways placed sixty Class 5E, Series 1 electric locomotives with a Bo-Bo wheel arrangement in mainline service. The Class 5E introduced what eventually became the most prolific locomotive body shape to ever run on South African rails.

== Manufacturers ==
To cope with increased traffic loads on the South African Railways (SAR) in the 1950s, the capacity of its 3 kV DC electrified lines had to be increased. Since more sections in Natal and Transvaal were being electrified, the SAR placed an order for the design and production of a new and more powerful Bo-Bo mainline electric locomotive with English Electric (EE) in 1952. Sixty Class 5E, Series 1 locomotives were delivered and placed in service in 1955 and 1956, numbered in the range from E259 to E318.

The first 48 units, numbered in the range from E259 to E306, were built at the Dick Kerr works of EE in Preston in 1954 and 1955, while the construction of the last twelve, numbered in the range from E307 to E318, was subcontracted to Vulcan Foundry. These twelve, with EE works numbers in the range from 2211 to 2222, were therefore also allocated Vulcan works numbers in the range from E137 to E148.

They were delivered in a bottle green livery with red cowcatchers, initially without the yellow lines and whiskers which were added later to improve their visibility. Since the long Class 4E was already nicknamed Groen Mamba (Green Mamba) by Cape Western enginemen, the shorter Class 5E promptly became the Klein Mamba (Little Mamba) when they first appeared on that section, while the Class 4E was "promoted" to Groot Mamba (Large Mamba). Beginning in 1960, a Gulf Red and yellow whiskers livery gradually replaced the green and yellow.

With both the bottle green and later the Gulf Red SAR liveries, the units had red cowcatchers, except in the Cape Western region. Locomotives based at the Bellville Depot could be identified by their yellow cowcatchers.

== Orientation ==
These dual cab locomotives had a roof access ladder on one side only, just to the right of the cab access door. The roof access ladder end was marked as the no. 2 end. A corridor along the centre of the locomotive connected the cabs, which were identical except that cab 2 was where the handbrake was located.

== Brakes ==
While the locomotive itself used air brakes, it was only equipped to operate trains with vacuum brakes. While hauling a train, the locomotive's air brake system would be made subordinate to the train's vacuum brake system and would come into operation as the vacuum brakes were being applied, gradually building up to its maximum of 350 kilopascals (51 pounds per square inch). While working a train downgrade, the locomotive's regenerative braking system would also work in conjunction with the train's vacuum brakes.

The locomotive's air brakes would usually only be used along with the train brakes during emergencies. Under normal circumstances the train would be controlled by using the train brakes alone to slow down and stop.

While the locomotive was stopped, the air brakes on each bogie could be applied independently. The handbrake or parking brake, located in cab 2, only operated on the unit's last axle, the no. 7 and 8 wheels.

== Class 5E series ==
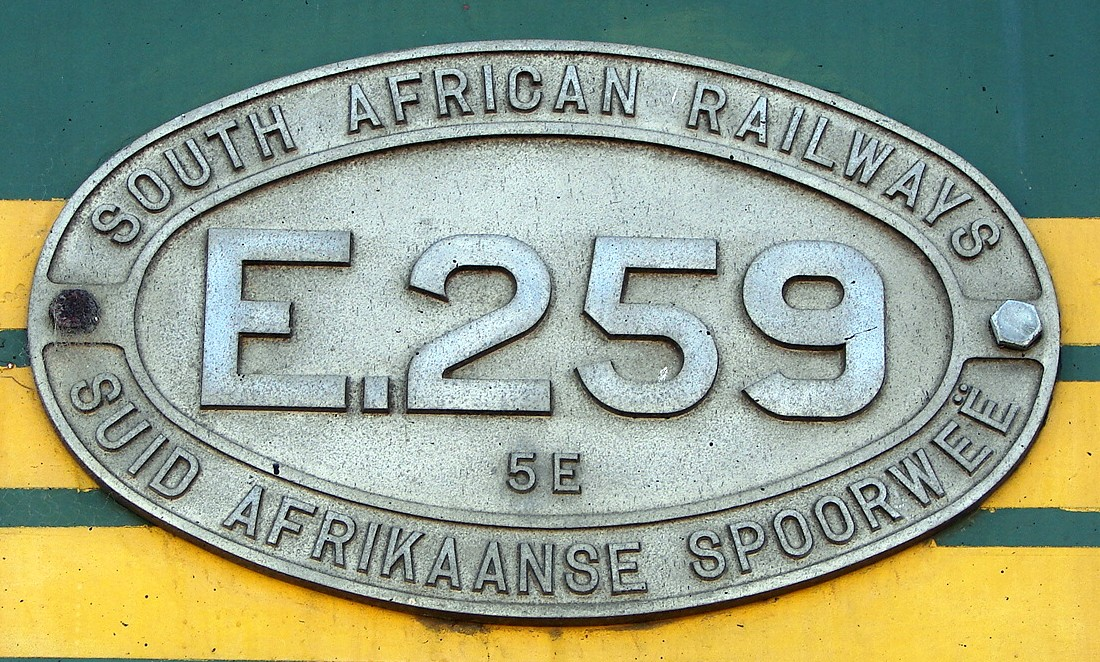
Builder's plate

The Class 5E was produced in three series, the EE- and Vulcan-built Series 1 and the Vulcan-built Series 2 and Series 3. Between 1955 and 1959, altogether 160 Class 5E locomotives were placed in service, 60 Series 1, 45 Series 2 and 55 Series 3.

The traditional number plates on the sides of SAR locomotives were usually in a perfect oval shape and were usually cast in a leaded bronze. On the Class 5E, Series 1, however, the plates were in an oval shape with blunted ends and were cast in aluminium.

== Legacy ==
The Class 5E introduced what eventually became the most prolific locomotive body shape to ever run on South African rails, serving on all the 3 kV DC lines country-wide. The body shape and dimensions were continued with the Class 5E1 in 1959, the Class 6E and the Class 6E1 from 1969 to 1985, and still later with the rebuilding of Class 6E1 locomotives to Class 18E, a project which began in 2000.

== Service ==
The Class 5E entered service on the Natal mainline between Durban and Johannesburg and eventually served almost country-wide as electrification was completed on more mainlines. In 1960, sixty units of the Class 5E family were allocated to the Witbank section upon completion of its electrification. In December 1961 twelve of them were replaced by Class 32-000 diesel-electric locomotives and transferred to the newly-electrified Touws River-Beaufort West section. More followed to replace the Class 25 condensers that were being transferred from that section to Beaconsfield in Kimberley. At the time, electric locomotives were urgently needed on the Touwsrivier–Beaufort West section, most likely because of the water issues in the Karoo and the redeployment of the Class 25 condensing steam locomotives to the Northern Cape.

After withdrawal from service, six Class 5E, Series 1 locomotives were sold into industrial service.

- Five, numbers E269, E274, E284, E289 and E318, were sold to the Impala platinum mine in Rustenburg.
- No. E290 was sold to the Driefontein gold mine near Carletonville.

== Preservation ==
Currently only two have been preserved so far in preservation of the Class 5E Series 1 variants.

- Class 5E E259 the class leader is preserved at Bloemfontein Loco Depot with intentions for it to be a museum as this loco is the first sub-leader of the Class 5E Series 1's and is marked as a historic locomotive.
- Class 5E E293 Incorrectly numbered E262 is preserved at Bellville Loco Depot.

== Works numbers ==
The EE and Vulcan works numbers of the Class 5E, Series 1 and their known disposal are shown in the table.

Class 5E, Series 1
Loco no.	EE works no.	Vulcan works no.	Sold to
E259	2163		Preserved
E260	2164		
E261	2165		
E262	2166		
E263	2167		
E264	2168		
E265	2169		
E266	2170		
E267	2171		
E268	2172		
E269	2173		Impala
E270	2174		
E271	2175		
E272	2176		
E273	2177		
E274	2178		Impala
E275	2179		
E276	2180		
E277	2181		
E278	2182		
E279	2183		
E280	2184		
E281	2185		
E282	2186		
E283	2187		
E284	2188		Impala
E285	2189		
E286	2190		
E287	2191		
E288	2192		
E289	2193		Impala
E290	2194		Dries
E291	2195		
E292	2196		
E293	2197		Preserved (incorrectly numbered E262)
E294	2198		
E295	2199		
E296	2200		
E297	2201		
E298	2202		
E299	2203		
E300	2204		
E301	2205		
E302	2206		
E303	2207		
E304	2208		
E305	2209		
E306	2210		
E307	2211	E137	
E308	2212	E138	
E309	2213	E139	
E310	2214	E140	
E311	2215	E141	
E312	2216	E142	
E313	2217	E143	
E314	2218	E144	
E315	2219	E145	
E316	2220	E146	
E317	2221	E147	
E318	2222	E148	Impala

== Illustration ==
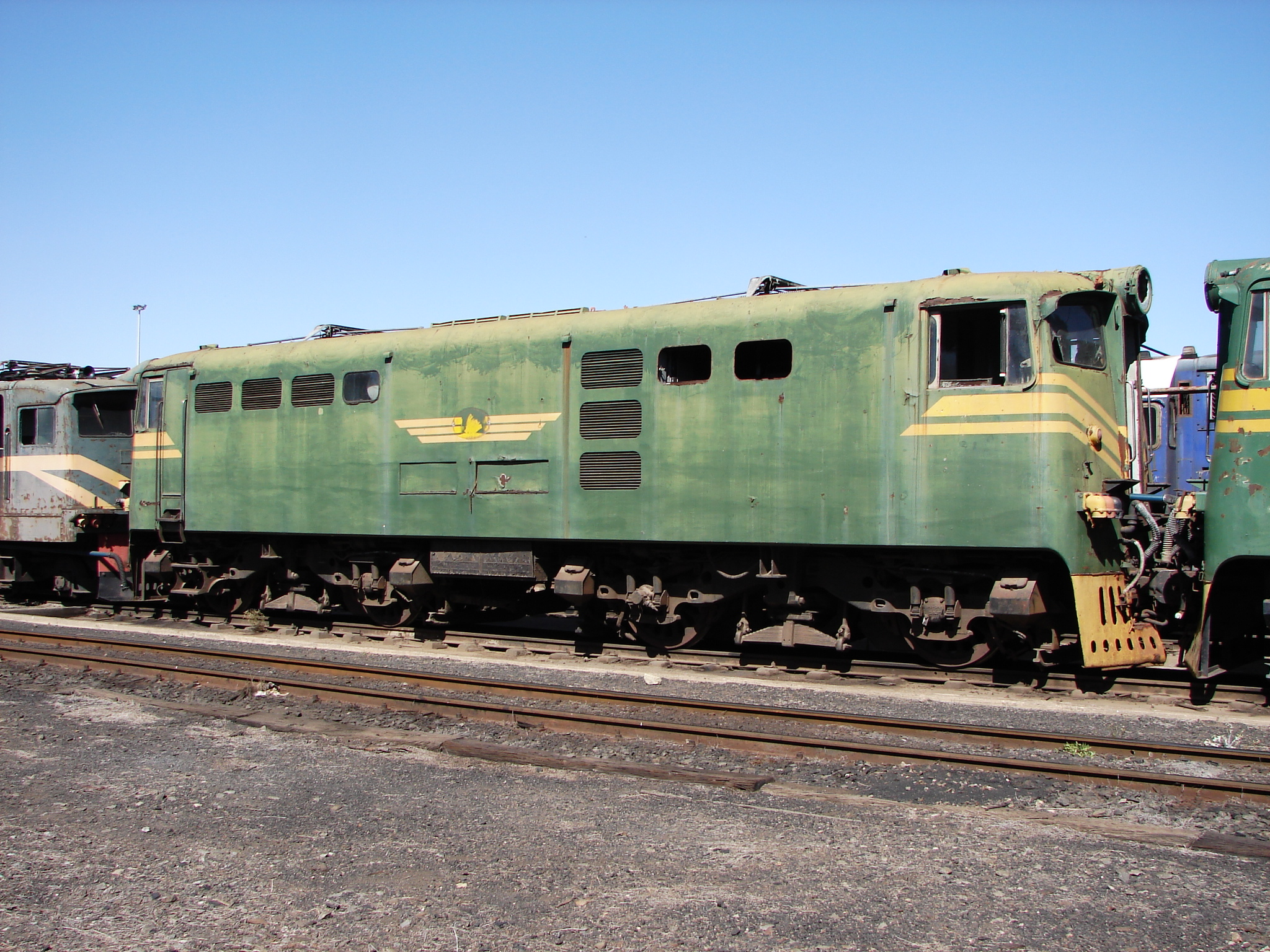
Left side of no. E259, with its no. 2 end at right, Bloemfontein, 18 September 2015

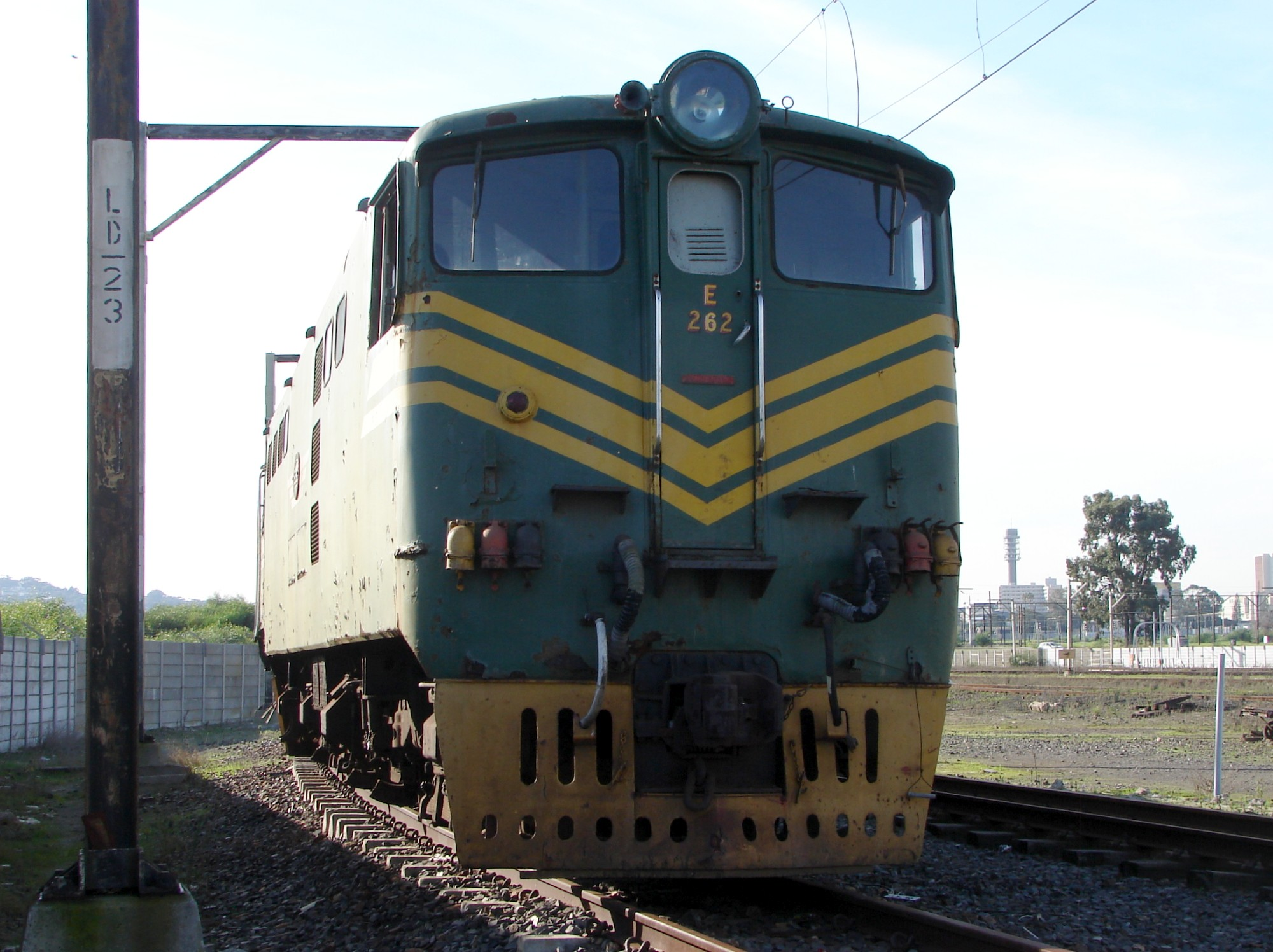
No. 2 end of no. E293, renumbered E262 in preservation, Bellville, 4 July 2017
