= 1995 African Cup of Champions Clubs Final =

1995 African Champions Cup final
- Event: 1995 African Cup of Champions Clubs
Orlando Pirates	ASEC Mimosas
(South Africa)	(Ivory Coast)
3	2

First leg
Orlando Pirates	ASEC Mimosas
2	2
- Date: 2 December 1995
- Venue: FNB Stadium, Johannesburg
- Referee: Omer Yengo (Congo)

Second leg
ASEC Mimosas	Orlando Pirates
0	1
- Date: 16 December 1995
- Venue: Felix Houphouet Boigny Stadium, Abidjan
- Referee: Said Belqola (Morocco)

The 1995 African Cup of Champions Clubs final was the decisive tie of the 31st edition of Africa's premier club football tournament, determining the continent's champion for the season. The final was contested over two legs between Orlando Pirates of South Africa and ASEC Mimosas of Côte d'Ivoire. Orlando Pirates won the title 3–2 on aggregate, becoming the first South African club to win the African Cup of Champions Clubs, a landmark achievement occurring just 3 years after South Africa's return to international football.

The first leg, played in Johannesburg on 2 December 1995, ended in a 2–2 draw, leaving the contest finely balanced heading into the return fixture. The second leg, held at the Stade Félix Houphouët‑Boigny in Abidjan on 16 December 1995, saw Orlando Pirates secure a dramatic 1–0 away victory thanks to a late goal by Jerry Sikhosana, sealing the aggregate win and the championship.

The triumph was later recognized for its significance and drama, with the second leg being awarded Kick Off Magazine’s “Game of the Decade”.

== Venues ==
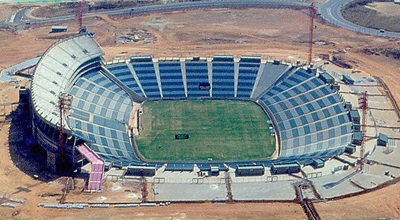
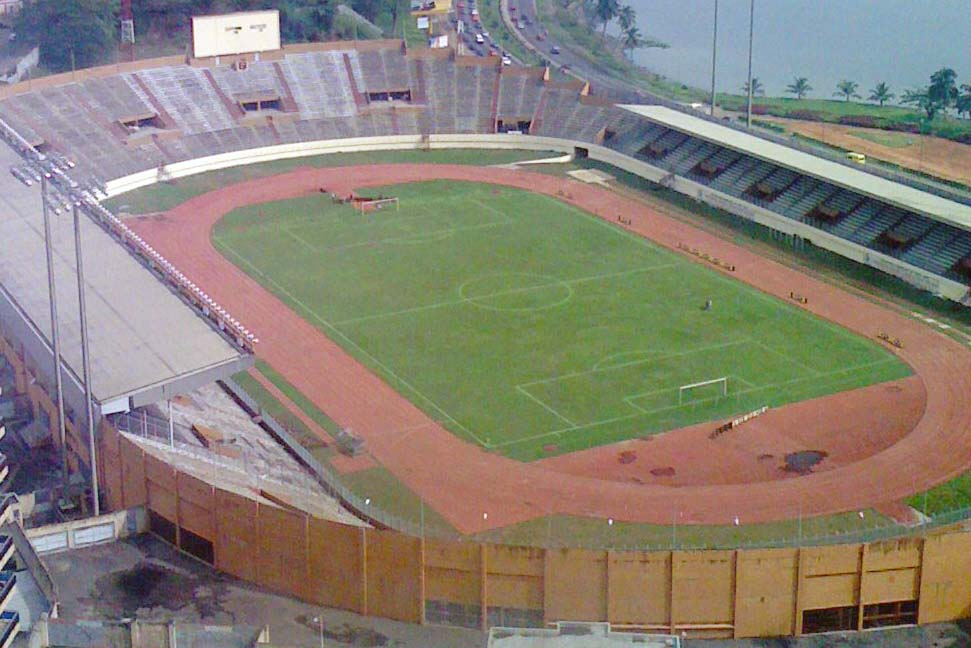
The old FNB Stadium (left) and the old Félix Houphouët-Boigny Stadium, venues for the series

== Route to the final ==
Orlando Pirates				Round	ASEC Mimosas			
Opponent	Agg.	1st leg	2nd leg		Opponent	Agg.	1st leg	2nd leg
(Eswatini) Eleven Men in Flight	5–0	3–0 (A)	2–0 (H)	First round	(Angola) Petro Atlético	5–2	2–1 (A)	3–1 (H)
(Nigeria) BCC Lions	2–1	1–1 (A)	1–0 (H)	Second round	(Tanzania) Simba SC	4–2	2–1 (H)	2–1 (A)
(Gabon) Mbilinga FC	4–2	1–2 (A)	3–0 (H)	Quarter-finals	(Ghana) Obuasi Goldfields	2–0	2–0 (A)	0–0 (H)
(Uganda) Express FC	2–1	1-0 (H)	1–1 (A)	Semi-finals	(Egypt) Ismaily	5–2	0–1 (A)	5–1 (H)

== First leg ==
=== Pre-match ===
Orlando Pirates entered the final as surprise contenders. Their domestic form had been modest, and the club had struggled with fixture congestion due to the National Soccer League’s scheduling issues, playing four matches in eleven days shortly before the final. (Note: According to the Mail & Guardian, the National Soccer League required Orlando Pirates to complete a backlog of fixtures before the league’s early shutdown for national‑team preparations for the AFCON tournament. As a result, Pirates were scheduled to play five domestic matches in a two‑week span, including a league match against Cape Town Spurs at FNB Stadium, derbies against Chiefs and Sundowns and several remaining league commitments compressed into an eleven‑day window.) Coach Joe Frickleton expressed frustration with the national football authorities and attempted, unsuccessfully, to exempt several key players from national‑team duty during the Simba Four Nations tournament. Despite this, the club’s continental campaign had gathered momentum, culminating in a dramatic last‑second goal in Uganda that secured their place in the final. Club chairman Irvin Khoza, who had revitalized the club since returning in 1990, offered significant financial incentives to the squad as they approached the final.

ASEC Mimosas arrived in Johannesburg with minimal pressure. They had already secured qualification for the next year’s Champions Cup after being awarded the Ivorian league title following Africa Sports’ disqualification. (Note: Africa Sports were initially crowned champions, but the title was revoked after it was discovered that player Bamba Ladji had falsified his identity and age. As a result, the championship was subsequently awarded to the original runners‑up, ASEC Abidjan.) The team, now coached by Mamadou Zaré, formerly Philippe Troussier’s assistant during his tenure at ASEC Mimosas, had just won the Ivorian Cup thanks to a brace from national‑team striker Abdoulaye Traoré. With a balanced squad featuring talents such as John Zaki, Lassina Dao, and Donald Sié, ASEC Mimosas were widely regarded as the more organized and experienced team.

=== Match summary ===
The match began at a frenetic pace. Orlando Pirates struck first in the 5th minute, when winger Helman Mkhalele finished a swift attacking move on the left side to give the hosts a 1–0 lead. ASEC responded with composure. Their organized midfield began to dictate play, and in the 18th minute, Nigerian forward John Zaki capitalized on a poorly executed back‑pass from defender Tsotetsi, leveling the score at 1–1. ASEC continued to press and were rewarded in the 31st minute, when Donald Sié headed home from a corner to give the Ivorians a deserved 2–1 advantage. Pirates equalized in the 42nd minute through their centre-back, Gavin Lane, whose header from a Mkhalele cross restored parity and reignited the home crowd.

The second half was marked by tension and physicality. Orlando Pirates pushed forward aggressively but struggled to break down ASEC’s disciplined defensive structure. Their task became harder when captain Innocent Mncwango was sent off for kicking Zaki while he was on the ground. Reduced to ten men, Pirates relied on frantic pressing but created few clear chances. The match ended 2–2, a result that left ASEC satisfied and Pirates frustrated, especially after crowd trouble erupted when home supporters attacked a small group of Ivorian fans, who had to seek refuge on the pitch.

=== Match details ===
1995 African Champions Cup final
2 December 1995
First leg

Orlando Pirates (South Africa)	2–2 (Note: The starting lineups for this match are taken from France Football (Paris), no. 2591.)	(Ivory Coast) ASEC Mimosas
Mkhalele 5'; Lane 42'		Zaki 18'; Sié 31'

FNB Stadium, Johannesburg
Attendance: 35.000
Referee: Omer Yengo (Congo)

GK	1	(Nigeria) Williams Okpara
DF		(South Africa) Edward Motale
DF	5	(South Africa) Gavin Lane
DF	6	(South Africa) Mark Fish
DF		(South Africa) Phiri Tsotetsi
MF		(South Africa) Innocent Mncwango (c)	(red card) 34'
MF		(South Africa) John Moeti	(substituted off) 82'
MF	10	(South Africa) Brandon Silent
FW	11	(South Africa) Helman Mkhalele
FW	7	(South Africa) Marc Batchelor	(substituted off) 87'
FW		(South Africa) Jerry Sikhosana
Substitutes:
MF		(South Africa) Dumisa Ngobe	(substituted on) 82'
FW		(South Africa) Bruce Ramokadi	(substituted on) 87'
Manager:
(Scotland) Joe Frickleton

GK	1	(Ivory Coast) Seydou Diarra
DF		(Republic of the Congo) Florent Baloki
DF		(Ivory Coast) Ghislain Akassou
DF	2	(Ivory Coast) Basile Aka Kouamé (c)
DF		(Ivory Coast) Lassina Dao
DF		(Ivory Coast) Mamadou Traoré
MF		(Ivory Coast) Tchiressoua Guel
MF		(Ivory Coast) Aliou Siby Badra
MF		(Ivory Coast) Donald-Olivier Sié	(yellow card) 73' (substituted off) 81'
FW	10	(Ivory Coast) Abdoulaye Traoré	(yellow card) 63' (substituted off) 71'
FW		(Nigeria) John Zaki
Substitutes:
FW		(Ivory Coast) Sékou Bamba	(substituted on) 71'
MF		(Nigeria) Akeem Ogunlade	(substituted on) 81'
Manager:
(Ivory Coast) Mamadou Zaré

== Second Leg ==
=== Pre-match ===
In the week leading up to the second leg, Orlando Pirates were thrown into turmoil. Their manager Joe Frickleton was abruptly dismissed after publicly criticizing the club’s internal disorganization, including transportation issues and the lack of a youth development structure. Club president Irvin Khoza reacted strongly, insisting the team would not miss the Scottish coach, though even the club’s own public relations officer expressed surprise at the decision. Assistant coach, Zambian Ronald Mkhandawire was appointed to lead the team for the decisive match.

ASEC Mimosas, meanwhile, entered the second leg amid enormous national expectation. The club had prepared extensively, drawing lessons from three semifinal eliminations over the previous fifteen years and from the tragic events of 1993, when Ivorian and Ghanaian clubs were suspended from African competitions following deadly crowd violence. (Note: The 31 October 1993 ASEC–Asante Kotoko semifinal in Kumasi, won 2–0 by the Ghanaian side, sparked severe violence against traveling supporters in both countries, resulting in multiple deaths and widespread reprisals; the incident led to both Ivorian and Ghanaian clubs being excluded from African competitions for the 1994 season.) With a squad featuring stars such as John Zaki, Abdoulaye “Ben Badi” Traoré, Sékou Bamba, and Congolese defender Baloki, ASEC were widely considered favorites to lift the trophy on home soil. In Abidjan, anticipation reached fever pitch. Supporters gathered in Treichville’s Labor Exchange, where ASEC president Roger Ouégnin encouraged fans to prepare celebrations worthy of a long‑awaited continental triumph. The club had not reached a final since the early years of the competition, and the nation’s political leadership, including President Henri Konan Bédié, was fully invested in the occasion.

Despite the Pirates’ chaotic preparation - including a stolen team vehicle, disrupted training sessions, and the dismissal of their coach - the South Africans arrived in Abidjan determined to withstand the pressure. They rejected the hotel arranged by ASEC, trained at match time to acclimatize to the conditions, and drew confidence from the national team’s recent 0–0 result against Germany.

=== Match summary ===
The second leg unfolded in a tense, humid atmosphere, with a stacked Felix Houphouet Boigny stadium overwhelmingly behind ASEC. The home side dominated early possession, forcing Orlando Pirates to defend deep. Nigerian goalkeeper Williams Okpara delivered a standout performance, repeatedly denying ASEC’s attackers during a first half played largely in the Pirates’ defensive third. ASEC’s attacking trio - Zaki, Bamba, and Traoré - created several dangerous situations, while the South Africans relied on rapid counterattacks led by Jerry Sikhosana and Helman Mkhalele. Despite the pressure, Pirates remained composed, absorbing ASEC’s advances and waiting for opportunities to break forward.

In the second half, the momentum gradually shifted. Pirates began to exploit spaces left by ASEC’s increasingly aggressive forward play. ASEC goalkeeper Diarra was forced into several risky clearances as the visitors grew in confidence.

In the 73rd minute, the match turned. Mark Fish launched a clearance from deep and a collision between ASEC defenders Aka and Akassou left the ball loose on the left flank. Jerry “Legs of Thunder” Sikhosana pounced, drove into the box, and finished past the advancing Diarra to give Orlando Pirates a stunning 1–0 lead. ASEC pushed desperately for an equalizer, and came closest in the 82nd minute, when Lassina Dao’s header struck the post. But the South Africans held firm, defending with discipline and resilience until the final whistle.

=== Match details ===
16 December 1995
Second leg

ASEC Mimosas (Ivory Coast)	0–1 (Note: The starting lineups for this leg are taken from France Football (Paris), no. 2593.)	(South Africa) Orlando Pirates
		Sikhosana 73'

Felix Houphouet Boigny Stadium, Abidjan
Attendance: 50.000
Referee: Said Belqola (Morocco)

GK	1	(Ivory Coast) Seydou Diarra
DF	2	(Ivory Coast) Basile Aka Kouamé (c)
DF		(Ivory Coast) Lassina Dao
DF		(Ivory Coast) Ghislain Akassou
DF		(Ivory Coast) Mamadou Traoré
MF		(Ivory Coast) Tchiressoua Guel
MF		(Ivory Coast) Aliou Siby Badra
MF		(Ivory Coast) Serge Maguy	(substituted off) 77'
MF		(Ivory Coast) Donald-Olivier Sié
FW	10	(Ivory Coast) Abdoulaye Traoré
FW		(Nigeria) John Zaki	(substituted off) 61'
Substitutes:
FW		(Ivory Coast) Sékou Bamba	(substituted on) 61'
FW		(Ivory Coast) Noel Kipre	(substituted on) 77'
Manager:
(Ivory Coast) Mamadou Zaré

GK	1	(Nigeria) Williams Okpara
DF		(South Africa) Edward Motale (c)
DF	5	(South Africa) Gavin Lane
DF	6	(South Africa) Mark Fish
DF		(South Africa) Phiri Tsotetsi
MF		(South Africa) Vincent Sokhela	(substituted off) 78'
MF		(South Africa) John Moeti
MF	10	(South Africa) Brandon Silent
MF		(South Africa) Bruce Ramokadi	(substituted off) 48'
FW		(South Africa) Jerry Sikhosana	(yellow card) 56'
FW	11	(South Africa) Helman Mkhalele
Substitutes:
FW	7	(South Africa) Marc Batchelor	(substituted on) 48'
MF		(South Africa) Bernard Lushozi	(substituted on) 78'
Manager:
(Zambia) Ronald Mkandawire

== Post-match ==
The final whistle triggered scenes of both triumph and heartbreak. Orlando Pirates became the first South African club to win the African Cup of Champions Clubs, achieving the feat in their debut appearance in the competition. Players and staff celebrated on the pitch, with defender Mark Fish reportedly asking in disbelief whether any club had ever won the title on its first attempt.

For ASEC, the defeat was devastating. Supporters wept in the stands, and some frustrated fans set small fires in the stadium’s empty sections as CAF president Issa Hayatou presented the trophy to the Pirates. President Roger Ouégnin attempted to console the fanbase, urging them to “manage our pain and forget this dark day,” while acknowledging that the loss marked the end of an era for the club.

Despite the victory, Orlando Pirates faced disciplinary consequences. CAF issued the club a “very severe warning” and a $5,000 fine for the crowd violence that occurred during the first leg in Johannesburg. The South African Football Association was also criticized for inadequate security, and Pirates were barred from using FNB Stadium in the following year’s competition.

The triumph propelled the Pirates into the 1996 African Super Cup, where they were scheduled to face JS Kabylie of Algeria. The victory also symbolized South Africa’s rapid rise in continental football, coming just weeks before the country hosted the 1996 Africa Cup of Nations.

== See also ==
- CAF Champions League
- 1995 African Cup of Champions Clubs
