= 2000 Africa Cup of Nations Group A =

Group A of the 2000 African Cup of Nations ran from 22 January until 31 January. It consisted of Ghana, Cameroon, Ivory Coast and Togo. The matches were held in Accra and Kumasi in Ghana. Cameroon and Ghana progressed to the quarterfinals.

== Standings ==
Pos	Team	Pld	W	D	L	GF	GA	GD	Pts	Qualification
1	Cameroon	3	1	1	1	4	2	+2	4	Advance to knockout stage
2	Ghana (H)	3	1	1	1	3	3	0	4	Advance to knockout stage
3	Ivory Coast	3	1	1	1	3	4	−1	4	
4	Togo	3	1	1	1	2	3	−1	4	

Source: CAF
(H) Hosts

== Ghana vs. Cameroon ==
22 January 2000

Ghana	1–1	Cameroon
Ayew 57'		Foé 20'

Accra Sports Stadium, Accra
Attendance: 45,000
Referee: Ali Bujsaim (United Arab Emirates)

GK	Richard Kingson
DF	Samuel Kuffour
DF	Mohammed Gargo	(substituted off) 55'
DF	Alex Nyarko
DF	Christian Gyan
MF	Stephen Baidoo
MF	Augustine Ahinful	(substituted off) 31'
MF	Charles Akonnor
MF	Samuel Johnson
FW	Kwame Ayew
FW	Otto Addo	(substituted off) 67'
Substitutions:
FW	Peter Ofori-Quaye	(substituted on) 31'
MF	Mark Edusei	(substituted on) 55'
MF	Stephen Appiah	(substituted on) 67'
Manager:
(Italy) Giuseppe Dossena

GK	Alioum Boukar
DF	Lauren
DF	Rigobert Song
DF	Raymond Kalla
DF	Pierre Womé
DF	Pierre Njanka
MF	Geremi
MF	Marc-Vivien Foé
MF	Salomon Olembé	(substituted off) 81'
FW	Joseph-Désiré Job	(substituted off) 64'
FW	Patrick M'Boma	(substituted off) 80'
Substitutions:
MF	Pius N'Diefi	(substituted on) 64'
FW	Samuel Eto'o	(substituted on) 80'
DF	Lucien Mettomo	(substituted on) 81'
Manager:
(France) Pierre Lechantre

== Ivory Coast vs. Togo ==
24 January 2000

Ivory Coast	1–1	Togo
Guel 38' (pen.)		Ouadja 62'

Accra Sports Stadium, Accra
Attendance: 13,000
Referee: Tessema Hailemalak (Ethiopia)

GK	Alain Gouaméné
DF	Lassina Diabaté
DF	Patrice Zere
DF	Didier Angan
DF	Cyril Domoraud
MF	Serge Dié
MF	Ibrahima Koné
MF	Tchiressoua Guel
MF	Donald-Olivier Sie	(substituted off) 73'
FW	Bonaventure Kalou	(substituted off) 84'
FW	Ibrahima Bakayoko	(substituted off) 76'
Substitutions:
MF	Aliou Siby Badra	(substituted on) 73'
FW	Hamed Modibo Diallo	(substituted on) 76'
FW	Charles Dago	(substituted on) 84'
Manager:
Gbonka Tia Martin

GK	Kossi Agassa	(yellow card) 37'
DF	Messan Ametokodo		(substituted off) 46'
DF	Massamasso Tchangai
DF	Yaovi Abalo
DF	Yao Senaya
DF	Tadjou Salou
MF	Yao Aziawonou		(substituted off) 36'
MF	Lantame Ouadja
MF	Mamam Cherif Touré
MF	Mohamed Coubageat
FW	Koffi Fiawoo		(substituted off) 46'
Substitutions:
MF	Komlan Assignon		(substituted on) 36'
FW	Djima Oyawolé		(substituted on) 46'
DF	Franck Atsou		(substituted on) 46'
Manager:
(Germany) Gottlieb Goeller

== Ghana vs. Togo ==
27 January 2000

Ghana	2–0	Togo
Ayew 28'; Addo 37'

Accra Sports Stadium, Accra
Attendance: 30,000
Referee: Abderrahim Al-Arjoune (Morocco)

GK	Richard Kingson
DF	Samuel Kuffour
DF	Eben Dugbatey	(yellow card) 21' (red card) 64'
DF	Alex Nyarko	(yellow card) 41'
DF	Christian Gyan		(substituted off) 81'
MF	Mark Edusei
MF	Charles Akonnor
MF	Samuel Johnson
FW	Kwame Ayew
FW	Yaw Preko		(substituted off) 69'
FW	Otto Addo		(substituted off) 88'
Substitutions:
MF	Emmanuel Kuffour		(substituted on) 69'
MF	Stephen Baidoo		(substituted on) 81'
MF	Daniel Addo		(substituted on) 88'
Manager:
(Italy) Giuseppe Dossena

GK	Kossi Agassa
DF	Tadjou Salou
DF	Massamasso Tchangai
DF	Yaovi Abalo	Booked
DF	Yao Senaya	(yellow card) 21'
DF	Franck Atsou		(substituted off) 84'
MF	Komlan Assignon	(yellow card) 29'
MF	Lantame Ouadja
MF	Mamam Cherif Touré
FW	Djima Oyawolé
FW	Koffi Fiawoo		(substituted off) 48'
Substitutions:
MF	Djima Oyawolé		(substituted on) 48'
FW	Franck Dote		(substituted on) 84'
Manager:
(Germany) Gottlieb Goeller

== Cameroon vs. Ivory Coast ==
28 January 2000

Cameroon	3–0	Ivory Coast
Kalla 29'; Eto'o 45'; M'Boma 90'

Accra Sports Stadium, Accra
Attendance: 5,000
Referee: Mourad Daami (Tunisia)

GK	Alioum Boukar
DF	Lauren
DF	Rigobert Song
DF	Raymond Kalla
DF	Pierre Womé
DF	Pierre Njanka
MF	Geremi	(substituted off) 65'
MF	Marc-Vivien Foé
MF	Salomon Olembé	(substituted off) 59'
FW	Samuel Eto'o	(substituted off) 46'
FW	Patrick M'Boma
Substitutions:
MF	Pius N'Diefi	(substituted on) 46'
DF	Innocent Hamga	(substituted on) 59'
MF	Joseph N'Do	(substituted on) 65'
Manager:
(France) Pierre Lechantre

GK	Alain Gouaméné
DF	Lassina Diabaté	(substituted off) 73'
DF	Dominique Sam Abouo
DF	Cyril Domoraud
DF	Olivier Tébily
MF	Lassina Dao	(substituted off) 46'
MF	Aliou Siby Badra
MF	Tchiressoua Guel
MF	Donald-Olivier Sie
FW	Ibrahima Bakayoko
FW	Charles Dago	(substituted off) 62'
Substitutions:
MF	Ibrahima Koné	(substituted on) 46'
FW	Bonaventure Kalou	(substituted on) 62'
FW	Serge Dié	(substituted on) 73'
Manager:
Gbonka Tia Martin

== Ghana vs. Ivory Coast ==
31 January 2000

Ghana	0–2	Ivory Coast
		Kalou 45'; Sie 84'

Accra Sports Stadium, Accra
Attendance: 40,000

GK	Richard Kingson
DF	Samuel Kuffour
DF	Emmanuel Kuffour	(substituted off) 61'
DF	Alex Nyarko
MF	Stephen Baidoo
MF	Mark Edusei
MF	Charles Akonnor
MF	Samuel Johnson
FW	Kwame Ayew
FW	Augustine Ahinful	(substituted off) 60'
FW	Otto Addo	(substituted off) 78'
Substitutions:
FW	Peter Ofori-Quaye	(substituted on) 60'
DF	Mohammed Gargo	(substituted on) 61'
FW	Yaw Preko	(substituted on) 78'
Manager:
(Italy) Giuseppe Dossena

GK	Alain Gouaméné
DF	Ghislain Akassou
DF	Dominique Sam Abouo
DF	Olivier Tébily
MF	Serge Dié
MF	Aliou Siby Badra
MF	Tchiressoua Guel
MF	Ibrahima Koné	(substituted off) 90'
FW	Zephirin Zoko	(substituted off) 67'
FW	Bonaventure Kalou
FW	Hamed Modibo Diallo	(substituted off) 72'
Substitutions:
MF	Donald-Olivier Sie	(substituted on) 67'
FW	Ibrahima Bakayoko	(substituted on) 72'
FW	Blaise Kouassi	(substituted on) 90'
Manager:
Gbonka Tia Martin

== Cameroon vs. Togo ==
31 January 2000

Cameroon	0–1	Togo
		Tchangai 19'

Kumasi Sports Stadium, Kumasi
Attendance: 2,000
Referee: Olaniyan Olufunmi (Nigeria)

GK	Alioum Boukar
DF	Lauren
DF	Rigobert Song
DF	Lucien Mettomo
DF	Innocent Hamga	(substituted off) 62'
DF	Pierre Njanka
MF	Geremi
MF	Marc-Vivien Foé
MF	Marcel Mahouvé
FW	Joseph-Désiré Job	(substituted off) 46'
FW	Patrick M'Boma
Substitutions:
FW	Bernard Tchoutang	(substituted on) 46'
MF	Salomon Olembé	(substituted on) 62'
Manager:
(France) Pierre Lechantre

GK	Kossi Agassa
DF	Tadjou Salou
DF	Massamasso Tchangai
DF	Yaovi Abalo
DF	Yao Senaya
MF	Yao Aziawonou
MF	Komlan Assignon
MF	Lantame Ouadja
MF	Mamam Cherif Touré
FW	Djima Oyawolé
FW	Mohamed Coubageat
Substitutions:
Manager:
(Germany) Gottlieb Goeller
