= List of foreign Ligue 1 players: T =

This is a list of foreign players in the French Ligue 1, which commenced play in 1932. The following players must meet both of the following two criteria:

1. Have played at least one Ligue 1 game. Players who were signed by Ligue 1 clubs, but only played in lower league, cup and/or European games, or did not play in any competitive games at all, are not included.
2. Are considered foreign, i.e., outside France and its dependencies (Guadeloupe, Martinique, Reunion Island or French Polynesia), determined by the following:

A player is considered foreign if he is not eligible to play for the national teams of France.

More specifically,

- If a player has been capped on international level, the national team is used; if he has been capped by more than one country, the highest level (or the most recent) team is used. These include French players with dual citizenship. Players who played for France but came as foreign players (such as Miguel Ángel Lauri) are also listed.
- If a player has not been capped on international level, his country of birth is used, except those who were born abroad from French parents or moved to France at a young age, and those who clearly indicated to have switched his nationality to another nation.

Clubs listed are those that the player has played at least one Ligue 1 game for.

Seasons listed are those that the player has played at least one Ligue 1 game in. Note that seasons, not calendar years, are used. For example, "1992–95" indicates that the player has played in every season from 1992–93 to 1994–95, but not necessarily every calendar year from 1992 to 1995.

In bold: players still active in Ligue 1 and their respective teams in current season.

== Tahiti ==
- Patrick Appriou – Marseille – 1987–88
- Marama Vahirua – Nantes, Nice, Lorient, AS Nancy – 1999–2011

== Tanzania ==
- **Mbwana Samatta** – **Le Havre** – 2025–

== Thailand ==
- Erawan Garnier – Lens – 2025–26

== Togo ==
- Charles Abi – Saint-Étienne – 2018–22
- Emmanuel Adebayor – Metz, Monaco – 2001–02, 2003–05
- Kossi Agassa – Metz, Reims – 2003–06, 2012–16
- Kuami Agboh – Auxerre – 1998–2003
- Komlan Assignon – Cannes – 1996–98
- Floyd Ayité – Nancy, Bordeaux, Reims, Bastia – 2009–11, 2012–16
- Jonathan Ayité – Brest – 2011–14
- Loïc Bessilé – Bordeaux – 2020–21
- Razak Boukari – Lens, Rennes, Sochaux – 2006–12
- Kévin Denkey – Nîmes – 2019–21
- Karimou Djibrill – Monaco – 1958–65
- Matthieu Dossevi – Metz, Toulouse – 2017–20
- Othniel Dossevi – Paris SG – 1974–75
- Pierre-Antoine Dossevi – Paris SG, Tours – 1975–76, 1980–81
- Thomas Dossevi – Valenciennes, Nantes – 2006–07, 2008–09
- Franck Fiawoo – Marseille – 1966–67, 1968–69
- Koffi Fiawoo – Sochaux – 1998–99
- Serge Gakpé – Monaco, Nantes, Amiens – 2005–11, 2013–15, 2017–18
- Kwami Hodouto – Cannes – 1995–97
- Josué Homawoo – Nantes – 2019–20
- Kerim Ibrahim – RC Paris – 1962–64
- **Dermane Karim** – Lorient, **Troyes** – 2025–
- Thibault Klidjé – Bordeaux – 2021–22
- Robert Malm – Lens, Toulouse FC – 1991–93, 1998–99
- Chérif Touré Mamam – Metz – 2005–06
- Gilbert Moevi – Bordeaux – 1959–60, 1962–67
- Adékambi Olufadé – Lille, Nice – 2001–03
- Djima Oyawolé – Metz – 1996–97, 1998–99, 2000–01
- Alaixys Romao – Grenoble, Lorient, Marseille, Reims – 2008–16, 2018–20
- Prince Segbefia – Auxerre – 2010–12
- Yao Sènaya – Cannes – 1997–98
- Gilles Sunu – Lorient, Évian, Angers – 2010–18
- Abibou Tchagnao – Martigues – 1995–96
- Kader Touré – Sochaux – 2004–06
- Gilbert Wilson – Alès – 1958–59

== Trinidad and Tobago ==
- John Bostock – Toulouse FC – 2018–19

== Tunisia ==
- Aymen Abdennour – Toulouse, Monaco, Marseille – 2011–15, 2017–18
- **Ali Abdi** – **Nice** – 2024–
- Nourredine Aouiriri – Toulouse – 1984–85
- Anis Ayari – Lorient – 2006–07
- Larry Azouni – Lorient – 2013–14
- Taoufik Belghith – Monaco – 1971–72
- Saber Ben Frej – Le Mans – 2008–10
- Fahid Ben Khalfallah – Caen, Valenciennes, Bordeaux – 2008–14
- Issam Ben Khémis – Lorient – 2015–17
- Kamel Ben Mustapha – Paris SG – 1972–73
- Mokhtar Ben Nacef – Nice – 1948–51, 1953–55
- Chaouki Ben Saada – Bastia, Nice, Troyes – 2002–05, 2008–11, 2015–16, 2017–18
- Mehdi Ben Slimane – Marseille – 1996–97
- Fakhreddine Ben Youssef – Metz – 2014–15
- Syam Ben Youssef – Caen – 2015–17
- Selim Benachour – Paris SG, Troyes – 2001–04
- Yohan Benalouane – AS Saint-Étienne – 2007–11
- Ali Boumnijel – AS Nancy, Gueugnon, Bastia – 1991–92, 1995–96, 1998–2003
- Raouf Bouzaiene – Châteauroux – 1997–98
- Dylan Bronn – Metz – 2019–22
- Fabien Camus – Marseille, Troyes, Evian – 2003–04, 2012–13, 2014–16
- Adel Chedli – Saint-Étienne, Sochaux, Istres – 1994–96, 1998–99, 2001–05
- Amine Chermiti – Gazélec Ajaccio – 2015–16
- José Clayton – Bastia – 1998–2001
- Aïmen Demai – Metz – 2001–02, 2003–04
- Chaïm El Djebali – Lyon – 2023–24
- Chérif Gabsi – Marseille – 1949–50
- Ismaël Gharbi – Paris SG – 2021–23
- Haykel Guemamdia – Strasbourg – 2005–06
- Mohsen Habacha – Ajaccio – 1969–70
- Oussama Haddadi – Dijon – 2016–19
- Karim Haggui – Strasbourg – 2004–06
- Mouez Hassen – Nice – 2013–16
- Kassem Hassouna – Le Havre, Lens – 1950–58, 1959–60
- Hammadi Henia – AS Monaco – 1953–55
- Assil Jaziri – Nice – 2018–19
- Ziad Jaziri – Troyes – 2005–07
- Issam Jemâa – Lens, Caen, Auxerre, Brest – 2005–12
- Ammar Jemal – Ajaccio – 2012–13
- David Jemmali – Cannes, Bordeaux, Grenoble – 1995–2010
- Hamdi Kasraoui – Lens – 2009–11
- Brahim Kerrit – Nice – 1962–64
- Saber Khalifa – Évian, Marseille – 2011–14
- Saîf-Eddine Khaoui – Marseille, Troyes, Caen, Clermont – 2016–23
- Wahbi Khazri – Bastia, Bordeaux, Rennes, Saint-Étienne, Montpellier – 2012–16, 2017–25
- Témime Lahzami – Marseille – 1979–80
- Aïssa Laïdouni – Angers – 2015–16
- Mohamed Larbi – Gazélec Ajaccio – 2015–16
- Imed Mhedhebi – Nantes – 2005–06
- Yassin Mikari – Sochaux – 2008–13
- Mehdi Nafti – Toulouse – 1997–99, 2000–01
- Hamed Namouchi – Lorient – 2006–09
- Jibril Othman – Saint-Étienne – 2024–25
- Hocine Ragued – Paris SG – 2005–06
- Faouzi Rouissi – Caen – 1992–94
- Jamel Saihi – Montpellier, Angers – 2009–17
- Francileudo Santos – Sochaux, Toulouse – 2001–09
- Ferjani Sassi – Metz – 2014–15
- Adel Sellimi – Nantes – 1996–97
- Ellyes Skhiri – Montpellier – 2014–19
- Naïm Sliti – Lille, Dijon – 2016–19
- Bassem Srarfi – Nice – 2016–20
- Nabil Taïder – Toulouse, Lorient – 2003–07
- **Montassar Talbi** – **Lorient** – 2022–24, 2025–
- Yoann Touzghar – Lens, Troyes, Ajaccio – 2014–15, 2021–23
- Yan Valery – Angers – 2022–23
- Alaeddine Yahia – Guingamp, Saint-Étienne, Sedan, Nice, Lens, Caen – 2001–11, 2014–17
- Moataz Zemzemi – Strasbourg – 2018–20
- Ali Zitouni – Troyes – 2005–06

== Turkey ==
- Doğan Alemdar – Rennes – 2021–23
- Umut Bozok – Nîmes, Lorient – 2018–19, 2020–21
- Zeki Çelik – Lille – 2018–22
- Mevlüt Erdinç – Sochaux, Paris SG, Rennes, Saint-Étienne, Guingamp, Metz – 2005–17
- Metehan Güçlü – Paris SG – 2018–19
- Serdar Gürler – Sochaux – 2009–10
- Deniz Hümmet – Troyes – 2015–16
- Hasan Kabze – Montpellier – 2010–12
- Colin Kazim-Richards – Toulouse – 2009–10
- Lefter Küçükandonyadis – Nice – 1952–53
- **Başar Önal** – **Lille** – 2026–
- **Berke Özer** – **Lille** – 2025–
- Yusuf Sari – Marseille – 2017–18
- Atila Turan – Reims – 2013–14, 2015–16
- Bülent Üçüncü – Lorient – 1998–99
- Cengiz Ünder – Marseille – 2021–23
- Engin Verel – Lille – 1981–83
- Yusuf Yazıcı – Lille – 2019–24
- Bertuğ Yıldırım – Rennes – 2023–24, 2025–26
- Burak Yılmaz – Lille – 2020–22

== References and notes ==
=== Books ===
- Barreaud, Marc (1998). Dictionnaire des footballeurs étrangers du championnat professionnel français (1932-1997). L'Harmattan, Paris. ISBN 2-7384-6608-7.
- Tamás Dénes; Pál Peterdi; Zoltán Rochy; József Selmeci (1999). Kalandozó magyar labdarúgók. ISBN 963-85967-0-8.

=== Club pages ===
- AJ Auxerre former players
- AJ Auxerre former players
- Girondins de Bordeaux former players
- Girondins de Bordeaux former players
- Les ex-Tangos (joueurs), Stade Lavallois former players
- Olympique Lyonnais former players
- Olympique de Marseille former players
- FC Metz former players
- AS Monaco FC former players
- Ils ont porté les couleurs de la Paillade... Montpellier HSC Former players
- AS Nancy former players
- FC Nantes former players
- Paris SG former players
- Red Star Former players
- Red Star former players
- Stade de Reims former players
- Stade Rennais former players
- CO Roubaix-Tourcoing former players
- AS Saint-Étienne former players
- Sporting Toulon Var former players

=== Others ===
- stat2foot
- footballenfrance
- French Clubs' Players in European Cups 1955-1995, RSSSF
- Finnish players abroad, RSSSF
- Italian players abroad, RSSSF
- Romanians who played in foreign championships
- Swiss players in France, RSSSF
- EURO 2008 CONNECTIONS: FRANCE, Stephen Byrne Bristol Rovers official site

== Notes ==
1. Born in Brazil
2. Born in England
3. Born in France
4. Born in Sweden
5. Born in Switzerland
6. Capped for the England national under-19 football team
7. Capped for the England national under-17 football team
8. Capped for the England national under-16 football team
9. Capped for the France national under-21 football team
10. Capped for the France national under-20 football team
11. Capped for the France national under-19 football team
12. Capped for the France national under-18 football team
13. Capped for the France national under-17 football team
14. Capped for the France national under-16 football team
15. Capped for the Switzerland national under-21 football team
