= Kipré =

Kipré is both a given name and a surname. Notable people with the name include:

- Kipré Tchétché (born 16 December 1987), Ivorian footballer
- Cédric Kipré (born 1996), French footballer
- Jean-Martial Kipré (born 1984), Ivorian footballer
- Noel Kipre (born 1972), Ivorian footballer
- Pierre Kipré (born 1945), Ivorian historian
