= Senaya (disambiguation) =

Senaya may refer to:

- Christian Neo-Aramaic dialect of Senaya, spoken by Assyrians in Shanandaj, Iran
- Marvin Senaya (born 2001), Ghanaian professional football player
- Yao Junior Sènaya (born 1984), Togolese former professional football player
- Yao Mawuko Sènaya (born 1979), older brother of Yao Junior Sènaya and former professional footballer
