= Assignon =

Assignon is a surname. Notable people with the surname include:

- Komlan Assignon (born 1974), Togolese-French footballer, father of Lorenz
- Lorenz Assignon (born 2000), French footballer
