= Bassala =

Bassala is a surname. Notable people with the surname include:

- Bassala Touré (born 1976), Malian footballer
- Bassala Sambou (born 1997), English footballer
