= Florent Baloki =

Congolese footballer

Personal information
- Full name: Florent Baloki-Milandou
- Date of birth: 10 October 1971
- Place of birth: Brazzaville, Congo
- Date of death: 9 November 2007 (aged 36)
- Place of death: France
- Height: 1.80 m (5 ft 11 in)
- Position: Defender

Senior career*
Years	Team	Apps	(Gls)
–1994	Diables Noirs		
1995–1998	ASEC Mimosas		
1998–1999	KV Kortrijk		
1999–2001	Kickers Emden		
2001–2005	VfB Oldenburg	99	(8)
2005–2006	GVO Oldenburg		
2006–2007	SSV Jeddeloh		

International career
1991–2003	Congo	30	(1)
- * Club domestic league appearances and goals

Florent Baloki (10 October 1971 – 9 November 2007) was a Congolese footballer. He played in 20 matches for the Congo national football team from 1992 to 1999. He was also named in Congo's squad for the 1992 African Cup of Nations tournament.

He won the 1998 CAF Champions League with Ivorian club ASEC Mimosas with teammate Blaise Kouassi.

== Honours ==
=== Club ===
Diables Noirs

- Congo Premier League: 1991
- Coupe du Congo: 1989, 1990

ASEC Mimosas

- CAF Champions League: 1998
- Ligue 1: 1995, 1997, 1998
- Coupe de Côte d'Ivoire: 1995, 1997
- Coupe Houphouët-Boigny: 1995, 1997, 1998
