= Pierre Lechantre =

French footballer (born 1950)

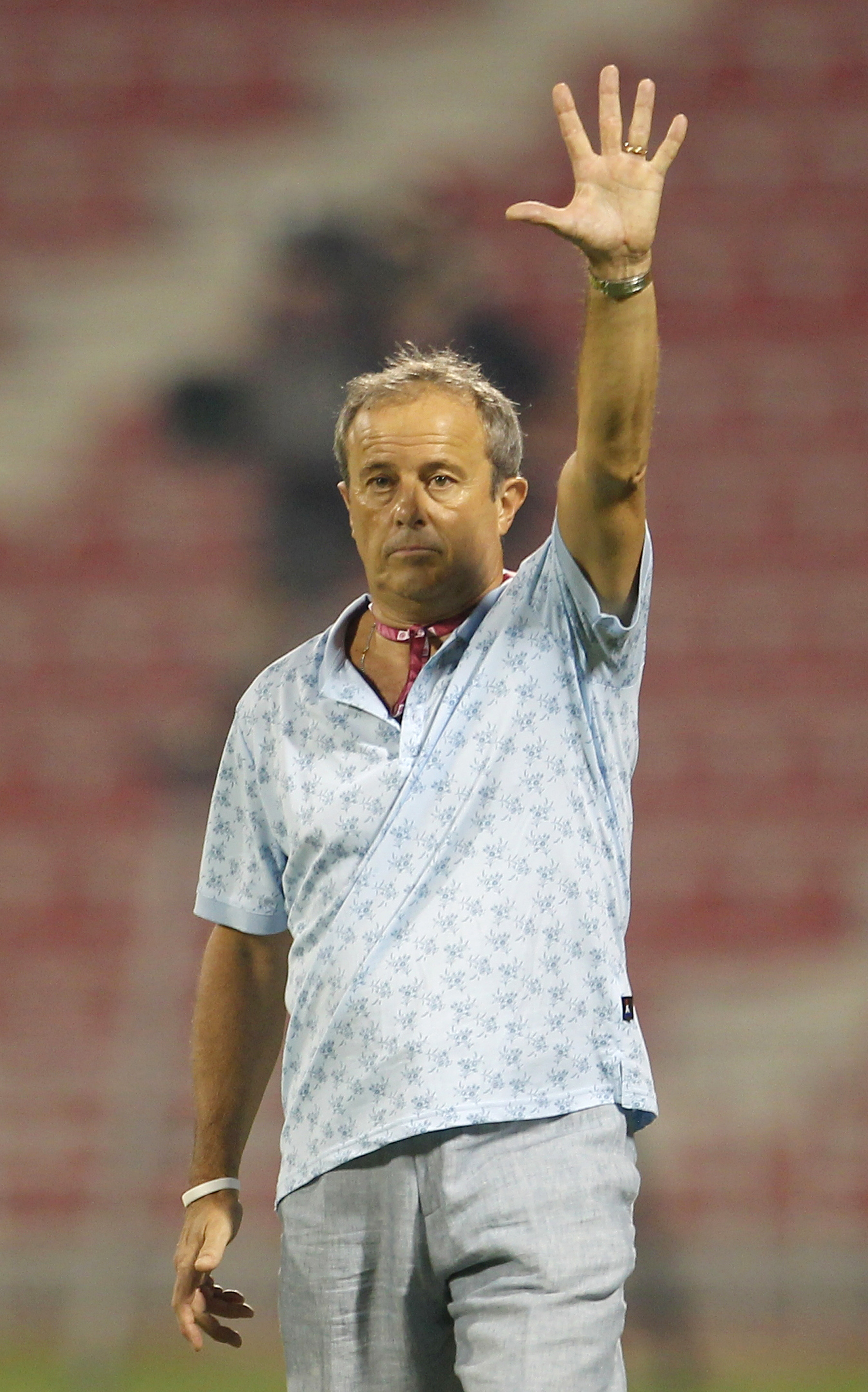
- Lechantre in 2012

Personal information
- Date of birth: 2 April 1950 (age 76)
- Place of birth: Lille, France
- Position: Striker

Youth career
- 1955–1964: Lambersart
- 1964–1970: Lille

Senior career*
Years	Team	Apps	(Gls)
1970–1975	Sochaux		
1975–1976	Monaco		
1976–1979	Laval		
1979–1980	Lens		
1980–1981	Marseille		
1981–1983	Reims		
1983–1986	Red Star		
1986–1989	Paris FC		

Managerial career
- 1987–1992: Paris FC
- 1992–1995: Le Perreux
- 1999–2001: Cameroon
- 2002–2003: Qatar
- 2003: Al-Ahli
- 2003–2004: Al-Siliya
- 2005–2006: Mali
- 2006–2007: Al Rayyan
- 2007–2008: MAS Fès
- 2009–2010: Club Africain
- 2010: CS Sfaxien
- 2012–2013: Al Arabi
- 2015: Al-Ittihad Club Tripoli
- 2016: Congo
- 2018: Simba
Medal record
Men's football
Representing Cameroon (as manager)
Africa Cup of Nations
Winner	2000 Ghana-Nigeria
- * Club domestic league appearances and goals

Pierre Lechantre (born 2 April 1950) is a French football coach and former player. He won the 2000 African Cup of Nations with the Cameroon national team.

== Career ==
On 27 April 2012, Lechantre was named as the head coach of Senegal, but failed to reach a final agreement with the Senegalese Football Federation on the terms of his contract.

In April 2018 he was one of 77 applicants for the vacant Cameroon national team job.

== Honours ==
=== As Manager ===
Cameroon

- African Cup of Nations: 2000
