= Eben Dugbatey =

Ghanaian footballer

Personal information
- Full name: Ebenezer Dorkutso Dugbatey
- Date of birth: 31 July 1973 (age 53)
- Place of birth: Accra, Ghana
- Height: 1.80 m (5 ft 11 in)
- Position: Defender

Youth career
- Great Olympics

Senior career*
Years	Team	Apps	(Gls)
1988–1992	Hearts of Oak		
1992–1993	Ronse		
1994–1995	Samsunspor	4	(0)
1995–1996	FC Solothurn	25	(1)
1996–1997	Casa Pia Calcio		
1997–2000	Lorient	78	(0)
2000–2001	La Louvière	3	(0)
2001–2002	Lorient B		
2002–2003	Cambridge United		

International career
1998–2000	Ghana	7	(0)
- * Club domestic league appearances and goals

Ebenezer Dorkutso Dugbatey (born 31 July 1973) is a Ghanaian former professional footballer who played as a defender for clubs in Africa and Europe.

== Club career ==
Dugbatey was born in Accra. He played for FC Lorient in the French Ligue 1 and Ligue 2. (Note: Eben Dugbatey – French league stats at LFP – also available in French (archived)) He had a brief spell with Samsunspor in the Turkish Süper Lig.

== International career ==
Dugbatey made seven appearances for the full Ghana national team, including two matches at the 2000 African Cup of Nations finals, where he was the first player to be sent off in the tournament. He also made two appearances in qualifying matches for the 2002 FIFA World Cup.
