= Willy Okpara =

Nigerian footballer

William Okpara
Personal information
- Full name: Williams Nwadinobi Okpara
- Date of birth: 7 May 1968 (age 58)
- Place of birth: Lagos, Nigeria
- Height: 1.80 m (5 ft 11 in)
- Position: Goalkeeper

Team information
- Current team: Orlando Pirates (Goalkeeping coach)

Senior career*
| Years | Team | Apps | (Gls) |
| 1987–1989 | ACB Lagos | 56 | (0) |
| 1989–2005 | Orlando Pirates | 374 | (0) |
| Total | | 430 | (0) |

International career
| 1986 | Nigeria U-17 | | |
| 1987 | Nigeria U-20 | 3 | (0) |
| 1992 | Nigeria Futsal | 1 | (0) |
| 1996–1998 | Nigeria | 5 | (0) |
- * Club domestic league appearances and goals

Williams Nwadinobi Okpara (born 7 May 1968) is a Nigerian former professional footballer who played as a goalkeeper. Having started his career with ACB Lagos, he spent more than a decade with South African side Orlando Pirates.

== Career ==
Born in Lagos, Okpara played for ACB Lagos from 1987 to 1989 before moving to South African side Orlando Pirates. Okpara was the club's first choice goalkeeper from 1990 to 2002, losing his place to Congolese goalkeeper Michel Babale during 2002–03 season, then becoming an understudy to Thabang Radebe and Francis Chansa before retiring in 2005. He holds the record of Pirates' appearances with 375 matches, and is also the club's longest serving player. He was part of the 1995 CAF Champions League winning team.

== International career ==
Okpara was Nigeria under-20's first choice goalkeeper during 1987 FIFA World Youth Championship, playing in all three matches as Nigeria failed to win during the group stage. He played for Nigeria national futsal team at 1992 FIFA Futsal World Championship as an outfield player, featuring in the 5–4 loss against Poland when he was sent off.

He made his debut for the Nigeria national team in 1996 and was selected for the 1998 FIFA World Cup squad.

== Retirement ==
After his retirement, Okpara became a goalkeeping coach for Orlando Pirates.

== Honours ==
- Premier Soccer League: 2000–01, 2002–03
- National Soccer League: 1994
- Nedbank Cup: 1996
- MTN 8: 1993, 1996, 2000
- Castle Challenge: 1992
- CAF Champions League: 1995
- CAF Super Cup: 1996
