= Gottlieb Göller =

German football player and manager (1935–2004)

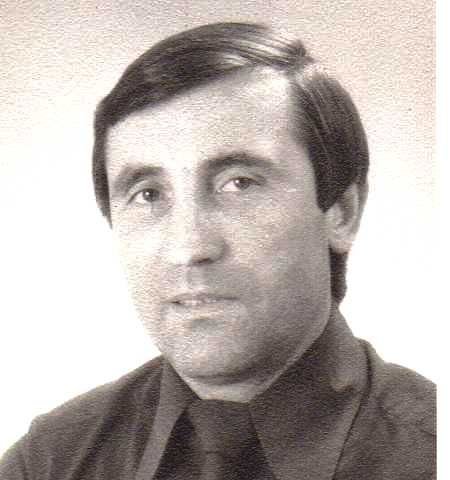

Personal information
- Date of birth: 31 May 1935
- Place of birth: Nuremberg, Germany
- Date of death: 27 August 2004 (aged 69)
- Place of death: Basel, Switzerland
- Position: Forward

Senior career*
Years	Team	Apps	(Gls)
1953–1955	1. FC Nürnberg		
1955–1956	Bayern Hof		
1956–1961	VfL Neustadt		
1961–1962	Wormatia Worms		
1962–1963	FK Pirmasens		

Managerial career
- 1972: Togo
- 1979–1981: Julius Berger F.C.
- 1981: Nigeria
- 1984: Togo
- 1996–1997: Togo
- 1998–2000: Togo
- * Club domestic league appearances and goals

Gottlieb Göller (31 May 1935 – 27 August 2004) was a German football player and manager.

== Playing career ==
Göller played for 1. FC Nürnberg, Bayern Hof, VfL Neustadt, Wormatia Worms and FK Pirmasens.

== Coaching career ==
After this he worked as an engineer. When working in Togo in 1970 he was given responsibility over the national football team there through mediation of the German ambassador. He took the side to the African Nations Cup of 1972, the country's first participation in an international competition. Later in the 1970s he had a stint with the Nigerian club Julius Berger F.C. and in 1981 he managed the Nigerian national side for one game.

After a short time in Moçambique he returned to Togo where he took on the national team on three more occasions, on taking it to the African Nations Cup tournaments of 1984, 1998 and 2000. At all of Togo's participations the team exited after the first round.
