= Sékou Bamba =

Ivorian footballer (1970–2008)

Personal information
- Full name: Sékou Bamba de Karamoko
- Date of birth: 25 February 1970
- Place of birth: Odienné, Ivory Coast
- Date of death: April 19, 2008 (aged 38)
- Place of death: Abidjan, Ivory Coast
- Position: Forward

Youth career
- AS Denguélé

Senior career*
Years	Team	Apps	(Gls)
1988–1992	Africa Sports National		
1993–1995	ASEC Mimosas		
1996–1998	Stade d'Abidjan		
1998	Antalyaspor	12	(0)

International career
1987–1995	Ivory Coast	14	(6)
- * Club domestic league appearances and goals

Sékou Bamba de Karamoko (25 February 1970 in Odienné – 19 April 2008 in Abidjan) was an Ivorian professional footballer who played as a midfielder for several clubs in Africa and Europe.

== Club career ==
Bamba played for Africa Sports National, ASEC Mimosas and Stade d'Abidjan in Ivory Coast. He had a brief spell with Antalyaspor in the Turkish Super Lig.

Bamba was part of ASEC's squad that were finalists at the African Cup of Champions Clubs 1995.

== International career ==
Bamba played for the full Ivory Coast national football team, including appearing at the 1987 All-Africa Games and in qualifying matches for the 1990 FIFA World Cup. He was selected to play at the 1992 African Cup of Nations in Senegal, but refused to join the team.

== Death ==
Bamba died at the age of 38. He left behind one son and two daughters.
