= Lantame Ouadja =

Togolese footballer

Personal information
- Full name: Lantame Sakibau Ouadja
- Date of birth: 28 August 1977 (age 49)
- Place of birth: Lomé, Togo
- Height: 1.85 m (6 ft 1 in)
- Position: Midfielder

Senior career*
Years	Team	Apps	(Gls)
1994–1995	Étoile Filante	29	(7)
1995–1997	Club Africain	51	(12)
1997–2001	Servette FC	59	(3)
2000	→ Chengdu Wuniu Guoteng (loan)	12	(0)
2001–2003	Étoile Carouge FC	11	(1)
2003	Al Sadd SC	0	(0)
2003–2004	Wisła Kraków	9	(0)
2004–2005	US Monastir		
2007–2009	PSM Makassar		

International career
1994–2005	Togo	50	(5)
- * Club domestic league appearances and goals

Lantame Sakibau Ouadja (born 28 August 1977) is a Togolese former professional footballer who played as a midfielder.

He was a member of the Togo national team, making 12 appearances and scoring one goal.

While playing for PSM Makassar in the 2008–09 ISL, Ouadja was named captain just before the match against Pelita Jaya.
