= Marc Batchelor =

South African soccer player (1970–2019)

Personal information
- Date of birth: 4 January 1970
- Place of birth: Johannesburg, South Africa
- Date of death: 15 July 2019 (aged 49)
- Place of death: Olivedale, South Africa
- Position: Striker

Youth career
- Wanderers
- Balfour Park
- Berea Park
- Defence

Senior career*
Years	Team	Apps	(Gls)
1990–1992	Dynamos	62	(25)
1992–1994	Bidvest Wits		
1994–1996	Orlando Pirates		
1996–1997	SuperSport United	33	(7)
1997–2000	Kaizer Chiefs		
2000–2001	Mamelodi Sundowns		
2001–2003	Moroka Swallows	24	(10)
- * Club domestic league appearances and goals

Marc Batchelor (4 January 1970 – 15 July 2019) was a South African professional soccer player who played as a striker.

== Career ==
Born in Johannesburg on 4 January 1970, Batchelor spent his early career with Wanderers, Balfour Park, Berea Park and Defence. He joined Dynamos in 1990, and later played for Bidvest Wits, Orlando Pirates, SuperSport United, Kaizer Chiefs, Mamelodi Sundowns and Moroka Swallows.

He won four major trophies with Orlando Pirates, including the 1995 African Cup of Champions Clubs.

== Later life and death ==
After retiring from professional football in 2003, Batchelor worked as a television pundit. However, he was fired in 2007 after a fight in a restaurant.

In 2014 Batchelor was a witness in the trial of Oscar Pistorius.

He was murdered outside his home in Olivedale on 15 July 2019.

== See also ==
- List of unsolved murders (2000–present)
