= Mohamed Coubageat =

Togolese footballer

Personal information
- Full name: Mohamed Sadik Coubageat
- Date of birth: November 16, 1982 (age 43)
- Place of birth: Togo
- Height: 1.77 m (5 ft 10 in)
- Position: Midfielder

Senior career*
Years	Team	Apps	(Gls)
–2000	FC Wangen bei Olten		
2000–2001	FC Grenchen		
2001–2005	BSC Young Boys	29	(0)
2006–2007	SC Young Fellows Juventus	33	(7)

International career^{‡}
	Togo	21	(0)
- * Club domestic league appearances and goals as of 16 May 2016 (UTC) ‡ National team caps and goals as of 16 May 2016

Mohamed Sadik Coubageat (born 16 November 1982 in Lomé) is a retired Togolese football midfielder.

He was a member of the Togo national football team making 21 appearances.
