= Joe Frickleton =

Scottish footballer and manager (c.1935–2020)

Personal information
- Date of birth: c. 1935
- Place of birth: Scotland
- Date of death: 14 December 2020
- Place of death: Cape Town, South Africa
- Position: Wing half

Youth career
- Clydebank Juniors

Senior career*
Years	Team	Apps	(Gls)
1959–1964	East Stirlingshire	107	(15)
1964–1974	Highlands Park		

Managerial career
- 1974–1976: Highlands Park
- 1977: Lusitano
- 1978–1983: Highlands Park
- 1984–1985: Kaizer Chiefs
- 1995: Orlando Pirates
- * Club domestic league appearances and goals

Joe Frickleton (c. 1935 – 14 December 2020) was a Scottish professional football player and manager, active primarily in South Africa

== Playing career ==
Frickleton, who played as a wing half, played youth with Clydebank Juniors, before turning professional with East Stirlingshire, where he made 107 appearances in the Scottish Football League between 1959 and 1964.

He then moved to South Africa to play with Highlands Park, where he won three national championships.

== Coaching career ==
After his playing days were over, Frickleton remained in South Africa, and trained as a football manager. His first job was at former club Highlands Park in 1974. After a season spent with Lusitano, Frickleton returned to Highlands Park until it was sold in 1983. He later won four trophies with Kaizer Chiefs in 1984, before winning the Champions Cup with Orlando Pirates in 1995.

== Later life and death ==
He was hospitalised in May 2020 in Cape Town due to ill health. His death was reported on 15 December 2020.

== Honours ==
=== Manager ===
Highlands Park

- NPSL Championship: 1980
- NFL Championship: 1975
- NFL Cup: 1975

Lusitano

- NFL Cup: 1977

Kaiser Chiefs

- NPSL Championship: 1984
- MTN 8 Cup: 1985
- Telkom Knockout Cup: 1984
- Nedbank Cup: 1984

Orlando Pirates

- CAF Champions League: 1995
