= Charles Dago =

Ivorian footballer (born 1975)

Personal information
- Date of birth: 1 November 1975 (age 50)
- Place of birth: Koumassi, Ivory Coast
- Height: 1.72 m (5 ft 8 in)
- Position: Striker

Senior career*
Years	Team	Apps	(Gls)
- Africa Sports
- Motemba Pembe
1999–2001	Lokeren	29	(6)
2001–2004	Al-Arabi		
2004–2006	Al-Salmiya		
2006–2008	Al-Tadamon		
- * Club domestic league appearances and goals

Charles Dago (born 1 November 1975) is an Ivorian former professional footballer. He played as a striker for K.S.C. Lokeren O.V. in the Belgian Pro League and for Al-Arabi, Al-Salmiya and Al-Tadamon in Kuwaiti Premier League.
