= Stephen Baidoo =

Ghanaian former football player

Personal information
- Date of birth: 25 February 1976 (age 50)
- Place of birth: Sekondi-Takoradi, Ghana
- Position: Midfielder

Youth career
- 1991–1993: Great Eagles of Tamale

Senior career*
Years	Team	Apps	(Gls)
1993–1996	Ashanti Gold SC		
1996–2000	MKE Ankaragücü	98	(21)
2000–2002	Samsunspor	43	(2)
2002–2005	MKE Ankaragücü	60	(19)
2006–2008	King Faisal Babes		

International career
1994–2001	Ghana	32	(1)
- * Club domestic league appearances and goals

Stephen Baidoo (born 25 February 1976, in Sekondi-Takoradi) is a Ghanaian former football player who last played for King Faisal Babes. He previously played domestically for Great Eagles of Tamale and Goldfields Obuasi and in Turkey for MKE Ankaragücü and Samsunspor.

== International ==
Baidoo was part of the Ghanaian 2000 African Nations Cup team, who exited in the quarter-finals after losing to South Africa. He was also a member of the Ghanaian squad at the 1996 Summer Olympics.
