= Mark Edusei =

Ghanaian footballer

Personal information
- Date of birth: 29 September 1976 (age 50)
- Place of birth: Kumasi, Ghana
- Height: 1.77 m (5 ft 9 1/2 in)
- Position: Midfielder

Senior career*
Years	Team	Apps	(Gls)
1994–1995	King Faisal Babes		
1995	Al-Ahli	1	(0)
1995	Hapoel Petah Tikva	14	(0)
1996–2001	Lecce	26	(1)
1997–1998	→ Leiria (loan)	26	(3)
1999–2000	→ Leiria (loan)	16	(0)
2000–2001	→ Bellinzona (loan)	11	(0)
2001–2003	Cosenza	66	(5)
2003–2006	Sampdoria	22	(1)
2003–2004	→ Piacenza (loan)	22	(0)
2005–2006	→ Torino (loan)	32	(0)
2006–2008	Catania	58	(0)
2009	Bari	8	(0)
2010–2011	Bellinzona	43	(2)

International career
1999–2004	Ghana	10	(0)
- * Club domestic league appearances and goals

Mark Edusei (born 29 September 1976 in Kumasi) is a former Ghanaian football midfielder. Throughout his career Edusei moved around a lot, playing for clubs based in six countries.

== Career ==
=== Catania ===
From the 2006–2007 season he played for Serie A team Calcio Catania. The Sicily team signed him in co-ownership deal for €120,000. In June 2007 Catania acquired him for an additional €150,000. Edusei became a big part of the Catania team off the bench and from the start on occasions. During his three-season stint, he made over 25 appearances.

=== Late career ===
After taking no part in field play during the first six months of the 08-09 Serie A season, Edusei was allowed to Bari in January 2009. Edusei signed a deal until June 2010.

In December 2009 he signed a contract until the end of season with optional 1 more year with Bellinzona.

== International ==
Edusei has also represented the Ghana national team.
