= Innocent Hamga =

Cameroonian footballer

Personal information
- Date of birth: 8 May 1981 (age 45)
- Place of birth: Edéa, Cameroon
- Height: 1.78 m (5 ft 10 in)
- Position: Defender

Youth career
- Sportclub Garoua
- –1996: Rail Douala

Senior career*
| Years | Team | Apps | (Gls) |
| 1996–1999 | Cotonsport Garoua | 81 | (0) |
| 2000 | Barcelona B | 8 | (0) |
| 2000–2001 | Espanyol | 9 | (0) |
| 2001–2003 | Martigues | 31 | (0) |
| 2004–2005 | Marseille B | 1 | (0) |
| 2005–2006 | Cassis Carnoux | 15 | (0) |
| 2006–2007 | Gaillard | 12 | (0) |
| 2007–2008 | Garoua | 28 | (0) |
| Total | | 185 | (0) |

International career
| 2000 | Cameroon | 2 | (0) |
Medal record
Representing Cameroon
Africa Cup of Nations
| Winner | 2000 Ghana-Nigeria |
- * Club domestic league appearances and goals

Innocent Hamga (born 8 May 1981) is a Cameroonian former professional footballer who played as a defender.

== International career ==
Hamga holds 22 games for Cameroon and 2 goals. He was member at 2000 African Cup of Nations in Ghana and Nigeria. He played four games at 1999 FIFA World Youth Championship.

== Honours ==
Cotonsport Garoua

- Cameroon League: 1998, 1999

Cameroon

- African Cup of Nations: 2000

Cameroon U21

- U-21 Africa-Cup runner-up: 1999
