= Koffi Fiawoo =

Togolese footballer

Personal information
- Date of birth: 3 October 1969
- Place of birth: Tsevik, Togo
- Height: 1.82 m (6 ft 0 in)
- Position: Striker

Senior career*
Years	Team	Apps	(Gls)
1988–1993	Niort	116	(26)
1993–1995	Le Mans	34	(9)
1995–1997	Louhans-Cuiseaux	70	(24)
1997–1999	Sochaux	34	(11)
1999–2001	Lorient	24	(2)
2002	US Créteil	6	(2)
Total		284	(74)

International career
2000	Togo	2	(0)
- * Club domestic league appearances and goals

Koffi Fiawoo (born 3 October 1969) is a Togolese former professional footballer who played as a striker.

He was part of the Togo national team at the 2000 African Cup of Nations team, which finished bottom of group A in the first round of competition, thus failing to secure qualification for the quarter-finals.
