= Seydou Diarra (footballer) =

Ivorian footballer

Personal information
- Date of birth: 16 April 1968 (age 58)
- Place of birth: Adjamé, Ivory Coast
- Position: Goalkeeper

International career
Years	Team	Apps	(Gls)
1996–1999	Ivory Coast	12	(0)

Seydou Diarra (born 16 April 1968) is an Ivorian former footballer who played as a goalkeeper. He played in 12 matches for the Ivory Coast national team from 1996 to 1999. He was also named in Ivory Coast's squad for the 1998 African Cup of Nations tournament.
