= Jerry Sikhosana =

South African soccer player (born 1969)

Personal information
- Date of birth: 8 June 1969 (age 57)
- Place of birth: Tembisa, South Africa
- Height: 1.74 m (5 ft 9 in)
- Position: Forward

Senior career*
Years	Team	Apps	(Gls)
1991	Giant Blackpool		
1992–1993	Witbank Aces	43	(7)
1993–1998	Orlando Pirates	107	(42)
1999	Yunnan Hongta	22	(13)
1999–2000	AmaZulu	7	(1)
2000–2001	Orlando Pirates	18	(2)
2001–2002	Tembisa Classic	2	(2)
2002–2003	City Sharks Johannesburg		

International career
1996–1998	South Africa	10	(0)
- * Club domestic league appearances and goals

Jerry Sikhosana (born 8 June 1969) is a South African former soccer player.

== Club career ==
Playing most of his career at Orlando Pirates, he was an assumed fan of Pirates' fierce rival Kaizer Chiefs, and also performed for his team at the Soweto derbies, including a hat-trick in the 1996 Bob Save Superbowl semifinal, a game known as the Jerry Sikhosana derby. He was nicknamed "Legs of Thunder" after a champion racehorse that was a character on a South African TV series, and has earned legendary status at Orlando Pirates as a formidable goal poacher in the 1990s.

He also scored to help Pirates to victory in the replayed final of the 1996 BP Top 8.

He was part of the 1995 African Champions League winning team.

== International career ==
He played for South Africa national soccer team and was part of the squad that travelled to France for the 1998 FIFA World Cup.
