= Lassina Dao =

Ivorian footballer

Personal information
- Full name: Lassina Dao
- Date of birth: 6 February 1971 (age 55)
- Place of birth: Ivory Coast
- Position: Defender

Senior career*
Years	Team	Apps	(Gls)
1988–1991	ASC Bouaké		
1991–1996	ASEC Mimosas		
1998–2002	Africa Sports d'Abidjan		
2002–2004	Al-Ittihad Tripoli		

International career
1991–2000	Ivory Coast	24	(1)
- * Club domestic league appearances and goals

Lassina Dao (born 6 February 1971) is a retired Ivorian footballer.

He was a member of the Ivory Coast squad for the 1992, 1994, 1996, 1998 and 2000 Africa Cup of Nations.
