= Kick Off (magazine) =

South African football magazine

- Cover
- Editor: Richard Maguire
- Categories: Football
- Frequency: Monthly
- Circulation: 36,249 (Jul-Sept. 2015)
- Founded: 1994
- Company: Media24
- Country: South Africa
- Based in: Cape Town
- Language: English
- Website: www.kickoff.com

Kick Off is a football magazine and website published by Media24. Its main focus is on domestic South African competitions including the Premier Soccer League.

== History and profile ==
The magazine was established in 1994 by Rob Moore and has its headquarters in Cape Town. Kick Off is published on a monthly basis.

Kick Off had a circulation of 36,249 copies between July and September 2015, and has well over 1.5 million readers according to industry measurements. The magazine also produces an annual yearbook (annual statistical review/preview) that goes on sale each September.

In 2010, Kick Off was involved in producing FIFA’s official media for the 2010 FIFA World Cup, on behalf of then holding company, Touchline Media.
