= Aliou Siby Badra =

Ivorian former professional footballer

Personal information
- Full name: Aliou Siby Badra
- Date of birth: February 26, 1971 (age 55)
- Place of birth: Ivory Coast
- Position: Midfielder

Senior career*
Years	Team	Apps	(Gls)
1993–2001	ASEC Mimosas		
2001–2002	Club Africain		
2002–2004	Al-Hilal		

International career
1993–2002	Ivory Coast	37	(0)
- * Club domestic league appearances and goals

Aliou Siby Badra is an Ivorian former professional footballer who played as a midfielder for ASEC Mimosas, Club Africain, and Al-Hilal FC.
