= Edward Motale =

South African soccer player

Personal information
- Full name: Edward Madumetja Motale
- Date of birth: 29 July 1966 (age 60)
- Place of birth: Mamelodi, South Africa
- Position: Defender

Youth career
- Arcadia Shepherds

Senior career*
Years	Team	Apps	(Gls)
1992–1993	Dynamos		
1994–1997	Orlando Pirates		

International career
1994–1995	South Africa	7	(2)
- * Club domestic league appearances and goals

Edward Motale (born 29 July 1966) is a South African former soccer player who played at both professional and international levels as a defender. Motale played club football for Dynamos and Orlando Pirates; he also earned seven caps for the South African national side between 1994 and 1995, scoring two goals. He won the 1995 African Champions League with Orlando Pirates. Motale was also part of the squad that won the 1996 African Cup of Nations.

== Career statistics ==
=== International goals ===
#	Date	Venue	Opponent	Score	Result	Competition
1.	3 December 1994	Ellis Park, Johannesburg, South Africa	Cameroon	1–1	Draw	Simba Cup
2.	26 April 1995	Setsoto Stadium, Maseru, Lesotho	Lesotho	1–3	Win	Friendly
Correct as of 9 March 2017
