= Gavin Lane =

South African soccer player

Personal information
- Date of birth: 26 December 1966 (age 59)
- Place of birth: Boksburg, South Africa
- Position: Central defender

Youth career
- Benoni Northerns

Senior career*
Years	Team	Apps	(Gls)
1989–1991	Giant Blackpool		
- Orlando Pirates
- Moroka Swallows
- AmaZulu

International career
1997	South Africa	2	(0)
- * Club domestic league appearances and goals

Gavin Lane (born 26 November 1966) is a South African former soccer player who played as a defender. He played professionally for Giant Blackpool, Orlando Pirates, Moroka Swallows and AmaZulu and also represented South Africa.

During his career he was nicknamed "Stability Unit" and was a member of Orlando Pirates 1995 African Cup of Champions Clubs winning squad.

== After retirement ==
Gavin Lane used to work as a contract manager at a renovation company, Gordon Verhoef & Krause. Gavin now owns a painting and renovations company called Gavin Lane Projects .

== Personal life ==
He lives in Durban with his wife Lesley and his two sons, Kyle Lane (born 1989) and Devin Lane (born 1993).
