= Chérif Touré Mamam =

Togolese footballer

Cherif-Touré Mamam
Personal information
- Full name: Cherif-Touré Mamam
- Date of birth: 13 January 1978 (age 48)
- Place of birth: Mango, Togo
- Height: 1.84 m (6 ft 0 in)
- Position: Midfielder

Youth career
- –1996: EF Lomé

Senior career*
Years	Team	Apps	(Gls)
1996–1998	Eintracht Frankfurt		
1998–1999	Marseille		
1999–2000	Al-Jazeera		
2000	Al-Nasr		
2001	Hannover 96	3	(0)
2001–2005	Livingston	31	(3)
2005–2006	Metz	10	(0)
2006–2007	Rapid București	0	(0)
2007–2008	Al-Jazeera	16	(3)
2008–2011	MC Alger	7	(0)
2009	→ Al-Oruba (loan)	18	(0)

International career
1998–2009	Togo	47	(7)
- * Club domestic league appearances and goals

Cherif-Touré Mamam (born 13 January 1978) is a Togolese former professional footballer who played as a midfielder for the Togo national team.

== Club career ==
During his time at Livingston, Touré wore number 91. This is said to be his lucky number from his childhood as he had a basketball shirt bearing that number. He also had "Sheriff" on the shirt but the Scottish Premier League ordered him to use his real name. His most memorable moment at Livingston was scoring twice in a 5–1 win at Motherwell in October 2002.

Touré was in January 2005 on a trial with Norwegian club SK Brann, where he claimed that he was born in 1985 and that he had never played for any clubs in Europe, despite having previously played for the Scottish side Livingston where he was registered as born in 1981. One of Brann's players, Charlie Miller who had previously played for Dundee United, asked him if he was the same player as the one who used to play for Livingston, but Toure denied this.

== International career ==
Touré was a member of the Togo national team and played in the 1998, 2000, 2006 African Cup of Nations, and was called up to the 2006 World Cup in Germany.

== Personal life ==
His brother Souleymane Mamam played for the Togo national team. Although Mamam is the family name, Cherif Touré had his Christian names on the back of his shirt.
