= Mamadou Zaré =

Ivorian footballer and manager

Personal information
- Date of birth: 19 May 1964
- Place of birth: Treichville, Abidjan, Ivory Coast
- Date of death: 3 May 2007 (aged 42)
- Place of death: Abidjan, Ivory Coast

Senior career*
Years	Team	Apps	(Gls)
- ASEC Mimosas

International career
- Ivory Coast

Managerial career
- 1993: Sabé Sports
- 1994–1995: ASEC Mimosas
- Séwé Sports
- 2000: Issia Wazi
- * Club domestic league appearances and goals

Mamadou Zaré (19 May 1964 – 3 May 2007) was an Ivorian football player and manager.

== Career ==
With roots in Burkina Faso, Zaré had played for ASEC Mimosas in midfield and central defence before becoming a coach. As a player, he won three league championships, the first in 1980, followed by consecutives titles in 1990 and 1991 under the guidance of French coach Philippe Troussier.

== International career ==
He was also capped by the Ivory Coast during the 1980s.

== Coaching career ==
Zaré began his managerial career with Sabé Sports de Bouna in 1993 before moving onto ASEC in 1995. He led the Mimosas to a domestic league and cup double in 1995 as well as a place in the final of the African Club Champions Cup where they finished runners-up to Orlando Pirates of South Africa. Zaré also coached various other top flight clubs in the Côte d'Ivoire Premier Division including Stade d'Abidjan, Séwé Sports de San Pedro and Issia Wazi. When Burkina Faso hosted the African Cup of Nations in 1998, he served under Troussier as assistant coach of the home team.

== Death ==
Zaré died on 3 May 2007 at a medical centre in Abidjan aged 45 following a long illness.
