= Ghislain Akassou =

Ivorian former professional footballer

Personal information
- Full name: Ghislain Akassou
- Date of birth: 15 February 1975 (age 51)
- Place of birth: Abidjan, Ivory Coast
- Height: 1.82 m (6 ft 0 in)
- Position: Defender

Youth career
- –1995: Mimosas U19

Senior career*
Years	Team	Apps	(Gls)
1995–1998	ASEC Mimosas		
1998–1999	Lugano	33	(1)
1999	Beveren		
1999–2002	Pistoiese	31	(2)
2002–2003	Siena	10	(0)
2003–2004	Pistoiese		
2004–2005	Prato	23	(3)
2005–2006	Pro Italia Galatina	12	(0)
2006	Sambenedettese	2	(1)
Total		111	(7)

International career
1997–2003	Ivory Coast	29	(1)
- * Club domestic league appearances and goals

Ghislain Akassou (born 15 February 1975) is an Ivorian former professional footballer who played as a defender. He was a member of the Ivory Coast squad for the 1998, 2000 and 2002 Africa Cup of Nations.
