= 1995 African Cup of Champions Clubs =

Tournament details
- Dates: 1995
- Teams: 33 (from 33 associations)

Final positions
- Champions: (South Africa) Orlando Pirates (1st title)
- Runners-up: (Ivory Coast) ASEC Mimosas

Tournament statistics
- Matches played: 62
- Goals scored: 155 (2.5 per match)

The 1995 African Cup of Champions Clubs was the 31st edition of the annual international club football competition held in the CAF region (Africa), the African Cup of Champions Clubs. It determined that year's club champion of association football in Africa.

Orlando Pirates from South Africa won that final, and became for the first time CAF club champion.

== Preliminary round ==
Team 1	Agg.	Team 2	1st leg	2nd leg
Eleven Men in Flight (Eswatini)	4–4 (4–2 p)	(Botswana) Lobatse CS Gunners	2–2	2–2

=== First leg ===
5 February 1995

Eleven Men in Flight (Eswatini)	2–2	(Botswana) Lobatse CS Gunners

=== Second leg ===
19 February 1995

Lobatse CS Gunners (Botswana)	2–2	(Eswatini) Eleven Men in Flight
Penalties
	3–4

4-4 on aggregate; Eleven Men won on penalties.

== First round ==
Team 1	Agg.	Team 2	1st leg	2nd leg
Eleven Men in Flight (Eswatini)	0–5	(South Africa) Orlando Pirates	0–3	0–2
Fire Brigade SC (Mauritius)	3–1	(Mozambique) Costa do Sol	3–0	0–1
Dynamos FC (Zimbabwe)	2–0	(Sudan) Al-Hilal	1–0	1–0
Fantastique FC (Burundi)	0–2	(Egypt) Ismaily	0–1	0–1
LDF (Lesotho)	2–6	(Réunion) JS Saint-Pierroise	2–2	0–4
Force Nationale de Securité (Djibouti)	0–9	(Uganda) Express FC	0–2	0–7
Étoile du Congo (Republic of the Congo)	3–3 (a)	(Cameroon) Aigle Nkongsamba	3–2	0–1
Étoile Filante (Burkina Faso)	2–5	(Tunisia) Espérance de Tunis	1–1	1–4
Semassi FC (Togo)	0–2	(Nigeria) BCC Lions	0–1	0–1
Real Banjul (The Gambia)	1–0	(Cape Verde) CD Travadores	1–0	0–0
Mbilinga FC (Gabon)	6–4	(Zaire) Vita Club	4–0	2–4
Petro Atlético (Angola)	2–5	(Ivory Coast) ASEC Mimosas	1–2	1–3
Power Dynamos (Zambia)	2–2 (3–4 p)	(Tanzania) Simba SC	1–1	1–1
NPA Anchors (Liberia)	1–8	(Ghana) Obuasi Goldfields	0–0	1–8
Stade Malien (Mali)	2–1	(Guinea) Horoya AC	1–0	1–1
US Chaouia (Algeria)	w/o	(Benin) Dragons de l'Ouémé	—	—

- Dragons de l'Ouémé from Benin withdrew.
- Club Olympique Casablanca from Morocco withdrew before the first leg.

=== First leg ===
10 March 1995

Force Nationale de Securité (Djibouti)	0–2	(Uganda) Express FC

12 March 1995

Stade Malien (Mali)	1–0	(Guinea) Horoya AC

12 March 1995

NPA Anchors (Liberia)	0–0	(Ghana) Obuasi Goldfields

12 March 1995

Power Dynamos (Zambia)	1–1	(Tanzania) Simba SC

12 March 1995

Petro Atlético (Angola)	1–2	(Ivory Coast) ASEC Mimosas

12 March 1995

Mbilinga FC (Gabon)	4–0	(Zaire) Vita Club

12 March 1995

Real Banjul (The Gambia)	1–0	(Cape Verde) CD Travadores

12 March 1995

Eleven Men in Flight (Eswatini)	0–3	(South Africa) Orlando Pirates
		Ramokadi 30', 51'; Motale 73'

12 March 1995

Semassi FC (Togo)	0–1	(Nigeria) BCC Lions

12 March 1995

Fire Brigade SC (Mauritius)	3–0	(Mozambique) Costa do Sol

12 March 1995

Étoile Filante (Burkina Faso)	1–1	(Tunisia) Espérance de Tunis

12 March 1995

Dynamos FC (Zimbabwe)	1–0	(Sudan) Al-Hilal

12 March 1995

Fantastique FC (Burundi)	0–1	(Egypt) Ismaily
	Report	El-Agouz 4'

12 March 1995

Étoile du Congo (Republic of the Congo)	3–2	(Cameroon) Aigle Nkongsamba

12 March 1995

Lesotho Defence Force FC	2–2	(Réunion) JS Saint-Pierroise

=== Second leg ===
25 March 1995

Express FC (Uganda)	7–0	(Djibouti) Force Nationale de Securité

Express FC won 9–0 on aggregate.

25 March 1995

Orlando Pirates (South Africa)	2–0	(Eswatini) Eleven Men in Flight
Lane 2'; Maponyane 89'

Orlando Pirates won 5–0 on aggregate.

25 March 1995

BCC Lions (Nigeria)	1–0	(Togo) Semassi FC

BCC Lions won 2–0 on aggregate.

25 March 1995

Costa do Sol (Mozambique)	1–0	(Mauritius) Fire Brigade SC

Fire Brigade won 3–1 on aggregate.

26 March 1995

Horoya AC (Guinea)	1–1	(Mali) Stade Malien

Stade Malien won 2–1 on aggregate.

26 March 1995

Obuasi Goldfields (Ghana)	8–1	(Liberia) NPA Anchors
Deblah 22', 24', 28', 76'; Hagan 7', 42', 86'; Boateng (?)	Report	Frank Taylor 54'

Len Clay Stadium, Obuasi

Obuasi Goldfields won 8–1 on aggregate.

26 March 1995

Simba SC (Tanzania)	1–1	(Zambia) Power Dynamos
Penalties
	4–3

2-2 on aggregate; Simba SC won on penalties.

26 March 1995

ASEC Mimosas (Ivory Coast)	3–1	(Angola) Petro Atlético

ASEC Mimosas won 5–2 on aggregate.

26 March 1995

Vita Club (Zaire)	4–2	(Gabon) Mbilinga FC

Mbilinga FC won 6–4 on aggregate.

26 March 1995

CD Travadores (Cape Verde)	0–0	(The Gambia) Real Banjul

Real Banjul won 1–0 on aggregate.

26 March 1995

Espérance de Tunis (Tunisia)	4–1	(Burkina Faso) Étoile Filante

ES Tunis won 5–2 on aggregate.

26 March 1995

Al-Hilal (Sudan)	0–1	(Zimbabwe) Dynamos FC

Dynamos FC won 2–0 on aggregate.

26 March 1995

Ismaily (Egypt)	1–0	(Burundi) Fantastique FC
El-Agouz 13'	Report

Ismaily won 2–0 on aggregate.

26 March 1995

Aigle Nkongsamba (Cameroon)	1–0	(Republic of the Congo) Étoile du Congo

3–3 on aggregate; Aigle won on away goals.

26 March 1995

JS Saint-Pierroise (Réunion)	4–0	Lesotho Defence Force FC

Saint-Pierroise won 6–2 on aggregate.

== Second round ==
Team 1	Agg.	Team 2	1st leg	2nd leg
ASEC Mimosas (Ivory Coast)	4–2	(Tanzania) Simba SC	2–1	2–1
BCC Lions (Nigeria)	1–2	(South Africa) Orlando Pirates	1–1	0–1
Real Banjul (The Gambia)	0–6	(Gabon) Mbilinga FC	0–2	0–4^{1}
Obuasi Goldfields (Ghana)	1–0	(Mali) Stade Malien	1–0	0–0
Espérance de Tunis (Tunisia)	4–0	(Mauritius) Fire Brigade SC	2–0	2–0
Ismaily (Egypt)	8–1	(Réunion) JS Saint-Pierroise	5–0	3–1
Dynamos FC (Zimbabwe)	4–3	(Algeria) US Chaouia	1–1	3–2
Express FC (Uganda)	3–1	(Cameroon) Aigle Nkongsamba	3–0	0–1

=== First leg ===
5 May 1995

Espérance Tunis (Tunisia)	2–0	(Mauritius) Fire Brigade SC

6 May 1995

Obuasi Goldfields (Ghana)	1–0	(Mali) Stade Malien
Tieku 5'	Report

Len Clay Stadium, Obuasi

6 May 1995

Express FC (Uganda)	3–0	(Cameroon) Aigle Nkongsamba

6 May 1995

Real Banjul (The Gambia)	2–0	(Gabon) Mbilinga FC

7 May 1995

Dynamos FC (Zimbabwe)	1–1	(Algeria) US Chaouia

7 May 1995

ASEC Mimosas (Ivory Coast)	2–1	(Tanzania) Simba SC

7 May 1995

BCC Lions (Nigeria)	1–1	(South Africa) Orlando Pirates
Madueme 2'		Ramokadi 73'

7 May 1995

Ismaily (Egypt)	5–0	(Réunion) JS Saint-Pierroise
Abougreisha 5' (pen.), 20'; El Sayyad 27'; Ragab 40'; Abdel Al 80'	Report

=== Second leg ===
19 May 1995

US Chaouia (Algeria)	2–3	(Zimbabwe) Dynamos FC
Mehdaoui 40', 41'		Toya 20'; Takaouare 55', 69'

Dynamos FC won 4–3 on aggregate.

21 May 1995

Fire Brigade SC (Mauritius)	0–2	(Tunisia) Espérance Tunis
		Gabsi 5'; Sichir 20'

ES Tunis won 4–0 on aggregate.

21 May 1995

Aigle Nkongsamba (Cameroon)	1–0	(Uganda) Express FC
Simo 19'

Express FC won 3–1 on aggregate.

21 May 1995

Mbilinga FC (Gabon)	4–0^{1}	(The Gambia) Real Banjul
Biyoghe 10'; Ondo 55' (pen.); Ogandaga 60', 70'

^{1}The match was abandoned at 70' with Mbilinga FC leading 4–0, after Real Banjul walked off the pitch to protest the officiating. Real Banjul were ejected from the competition and banned from CAF competitions for one year.

Mbilinga FC won 4–2 on aggregate.

21 May 1995

Simba SC (Tanzania)	1–2	(Ivory Coast) ASEC Mimosas

ASEC Mimosas won 4–2 on aggregate.

21 May 1995

Orlando Pirates (South Africa)	1–0	(Nigeria) BCC Lions
Silent 5'

Orlando Pirates won 2–1 on aggregate.

21 May 1995

JS Saint-Pierroise (Réunion)	1–3	(Egypt) Ismaily
Grondin 35'	Report	El-Agouz 20'; El-Sagheer 33'; Abdel Al 44'

Ismaily won 8–1 on aggregate.

11 June 1995

Stade Malien (Mali)	0–0	(Ghana) Obuasi Goldfields

Obuasi Goldfields won 1–0 on aggregate.

== Quarter-finals ==
Team 1	Agg.	Team 2	1st leg	2nd leg
Espérance de Tunis (Tunisia)	0–1	(Egypt) Ismaily	0–1	0–0
Obuasi Goldfields (Ghana)	0–2	(Ivory Coast) ASEC Mimosas	0–2	0–0
Mbilinga FC (Gabon)	2–4	(South Africa) Orlando Pirates	2–1	0–3
Express FC (Uganda)	2–2	(Zimbabwe) Dynamos FC	0–1	2–1

== Semi-finals ==
Team 1	Agg.	Team 2	1st leg	2nd leg
Ismaily (Egypt)	2–5	(Ivory Coast) ASEC Mimosas	1–0	1–5
Orlando Pirates (South Africa)	2–1	(Uganda) Express FC	1–0	1–1

== Final ==
2 December 1995
--:-- UTC+2

Orlando Pirates (South Africa)	2–2	(Ivory Coast) ASEC Mimosas
Mkhalele 5'; Lane 42'		Zaki 18'; Sié 31'

FNB Stadium, Johannesburg
16 December 1995
--:-- UTC+0

ASEC Mimosas (Ivory Coast)	0–1	(South Africa) Orlando Pirates
		Sikhosana 73'

Stade Félix Houphouët-Boigny, Abidjan

== Champion ==
1995 African Cup of Champions Clubs Winners
(South Africa)
Orlando Pirates
First title

== Top scorers ==
The top scorers from the 1995 African Cup of Champions Clubs are as follows:

Rank	Name	Team	Goals
1	(Ghana) Kofi Deblah	(Ghana) Obuasi Goldfields	4
1	(Ivory Coast) Sékou Bamba	(Ivory Coast) ASEC Mimosas	4
3	(Egypt) Mohamed Abo Greisha	(Egypt) Ismaily	3
3	(Egypt) Ahmed El Agouz	(Egypt) Ismaily	3
3	(Ghana) Ebenezer Hagan	(Ghana) Obuasi Goldfields	3
3	(South Africa) Gavin Lane	(South Africa) Orlando Pirates	3
3	(South Africa) Bruce Ramokadi	(South Africa) Orlando Pirates	3
3	(South Africa) Jerry Sikhosana	(South Africa) Orlando Pirates	3
9	(Egypt) Essam Abdel Aal	(Egypt) Ismaily	2
9	(Egypt) Magdy El Sayed	(Egypt) Ismaily	2
9	(South Africa) Marks Maponyane	(South Africa) Orlando Pirates	2
9	(South Africa) Helman Mkhalele	(South Africa) Orlando Pirates	2
9	(South Africa) Brandon Silent	(South Africa) Orlando Pirates	2
