= Irvin Khoza =

South African association football administrator (born 1948)

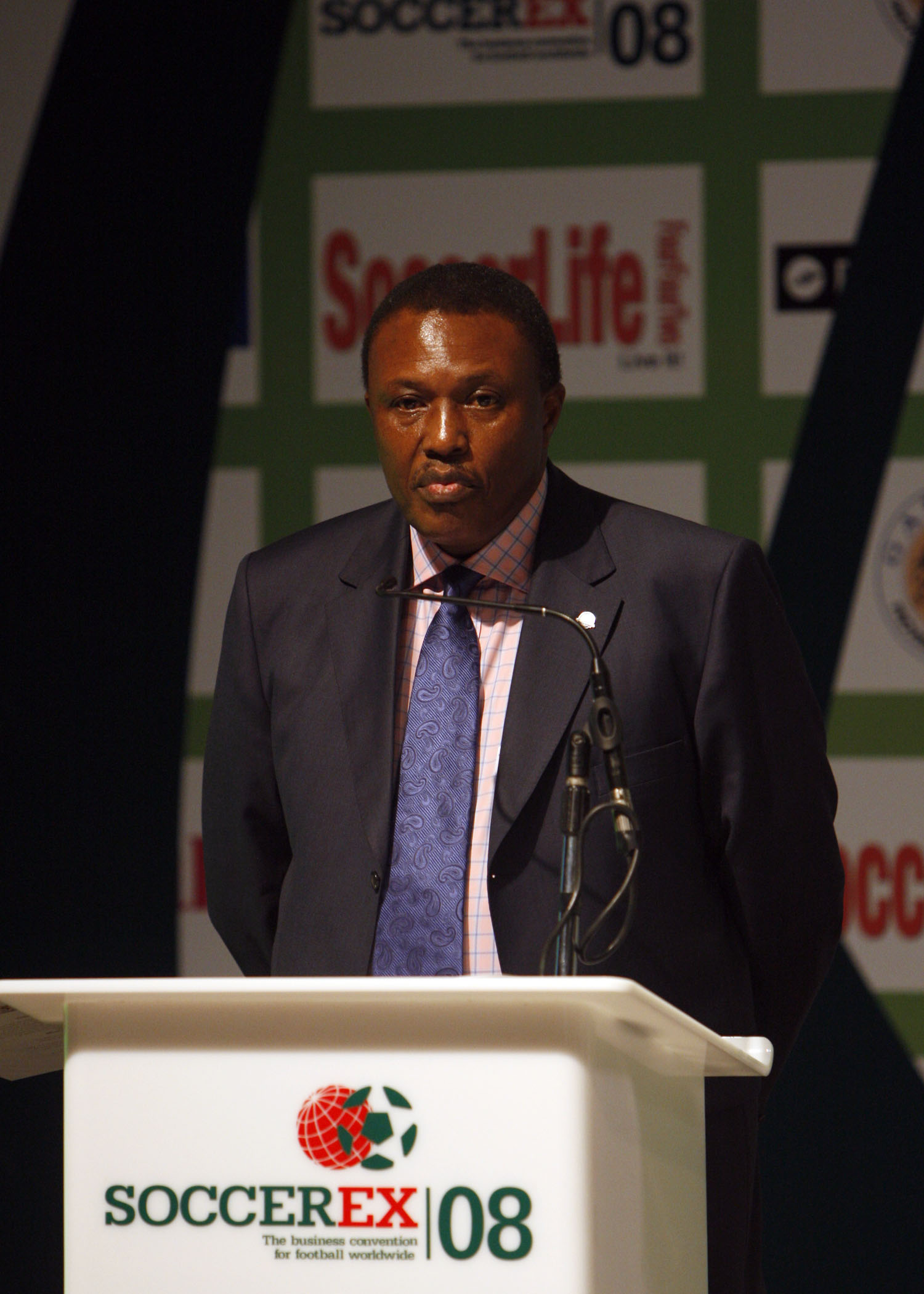
- Irvin Khoza in 2008
- Born: Irvin Khoza; 27 January 1948 (age 78); Alexandra, South Africa
- Occupations: Chairman of Orlando Pirates Football Club, Chairman of the Premier Soccer League, Vice-President of the South African Football Association

Dr Irvin Khoza OIS (born 27 January 1948) is a South African football administrator and businessman. Nicknamed "Iron Duke / "MadalaGufets", he is the Chairman of Orlando Pirates Football Club, Chairman of the South African Premier Soccer League and by virtue of this, Vice-President of the South African Football Association. His relationship with Orlando Pirates started in 1980, when he became its secretary and owner in 1991. As the Chairman of the Premier Soccer League, he was instrumental in securing the current sponsors of the league, DStv. He was also the Chairman of the 2010 FIFA World Cup Organising Committee South Africa, after serving as the Chairman of South Africa's 2010 FIFA World Cup bid.

Khoza was part of the team who secured the right to host the 2010 FIFA World Cup in South Africa and later became the chairman of the South African Organising Committee. At the announcement of South Africa's success, Khoza said that "This is the people of the world voting for Africa's renewal."

== Personal life ==
Irvin Khoza was married to two wives: the late Yvonne Mantwa Kgotleng-Khoza who died on 17 January 2020. They have three children, two sons and daughter Sonono Khoza who has a child with former South African president, Jacob Zuma.

The other wife is the late Matina Khoza who died on 23 July 2020. They have four children, two sons and two daughters: Sonono, the late Zodwa, Nkosana and Mpumi.
