= John Zaki =

Nigerian footballer (1973–2014)

Personal information
- Full name: John Zakari
- Date of birth: 10 July 1973
- Place of birth: Nigeria
- Date of death: 27 November 2014 (aged 41)
- Place of death: Nigeria
- Position: Striker

Senior career*
| Years | Team | Apps | (Gls) |
| 1991–1994 | BCC Lions | | |
| 1995 | ASEC Mimosas | | (9) |
| 1995–1996 | Al Hilal | | |
| 1996–1998 | ASEC Mimosas | | |
| 2000 | Jeonbuk Hyundai Motors | 1 | (0) |

International career
| 1995 | Nigeria | 2 | (0) |
- * Club domestic league appearances and goals

John Zakari (10 July 1973 – 17 November 2014), commonly known as John Zaki, was a Nigerian professional footballer who played as a striker.

== Club career ==
In April 2000, Zaki joined South Korean side Jeonbuk Hyundai Motors.

== Death ==
Zaki died on 27 November 2014.

== Honours ==
BCC Lions

- Nigerian Premier League: 1994
- Nigeria FA Cup: 1993, 1994

ASEC Mimosas

- Ivory Coast Ligue 1: 1995, 1997, 1998
- Coupe de Côte d'Ivoire: 1995, 1997

Al Hilal

- Saudi Premier League: 1995–96
- Saudi Federation Cup: 1995–96
- Arab Club Champions Cup: 1995
- Arab Super Cup: 1995

Individual

- Ivory Coast Ligue 1 top goalscorer: 1995
