= Komlan Assignon =

Togolese footballer (born 1974)

Personal information
- Full name: Komlan Agbeko Assignon
- Date of birth: 21 January 1974 (age 52)
- Height: 1.82 m (6 ft 0 in)
- Position: Midfielder

Senior career*
Years	Team	Apps	(Gls)
1991–1996	AS Cannes B		
1996–2000	AS Cannes		
1997–1998	→ AS Cannes B (loan)		
2000–2001	AS Beauvais Oise		
2001–2002	US Créteil		
2002–2003	Stade Poitevin		
2003–2004	Al-Jahra SC		

International career
1997–2002	Togo	20	(4)
- * Club domestic league appearances and goals

Komlan Agbeko Assignon (born 21 January 1974) is a Togolese former professional footballer who played as a midfielder.

Assignon played with a number of French clubs, including AS Cannes, AS Beauvais Oise and US Créteil-Lusitanos. His final year of play was with Al Jahra in Kuwait.

Assignon capped for the Togo national team at the 1998, 2000 and 2002 African Cup of Nations. In total he got 20 caps and four goals.

He acquired French nationality by naturalization on 7 June 1996.

== Personal life ==
Assignon's son, Lorenz, is a professional footballer who plays for Stuttgart.

== Career statistics ==
=== International ===
Scores and results list Togo's goal tally first, score column indicates score after each Assignon goal.

List of international goals scored by Komlan Assignon
No.	Date	Venue	Opponent	Score	Result	Competition
1	26 January 1997	Accra Sports Stadium, Accra, Ghana	Liberia	2–1	2–1	1998 Africa Cup of Nations qualification
2	13 July 1997	Stade Municipal, Lomé, Togo	Liberia	3–0	4–0	1998 Africa Cup of Nations qualification
3	16 February 1998	Stade Municipal, Ouagadougou, Burkina Faso	Tunisia	1–0	1–3	1998 Africa Cup of Nations
4	6 May 2001	Stade de Kégué, Lomé, Togo	Zambia	1–1	3–2	2002 FIFA World Cup qualification
