= Brandon Silent =

South African soccer player

Personal information
- Date of birth: 22 January 1973 (age 53)
- Position: Midfielder

Youth career
- Vaal Reef Stars

Senior career*
Years	Team	Apps	(Gls)
1993–2001	Orlando Pirates	255	(21)

International career
1994–1996	South Africa U23	9	(0)
1997–1998	South Africa	5	(0)
- * Club domestic league appearances and goals

Brandon Silent (born 22 January 1973) is a South African former soccer player who played at both professional and international levels as a right-sided midfielder and fullback.

He was nicknamed "Sgcebezana" (Homunculus) because of his short stature.

== Career ==
Silent played club football for Orlando Pirates, scoring 22 goals in 270 appearances.

Silent also earned five caps for the South African national side between 1997 and 1998. He played for South Africa at the 1998 African Cup of Nations finals.

After he retired from playing in 2003, Silent became a football coach. He has worked as an assistant at FC AK.
