= Noel Kipre =

Ivorian footballer

Personal information
- Full name: Noel Dodo Kipre
- Date of birth: 4 September 1972 (age 54)
- Place of birth: Ivory Coast
- Height: 1.80 m (5 ft 11 in)
- Position: Striker

Senior career*
Years	Team	Apps	(Gls)
1990–1997	Perak FA	77	(45)
1998–1999	FC Energie Cottbus	6	(0)
1999	SV Babelsberg 03	13	(2)
1999–2004	Wuppertaler SV	115	(35)
2004–2005	Wuppertaler SV II	21	(5)
2006	FC Wülfrath		

International career
1996	Ivory Coast	5	(0)
- * Club domestic league appearances and goals

Noel Dodo Kipre (born 9 April 1972) is an Ivorian former footballer.

Kipra formerly played with Perak FA in Malaysia. He only had a short stint in Malaysia football league. He then played for FC Energie Cottbus in 2. Bundesliga, SV Babelsberg 03 in the Regionalliga Nordost and later for Wuppertaler SV in Regionalliga Nord.

He made five appearances for the Ivory Coast national football team, including playing in the 1998 FIFA World Cup qualifying rounds.
