= Yao Mawuko Sènaya =

Togolese footballer

Yao Sènaya
Personal information
- Full name: Yao Mawuko Sènaya
- Date of birth: 18 October 1979 (age 47)
- Place of birth: Lomé, Togo
- Height: 1.72 m (5 ft 8 in)
- Position: Midfielder

Senior career*
Years	Team	Apps	(Gls)
1996–1998	Cannes B	35	(3)
1996–1998	Cannes	24	(0)
1998–1999	Toulouse B	6	(0)
1999–2000	Red Star Saint-Ouen	7	(0)
2000–2001	Wangen bei Olten	12	(0)
2001–2002	Grenchen	22	(7)
2002	Biel-Bienne	15	(6)
2003–2004	Grenchen	26	(3)
2004	Wohlen	3	(0)
2005	Alle	9	(0)
2005–2007	Young Fellows Juventus	46	(0)
2007–2008	La Chaux-de-Fonds	11	(0)
2009	Gomido		
2009–2010	Saint-Louis Neuweg	11	(0)

International career
1998–2008	Togo	26	(0)
- * Club domestic league appearances and goals

Yao Mawuko Sènaya (born 18 October 1979) is a Togolese former professional footballer who played as a midfielder. He made 20 appearances for the Togo national team between 1998 and 2008.

He was released by La Chaux-de-Fonds in the summer of 2008.

== Personal life ==
Sènaya was born in Lomé. He is the older brother of the Yao Junior Sènaya, and the father of Marvin Senaya, both professional footballers.
