= Donald-Olivier Sié =

Ivorian footballer (born 1970)

Personal information
- Date of birth: 3 April 1970 (age 56)
- Place of birth: Abidjan, Ivory Coast
- Height: 1.75 m (5 ft 9 in)
- Position: Midfielder

Youth career
- ASEC Mimosas

Senior career*
Years	Team	Apps	(Gls)
1989–1996	ASEC Mimosas		
1996	Nagoya Grampus Eight	16	(1)
1997–1998	ASEC Mimosas		
1998–1999	Toulouse	10	(1)
1999–2000	Racing Paris	20	(3)
2000–2001	Reims	16	(1)
2001–2010	JS Cugnaux		

International career
1990–2000	Ivory Coast	42	(6)
- * Club domestic league appearances and goals

Donald-Olivier Sié (born 3 April 1970) is an Ivorian former professional footballer who played as a midfielder. He participated at the 1992, 1994, 1996, 1998 and 2000 Africa Cup of Nations.

He played for Toulouse FC in Ligue 1. (Note: Donald-Olivier Sié – French league stats at LFP – also available in French (archived)) He later played for lower-league side JS Cugnaux.

Sié acquired French nationality by naturalization on 27 July 2005.

== Career statistics ==
=== Club ===
Appearances and goals by club, season and competition
Club	Season	League			National Cup		League Cup		Total	
Club	Season	Division	Apps	Goals	Apps	Goals	Apps	Goals	Apps	Goals
Nagoya Grampus Eight	1996	J1 League	16	1	1	0	2	0	19	1
Toulouse	1998–99	Ligue 1	10	1	0	0	1	0	11	1
RCF Paris	1999–2000	Championnat National	20	3					20	3
Reims	2000–01	Championnat National	16	1					16	1
Total			62	6	1	0	3	0	66	6

=== International ===
Appearances and goals by national team and year
National team	Year	Apps	Goals
Ivory Coast	1990	1	1
Ivory Coast	1991	3	1
Ivory Coast	1992	5	2
Ivory Coast	1993	7	0
Ivory Coast	1994	13	1
Ivory Coast	1995	4	0
Ivory Coast	1996	3	0
Ivory Coast	1997	1	0
Ivory Coast	1998	6	0
Ivory Coast	1999	4	0
Ivory Coast	2000	4	1
Total		51	6

== Honours ==
Ivory Coast

- African Cup of Nations: 1992
