= ASEC Mimosas =

Ivorian football club

- Full name: Association Sportive des Employés de Commerce Mimosas
- Nicknames: Les Mimos (The Mimos); Les Jaunes et Noirs (The Yellow and Blacks)
- Founded: 29 April 1948; 78 years ago
- Ground: Robert Champroux Stadium
- Capacity: 10,000
- Chairman: Cédric Kouamé
- Manager: Julien Chevalier
- League: Ligue 1
- 2025–26: Ligue 1, Champions of 16
- Website: www.asec.ci
| Home colours | Away colours |

ASEC Mimosas (short for Association Sportive des Employés de Commerce Mimosas; lit. 'Mimosas Commerce Employees' Sporting Association') is an Ivorian professional football club based in Abidjan. The club is also known as ASEC Abidjan, especially in international club competitions. Founded in 1948, they are the most successful side in Ivorian football, having won the Ivorian Premier Division 30 times and the 1998 CAF Champions League. In addition, ASEC's youth academy, known as Académie MimoSifcom, has produced a number of famous players predominantly based in top foreign leagues, including Bonaventure Kalou, Didier Zokora, Emmanuel Eboué, Bakari Koné, Gervinho, Salomon Kalou, Romaric, Boubacar Barry, Didier Ya Konan, Kolo Touré, Yaya Touré and Odilon Kossounou, all of whom have played internationally.

== History ==
ASEC Mimosas was founded on 29 April 1948 by a group of businessmen from Western Africa, Lebanon and France. The club originates from a place called Sol-béni (French for Holy Ground) in Abidjan-M'pouto, which today is the name of their training complex. In the following years, ASEC competed in the Championship of Abidjan together with their eternal rival Africa Sports, with their first professional coach being Frenchman Guy Fabre in 1954. Fabre also shaped the club's philosophy of que les enfants s'amusent... en jouant au football (may the children have fun... by playing football).

After Independence in 1960, ASEC won its first title in the newly found Premier Division in 1963. In the early 1970s, ASEC rose to power by winning the league title 5 out of 6 possible times from 1970 to 1975. This was the era of players as Laurent Pokou and Eustache Manglé. In the next years, it was Africa Sports who dominated the league, with ASEC winning only once in 1980.

On 19 November 1989, advocate Roger Ouégnin was elected as club president. In his wish to professionalize the club, he introduced Philippe Troussier as coach from 1989 until 1992. This was the time for ASEC to return to old strength, winning the championship six consecutive times between 1990 and 1995. ASEC also provided the backbone of the national team that won the 1992 African Cup of Nations, including key members of the side such as Ben Badi, Donald-Olivier Sié and Basile Aka Kouamé. After having qualified for the semi-finals already five times before, ASEC finally won the CAF Champions League in 1998. For some players, this was the chance to sign for a European club, for example team captain Tchiressoua Guel, who joined Olympique de Marseille afterwards. A few years later, ASEC beat their own record by winning the league seven consecutive times between 2000 and 2006.

In 1993, former French national player Jean-Marc Guillou joined the club staff as director, manager and financier. Together with chairman Roger Ouégnin, he founded the Académie MimoSifcom at Sol Béni. In the following weeks, they started to scout amongst thousands of young kids to form the first promotions to receive coaching and education. In 1999, following ASECs success in the 1998 Champions League, ASEC faced Espérance Sportive de Tunis in the CAF Super Cup. But most of the old players were aged, had left the club or at least wanted to. So Guillou and Ouégnin decided to replace the old squad with the first products of the academy, most of them only aged around 17/18 years. The owners protested against this measure and Espérance's president Slim Chiboub called it a "scandal to be playing against children". However, the young ASEC squad surprisingly beat their opponents by 3 to 1 goals and brought in the second big international title for their club. Amongst others, Boubacar 'Copa' Barry, Kolo Touré, Didier Zokora, Gilles Yapi Yapo, Siaka Tiéné, Abdoulaye Djire, Venance Zézé, and Aruna Dindane were part of that squad. When Guillou became manager of Belgian side K.S.K. Beveren in 2001, many of the academy's players joined him. As a result, the Belgian team consisted mainly out of Ivorian players for several years. These could use Beveren as a chance to show their talent to top European clubs. Players as Yaya Touré, Arthur Boka, Emmanuel Eboué, Gervinho, Romaric and Copa all had their time in Beveren. This lasted until 2006, when Guillou and Beveren broke up with ASEC Mimosas. ASEC then linked up with Charlton Athletic.

== Satellite clubs ==
The following clubs are affiliated with ASEC:

- (England) Charlton Athletic
- (Ghana) West African Football Academy

== Académie MimoSifcom ==
ASECs youth academy has been described as the crown jewel of African football. The academy started by Roger Ouégnin and Jean-Marc Guillou in 1993 at ASEC's training complex has since produced many international stars. The student-athletes are given an education, for which they take classes in math, history, geography, physics, French, English, and Spanish. The students live in dorms during the week and have two training sessions a day. They play matches on Saturday and get health care and tutoring.

== Current squad ==
As of 30 December 2022

Note: Flags indicate national team as defined under FIFA eligibility rules; some limited exceptions apply. Players may hold more than one non-FIFA nationality.

| No. | Pos. | Nation | Player |
|---|---|---|---|
| 1 | GK | CIV | Amine Diakite |
| 2 | DF | CIV | Mohamed Ali Yabré |
| 3 | DF | CIV | Beugré Martin Gbakré |
| 4 | DF | CIV | Abdoul Yvann Diallo |
| 7 | MF | CIV | Armand Dagrou |
| 8 | MF | CIV | Hassan Aziz Sanogo |
| 9 | FW | CIV | Célestin Ecua |
| 10 | FW | BFA | Salifou Diarrassouba |
| 11 | MF | CIV | Josphat Arthur Bada |
| 12 | MF | CIV | Seydou Sacko |
| 13 | DF | CIV | Bi Anthony Tra |
| 14 | MF | CIV | Kamara Cheick Issouf |
| 15 | MF | CIV | Koffi Dakoi |
| 16 | GK | CIV | Ruben Yelo |
| 17 | FW | CIV | Nadrey Dago |
| 19 | MF | CIV | Essis Aka |

| No. | Pos. | Nation | Player |
|---|---|---|---|
| 20 | FW | CIV | Diby Béranger Gautier |
| 21 | GK | CIV | Charles Folly Ayayi |
| 22 | MF | CIV | Romaric Amoussou |
| 23 | FW | CIV | Razack Cissé |
| 24 | DF | CIV | Romeo Kouame |
| 25 | MF | TOG | Youssifou Atté |
| 26 | DF | CIV | Franck Zouzou |
| 27 | FW | CIV | Thierry Kassi |
| 28 | DF | CIV | Ibrahim Doumbia |
| 30 | DF | CIV | Salif Coulibaly |
| 31 | DF | CIV | Bazoumana Toure |
| 32 | DF | CIV | Bi Kader Yameogo |
| 33 | MF | CIV | Abdoul Fatahou Ouattara |
| 34 | MF | CIV | Tidiane Malick Siaka |
| 35 | DF | CIV | Ibrahim Diakité |

=== Technical staff ===
| (France) Julien Chevalier | Manager |
| (Ivory Coast) Felix Kouadjo | Assistant coach |
| (Ivory Coast) Fabrice Jocelyn N'Guessan | Assistant coach |
| (Ivory Coast) Alama Bada Soumahoro | Assistant coach |
| (Ivory Coast) Akassou Koutouan | Recruitment Cell |
| (Ivory Coast) Dr. Yves Kouamé | Senior Physician |
| (Ivory Coast) Randriatsiderana Zaka | Physiotherapist |
| (Ivory Coast) Christian Boua Gbizie | Physiotherapist |
| (Ivory Coast) Patrick Martial Adou | Physiotherapist |
| (Ivory Coast) Kore Stone Logbo | Caregiver |
| (Ivory Coast) Patrice Volibi | Masseur |
| (Ivory Coast) Samake Siaka | General Steward |

== Club life ==
The club's colours are yellow and black; the badge displays a Mimosa. Together with their biggest rival Africa Sports National, they contest the most important ivorian football derby. These two are also the only clubs allowed to play their home games in Stade Félix Houphouët-Boigny.

ASEC has, after own declarations, more than 8,000,000 fans in Ivory Coast and 15,000,000 in the whole region. The fans are called the Actionnaires. They are organised in the CNACO (Comité National d`Action et de Coordination, = National Committee for Action and Coordination), which has 40,000 members and consists out of 350 commissions.

== Honours ==
=== Domestic ===
- Côte d'Ivoire Premier Division: 30
  - 1963, 1970, 1972, 1973, 1974, 1975, 1980, 1990, 1991, 1992, 1993, 1994, 1995, 1997, 1998, 2000, 2001, 2002, 2003, 2004, 2005, 2006, 2009, 2010, 2017, 2018, 2021, 2022, 2023, 2026
- Côte d'Ivoire Cup: 22
  - 1957, 1962, 1967, 1968, 1969, 1970, 1972, 1973, 1983, 1990, 1995, 1997, 1999, 2003, 2005, 2007, 2008, 2011, 2013, 2014, 2018, 2023
- Félix Houphouët-Boigny Cup: 17
  - 1975, 1980, 1983, 1990, 1994, 1995, 1997, 1998, 1999, 2004, 2006, 2007, 2008, 2009, 2011, 2017, 2023

=== International ===
- CAF Champions League: 1
  - 1998
- CAF Super Cup: 1
  - 1999
- West African Club Championship (UFOA Cup): 1
  - 1990
- Peace Cup: 1
  - 2001

== Performance in CAF competitions ==
- CAF Champions League: 20 appearances

1998 – Winners
1999 – Group stage
2001 – Group stage
2002 – Semi-finals
2003 – Group stage
2004 – semi finals
2005 – Group stage

2006 – Semi-finals
2007 – Group stage
2008 – Group stage
2009 – Second round
2010 – First round
2011 – Second round
2016 – Group stage

2018 – First round
2018–19 – Group stage
2021–22 – Second round
2022–23 – Second round
2023–24 – Quarter Finals
2025–26 – First round
2026–27 – TBD

- African Cup of Champions Clubs: 12 appearances

1964 – Preliminary round
1971 – Semi-finals
1973 – Second round
1974 – Quarter-finals

1975 – Quarter-finals
1976 – Semi-finals
1981 – Quarter-finals
1991 – Quarter-finals

1992 – Semi-finals
1993 – Semi-finals
1995 – Finalist
1996 – Second round

- CAF Confederation Cup: 9 appearances

2009 – Second round of 16
2011 – Group stage (Top 8)
2012 – Second round
2013 – Second round
2014 – Group stage (Top 8)

2015 – Second round of 16
2017 – Second round of 16
2018 – Group stage (Top 16)
2021-2022 – Group stage (Top 16)
2022-2023 – Semi-finals

- CAF Cup Winners' Cup: 4 appearances

1983 – Semi-finals
1984 – Quarter-finals
1987 – Second round
2000 – First round

== Former managers ==
- (Ivory Coast) Tronnou Seho (1947–50)
- (Ivory Coast) Domingo Koffi (1950–53)
- (France) Guy Fabre (1954–59)
- (Ivory Coast) Bakary Touré (1960–62)
- (Ivory Coast) Koffi Faustin (1962–65)
- (Ivory Coast) Ignace Wognin (1966–69)
- (Ivory Coast) André Sokoury (1969–70)
- (Ivory Coast) Gérard Gabo (1970–71)
- (Ivory Coast) Orlando (1971–72)
- (Ivory Coast) Jean-Baptiste Anzian (1972–75)
- (Ivory Coast) Yobouët Konan (1975–76)

- (Ivory Coast) Ignace Wognin (1976–78)
- (Ivory Coast) Bernard Vinc (1978–79)
- (France) Guy Fabre (1979–80)
- (Ivory Coast) Assane (1981–84)
- (Ivory Coast) Gérard Gabo (1984–86)
- (Burkina Faso) Drissa "Saboteur" Traoré (1986–87)
- (Belgium) Phillipe Garot (1987–89)
- (France) Philippe Troussier (1990–92)
- (Ivory Coast) Eustache Manglé (1992–93)
- (Switzerland) Charles Roessli (1993–94)
- (Ivory Coast) Mamadou Zaré (1994–95)

- (Ivory Coast) Yobouët Konan (1995–96)
- (Argentina) Oscar Fulloné (1996–98)
- (France) Jean-Marc Guillou (1998–99)
- (Switzerland) Michel Decastel (1999–01)
- (Burkina Faso) Drissa "Saboteur" Traoré (2001–02)
- (Ivory Coast) Basile Aka Kouamé (2002–03)
- (France) Patrick Liewig (2003–09)
- (Ivory Coast) Maxime Gouaméné (2009–10)
- (France) Sébastien Desabre (2010–12)

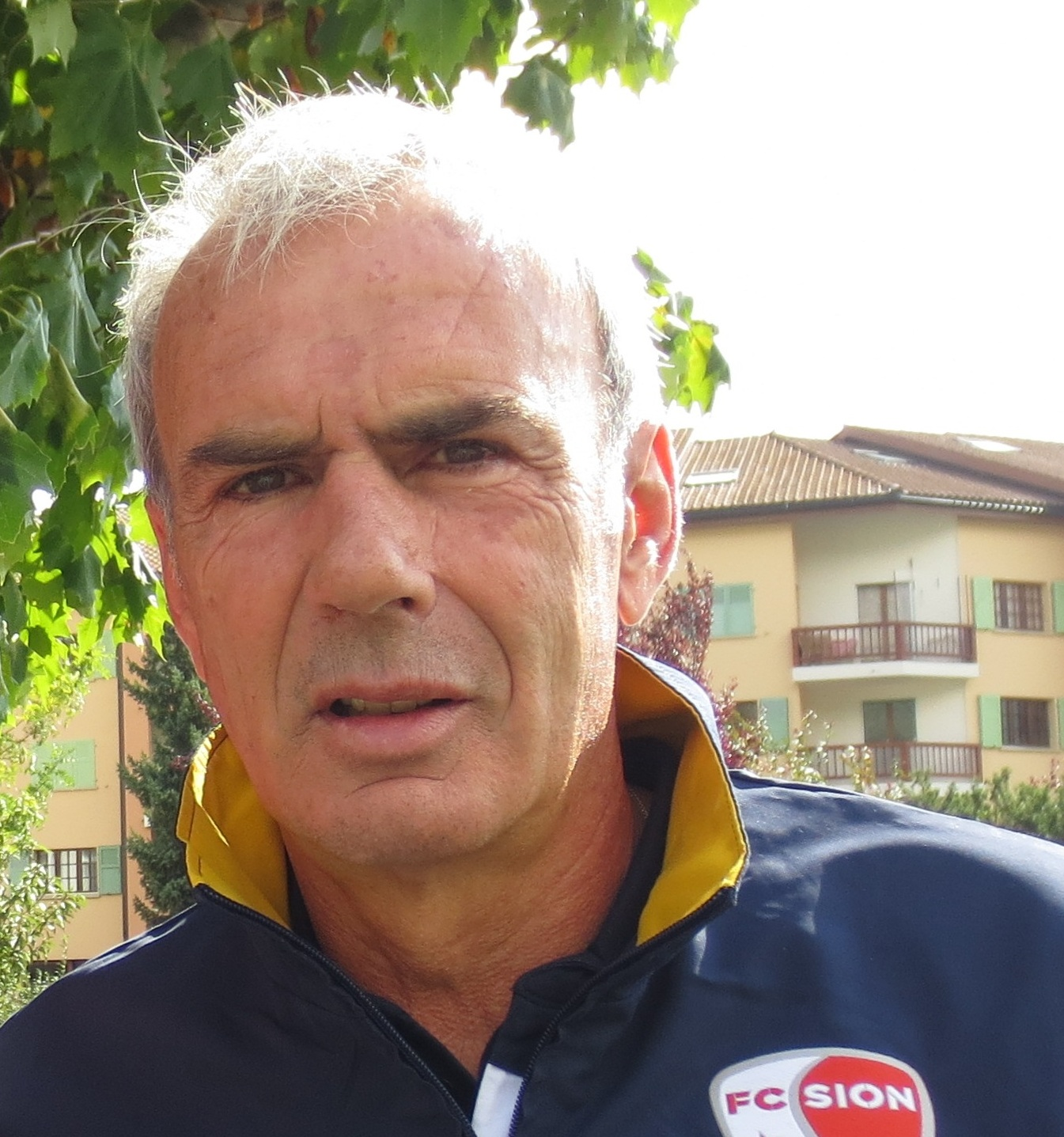
Michel Decastel became the manager of ASEC

== Former presidents ==
- (Ivory Coast) Joseph Kouamelan (1948–50)
- (Ivory Coast) Tronnou Seho (1950–51)
- (Ivory Coast) Lucien Dogbo (1951–53)
- (Ivory Coast) François Logon (1953–54)
- (Ivory Coast) Louis Boah (1954–56)
- (Ivory Coast) François Ouégnin (1958–60)
- (Ivory Coast) Blé Kouadio M'Bahia (1960–64)
- (Ivory Coast) Kata François Kamano (1964–68)
- (Ivory Coast) Mamadou Kouyaté (1968–70)

- (Ivory Coast) Lanzéni Coulibaly (1970–75)
- (Ivory Coast) Emile Dervain (1975–77)
- (Ivory Coast) Bogui Bégnana (1977–79)
- (Ivory Coast) Mamadou Touré (1979–80)
- (Ivory Coast) Victor Ekra (1980–81)
- (Ivory Coast) Claude Andoh (1981–83)
- (Ivory Coast) Mamadou Touré (1983–87)
- (Ivory Coast) Kangah Michel Ahoua (1987–89)
- (Ivory Coast) Roger Ouégnin (1989–)
