= List of acts of the Parliament of South Africa, 2000–2009 =

This is a list of acts of the Parliament of South Africa enacted in the years 2000 to 2009.

South African acts are uniquely identified by the year of passage and an act number within that year. Some acts have gone by more than one short title in the course of their existence; in such cases each title is listed with the years in which it applied.

== 2000 ==
| Act no. | Short title |
|---|---|
| 1 | Pharmacy Amendment Act, 2000 |
| 2 | Promotion of Access to Information Act, 2000 |
| 3 | Promotion of Administrative Justice Act, 2000 |
| 4 | Promotion of Equality and Prevention of Unfair Discrimination Act, 2000 |
| 5 | Preferential Procurement Policy Framework Act, 2000 |
| 6 | Chiropractors, Homeopaths and Allied Health Service Professions Amendment Act, 2000 |
| 7 | South African Airways Unallocatable Debt Act, 2000 |
| 8 | Tourism Amendment Act, 2000 |
| 9 | Remuneration of Public Office Bearers Amendment Act, 2000 |
| 10 | Lotteries Amendment Act, 2000 |
| 11 | Land Affairs General Amendment Act, 2000 |
| 12 | Financial Services Board Amendment Act, 2000 |
| 13 | Independent Communications Authority of South Africa Act, 2000 |
| 14 | Fire Brigade Services Amendment Act, 2000 |
| 15 | Competition Amendment Act, 2000 |
| 16 | Division of Revenue Act, 2000 |
| 17 | Nonprofit Organisations Amendment Act, 2000 |
| 18 | Road Accident Fund Commission Amendment Act, 2000 |
| 19 | National Youth Commission Amendment Act, 2000 |
| 20 | National House of Traditional Leaders Amendment Act, 2000 |
| 21 | Remuneration of Public Office Bearers Second Amendment Act, 2000 |
| 22 | National Land Transport Transition Act, 2000 |
| 23 | Appropriation Act, 2000 |
| 24 | Administrative Adjudication of Road Traffic Offences Amendment Act, 2000 |
| 25 | Road Traffic Management Corporation Amendment Act, 2000 |
| 26 | Protected Disclosures Act, 2000 |
| 27 | Local Government: Municipal Electoral Act, 2000 |
| 28 | Identification Amendment Act, 2000 |
| 29 | Local Government: Cross-boundary Municipalities Act, 2000 |
| 30 | Taxation Laws Amendment Act, 2000 |
| 31 | South African Council for Educators Act, 2000 |
| 32 | Local Government: Municipal Systems Act, 2000 |
| 33 | Local Government: Municipal Structures Amendment Act, 2000 |
| 34 | Adjustments Appropriation Act, 2000 |
| 35 | Finance Act, 2000 |
| 36 | Banks Amendment Act, 2000 |
| 37 | National Health Laboratory Service Act, 2000 |
| 38 | Construction Industry Development Board Act, 2000 |
| 39 | Competition Second Amendment Act, 2000 |
| 40 | Meat Safety Act, 2000 |
| 41 | Transnet Pension Fund Amendment Act, 2000 |
| 42 | Cross-Border Insolvency Act, 2000 |
| 43 | Council for the Built Environment Act, 2000 |
| 44 | Architectural Profession Act, 2000 |
| 45 | Landscape Architectural Profession Act, 2000 |
| 46 | Engineering Profession Act, 2000 |
| 47 | Property Valuers Profession Act, 2000 |
| 48 | Project and Construction Management Professions Act, 2000 |
| 49 | Quantity Surveying Profession Act, 2000 |
| 50 | Chiropractors, Homeopaths and Allied Health Service Professions Second Amendment Act, 2000 |
| 51 | African Renaissance and International Co-operation Fund Act, 2000 |
| 52 | Adult Basic Education and Training Act, 2000 |
| 53 | Education Laws Amendment Act, 2000 |
| 54 | Higher Education Amendment Act, 2000 |
| 55 | Second Adjustments Appropriation Act, 2000 |
| 56 | Bills of Exchange Amendment Act, 2000 |
| 57 | South African Reserve Bank Amendment Act, 2000 |
| 58 | Council for Medical Schemes Levies Act, 2000 |
| 59 | Revenue Laws Amendment Act, 2000 |
| 60 | Firearms Control Act, 2000 |
| 61 | National Prosecuting Authority Amendment Act, 2000 |
| 62 | Judicial Matters Amendment Act, 2000 |
| 63 | Home Loan and Mortgage Disclosure Act, 2000 |
| 64 | South African Rail Commuter Corporation Limited Financial Arrangements Act, 2000 |
| 65 | Sea Transport Documents Act, 2000 |
| 66 | General Intelligence Law Amendment Act, 2000 |
| 67 | Abolition of Lebowa Mineral Trust Act, 2000 |
| 68 | Marine Living Resources Amendment Act, 2000 |
| 69 | Re-determination of the Boundaries of Cross-boundary Municipalities Act, 2000 |
| 70 | Tourism Second Amendment Act, 2000 |

== 2001 ==
| Act no. | Short title |
|---|---|
| | Constitution of the Republic of South Africa Amendment Act, 2001 (before 2005); Constitution Sixth Amendment Act of 2001 (after 2005) |
| | Constitution of the Republic of South Africa Second Amendment Act, 2001 (before 2005); Constitution Seventh Amendment Act of 2001 (after 2005) |
| 1 | Division of Revenue Act, 2001 |
| 2 | Special Investigating Units and Special Tribunals Amendment Act, 2001 |
| 3 | Advisory Board on Social Development Act, 2001 |
| 4 | Housing Amendment Act, 2001 |
| 5 | Taxation Laws Amendment Act, 2001 |
| 6 | National Council for Library and Information Services Act, 2001 |
| 7 | South African Sports Commission Amendment Act, 2001 |
| 8 | South African Weather Service Act, 2001 |
| 9 | Export Credit and Foreign Investments Re-insurance Amendment Act, 2001 |
| 10 | Patents Amendment Act, 2001 |
| 11 | South African Boxing Act, 2001 |
| 12 | National Forest and Fire Laws Amendment Act, 2001 |
| 13 | Eskom Conversion Act, 2001 |
| 14 | Airports Company Amendment Act, 2001 |
| 15 | Road Accident Fund Amendment Act, 2001 |
| 16 | Supreme Court Decree, 1990 (Ciskei) Amendment Act, 2001 |
| 17 | Criminal Procedure Amendment Act, 2001 |
| 18 | Appropriation Act, 2001 |
| 19 | Revenue Laws Amendment Act, 2001 |
| 20 | Administration of Estates Laws Interim Rationalisation Act, 2001 |
| 21 | Consumer Affairs (Unfair Business Practices) Amendment Act, 2001 |
| 22 | Close Corporations Amendment Act, 2001 |
| 23 | Higher Education Amendment Act, 2001 |
| 24 | National Health Laboratory Service Amendment Act, 2001 |
| 25 | Counterfeit Goods Amendment Act, 2001 |
| 26 | Trade Practices Amendment Act, 2001 |
| 27 | Agricultural Research Amendment Act, 2001 |
| 28 | Financial Institutions (Protection of Funds) Act, 2001 |
| 29 | Alexkor Limited Amendment Act, 2001 |
| 30 | Repeal of Volkstaat Council Provisions Act, 2001 |
| 31 | National Land Transport Transition Amendment Act, 2001 |
| 32 | Correctional Services Amendment Act, 2001 |
| 33 | Postal Services Amendment Act, 2001 |
| 34 | Act number originally assigned to the Constitution Sixth Amendment Act |
| 35 | Companies Amendment Act, 2001 |
| 36 | Cultural Laws Amendment Act, 2001 |
| 37 | Diplomatic Immunities and Privileges Act, 2001 |
| 38 | Financial Intelligence Centre Act, 2001 |
| 39 | Pension Funds Second Amendment Act, 2001 |
| 40 | Stock Exchanges Control Amendment Act, 2001 |
| 41 | Interim Rationalisation of Jurisdiction of High Courts Act, 2001 |
| 42 | Judicial Matters Amendment Act, 2001 |
| 43 | Demobilisation Amendment Act, 2001 |
| 44 | Termination of Integration Intake Act, 2001 |
| 45 | Agricultural Debt Management Act, 2001 |
| 46 | Lotteries Amendment Act, 2001 |
| 47 | Judges' Remuneration and Conditions of Employment Act, 2001 |
| 48 | Gas Act, 2001 |
| 49 | Industrial Development Amendment Act, 2001 |
| 50 | Merchandise Marks Amendment Act, 2001 |
| 51 | Land Affairs General Amendment Act, 2001 |
| 52 | Marketing of Agricultural Products Amendment Act, 2001 |
| 53 | Provincial Tax Regulation Process Act, 2001 |
| 54 | National Parks Amendment Act, 2001 |
| 55 | Medical Schemes Amendment Act, 2001 |
| 56 | Private Security Industry Regulation Act, 2001 |
| 57 | Education Laws Amendment Act, 2001 |
| 58 | General and Further Education and Training Quality Assurance Act, 2001 |
| 59 | Adjustments Appropriation Act, 2001 |
| 60 | Second Revenue Laws Amendment Act, 2001 |
| 61 | Act number originally assigned to the Constitution Seventh Amendment Act |
| 62 | Criminal Procedure Second Amendment Act, 2001 |
| 63 | Unemployment Insurance Act, 2001 |
| 64 | Telecommunications Amendment Act, 2001 |
| 65 | Pension Funds Amendment Act, 2001 |
| 66 | "Woordeboek van die Afrikaanse Taal" Act Repeal Act, 2001 |
| 67 | Academy of Science of South Africa Act, 2001 |
| 68 | Africa Institute of South Africa Act, 2001 |
| 69 | Cultural Laws Second Amendment Act, 2001 |

== 2002 ==
| Act no. | Short title |
|---|---|
| | Constitution of the Republic of South Africa Amendment Act, 2002 (before 2005); Constitution Eighth Amendment Act of 2002 (after 2005) |
| | Constitution of the Republic of South Africa Second Amendment Act, 2002 (before 2005); Constitution Ninth Amendment Act of 2002 (after 2005) |
| 1 | Births and Deaths Registration Amendment Act, 2002 |
| 2 | Social Grants Appropriation Act, 2002 |
| 3 | Burundi Protection Support Appropriation Act, 2002 |
| 4 | Unemployment Insurance Contributions Act, 2002 |
| 5 | Division of Revenue Act, 2002 |
| 6 | Animal Identification Act, 2002 |
| 7 | Animal Health Act, 2002 |
| 8 | Performers' Protection Amendment Act, 2002 |
| 9 | Copyright Amendment Act, 2002 |
| 10 | Veterinary and Para-Veterinary Professions Amendment Act, 2002 |
| 11 | Basic Conditions of Employment Amendment Act, 2002 |
| 12 | Labour Relations Amendment Act, 2002 |
| 13 | Immigration Act, 2002 |
| 14 | Media Development and Diversity Agency Act, 2002 |
| 15 | Land and Agricultural Development Bank Act, 2002 |
| 16 | National Railway Safety Regulator Act, 2002 |
| 17 | Mental Health Care Act, 2002 |
| 18 | Act number originally assigned to the Constitution Eighth Amendment Act |
| 19 | Commission for the Promotion and Protection of the Rights of Cultural, Religious and Linguistic Communities Act, 2002 |
| 20 | Local Government: Municipal Structures Amendment Act, 2002 |
| 21 | Act number originally assigned to the Constitution Ninth Amendment Act |
| 22 | Loss or Retention of Membership of National and Provincial Legislatures Act, 2002 |
| 23 | Private Security Industry Levies Act, 2002 |
| 24 | KwaZulu Cane Growers' Association Act Repeal Act, 2002 |
| 25 | Electronic Communications and Transactions Act, 2002 |
| 26 | Disestablishment of South African Housing Trust Limited Act, 2002 |
| 27 | Implementation of the Rome Statute of the International Criminal Court Act, 2002 |
| 28 | Mineral and Petroleum Resources Development Act, 2002 |
| 29 | Appropriation Act, 2002 |
| 30 | Taxation Laws Amendment Act, 2002 |
| 31 | Health Donations Fund Act Repeal Act, 2002 |
| 32 | Reinstatement of Enrolment of Certain Deceased Legal Practitioners Act, 2002 |
| 33 | Insolvency Amendment Act, 2002 |
| 34 | Export Credit and Foreign Investments Insurance Amendment Act, 2002 |
| 35 | Probation Services Amendment Act, 2002 |
| 36 | Planning Professions Act, 2002 |
| 37 | Financial Advisory and Intermediary Services Act, 2002 |
| 38 | State Information Technology Agency Amendment Act, 2002 |
| 39 | Corporate Laws Amendment Act, 2002 |
| 40 | Institution of Legal Proceedings against certain Organs of State Act, 2002 |
| 41 | National Conventional Arms Control Act, 2002 |
| 42 | Defence Act, 2002 |
| 43 | Road Accidents Fund Amendment Act, 2002 |
| 44 | South African Maritime and Aeronautical Search and Rescue Act, 2002 |
| 45 | Collective Investment Schemes Control Act, 2002 |
| 46 | South African Revenue Service Amendment Act, 2002 |
| 47 | Administration of Estates Amendment Act, 2002 |
| 48 | Finance Act, 2002 |
| 49 | Agricultural Debt Management Amendment Act, 2002 |
| 50 | Education Laws Amendment Act, 2002 |
| 51 | Local Government Laws Amendment Act, 2002 |
| 52 | Promotion of Equality and Prevention of Unfair Discrimination Amendment Act, 2002 |
| 53 | Promotion of Administrative Justice Amendment Act, 2002 |
| 54 | Promotion of Access to Information Amendment Act, 2002 |
| 55 | Judicial Matters Amendment Act, 2002 |
| 56 | National Environmental Management Amendment Act, 2002 |
| 57 | Disaster Management Act, 2002 |
| 58 | Patents Amendment Act, 2002 |
| 59 | Medicines and Related Substances Amendment Act, 2002 |
| 60 | Occupational Diseases in Mines and Works Amendment Act, 2002 |
| 61 | Merchandise Marks Amendment Act, 2002 |
| 62 | Medical Schemes Amendment Act, 2002 |
| 63 | Higher Education Amendment Act, 2002 |
| 64 | Broadcasting Amendment Act, 2002 |
| 65 | Intelligence Services Act, 2002 |
| 66 | Intelligence Services Control Amendment Act, 2002 |
| 67 | National Strategic Intelligence Amendment Act, 2002 |
| 68 | Electronic Communications Security (Pty) Ltd Act, 2002 |
| 69 | Insolvency Second Amendment Act, 2002 |
| 70 | Regulation of Interception of Communications and Provision of Communication-related Information Act, 2002 |
| 71 | International Trade Administration Act, 2002 |
| 72 | Administrative Adjudication of Road Traffic Offences Amendment Act, 2002 |
| 73 | Adjustments Appropriation Act, 2002 |
| 74 | Revenue Laws Amendment Act, 2002 |
| 75 | Gas Regulator Levies Act, 2002 |

== 2003 ==
| Act no. | Short title |
|---|---|
| | Constitution of the Republic of South Africa Amendment Act, 2003 (before 2005); Constitution Tenth Amendment Act of 2003 (after 2005) |
| | Constitution of the Republic of South Africa Second Amendment Act, 2003 (before 2005); Constitution Eleventh Amendment Act of 2003 (after 2005) |
| 1 | Local Government: Municipal Structures Amendment Act, 2003 |
| 2 | Act number originally assigned to the Constitution Tenth Amendment Act |
| 3 | Act number originally assigned to the Constitution Eleventh Amendment Act |
| 4 | Gold and Foreign Exchange Contingency Reserve Account Defrayal Act, 2003 |
| 5 | Food Relief Adjustments Appropriation Act, 2003 |
| 6 | National Development Agency Amendment Act, 2003 |
| 7 | Division of Revenue Act, 2003 |
| 8 | Pensions (Supplementary) Act, 2003 |
| 9 | Deeds Registries Amendment Act, 2003 |
| 10 | Usury Amendment Act, 2003 |
| 11 | Geoscience Amendment Act, 2003 |
| 12 | Exchange Control Amnesty and Amendment of Taxation Laws Act, 2003 |
| 13 | Bophuthatswana National Provident Fund Act Repeal Act, 2003 |
| 14 | Sefalana Employee Benefits Organisation Act Repeal Act, 2003 |
| 15 | Explosives Act, 2003 |
| 16 | Judicial Matters Amendment Act, 2003 |
| 17 | Insurance Amendment Act, 2003 |
| 18 | Appropriation Act, 2003 |
| 19 | Banks Amendment Act, 2003 |
| 20 | National Road Traffic Amendment Act, 2003 |
| 21 | Special Pensions Amendment Act, 2003 |
| 22 | Public Protector Amendment Act, 2003 |
| 23 | Promotion of National Unity and Reconciliation Amendment Act, 2003 |
| 24 | Mining Titles Registration Amendment Act, 2003 |
| 25 | Financial and Fiscal Commission Amendment Act, 2003 |
| 26 | National Small Business Amendment Act, 2003 |
| 27 | Natural Scientific Professions Act, 2003 |
| 28 | Judicial Officers (Amendment of Conditions of Service) Act, 2003 |
| 29 | Sectional Titles Amendment Act, 2003 |
| 30 | Special Pensions Second Amendment Act, 2003 |
| 31 | Skills Development Amendment Act, 2003 |
| 32 | Unemployment Insurance Amendment Act, 2003 |
| 33 | Postal Services Amendment Act, 2003 |
| 34 | Electoral Laws Amendment Act, 2003 |
| 35 | Government Employees Pension Law Amendment Act, 2003 |
| 36 | Anti-Personnel Mines Prohibition Act, 2003 |
| 37 | Adjustments Appropriation Act, 2003 |
| 38 | Higher Education Amendment Act, 2003 |
| 39 | Pensions Second (Supplementary) Act, 2003 |
| 40 | Electoral Laws Second Amendment Act, 2003 |
| 41 | Traditional Leadership and Governance Framework Act, 2003 |
| 42 | Criminal Procedure Amendment Act, 2003 |
| 43 | Firearms Control Amendment Act, 2003 |
| 44 | Local Government: Municipal Systems Amendment Act, 2003 |
| 45 | Revenue Laws Amendment Act, 2003 |
| 46 | National Environmental Management Amendment Act, 2003 |
| 47 | Agricultural Produce Agents Amendment Act, 2003 |
| 48 | Restitution of Land Rights Amendment Act, 2003 |
| 49 | Alteration of Sex Description and Sex Status Act, 2003 |
| 50 | Environment Conservation Amendment Act, 2003 |
| 51 | Armaments Corporation of South Africa, Limited Act, 2003 |
| 52 | General Intelligence Laws Amendment Act, 2003 |
| 53 | Broad-Based Black Economic Empowerment Act, 2003 |
| 54 | Spatial Data Infrastructure Act, 2003 |
| 55 | Judicial Matters Second Amendment Act, 2003 |
| 56 | Local Government: Municipal Finance Management Act, 2003 |
| 57 | National Environmental Management: Protected Areas Act, 2003 |
| 58 | Petroleum Products Amendment Act, 2003 |
| 59 | Liquor Act, 2003 |
| 60 | Petroleum Pipelines Act, 2003 |
| 61 | National Health Act, 2003 |

== 2004 ==
| Act no. | Short title |
|---|---|
| 1 | Education Laws Amendment Act, 2004 |
| 2 | Telecommunications Amendment Act, 2004 |
| 3 | Drought Relief Adjustments Appropriation Act, 2004 |
| 4 | Powers, Privileges and Immunities of Parliament and Provincial Legislatures Act, 2004 |
| 5 | Division of Revenue Act, 2004 |
| 6 | Local Government: Municipal Property Rates Act, 2004 |
| 7 | National Gambling Act, 2004 |
| 8 | National Environmental Management Amendment Act, 2004 |
| 9 | South African Social Security Agency Act, 2004 |
| 10 | National Environmental Management: Biodiversity Act, 2004 |
| 11 | Communal Land Rights Act, 2004 |
| 12 | Prevention and Combating of Corrupt Activities Act, 2004 |
| 13 | Social Assistance Act, 2004 |
| 14 | Electoral Commission Amendment Act, 2004 |
| 15 | Appropriation Act, 2004 |
| 16 | Taxation Laws Amendment Act, 2004 |
| 17 | South African Citizenship Amendment Act, 2004 |
| 18 | Films and Publications Amendment Act, 2004 |
| 19 | Immigration Amendment Act, 2004 |
| 20 | Companies Amendment Act, 2004 |
| 21 | Government Employees Pension Law Amendment Act, 2004 |
| 22 | National Payment System Amendment Act, 2004 |
| 23 | Public Investment Corporation Act, 2004 |
| 24 | Dental Technicians Amendment Act, 2004 |
| 25 | Public Audit Act, 2004 |
| 26 | Finance Act, 2004 |
| 27 | Adjustments Appropriation Act, 2004 |
| 28 | Petroleum Pipelines Levies Act, 2004 |
| 29 | National Small Business Amendment Act, 2004 |
| 30 | Water Services Amendment Act, 2004 |
| 31 | National Environmental Management: Protected Areas Amendment Act, 2004 |
| 32 | Revenue Laws Amendment Act, 2004 |
| 33 | Protection of Constitutional Democracy against Terrorist and Related Activities Act, 2004 |
| 34 | Second Revenue Laws Amendment Act, 2004 |
| 35 | Traditional Health Practitioners Act, 2004 |
| 36 | Securities Services Act, 2004 |
| 37 | Financial Services Ombud Schemes Act, 2004 |
| 38 | Choice on Termination of Pregnancy Amendment Act, 2004 |
| 39 | National Environmental Management: Air Quality Act, 2004 |
| 40 | National Energy Regulator Act, 2004 |

== 2005 ==
| Act no. | Short title |
|---|---|
| | Constitution Twelfth Amendment Act of 2005 |
| 1 | Division of Revenue Act, 2005 |
| 2 | Petroleum Products Amendment Act, 2005 |
| 3 | Sterilisation Amendment Act, 2005 |
| 4 | Appropriation Act, 2005 |
| 5 | Citation of Constitutional Laws Act, 2005 |
| 6 | Re-determination of the Boundaries of Cross-boundary Municipalities Act, 2005 |
| 7 | Sectional Titles Amendment Act, 2005 |
| 8 | South African Sports Commission Act Repeal Act, 2005 |
| 9 | Taxation Laws Amendment Act, 2005 |
| 10 | Taxation Laws Second Amendment Act, 2005 |
| 11 | Minerals and Energy Laws Amendment Act, 2005 |
| 12 | National Ports Act, 2005 |
| 13 | Intergovernmental Relations Framework Act, 2005 |
| 14 | Co-operatives Act, 2005 |
| 15 | Constitutional Matters Amendment Act, 2005 |
| 16 | Armaments Corporation of South Africa, Limited Amendment Act, 2005 |
| 17 | South African Abattoir Corporation Act Repeal Act, 2005 |
| 18 | Defence Special Account Amendment Act, 2005 |
| 19 | Road Accident Fund Amendment Act, 2005 |
| 20 | Patents Amendment Act, 2005 |
| 21 | Adjustments Appropriation Act, 2005 |
| 22 | Judicial Matters Amendment Act, 2005 |
| 23 | Cross-boundary Municipalities Laws Repeal and Related Matters Act, 2005 |
| 24 | Education Laws Amendment Act, 2005 |
| 25 | Close Corporations Amendment Act, 2005 |
| 26 | Auditing Profession Act, 2005 |
| 27 | Special Pensions Amendment Act, 2005 |
| 28 | Repeal of the Black Administration Act and Amendment of Certain Laws Act, 2005 |
| 29 | Diamonds Amendment Act, 2005 |
| 30 | Diamonds Second Amendment Act, 2005 |
| 31 | Revenue Laws Amendment Act, 2005 |
| 32 | Revenue Laws Second Amendment Act, 2005 |
| 33 | Nursing Act, 2005 |
| 34 | National Credit Act, 2005 |
| 35 | Forestry Laws Amendment Act, 2005 |
| 36 | Electronic Communications Act, 2005 |
| 37 | Precious Metals Act, 2005 |
| 38 | Children's Act, 2005 |

== 2006 ==
| Act no. | Short title |
|---|---|
| 1 | Additional Adjustments Appropriation Act, 2006 |
| 2 | Division of Revenue Act, 2006 |
| 3 | Independent Communications Authority of South Africa Amendment Act, 2006 |
| 4 | Electricity Regulation Act, 2006 |
| 5 | Deeds Registries Amendment Act, 2006 |
| 6 | Sectional Titles Amendment Act, 2006 |
| 7 | Appropriation Act, 2006 |
| 8 | Repeal of the Black Administration Act and Amendment of Certain Laws Amendment Act, 2006 |
| 9 | Small Business Tax Amnesty and Amendment of Taxation Laws Act, 2006 |
| 10 | Second Small Business Tax Amnesty and Amendment of Taxation Laws Act, 2006 |
| 11 | 2010 FIFA World Cup South Africa Special Measures Act, 2006 |
| 12 | Second 2010 FIFA World Cup South Africa Special Measures Act, 2006 |
| 13 | Older Persons Act, 2006 |
| 14 | Adjustments Appropriation Act, 2006 |
| 15 | Carriage by Air Amendment Act, 2006 |
| 16 | Further Education and Training Colleges Act, 2006 |
| 17 | Civil Union Act, 2006 |
| 18 | Measurement Units and Measurement Standards Act, 2006 |
| 19 | Accreditation for Conformity Assessment, Calibration and Good Laboratory Practice Act, 2006 |
| 20 | Revenue Laws Amendment Act, 2006 |
| 21 | Revenue Laws Second Amendment Act, 2006 |
| 22 | Postal Services Amendment Act, 2006 |
| 23 | Genetically Modified Organisms Amendment Act, 2006 |
| 24 | Corporate Laws Amendment Act, 2006 |
| 25 | South African Institute for Drug-Free Sport Amendment Act, 2006 |
| 26 | National Land Transport Transition Amendment Act, 2006 |
| 27 | Prohibition of Mercenary Activities and Regulation of Certain Activities in Country of Armed Conflict Act, 2006 |
| 28 | Firearms Control Amendment Act, 2006 |

== 2007 ==
| Act no. | Short title |
|---|---|
| | Constitution Thirteenth Amendment Act of 2007 |
| 1 | Division of Revenue Act, 2007 |
| 2 | Finance Act, 2007 |
| 3 | Immigration Amendment Act, 2007 |
| 4 | Convention on International Interests in Mobile Equipment Act, 2007 |
| 5 | South African Airways Act, 2007 |
| 6 | Transnet Pension Fund Amendment Act, 2007 |
| 7 | Appropriation Act, 2007 |
| 8 | Taxation Laws Amendment Act, 2007 |
| 9 | Taxation Laws Second Amendment Act, 2007 |
| 10 | South African Red Cross Society and Legal Protection of Certain Emblems Act, 2007 |
| 11 | Pension Funds Amendment Act, 2007 |
| 12 | Municipal Fiscal Powers and Functions Act, 2007 |
| 13 | Repeal of the Black Administration Act and Amendment of Certain Laws Amendment Act, 2007 |
| 14 | Diamond Export Levy (Administration) Act, 2007 |
| 15 | Diamond Export Levy Act, 2007 |
| 16 | Special Adjustments Appropriation Act (2007/08 Financial Year), 2007 |
| 17 | Housing Consumers Protection Measures Amendment Act, 2007 |
| 18 | National Sport and Recreation Amendment Act, 2007 |
| 19 | Government Immovable Asset Management Act, 2007 |
| 20 | Banks Amendment Act, 2007 |
| 21 | Astronomy Geographic Advantage Act, 2007 |
| 22 | Traditional Health Practitioners Act, 2007 |
| 23 | Tobacco Products Control Amendment Act, 2007 |
| 24 | Cross-boundary Municipalities Laws Repeal and Related Matters Amendment Act, 2007 |
| 25 | Securities Transfer Tax Act, 2007 |
| 26 | Securities Transfer Tax Administration Act, 2007 |
| 27 | Adjustments Appropriation Act, 2007 |
| 28 | Electricity Regulation Amendment Act, 2007 |
| 29 | Health Professions Amendment Act, 2007 |
| 30 | Public Service Amendment Act, 2007 |
| 31 | Education Laws Amendment Act, 2007 |
| 32 | Criminal Law (Sexual Offences and Related Matters) Amendment Act, 2007 |
| 33 | Broadband Infraco Act, 2007 |
| 34 | South African Express Act, 2007 |
| 35 | Revenue Laws Amendment Act, 2007 |
| 36 | Revenue Laws Second Amendment Act, 2007 |
| 37 | Electronic Communications Amendment Act, 2007 |
| 38 | Criminal Law (Sentencing) Amendment Act, 2007 |
| 39 | Foodstuffs, Cosmetics and Disinfectants Amendment Act, 2007 |
| 40 | Co-operative Banks Act, 2007 |
| 41 | Children's Amendment Act, 2007 |
| 42 | Transport Agencies General Laws Amendment Act, 2007 |
| 43 | Rental Housing Amendment Act, 2007 |

== 2008 ==
| Act no. | Short title |
|---|---|
| | Constitution Fourteenth Amendment Act of 2008 |
| | Constitution Fifteenth Amendment Act of 2008 |
| 1 | Choice on Termination of Pregnancy Amendment Act, 2008 |
| 2 | Division of Revenue Act, 2008 |
| 3 | Taxation Laws Amendment Act, 2008 |
| 4 | Taxation Laws Second Amendment Act, 2008 |
| 5 | National Regulator for Compulsory Specifications Act, 2008 |
| 6 | Social Assistance Amendment Act, 2008 |
| 7 | Repeal of the Black Administration Act and Amendment of Certain Laws Amendment Act, 2008 |
| 8 | Standards Act, 2008 |
| 9 | Appropriation Act, 2008 |
| 10 | National Gambling Amendment Act, 2008 |
| 11 | Financial Intelligence Centre Amendment Act, 2008 |
| 12 | Cross-Border Road Transport Amendment Act, 2008 |
| 13 | Special Pensions Amendment Act, 2008 |
| 14 | South African Judicial Education Institute Act, 2008 |
| 15 | Agricultural Debt Management Repeal Act, 2008 |
| 16 | Social Housing Act, 2008 |
| 17 | Human Sciences Research Council Act, 2008 |
| 18 | Prohibition or Restriction of Certain Conventional Weapons Act, 2008 |
| 19 | Local Government Laws Amendment Act, 2008 |
| 20 | Judicial Service Commission Amendment Act, 2008 |
| 21 | Air Services Licensing Amendment Act, 2008 |
| 22 | Financial Services Laws General Amendment Act, 2008 |
| 23 | Housing Development Agency Act, 2008 |
| 24 | National Environmental Management: Integrated Coastal Management Act, 2008 |
| 25 | Correctional Services Amendment Act, 2008 |
| 26 | Technology Innovation Agency Act, 2008 |
| 27 | Insurance Laws Amendment Act, 2008 |
| 28 | Mineral and Petroleum Resources Royalty Act, 2008 |
| 29 | Mineral and Petroleum Resources Royalty (Administration) Act, 2008 |
| 30 | Renaming of High Courts Act, 2008 |
| 31 | Jurisdiction of Regional Courts Amendment Act, 2008 |
| 32 | Liquor Products Amendment Act, 2008 |
| 33 | Refugees Amendment Act, 2008 |
| 34 | National Energy Act, 2008 |
| 35 | Diplomatic Immunities and Privileges Amendment Act, 2008 |
| 36 | South African National Space Agency Act, 2008 |
| 37 | Skills Development Amendment Act, 2008 |
| 38 | Legal Succession to the South African Transport Services Amendment Act, 2008 |
| 39 | Higher Education Amendment Act, 2008 |
| 40 | Adjustments Appropriation Act, 2008 |
| 41 | Eskom Subordinated Loan Special Appropriation Act (2008/09–2010/11 Financial Years), 2008, 2008 |
| 42 | Finance Act, 2008 |
| 43 | Government Employees Pension Fund (Condonation of Interrupted Service) Act, 2008 |
| 44 | National Environment Laws Amendment Act, 2008 |
| 45 | Methodist Church of Southern Africa (Private) Act Repeal Act, 2008 |
| 46 | Dutch Reformed Churches Union Act Repeal Act, 2008 |
| 47 | The Apostolic Faith Mission of South Africa (Private) Act Repeal Act, 2008 |
| 48 | Regulation of Interception of Communications and Provision of Communication-related Information Amendment Act, 2008 |
| 49 | Mineral and Petroleum Resources Development Amendment Act, 2008 |
| 50 | General and Further Education and Training Quality Assurance Amendment Act, 2008 |
| 51 | Intellectual Property Rights from Publicly Financed Research and Development Act, 2008 |
| 52 | Mandating Procedures of Provinces Act, 2008 |
| 53 | National Radioactive Waste Disposal Institute Act, 2008 |
| 54 | National Youth Development Agency Act, 2008 |
| 55 | General Laws (Loss of Membership of National Assembly, Provincial Legislature or Municipal Council) Amendment Act, 2008 |
| 56 | National Prosecuting Authority Amendment Act, 2008 |
| 57 | South African Police Service Amendment Act, 2008 |
| 58 | Provision of Land Assistance Amendment Act, 2008 |
| 59 | National Environmental Management: Waste Act, 2008 |
| 60 | Revenue Laws Amendment Act, 2008 |
| 61 | Revenue Laws Second Amendment Act, 2008 |
| 62 | National Environmental Management Amendment Act, 2008 |
| 63 | Tobacco Products Control Amendment Act, 2008 |
| 64 | National Road Traffic Amendment Act, 2008 |
| 65 | Criminal Procedure Amendment Act, 2008 |
| 66 | Judicial Matters Amendment Act, 2008 |
| 67 | National Qualifications Framework Act, 2008 |
| 68 | Consumer Protection Act, 2008 |
| 69 | National Railway Safety Regulator Amendment Act, 2008 |
| 70 | Prevention of and Treatment for Substance Abuse Act, 2008 |
| 71 | Companies Act, 2008 |
| 72 | Medicines and Related Substances Amendment Act, 2008 |
| 73 | National Conventional Arms Control Amendment Act, 2008 |
| 74 | Mine Health and Safety Amendment Act, 2008 |
| 75 | Child Justice Act, 2008 |

== 2009 ==
| Act no. | Short title |
|---|---|
| | Constitution Sixteenth Amendment Act of 2009 |
| 1 | Competition Amendment Act, 2009 |
| 2 | Bible Society of South Africa Act Repeal Act, 2009 |
| 3 | Films and Publications Amendment Act, 2009 |
| 4 | Foodstuffs, Cosmetics and Disinfectants Amendment Act, 2009 |
| 5 | National Land Transport Act, 2009 |
| 6 | Second-Hand Goods Act, 2009 |
| 7 | Western Cape Inherited Debt Relief Act, 2009 |
| 8 | Cross-boundary Municipalities Laws Repeal and Related Matters Amendment Act, 2009 |
| 9 | Money Bills Amendment Procedure and Related Matters Act, 2009 |
| 10 | Financial Management of Parliament Act, 2009 |
| 11 | Reform of Customary Law of Succession and Regulation of Related Matters Act, 2009 |
| 12 | Division of Revenue Act, 2009 |
| 13 | Civil Aviation Act, 2009 |
| 14 | National Environmental Laws Amendment Act, 2009 |
| 15 | National Environmental Management: Protected Areas Amendment Act, 2009 |
| 16 | Appropriation Act, 2009 |
| 17 | Taxation Laws Amendment Act, 2009 |
| 18 | Taxation Laws Second Amendment Act, 2009 |
| 19 | Local Government: Municipal Property Rates Amendment Act, 2009 |
| 20 | Repeal of the Black Administration Act and Amendment of Certain Laws Amendment Act, 2009 |
| 21 | Adjustments Appropriation Act, 2009 |
| 22 | National House of Traditional Leaders Act, 2009 |
| 23 | Traditional Leadership and Governance Framework Amendment Act, 2009 |
