= Stellenbosch Local Municipality elections =

Results of the 2016 Municipal Elections DA (30) ANC (8) EFF (2) Other parties (3)

The Stellenbosch Local Municipality council consists of forty-three members elected by mixed-member proportional representation. Twenty-two councillors are elected by first-past-the-post voting in twenty-two wards, while the remaining twenty-one are chosen from party lists so that the total number of party representatives is proportional to the number of votes received.

In the 2026 local government elections, the Democratic Alliance (DA) received a majority of twenty-eight seats on the council.

== Results ==
The following table shows the composition of the council after past elections.

Event	ACDP	ANC	DA	EFF	FF+	PA	Other	Total
2000 election	2	14	15	—	—	—	4	35
2002 floor-crossing	2	14	12	—	—	—	7	35
2004 floor-crossing	2	20	11	—	—	—	2	35
2006 election	2	16	15	—	0	—	4	37
2007 floor-crossing	2	17	15	—	0	—	3	37
2011 election	1	11	25	—	0	—	6	43
2016 election	1	8	30	2	0	—	2	43
2021 election	1	8	28	2	1	1	4	45
2026 election	1	5	28	1	2	4	4	45

== December 2000 election ==
The following table shows the results of the 2000 election.

Party	Ward			List			Total seats
Party	Votes	%	Seats	Votes	%	Seats	Total seats
Democratic Alliance	12,426	41.90	8	12,985	43.79	7	15
African National Congress	12,032	40.58	10	12,128	40.90	4	14
Alliance for the Community	1,848	6.23	0	1,494	5.04	2	2
African Christian Democratic Party	1,515	5.11	0	1,421	4.79	2	2
United Democratic Movement	1,015	3.42	0	1,110	3.74	1	1
Kayamandi Community Alliance	384	1.29	0	515	1.74	1	1
Independent candidates	433	1.46	0				0
Total	29,653	100.00	18	29,653	100.00	17	35
Valid votes	29,653	98.42		29,653	98.43		
Invalid/blank votes	476	1.58		474	1.57		
Total votes	30,129	100.00		30,127	100.00		
Registered voters/turnout	55,422	54.36		55,422	54.36		

=== October 2002 floor crossing ===
In terms of the Eighth Amendment of the Constitution and the judgment of the Constitutional Court in United Democratic Movement v President of the Republic of South Africa and Others, in the period from 8–22 October 2002 councillors had the opportunity to cross the floor to a different political party without losing their seats.

In the Stellenbosch council, three councillors from the Democratic Alliance (DA) crossed to the New National Party (NNP), which had formerly been part of the DA. The two councillors of the Alliance for the Community also crossed to the NNP.

Party	Seats before	Net change	Seats after
African National Congress	14	0	14
Democratic Alliance	15	▼3	12
New National Party	–	▲5	5
African Christian Democratic Party	2	0	2
United Democratic Movement	1	0	1
Kayamandi Community Alliance	1	0	1
Alliance for the Community	2	▼2	0

=== By-elections from October 2002 to August 2004 ===
The following by-elections were held to fill vacant ward seats in the period between the floor crossing periods in October 2002 and September 2004.

Date	Ward	Party of the previous councillor	Party of the newly elected councillor
18 June 2003	5	Democratic Alliance	Democratic Alliance
18 June 2003	12	Democratic Alliance	African National Congress
29 April 2004	11	African National Congress	African National Congress

=== September 2004 floor crossing ===
Another floor-crossing period occurred on 1–15 September 2004, in which the five NNP councillors crossed to the ANC.

Party	Seats before	Net change	Seats after
African National Congress	15	▲5	20
Democratic Alliance	11	0	11
African Christian Democratic Party	2	0	2
United Democratic Movement	1	0	1
Kayamandi Community Alliance	1	0	1
New National Party	5	▼5	0

== March 2006 election ==
The following table shows the results of the 2006 election.

Party	Ward			List			Total seats
Party	Votes	%	Seats	Votes	%	Seats	Total seats
African National Congress	12,976	42.10	10	12,935	41.98	6	16
Democratic Alliance	12,719	41.26	9	12,791	41.51	6	15
African Christian Democratic Party	1,539	4.99	0	1,422	4.62	2	2
Independent Democrats	1,178	3.82	0	1,576	5.11	2	2
Kayamandi Community Alliance	769	2.49	0	730	2.37	1	1
United Democratic Movement	492	1.60	0	685	2.22	1	1
Freedom Front Plus	235	0.76	0	283	0.92	0	0
Independent candidates	388	1.26	0				0
Pan Africanist Congress of Azania	206	0.67	0	148	0.48	0	0
United Independent Front	158	0.51	0	126	0.41	0	0
First Community Party of South Africa	164	0.53	0	116	0.38	0	0
Total	30,824	100.00	19	30,812	100.00	18	37
Valid votes	30,824	98.33		30,812	98.30		
Invalid/blank votes	522	1.67		532	1.70		
Total votes	31,346	100.00		31,344	100.00		
Registered voters/turnout	64,460	48.63		64,460	48.63		

=== September 2007 floor crossing ===
The final floor-crossing period occurred on 1–15 September 2007; floor-crossing was subsequently abolished in 2008 by the Fifteenth Amendment of the Constitution. In the Stellenbosch council, one councillor of the Independent Democrats crossed to the African National Congress.

Party	Seats before	Net change	Seats after
African National Congress	16	▲1	17
Democratic Alliance	15	0	15
African Christian Democratic Party	2	0	2
Independent Democrats	2	▼1	1
Kayamandi Community Alliance	1	0	1
United Democratic Movement	1	0	1

=== By-elections from September 2007 to May 2011 ===
The following by-elections were held to fill vacant ward seats in the period between the floor crossing period in September 2007 and the election in May 2011.

Date	Ward	Party of the previous councillor	Party of the newly elected councillor
19 March 2008	17	Democratic Alliance	Independent (Note: The former councillor was re-elected to the ward as an independent.)
24 June 2009	16	Democratic Alliance	Democratic Alliance
24 August 2010	1	African National Congress	Democratic Alliance

== May 2011 election ==
The following table shows the results of the 2011 election.

Party	Ward			List			Total seats
Party	Votes	%	Seats	Votes	%	Seats	Total seats
Democratic Alliance	28,515	58.26	17	29,166	59.69	8	25
African National Congress	12,116	24.75	5	12,180	24.93	6	11
Stellenbosch Civic Association	3,290	6.72	0	2,994	6.13	3	3
Congress of the People	1,025	2.09	0	958	1.96	1	1
National People's Party	740	1.51	0	710	1.45	1	1
Stellenbosch People's Alliance	731	1.49	0	616	1.26	1	1
African Christian Democratic Party	657	1.34	0	554	1.13	1	1
Studente Stem Party	362	0.74	0	383	0.78	0	0
South African Progressive Civic Organisation	363	0.74	0	311	0.64	0	0
National Freedom Party	218	0.45	0	322	0.66	0	0
United Democratic Movement	174	0.36	0	253	0.52	0	0
Freedom Front Plus	204	0.42	0	156	0.32	0	0
Kayamandi Community Alliance	163	0.33	0	178	0.36	0	0
Independent candidates	254	0.52	0				0
Universal Civics of South Africa	94	0.19	0	42	0.09	0	0
United Independent Front	15	0.03	0	37	0.08	0	0
United Christian Democratic Party	24	0.05	0				0
Total	48,945	100.00	22	48,860	100.00	21	43
Valid votes	48,945	98.40		48,860	98.52		
Invalid/blank votes	795	1.60		733	1.48		
Total votes	49,740	100.00		49,593	100.00		
Registered voters/turnout	79,551	62.53		79,551	62.34		

=== By-elections from May 2011 to August 2016 ===
The following by-elections were held to fill vacant ward seats in the period between the elections in May 2011 and August 2016.

Date	Ward	Party of the previous councillor	Party of the newly elected councillor
6 March 2013	22	Democratic Alliance	Democratic Alliance

== August 2016 election ==
The following table shows the results of the 2016 election.

Party	Ward			List			Total seats
Party	Votes	%	Seats	Votes	%	Seats	Total seats
Democratic Alliance	38,821	69.71	18	39,191	69.07	12	30
African National Congress	10,693	19.20	4	11,413	20.11	4	8
Economic Freedom Fighters	2,052	3.68	0	2,108	3.72	2	2
Democratic New Civic Association	1,055	1.89	0	802	1.41	1	1
People's Democratic Movement	778	1.40	0	659	1.16	1	1
African Christian Democratic Party	661	1.19	0	650	1.15	1	1
African Independent Congress	319	0.57	0	506	0.89	0	0
Freedom Front Plus	412	0.74	0	387	0.68	0	0
United Franschhoek Valley	164	0.29	0	218	0.38	0	0
Khoisan Kingdom and All People	132	0.24	0	165	0.29	0	0
Congress of the People	69	0.12	0	168	0.30	0	0
Alliance for Democratic Freedom	119	0.21	0	109	0.19	0	0
Christian Democrats	96	0.17	0	116	0.20	0	0
Independent candidates	162	0.29	0				0
United Democratic Movement	39	0.07	0	121	0.21	0	0
African People's Convention	60	0.11	0	89	0.16	0	0
South African Progressive Civic Organisation	23	0.04	0	39	0.07	0	0
Nationalist Coloured Party of South Africa	16	0.03	0				0
Ubuntu Party	15	0.03	0				0
Total	55,686	100.00	22	56,741	100.00	21	43
Valid votes	55,686	99.19		56,741	99.28		
Invalid/blank votes	456	0.81		413	0.72		
Total votes	56,142	100.00		57,154	100.00		
Registered voters/turnout	91,881	61.10		91,881	62.20		

The local council sends five representatives to the council of the Cape Winelands District Municipality: four from the Democratic Alliance and one from the African National Congress

=== By-elections from August 2016 to November 2021 ===
The following by-elections were held to fill vacant ward seats in the period between the elections in August 2016 and November 2021.

Date	Ward	Party of the previous councillor	Party of the newly elected councillor
10 April 2019	9	Democratic Alliance	Democratic Alliance

== November 2021 election ==
The following table shows the results of the 2021 election.

Party	Ward			List			Total seats
Party	Votes	%	Seats	Votes	%	Seats	Total seats
Democratic Alliance	26,133	60.80	19	26,736	62.13	9	28
African National Congress	6,939	16.14	4	7,123	16.55	4	8
Good	2,572	5.98	0	2,739	6.36	3	3
Economic Freedom Fighters	1,824	4.24	0	1,798	4.18	2	2
African Christian Democratic Party	1,073	2.50	0	1,039	2.41	1	1
Freedom Front Plus	861	2.00	0	922	2.14	1	1
Independent candidates	1,029	2.39	0				0
Patriotic Alliance	499	1.16	0	497	1.15	1	1
People's Democratic Movement	468	1.09	0	382	0.89	1	1
Democratic New Civic Association	312	0.73	0	295	0.69	0	0
Cape Coloured Congress	242	0.56	0	288	0.67	0	0
African Transformation Movement	183	0.43	0	233	0.54	0	0
Pan Africanist Congress of Azania	164	0.38	0	187	0.43	0	0
Cape Independence Party	132	0.31	0	178	0.41	0	0
United Democratic Movement	129	0.30	0	174	0.40	0	0
Africa Restoration Alliance	79	0.18	0	90	0.21	0	0
Spectrum National Party	76	0.18	0	73	0.17	0	0
Al Jama-ah	75	0.17	0	71	0.16	0	0
Congress of the People	53	0.12	0	80	0.19	0	0
Independent Civic Organisation of South Africa	56	0.13	0	44	0.10	0	0
Economic Emancipation Forum	25	0.06	0	49	0.11	0	0
African Freedom Revolution	17	0.04	0	36	0.08	0	0
African Progressive Movement	43	0.10	0				0
Total	42,984	100.00	23	43,034	100.00	22	45
Valid votes	42,984	98.78		43,034	98.89		
Invalid/blank votes	531	1.22		481	1.11		
Total votes	43,515	100.00		43,515	100.00		
Registered voters/turnout	94,591	46.00		94,591	46.00		

=== By-elections from November 2021 ===
The following by-elections were held to fill vacant ward seats in the period since the election in November 2021.

Date	Ward	Party of the previous councillor	Party of the newly elected councillor
8 Mar 2023	21	Democratic Alliance	Democratic Alliance
28 Aug 2024	17	Democratic Alliance	Democratic Alliance
23 Oct 2024	8	Democratic Alliance	Democratic Alliance
14 May 2025	9	Democratic Alliance	Democratic Alliance
30 April 2026	15	Democratic Alliance	Patriotic Alliance

In a by-election in ward 21, held on 8 March 2023 after the previous DA councillor took up a vacancy in parliament, the DA candidate retained the seat for the party with a solid majority. The African Christian Democratic Party increased its share of the vote to take second place.

== November 2026 election ==
The following table shows the results of the 2026 election.

Party	Ward			List			Total seats
Party	Votes	%	Seats	Votes	%	Seats	Total seats
Democratic Alliance	33,620	61.53	19	33,899	61.99	9	28
African National Congress	6,281	11.49	4	6,291	11.50	1	5
Patriotic Alliance	4,803	8.79	0	4,847	8.86	4	4
Freedom Front Plus	2,406	4.40	0	2,570	4.70	2	2
Good	1,873	3.43	0	1,729	3.16	2	2
Economic Freedom Fighters	1,565	2.86	0	1,496	2.74	1	1
African Christian Democratic Party	903	1.65	0	799	1.46	1	1
uMkhonto weSizwe Party	462	0.85	0	517	0.95	1	1
African Transformation Movement	314	0.57	0	526	0.96	1	1
National Coloured Congress	372	0.68	0	334	0.61	0	0
Democratic New Civic Association	393	0.72	0	180	0.33	0	0
People's Movement for Change	302	0.55	0	269	0.49	0	0
South African Communist Party	283	0.52	0	249	0.46	0	0
Pan Africanist Congress of Azania	261	0.48	0	256	0.47	0	0
African Independent Congress	285	0.52	0	187	0.34	0	0
Alliance of Citizens for Change	157	0.29	0	149	0.27	0	0
Afrika Mayibuye Movement	153	0.28	0	147	0.27	0	0
People's Democratic Movement	134	0.25	0	148	0.27	0	0
Cape Independence Party	77	0.14	0	90	0.16	0	0
Total	54,644	100.00	23	54,683	100.00	22	45
Valid votes	54,644	99.22		54,683	99.01		
Invalid/blank votes	428	0.78		549	0.99		
Total votes	55,072	100.00		55,232	100.00		
Registered voters/turnout	106,255	51.83		106,255	51.98		
