= Swellendam Local Municipality elections =

Local elections in Western Cape, South Africa

The Swellendam Local Municipality council consists of eleven members elected by mixed-member proportional representation. Six councillors are elected by first-past-the-post voting in six wards, while the remaining five are chosen from party lists so that the total number of party representatives is proportional to the number of votes received. In the election of 1 November 2021, the Democratic Alliance (DA) retained its majority of six seats on the council.

== Results ==
The following table shows the composition of the council after past elections.

Event	ACDP	ANC	DA	FF+	Other	Total
2000 election	—	5	5	—	0	10
2002 floor-crossing	—	5	3	—	2	10
2004 floor-crossing	—	6	4	—	0	10
2006 election	1	4	3	—	2	10
2007 floor-crossing	1	3	3	—	3	10
2011 election	1	4	4	0	0	9
2016 election	0	5	6	0	0	11
2021 election	—	4	6	1	0	11
2026 election	—	4	4	1	2	11

== December 2000 election ==
The following table shows the results of the 2000 election.

Party	Ward			List			Total seats
Party	Votes	%	Seats	Votes	%	Seats	Total seats
Democratic Alliance	3,589	47.77	3	3,692	49.07	2	5
African National Congress	3,393	45.16	2	3,433	45.63	3	5
Pan Africanist Congress of Azania	423	5.63	0	399	5.30	0	0
Independent candidates	108	1.44	0				0
Total	7,513	100.00	5	7,524	100.00	5	10
Valid votes	7,513	98.80		7,524	98.87		
Invalid/blank votes	91	1.20		86	1.13		
Total votes	7,604	100.00		7,610	100.00		
Registered voters/turnout	11,319	67.18		11,319	67.23		

=== October 2002 floor crossing ===
In terms of the Eighth Amendment of the Constitution and the judgment of the Constitutional Court in United Democratic Movement v President of the Republic of South Africa and Others, in the period from 8–22 October 2002 councillors had the opportunity to cross the floor to a different political party without losing their seats.

In the Swellendam council, three councillors from the Democratic Alliance (DA) crossed to the New National Party (NNP), which had formerly been part of the DA.

Party	Seats before	Net change	Seats after
African National Congress	5	0	5
Democratic Alliance	5	▼2	3
New National Party	–	▲2	2

=== By-elections from October 2002 to August 2004 ===
The following by-elections were held to fill vacant ward seats in the period between the floor crossing periods in October 2002 and September 2004.

Date	Ward	Party of the previous councillor	Party of the newly elected councillor
19 March 2003	2	African National Congress	African National Congress
19 March 2003	4	New National Party (Note: The former councillor was elected for the Democratic Alliance but had since crossed the floor to the New National Party.)	Democratic Alliance

=== September 2004 floor crossing ===
Another floor-crossing period occurred on 1–15 September 2004, in which the remaining NNP councillor crossed to the ANC.

Party	Seats before	Net change	Seats after
African National Congress	5	▲1	6
Democratic Alliance	4	0	4
New National Party	1	▼1	0

== March 2006 election ==
The following table shows the results of the 2006 election.

Party	Ward			List			Total seats
Party	Votes	%	Seats	Votes	%	Seats	Total seats
African National Congress	3,029	38.57	3	2,985	38.18	1	4
Democratic Alliance	2,308	29.39	1	2,425	31.01	2	3
Independent Democrats	1,891	24.08	1	1,972	25.22	1	2
African Christian Democratic Party	430	5.47	0	437	5.59	1	1
Independent candidates	196	2.50	0				0
Total	7,854	100.00	5	7,819	100.00	5	10
Valid votes	7,854	98.45		7,819	98.01		
Invalid/blank votes	124	1.55		159	1.99		
Total votes	7,978	100.00		7,978	100.00		
Registered voters/turnout	13,334	59.83		13,334	59.83		

=== September 2007 floor crossing ===
The final floor-crossing period occurred on 1–15 September 2007; floor-crossing was subsequently abolished in 2008 by the Fifteenth Amendment of the Constitution. In the Swellendam council, one councillor from the African National Congress crossed to the Independent Democrats.

Party	Seats before	Net change	Seats after
African National Congress	4	▼1	3
Democratic Alliance	3	0	3
Independent Democrats	2	▲1	3
African Christian Democratic Party	1	0	1

== May 2011 election ==
The following table shows the results of the 2011 election.

Party	Ward			List			Total seats
Party	Votes	%	Seats	Votes	%	Seats	Total seats
African National Congress	4,336	41.19	2	4,490	42.58	2	4
Democratic Alliance	4,270	40.56	3	4,359	41.34	1	4
African Christian Democratic Party	683	6.49	0	686	6.51	1	1
National Independent Civic Organisation	462	4.39	0	455	4.32	0	0
Civic Independent	254	2.41	0	274	2.60	0	0
Congress of the People	145	1.38	0	154	1.46	0	0
Freedom Front Plus	129	1.23	0	107	1.01	0	0
Independent candidates	182	1.73	0				0
National People's Party	67	0.64	0	19	0.18	0	0
Total	10,528	100.00	5	10,544	100.00	4	9
Valid votes	10,528	98.99		10,544	99.12		
Invalid/blank votes	107	1.01		94	0.88		
Total votes	10,635	100.00		10,638	100.00		
Registered voters/turnout	15,909	66.85		15,909	66.87		

=== By-elections from May 2011 to August 2016 ===
The following by-elections were held to fill vacant ward seats in the period between the elections in May 2011 and August 2016.

Date	Ward	Party of the previous councillor	Party of the newly elected councillor
4 February 2015	5	African National Congress	African National Congress

== August 2016 election ==
The following table shows the results of the 2016 election.

Party	Ward			List			Total seats
Party	Votes	%	Seats	Votes	%	Seats	Total seats
Democratic Alliance	5,865	47.59	2	5,916	48.30	4	6
African National Congress	5,484	44.50	4	5,490	44.82	1	5
Freedom Front Plus	260	2.11	0	247	2.02	0	0
Independent Civic Organisation of South Africa	158	1.28	0	151	1.23	0	0
Civic Independent	133	1.08	0	128	1.04	0	0
Economic Freedom Fighters	106	0.86	0	110	0.90	0	0
African Christian Democratic Party	103	0.84	0	101	0.82	0	0
Community and Workers Alliance	98	0.80	0	106	0.87	0	0
Independent candidates	117	0.95	0				0
Total	12,324	100.00	6	12,249	100.00	5	11
Valid votes	12,324	98.90		12,249	98.67		
Invalid/blank votes	137	1.10		165	1.33		
Total votes	12,461	100.00		12,414	100.00		
Registered voters/turnout	18,881	66.00		18,881	65.75		

In a by-election held on 24 July 2019, the DA managed to win a ward from the ANC.

Date	Ward	Party of the previous councillor	Party of the newly elected councillor
24 July 2019	2	African National Congress	Democratic Alliance

The council was reconfigured as seen below:

Party	Seats		
Party	Ward	List	Total
Democratic Alliance	3	4	7
African National Congress	3	1	4
Total	6	5	11

The local council sends one representative, a member of the Democratic Alliance, to the council of the Overberg District Municipality.

== November 2021 election ==
The following table shows the results of the 2021 election.

Party	Ward			List			Total seats
Party	Votes	%	Seats	Votes	%	Seats	Total seats
Democratic Alliance	6,150	52.14	3	6,219	52.30	3	6
African National Congress	4,454	37.76	3	4,699	39.52	1	4
Freedom Front Plus	370	3.14	0	368	3.10	1	1
Western Province Party	292	2.48	0	287	2.41	0	0
Independent candidates	277	2.35	0				0
Good	88	0.75	0	96	0.81	0	0
Economic Freedom Fighters	56	0.47	0	87	0.73	0	0
Independent Civic Organisation of South Africa	60	0.51	0	69	0.58	0	0
Cape Independence Party	22	0.19	0	39	0.33	0	0
Patriotic Alliance	26	0.22	0	26	0.22	0	0
Total	11,795	100.00	6	11,890	100.00	5	11
Valid votes	11,795	98.59		11,890	97.67		
Invalid/blank votes	169	1.41		284	2.33		
Total votes	11,964	100.00		12,174	100.00		
Registered voters/turnout	20,647	57.95		20,647	58.96		

=== By-elections from November 2021 ===
The following by-elections were held to fill vacant ward seats in the period since the election in November 2021.

Date	Ward	Party of the previous councillor	Party of the newly elected councillor
22 Mar 2023	2	Democratic Alliance	African National Congress
15 Oct 2025	6	African National Congress	Patriotic Alliance

In a by-election in ward 2, held on 22 March 2023 after the previous DA councillor was expelled, the ANC narrowly won the seat. The Patriotic Alliance (PA) increased its share from less than 1% in 2021 to 31%, finishing second, and taking votes from both the DA (49% to 30%) and ANC (48% to 37%).

== November 2026 election ==
The following table shows the results of the 2026 election.

Party	Ward			List			Total seats
Party	Votes	%	Seats	Votes	%	Seats	Total seats
Democratic Alliance	5,263	39.84	3	5,252	39.82	1	4
African National Congress	4,419	33.45	2	4,380	33.21	2	4
Patriotic Alliance	2,795	21.16	1	2,846	21.58	1	2
Freedom Front Plus	541	4.10	0	565	4.28	1	1
Economic Freedom Fighters	58	0.44	0	55	0.42	0	0
South African Communist Party	28	0.21	0	22	0.17	0	0
Cape Independence Party	22	0.17	0	23	0.17	0	0
Independent candidates	38	0.29	0				0
uMkhonto weSizwe Party	20	0.15	0	18	0.14	0	0
South Africa First	19	0.14	0	16	0.12	0	0
National Coloured Congress	8	0.06	0	13	0.10	0	0
Total	13,211	100.00	6	13,190	100.00	5	11
Valid votes	13,211	98.97		13,190	99.01		
Invalid/blank votes	138	1.03		132	0.99		
Total votes	13,349	100.00		13,322	100.00		
Registered voters/turnout	23,937	55.77		23,937	55.65		
