= Cape Agulhas Local Municipality elections =

Local elections in Western Cape, South Africa

The Cape Agulhas Local Municipality council consists of eleven members elected by mixed-member proportional representation. Six councillors are elected by first-past-the-post voting in six wards, while the remaining five are chosen from party lists so that the total number of party representatives is proportional to the number of votes received.

In the election of 4 November 2026, no party won a majority. The Democratic Alliance (DA) won a plurality of five seats.

== Results ==
The following table shows the composition of the council after past elections.

Event	ANC	DA	FF+	Other	Total
2000 election	4	6	—	0	10
2006 election	5	4	—	1	10
2007 floor-crossing	6	3	—	1	10
2011 election	4	4	—	1	9
2016 election	3	6	0	2	11
2021 election	3	5	1	2	11
2026 election	2	5	1	3	11

== December 2000 election ==
The following table shows the results of the 2000 election.

Party	Ward			List			Total seats
Party	Votes	%	Seats	Votes	%	Seats	Total seats
Democratic Alliance	4,385	52.21	3	4,975	59.33	3	6
African National Congress	3,279	39.05	2	3,411	40.67	2	4
Independent candidates	734	8.74	0				0
Total	8,398	100.00	5	8,386	100.00	5	10
Valid votes	8,398	98.37		8,386	98.24		
Invalid/blank votes	139	1.63		150	1.76		
Total votes	8,537	100.00		8,536	100.00		
Registered voters/turnout	11,983	71.24		11,983	71.23		

== March 2006 election ==
The following table shows the results of the 2006 election.

Party	Ward			List			Total seats
Party	Votes	%	Seats	Votes	%	Seats	Total seats
African National Congress	4,686	49.13	4	4,659	48.86	1	5
Democratic Alliance	3,552	37.24	1	3,713	38.94	3	4
African Christian Democratic Party	698	7.32	0	574	6.02	1	1
Independent Democrats	601	6.30	0	589	6.18	0	0
Total	9,537	100.00	5	9,535	100.00	5	10
Valid votes	9,537	98.86		9,535	98.88		
Invalid/blank votes	110	1.14		108	1.12		
Total votes	9,647	100.00		9,643	100.00		
Registered voters/turnout	14,732	65.48		14,732	65.46		

=== September 2007 floor crossing ===
In terms of the Eighth Amendment of the Constitution, in the period from 1–15 September 2007 councillors had the opportunity to cross the floor to a different political party without losing their seats. Floor-crossing was subsequently abolished in 2008 by the Fifteenth Amendment of the Constitution. In the Cape Agulhas council, one councillor crossed from the Democratic Alliance to the African National Congress.

Party	Seats before	Net change	Seats after
African National Congress	5	▲1	6
Democratic Alliance	4	▼1	3
African Christian Democratic Party	1	0	1

=== By-elections from September 2007 to May 2011 ===
The following by-elections were held to fill vacant ward seats in the period between the floor crossing period in September 2007 and the election in May 2011.

Date	Ward	Party of the previous councillor	Party of the newly elected councillor
25 August 2010	4	African National Congress	African National Congress

== May 2011 election ==
The following table shows the results of the 2011 election.

Party	Ward			List			Total seats
Party	Votes	%	Seats	Votes	%	Seats	Total seats
Democratic Alliance	5,888	47.19	3	6,158	49.19	1	4
African National Congress	4,810	38.55	1	5,515	44.05	3	4
Independent candidates	919	7.37	1				1
National People's Party	328	2.63	0	298	2.38	0	0
Congress of the People	251	2.01	0	246	1.96	0	0
Cape Agulhas Ratepayers Association	119	0.95	0	156	1.25	0	0
African Christian Democratic Party	115	0.92	0	108	0.86	0	0
Freedom Front Plus	47	0.38	0	39	0.31	0	0
Total	12,477	100.00	5	12,520	100.00	4	9
Valid votes	12,477	98.87		12,520	99.18		
Invalid/blank votes	143	1.13		104	0.82		
Total votes	12,620	100.00		12,624	100.00		
Registered voters/turnout	17,632	71.57		17,632	71.60		

=== By-elections from May 2011 to August 2016 ===
The following by-elections were held to fill vacant ward seats in the period between the elections in May 2011 and August 2016.

Date	Ward	Party of the previous councillor	Party of the newly elected councillor
11 November 2015	1	Democratic Alliance	Democratic Alliance

== August 2016 election ==
The following table shows the results of the 2016 election.

Party	Ward			List			Total seats
Party	Votes	%	Seats	Votes	%	Seats	Total seats
Democratic Alliance	6,888	52.62	4	7,062	54.00	2	6
African National Congress	3,938	30.09	2	3,972	30.37	1	3
Dienslewerings Party	1,400	10.70	0	1,247	9.54	1	1
Kaap Agulhas Civic Organisasie	478	3.65	0	394	3.01	1	1
Economic Freedom Fighters	174	1.33	0	189	1.45	0	0
Freedom Front Plus	163	1.25	0	182	1.39	0	0
Ubuntu Party	48	0.37	0	32	0.24	0	0
Total	13,089	100.00	6	13,078	100.00	5	11
Valid votes	13,089	99.00		13,078	99.00		
Invalid/blank votes	132	1.00		132	1.00		
Total votes	13,221	100.00		13,210	100.00		
Registered voters/turnout	19,650	67.28		19,650	67.23		

The local council sends two representatives to the council of the Overberg District Municipality: one from the Democratic Alliance and one from the African National Congress.

== November 2021 election ==
The following table shows the results of the 2021 election.

Party	Ward			List			Total seats
Party	Votes	%	Seats	Votes	%	Seats	Total seats
Democratic Alliance	5,092	42.64	3	5,397	45.45	2	5
African National Congress	3,223	26.99	2	3,149	26.52	1	3
Dienslewerings Party	1,540	12.90	1	1,472	12.40	1	2
Freedom Front Plus	1,089	9.12	0	860	7.24	1	1
The People's Agenda	241	2.02	0	192	1.62	0	0
Kaap Agulhas Civic Organisasie	159	1.33	0	192	1.62	0	0
Western Province Party	171	1.43	0	169	1.42	0	0
Good	118	0.99	0	140	1.18	0	0
Economic Freedom Fighters	77	0.64	0	82	0.69	0	0
Cape Independence Party	74	0.62	0	76	0.64	0	0
Land Party	57	0.48	0	74	0.62	0	0
Compatriots of South Africa	51	0.43	0	44	0.37	0	0
Congress of the People	16	0.13	0	28	0.24	0	0
Independent candidates	33	0.28	0				0
Total	11,941	100.00	6	11,875	100.00	5	11
Valid votes	11,941	99.01		11,875	99.02		
Invalid/blank votes	119	0.99		118	0.98		
Total votes	12,060	100.00		11,993	100.00		
Registered voters/turnout	21,173	56.96		21,173	56.64		

Following the loss of its majority, the DA formed a majority coalition government with the Freedom Front Plus (FF Plus) to govern the municipality.

=== By-elections from November 2021 ===
The following by-elections were held to fill vacant ward seats in the period since the election in November 2021.

Date	Ward	Party of the previous councillor	Party of the newly elected councillor
15 February 2023	5	Democratic Alliance	Democratic Alliance

== November 2026 election ==
The following table shows the results of the 2026 election.

Party	Ward			List			Total seats
Party	Votes	%	Seats	Votes	%	Seats	Total seats
Democratic Alliance	6,079	45.58	5	6,064	45.61	0	5
Patriotic Alliance	2,374	17.80	0	2,402	18.07	2	2
African National Congress	1,866	13.99	1	1,832	13.78	1	2
Freedom Front Plus	1,489	11.17	0	1,548	11.64	1	1
Dienslewerings Party	1,158	8.68	0	1,100	8.27	1	1
Economic Freedom Fighters	96	0.72	0	97	0.73	0	0
National Coloured Congress	95	0.71	0	90	0.68	0	0
Good	75	0.56	0	56	0.42	0	0
South Africa First	39	0.29	0	33	0.25	0	0
Spectrum National Party	24	0.18	0	22	0.17	0	0
Afrika Mayibuye Movement	14	0.10	0	19	0.14	0	0
Organic Humanity Movement	16	0.12	0	13	0.10	0	0
United Africans Transformation	11	0.08	0	18	0.14	0	0
Total	13,336	100.00	6	13,294	100.00	5	11
Valid votes	13,336	98.26		13,294	98.07		
Invalid/blank votes	236	1.74		261	1.93		
Total votes	13,572	100.00		13,555	100.00		
Registered voters/turnout	23,195	58.51		23,195	58.44		
