= Fourteenth Amendment (disambiguation) =

The Fourteenth Amendment to the United States Constitution was proclaimed in 1868 and addressed citizenship rights.

Fourteenth Amendment may also refer to:

- Fourteenth Amendment of the Constitution of India, established the union territory of Puducherry (Pondicherry)
- Fourteenth Amendment of the Constitution of Ireland, which guarantees free access to information on abortion in other countries
- Fourteenth Amendment to the Constitution of Pakistan, which gave party leaders the power to dismiss dissenting members of parliament
- Fourteenth Amendment of the Constitution of South Africa, which repealed some of the provisions allowing for floor-crossing, that had been added by the Ninth and Tenth Amendments
