= SACE =

SACE may refer to:

- South African Council for Educators (SACE)
- South Australian Certificate of Education
- Servizi Assicurativi del Commercio Estero (SACE SpA), Italian Export Credit Agency
- Southern Alliance for Clean Energy

== See also ==
- Supreme Allied Commander Europe (SACEUR)
