= Kouga Local Municipality elections =

Local elections in the Eastern Cape, South Africa

The Kouga Local Municipality council consists of thirty members elected by mixed-member proportional representation. Fifteen councillors are elected by first-past-the-post voting in fifteen wards, while the remaining fifteen are chosen from party lists so that the total number of party representatives is proportional to the number of votes received.

In the election of 4 November 2026, the Democratic Alliance (DA) won a majority of 18 seats.

== Results ==
The following table shows the composition of the council after past elections.

Event	ANC	DA	FF+	PA	Other	Total
2000 election	9	9	—	—	1	19
2002 floor-crossing	9	9	—	—	1	19
2004 floor-crossing	11	8	—	—	0	19
2006 election	11	6	0	—	3	20
2011 election	15	14	0	—	1	29
2016 election	12	17	0	0	0	29
2021 election	11	16	1	1	1	30
2026 election	8	18	1	2	1	30

== December 2000 election ==
Party	Ward			List			Total seats
Party	Votes	%	Seats	Votes	%	Seats	Total seats
African National Congress	8,702	45.61	5	9,408	49.38	4	9
Democratic Alliance	8,519	44.65	5	8,785	46.11	4	9
Independent candidates	1,048	5.49	0				0
Kouga 2000	465	2.44	0	459	2.41	1	1
African Christian Democratic Party	346	1.81	0	401	2.10	0	0
Total	19,080	100.00	10	19,053	100.00	9	19
Valid votes	19,080	97.91		19,053	97.81		
Invalid/blank votes	407	2.09		426	2.19		
Total votes	19,487	100.00		19,479	100.00		
Registered voters/turnout	31,773	61.33		31,773	61.31		

=== October 2002 floor crossing ===
In terms of the Eighth Amendment of the Constitution and the judgment of the Constitutional Court in United Democratic Movement v President of the Republic of South Africa and Others, in the period from 8–22 October 2002 councillors had the opportunity to cross the floor to a different political party without losing their seats. In the Kouga council, one councillor from the Democratic Alliance (DA) crossed to the New National Party (NNP), which had formerly been part of the DA, while the single councillor from Kouga 2000 crossed to the DA.

Party	Seats before	Net change	Seats after
African National Congress	9	0	9
Democratic Alliance	9	0	9
New National Party	–	▲1	1
Kouga 2000	1	▼1	0

=== By-elections from October 2002 to August 2004 ===
The following by-elections were held to fill vacant ward seats in the period between the floor crossing periods in October 2002 and September 2004.

Date	Ward	Party of the previous councillor	Party of the newly elected councillor
29 April 2004	5	Democratic Alliance	Democratic Alliance

=== September 2004 floor crossing ===
Another floor crossing period occurred on 1–15 September 2004, in which the NNP councillor and one DA councillor both crossed to the African National Congress (ANC).

Party	Seats before	Net change	Seats after
African National Congress	9	▲2	11
Democratic Alliance	9	▼1	8
New National Party	1	▼1	0

=== By-elections from September 2004 to February 2006 ===
The following by-elections were held to fill vacant ward seats in the period between the floor crossing period in September 2004 and the election in March 2006.

Date	Ward	Party of the previous councillor	Party of the newly elected councillor
22 September 2004	7	Democratic Alliance	Democratic Alliance

== March 2006 election ==
Party	Ward			List			Total seats
Party	Votes	%	Seats	Votes	%	Seats	Total seats
African National Congress	11,887	52.75	7	11,718	52.22	4	11
Democratic Alliance	6,921	30.71	3	7,020	31.28	3	6
Kouga 2000	1,476	6.55	0	1,367	6.09	1	1
Kouga Civic Alliance	1,215	5.39	0	1,212	5.40	1	1
Independent Democrats	480	2.13	0	479	2.13	1	1
African Christian Democratic Party	315	1.40	0	351	1.56	0	0
Freedom Front Plus	240	1.07	0	293	1.31	0	0
Total	22,534	100.00	10	22,440	100.00	10	20
Valid votes	22,534	98.24		22,440	97.94		
Invalid/blank votes	403	1.76		473	2.06		
Total votes	22,937	100.00		22,913	100.00		
Registered voters/turnout	39,395	58.22		39,395	58.16		

=== By-elections from March 2006 to May 2011 ===
The following by-elections were held to fill vacant ward seats in the period between the elections in March 2006 and May 2011.

Date	Ward	Party of the previous councillor	Party of the newly elected councillor
14 October 2009	6	African National Congress	African National Congress

== May 2011 election ==
Party	Ward			List			Total seats
Party	Votes	%	Seats	Votes	%	Seats	Total seats
African National Congress	16,607	47.89	9	17,184	50.17	6	15
Democratic Alliance	16,381	47.23	6	16,551	48.32	8	14
Independent candidates	1,129	3.26	0				0
Freedom Front Plus	286	0.82	0	240	0.70	0	0
Kouga 2000	241	0.69	0	245	0.72	0	0
South African Progressive Civic Organisation	36	0.10	0	32	0.09	0	0
Total	34,680	100.00	15	34,252	100.00	14	29
Valid votes	34,680	98.77		34,252	97.55		
Invalid/blank votes	433	1.23		861	2.45		
Total votes	35,113	100.00		35,113	100.00		
Registered voters/turnout	51,435	68.27		51,435	68.27		

=== By-elections from May 2011 to August 2016 ===
The following by-elections were held to fill vacant ward seats in the period between the elections in May 2011 and August 2016.

Date	Ward	Party of the previous councillor	Party of the newly elected councillor
27 November 2013	5	Democratic Alliance	Democratic Alliance
27 November 2013	9	African National Congress	African National Congress

== August 2016 election ==
Party	Ward			List			Total seats
Party	Votes	%	Seats	Votes	%	Seats	Total seats
Democratic Alliance	21,364	56.24	7	21,543	56.75	10	17
African National Congress	15,407	40.56	8	15,409	40.59	4	12
Economic Freedom Fighters	298	0.78	0	431	1.14	0	0
Freedom Front Plus	274	0.72	0	247	0.65	0	0
Independent candidates	399	1.05	0				0
African Christian Democratic Party	184	0.48	0	163	0.43	0	0
Patriotic Alliance	64	0.17	0	95	0.25	0	0
United Democratic Movement				72	0.19	0	0
Total	37,990	100.00	15	37,960	100.00	14	29
Valid votes	37,990	98.89		37,960	98.75		
Invalid/blank votes	426	1.11		481	1.25		
Total votes	38,416	100.00		38,441	100.00		
Registered voters/turnout	58,145	66.07		58,145	66.11		

=== By-elections from August 2016 to November 2021 ===
The following by-elections were held to fill vacant ward seats in the period between the elections in August 2016 and November 2021.

Date	Ward	Party of the previous councillor	Party of the newly elected councillor
13 December 2017	5	Democratic Alliance	Democratic Alliance
11 November 2020	2	African National Congress	African National Congress

== November 2021 election ==
Party	Ward			List			Total seats
Party	Votes	%	Seats	Votes	%	Seats	Total seats
Democratic Alliance	18,097	53.11	9	18,333	53.89	7	16
African National Congress	12,538	36.80	6	12,779	37.56	5	11
Freedom Front Plus	1,047	3.07	0	1,051	3.09	1	1
Patriotic Alliance	662	1.94	0	679	2.00	1	1
Economic Freedom Fighters	618	1.81	0	641	1.88	1	1
Independent candidates	833	2.44	0				0
United Democratic Movement	106	0.31	0	277	0.81	0	0
Good	107	0.31	0	134	0.39	0	0
Compatriots of South Africa	34	0.10	0	64	0.19	0	0
The Organic Humanity Movement	25	0.07	0	28	0.08	0	0
African Transformation Movement	5	0.01	0	36	0.11	0	0
Total	34,072	100.00	15	34,022	100.00	15	30
Valid votes	34,072	98.81		34,022	98.51		
Invalid/blank votes	410	1.19		513	1.49		
Total votes	34,482	100.00		34,535	100.00		
Registered voters/turnout	60,572	56.93		60,572	57.01		

=== By-elections from November 2021 ===
The following by-elections were held to fill vacant ward seats in the period since the election in November 2021.

Date	Ward	Party of the previous councillor	Party of the newly elected councillor
26 Nov 2025	2	Democratic Alliance	Democratic Alliance

== November 2026 election ==
The following are the results of the 2026 election.

Party	Ward			List			Total seats
Party	Votes	%	Seats	Votes	%	Seats	Total seats
Democratic Alliance	23,884	58.53	11	23,908	58.57	7	18
African National Congress	10,110	24.78	4	10,095	24.73	4	8
Patriotic Alliance	2,966	7.27	0	2,937	7.20	2	2
Freedom Front Plus	1,778	4.36	0	1,779	4.36	1	1
People's Movement for Change	617	1.51	0	630	1.54	1	1
South African Communist Party	556	1.36	0	533	1.31	0	0
Economic Freedom Fighters	464	1.14	0	470	1.15	0	0
African Christian Democratic Party	132	0.32	0	158	0.39	0	0
uMkhonto weSizwe Party	129	0.32	0	130	0.32	0	0
Khoisan Revolution	72	0.18	0	46	0.11	0	0
African Transformation Movement	33	0.08	0	75	0.18	0	0
Organic Humanity Movement	34	0.08	0	35	0.09	0	0
Afrika Mayibuye Movement	23	0.06	0	22	0.05	0	0
Azanian People's Organisation	8	0.02	0				0
Total	40,806	100.00	15	40,818	100.00	15	30
Valid votes	40,806	99.26		40,818	99.16		
Invalid/blank votes	305	0.74		344	0.84		
Total votes	41,111	100.00		41,162	100.00		
Registered voters/turnout	68,420	60.09		68,420	60.16		
