= Ninth Amendment of the Constitution of South Africa =

Modified apportionment

Constitution Ninth Amendment Act of 2002

Parliament of South Africa
- Long title: Act to amend the Constitution of the Republic of South Africa, 1996, in order to regulate the allocation of delegates to the National Council Provinces in the event of changes of party membership, mergers between parties, subdivision of parties or subdivision and merger of parties within a provincial legislature; and to provide for matters connected therewith.
- Enacted by: Parliament of South Africa
- Enacted: 19 June 2002
- Assented to: 19 June 2002
- Commenced: 20 June 2002

Legislative history
- Bill title: Constitution of the Republic of South Africa Second Amendment Bill
- Bill citation: B17D—2002
- Introduced by: Penuel Maduna, Minister of Justice and Constitutional Development
- Introduced: 19 April 2002

Amends
- Constitution of the Republic of South Africa, 1996

Amended by
- Citation of Constitutional Laws Act, 2005 (amended short title)

Repealed by
- Constitution Fourteenth Amendment Act of 2008 (effectively)

The Ninth Amendment of the Constitution of South Africa modified the scheme for the allocation of seats in the National Council of Provinces, to account for the possibility of changes in the party makeup of provincial legislatures. This was necessary because of other legislation which had been introduced to allow members of the provincial legislatures to cross the floor (move from one party to another) without losing their seats. It came into force on 20 June 2002, and was effectively repealed on 17 April 2009 by the Fourteenth Amendment.

== Provisions ==
The National Council of Provinces (NCOP) consists of ninety members, ten from each province. Seats in each province's delegation are allocated to parties in proportion to the seats held by the parties in the provincial legislature. Before the passage of the Ninth Amendment, seats in a provincial delegation were only re-allocated when a new provincial legislature was elected, and permanent delegates were appointed for a term that lasted until the next election of the provincial legislature.

The Loss or Retention of Membership of National and Provincial Legislatures Act, 2002, which was enacted at the same time as the Ninth Amendment, purported to allow members of the provincial legislatures to cross the floor at certain times without losing their seats. The Ninth Amendment consequently modified the constitution to provide that, if such floor-crossing occurs in a provincial legislature, then the seats in that province's NCOP delegation must be reallocated according to the new makeup of the legislature, and also that permanent delegates' terms of office expire when such a reallocation happens.

== Legislative history ==
The amendment was introduced to Parliament as the Constitution of the Republic of South Africa Second Amendment Bill, part of a package of four bills dealing with floor-crossing. The others were the Constitution of the Republic of South Africa Amendment Bill, which became the Eighth Amendment, the Loss or Retention of Membership of National and Provincial Legislatures Bill, mentioned above, and the Local Government: Municipal Structures Amendment Bill, which dealt with consequential effects of floor-crossing in municipal councils.

The bill was initially passed by the National Assembly on 11 June 2002 with 280 votes in favour, more than the requisite two-thirds majority. It was then passed with amendments by the NCOP on 18 June, with all nine provinces voting in favour. The amendments were approved by the National Assembly on 19 June with 287 votes in favour, and the bill was signed by President Thabo Mbeki on the same day. It came into force on the following day, at the same time as the other three floor-crossing acts.

On 4 October 2002, in the case of United Democratic Movement v President of the Republic of South Africa and Others, the Constitutional Court declared the Loss or Retention of Membership Act to be unconstitutional. This judgment had no effect on the Ninth Amendment, which remained in place notwithstanding that there could be no floor-crossing in the provincial legislatures. On 20 March 2003 the Tenth Amendment came into force, constitutionally enabling floor-crossing in national and provincial legislatures.

The changes made by the Ninth Amendment were repealed on 17 April 2009 by the Fourteenth Amendment.

== Formal title ==
The official short title of the amendment is "Constitution Ninth Amendment Act of 2002". It was originally titled "Constitution of the Republic of South Africa Second Amendment Act, 2002" and numbered as Act No. 21 of 2002, but the Citation of Constitutional Laws Act, 2005 renamed it and abolished the practice of giving Act numbers to constitutional amendments.
