= Second Amendment of the Constitution of South Africa =

Constitution Second Amendment Act of 1998

Parliament of South Africa
- Long title: Act to amend the Constitution of the Republic of South Africa, 1996, so as to extend the term of Municipal Councils; to provide for the designation of alternates in respect of certain members of the Judicial Service Commission; to amend the name of the Human Rights Commission; to adjust the powers of the Public Service Commission; and to extend and modify the application of transitional arrangements in respect of local government; and to provide for matters connected therewith.
- Enacted by: Parliament of South Africa
- Assented to: 28 September 1998
- Commenced: 7 October 1998

Legislative history
- Bill title: Constitution of the Republic of South Africa Amendment Bill
- Bill citation: B84—1998
- Introduced by: Valli Moosa, Minister of Provincial Affairs and Constitutional Development

Amends
- Constitution of the Republic of South Africa, 1996

Amended by
- Citation of Constitutional Laws Act, 2005 (amended short title)

The Second Amendment of the Constitution of South Africa extended the terms of municipal councils and made various changes relating to certain independent commissions. It was enacted by the Parliament of South Africa, and signed by President Mandela on 28 September 1998. It came into force on 7 October of the same year.

== Provisions ==
The Act made various changes to the Constitution:

- to extend the term of office of municipal councils from four years to five years, and modify the schedule for the process of transition to the post-apartheid municipal system.
- to allow for the designation of alternates to replace members of the Judicial Service Commission in the event of the members' unavailability.
- to give Parliament the ability to assign additional powers or functions to the Public Service Commission.
- to rename the Human Rights Commission to the South African Human Rights Commission.

== Formal title ==
The official short title of the amendment is "Constitution Second Amendment Act of 1998". It was originally titled "Constitution of the Republic of South Africa Amendment Act, 1998" and numbered as Act No. 65 of 1998, but the Citation of Constitutional Laws Act, 2005 renamed it and abolished the practice of giving Act numbers to constitutional amendments.
