= Seventh Amendment of the Constitution of South Africa =

Amendment regarding financial management of various levels of South Africa's government

Constitution Seventh Amendment Act of 2001

Parliament of South Africa
- Long title: Act to amend the Constitution of the Republic of South Africa, 1996, so as to provide for the introduction, only by the Cabinet member responsible for national financial matters, of certain financial legislation in the National Assembly; to extend the definition of a money Bill; to regulate the withholding of funds by the national treasury if organs of state commit a serious and material breach of legislation prescribing treasury norms and standards; to provide that the enactment of national framework legislation governing the policies of organs of state on preferential procurement should be obligatory; to provide for the enactment of national framework legislation in connection with the withdrawal of money as direct charges against a Provincial Revenue Fund and certain payments from a Provincial Revenue Fund to municipalities; to reduce the number of members of the Financial and Fiscal Commission and to change the appointment procedure; to make provision for provincial borrowing powers; and to provide for matters connected therewith.
- Enacted by: Parliament of South Africa
- Enacted: 15 November 2001
- Assented to: 7 December 2001
- Commenced: 26 April 2002; FFC provisions: 1 December 2003

Legislative history
- Bill title: Constitution of the Republic of South Africa Second Amendment Bill
- Bill citation: B78B—2001
- Introduced by: Penuel Maduna, Minister of Justice and Constitutional Development
- Introduced: 28 September 2001

Amends
- Constitution of the Republic of South Africa, 1996

Amended by
- Citation of Constitutional Laws Act, 2005 (amended short title)

The Seventh Amendment of the Constitution of South Africa made various changes involving the financial management of national and provincial government. Most of its provisions came into force on 26 April 2002, and the remainder on 1 December 2003.

== Provisions ==
The amendment made the following changes to the Constitution:

- Modifying the definition of a "money bill" for the national Parliament and the provincial legislatures.
- Providing that, along with money bills, bills determining the division of revenue between national, provincial and local government can only be introduced to Parliament by the Minister of Finance.
- Reducing the size of the Financial and Fiscal Commission from 22 members to nine members, by reducing the number of members chosen by the president from nine to two, and by replacing the nine members chosen by the nine provinces individually with three members chosen by the provinces collectively.
- Modifying the mechanisms whereby the national government can control the financial practises of the provincial governments.
- Various other technical modifications.

== Legislative history ==
The amendment was passed by the National Assembly on 1 November 2001 with the requisite two-thirds majority (274 votes in favour), and by the National Council of Provinces (NCOP) on 15 November with eight of nine provinces in favour, KwaZulu-Natal being the lone dissenter. It was introduced to Parliament simultaneously with the Sixth Amendment, but was passed separately because it contained matters affecting provincial government which had to be approved by the NCOP.

The act was signed by President Thabo Mbeki on 7 December, but it contained a clause specifying that it would only come into force on a date set by presidential proclamation. A proclamation on 26 April 2006 brought most of the act into force on that same day, except for those related to the Financial and Fiscal Commission, which only came into force on 1 December 2003.

== Formal title ==
The official short title of the amendment is "Constitution Seventh Amendment Act of 2001". It was originally titled "Constitution of the Republic of South Africa Second Amendment Act, 2001" and numbered as Act No. 61 of 2001, but the Citation of Constitutional Laws Act, 2005 renamed it and abolished the practice of giving Act numbers to constitutional amendments.
