= First Amendment of the Constitution of South Africa =

Constitution First Amendment Act of 1997

Parliament of South Africa
- Long title: Act to amend the Constitution of the Republic of South Africa, 1996, so as to make further provision in relation to the oath sworn or affirmation made by an Acting President; to extend the cut-off date in respect of the granting of amnesty; and to provide for matters connected therewith.
- Enacted by: Parliament of South Africa
- Assented to: 28 August 1997
- Commenced: 4 February 1997 (retroactively)

Legislative history
- Bill title: Constitution of the Republic of South Africa Amendment Bill
- Bill citation: B49—1997
- Introduced by: Valli Moosa, Minister of Provincial Affairs and Constitutional Development

Amends
- Constitution of the Republic of South Africa, 1996

Amended by
- Citation of Constitutional Laws Act, 2005 (amended short title)

The First Amendment of the Constitution of South Africa made changes related to the oath of office of the Acting President and to the jurisdiction of the Truth and Reconciliation Commission. It was enacted by the Parliament of South Africa, and signed by President Mandela on 28 August 1997. However it was deemed to come into effect retroactively, from 4 February 1997, the date when the constitution itself came into force.

== Provisions ==
The Act made three technical modifications to the Constitution:

- to provide that a person who serves as Acting President of the Republic more than once during a single presidential term only has to swear the oath of office the first time that they become Acting President.
- to allow the President of the Constitutional Court (now known as the Chief Justice) to designate another judge to administer the oath of office to the President or Acting President, rather than administering it personally.
- to extend the cut-off date for actions for which amnesty could be granted by the Truth and Reconciliation Commission, changing it from 6 December 1993 to 11 May 1994.

This last change allowed the TRC to deal with various violent events, particularly the Bophuthatswana coup d'état and its aftermath, that had occurred in the run-up to the 1994 general elections.

== Formal title ==
The official short title of the amendment is "Constitution First Amendment Act of 1997". It was originally titled "Constitution of the Republic of South Africa Amendment Act, 1997" and numbered as Act No. 35 of 1997, but the Citation of Constitutional Laws Act, 2005 renamed it and abolished the practice of giving Act numbers to constitutional amendments.
