= Fifth Amendment of the Constitution of South Africa =

Amendment of the South African constitution

Constitution Fifth Amendment Act of 1999

Parliament of South Africa
- Long title: Act to amend the Constitution of the Republic of South Africa, 1996, so as to allow a proclamation calling and setting dates for an election of the National Assembly to be issued either before or after the expiry of the term of the National Assembly; and to dispense with the requirement that the chairperson and deputy chairperson of the Financial and Fiscal Commission must be full-time members of the Commission; and to provide for matters connected therewith.
- Enacted by: Parliament of South Africa
- Assented to: 17 March 1999
- Commenced: 19 March 1999

Legislative history
- Bill title: Constitution of the Republic of South Africa Fourth Amendment Bill
- Bill citation: B124—1998
- Introduced by: Valli Moosa, Minister of Provincial Affairs and Constitutional Development

Amends
- Constitution of the Republic of South Africa, 1996

Amended by
- Citation of Constitutional Laws Act, 2005 (amended short title)

The Fifth Amendment of the Constitution of South Africa made two technical changes, one relating to national election procedures and the other to the membership of the Financial and Fiscal Commission. It was enacted by the Parliament of South Africa, signed by Acting President Thabo Mbeki on 17 March 1999, and came into force two days later. It was signed and came into force simultaneously with the Fourth Amendment; the two amendments were separated because the Fourth involved provincial matters and had to be passed by the National Council of Provinces while the Fifth did not.

== Provisions ==
The Act made two technical modifications to the Constitution. The first was to clarify that, when the term of the National Assembly is due to expire, the President may issue the proclamation calling an election either before or after the term actually expires. The Fourth Amendment made the same change for elections to provincial legislatures. The second was to allow that the chairperson and deputy chairperson of the Financial and Fiscal Commission need not necessarily be permanent members of the commission.

== Formal title ==
The official short title of the amendment is "Constitution Fifth Amendment Act of 1999". It was originally titled "Constitution of the Republic of South Africa Fifth Amendment Act, 1999" and numbered as Act No. 2 of 1999, but the Citation of Constitutional Laws Act, 2005 renamed it and abolished the practice of giving Act numbers to constitutional amendments.
