= Fourth Amendment of the Constitution of South Africa =

Constitution Fourth Amendment Act of 1999

Parliament of South Africa
- Long title: Act to amend the Constitution of the Republic of South Africa, 1996, so as to enable a proclamation calling and setting dates for an election of a provincial legislature to be issued either before or after the expiry of the term of that legislature; and to provide for the allocation of undistributed delegates in a provincial delegation to the National Council of Provinces in a case where competing surpluses are equal; and to provide for matters connected therewith.
- Enacted by: Parliament of South Africa
- Assented to: 17 March 1999
- Commenced: 19 March 1999

Legislative history
- Bill title: Constitution of the Republic of South Africa Third Amendment Bill
- Bill citation: B123—1998
- Introduced by: Valli Moosa, Minister of Provincial Affairs and Constitutional Development

Amends
- Constitution of the Republic of South Africa, 1996

Amended by
- Citation of Constitutional Laws Act, 2005 (amended short title)

The Fourth Amendment of the Constitution of South Africa made two technical changes relating to the calling of provincial elections and the choice of delegates to the National Council of Provinces. It was enacted by the Parliament of South Africa, signed by Acting President Thabo Mbeki on 17 March 1999, and came into force two days later. It was signed and came into force simultaneously with the Fifth Amendment; the two amendments were separated because the Fourth involved provincial matters and had to be passed by the National Council of Provinces while the Fifth did not.

== Provisions ==
The Act made two technical modifications to the Constitution. The first was to clarify that, when the term of a provincial legislature is due to expire, the Premier may issue the proclamation calling an election either before or after the term actually expires. The Fifth Amendment made the same change for elections to the National Assembly. The second was to modify the formula for the allocation of delegates' seats in the National Council of Provinces to parties.

== Formal title ==
The official short title of the amendment is "Constitution Fourth Amendment Act of 1999". It was originally titled "Constitution of the Republic of South Africa Amendment Act, 1999" and numbered as Act No. 3 of 1999, but the Citation of Constitutional Laws Act, 2005 renamed it and abolished the practice of giving Act numbers to constitutional amendments.
