= South African Council for Educators =

- Established: 1995
- Headquarters: Gauteng, South Africa
- Affiliations: sadtu
- Website: www.sace.org.za

South African Council for Educators (acronym SACE) professional body for teaching. SACE was established in 1995 in terms of the SACE Act no. 31 of 2000, with an aim to "enhance the status of the teaching profession through appropriate Registration, management of Professional Development and inculcation of a Code of Ethics for all educators."

== Functions ==
In line with the aims set in Act No. 31 of 2000: The South African Council for Educators Act, SACE has three principal functions:

Maintaining registration of teachers in South Africa

SACE is responsible for registering all qualified educators in South Africa. This registration ensures that educators meet the required professional standards and are eligible to practice as teachers in the country.<

Code of professional ethics

SACE is also responsible for making sure teachers uphold the code of conducts. The council develops and enforces a code of professional ethics and conduct for educators. These code outlines the responsibilities and standards of behavior expected from teachers, promoting professionalism and integrity within the teaching profession.

Disciplinary hearings

The council also has the authority to investigate and conduct disciplinary hearings for cases involving professional misconduct by educators (these include allegations of negligence, abuse, or any behavior that goes against their code of professional ethics).

== Legal requirement ==
The council has a series of panels that investigate cases about fitness to teach (Code of Professional Ethics), and registration of individual teachers - with Background check conducted.

Being fully registered with the SACE for educators is a legal requirement in South African school (Public/ private schools educators).

== See also ==
- Education in South Africa
- South African Council for Educators Act, 2000
- Special education
- University of South Africa
