= Mental Health Care Act, 2002 =

South African law

Parliament of South Africa
- Long title: To provide for the care, treatment and rehabilitation of persons who are mentally ill; to set out different procedures to be followed in the admission of such persons; to establish Review Boards in respect of every health establishment; to determine their powers and functions; to provide for the care and administration of the property of mentally ill persons; to repeal certain laws; and to provide for matters connected therewith.
- Assented to: 28 October 2002
- Commenced: 15 December 2004
- Status: In force (amended)

The Mental Health Care Act, 2002 (Act No. 17 of 2002) (MHCA) is an act of the Parliament of South Africa that regulates mental healthcare.

== Adoption ==
The act received assent on 28 October 2002 and commenced on 15 December 2004.

The Mental Health Act, 1973 was repealed in its entirety by the Mental Health Care Act, 2002.

== Provisions ==
The Act promotes treatment in the least restrictive environment with active integration into general healthcare being required.

Section 10 of the MHCA contains a prohibition against unfair discrimination against mental health care users on the grounds of their mental health status, which is one of the major objectives of the MHCA. That provision is an extension of the protection of equality as provided for in Section 9 of the Constitution.
