= South African Council for Educators Act, 2000 =

South African legislation

The South African Council for Educators (SACE) Act 31 of 2000

Parliament of South Africa
- Long title: "An Act to provide for the establishment of the South African Council for Educators as a juristic person;to determine its objects, functions, and powers; to provide for the admission and registration of educators; to provide for the professionalization of teaching; to provide for the appointment of a Registrar and other employees of the Council; to provide for governance by the Council; to provide for discipline of educators and to regulate the teaching profession."
- Citation: Act No. 31 of 2000
- Enacted by: Parliament of South Africa
- Assented to: 31 July 2000

Amended by
- The South Africa Council for Educators Amendment Act of 2005; The South Africa Council for Educators Amendment Act of 2013.
- Status: In force

The South African Council for Educators (SACE) Act 31 of 2000, is a legislation enacted in South Africa to regulate the teaching profession and ensure professional conduct among educators in the country. The act was signed into law by President Thabo Mbeki in October 2000.

The primary objectives of the South Africa Council of Education (SACE) section 31 Act of 2000 is to:

- To establish the South African Council for Educators as a professional body for educators in South Africa.
- To promote professional development and growth of educators.
- To set professional standards for educators.
- To establish a code of conduct for educators that promotes ethical practices and professionalism.
- To regulate the registration, professional conduct, and discipline of educators.

== Amendment ==
2005 amendment of the law introduced changes to the composition of the SACE council, allowing for broader representation of different sectors within the education industry. It also expanded the functions of SACE, including the development of teaching standards and the promotion of research in education. The South Africa Council for Educators amendment Act of 2013, strengthened the disciplinary procedures for educators, introducing a more streamlined process for handling complaints and imposing stricter penalties for professional misconduct.

== Impact ==
The South Africa Council for Educators Act of 2000 had a significant impact on the certification and regulation of educators in South Africa. The certificate obtained through compliance with the Act ensures that educators meet the necessary qualifications, contributes to professional development, enhances accountability, and promotes ethical conduct within the teaching profession.

== See also ==
- SACE
