= Eleventh Amendment of the Constitution of South Africa =

Constitution Eleventh Amendment Act of 2003

Parliament of South Africa
- Long title: Act to amend the Constitution of the Republic of South Africa, 1996, so as to provide for Bills regulating certain financial matters to be dealt with in terms of section 76 (1) of the Constitution; to change the name of the Northern Province to Limpopo; to further regulate provincial intervention in local government; and to further regulate the process of review by the National Council of Provinces where there has been national executive intervention in provincial government and provincial executive intervention in local government; and to provide for matters connected therewith.
- Enacted by: Parliament of South Africa
- Enacted: 25 March 2003
- Assented to: 9 April 2003
- Commenced: 11 July 2003

Legislative history
- Bill title: Constitution of the Republic of South Africa Third Amendment Bill
- Bill citation: B33B—2002
- Introduced by: Penuel Maduna, Minister of Justice and Constitutional Development
- Introduced: 14 August 2002

Amends
- Constitution of the Republic of South Africa, 1996

Amended by
- Citation of Constitutional Laws Act, 2005 (amended short title)

The Eleventh Amendment of the Constitution of South Africa renamed the Northern Province to Limpopo, altered the procedure for intervention by the national government in a failing provincial government and intervention by a provincial government in a failing municipality, and expanded the powers of the provincial executive when it intervenes in a municipality.

The bill was passed by the National Assembly on 25 February 2003 with 305 votes in favour, more than the required two-thirds majority, and by the National Council of Provinces on 25 March with all nine provinces in favour. It was signed by President Thabo Mbeki on 9 April, and came into force on 11 July.

== Formal title ==
The official short title of the amendment is "Constitution Eleventh Amendment Act of 2003". It was originally titled "Constitution of the Republic of South Africa Second Amendment Act, 2003" and numbered as Act No. 3 of 2003, but the Citation of Constitutional Laws Act, 2005 renamed it and abolished the practice of giving Act numbers to constitutional amendments.
