= Citation of Constitutional Laws Act, 2005 =

Act of the Parliament of South Africa

Parliament of South Africa
- Long title: Act to change the manner of referring to the Constitution of the Republic of South Africa, 1996, and to laws amending it; to substitute the short titles of laws amending the Constitution of the Republic of South Africa, 1996; and to provide for matters connected therewith.
- Citation: Act No. 5 of 2005
- Enacted by: Parliament of South Africa
- Assented to: 23 June 2005
- Commenced: 27 June 2005

Legislative history
- Bill title: Citation of Constitutional Laws Bill
- Bill citation: B5—2005
- Introduced by: Brigitte Mabandla, Minister of Justice and Constitutional Development
- Introduced: 10 February 2005
- Status: In force

The Citation of Constitutional Laws Act, 2005 (Act No. 5 of 2005) is an act of the Parliament of South Africa which altered the way in which the Constitution and its amendments are numbered and referred to.

An ordinary act of Parliament is referred to by the year in which it is passed and an identifying number within that year; the identifying number is allocated by the Presidency when the act is signed by the President. The Constitution was originally numbered as "Act No. 108 of 1996". Various jurists, including Chief Justice Arthur Chaskalson, expressed the opinion that the Constitution should not be treated as an ordinary act of Parliament, because it was enacted by the Constitutional Assembly rather than by Parliament and because it was supreme over all other law. The Citation of Constitutional Laws Act put this suggestion into effect, removing the Constitution's act number and determining that it was to be referred to only by its title, "Constitution of the Republic of South Africa, 1996".

The act also dealt similarly with the eleven (at the time) acts amending the constitution. They had originally been given titles of the form "Constitution of the Republic of South Africa [Second] Amendment Act, [year]" and act numbers in the ordinary sequence. The Citation Act removed their act numbers, and retitled them in a single chronological sequence. The following table makes it clear:

Old act no.	Old title	New title
35 of 1997	Constitution of the Republic of South Africa Amendment Act, 1997	Constitution First Amendment Act of 1997
65 of 1998	Constitution of the Republic of South Africa Amendment Act, 1998	Constitution Second Amendment Act of 1998
87 of 1998	Constitution of the Republic of South Africa Second Amendment Act, 1998	Constitution Third Amendment Act of 1998
3 of 1999	Constitution of the Republic of South Africa Amendment Act, 1999	Constitution Fourth Amendment Act of 1999
2 of 1999	Constitution of the Republic of South Africa Second Amendment Act, 1999	Constitution Fifth Amendment Act of 1999
34 of 2001	Constitution of the Republic of South Africa Amendment Act, 2001	Constitution Sixth Amendment Act of 2001
61 of 2001	Constitution of the Republic of South Africa Second Amendment Act, 2001	Constitution Seventh Amendment Act of 2001
18 of 2002	Constitution of the Republic of South Africa Amendment Act, 2002	Constitution Eighth Amendment Act of 2002
21 of 2002	Constitution of the Republic of South Africa Second Amendment Act, 2002	Constitution Ninth Amendment Act of 2002
2 of 2003	Constitution of the Republic of South Africa Amendment Act, 2003	Constitution Tenth Amendment Act of 2003
3 of 2003	Constitution of the Republic of South Africa Second Amendment Act, 2003	Constitution Eleventh Amendment Act of 2003

It also decreed that subsequent constitutional amendment acts should be named similarly.
