= Tenth Amendment of the Constitution of South Africa =

Constitution Tenth Amendment Act of 2003

Parliament of South Africa
- Long title: Act to amend the Constitution of the Republic of South Africa, 1996, so as to enable a member of the National Assembly or a provincial legislature to become a member of another party whilst retaining membership of the National Assembly or that provincial legislature; to enable an existing party to merge with another party, or to subdivide into more than one party, or to subdivide and to permit any of the subdivisions to merge with another party, whilst allowing a member of a legislature affected by such changes to retain membership of that legislature; and to provide for matters connected therewith.
- Enacted by: Parliament of South Africa
- Enacted: 18 March 2003
- Assented to: 19 March 2003
- Commenced: 20 March 2003

Legislative history
- Bill title: Constitution of the Republic of South Africa Fourth Amendment Bill
- Bill citation: B69B—2002
- Introduced by: Penuel Maduna, Minister of Justice and Constitutional Development
- Introduced: 12 November 2002

Amends
- Constitution of the Republic of South Africa, 1996

Amended by
- Citation of Constitutional Laws Act, 2005 (amended short title)

Repealed by
- Constitution Fourteenth and Fifteenth Amendment Acts of 2008 (effectively)

The Tenth Amendment of the Constitution of South Africa altered the provisions relating to membership of the National Assembly and the provincial legislatures, to allow members of those bodies to cross the floor (move from one party to another) at certain times without losing their seats. It came into force on 20 March 2003, and was effectively repealed on 17 March 2009 by the Fourteenth and Fifteenth Amendments.

== Provisions ==
The amendment renumbered the constitution's existing Schedule 6A (inserted by the Eighth Amendment and dealing with municipal floor-crossing) to Schedule 6B, and inserted a new Schedule 6A, entitled "Retention of membership of National Assembly or provincial legislature, after a change of party membership, mergers between parties, subdivision of parties and subdivision and merger of parties". This schedule allowed MPs and MPLs to cross the floor without losing their seats, but only during certain window periods. Representatives could also only cross the floor if at least one-tenth of the representatives of the party they were leaving did so during the same period.

The permitted floor-crossing periods for were to occur from the first to the fifteenth of September in the second and fourth years after each election of the legislature; such elections occur every five years. One was also to occur in the fifteen days immediately after the amendment came into force. The floor-crossing periods that occurred before repeal were therefore 21 March–4 April 2003, 1–15 September 2005, and 1–15 September 2007.

== Legislative history ==
Parliament had previously attempted to allow floor-crossing by passing the Loss or Retention of Membership of National and Provincial Legislatures Act, 2002, an ordinary act rather than a constitutional amendment. On 4 October 2002, in the case of United Democratic Movement v President of the Republic of South Africa and Others, the Constitutional Court declared it to be unconstitutional. A week later a draft of the Constitution of the Republic of South Africa Fourth Amendment Bill was published.

The bill was passed by the National Assembly on 25 February 2003 with 300 votes in favour, more than the required two-thirds majority. It was then passed by the National Council of Provinces on 18 March, with all nine provinces voting in favour. It was signed by President Thabo Mbeki on 19 March, and came into force on the following day.

The changes made by the Tenth Amendment were repealed on 17 April 2009 by the Fourteenth and Fifteenth Amendments.

== Formal title ==
The official short title of the amendment is "Constitution Tenth Amendment Act of 2003". It was originally titled "Constitution of the Republic of South Africa Amendment Act, 2003" and numbered as Act No. 2 of 2003, but the Citation of Constitutional Laws Act, 2005 renamed it and abolished the practice of giving Act numbers to constitutional amendments.
