= Sixth Amendment of the Constitution of South Africa =

Constitution Sixth Amendment Act of 2001

Parliament of South Africa
- Long title: Act to amend the Constitution of the Republic of South Africa, 1996, so as to change the title of the President of the Constitutional Court to that of Chief Justice; to provide for the offices of Deputy Chief Justice, President of the Supreme Court of Appeal and Deputy President of the Supreme Court of Appeal; to provide for the extension of the term of office of a Constitutional Court judge; to further regulate the appointment of Deputy Ministers; to make provision for municipal borrowing powers and to enable a Municipal Council to bind itself and a future Council in the exercise of its legislative and executive authority to secure loans or investments for the municipality; and to provide for matters connected therewith.
- Enacted by: Parliament of South Africa
- Enacted: 1 November 2001
- Assented to: 20 November 2001
- Commenced: 21 November 2001

Legislative history
- Bill title: Constitution of the Republic of South Africa Amendment Bill
- Bill citation: B68B—2001
- Introduced by: Penuel Maduna, Minister of Justice and Constitutional Development
- Introduced: 12 September 2001

Amends
- Constitution of the Republic of South Africa, 1996

Amended by
- Citation of Constitutional Laws Act, 2005 (amended short title)

The Sixth Amendment of the Constitution of South Africa made a number of changes, most importantly giving the title of "Chief Justice" to the head of the Constitutional Court instead of the head of the Supreme Court of Appeal. It was passed by the National Assembly with the requisite two-thirds majority (279 votes in favour) on 1 November 2001, and signed by President Thabo Mbeki on 20 November; it was published and came into force on the following day.

== Provisions ==
The amendment renamed the post of "Chief Justice" to "President of the Supreme Court of Appeal", and the post of "President of the Constitutional Court" to "Chief Justice of South Africa"; the deputy heads of each court were also renamed similarly. These changes were intended to clarify the structure of the South African judiciary. Previously, the President of the Constitutional Court was responsible for various constitutional responsibilities, such as calling the first session of Parliament after an election and presiding over the election of the President at that session, while the Chief Justice was responsible for judicial administration, including for example chairing the Judicial Service Commission. These responsibilities were merged into a single post, reflecting the pre-eminence of the Constitutional Court at the apex of the court system. Consequentially many provisions of the Constitution had to be amended where they made reference to the President of the Constitutional Court.

Other changes made by the amendment were:

- to allow the term of office of a Constitutional Court judge – usually twelve years or until the judge reaches the age of seventy, whichever is shorter – to be extended by an Act of Parliament.
- to allow the President to appoint two Deputy Ministers from outside the National Assembly, where previously Deputy Ministers had to be members of the Assembly.
- to allow municipal councils to bind the authority of future successor councils, as security for a loan.

== Formal title ==
The official short title of the amendment is "Constitution Sixth Amendment Act of 2001". It was originally titled "Constitution of the Republic of South Africa Amendment Act, 2001" and numbered as Act No. 34 of 2001, but the Citation of Constitutional Laws Act, 2005 renamed it and abolished the practice of giving Act numbers to constitutional amendments.
