= Fourteenth Amendment of the Constitution of South Africa =

Amendment of South African constitution

Constitution Fourteenth Amendment Act of 2008

Parliament of South Africa
- Long title: Act to amend the Constitution of the Republic of South Africa, 1996, so as to further regulate the determination of political party participation in provincial delegations to the National Council of Provinces; and abolish the right of a member of the National Assembly or a provincial legislature to become a member of another political party whilst retaining membership of the National Assembly or that provincial legislature; and of an existing political party to merge with another political party, or to subdivide into more than one political party, or to subdivide and to permit any of the subdivisions to merge with another political party, whilst allowing a member of the National Assembly or a provincial legislature affected by such changes to retain membership of the National Assembly or that provincial legislature; and to provide for matters connected therewith.
- Enacted by: Parliament of South Africa
- Enacted: 19 November 2008
- Assented to: 6 January 2009
- Commenced: 17 April 2009

Legislative history
- Bill title: Constitution Fourteenth Amendment Bill
- Bill citation: B62B—2008
- Introduced by: Brigitte Mabandla, Minister of Justice and Constitutional Development
- Introduced: 2 July 2008

Amends
- Constitution of the Republic of South Africa, 1996

Repeals
- Constitution Ninth Amendment Act of 2002, Constitution Tenth Amendment Act of 2003 (effectively)

The Fourteenth Amendment of the Constitution of South Africa (formally the Constitution Fourteenth Amendment Act of 2008) repealed some of the provisions inserted into the Constitution by the Ninth and Tenth Amendments which allowed for floor-crossing, that is, allowed members of legislative bodies to move from one political party to another without losing their seats. The remaining floor-crossing provisions were repealed by the Fifteenth Amendment, which was enacted at the same time.

The Fourteenth Amendment contained the repeal provisions which affected the provincial legislatures and the National Council of Provinces (NCOP), and therefore had to be approved by six of nine provinces in the NCOP as well as by two-thirds of the National Assembly, while the Fifteenth Amendment contained the remaining provisions which only had to be approved by the Assembly. The bills for both amendments were passed by the National Assembly on 20 August 2008, with the Fourteenth Amendment receiving 310 votes in favour and none opposed. The bill for the Fourteenth Amendment was passed by the NCOP on 19 November 2008 with all nine provinces voting in favour. Both amendments were signed by President Kgalema Motlanthe on 6 January 2009, and came into force on 17 April 2009, days before the 2009 general election.
