= Eighth Amendment of the Constitution of South Africa =

Constitution Eighth Amendment Act of 2002

Parliament of South Africa
- Long title: Act to amend the Constitution of the Republic of South Africa, 1996, so as to enable a member of a Municipal Council to become a member of another party whilst retaining membership of that Council; to enable an existing party to merge with another party, or to subdivide into more than one party, or to subdivide and any one of the subdivisions to merge with another party, whilst allowing a member of a Council affected by such changes to retain membership of that Council; and to provide for matters connected therewith.
- Enacted by: Parliament of South Africa
- Enacted: 11 June 2002
- Assented to: 19 June 2002
- Commenced: 20 June 2002

Legislative history
- Bill title: Constitution of the Republic of South Africa Amendment Bill
- Bill citation: B16B—2002
- Introduced by: Penuel Maduna, Minister of Justice and Constitutional Development
- Introduced: 19 April 2002

Amends
- Constitution of the Republic of South Africa, 1996

Amended by
- Citation of Constitutional Laws Act, 2005 (amended short title)

Repealed by
- Constitution Fifteenth Amendment Act of 2008 (effectively)

The Eighth Amendment of the Constitution of South Africa allowed members of municipal councils to cross the floor from one political party to another without losing their seats. It came into force on 20 June 2002, and was effectively repealed on 17 April 2009 by the Fifteenth Amendment.

== Provisions ==
The amendment inserted Schedule 6A, entitled "Loss or retention of membership of Municipal Councils, after a change of party membership, mergers between parties, subdivision of parties and subdivision and merger of parties, and filling of vacancies", into the constitution. This schedule allowed municipal councillors to cross the floor without losing their seats, but only during certain window periods. Councillors could also only cross the floor if at least one-tenth of the representatives of the party they were leaving did so during the same period.

The permitted floor-crossing periods were to occur from the first to the fifteenth of September in the second and fourth years after each nationwide municipal election; such elections occur every five years. One was also to occur in the fifteen days immediately after the amendment came into force, but as a result of a court challenge this period was suspended until October. The floor-crossing periods that occurred before repeal were therefore 8–22 October 2002, 1–15 September 2004, and 1–15 September 2007.

== Legislative history ==
The amendment was introduced to Parliament as the Constitution of the Republic of South Africa Amendment Bill, part of a package of four bills dealing with floor-crossing. The others were the Constitution of the Republic of South Africa Second Amendment Bill, which became the Ninth Amendment, the Loss or Retention of Membership of National and Provincial Legislatures Bill, which purported to allow floor-crossing in the national and provincial legislatures, and the Local Government: Municipal Structures Amendment Bill, which dealt with consequential effects of municipal floor-crossing.

The amendment was passed by the National Assembly on 11 June 2002 with 280 votes in favour, more than the requisite two-thirds majority. As a constitutional amendment not involving provincial matters, it did not have to be passed by the National Council of Provinces. It was signed by President Thabo Mbeki on 19 June and came into force on the following day, at the same time as the Ninth Amendment.

The provisions inserted by the Eighth Amendment were repealed on 17 April 2009 by the Fifteenth Amendment.

== Formal title ==
The official short title of the amendment is "Constitution Eighth Amendment Act of 2002". It was originally titled "Constitution of the Republic of South Africa Amendment Act, 2002" and numbered as Act No. 18 of 2002, but the Citation of Constitutional Laws Act, 2005 renamed it and abolished the practice of giving Act numbers to constitutional amendments.
