= 2016 in South African television =

List of years in South African television
- … 2006; 2007; 2008; 2009; 2010; 2011; 2012; 2013; 2014; 2015; 2016; 2017; 2018; 2019; 2020; 2021; 2022; 2023; 2024; 2025; 2026 …
- Art; Archaeology; Architecture; Literature; Music; Philosophy; Science; +...

This is a list of South African television-related events in 2016.

== Events ==
- 22 May - Richard Stirton wins the first season of The Voice South Africa.
- 6 November - Kryptonite Dance Academy win the seventh season of SA's Got Talent.

== Debuts ==
=== Domestic ===
- 31 January - The Voice South Africa (M-Net) (2016–present)

=== International ===
- 1 January - (United States) Zoo (M-Net)
- 19 January - (United States) Billions (M-Net Edge)
- 27 January - (United States) Lucifer (M-Net Edge)
- 17 March - (United States) Limitless (M-Net)
- 6 May - (United States) Angie Tribeca (M-Net Edge)
- 30 May - (United States) The Catch (M-Net)
- 15 June - (United States) The Art of More (M-Net Edge)
- 22 June - (United States) The Family (M-Net Edge)
- 6 July - (France) / (United States) / (Belgium) Popples (2015) (eToonz)
- 2 August - (United States) / (Canada) My Little Pony: Friendship is Magic (Nicktoons)
- 8 September - (United States) Of Kings and Prophets (M-Net Edge)
- 26 September - (United Kingdom) / (Canada) Counterfeit Cat (Disney XD)
- (United Kingdom) Messy Goes to Okido (SABC3)
- (United States) The Loud House (Nickelodeon)

=== Changes of network affiliation ===
Shows	Moved from	Moved to
(United States) The Catch	M-Net	M-Net City
(United States) Limitless	M-Net	M-Net City
(United States) Battle Creek	M-Net	M-Net City
(United States) / (Canada) My Little Pony: Friendship is Magic	Nicktoons	e.tv
(United States) Elementary	M-Net Edge	M-Net City
(United States) The Affair	M-Net Edge	M-Net City
(United States) The Following	M-Net Edge	M-Net City
(United States) The Family	M-Net Edge	M-Net City
(United States) Mozart in the Jungle	M-Net Edge	M-Net City
(Canada) / (Republic of Ireland) Vikings	M-Net Edge	M-Net City
(United States) Full Circle	M-Net Series Showcase	M-Net Edge
(United States) Californication	M-Net Series Showcase	M-Net Edge
(Australia) Wentworth	M-Net Series Showcase	M-Net Edge
(United States) Curb Your Enthusiasm	e.tv	M-Net Edge
(United States) Modern Family	M-Net City	M-Net Family
(United States) The Last Ship	M-Net City	M-Net Family

== Television shows ==
=== 1980s ===
- Good Morning South Africa (1985–present)
- Carte Blanche (1988–present)

=== 1990s ===
- Top Billing (1992–present)
- Generations (1994–present)
- Isidingo (1998–present)

=== 2000s ===
- Idols South Africa (2002–present)
- Rhythm City (2007–present)
- SA's Got Talent (2009–present)

== New channels ==
- 1 July: Boomerang
- 1 July: Cartoon Network Africa

== See also ==
- 2016 in South Africa
