= 2015 in South African television =

This is a list of South African television-related events in 2015.

== Events ==
- 10 March – SABC reporter Vuyo Mvoko is mugged live on camera as he is about to present a report from outside Johannesburg's Milpark Hospital about the health of Zambian President Edgar Lungu, who had been admitted to the clinic for tests following a collapse two days earlier.
- 17 May - Ace Khumalo and Ntombi Tshabalala win the fourth season of Big Brother.
- 7 August - Afrikaans singer Karlien van Jaarsveld and her partner Devon Snell win the eighth season of Strictly Come Dancing.
- 8 November - 3-year-old DJ Arch Jnr wins the sixth season of SA's Got Talent. He would be the youngest winner of a Got Talent competition of all-time until drummer Hugo Molina won Got Talent España in 2019.
- 22 November - Karabo Morgane wins the eleventh season of Idols South Africa.

== Debuts ==
=== International ===
- 7 January - (United States) The Affair (M-Net Edge)
- 9 January - (United States) Agent Carter (M-Net)
- 12 January - (United States) Dominion (M-Net Edge)
- 12 January - (United States) Benched (Vuzu)
- 15 January - (United States) Selfie (Vuzu Amp)
- 9 February - (United States) The Strain (Fox)
- 4 March - (United States) Empire (Fox)
- 12 March - (United States) Fresh Off the Boat (Fox)
- 16 March - (United States) 12 Monkeys (M-Net Edge)
- 18 March - (United States) Girlfriends' Guide to Divorce (M-Net Edge)
- 25 March - (United States) CSI: Cyber (M-Net)
- 2 April - (United States) NCIS: New Orleans (M-Net)
- 3 April - (United States) Mozart in the Jungle (M-Net Edge)
- 29 April - (United States) Better Call Saul (M-Net Edge)
- 14 May - (United States) Wayward Pines (Fox)
- 19 May - (United States) Undateable (Vuzu Amp)
- 30 May - (United States) The Odd Couple (2015) (M-Net)
- 3 June - (United States) Marry Me (Vuzu Amp)
- 9 June - (United States) Battle Creek (M-Net)
- 26 June - (United States) Bella and the Bulldogs (Nickelodeon)
- 29 June - (United States) Bad Judge (Vuzu Amp)
- 29 June - (United States) Madam Secretary (M-Net)
- 9 July - (United States) Lip Sync Battle (MTV Africa)
- 4 August - (United States) Mr. Robot (M-Net)
- 6 August - (United States) Galavant (Vuzu Amp)
- 27 August - (United States) Constantine (Vuzu Amp)
- 28 August - (United States) Allegiance (M-Net Edge)
- 28 August - (United States) The Whispers (M-Net)
- 2 September - (United States) Odd Mom Out (M-Net Edge)
- 9 September - (United States) Clipped (M-Net)
- 7 October - (United States) The Carmichael Show (Vuzu Amp)
- 12 October - (United States) Power (Vuzu Amp)
- 14 October - (United States) Blindspot (M-Net)
- 14 October - (United States) Aquarius (M-Net Edge)
- 22 October - (United States) Truth Be Told (2015) (Vuzu Amp)
- 23 October - (United States) Transparent (M-Net Edge)
- 26 October - (United States) Helix (M-Net Edge)
- 29 October - (United States) Supergirl (Vuzu Amp)
- 24 November - (United States) Chicago Med (M-Net)
- 30 November - (United States) The Astronaut Wives Club (M-Net)
- 7 December - (United States) Agent X (M-Net)
- 10 December - (United States) Halt and Catch Fire (M-Net Edge)
- 16 December - (United States) The Muppets (M-Net)
- 17 December - (United Kingdom) The Last Kingdom (M-Net Edge)
- 19 December - (United States) Long Live the Royals (Cartoon Network)
- (Canada) Dr. Dimensionpants (e.tv)
- (United Kingdom) / (Canada) Kate & Mim-Mim (eToonz)
- (Canada) / (United States) Shimmer and Shine (Nick Jr.)

=== Changes of network affiliation ===
Shows	Moved from	Moved to
(United States) Tamar & Vince	Vuzu	Vuzu Amp
(United States) The Originals	Vuzu	Vuzu Amp
(United States) American Idol	M-Net Series Reality	Vuzu Amp
(United States) The Real Housewives of Beverly Hills	M-Net Series Reality	Vuzu Amp
(United States) Veep	M-Net Series Showcase	Vuzu Amp
(United States) Hart of Dixie	M-Net Series Showcase	Vuzu Amp
(United States) The 100	M-Net Series Showcase	Vuzu Amp
(United States) The Fosters	M-Net Series Showcase	Vuzu Amp
(United States) The Vampire Diaries	M-Net Series Showcase	Vuzu Amp
(United States) Agents of S.H.I.E.L.D.	M-Net Series Zone	Vuzu Amp
(United Kingdom) Broadchurch	M-Net Series Zone	M-Net Edge
(United States) The Following	M-Net Series Zone	M-Net Edge
(United States) Covert Affairs	M-Net Series Zone	M-Net Edge
(United States) Unforgettable	M-Net Series Zone	M-Net Edge
(Canada) / (United States) Reign	M-Net Series Zone	M-Net Edge
(United States) The Mentalist	M-Net Series Zone	M-Net Edge
(United States) Homeland	M-Net Series Zone	M-Net Edge
(United States) The Blacklist	M-Net Series Zone	M-Net Edge
(United States) Brotherhood	SABC3	M-Net Edge
(United States) Banshee	Mzansi Magic	M-Net Edge
(United States) The Wire	Mzansi Magic	M-Net Edge
(United States) Grimm	M-Net Series Showcase	M-Net Edge
(United States) Rizzoli & Isles	M-Net Series Showcase	M-Net Edge
(Canada) / (Republic of Ireland) Vikings	M-Net Series Showcase	M-Net Edge
(United States) Shameless	M-Net Series Showcase	M-Net Edge
(United States) American Horror Story	M-Net Series Showcase	M-Net Edge
(United States) Girls	M-Net Series Showcase	M-Net Edge
(United States) Bates Motel	M-Net Series Showcase	M-Net Edge
(United States) Gotham	M-Net	M-Net Edge
(United States) CSI: Cyber	M-Net	M-Net Edge
(United States) Murder in the First	M-Net	M-Net Edge
(United States) True Detective	M-Net	M-Net Edge
(United States) Fargo	M-Net	M-Net Edge
(United States) 24: Live Another Day	M-Net	M-Net Edge
(United States) The Mysteries of Laura	M-Net	M-Net Edge
(United States) House of Cards	M-Net	M-Net Edge
(United States) Body of Proof	M-Net	Sony Channel
(United States) Bad Teacher	M-Net	Vuzu
(United States) The Last Ship	M-Net	M-Net City
(United States) About a Boy	M-Net	M-Net City
(United States) Extant	M-Net	M-Net City
(United States) Perception	M-Net Series	M-Net City
(United States) A to Z	Vuzu Amp	M-Net City
(United States) Satisfaction (USA)	M-Net Edge	M-Net City
(United States) Stalker	M-Net Edge	M-Net City
(United States) The Sopranos	M-Net Edge	Mzansi Magic
(United States) Lip Sync Battle	MTV Africa	e.tv
(United States) / (Japan) Transformers: Animated	SABC2	SABC1
(United States) / (Republic of Ireland) Doc McStuffins	SABC2	Disney Junior
(United States) Bubble Guppies	SABC2	Nick Jr.
(Canada) Dr. Dimensionpants	e.tv	eToonz
(United States) All of Us	Vuzu	SABC2
(United States) Young & Hungry	Vuzu	M-Net Series Zone
(United Kingdom) Britain's Got Talent	Vuzu	M-Net Series Zone
(United States) Graceland	M-Net Edge	M-Net Series Zone
(United States) Resurrection	M-Net	M-Net Series Zone
(United States) Almost Human	M-Net	M-Net Series Zone
(United Kingdom) The X Factor (UK)	M-Net	M-Net Series Zone
(United States) Intelligence	M-Net	M-Net Series Zone
(United States) Us & Them	M-Net	M-Net Series Zone
(United States) The Night Shift	M-Net	M-Net Series Zone
(United States) Agent Carter	M-Net	M-Net Family
(United States) The Odd Couple (2015)	M-Net	M-Net Family
(Canada) Motive	M-Net	SABC2
(United States) The Jamie Foxx Show	SABC3	SABC2
(United States) Pretty Little Liars	Vuzu Amp	SABC2
(United States) For Better or Worse	Vuzu Amp	Mzansi Magic
(United States) Selfie	Vuzu Amp	Vuzu
(United States) Undateable	Vuzu Amp	Vuzu
(United States) Galavant	Vuzu Amp	Vuzu
(United States) The Sing-Off (USA)	M-Net Series Reality	M-Net Series Zone

== Television shows ==
=== 1980s ===
- Good Morning South Africa (1985-present)
- Carte Blanche (1988–present)

=== 1990s ===
- Top Billing (1992–present)
- Generations (1994–present)
- Isidingo (1998–present)

=== 2000s ===
- Idols South Africa (2002–present)
- Rhythm City (2007–present)
- SA's Got Talent (2009–present)

== Ending this year ==
- Strictly Come Dancing (2006-2008, 2013–2015)
- Takalani Sesame (2000-2015)

== New channels ==
- 3 February: Zee World
- 11 May: SABC Encore
- 1 September: BBC Brit

== See also ==
- 2015 in South Africa
