= 2013 in South African television =

This is a list of South African television related events from 2012.

== Events ==
- 11 September - The Wild actress Zakeeya Patel and her partner Ryan Hammond win the sixth season of Strictly Come Dancing.
- 17 October - 16-year-old singer Johnny Apple wins the fourth season of SA's Got Talent.
- 26 November - Musa Sekwene wins the ninth season of Idols South Africa.

== Debuts ==
=== Domestic ===
- 2 March - Isibaya (Mzansi Magic) (2013–present)
- 10 April - Million Rand Money Drop (2013)
- 10 July - Strictly Come Dancing (SABC2) (2006-2008, 2013–2015)

=== International ===
- 4 January - (United States) The Secret Circle (M-Net Series)
- 5 January - (United States) Let's Stay Together (e.tv)
- 11 January - (United States) Animal Practice (M-Net)
- 14 January - (United States) Unforgettable (M-Net Series)
- 15 January - (United States) The Mindy Project (M-Net Series)
- 16 January - (United States) Elementary (M-Net)
- 30 January - (United States) The Following (M-Net)
- 31 January - (United States) Wedding Band (M-Net Series)
- 1 February - (United States) Last Man Standing (M-Net)
- 4 February - (France) Jo (Fox Entertainment)
- 5 February - (United States) Bette (e.tv)
- 7 February - (United States) The Americans (M-Net)
- 9 February - (United States) Crash & Bernstein (Disney XD)
- 9 February - (United States) Baby Daddy (M-Net Series)
- 4 March - (Canada) Saving Hope (Sony Channel)
- 4 March - (Germany) / (Canada) / (France) Transporter: The Series (Fox Entertainment)
- 5 March - (United States) The Client List (SABC3)
- 14 March - (United States) Mr. Box Office (SABC1)
- 21 March - (United States) Zero Hour (2013) (M-Net Series)
- 30 March - (United States) / (Canada) Beauty and the Beast (2012) (M-Net)
- 3 April - (United States) Go On (M-Net)
- 5 April - (United States) 666 Park Avenue (M-Net Series)
- 6 April - (Republic of Ireland) / (United States) / (United Kingdom) Randy Cunningham: 9th Grade Ninja (Disney XD)
- 17 April - (United States) Deception (2013) (M-Net Series)
- 18 April - (United States) Suburgatory (Vuzu)
- 20 April - (United States) The Rickey Smiley Show (M-Net Series)
- 20 April - (United States) Do No Harm (M-Net Series)
- 23 April - (United States) Hannibal (Sony Channel)
- 24 April - (United States) Emily Owens, M.D. (M-Net Series)
- 29 April - (United States) Longmire (M-Net Series)
- 1 May - (United Kingdom) Hunted (M-Net Series)
- 6 May - (United Kingdom) / (United States) Da Vinci's Demons (Fox)
- 13 May - (United States) Golden Boy (M-Net Series)
- 14 May - (United States) Vegas (2012) (M-Net)
- 14 May - (United States) Made in Jersey (SABC3)
- 22 May - (United Kingdom) World's Toughest Trucker (SABC3)
- 22 May - (United States) Project Runway All Stars (Vuzu)
- 27 May - (United States) Political Animals (M-Net)
- 31 May - (United States) Red Widow (M-Net)
- 1 June - (United States) Family Tools (M-Net Series)
- 9 June - (United States) Take It All (M-Net)
- 21 June - (United States) Bates Motel (M-Net)
- 23 June - The Amazing Race Australia (Sony Channel)
- 10 July - (United States) The Carrie Diaries (M-Net Series Showcase)
- 12 July - (United States) The Face (M-Net Series Reality)
- 12 July - (United States) Grimm (M-Net Series Showcase)
- 14 July - (United States) 1600 Penn (M-Net Series Showcase)
- 15 July - (United States) Against the Wall (M-Net Series Zone)
- 15 July - (United States) Defiance (M-Net Series Showcase)
- 15 July - (Canada) / (United Kingdom) Primeval: New World (M-Net Series Showcase)
- 20 July - (Canada) Motive (M-Net)
- 28 July - (United States) Veep (M-Net Series Showcase)
- 3 August - (United States) / (United Kingdom) / (Republic of Ireland) / (Canada) Henry Hugglemonster (Disney Junior)
- 6 August - (United States) Ray Donovan (M-Net)
- 8 August - (United Kingdom) / (Germany) / (Canada) World Without End (M-Net Movies Premiere)
- 4 September - (United States) Guys with Kids (M-Net)
- 11 September - (United States) The Fosters (M-Net Series Showcase)
- 18 September - (United States) King & Maxwell (M-Net)
- 7 October - (United States) Tamar & Vince (Vuzu)
- 9 October - (United States) Camp (M-Net Series Showcase)
- 10 October - (Australia) / (New Zealand) / (United Kingdom) Top of the Lake (M-Net Movies Premiere)
- 11 October - (United States) Ironside (2013) (M-Net)
- 14 October - (United States) Twisted (M-Net Series Showcase)
- 14 October - (United States) Nashville (M-Net)
- 14 October - (United States) Sleepy Hollow (M-Net Series Showcase)
- 15 October - (United States) Avengers Assemble (Disney XD)
- 16 October - (United Kingdom) / (United States) Family Tree (M-Net)
- 16 October - (United States) Banshee (M-Net)
- 18 October - (United States) Mom (M-Net)
- 22 October - (Germany) / (France) / (United States) / (Italy) Crossing Lines (Sony Channel)
- 25 October - (United States) Zach Stone Is Gonna Be Famous (MTV Africa)
- 25 October - (United States) The Tomorrow People (2013) (M-Net)
- 29 October - (United States) Sean Saves the World (M-Net Series Showcase)
- 7 November - (United Kingdom) The Hollow Crown (M-Net Movies Premiere)
- 7 November - (United States) The Crazy Ones (M-Net)
- 8 November - (United States) House of Cards (M-Net)
- 27 November - (United States) The Millers (M-Net)
- 2 December - (United States) Brooklyn Nine-Nine (Vuzu)
- 4 December - (United States) Agents of S.H.I.E.L.D. (M-Net)
- (Canada) Camp Lakebottom (Disney XD)
- (Germany) / (India) / (France) The Jungle Book (2010) (e.tv)
- (United Kingdom) / (France) Dude, That's My Ghost! (Disney XD)
- (Republic of Ireland) / (United Kingdom) Tilly and Friends (CBeebies)

=== Changes of network affiliation ===
Shows	Moved from	Moved to
(United States) Numb3rs	SABC3	SABC2
(United States) The Good Wife	SABC3	M-Net Series Zone
(United States) Longmire	M-Net Series	M-Net Series Showcase
(United States) Criminal Minds	M-Net Series	M-Net Series Showcase
(United States) Army Wives	M-Net Series	M-Net Series Showcase
(United States) The Killing	M-Net Series	M-Net Series Showcase
(United States) Shameless	M-Net Series	M-Net Series Showcase
(United States) Major Crimes	M-Net Series	M-Net Series Showcase
(United States) Family Tools	M-Net Series	M-Net Series Showcase
(United States) The Mindy Project	M-Net Series	M-Net Series Showcase
(United States) Covert Affairs	M-Net Series	M-Net Series Showcase
(United States) Switched at Birth	M-Net Series	M-Net Series Showcase
(United States) Glee	M-Net Series	M-Net Series Showcase
(United States) Medium	M-Net Series	M-Net Series Showcase
(United States) The Lying Game	M-Net Series	M-Net Series Showcase
(United States) Pretty Little Liars	M-Net Series	M-Net Series Showcase
(United States) Breaking Bad	M-Net Series	M-Net Series Showcase
(United States) Smash	M-Net Series	M-Net Series Showcase
(United States) Once Upon a Time	M-Net Series	M-Net Series Showcase
(United States) Mad Men	M-Net Series	M-Net Series Showcase
(United States) Person of Interest	M-Net Series	M-Net Series Showcase
(United States) Teen Wolf	Vuzu	M-Net Series Showcase
(United States) The Office (USA)	Vuzu	M-Net Series Showcase
(United States) Sister, Sister	Vuzu	Sony Channel
(Canada) Rookie Blue	SABC1	SABC3
(United States) Human Target	SABC1	SABC3
(United States) The Cleaner	SABC1	SABC3
(United States) Barney and Friends	JimJam	SABC3
(United States) Suits	M-Net	M-Net Series
(United States) Perception	M-Net	M-Net Series
(United States) The Newsroom	M-Net	M-Net Series
(Canada) / (Australia) / (United Kingdom) Pixel Pinkie	M-Net	eToonz
(United States) The Following	M-Net	M-Net Series Zone
(United States) Blue Bloods	M-Net	M-Net Series Zone
(United States) Revenge	M-Net	M-Net Series Zone
(United States) The Fixer (2012)	M-Net	M-Net Series Zone
(United States) / (Canada) Beauty and the Beast (2012)	M-Net	M-Net Series Zone
(United States) Dallas (2012)	M-Net	M-Net Series Zone
(United States) The Americans	M-Net	M-Net Series Zone
(United States) Hart of Dixie	M-Net Series	M-Net Series Zone
(United States) Necessary Roughness	M-Net Series	M-Net Series Zone
(United States) Game of Thrones	M-Net Series	M-Net Series Zone
(United States) Warehouse 13	M-Net Series	M-Net Series Zone
(United States) Golden Boy	M-Net Series	M-Net Series Zone
(United States) Unforgettable	M-Net Series	M-Net Series Zone
(United States) The Rickey Smiley Show	M-Net Series	M-Net Series Zone
(United States) Homeland	M-Net Series	M-Net Series Zone
(United States) Boss	M-Net Series	M-Net Series Zone
(United States) The Glades	M-Net Series	M-Net Series Zone
(Canada) / (France) XIII: The Series	M-Net Series	M-Net Series Zone
(Canada) Sanctuary	M-Net Series	M-Net Series Zone
(United States) Breakout Kings	M-Net Series	M-Net Series Zone
(United States) The Parkers	M-Net Series	Vuzu
(United States) New Girl	M-Net Series	Vuzu
(United States) The Face	M-Net Series Reality	Vuzu
(United Kingdom) Chuggington Badge Quest	SABC2	SABC1
(United Kingdom) Chuggington	SABC2	SABC1
(France) Jo	Fox Entertainment	Fox
(Canada) The Listener	Fox Entertainment	Fox
(United States) Falling Skies	Fox Entertainment	Fox
(Canada) Republic of Doyle	Fox Entertainment	Fox
(Canada) / (Republic of Ireland) Camelot	Fox Entertainment	Fox
(United States) Grey's Anatomy	Fox Entertainment	Fox
(Germany) / (Canada) / (France) Transporter: The Series	Fox Entertainment	Fox
(United States) Castle	Fox Entertainment	M-Net Series Showcase
(United States) Nurse Jackie	SABC3	M-Net Series Showcase
(United Kingdom) Thomas and Friends	e.tv	eToonz
(China) Abu the Little Dinosaur	e.tv	eToonz
(Australia) Bananas in Pyjamas (CGI)	e.tv	eToonz
(United States) / (Canada) The Little Lulu Show	e.tv	eToonz
(United Kingdom) Peppa Pig	e.tv	eToonz
(Japan) Astro Boy	e.tv	eToonz
(Australia) The New Adventures of Ocean Girl	e.tv	eToonz
(France) / (Italy) Gormiti (2008)	e.tv	eToonz
Cool Catz	e.tv	eToonz
(United Kingdom) Bob the Builder: Ready, Steady, Build!	e.tv	eToonz
(China) AI Football GGO	e.tv	eToonz
(Iceland) LazyTown	e.tv	eToonz
(United States) Dora the Explorer	e.tv	eToonz
(United States) The Biggest Loser (USA)	e.tv	M-Net Series Reality
(United States) The Real Housewives of Orange County	Vuzu	M-Net Series Reality

== Television shows ==
=== 1980s ===
- Good Morning South Africa (1985–present)
- Carte Blanche (1988–present)

=== 1990s ===
- Top Billing (1992–present)
- Generations (1994–present)
- Isidingo (1998–present)

=== 2000s ===
- Idols South Africa (2002–present)
- Rhythm City (2007–present)
- SA's Got Talent (2009–present)

== New channels ==
- 3 July - MTV
- 20 August - ANN7
- 15 October - eKasi+
- 16 October - eMovies
- 16 October - eToonz
- 5 November - Spice TV

== Defunct channels ==
- Unknown - MK

== See also ==
- 2013 in South Africa
