= 2017 in South African television =

This is a list of South African television-related events in 2017.

== Events ==
- 9 July - Craig Lucas wins the second season of The Voice South Africa.
- 12 November - A cappella group AnecNote win the eighth season of SA's Got Talent.
- 2 December - The CBeebies children’s game show Kerwhizz starts premiering on M-Net for the first time in HD, which started airing on Saturdays at 6AM from December 2, 2017 until March 24, 2018, along with Big & Small and Maya the Bee, which both starts at 7AM and 7:30 AM.

== Debuts ==
=== International ===
- 13 March - (Canada) Rusty Rivets (Nick Jr.)
- 5 June - (United States) Bunsen is a Beast (Nicktoons)
- 26 June - (United States) Nella the Princess Knight (Nick Jr.)
- 22 August - (United States) Chicago Justice (M-Net)
- 28 October - (United States) Vampirina (Disney Junior)
- 4 December - (Canada) / (United States) Welcome to the Wayne (Nickelodeon)

=== Changes of network affiliation ===
Shows	Moved from	Moved to
(United States) House	M-Net Series Zone	eExtra
(United States) The Bernie Mac Show	Sony Channel	eExtra
(United States) The Carmichael Show	Vuzu	eExtra
(United States) The League	Vuzu	M-Net City
(United States) Chicago Justice	M-Net	M-Net City
(United States) Bob's Burgers	M-Net Family	M-Net City
(United States) Royal Pains	M-Net Family	M-Net City
(United States) Unforgettable	M-Net Family	eExtra
(United States) Modern Family	M-Net Family	eExtra
(United States) Sleeper Cell	Mzansi Magic	M-Net Edge
(Canada) What About Mimi?	SABC1	eToonz
(United States) / (Canada) PAW Patrol	e.tv	eToonz
(United States) Billions	M-Net City	M-Net
(Canada) / (United States) Reign	M-Net City	M-Net
(United States) Mozart in the Jungle	M-Net City	M-Net
(United States) NCIS	Sony Channel	M-Net
(United States) Silicon Valley	M-Net Edge	M-Net
(United Kingdom) Broadchurch	M-Net Edge	M-Net
(United States) Lucifer	M-Net Edge	M-Net
(United States) Grimm	M-Net Edge	M-Net
(United States) Fargo	M-Net Edge	M-Net City
(United States) Aquarius	M-Net Edge	M-Net City
(United States) The Leftovers	M-Net Edge	M-Net City
(United States) Angie Tribeca	M-Net Edge	Vuzu
(Canada) Killjoys	M-Net Edge	Vuzu
(United States) Stitchers	M-Net Family	Vuzu
(United States) / (Canada) My Little Pony: Friendship is Magic	Nicktoons	e.tv
(United States) Little Big Shots	M-Net	e.tv
(United States) Days of Our Lives	SABC3	e.tv
(United States) Brooklyn Nine-Nine	SABC3	M-Net Family
(United States) Supergirl	Vuzu	M-Net Family
(United States) Legends of Tomorrow	Vuzu	M-Net Family
(United States) The Mysteries of Laura	M-Net City	M-Net Family
(United States) / (France) Dennis the Menace	eToonz	SABC3
(United States) / (Republic of Ireland) Doc McStuffins	Disney Junior	SABC2

== Television shows ==
=== 1980s ===
- Good Morning South Africa (1985–present)
- Carte Blanche (1988–present)

=== 1990s ===
- Top Billing (1992–present)
- Generations (1994–present)
- Isidingo (1998–present)

=== 2000s ===
- Idols South Africa (2002–present)
- Rhythm City (2007–present)
- SA's Got Talent (2009–present)

=== 2010s ===
- The Voice South Africa (2016–present)

== Defunct channels ==
- 1 April - M-Net Edge

== Rebranding channels ==
- Unknown - eKasi+ to eExtra

== See also ==
- 2017 in South Africa
