= 2014 in South African television =

This is a list of South African television-related events in 2014.

== Events ==
- 6 April – Mandla Hlatshwayo wins season 3 of Big Brother.
- 18 August – SABC sacks the 16 cast members of its soap, Generations after the actors went on strike following a long-running dispute over their employment contracts.
- 6 September – Launch of the South African version of The X Factor.
- 20 September – The Top Billing presenter Jonathan Boynton-Lee and his partner Hayley Bennett-Fraiden win the seventh season of Strictly Come Dancing.
- 9 November – 14-year-old singer and guitarist Tholwana Mohale wins the fifth season of SA's Got Talent.
- 23 November – Vincent Bones wins the tenth season of Idols South Africa.
- 13 December – Four win the first season of The X Factor South Africa.

== Debuts ==
=== Domestic ===
- 2 February - Big Brother (M-Net) (2001-2002, 2014–present)
- 6 September - The X Factor South Africa (SABC 1) (2014–present)

=== International ===
- 1 January - (United States) The Originals (M-Net Series Showcase)
- 5 January - (United Kingdom) Broadchurch (M-Net Series Showcase)
- 23 January - (United States) Devious Maids (M-Net Series Showcase)
- 3 February - (United States) Sanjay and Craig (Nickelodeon)
- 2 March - (Australia) Wentworth (M-Net Series Showcase)
- 5 May - (United States) The Goldbergs (M-Net)
- 16 May - (United States) Playing House (M-Net Series Showcase)
- 4 June - (United States) The 100 (M-Net Series Showcase)
- 12 June - (United States) Rake (M-Net Series Showcase)
- 9 September - (Australia) Old School (M-Net Series Showcase)
- 28 September - (United States) Full Circle (M-Net Series Showcase)
- 24 October - (United States) Silicon Valley (M-Net Edge)
- 18 November - (Australia) Jonah from Tonga (Vuzu)
- (Wales) Fireman Sam (CGI) (e.tv)
- (United Kingdom) Angelina Ballerina: The Next Steps (e.tv)
- (United Kingdom) Dinopaws (CBeebies)
- (United States) Wander Over Yonder (Disney XD)
- (United States) / (Canada) PAW Patrol (Nickelodeon)
- (Spain) Koki (eToonz)

=== Changes of network affiliation ===
Shows	Moved from	Moved to
(United States) Hawthorne	M-Net Series	e.tv
(United States) Missing (2012)	M-Net Series	SABC3
(United States) Common Law (2012)	M-Net Series	SABC3
(United States) The Carrier Diaries	M-Net Series Showcase	Vuzu
(United States) Rake	M-Net Series Showcase	M-Net Series Zone
(United Kingdom) Broadchurch	M-Net Series Showcase	M-Net Series Zone
(United States) Devious Maids	M-Net Series Showcase	M-Net Series Zone
(United States) Nashville	M-Net	M-Net Series Zone
(United States) Defiance	M-Net Series Zone	M-Net Edge

== Television shows ==
=== 1980s ===
- Good Morning South Africa (1985–present)
- Carte Blanche (1988–present)

=== 1990s ===
- Top Billing (1992–present)
- Generations (1994–present)
- Isidingo (1998–present)

=== 2000s ===
- Idols South Africa (2002–present)
- Strictly Come Dancing (2006-2008, 2013–2015)
- Rhythm City (2007–present)
- SA's Got Talent (2009–present)

=== New channels ===
- 1 May - Romanza+ África
- 30 September - Nicktoons
- 30 September - Nick Jr.
- 20 October - M-Net Edge

== See also ==
- 2014 in South Africa
