= 2010 in South African television =

This is a list of South African television related events from 2010.

== Events ==
- 28 October - 45-year-old opera singer James Bhemgee wins the second season of SA's Got Talent.
- 2 November - Elvis Blue wins the sixth season of Idols South Africa.

== Debuts ==
=== International ===
- 2 January - (United Kingdom) Merlin (M-Net)
- 14 January - (United States) Life on Mars (USA) (M-Net Action)
- 15 January - (United States) Bored to Death (Vuzu))
- 16 January - (United States) Valentine (M-Net Series)
- 19 January - (United States) FlashForward (M-Net)
- 20 January - (United States) / (Canada) Stargate Universe (M-Net Action)
- 22 January - (United States) Date My Ex: Jo & Slade (M-Net Series)
- 25 January - (United States) The Good Wife (M-Net)
- 1 February - (United States) The Vampire Diaries (Vuzu)
- 8 February - (United States) Dollhouse (M-Net Action)
- 12 February - (Australia) Underbelly (M-Net Action)
- 1 March - (United States) Kings (M-Net Series)
- 4 March - (United States) Blue Mountain State (Vuzu)
- 5 March - (United States) Wipeout (M-Net)
- 10 March - (United States) The Starter Wife (2008) (SABC3)
- 11 March - (United States) The Forgotten (M-Net Action)
- 13 March - (United States) Eastbound & Down (Vuzu)
- 17 March - (United States) The Middle (M-Net)
- 28 March - (United States) The Company (SABC3)
- 5 April - (United Kingdom) Law & Order: UK (Sony Channel)
- 7 April - (United States) Community (Vuzu)
- 14 April - (United States) White Collar (M-Net Series)
- 17 April - (United States) Mad TV (SABC2)
- 2 May - (United States) V.I.P. (e.tv)
- 13 May - (United States) Southland (M-Net Action)
- 24 May - (United States) Happy Town (M-Net Series)
- 24 May - (United States) Toughest Cowboy (M-Net Action)
- 1 June - (United States) As the World Turns (SABC2)
- 4 June - (United States) Family Guy (Fox Entertainment)
- 8 June - (United States) Nurse Jackie (M-Net)
- 14 June - (United States) / (Canada) Martha Speaks (M-Net)
- 15 June - (United States) Caprica (M-Net Action)
- 16 June - (United States) Easy Money (M-Net Series)
- 23 June - (United Kingdom) Material Girl (SABC3)
- 30 June - (United States) NCIS: Los Angeles (M-Net)
- 1 July - (United States) Hank (M-Net Series)
- 4 July - (United States) The League (Vuzu)
- 27 July - (United States) Drop Dead Diva (M-Net)
- 1 August - (Canada) Republic of Doyle (Fox Entertainment)
- 4 August - (United States) Cougar Town (M-Net)
- 11 August - (United States) Eastwick (M-Net Series)
- 16 August - (United States) True Beauty (Vuzu)
- 17 August - (United Kingdom) / (United States) / (Canada) / (Germany) Defying Gravity (M-Net Action)
- 23 August - (United States) Men of a Certain Age (M-Net Series)
- 30 August - (United States) Parenthood (2010) (M-Net Series)
- 1 September - (United States) Modern Family (M-Net)
- 16 September - (United States) Melrose Place (2009) (M-Net)
- 29 September - (United States) The Event (M-Net)
- 29 September - (United States) Accidentally on Purpose (Vuzu)
- 29 September - (United Kingdom) Collision (M-Net Series)
- 7 October - (United States) Persons Unknown (M-Net Action)
- 12 October - (United States) The Real Housewives of New Jersey (M-Net Series)
- 18 October - (United States) Top 20 Most Shocking (Fox Entertainment)
- 18 October - The Contender Australia (M-Net Action)
- 22 October - (United States) Human Target (M-Net)
- 3 November - (United States) The Gates (M-Net Series)
- 10 November - (United States) Scoundrels (M-Net Series)
- 11 November - (United States) The Rachel Zoe Project (Vuzu)
- 14 November - (United States) Kirstie Alley's Big Life (M-Net)
- 17 November - (United States) Pretty Little Liars (Vuzu)
- 29 November - (United States) The Cleveland Show (Vuzu)
- 29 November - (United States) No Ordinary Family (Vuzu)
- 29 November - (United States) Trauma (SABC3)
- 10 December - (United States) Romantically Challenged (Vuzu)
- 13 December - (United States) Three Rivers (M-Net Series)
- 22 December - (United States) Boardwalk Empire (M-Net)
- 22 Daughter - (United States) Sons & Daughters (SABC3)
- 30 December - (United Kingdom) Cheryl Cole's Night In (M-Net)
- (Norway) City of Friends (M-Net)
- (United Kingdom) / (Republic of Ireland) The Octonauts (M-Net)
- (Canada) Animal Mechanicals (M-Net)
- (United Kingdom) Everything's Rosie (CBeebies)
- (United States) Pink Panther and Pals (Boomerang)
- (Canada) Jimmy Two-Shoes (SABC3)
- (France) / (United Kingdom) / (United States) Gaspard and Lisa (M-Net)
- (Russia) GoGoRiki (M-Net)
- (Canada) Babar and the Adventures of Badou (M-Net)
- (United States) The Land Before Time (SABC3)
- (Canada) / (United States) Get Ed (SABC3)
- (United States) / (Canada) Hot Wheels Battle Force 5 (M-Net)
- (Singapore) / (Canada) / (Hong Kong) Clang Invasion (M-Net)
- (France) I.N.K. Invisible Network of Kids (M-Net)
- (Germany) / (Australia) Tabaluga (Top Junior)
- (Canada) Spliced (M-Net)
- (Canada) Sidekick (M-Net)
- (South Korea) / (Canada) MetaJets (M-Net)

=== Changes of network affiliation ===
Shows	Moved from	Moved to
(United States) Buck Rogers in the 25th Century	Sci-Fi Channel	Fox Retro
(United Kingdom) Space 1999	TV1	Fox Retro
(United States) The Game	SABC3	SABC1
(United States) The Apprentice (USA)	SABC3	M-Net Series
(United States) Ally McBeal	SABC3	Fox Entertainment
(United States) Dark Angel	SABC3	Fox Entertainment
(United States) Criminal Minds	M-Net Action	Fox Entertainment
(United States) Grey's Anatomy	M-Net Series	Fox Entertainment
(United States) Boston Legal	M-Net Series	Fox Entertainment
(United States) Tru Calling	M-Net	Fox Entertainment
(United States) Futurama	M-Net	Vuzu
(United States) Legend of the Seeker	M-Net	Vuzu
(United States) Parks and Recreation	M-Net	Vuzu
(United States) Modern Family	M-Net	Vuzu
(United States) Half & Half	SABC1	Vuzu
(United States) / (Italy) Sonic the Hedgehog	SABC1	KidsCo
(United States) Sabrina: The Animated Series	SABC1	KidsCo
(United States) The New Adventures of Madeline	SABC1	KidsCo
(United Kingdom) Paddington	e.tv	KidsCo
(United States) / (France) / (Canada) Inspector Gadget	e.tv	KidsCo
(United States) / (France) Dennis the Menace	e.tv	KidsCo
(United Kingdom) Horrid Henry	K-T.V. World	M-Net
(United Kingdom) Rubbadubbers	K-T.V. World	JimJam
(United Kingdom) Angelina Ballerina	K-T.V. World	JimJam
(United States) Barney and Friends	K-T.V. World	JimJam
(United Kingdom) Bob the Builder (1999)	K-T.V. World	JimJam
(United Kingdom) Thomas and Friends	K-T.V. World	JimJam
(United Kingdom) / (United States) Tiny Planets	K-T.V. World	JimJam
(United Kingdom) Kipper	K-T.V. World	JimJam
(Wales) Fireman Sam (1987)	K-T.V. World	JimJam
(United States) / (Canada) The Little Lulu Show	K-T.V. World	e.tv
(Australia) The New Adventures of Ocean Girl	K-T.V. World	e.tv
(United States) My Boys	Vuzu	e.tv
(Canada) / (France) Mona the Vampire	SABC2	e.tv
(United States) 7th Heaven	SABC2	Vuzu
(Belgium) / (Canada) Ovide Video	TV1	SABC2
(United States) Ghost Whisperer	M-Net Action	SABC2
(United States) Life	M-Net Series	SABC2
(United States) Everybody Hates Chris	SABC1	SABC3
(United States) Ugly Betty	Go	SABC3
Pumpkin Patch	Africa2Africa	SABC3
(United States) Wizards of Waverly Place	Disney Channel	SABC3

== Television shows ==
=== 1980s ===
- Good Morning South Africa (1985–present)
- Carte Blanche (1988–present)

=== 1990s ===
- Top Billing (1992–present)
- Generations (1994–present)
- Isidingo (1998–present)

=== 2000s ===
- Idols South Africa (2002–present)
- Rhythm City (2007–present)
- SA's Got Talent (2009–present)

== Ending this year ==
- Egoli: Place of Gold (1992-2010)

== New channels ==
- 1 May - Fox Entertainment (until 2013 then simply named "Fox")
- 12 July - Mzansi Magic

== See also ==
- 2010 in South Africa
