= 2006 in South African television =

This is a list of South African television related events from 2006.

== Events ==
- 25 March - Radio DJ Zuraida Jardine and her partner Michael Wentink win the first season of Strictly Come Dancing.
- 28 May - The Afrikaans version of Idols South Africa debuts on KykNet.
- 28 August - Dewald Louw wins the first season of the Afrikaans version of Idols.
- 23 September - Television handyman Riaan Venter and his partner Hayley Hammond win the second season of Strictly Come Dancing.

== Debuts ==
=== Domestic ===
- 4 February - Strictly Come Dancing (2006-2008, 2013–2015)
- Cool Catz (e.tv) (2006–present)

=== International ===
- 17 January - (United States) Prison Break (M-Net)
- 24 January - (United States) Weeds (M-Net)
- 3 March - (United States) Project Runway (M-Net Series)
- 13 March - (United Kingdom) Hustle (SABC3)
- 24 March - (United States) Beauty and the Geek (M-Net Series)
- 3 April - (United States) Boston Legal (M-Net Series)
- 10 April - (United States) Grey's Anatomy (M-Net)
- 27 April - (United States) Barbershop (SABC1)
- 27 April - (United States) Last Comic Standing (M-Net Series)
- 23 May - (United Kingdom) 2DTV (M-Net)
- 11 June - (United Kingdom) Tribe (BBC Prime)
- 13 June - (United States) Medical Investigation (SABC2)
- 21 June - (United States) Ghost Whisperer (Go)
- 28 June - (United States) The War at Home (M-Net)
- 28 June - (United States) My Name Is Earl (M-Net)
- 29 June - (United States) Bones (SABC3)
- 2 July - (United Kingdom) Planet Earth (SABC3)
- 14 July - (United States) Everybody Hates Chris (SABC1)
- 31 July - (United Kingdom) Afterlife (BBC Prime)
- 1 August - (United States) The Tyra Banks Show (SABC3)
- 11 August - (United States) Invasion (M-Net)
- 14 August - (United States) The New Adventures of Old Christine (SABC3)
- 20 August - (United Kingdom) / (United States) / (Italy) Rome (M-Net)
- 11 September - (United States) The Biggest Loser (USA) (e.tv)
- 17 September - (United States) How I Met Your Mother (e.tv)
- 29 September - (United States) Hannah Montana (Disney Channel)
- 2 October - (United States) Into the West (M-Net)
- 2 October - (Canada) Blue Murder (SABC1)
- 5 October - (United States) So You Think You Can Dance (M-Net Series)
- 23 October - (United States) 10.5 (e.tv)
- 24 October - (United States) In Justice (M-Net)
- 12 November - (United States) Big Love (M-Net)
- 21 November - (United States) The Office (USA) (M-Net)
- 9 December - (United States) / (United Kingdom) Tsunami: The Aftermath (M-Net)
- 14 December - (United States) Brotherhood (M-Net)
- (Canada) / (United States) Alien Racers (SABC3)
- (Canada) Naturally, Sadie (M-Net)
- (United States) The Buzz on Maggie (e.tv)
- (United States) The Replacements (e.tv)
- (United Kingdom) Gordon the Garden Gnome (M-Net)
- (France) / (Republic of Ireland) / (United States) Four Eyes! (SABC3)
- (Canada) Di-Gata Defenders (M-Net)
- (United States) Kappa Mikey (M-Net)
- (United States) Maya & Miguel (SABC3)
- (Canada) Class of the Titans (M-Net)
- (United States) Trollz (SABC1)
- (Japan) Battle B-Daman (SABC2)
- (Canada) Miss Spider's Sunny Patch Friends (SABC3)
- (Canada) / (United Kingdom) Harry and His Bucket Full of Dinosaurs (SABC3)
- (United Kingdom) Tractor Tom (SABC3)

=== Changes of network affiliation ===
Shows	Moved from	Moved to
(United Kingdom) Spooks	SABC3	BBC Prime
(Canada) What About Mimi?	K-T.V. World	SABC1
(Canada) Katie and Orbie	SABC2	M-Net
(France) / (Canada) Fly Tales	SABC2	e.tv
(United States) House	M-Net	M-Net Series
(United States) Grey's Anatomy	M-Net	M-Net Series
(United States) The War at Home	M-Net	M-Net Series
(United States) The Bachelor	M-Net	M-Net Series
(United States) Angel	M-Net	M-Net Series
(United States) / (Canada) The L Word	M-Net	M-Net Series
(United States) Prison Break	M-Net	M-Net Series
(United States) The Guardian	M-Net	SABC2
(United States) Eve	M-Net	SABC1
(United States) Jay Jay the Jet Plane	M-Net	SABC3
(United Kingdom) Legend of the Dragon	M-Net	SABC3
(France) Tom and Sheenah	SABC2	SABC3
(United States) The O.C.	Go	SABC3
(United States) The Jamie Foxx Show	SABC1	SABC3
(United States) Days of Our Lives	SABC1	SABC3
(United States) Goof Troop	SABC1	Disney Channel
(United States) Disney's House of Mouse	SABC1	Disney Channel
(United States) Kim Possible	SABC1	Disney Channel
(United States) The Legend of Tarzan	SABC1	Disney Channel
(United States) American Dragon	e.tv	Disney Channel
(United States) Arrested Development	e.tv	M-Net Series

== Television shows ==
=== 1980s ===
- Good Morning South Africa (1985–present)
- Carte Blanche (1988–present)

=== 1990s ===
- Top Billing (1992–present)
- Generations (1994–present)
- Isidingo (1998–present)

=== 2000s ===
- Idols South Africa (2002–present)

== See also ==
- 2006 in South Africa
