= 2011 in South African television =

This is a list of South African television related events from 2011.

== Events ==
- 12 May - Disney XD is launched for the very first time in South Africa.
- 4 October - Dave van Vuuren wins the seventh season of Idols South Africa.

== Debuts ==
=== International ===
- 5 January - (United States) The Glades (M-Net Action)
- 1 March - (United States) Justified (M-Net Series)
- 25 April - (United States) Fly Girls (Vuzu)
- 24 May - (United States) Masters of Illusion (M-Net)
- 31 May - (United States) Harry's Law (M-Net)
- 6 June - (Canada) Rookie Blue (SABC1)
- 23 June - (United States) Hawaii Five-0 (2010) (M-Net)
- (United States) Fanboy & Chum Chum (M-Net)
- 8 July - (United States) Raising Hope (M-Net)
- 1 August - (United States) Teen Wolf (Vuzu)
- 8 November - (United States) Franklin & Bash (M-Net)
- 16 December - (United States) The Lying Game (M-Net)
- 20 December - (United States) Shameless (M-Net)
- 21 December - (United States) Unnatural History (M-Net Series)
- 26 December - (Australia) Winners & Losers (M-Net Series)
- (United Kingdom) / (Republic of Ireland) The Octonauts (M-Net)
- (Canada) Scaredy Squirrel (M-Net)
- (United Kingdom) / (United States) / (Republic of Ireland) The Amazing World of Gumball (Cartoon Network)

=== Changes of network affiliation ===
Shows	Moved from	Moved to
(United States) The Bachelorette	M-Net Series	Vuzu
(United States) Sister, Sister	SABC1	Vuzu
(United Kingdom) Thomas and Friends	JimJam	e.tv
(United States) Mad About You	SABC3	e.tv
(United States) Malcolm & Eddie	Sony Channel	e.tv
(United States) Hawthorne	M-Net	M-Net Series
(United States) Harry's Law	M-Net	M-Net Series

== Television shows ==
=== 1980s ===
- Good Morning South Africa (1985–present)
- Carte Blanche (1988–present)

=== 1990s ===
- Top Billing (1992–present)
- Generations (1994–present)
- Isidingo (1998–present)

=== 2000s ===
- Idols South Africa (2002–present)
- Rhythm City (2007–present)
- SA's Got Talent (2009–present)

=== 2010s ===
- The Wild (2011–2013)

== New channels ==
- 12 May - Disney XD

== See also ==
- 2011 in South Africa
