= 2007 in South African television =

This is a list of South African television related events from 2005.

== Events ==
- 4 February - The first episode of Deal or No Deal hosted by Ed Jordan airs on M-Net.
- 12 July - Rapper Hip Hop Pantsula and his partner Hayley Bennett win the third season of Strictly Come Dancing.
- 10 December - Jody Williams wins the fourth season of Idols South Africa.

== Debuts ==
=== Domestic ===
- 4 February - Deal or No Deal (2007-2008)
- 7 February - So You Think You Can Dance (SABC1) (2007–2013)
- 9 July - Rhythm City (e.tv) (2007–present)

=== International ===
- 3 January - (United Kingdom) Silent Witness (BBC Prime)
- January - (South Africa) / (Nigeria) Jacob's Cross (M-Net)
- 1 February - (United States) Shark (M-Net)
- 4 February - (United States) Dexter (M-Net)
- 26 February - (United States) 'Til Death (SABC3)
- 1 March - (United States) Kojak (2005) (SABC1)
- 9 March - (United States) The Real Housewives of Orange County (M-Net Series)
- 15 March - (United States) Men in Trees (M-Net Series)
- 29 March - (United States) Help Me Help You (M-Net)
- 2 April - (United States) Kyle XY (Go)
- 3 April - (United Kingdom) Extras (BBC Prime)
- 3 April - (United States) Medium (SABC2)
- 6 April - (Canada) Falcon Beach (Go)
- 9 April - (United Kingdom) Jane Eyre (BBC Prime)
- 16 April - (United States) The Unit (SABC1)
- 26 April - (Canada) / (South Africa) Jozi-H (SABC3)
- 2 May - (United States) The Assistant (Go)
- 4 May - (United States) Cuts (SABC1)
- 4 May - (United States) Friday Night Lights (M-Net)
- 23 May - (United States) Heroes (SABC3)
- 25 May - (United States) The Tracy Morgan Show (SABC1)
- 5 June - (United States) 30 Rock (M-Net)
- 18 June - (United Kingdom) The Chase (BBC Prime)
- 19 June - (United Kingdom) The Mighty Boosh (BBC Prime)
- 26 June - (United Kingdom) Saxondale (BBC Prime)
- 8 July - (United States) Sleeper Cell (M-Net)
- 17 July - (United States) Ugly Betty (M-Net)
- 19 July - (United States) On the Lot (SABC2)
- 14 August - (United Kingdom) Green Wing (BBC Prime)
- 23 August - (United States) Brothers & Series (M-Net)
- 1 September - (United Kingdom) Doctor Who Confidential (BBC Prime)
- 25 September - (United Kingdom) Messiah (BBC Prime)
- 2 October - (United Kingdom) Derren Brown: Russian Roulette (BBC Prime)
- 8 October - (United Kingdom) Hotel Babylon (BBC Prime)
- 9 October - (United Kingdom) Derren Brown: Séance (BBC Prime)
- 10 October - (United States) Day Break (M-Net)
- 16 October - (United Kingdom) Hypderdrive (BBC Prime)
- 30 October - (Republic of Ireland) / (United Kingdom) / (United States) / (Canada) The Tudors (M-Net)
- 31 October - (United States) Lincoln Heights (M-Net Series)
- 2 November - (United States) Malcolm & Eddie (Sony Channel)
- 3 November - (United Kingdom) Robin Hood (SABC2)
- 10 November - (United States) Notes from the Underbelly (M-Net Series)
- 14 November - (United States) Jericho (SABC3)
- 22 November - (United States) Hidden Palms (Go)
- 2 December - (United States) The Riches (M-Net)
- 4 December - (United Kingdom) Star Stories (BBC Prime)
- 4 December - (United Kingdom) Suburban Shootout (BBC Prime)
- 10 December - (United States) State of Mind (M-Net)
- 20 December - (United Kingdom) The Story of India (SABC2)
- (Canada) Lunar Jim (M-Net)
- (France) Panshel's World (M-Net)
- (Canada) / (Japan) Spider Riders (SABC2)
- (Canada) Grossology (M-Net)
- (United States) / (Canada) / (China) Sagwa, the Chinese Siamese Cat (SABC2)
- (United Kingdom) / (France) The Large Family (SABC2)

=== Changes of network affiliation ===
Shows	Moved from	Moved to
(United States) My Little Pony	SABC1	M-Net
(United Kingdom) Little Monsters	K-T.V. World	M-Net
(United States) The Wubbulous World of Dr. Seuss	SABC2	M-Net
(United States) The Guardian	SABC2	Sony Channel
(Canada) / (Denmark) Mumble Bumble	SABC2	e.tv
(Germany) Ted Sieger's Wildlife	SABC2	e.tv
(United States) C Bear and Jamal	Bop TV	e.tv
(United States) / (Canada) Eek! The Cat	kykNET	e.tv
(United States) Mortal Kombat: Defenders of the Realm	M-Net	e.tv
(United States) The Wire	M-Net	e.tv
(United States) Everwood	M-Net	SABC3
(United Kingdom) Little Red Tractor	M-Net	SABC3
(United Kingdom) Legend of the Dragon	M-Net	SABC3
(United States) Friday Night Lights	M-Net	Go
(United States) Brothers & Sisters	M-Net	M-Net Series
(United States) Shark	M-Net	M-Net Series
(United States) Desperate Housewives	M-Net	M-Net Series
(United States) Big Love	M-Net	M-Net Series
(Republic of Ireland) / (United Kingdom) / (United States) / (Canada) The Tudors	M-Net	M-Net Series
(United States) Nip/Tuck	M-Net	M-Net Series
(France) / (Belgium) Cédric	M-Net	SABC1
(United States) Tom and Jerry Kids	Cartoon Network	SABC1
(United Kingdom) Hustle	SABC3	BBC Prime
(United States) The War at Home	M-Net Series	SABC3

== Television shows ==
=== 1980s ===
- Good Morning South Africa (1985–present)
- Carte Blanche (1988–present)

=== 1990s ===
- Top Billing (1992–present)
- Generations (1994–present)
- Isidingo (1998–present)

=== 2000s ===
- Idols South Africa (2002–present)
- Strictly Come Dancing (2006-2008, 2013–2015)

== New channels ==
- 1 June: CNBC Africa
- 2 November: Sony Channel

== See also ==
- 2007 in South Africa
