= 1976 in South African television =

List of years in South African television
- … 1966; 1967; 1968; 1969; 1970; 1971; 1972; 1973; 1974; 1975; 1976; 1977; 1978; 1979; 1980; 1981; 1982; 1983; 1984; 1985; 1986 …
- Art; Archaeology; Architecture; Literature; Music; Philosophy; Science; +...

This is a list of South African television-related events in 1976.

== Events ==
- 5 January - after a year of experimental broadcasts in the main cities, South African Broadcasting Corporation (SABC) television service officially opened nationwide.

== Debuts ==
- South Africa's first television soap opera The Dingleys is aired, and is panned by critics and audiences.

== Television shows ==
=== 1970s ===
- Haas Das se Nuuskas (1976–1980)

== Ending this year ==
- No shows ending this year.

== Births ==
- 9 February — Colin Moss, actor and television host

== See also ==
- 1976 in South Africa
