= 2011 in South Africa =

- Decades: 1990s; 2000s; 2010s; 2020s
- See also: List of years in South Africa

The following lists events that happened during 2011 in South Africa.

== Incumbents ==
- President – Jacob Zuma
- Deputy President – Kgalema Motlanthe
- Chief Justice – Sandile Ngcobo then Mogoeng Mogoeng

=== Cabinet ===
The Cabinet, together with the President and the Deputy President, forms part of the Executive.

=== Provincial Premiers ===
- Eastern Cape Province: Noxolo Kiviet
- Free State Province: Ace Magashule
- Gauteng Province: Nomvula Mokonyane
- KwaZulu-Natal Province: Zweli Mkhize
- Limpopo Province: Cassel Mathale
- Mpumalanga Province: David Mabuza
- North West Province: Thandi Modise
- Northern Cape Province: Hazel Jenkins
- Western Cape Province: Helen Zille

== Events ==
February

- 9 – A generator fails catastrophically while performing overspeed testing at Duvha Power Station.

May

- 18 – Municipal elections take place.

October

- 7 – The 14th Dalai Lama is unable to attend the 80th birthday celebration of fellow Nobel Peace Prize laureate Desmond Tutu, having again been refused a visa to enter South Africa.

== Deaths ==
- 29 January – Fanus Rautenbach, Afrikaans radio and media personality. (b. 1928)
- 18 February – Lucas Maree, South African singer. (b. 1952)
- 12 March – Hubert du Plessis, South African composer and pianist. (b. 1922)
- 16 March – Carel Boshoff, South African politician, founder of Orania. (b. 1927)
- 24 March – Henry Gordon Makgothi, teacher, defiance campaigner and 1956 treason trialist. (b. 1928)
- 2 June – Albertina Sisulu, anti–apartheid activist, widow of Walter Sisulu. (b. 1918)
- 15 June – Zack du Plessis, Afrikaans actor. (b. 1949)
- 22 June – Kader Asmal, politician. (b. 1934)
- 11 July – King Maxhob'ayakhawuleza Sandile, Rarabe King. (b. 1956)
- 13 July – Al Debbo, South African actor, comedian and singer. (b. 1924)
- 18 July – Magnus Malan, Minister of Defence. (b. 1930)
- 11 September – Deon du Plessis, newsman. (b. 1952)
- 26 October – Dick Lord, South African Air Force and Fleet Air Arm fighter pilot. (b. 1936)
- 22 December – Zithulele Sinqe, long distance athlete. (b, 1963)
- 25 December – John Christoffel Kannemeyer, writer, authority on Afrikaans literature. (b. 1939).
- 29 December – Amichand Rajbansi, leader of the Minority Front in the South African Parliament. (b. 1942).

== Railways ==
=== Locomotives ===
- January – Transnet Rail Engineering at Koedoespoort takes delivery of the first two of ten imported Class 43-000 General Electric type C30ACi diesel-electric locomotives for Transnet Freight Rail.
- July – The first of the 133 locally built Class 43-000 locomotives rolls out at the Koedoespoort shops in Pretoria.

== See also ==
- 2011 in South African television
