= Romanza+ África =

African English-language digital television network

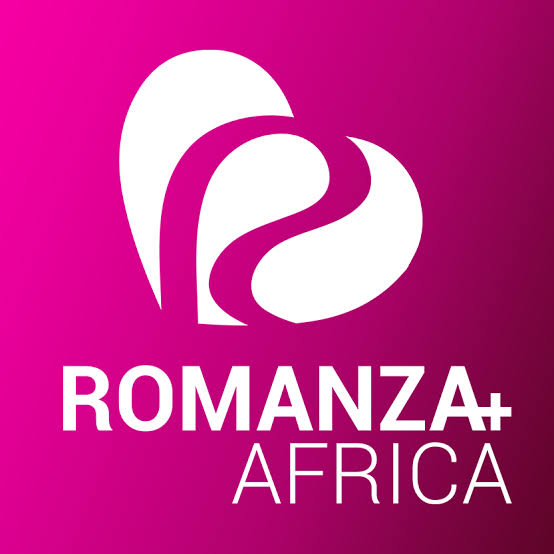
- Country: Kenya
- Broadcast area: Africa (English-speaking world)

Programming
- Language: English
- Picture format: 1080i HDTV

Ownership
- Owner: TV Azteca Networks (TV Azteca); Cisneros Group; AfricaXP

History
- Launched: May 1, 2014

Romanza+ África is an English-language African digital television network, owned by TV Azteca and Cisneros Group and distributed by AfricaXP.

The channel's programming is mainly telenovelas dubbed into English, including the extensive catalog of telenovelas from TV Azteca and Venevisión. was launched by the telenovelas boom in Africa.

== History ==
It was announced in April at the 2014 MIPTV conference in Cannes, France, where Marcel Vinay from TV Azteca and César Díaz from Grupo Cisneros confirmed the launch of this channel for the English-speaking world of Africa, in collaboration with Craig Kelly from AfricaXP, was launched to air on May 1, 2014, through the service of digital TV provider Bamba TV in Kenya, The channel broadcast its first telenovelas: Catalina y Sebastián from TV Azteca and Secreto de amor from Venevisión.

After almost its first year of broadcast, it was recorded to have reached 4.5 million homes according to Bamba TV throughout Kenya.

== Coverage ==
The channel broadcasts on South Africa, Tanzania, Kenya, Uganda, Zambia, Zimbabwe, Ghana and Nigeria, with plans to expand in Botswana, Malawi, Namibia, Rwanda, Mauritius and Seychelles markets.
