= Me (TV channel) =

South African TV channel

Me (M-Net Essentials)
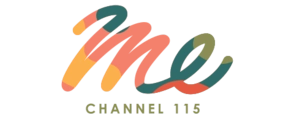
- Country: South Africa
- Broadcast area: Sub Saharan Africa
- Network: M-Net Series (formerly)
- Affiliates: M-Net
- Headquarters: Johannesburg

Programming
- Language: English
- Picture format: 1080i HDTV (downscaled to 16:9 576i for the SDTV feed)

Ownership
- Owner: MultiChoice
- Sister channels: M-Net; 1max; Abol TV; Africa Magic; Akwaaba Magic; Channel O; SuperSport; KykNET; Maisha Magic; M-Net Movies; Mzansi Magic; Zambezi Magic

History
- Launched: 1 April 1998; 28 years ago
- Replaced: Vuzu (merge)
- Closed: 31 March 2024; 2 years ago
- Former names: The Series Channel (1998–2005); M-Net Series (2005–2013); M-Net Series Zone (2013–2015); M-Net City (2015–2021)

Links
- Website: Official website

Availability

Terrestrial
- DStv: Channel 115

Streaming media
- DStv App

M-Net Essentials, (Note: The channel's official website designates it as Me channel 115 - M-Net Essentials.) branded on-air as Me was a originally launched by M-Net on 9 July 2013 as M-Net Series Zone, one of three channels from the parent M-Net Series channel.

It rebranded as M-Net City in 2015 and as Me in 2021, the latter from a merger with Vuzu. It broadcast on satellite television service DStv on channel 115 until its closure on 31 March 2024.

== History ==
The channel began on 1 April 1998 as The Series Channel, eventually rebranded as M-Net Series to align with the parent M-Net channel in 2005.

On 9 July 2013, the channel broke into a three-channel network consisting of M-Net Series Showcase, M-Net Series Reality and M-Net Series Zone. M-Net Series Showcase was touted by M-Net as "its main network for the launch of current serial programming, M-Net Series Reality airing reality television programming and M-Net Series Zone (this channel's adopted name) airing delayed programming from M-Net. However, within a year of launch, the channel formats of M-Net Series Showcase and M-Net Series Reality failed and got respectively rebranded as VUZU Amp and M-Net Edge on 13 and 20 October 2014.

=== As "M-Net City" (2015–2021) ===
On 6 April 2015, M-Net Series Zone was rebranded as M-Net City #115, the channel number suffix getting dropped the following year.

Typically, M-Net City featured reruns of international television serial programming previously aired on parent channel M-Net along with some homegrown shows, the former M-Net Edge, and sister channel 1Magic (rebranded from VUZU Amp on 1 March 2018) and Mzansi Magic.

=== As "Me" (2021–2024) ===
On 1 October 2021, M-Net announced that VUZU would be merged into M-Net City and be rebranded as Me effective from 1 November.

M-Net City signed off the air after 29 October for a 2-day channel reel promoting the premiere of its successor, along with VUZU, with the successor assuming its channel run 3 days later at 16:00 CAT. As of 23 June 2023, the channel's official website designates the channel as M-Net Essentials while still maintaining its Me on-air branding.

The channel ceased operations on 31 March 2024, along with 1Magic.
