= Kerwhizz =

British children's television game show

- Genre: Children's game show
- Created by: Tony Reed and Alan Robinson
- Written by: Katie Simmons; Alan Robinson; Helen Baker; Barry Quinn; Stephen Cannon; Feri Tezcan; Adam Redfern; Simon Davies
- Presented by: Jacob Scipio
- Voices of: Telka Donyai; Alex Velleman; Kriselle Basilio; Yasmin Garrad; Jermaine Woods
- Country of origin: United Kingdom
- Original language: English
- No. of series: 2
- No. of episodes: 41

Production
- Executive producer: Stephen Cannon
- Producer: Alison Stewart
- Running time: 22 minutes
- Production companies: BBC; Studio 100

Original release
- Network: CBeebies
- Release: 7 November 2008 – 25 March 2011

Kerwhizz (strapline: The Quiz with added Whizz) is a British live-action animated children's television game show created by Tony Reed and Alan Robinson, which originally aired on CBeebies between 2008 and 2011. The series uses a mix of CGI and live action, and is targeted towards 4-6-year-olds. Series 1 was filmed in March 2008, and Series 2 was filmed two years later in July 2010.

== Summary ==
Kerwhizz is moderated and presented by the Kerwhizzitor (Jacob Scipio), the only regular live-action character. Three teams of two CGI characters, each comprising a human child racer and a part-living, part-mechanical animal pet, must answer five rounds of questions, each featuring a regular 2D animated animal character, to win a choice of pod mod for their respective racing pods. In addition, one of the five rounds offers the chance to win a mystery pod mod. Each pod mod and mystery mod is an unconventional accessory that may or may not give its user a better chance of winning the race. The teams are cheered on by three groups of live-action children dressed in the teams' colours and waving team flags. Points are scored based on how many questions are answered correctly.

All of the questions are multiple-choice with the answers being colour-coded red, green, yellow, and blue. Once the question rounds are complete, the teams choose their pod mods. Then, the teams' pods are assembled and built around them and their respective pod mods are installed, fitted and added to their pods. The pods are then raised through the roof of the studio into the CGI race world. Each race world is a themed racing environment (the questions usually include clues to the theme) containing three or occasionally four zones and each story and race comprises two or occasionally three laps (except in "The Deserted Desert Dash" which is a novelty race with no set route and a hidden finish line). All of the teams are likely to encounter unexpected setbacks and opportunities along the way, making the outcome of each race unpredictable. Each episode ends when the race is won and the winner revealed, after which some of the teams are shown doing activities based on the theme of the race, announced by the Kerwhizzitor.

== Cast and characters ==
=== Questionmaster ===
- Kerwhizzitor (voiced by Jacob Scipio) is a young man who moderates the quiz, asks the questions, makes bad puns and rhymes based on the theme and tries to keep the teams in order. In the race world and the story world, sequences Kerwhizzitor commentates.

=== Contestants ===
- Team Ninki comprises Ninki (voiced by Kriselle Basilio), a dark-skinned Mid-European girl with bunches and a singing voice that is commonly said to be "terrible" (although while introducing her team at the beginning of every episode she sings well); and Pip, a green-furred bipedal Scottish terrier with an extendable metal neck. Pip cannot speak, but can often shape his barks and growls into an approximation of words. Despite this, Ninki sometimes fails to hear him when he has an answer to a question and offers her own answer, which is usually incorrect, instead, causing him to growl in frustration.
- Team Twist comprises Twist (voiced by Alex Velleman), a blonde haired Caucasian boy with a fixation for style; and Snout (voiced by Jermaine Woods, uncredited in series 2 for unknown reasons), who resembles an orange-furred, two legged woolly mammoth with a plastic trunk and has a fixation of his own with sprouts. In the episode "Planet Snout", the eponymous planet is revealed to be his home world and the origin of his sprout obsession. It is also revealed that Snout has two nephews called Rocco and Rico.
- Team Kit comprises Kit (voiced by Telka Donyai), a fair-skinned Japanese girl with blue hair who is very brainy and good at thinking around problems; and Kaboodle (voiced by Yasmin Garrad), who is basically a furry ball creature with two conical plastic ears/antennae and a springy conical plastic leg. She appears to be less mature than the other racers and often requires emotional support from Kit. She is able to electrify anything after bouncing for long enough.

=== Question hosts ===
These characters appear in the flash-animated question sequences. None of them speaks, since the questions are all read by the Kerwhizzitor. In many episodes, they, or characters based on their designs, also appear in CGI form in the race world sequences, where they are much bigger than the human contestants.

- Natterjack the Toad presents two questions per episode based on picture recognition. A typical question might involve the teams identifying one of four pictures that is identical to one that Natterjack has drawn.
- Burping Hurbert the Burpasaur presents one question based on visual memory. This typically involves Hurbert eating one of several objects and the teams having to choose which one it was from four alternatives.
- King Pong the Skunk presents "Hunt That Skunk", in which he hides in or behind four objects in rapid succession. Pip, Snout, and Kaboodle have to decide which object was his last hiding place in order to win the Mystery Mod. King Pong's appearance is always heralded by a smelly green vapour. Occasionally he is replaced by his relatives, such as the pirate Long Pong Silver (who smells even worse than King Pong himself), or by Queen Pong or Princess Pong (who both smell very nice and produce fragrant pink vapour, unlike King Pong himself).
- Kat Kool the Cat presents "Kat Kool's Sound Round", a question based on auditory memory. Typically Kat Kool or his band will play a tune, and the teams must then choose which of four alternative tunes matches.

== Episodes ==
=== Series 1 (2008-2009) ===
1. Vegetable Valley Alley
2. The Slip and Slide Snow Ride
3. Castle Kingdom
4. Bedroom Zoom
5. The Daring Dino Dash
6. Hattrick Highway
7. Funfair Freeway
8. The Great Space Race
9. Bowling Alley Rally
10. The Ace Choc Chase Race
11. Underwater Whizzway
12. The Supershape Showdown
13. Egypt World
14. Supermarket Sprint
15. Goldfish Gulp
16. Whiffy World
17. Opposite World
18. Crazy Racy Golf
19. Daredevil Dreamway
20. The Fairy Tale Trail
21. The Marvellous Musical Marathon
22. Party Paradise
23. The Four Seasons Freeway
24. The Super Ace Rainbow Race
25. Moonlight Night Flight
26. Fun Food Freeway

=== Series 2 (2011) ===
1. Building Block Rock
2. The Ker-Razy Cave
3. The Play Place Race
4. Spooky Speedway
5. The Speedy Greedy Bake Race
6. Wild West World
7. The Overgrown Garden Gateway
8. City Speedway
9. The Giant Jungle Jetway
10. Arty Crafty Caper
11. Treasure Island Trail
12. The Toy Factory Track
13. Planet Snout
14. The Zoom Around The Moon
15. The Deserted Desert Dash

== Languages ==
Languages	Title	Channels
Albanian	Kwizzer	Bang Bang
Arabic	صشظضظض	Baream
Bulgarian (Voice-over)	Келмёгг	Super7
Croatian	Quizzer	RTL
Czech	Přǐšroubavat	Déčko
Danish	Quizzer	Cartoon Network
Dutch	Kwiswat	Ketnet
English (Untied Kingdom)	Kerwhizz	Channel 4 (Untied Kingdom)
English (Untied States)	Kerwhizz	Boomerang (Untied States)
Estonian (Voice-over)	Kerwhizz	Kidzone TV
Finnish	Tietitokulpa	Yle TV2
French	Superquiz	Nickelodeon
German	Kerwizz	Super RTL
Greek	Κερσηιζζ	Nickelodeon
Hebrew	השת״שכך״שט	Hop!
Hindi	Kerwhizz	Pogo
Hungarian	Csürcsavarosdi	M2
Icelandic	Quizzer	RÚV
Indonesian	Kerwhizz	Nickelodeon
Irish	Kewhizz	RTÉ2
Italian	Kerwhizz	Cartoonito
Japanese		Cartoon Network
Kazakh	Қәгймллы	Balapan
Korean		EBS
Latvian (Voice-over)	Kerwhizz	Kidzone TV
Lithuanian (Voice-over)	Kerwhizz	Kidzone TV
Macedonian	Кёаӷббф	Sitel
Malay		Cartoon Network
Mandarin (China)		CCTV-14
Mandarin (Tawian)		YoYo TV
Norwegian	Quizzer	Cartoon Network
Polish	Kwizzer	CBeebies
Portuguese (Brazil)	Kerwhizz	Gloob
Portuguese (Portugal)	Kerwhizz	Canal Panda (Portugal)
Romanian	Quizzer	Minimax
Russian (Dub)	Кервизз	STS
Russian (Voice-over)	Unkown	Kidzone TV
Scottish Galiec	Kiwerrz	BBC Alba
Serbian	Kwhizzer	Minimax
Slovak	Kvizer	Jojko
Slovenian	Kwhizzer	Minimax
Spainsh (Latin Amercia)	Kerwhizz	CBeebies
Spainsh (Spain)	Kerwhizz	Cartoonito Clan TVE
Swedish	Quizzer	Cartoon Network
Tatar	Кежлоууй	Shayan TV
Thai		TONEE
Turkish	Kerwhizz	MinikaÇouck
Ukrainian	КенрЇьь	PlusPlus

== Production ==
Development of the series was revealed in February 2008, when CBeebies had commissioned a multi-platform gameshow that combines live-action with CGI animated elements. CBeebies' in-house production arm, CBeebies Production, was appointed to produce the series while Blue Zoo Animation Studio provided animation services. Two months later, Belgian children's production company Studio 100 had joined the series as a co-producer and shared distribution rights with the BBC.

== Broadcast ==
- Nederlands: Ketnet
- Hebrew: Hop! Channel
- Hungarian: M2
- South Africa: M-Net
- Spanish: CBeebies
- United Kingdom: CBeebies, BBC One

== Reception ==
British psychologist Aric Sigman refers to Kerwhizz as a perfect example of what television makers claim is educational, despite his insistence to the contrary.

== Lawsuit ==
In 2011, cartoonist Michael Mitchell sued the BBC and CBeebies, claiming that Kerwhizz's human CGI characters were based on his own designs for a proposed series called The Bounce Bunch. BBC and CBeebies denied these claims, pointing out that any similarities between the characters were coincidental. That December, in the England and Wales Patents County Court, His Honour Judge Birss, QC found that the Kerwhizz characters did not infringe Mr Mitchell's copyright.
