= City of Friends =

Children's animated series from Norway

City of Friends (Norwegian: Vennebyen) is a Norwegian animated children's television series created by Carl Christian Hamre of CreaCon Entertainment. The TV show itself presents stories for young children about policemen, fire service personnel and medical service personnel.

The series first aired in Norway on TV 2 in 2010, simultaneously with TV 2 Denmark, TV4 Sweden and MTV3 Finland. During its production phase, Parthenon Entertainment (later renamed Sky Vision) distributed the series outside of Scandinavia.

In 2015, the IP's founders decided to sell it to TA Tolv. Hamre, the series creator, left CreaCon on 31 March of that year. The new shareholders planned the creation of a feature film, set to be released in the first half of 2017. The plan for a feature film was revived in early 2026 by Bergen locals, who aimed to find Scandinavian partners for funding.

== Characters ==
- Max:

Max is everyone's friend and the city's mischief-maker. He is also the only monkey in the world who is a police man, or at least a recruit. Although Max might appear to be a self-centered champ, he is helpful and kind. The children in the city think he is the coolest and the funniest in the whole city. A running gag in the series is that Max always loses Hayley's helicopter keys right when she is needed for an emergency.

- Elphie:

Elphie is an adventure-loving elephant. Her impressive trunk and its water-shooting abilities make her a natural fire-fighter, and she holds the proud position as the only elephant in the city's emergency services.

- Ted:

The caring young teddy bear is starting his life in the ambulance service. He loves his job and is responsible for packing the medical supplies. He is very popular and offers great comfort to people in need, providing reassurance with his cuddly warmth.

- Jumpi:

Jumpi is a very active hare and Mia and Martin's best friend. He has a tendency to land in situations which he is unable to get out of without the help of others. He is clumsy, naive, careless and inquisitive. His favorite food is carrots. During the daytime, Jumpi goes to school and is in the same class as Martin and Mia.

- Petey:

Petey is the city's police car. He thinks that he is the coolest car in the whole city, and that absolutely nothing can compete with him when it comes to speed and looking good. Petey is driven by Tiffany and in the back, there is a cage for Timba, the police dog. Petey is an electric car, just like all the other vehicles in the City.

- Frankie:

Frankie is the city's lovely red fire engine, and he is the oldest and most experienced vehicle in the city. Tom is Frankie's driver, and Barney is his regular partner. Elphie the elephant sits in the basket that has been specially designed for her. As with the other city vehicles, Frankie runs on electricity. He has been a part of the Fire Service for at least 15 years, making him one of the older vehicle characters in the series.

- Abby:

Abby is the ambulance in the City of Friends and if anyone is in need of help, she will be on her way in no time with her sirens blaring and the lights flashing. Abby is warm and caring and is never far away when something happens. She loves it whenever she gets a call-out with the rest of her team, Ted and Tina. As with all the vehicles in the city, Abby also runs on electricity. Abby is unique amongst the vast majority of the show's vehicle characters in that she has more than one episode focusing on her; most of the others with that distinction are only given one spotlight episode.

- Hayley:

Haley is the helicopter in the city. Hayley braves heights, dangers, and inclement weather to provide assistance. Hayley is not afraid of anything, but when she is not out flying, she is parked on the roof of the police station. Hayley's regular pilot is Max. A running gag in the series is that Max always loses Hayley's helicopter keys right when she is needed for an emergency.

- Scoot:

Scoot is Max's exercise wheel. He accompanies this energetic little monkey through thick and thin, including most call-outs. Scoot stands in his parking slot right next to the tree where Max has his tree house. If the alarm sounds, Max swings down the rope and lands on top of Scoot. Unlike most of the other emergency vehicle characters, Scoot cannot speak vocally, and instead makes honking sounds.

- Barney:

Barney is Bobby's twin brother and Ted's uncle. He is also the chief of the fire station in the City of Friends, and with his long experience from fighting fires he guides Elphie so that she also can be a fire-elephant-officer.

- Bobby:

Bobby is the police chief of the City of Friends. He is the twin brother of Barney, the fire chief. Bobby is Ted's father, and is a trusty bear for the residents of the city and not least for all the others at the police station.

- Gi:

Gi is one of the two giraffes in the City of Friends. Her long neck is very useful when she's on lookout duty in her tower at the police station. She keeps an eye out for thieves, fires, accidents or anything else that might be of interest to the city's emergency services. Her name and Raffe's are halves of the word "giraffe".

- Raffe:

Raffe is the second giraffe in the City of Friends. His long neck is very useful when he's on lookout duty in his tower at the fire station. He keeps an eye out for thieves, fires, accidents or anything else that might be of interest to the city's emergency services. His name and Gi's are halves of the word "giraffe".

- Kimmy:

Kimmy the kangaroo hops around the city delivering the post. In her pouch she carries letters and parcels intended for the city's residents. In addition to delivering the post she also has many stories to tell. That is probably why she is known as the city's biggest chatterbox – she talks incessantly.

- Timba:

Timba is a German Shepherd puppy and police dog in training. He is Tiffany's constant companion and partner. He is an inquisitive, enthusiastic puppy. Timba lives with Tiffany.

- Tom:

Tom has just started working for the fire service in the City of Friends. He is always happy and cheerful, and always ready with a quick response. Tom is Frankie's driver, and when they arrive at a fire it is his job to connect the fire hose to a water supply and to operate it.

- Martin and Mia:

Martin and Mia are active 10-year old twins. They love cycling, running and exploring the countryside and everything they can see around them. Their curiosity and high levels of activity are always getting them into situations that keep the city's emergency services and their recruits busy throughout the week. Their best friend Jumpi is always with them. Mia and Martin's mother and father run the café in the City of Friends. The two siblings are therefore often to be found hanging around the café, and they are good at helping.

- Dad:

Dad is the father of Martin and Mia, and together with mum he runs the city's café. The café has become a meeting place for the city's emergency services and it is famous for its wide range of excellent bread and cakes.

- Mum:

Mum is the mother of Martin and Mia, and together with dad she runs the city's café. The café has become a meeting place for the city's emergency services and it is famous for its wide range of excellent bread and cakes.

- Tina:

Tina has been driving the city's ambulance for many years. The citizens know that if they become ill, injured or need some sort of related help then Tina will come and fix things. She is a healthy, lively girl who decided that she wanted help other people and looking after them to the best of her ability and training.

- Tiffany:

Tiffany is a police officer who is very strict with her troops at the police station. She lives with Timba, the puppy.

== Episodes ==
Series 1

- 1. Follow That Ball
- 2. There's No Smoke
- 3. Clear the Line
- 4. Party Time
- 5. Runaway Jim
- 6. Extreme Biking
- 7. Silence is Golden
- 8. Sorry, I'm Late
- 9. Keep Alert, Raffe
- 10. Treasure Island
- 11. Sticky Buns
- 12. Flat Tire
- 13. Fluffy

Series 2

- 14. Congratulations, Frankie
- 15. Gone Fishing
- 16. Apples For Elphie
- 17. Ted Loses the Bandages
- 18. Keep It A Secret
- 19. Bobby And Barney's Band
- 20. Jumpi's Giant
- 21. Team Effort
- 22. Helmets Are Cool
- 23. Litter Bug
- 24. Mountain Rescue
- 25. The Chocolate Muffin Rescue
- 26. Father And Son

Series 3

- 27. Max To The Max
- 28. Lost in Friend Forest
- 29. Elphie, Get Your Bun
- 30. Down The Drain
- 31. Spot The Bear
- 32. Jumpi's Big Balloon
- 33. Jumpi To The Rescue
- 34. Football Crazy
- 35. Abby's Panic Attack
- 36. Bobby's Sand Castle
- 37. The Case Of The Missing Case
- 38. The Mix-Up
- 39. SOS Bonnie

Series 4

- 40. Where's Scoot
- 41. Painting The Town
- 42. Timba's Day Off
- 43. Round And Round The Houses
- 44. Tom's Alarm Call
- 45. Gi And Raffe's Look Out Duty
- 46. Beware Of The Yeti
- 47. Winter Blunder Land
- 48. Max's Mountain Walk
- 49. Max's Mercy Walk
- 50. Snow Trouble
- 51. One Good Turn
- 52. Duty Before Pleasure
