= Pixel Pinkie =

- Ad for the series with the logo written in the Groovy Happening JNL font.
- Created by: Alicia Rackett
- Directed by: David Gurney
- Composers: Fiora Cutler; Andrei Maberley
- Country of origin: Australia
- No. of seasons: 2
- No. of episodes: 26 (52 segments)

Production
- Executive producers: David Gurney; Jo Horsburgh
- Producer: Alicia Rackett
- Editor: Kevin Gleeson
- Running time: 24 minutes
- Production company: Blue Rocket Productions

Original release
- Network: Nine Network; ABC3
- Release: 29 August 2009 – 15 September 2012

Pixel Pinkie is an Australian children's animated television series produced and created by Blue Rocket Productions in association with the Nine Network and principally funded by The Film Finance Corporation Australia during the first season and then by Screen Australia during the second season. The series aired from 29 August 2009 to 15 September 2012. The show was panned by audiences and critics alike.

== Plot ==
Pixel Pinkie is about two girls, Nina and Anni, who discover a genie named Pixel Pinkie who lives in Nina’s phone and can grant wishes, many of which go wrong. The two girls must solve these problems while keeping Pixel Pinkie a secret.

== Cast ==
- Jane Binning - Pixel Pinkie
- Anica Boulanger-Mashberg - Anni
- Magdalena Grubski - Nina
- Jemma Gates - Suzi
- Sara Cooper - Max
- Nick Storr / Jamie Croft - Coolest Luke

== Production ==
There were two series developed with 52 twelve-minute episodes. In Australia, the twelve-minute episodes are packaged to make 13 twenty-four minute episodes in each series. The first series was developed in 2007 and first aired in 2009, but the second series would not air until 2012, 3 years after the show started.

== Reception ==
The series received mostly negative reviews from audiences focusing on its cheap Flash animation, unlikable characters, and poor voice acting, with many making unfavorable comparisons to The Fairly OddParents, which it has been accused of ripping off. It has a rating of 1.5 on IMDb based on 544 votes.. Cailyn Szelinski of CBR ranks it 6th on the worst 2000s cartoons list, stating that "Pixel Pinkie tries to recreate the magic of Timmy Turner and his best wishes, but doesn't have the same charm.", Szelinski also criticized it for having the main characters be mean to Pixel Pinkie even though they were often the cause of wishes going wrong.

== Episodes ==
=== Series 1 (2009) ===
| No. | Title | Written by | Original release date |
|---|---|---|---|
| 1a | "Meeting Pixel Pinkie" | Stu Connolly | 29 August 2009 |
Nina arrives at her new school where everyone has a mobile phone. She makes a new friend who is Anni and together they buy a phone. The phone turns out to be inhabited by a digital genie called "Pixel Pinkie", who can grant Nina any wish she likes.
| 1b | "Daddy Cool" | Stu Connolly | 29 August 2009 |
The "queen bee" of Plenty High (Suzi) decides to "check out the new girl" by visiting Nina at home. Nina finds her parents and house a bit embarrassing so asks Pixel Pinkie to give her house a makeover, like on TV.
| 2a | "Clones R Us" | Stu Connolly | 5 September 2009 |
Queen bee Suzi is throwing a party and Nina wants to go. There's only one problem - she has to babysit. Pixel Pinkie creates a clone of Nina so she can go to the party, but things fall apart quickly.
| 2b | "Playing Chicken" | Stu Connolly | 5 September 2009 |
Nina thinks her old clothes are holding her back, especially next to fashionable Suzi. Pixel Pinkie gives her an outfit that will get her noticed - but it isn't quite the look Nina was going for.
| 3a | "On the Nose" | Sam Carroll | 16 September 2009 |
Nina thinks a nose ring will be just the thing to be accepted by Suzi and attract Max's attention, but her parents won't let her get one. Nina calls on Pixel Pinkie, but as usual Pinkie misunderstands Nina's wish.
| 3b | "Cracked Idea" | Sam Carroll | 16 September 2009 |
Nina breaks her phone. Fearing she may never see Pixel Pinkie again, she borrows a grey phone cover. Pixel Pinkie returns, but something is different - the phone cover affects Pinkie's personality and she is now a bit grey and boring.
| 4a | "Invisible Nina" | Sam Carroll | 23 September 2009 |
In school camp, Nina, Anni and Pinkie have to share a cabin with Suzi. During the night Suzi uses her phone to take a video of Nina snoring. In the morning Nina is mortified to discover Suzi has sent the video to everyone at school.
| 4b | "Orienteering Disaster" | Sam Carroll | 23 September 2009 |
Suzi and Nina get paired up for orienteering and get lost. Their phones are out of range and Nina can't contact Pixel Pinkie. Suzi throws a tantrum and it gets dark. Nina needs to find mobile coverage.
| 5a | "Valentine's Day" | Stu Connolly | 30 September 2009 |
Anni is a little sad when the boy she likes says Valentine's Day is a waste of time. Nina tries to cheer her up by getting Pixel Pinkie to bring a picture from a magazine to life.
| 5b | "Zoom of Doom" | Stu Connolly | 30 September 2009 |
Nina needs a car to help Vincent transport his band's equipment, so Pixel Pinkie creates a car - but it's a tiny, remote-control car with a mind of its own. The car becomes a little too attached to Nina.
| 6a | "Blinded with Science" | Stu Connolly | 7 October 2009 |
"Planet Pitch" is a save-the-planet competition held in Plenty Mall. Nina helps everyone with their projects because they know her family is very green. They all turn in their projects at once, resulting in bad news for Pixel Pinkie.
| 6b | "Virtual Pest" | Stu Connolly | 7 October 2009 |
All the kids at school are getting virtual pets for their mobiles. Rather than look uncool in front of Max, Nina pretends she has one. Pixel Pinkie creates one for her, but unfortunately "Chomps" is a little obnoxious.
| 7a | "Harvest Hoopla" | Stu Connolly | 14 October 2009 |
The "Harvest Hoopla" festival is on in Plenty and Nina's mum Fern wants to protest against it. To avoid Fern making the news and embarrassing her, Nina gets Pixel Pinkie's help to become the festival director.
| 7b | "Home for the Holidays" | Stu Connolly | 14 October 2009 |
Nina's mum and dad can't settle on a holiday destination so they decide to have a holiday at home instead. Nina is disappointed so she gets Pixel Pinkie to create a tropical holiday resort in the backyard.
| 8a | "Bowled Over" | Sam Carroll | 21 October 2009 |
Nina can't bowl, but when she discovers Max works at the local bowling alley, she tries to impress him. She's challenged to a competition against Suzi, so Pixel Pinkie turns herself into a bowling ball to give Nina an advantage.
| 8b | "Truth or Dare" | Sam Carroll | 21 October 2009 |
While playing 'Truth or Dare', Pixel Pinkie dares Nina to kiss Max. Nina thinks the dare is silly until she becomes Max's study partner and the dare becomes less silly, in fact, it becomes quite possible.
| 9a | "Coolest Luke" | Sam Carroll | 28 October 2009 |
Coolest Luke is playing a concert in Plenty, but Nina and Anni can't afford a ticket. Pixel Pinkie turns them into reporters and they get the next best thing - an interview with Coolest Luke.
| 9b | "Real Cool Girl" | Sam Carroll | 28 October 2009 |
Pixel Pinkie misunderstands a wish from Nina and becomes a real girl, but Pinkie isn't very good at the real world and starts getting into trouble, nearly being run over by a truck and getting thrown out of a Coolest Luke concert.
| 10a | "Dreadful Weather" | Stu Connolly | 4 November 2009 |
Misunderstanding a wish, Pixel Pinkie gives Zeph's dreadlocks the power to predict the future. He becomes the weather man for a local television station and gains minor celebrity status due to his uncannily accurate predictions.
| 10b | "Pink to the Core" | Stu Connolly | 4 November 2009 |
Nina's mum wants to meet her at the 'Core Juice Bar', but Nina is afraid she'll object to the plastic cups. Pixel Pinkie misinterprets Nina's wish to get rid of the cups and instead creates piles of them, sparking a protest.
| 11a | "Tran Zit" | Jackie Turnure | 11 November 2009 |
On the day of singing auditions for the school concert, Nina gets an enormous zit, so she asks Pixel Pinkie to get rid of it and she does - giving it to Anni instead.
| 11b | "The Lost Voice" | Jackie Turnure | 11 November 2009 |
Nina and Suzi must perform a duet at the school concert, but, to Nina's horror, Ms. Domingo wants Nina to sing the male part. Fearing her voice is too deep, Nina wishes for a higher voice from Pixel Pinkie.
| 12a | "Dare to be Scared" | Jackie Turnure | 18 November 2009 |
It's Halloween and to raise money, Anni and Nina want to put on a haunted house tour. Suzi will take the tour but wants her money back if she's not scared enough. Nina and Anni call on Pixel Pinkie's help to scare Suzi.
| 12b | "Trick or Treat" | Jackie Turnure | 18 November 2009 |
Fern makes Nina a weird hippie costume for Halloween that Nina is embarrassed to be seen in. Pixel Pinkie turns Nina's phone into a camera which creates costumes of whatever they photograph. But the costumes are more than just costumes.
| 13a | "Tall Stories" | Stu Connolly | 25 November 2009 |
The semi-finals of the school basketball competition are coming up and Nina wants to help out the team by growing taller. Pixel Pinkie makes her bigger but forgets to make the growing stop.
| 13b | "Grand Final" | Stu Connolly | 25 November 2009 |
Everyone is getting into the spirit of the basketball grand final, including Suzi, who plans a team breakfast. The team gorge themselves at the breakfast and become too bloated to play, so Nina must gather a replacement team.

=== Series 2 (2012) ===
| No. | Title | Written by | Original release date |
|---|---|---|---|
| 14a | "Finding Nina" | Sandy Webster | 23 June 2012 |
Nina worries she's becoming predictable and decides to try some different things. With little time to do everything, Pixel Pinkie creates three extra Ninas.
| 14b | "My Friend Anni, Superstar" | Sam Carroll | 23 June 2012 |
Suzi is organising a karaoke party at the Core Juice Bar. Anni doesn't want to go as she has a voice that can shatter glass. Besides, she has to practice for the Spelling Bee finals. Nina wishes Anni could sing and Pixel Pinkie grants the wish, giving Anni a superb singing voice.
| 15a | "April Fool's Day" | Ben Stephenson | 30 June 2012 |
It's April Fools' Day at Plenty High and CJ plays a practical joke on Nina. Annoyed, Nina decides to play one right back and enlists the help of Anni and Pixel Pinkie to pull it off. CJ, aided by Max and Vincent, retaliate with another, bigger joke that also gets Anni, Suzi, Emily and Nicki.
| 15b | "If the Shoe Fits" | Sandy Webster | 30 June 2012 |
Nina loves her old trainers but they're starting to fall apart. Pixel Pinkie grants Nina a hot new pair of shoes – which to Nina's frustration are impossible to run in and can't be taken off, making it difficult to captain her team in the school sports day.
| 16a | "Trading Places" | Jo Watson | 7 July 2012 |
After yet another wish goes haywire, Nina suggests she could do better than Pixel Pinkie in the complicated business of granting wishes. Pixel Pinkie takes her up on the challenge and the two swap identities.
| 16b | "Ninja Nina" | Belinda Bradley & Franz Docherty | 7 July 2012 |
Nina is distracted by the thought of pairing up with Max in the school martial arts tournament and accidentally tells him she's a black belt. So her ruse isn't uncovered, Pixel Pinkie gives Nina awesome skills, but she trounces Anni in a practice match, causing the Sensei to drop Anni from the competition.
| 17a | "Sick Pixels" | Sandy Webster | 14 July 2012 |
It's Nina's birthday. After an accident involving Nina's mobile and the kitchen sink, Pixel Pixie catches a chill which develops into a genie cold. Now every time she sneezes, her wish-granting powers malfunction and a random, pink object appears from out of nowhere.
| 17b | "More than a Meal" | Ben Stephenson | 14 July 2012 |
Celebrity chef Lulu Melee is coming to school to judge the cooking competition. Nina and Anni plan to impress her with a tofu curry but on the day, Nina forgets to bring the curry powder. Pixel Pinkie provides some but it is so scorchingly hot no one can possibly eat it.
| 18a | "Uncoolest Luke" | Sam Carroll | 21 July 2012 |
After the Plenty Bagpipe Orchestra pulls out of a school fundraiser for their new basketball court, Nina and Anni must come up with a crowd-pleasing act to sell some tickets. Under pressure Anni tells everyone that they've signed up Coolest Luke. There's a problem though: Coolest Luke refuses to set foot inside any school for any reason.
| 18b | "Bad Hair Day" | Ben Stephenson | 21 July 2012 |
It's school photo day and Nina wakes up with a bad case of bed hair. After conventional methods fail Nina is forced to seek Pixel Pinkie's help to fix the problem. Unfortunately Pixel Pinkie misunderstands the brief and gives the hair a mind of its own.
| 19a | "Pixel Punkie" | Sam Carroll | 28 July 2012 |
It's Pixel Pinkie's birthday and Nina is finding her a bit of a handful. She wishes there was someone else for Pixel Pinkie to play with and the wish results in the arrival of Pixel Punkie, another genie.
| 19b | "Nina the Diva" | Ben Stephenson | 28 July 2012 |
Coolest Luke's record company is holding a competition to make a video for his new song - the winners get to help make the real thing. So Nina, Anni, CJ and Vincent team up to make a cool, low-budget video.
| 20a | "The Show Must Go On" | Franz Docherty | 4 August 2012 |
Nina lands the job of directing the school play, a historical drama. Suzi is naturally cast as the Queen and nominates Max to be the King, but there's one drawback – Max can't act. Nina realises the play will be a disaster if Max doesn't get dramatically better.
| 20b | "Extreme Nina" | Kirsty Fisher | 4 August 2012 |
While Anni is keen to have a go on the local skate ramp Nina's fear of heights is holding her back. To add to Nina's frustrations she can see that Max is having a great time ripping it up with champion skater girl Scout.
| 21a | "Not a Laughing Matter" | Belinda Bradley & Franz Docherty | 11 August 2012 |
Nina wants to sing in Plenty High's mid-year concert but arrives too late to sign herself up so Principal Bapple assigns her a comedy spot instead. After some unsuccessful practice sessions Nina realises her jokes are awful and her delivery isn't much better.
| 21b | "Disco Bowling" | Jo Watson | 11 August 2012 |
It's Max's birthday and he's having a disco bowling party at the Alley Cat. Nina really wants to go but is afraid everyone will laugh at her pitiful bowling and dance skills. So she spends the first half of the evening hiding in the shoe-room, wishing she could dance.
| 22a | "Upgrading" | Kirsty Fisher | 18 August 2012 |
Nina's phone is showing its age so with Pixel Pinkie's encouragement she decides to trade it in on a newer model. The new phone has many cool features, including predictive wish-granting
| 22b | "To Fern with Love" | Kirsty Fisher | 18 August 2012 |
After one of Nina's wishes accidentally sends science teacher Mr. Beaker to Peru, the class gets a substitute teacher - Nina's mum, Fern. After worrying everyone will hate her, Nina finds the opposite, Fern is a really good, inspiring teacher and the kids can't get enough of her.
| 23a | "Double Trouble" | Sandy Webster | 25 August 2012 |
It's Halloween and Nina has agreed to take the Peterson twins Trick-or-Treating. Things start to get a bit out of control when Nina wishes the twins would disappear and they become invisible.
| 23b | "Peter Pixel" | Belinda Bradley | 25 August 2012 |
Nina and Anni are in charge of the school dance and book Vincent's band. When Vincent's guitarist from calls in sick, Pixel Pinkie steps in and transforms herself into Peter Pixel.
| 24a | "Nelly the Nag" | Jo Watson | 1 September 2012 |
Nina and Anni go on a school excursion to a local farm. Nina's a bit underwhelmed by her farm job – feeding the chickens – and asks Pixel Pinkie to help out.
| 24b | "Rebel Yell" | Jo Watson | 1 September 2012 |
The unthinkable happens - Anni gets an F on a math test. Nina doesn't seem to be able to cheer her up and idly wishes that Anni would be more relaxed about school. Pixel Pinkie misunderstands however, and turns Anni into an apathetic rebel.
| 25a | "The 'B' Word" | Jo Kasch & Nova Weetman | 8 September 2012 |
Nina wishes she could get as excited about cheerleading as Pixel Pinkie does and the wish is granted. But now whenever someone mentions the word "basketball", Nina is compelled to perform.
| 25b | "Phone Tag" | Sandy Webster | 8 September 2012 |
Nina's school bag breaks and she's forced to borrow Zeph's old backpack. This is so embarrassing, Nina wishes for a new bag and ends up with a bag exactly the same as Suzi, Nicki and Emily's.
| 26a | "Sleepover" | Jo Kasch & Nova Weetman | 15 September 2012 |
Nina and Anni are planning a sleepover and Pixel Pinkie is excited: she's never had a sleepover before. But due to a careless wish, Suzi, Emily and Nicki turn up too.
| 26b | "The Final Countdown" | Kirsty Fisher | 15 September 2012 |
In the series finale, Nina discovers that according to the genie rules she only has nineteen more wishes left before Pixel Pinkie has to move on to a new phone. After some escapades that lead to most of the wishes being wasted, Nina and Anni give Pixel Pinkie a chance what she wishes for, which is for Nina and Anni to visit the digital genie world. Whilst making the most of their visit in Pixel Pinkie's world, the wish (as per usual) wears off and Nina and Anni are transported back to the real world, ending the episode and the series as a whole.
