= Fox (African TV channel) =

Television channel, 2010–2021

FOX
- Country: African countries
- Broadcast area: Africa
- Network: Fox

Programming
- Language: English
- Picture format: 1080i HDTV (downscaled to 16:9 576i for the SDTV feed)
- Timeshift service: Fox +1

Ownership
- Owner: Fox Networks Group Africa (Disney International Operations)
- Parent: 21st Century Fox (News Corporation)
- Sister channels: National Geographic; Nat Geo Wild

History
- Launched: 1 May 2010; 16 years ago
- Closed: 1 October 2021; 4 years ago
- Former names: Fox Entertainment (2010-2013)

Availability

Terrestrial
- GOtv: Channel 19
- DStv: Channel 119

Fox was an African pay television channel, launched in 2010 as the regional variant of the American broadcast network. The channel was a broad-based entertainment channel, unlike its sister channel FX, which restricted its output to older audiences.

== History ==
=== Fox Entertainment (2010–2013) ===
The channel was launched on 1 May 2010 (along with Fox Retro, FX, BabyTV, and the European version of Fuel TV) through TopTV. The network launched with an 18–35 demographic focus, airing mainly programming originated from the United States by the Fox broadcast network and FX, along with other acquired programming.

At launch, the channel took part in the worldwide premiere of The Walking Dead and the "Zombie Invasion Event" promotion that led up to it. After the final episode of the first season of The Walking Dead aired, it re-aired a director's cut of the pilot without editing.

=== Fox (2013–2021) ===
The channel was simply rebranded to Fox on 9 April 2013, shortly after MultiChoice added the channel on DStv. New series were added to the schedule, and it took a more broad-based 18–49 audience focus.

In March 2019, all the Fox Networks Group channels were acquired by The Walt Disney Company due to the acquisition of 21st Century Fox.

On 1 October 2019, FNG networks, including Fox, were removed from StarSat due to failed retransmission consent negotiations, then returned on 24 February 2020 when the parties came to terms.

=== Closure ===
On 24 August 2021, it was announced that Fox would cease broadcasting in Africa on 1 October 2021, along with the Asian and German versions, in favour of most of its content shifting to Star on Disney+, as it launches in the region on 18 May 2022.

== See also ==
- Fox (international)
- Fox Life (African TV channel)
