= M-Net Movies =

South African based films television channel

- Country: South Africa
- Broadcast area: Sub-Saharan Africa
- Network: M-Net
- Headquarters: Johannesburg

Programming
- Languages: English, Afrikaans
- Picture format: 16:9 (SDTV, HDTV)

Ownership
- Owner: MultiChoice (Canal+ S.A.)

History
- Launched: 6 October 1995; 31 years ago
- Replaced: M-Net Movies Premiere M-Net Movies Action+ M-Net Movies Zone
- Former names: Movie Magic; Movie Magic 2 (1995-2005)

Links
- Website: See below

Availability

Terrestrial
- GOtv: Channel 11 (M-Net Movies+); Channel 50 (M-Net Movies Legends); Channel 53 (M-Net Movies Stars)
- DStv: Channel 106 (M-Net Movies+); Channel 107 (M-Net Movies Stars); Channel 108 (M-Net Movies Legends)

Streaming media
- DStv Stream: Same as its TV platform

M-Net Movies is a group of South Africa-based film-only television channels launched as Movie Magic in 1995 and broadcast across Sub-Saharan Africa on pay TV satellite services DStv and GOtv. The channels broadcast films/movies based on genre as well as clips featuring behind-the-scenes looks at previous, current and future breakout box office hit films.

== History ==
MultiChoice through M-Net launched two M-Net film/movie channels, Movie Magic 1 and Movie Magic 2 a day after the launch of its pay television satellite service DStv. In order to unify/expand the M-Net brand, the channels were renamed respectively M-Net Movies 1 and M-Net Movies 2 in 2005. Two additional film channels, M-Net Stars and M-Net Movies Action (which on launch replaced M-Net Action (then actionX) which launched in 2006), were later launched. In October 2012, the previous film channels were expanded to six channels which grouped films according to genre. These channels, along with the existing Action, Stars and Zone, made for a total of nine movie channels. In June M-Net Movies Action was made an HD channel, followed by M-Net Movies All Stars, both only in Southern Africa, in October 2016.

On 1 September 2020, M-Net stopped giving their movie channels names and went with the numbering system and reduced the number of movie channels from 6 to 4 channels. M-Net Movies also has an Add Movies feature which allows non-premium subscribers to pay for premium movie channels including future pop-up channels.

On 16 September 2026, M-Net Movies 1 and 2 merged into M-Net Movies+ with M-Net Movies 3 becoming M-Net Movies Stars (revived in the process) and M-Net Movies 4 becoming M-Net Movies Legends.
