= M-Net Edge =

- Country: South Africa
- Broadcast area: South Africa and the rest of Sub-Sahara Africa
- Headquarters: Johannesburg

Programming
- Language(s): English
- Picture format: 16:9 HDTV

Ownership
- Owner: Naspers

History
- Launched: 20 October 2014; 10 years ago
- Closed: 1 April 2017; 8 years ago

Links
- Website: http://mnetseries.dstv.com/

Availability

Terrestrial
- Sentech: Channel depends on nearest Sentech repeater

M-Net Edge was a channel broadcast by South African pay TV satellite network DStv.

== Launched ==
It was launched on 20 October 2014, after the discontinuation of two of M-Net's Series channels.

== Closed ==
The channel ceased its operations on 1 April 2017 as it was going to be integrated with M-Net.

== Programming ==
- Bates Motel
- Better Call Saul
- Billions
- Game of Thrones
- Girls
- Gotham
- Grimm
- House of Cards
- Killjoys
- Lucifer
- Person of Interest
- Rome
- Shameless
- Stalker
- Transparent
- Vikings
- Vinyl
