= M-Net Series =

- Country: South Africa
- Broadcast area: Sub-Saharran Africa
- Network: M-Net
- Headquarters: Johannesburg

Programming
- Language: English
- Picture format: 16:9 SDTV, HDTV

Ownership
- Owner: Naspers
- Sister channels: Vuzu; M-Net Movies; KykNET; Channel O Mzansi Magic; Mzansi Music

History
- Launched: 1 April 1998; 27 years ago
- Closed: 5 April 2015; 10 years ago
- Replaced by: M-Net; M-Net Essentials
- Former names: The Series Channel (1998–2005); M-Net Series (2005–2015)

Links
- Website: M-Net Series website (Archived)

Availability

Terrestrial
- Sentech: Channel depends on nearest Sentech repeater

M-Net Series is a defunct group of television channels broadcast by South African pay TV satellite network M-Net across Sub-Saharran Africa on DStv. Most of the programmes broadcast are repeats of episodes previously shown on M-Net.

== History ==
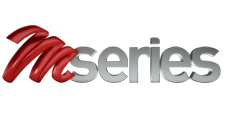
M-Net Series logo used from 2000 to 2013

A single series channel was introduced as The Series Channel in 1998 as a sister channel to the original M-Net channel. On August 2005, it was renamed as M-Net Series.

On 9 July 2013, the single M-Net Series channel was split into three channels, namely M-Net Series Showcase, which was broadcast in HD, M-Net Series Reality and M-Net Series Zone. M-Net Series Showcase, which was broadcast in high definition, previously served as the primary series channel on which most new content unique to Series was broadcast. M-Net Series Reality broadcast talk shows and other reality media. M-Net Series Zone served as a catch-up channel and features previous seasons of shows. Several TV shows also run back-to-back in marathon blocks.

On 11 September 2014, it was announced that Series Showcase and Series Reality would be discontinued and replaced with two new channels, VUZU AMP and M-Net Edge, on 20 and 13 October, respectively. Only one channel of the original three, M-Net Series Zone, remains. The standalone channel is reminiscent of the initial M-Net Series channel, in that it airs shows that previously aired on the main M-Net channel. It was rebranded as M-Net City in 2015.

== M-Net Series Channels ==
M-Net Edge

VUZU AMP (Previously M-Net Series Showcase & M-Net Series Reality)

M-Net City (Previously M-Net Series Zone)

Channel Number	Previous Name	Current name	Launch	Re-Launch
102	N/A	M-Net Edge	2014	N/A
113	M-Net Series Showcase	1Magic	2013	2014
114	M-Net Series Reality	1Magic	2013	2014
115	M-Net Series Zone	M-Net City	2013	2015

== Broadcasting history ==
M-Net is well known for its premium television broadcast of TV shows that are exclusively a first in Africa straight after the U.S. broadcast. A well known number of shows have aired spanning from reality shows to drama oriented ones. Pre 2013 the channel was based upon a singular core channel mainly M-Net Series as a stand-alone channel having different blocks to air specific types of shows. Prior to 2013 the channel was split into three channels mostly M-Net Showcase & Reality both having HD capability whilst Zone wasn't upgraded as viewers of the channel experienced SD. With the launch of M-Net Edge the channel only broadcasts in the evenings from 18:30 (CAT).

== See also ==
- DStv
- M-Net Literary Awards
- 1Magic
- MultiChoice
- Vuzu
- M-Net
