= M-Net =

Subscription TV channel in South Africa

- Country: South Africa
- Broadcast area: Sub-Saharan Africa
- Headquarters: Randburg

Programming
- Languages: Afrikaans; English; Sotho; Tsonga; Tswana; Venda; Xhosa; Zulu
- Picture format: 1080i HDTV (downscaled to 16:9 576i for the SDTV feed)
- Timeshift service: M-Net +1 (defunct as of 2021)

Ownership
- Owner: MultiChoice (Canal+ S.A.)
- Sister channels: Abol TV; Africa Magic; Akwaaba Magic; Channel O; kykNET; Maisha Magic; M-Net Movies; Mzansi Magic; Novela Magic; OneZed; Pearl Magic; SuperSport; Zambezi Magic; Kwenda Magic; Manigue Magic; 1Max; Me; 1Magic

History
- Launched: 4 October 1986; 40 years ago

Links
- Website: M-Net website

Availability

Terrestrial
- Sentech: Channel depends on nearest repeater
- DStv: Channel 101 (HD)

Streaming media
- DStv Stream: Channel based on Internet connection availability

M-Net (an abbreviation of Electronic Media Network) is a South African pay television channel established by Naspers in 1986. The channel broadcasts both local and international programming, including general entertainment, children's series, sport and movies. While the TV signal is generally encrypted, M-Net showed some programmes 'free to air' in its "Open Time" slot between 5 p.m. and 7 pm, until the slot closed on 1 April 2007.

In the early 1990s, M-Net added a second analogue channel called Community Services Network (CSN), and began digital broadcasting via satellite to the rest of Africa, via its sister company MultiChoice (now owned by Canal+ S.A.). With the introduction of MultiChoice's multi-channel digital satellite TV service, DStv, in 1995, several different channels have been created to complement the original M-Net channel, including the now-defunct M-Net Series and several film/movie channels based on genre and preference.

The channel also had a separate terrestrial feed which, in 2011, still had composite programming from kykNET and SuperSport. Its legacy subscriber base was moved to DStv or GOtv when the analogue terrestrial service was switched off.

== History ==
=== 1980s ===
The idea of a pay-TV network in South Africa came to life as early as 1982, when Nasionale Pers (Naspers) – headed by executive Koos Bekker — started to promote the idea to the country's other three largest media corporations: Times Media Ltd (now Avusa/BDFM), Argus (now the Independent Group) and Perskor (which is now defunct).

The initial project by Ton Vosloo in 1982 suggested that the new channel would restore the revenue of its newspapers.

The newspapers and magazines published by Naspers had lost a lot of advertising revenue to the SABC after the arrival of television and for this reason, according to some sources, the National Party government wanted Naspers to run its own television network.

Initially, the plan was for M-Net to be jointly owned by the four media corporations, with the Natal Witness also having a small share in the station. However, as time went on, the project became that of Naspers only.

On 27 November 1984, Foreign Affairs minister Pik Botha suggested the creation of a feasibility study for the subscription network, assisted by a working group. On 25 April 1985, the press consortium won the bid, over 39 other applicants. Naspers would hold 26%, the three other groups 23% each and the two independent newspapers 5% each. The new service would have a set of guidelines: no news or political coverage, no exclusive sports screenings, no more than nine hours on air per day and no advertising. The format would emulate that of SABC's TV4, which ran on its black networks (TV2 and TV3) from 9pm to closedown.

In October 1986, they started broadcasting for 12 hours a day – initially to Johannesburg and Pretoria, to about 500 households who had bought decoders. Their aim at that stage was to sell 9,000 decoders per month. The service used the Oak Orion scrambling system, and the decoders were manufactured in South Africa by the local affiliate of Matsushita Electric. That small start finally broke the TV monopoly by SABC.

Although it was subscription-based, the Broadcasting Authority granted them a one-hour time slot each day, in which the channel could broadcast unencrypted, free-to-air content, in order to promote itself and attract potential subscribers. In 1987, the Cabinet also approved an arrangement under which the SABC was required to make its TV4 channel available to M-Net between 6 and 7pm. This time slot became known as Open Time; though it was only meant to be temporary — M-Net was supposed to close Open Time immediately when it had 150,000 subscribers – it remained.

At the end of its first year, they recorded a loss of R37 million. However, it pushed forward and eventually, the public started taking notice. After two years, the loss was turned into a R20 million profit. In 1988, the channel launched Carte Blanche, a multi-award-winning actuality program hosted by Derek Watts and Ruda Landman. In only a few years, Carte Blanche became famous for its investigative journalism. In the process, the show also uncovered many of South Africa's most famous scandals of human rights abuse, corruption and consumer affairs.

1989 saw the launch of M-Net SuperSport, which went on to become South Africa's (and Sub-Saharan Africa's) first dedicated sports channel which spawned into sports-specific channels from 2003 onward. It was the year they adopted a new slogan – We Won't Stop the Magic, backed by a massive ad campaign.

=== 1990s ===
1990 was the first year that they made a profit and also the year that saw a few major changes for the channel. It launched K-TV, a daily time slot specialising in kids' entertainment, and in July 1991 Open Time was expanded from the initial one hour per day, to two. They applied for a licence to broadcast news and the application was granted in December 1990. (Former State President P.W. Botha once claimed that "M-Net would not broadcast news as long as he was State President.") but during June 1991, they announced that they were putting their plans for news broadcasts aside and that, instead, more money would be invested in local productions, including South Africa's first local soap opera Egoli, which started on 6 April 1992 and ended on 31 March 2010. However, they began re-broadcasting BBC World Service Television (now BBC World News) that same year. In addition to news, the channel started airing sporting events, per a January 1991 amendment.

In early 1994, M-Net started broadcasting to Nigeria in Lagos. By 1995, the channel was also being carried in Uganda over VHF, Namibia over VHF and Lesotho using Lesotho Television's network.

M-Net SuperSport changed its name in 1994 to SuperSport only, to create a more recognizable brand. During that year it broadcast live coverage of South Africa's test cricket series in Australia for the first time. At the same time, Hugh Bladen and Naas Botha – two of the channel's most colourful rugby commentators — joined SuperSport. By that time, its sports coverage became very impressive, including the US Masters, the FA Cup Finals, the Indy 500, the US PGA Championship, Wimbledon, the Tour de France, MotoGP and an ever-expanding rugby package. In 1995, SuperSport started broadcasting 24 hours per day on M-Net's spare channel, the Community Service Network, which paved the way for a 24-hour multi-channel sports network. When rugby became a full professional sport in 1995, most of the broadcasting rights in the Southern Hemisphere were sold to Rupert Murdoch's News Corporation. In response, they started negotiating with NewsCorp in August 1995 and in February the following year, SuperSport was granted sole broadcasting rights to both the Super 12 and Tri Nations rugby tournaments. It was a major breakthrough for the channel as well as SuperSport, which had by then expanded to sports-and-leagues-specific TV channels on DStv and GOtv, MultiChoice's satellite TV services.

As of 1999, M-Net was one of the three television networks in the world to have agreements with every major American film studio, having signed a contract with Warner Bros., in an exclusive deal that was snatched from upstart terrestrial broadcaster e.tv. Its content would appear on its channels effective 1 April 1999. On 1 November that year, M-Net expanded its Open Time slot to other African countries where the channel was relayed on terrestrial television.

=== 2000s ===
The channel rebranded again on 11 February 2001 with the new tagline "We Call it Magic". The new logo incorporated the iconic M symbol inside a square, representing the values of M-Net as a "brave, colourful and exciting channel", while also accommodating it with its sub-brands, and strengthening its ties with the wider network of M-Net sister channels. In addition, M-Net had secured the rights to the American reality show Temptation Island, shot in Belize. The network also secured the rights to the smash hit reality format Big Brother, with the aim of producing a localised version for South Africa. The first season alone was set to be the biggest production to date, with a record-breaking number of 120 jobs, the equivalent of three separate productions, created in its making. M-Net had plans to continue its growth strategy in 2002. Following on from the success of Big Brother, the channel secured the rights to another groundbreaking international format, Idols, which premiered on 10 March 2002.

ICASA ruled in favour of the withdrawal of Open Time on its terrestrial feed on 1 June 2005, seeing it as unfair for a subscription-based network. The new rule was put into effect from 1 April 2007. Ahead of closing, some 550,000 South Africans regularly watched the slot, which consisted largely of local productions. To deal with its loss of revenue, projected to be at R60 million, M-Net unveiled a one-hour block of its original soaps (among them Egoli) from April 2007.

=== 2010s ===
A new line-up was introduced on 1 April 2011, which implied the end of Afrikaans and sports programming on the satellite feed of the channel, as well as the removal of KTV from both terrestrial and satellite feeds. KTV was removed because the target audience migrated to DSTV's dedicated kids channels, while the sports and Afrikaans programming continued on the terrestrial feed because its subscribers did not have sports and language-specific channels. With these changes, the satellite feed would only air English-language entertainment programming all day. On 21 February 2018, Multichoice announced the shutdown of the terrestrial feed with the switch-off of its analogue subscription network, with the migration completing on 31 March. After the shutdown date, its legacy analogue subscribers went to either DStv (in areas without DTT signal) or GOtv.

=== High definition ===
Delivery of high-definition content started with the launch of DStv's first high definition decoder the HD PVR, XtraView and the first HD channel, M-Net HD. M-Net began broadcasting a 720p high definition channel in 2010, which is available for HD-PVR subscribers; the standard definition channel for non-HD-PVR subscribers is merely downscaled at the provider from the HD feed rather than having a devoted analog channel. In 2012, the original film/movie channels were expanded to 6 channels which grouped films according to genre/preference.

== M-Net channels ==
=== M-Net ===
The original M-Net channel broadcasts general entertainment, as well as premiere movies, documentaries, music specials and first-run TV series. The channel has a timeshift service, a terrestrial service and a CSN in South Africa. In other African countries the channel broadcasts exclusively on the DStv Service with two different feeds, M-Net East for East Africa and M-Net West for West Africa. These feeds broadcasts nearly the same content, though the West African feed is 2 hours ahead of the East African feed as programmes are scheduled based on the local time zones of the regions (EAT and WAT respectively) except for some live programmes. Advertising on the East feed is targeted at Kenyan viewers while the West feed is targeted at Nigerian Viewers. Over the course of several years, M-Net has launched numerous sister channels. In DStv, the channel is only available to the high tier package Premium (or Ultimate) as it contains expensive content.

M-Net Edge

On 31 March 2017, M-Net Edge programs were moved to M-Net as part of a merge and various other channels from M-Net.

M-Net +1

The time shift channel, M-Net +1 was launched also for DStv Premium customers since 1 June 2016 on DStv channel 901. However, the time-shifted channel was discontinued on 16 May 2021 due to increase of content preference by DStv Premium Subscribers on the DStv app.

=== M-Net Movies ===
The original two movie channels, Movie Magic 1 and Movie Magic 2, launched in 1995 to coincide with the launch of DStv, were renamed M-Net Movies 1 and M-Net Movies 2, respectively, in 2005. Two additional movie channels, M-Net Movies Stars (previously M-Net Stars which launched in 2009) and actionX (which was renamed M-Net Action in 2008), were later launched. In October 2012, the channels were expanded to six which grouped films according to genre and preference. The 7 film/movie channels were later reconsolidated into 4 numeric channels.

In August 2026, it was announced that M-Net Movies 1 would be merged with M-Net Movies 2 to become M Movies+, M-Net Movies 3 becomes M Movies Stars and M-Net Movies 4 becomes M Movies Legends.

=== 1Magic and Me ===
Most of the programmes broadcast are unique to M-Net Series but some are rebroadcasts of episodes previously shown on M-Net.

A single series channel known as The Series Channel (renamed as M-Net Series in 2005) was introduced in April 1998 as a sister channel to the original M-Net channel. On 9 July 2013, this channel was split into three, namely:

- M-Net Series Showcase, which was broadcast in high definition, previously served as the primary series channel on which most new content unique to Series was broadcast.
- M-Net Series Reality broadcast talk shows and other reality media.
- M-Net Series Zone which served as a catch-up channel, and featured previous seasons of shows. Several TV shows also ran back-to-back in marathon blocks.

On 11 September 2014, it was announced that Showcase and Reality would be discontinued and replaced with two new channels, VUZU Amp and M-Net Edge, on 20 and 13 October, respectively. Only one channel of the original three, M-Net Series Zone, remained. The standalone channel is reminiscent of the initial channel, in that it airs shows that previously aired on the main M-Net channel. It was rebranded M-Net City in 2015. On 29 January 2018, VUZU Amp was rebranded as 1Magic.

M-Net City, along with VUZU, was closed on 29 October 2021 to be replaced by ME on its EPG slot. Both channels went dark on the platform by 2 February 2024.

=== kykNET ===
kykNET, which broadcasts solely in Afrikaans, was launched in October 1999. The channel features general entertainment, series, informative programs and music. kykNET also has two sister channels, kykNET & Kie and kykNET Musiek (now known as kykNET Nou!). DStv announced on 16 July 2014 that kykNET would be broadcast in high definition as of 12 August 2014.

It was launched in the UK on TalkTalk's IPTV service, TalkTalk Plus TV, in October 2013. However, it was dropped by TalkTalk in December 2015. A kykNET International service was available online to subscribers in selected countries in North America, Europe and Australasia via the Showmax platform.

=== VUZU ===
VUZU, originally launched as Go in 2003, had a strong focus on Southern African youth, specifically preteens, teens and the 20–49 demographics, similar to some popular American television channels such as Bravo, FX, BET, The CW, NBC, TNT and many others. A sister channel, VUZU Amp, was launched in October 2014, which was later relaunched as 1Magic.

The channel was shut down, along with M-Net City, on 29 October 2021 to be replaced by Me.

=== Mzansi Magic ===
Mzansi Magic features original South African series, movies, music, documentaries and reality shows. It has two sister channels, Mzansi Magic Music, Mzansi Wethu and Mzansi Biskop.

=== Africa Magic ===
Africa Magic, which started off as a single channel of the same name, is a brand owned by M-Net and MultiChoice and now comprises 7 channels. The first Africa Magic channel was launched in July 2003 as a movie channel and over the next decade, the brand expanded to include 6 more channels comprising movies, television shows and general entertainment. Africa Magic currently broadcasts in more than 50 African countries. The channels include Africa Magic+, Africa Magic Showcase, Africa Magic Yoruba, Africa Magic Igbo, Africa Magic Hausa and Africa Magic Epic. Africa Magic is also responsible for the annual Africa Magic Viewers' Choice Awards (AMVCAs), the biggest celebration of film and television talent in Africa.

=== Maisha Magic ===
Maisha Magic comprises four channels, Maisha Magic Loko & Maisha Magic Plus for Kenyan audiences and Maisha Magic Bongo & Maisha Magic Poa for Tanzanian audiences. They focus on East African movies, series and music. It was initially launched as Africa Magic Swahili but was later rebranded as Maisha Magic before it became Maisha Magic Swahili. The channel was rebranded again as Maisha Magic East, and now known as Maisha Magic Loko. Maisha Magic Bongo have been working with many producers from Tanzania like Mtitu Game 1st Quality, Steps Entertainment, Halisi Film, Joh Films, Severini Film Entertainment, 360 Production etc.

In 2021, the brand introduced Maisha Magic Movies showcasing the best Ugandan, Kenyan and Tanzanian movies. The channel later got shut down in August 2023.

=== Channel O ===
Channel O is a present music channel with a strong focus on urban music genres. It also holds the annual Channel O Music Video Awards ceremony where artists are awarded for their outstanding contribution to music.

=== SuperSport ===
SuperSport is a group of sport television channels carried on DStv and GOtv. It provides sports content in South Africa and many other African countries.

=== Magic Showcase and Cine Magic ===
In November 2020, Novela Magic was launched which celebrates unique African Storytelling and showcases local content and African stories made by African talent by bringing together a rage of content from across the region on one platform.

Two years later, it was announced that the channel would be replaced by Magic Showcase and Cine Magic both tailor made for low tiered bouquets.

In June 2026, it was announced that the channels would be shutting down at the end of the month. This was done to ensure its services continue to meet customers' evolving viewing preferences.

All HD channels are aired in 1080i but are downscaled to SD if the subscriber isn't in possession of an HD or Explora decoder.

== Present programming ==
=== Domestic ===
==== Game shows ====
- Survivor South Africa

==== General entertainment ====
- Helderberg
- My Kitchen Rules: South Africa
- The Bachelor SA
- The Bachelorette SA
- Big Brother Mzansi

==== News and current affairs ====
- Carte Blanche

==== Dramas ====
- Invisible
- Recipes for Love and Murder
- Reyka
- Tracers

=== Global ===
==== Comedy ====
- Georgie & Mandy's First Marriage
- Ghosts
- Hacks
- Happy's Place
- St. Denis Medical
- The Paper
- The Miniature Wife

==== Dramas ====
- Amadeus
- All American
- Allegiance
- Boston Blue
- Chicago Fire
- Chicago Med
- Chicago P.D.
- CIA
- Cupertino
- Devil in Disguise: John Wayne Gacy
- Dutton Ranch
- Euphoria
- Fire Country
- FBI
- Hit Point
- Landman
- Law & Order
- Power Book IV: Force
- NCIS
- MobLand
- The Gilded Age
- The Hunting Party
- The White Lotus
- This City Is Ours
- Sheriff Country
- S.W.A.T. Exiles
- Watson

==== Reality/unscripted ====
- 100 Foot Wave
- Death of a Showjumper
- Project Runway
- Last Week Tonight with John Oliver
- The Real Housewives of Orange County
- The Real Housewives of New York City
- The Masked Singer
- Survivor
- Surviving Earth

==== Award shows ====
- Emmy Awards
- Grammy Awards
- Golden Globe Awards

== Past programming ==
=== Domestic ===
==== Soap operas ====
- Binnelanders
- Egoli: Place of Gold

==== Dramas ====
- Desert Rose
- Gomora
- Lioness
- Inconceivable
- Is'Thunzi
- Legacy
- Strangers You Know
- Summertide

==== Game shows ====
- Deal or No Deal
- Who Wants to Be a Millionaire?
- You Bet Your Life

==== General entertainment ====
- Love Island South Africa
- MasterChef South Africa

==== Music ====
- Idols South Africa

=== Global ===
==== Soap operas ====
- Loving

==== Comedy ====
- And Just Like That...
- Avenue 5
- B Positive
- Boston Legal
- Broke
- Buffy the Vampire Slayer
- Call Me Kat
- Chuck
- Desperate Housewives
- Diagnosis: Murder
- Gilmore Girls
- Glee
- iZombie
- Jane the Virgin
- Rescue Me
- Man with a Plan
- Mom
- Sex and the City
- Shameless
- Sweet Valley High
- Terriers
- The Conners
- The Goldbergs
- The Unicorn
- The Wonder Years
- Ugly Betty
- United States of Al
- United We Fall
- V.I.P.
- Why Women Kill
- Young Sheldon

==== Dramas ====
- 9-1-1
- 9-1-1: Lone Star
- 24
- A Million Little Things
- Alcatraz
- American Gods
- American Horror Story
- Angel
- Anne of Green Gables: The Sequel
- Are You Smarter than a 5th Grader?
- Babylon Berlin
- Bad Girls
- Baywatch
- Beauty & the Beast
- Beauty and the Beast (1987)
- Believe
- Beverly Hills 90210
- Body of Proof
- Billions
- Blue Bloods
- Brand New Life
- Charmed
- China Beach
- City of Angels
- Cracker
- Crime Story
- Cross of Fire
- Clarice
- CSI: Vegas
- CSI: Crime Scene Investigation
- CSI: Cyber
- CSI: Miami
- CSI: NY
- Damages
- Darlings of the Gods
- Dexter: New Blood
- Dirt
- ER
- Everwood
- FBI: International
- FBI: Most Wanted
- Firefly
- First Wave
- Foyle's War
- Game of Thrones
- Grey's Anatomy
- Hart to Hart
- High Mountain Rangers
- Homefront
- House of the Dragon
- In the Dark
- In Treatment
- Inspector Rex
- Justified
- Katy Keene
- Land's End
- La Brea
- Law & Order: Organized Crime
- Lie to Me
- Lights Out (2011)
- Madam Secretary
- Mare of Easttown
- Midnight Caller
- Moonlighting
- Nancy Drew
- NCIS: Hawai'i
- NCIS: Los Angeles
- NCIS: New Orleans
- New Amsterdam
- Nip/Tuck
- NYPD Blue
- Ohara
- Ordinary Joe
- Over There
- Prodigal Son
- P.S. I Luv U
- Pensacola: Wings of Gold
- Prison Break
- Private Practice
- Ragdoll
- Reign
- Riverdale
- Roots: The Next Generations
- Rush
- SEAL Team
- Silent Witness
- Sons of Anarchy
- Spearfield's Daughter
- Station 19
- Stingers
- Sweet Justice
- Teen Wolf
- The 100
- The Adventurer
- The Bill
- The Campbells
- The Cloning of Joanna May
- The Commish
- The Darling Buds of May
- The Flight Attendant
- The Good Doctor
- The Good Fight
- The Hardy Boys
- The Hitchhiker
- The Offer
- The Littlest Victims
- The Messengers
- The Net
- The New Adventures of Robin Hood
- The Nightmare Years
- The Originals
- The Riches
- The River Kings
- The Secret Life of Us
- The Shield
- The Swiss Family Robinson (1975)
- The Thanksgiving Promise
- The Vampire Diaries
- The Wire
- The Republic of Sarah
- The Time Traveler's Wife
- The Twilight Zone
- This Is Us
- Thief
- True Blood
- Veronica Mars
- War of the Worlds
- Water Rats
- WIOU
- Walker
- Westworld
- Yellowjackets
- You and Me and Uncle Bob

==== Sitcoms ====
- 3rd Rock from the Sun
- 'Allo 'Allo!
- Almost Home
- Amen
- Anything but Love
- Arrested Development
- Bagdad Cafe
- Blossom
- Boy Meets World
- Charles in Charge
- Clueless
- Coach
- Cosby
- Cybill
- Dave's World
- Dear John (USA)
- Dharma & Greg
- Designing Women
- Dinosaurs
- Dream On
- Drexell's Class
- Duet
- Empty Nest
- Father Ted
- Friends
- Full House (1987)
- Gimme Gimme Gimme
- Good Advice
- Grace Under Fire
- Grounded for Life
- Hangin' with Mr. Cooper
- Hearts Afire
- Herman's Head
- Home Improvement
- Honey, I Shrunk the Kids: The TV Show
- It's Always Sunny in Philadelphia
- Kristin
- Legit
- Life with Bonnie
- Lucky
- Major Dad
- Malcolm in the Middle
- Malibu, CA
- Married... with Children
- My Name Is Earl
- Mr. Bean
- Newhart
- Nurses
- Oh Baby
- Only Fools and Horses
- Open House
- Parks and Recreation
- Perfect Strangers
- Phenom
- Raising Hope
- Son of the Beach
- Starved
- Spin City
- Still Standing
- Step by Step
- Suddenly Susan
- Testees
- That '70s Show
- The Bernie Mac Show
- The Brittas Empire
- The Fresh Prince of Bel-Air
- The Good Life (1994)
- The Hogan Family
- The Jeffersons
- The League
- The Millers
- The Mommies
- The Torkelsons
- The Upper Hand
- Three's Company
- Titus
- Too Close for Comfort
- Two of a Kind
- United States of Tara
- Veronica's Closet
- Where I Live
- Wilfred
- Wings
- Woops!
- Yes, Dear
- Yes Minister
- Zoe, Duncan, Jack and Jane

==== Cooking ====
- Floyd on Fish

==== Television films ====
- Clarence
- Fatal Deception: Mrs. Lee Harvey Oswald
- In the Arms of a Killer
- In the Gloaming
- In the Line of Duty: The F.B.I. Murders
- Stop at Nothing
- Stormy Weathers
- Sudie and Simpson
- To Catch a Killer
- Tonya and Nancy: The Inside Story

==== Documentaries ====
- 48 Hours
- Big Cat Diary
- Night Walk
- Supersense
- The Civil War
- Wildlife on One

==== Sci-fi ====
- Amazing Stories
- First Wave
- Roswell

==== Anthology ====
- Carol & Company
- Ghost Story
- The Twilight Zone

==== Reality ====
- America's Funniest People
- America's Next Top Model
- Boy Band
- Cedric's Barber Battle
- Celebrity Family Feud
- Ellen's Game of Games
- Extreme Makeover
- Fame, Fortune and Romance
- Mental Samurai
- Lifestyles of the Rich and Famous
- Little Big Shots
- Love Island
- The Kelly Clarkson Show
- The Late Late Show with James Corden
- The Jamie Kennedy Experiment
- Whose Line Is It Anyway?

==== Animation ====
- 2DTV
- Futurama
- God, the Devil and Bob
- Meet the Raisins!
- South Park
- The Simpsons
- Wallace and Gromit

==== Lifestyle ====
- Lifestyles of the Rich and Famous

==== Children's ====
- 100 Deeds for Eddie McDowd
- A Bunch of Munsch
- A Miss Mallard Mystery
- A Pup Named Scooby-Doo
- A.J.'s Time Travelers
- Aaahh!!! Real Monsters
- ABC Afterschool Special
- ABC Weekend Special
- Ace Lightning
- Ace Ventura: Pet Detective
- Action Man (1995)
- Action Man (2000)
- ALF: The Animated Series
- AlfTales
- Alien
- All Grown Up!
- All That
- Alvin and the Chipmunks
- Amazing Animals
- Anatole
- Angela Anaconda
- Angelina Ballerina
- Animal Mechanicals
- Animaniacs
- Anne of Green Gables: The Animated Series
- Aquila
- Astro Boy (2003)
- Avatar: The Last Airbender
- Babar
- Babar and the Adventures of Badou
- Back at the Barnyard
- Bad Dog
- Bakugan Battle Brawlers
- Bamboo Bears
- Bananas in Pyjamas
- The Barbie Movies
- Barbie and the Rockers Specials
- Barney & Friends
- Batman Beyond
- Batman: The Animated Series
- Battletoads
- Beakman's World
- Beast Wars: Transformers
- Beetle Bailey
- Being Ian
- Ben & Izzy
- Betty's Bunch
- Beverly Hills Teens
- Beyblade
- Big & Small
- Big Bad Beetleborgs
- Bill Nye, the Science Guy
- Billy the Cat
- Birdz
- Blaster's Universe
- Blazing Dragons
- Bo on the Go
- Bob the Builder
- Bobby's World
- Braceface
- Breaker High
- Budgie the Little Helicopter
- Bugs Bunny
- Bump in the Night
- Bumpety Boo
- Bushfire Moon
- Caitlin's Way
- Camp Candy
- Captain N: The Game Master
- The Adventures of Captain Pugwash
- Captain Simian & the Space Monkeys
- Captain Zed and the Zee Zone
- Caribou Kitchen
- Carl Squared
- Casper and Friends
- CatDog
- CBS Schoolbreak Special
- CBS Storybreak
- Cédric
- ChalkZone
- Channel Umptee-3
- Chip 'n Dale: Rescue Rangers
- Christopher Crocodile
- Chuck Finn
- Chuggington
- City of Friends
- Clang Invasion
- Class of the Titans
- Clifford the Big Red Dog
- Conan the Adventurer
- Connie the Cow
- Count Duckula
- Cousin Skeeter
- Cow and Chicken
- Crash Zone
- Creepschool
- Creepy Crawlers
- Crocadoo
- Cubeez
- Cubix
- Danny Phantom
- Darkwing Duck
- Delilah & Julius
- Dennis the Menace
- Dex Hamilton: Alien Entomologist
- Dexter's Laboratory
- Diabolik
- Digimon
- Dinky Di's
- Dino-Riders
- Dinosaucers
- DinoSquad
- Dinozaurs
- Diplodos
- Disney's Adventures of the Gummi Bears
- Doctor Snuggles
- Dog City
- Dog House
- Donkey Kong Country
- Don't Eat the Neighbours
- Dot
- Double Dragon
- Doug
- Dr Otter
- Dragon Booster
- DragonFlyz
- Drake & Josh
- Dream Street
- Dreamkix
- DuckTales (1987)
- DuckTales (2017)
- Dumb Bunnies
- Dumbo's Circus
- Dungeons & Dragons
- Edgar and Ellen
- Eekstravaganza
- Eerie, Indiana: The Other Dimension
- Emoji
- Erky Perky
- Escape of the Artful Dodger
- Eugénie Sandler P.I.
- Even Stevens
- Extreme Dinosaurs
- Extreme Ghostbusters
- Fantastic Four
- Fantastic Max
- Fantomcat
- Farmkids
- Fetch the Vet
- Fifi and the Flowertots
- Figure It Out
- Flight 29 Down
- Flight Squad
- Flipper & Lopaka
- Flying Rhino Junior High
- Fox's Peter Pan and the Pirates
- Fraggle Rock
- Frankenstein's Cat
- Franklin
- Franny's Feet
- Freakazoid!
- Funky Valley
- F-Zero
- G.I. Joe Extreme
- G.I. Joe: A Real American Hero
- G2G
- Gadget Boy & Heather
- Garfield and Friends
- Garfield television specials
- Gargoyles
- Gaspard and Lisa
- Genie in the House
- George and Martha
- George Shrinks
- Goof Troop
- Goosebumps
- Gordon the Garden Gnome
- Grossology
- Groundling Marsh
- Guess with Jess
- Gullah Gullah Island
- Gypsy Girl
- Hairy Scary
- Hallo Spencer
- Hammerman
- Happily Ever After: Fairy Tales for Every Child
- Happy Ness: Secret of the Loch
- Harveytoons
- Heathcliff and the Catillac Cats
- Henry's Cat
- Hey Arnold!
- Hi-5
- Hills End
- Hilltop Hospital
- Hollywood 7
- Homestar Runner
- Horrid Henry
- Horseland
- Hulk Hogan's Rock 'n' Wrestling
- Huntik: Secrets & Seekers
- My Best Friend is an Alien
- Inspector Gadget
- Inspector Gadget's Field Trip
- In The Night Garden…
- Inuk
- Invader Zim
- Iron Man
- Jack Hanna's Animal Adventures
- Jackie Chan Adventures
- Jakers! The Adventures of Piggley Winks
- James Bond Jr.
- Jane and the Dragon
- Jay Jay the Jet Plane
- Jim Henson's The Hoobs
- Jimbo and the Jet-Set
- Johnny Bravo
- Johnson and Friends
- Jonny Quest
- Journey to the Heart of the World
- Journey to the West – Legends of the Monkey King
- Jumanji
- Just Jordan
- KaBlam!
- Katie and Orbie
- Kenan & Kel
- Kerching!
- Kerwhizz
- Ketchup: Cats Who Cook
- Kid vs. Kat
- Kidsongs
- Kikoriki
- King Arthur
- Kipper
- Kong: The Animated Series
- L.A. 7
- Lapitch the Little Shoemaker
- LazyTown
- Legend of the Dragon
- Legends of the Hidden Temple
- Liberty's Kids
- Life with Louie
- Lifeboat Luke
- Looney Tunes Movies
- Little Bear
- Little Grey Rabbit
- Little Monsters
- Little Princess
- Little Red Tractor
- Little Rosey
- Little Shop
- Little Wizards
- Lizzie McGuire
- Looney Tunes
- Lunar Jim
- M.A.S.K.
- Madeline
- Maggie and the Ferocious Beast
- Magilla Gorilla
- Maisy
- Make Way for Noddy
- Marsupilami
- Martha Speaks
- Marvin the Tap-Dancing Horse
- Mary-Kate and Ashley in Action!
- Maxie's World
- Maya the Bee
- McGee and Me!
- Meg and Mog
- Men in Black: The Series
- Metajets
- Mew Mew Power
- Mighty Morphin Power Rangers
- Mona the Vampire
- Monchhichis
- Monster Allergy
- Monster by Mistake
- Monster Farm
- Monster Ranchers
- Mortal Kombat: Defenders of the Realm
- Mother Goose and Grimm
- Motorcity
- Mousercise
- Mr. Bogus
- Mr. Meaty
- Mummies Alive!
- Mummy Nanny
- Muppet Babies
- My Friend Rabbit
- My Goldfish Is Evil!
- My Little Pony
- My Little Pony Tales
- Mythic Warriors: Guardians of the Legend
- Nanook's Great Hunt
- Naturally, Sadie
- Ned's Declassified School Survival Guidemi
- Nelvana Specials
- New Captain Scarlet
- New Kids on the Block
- Noah's Island
- Noddy in Toyland
- Noozles
- Ōban Star-Racers
- Octonauts
- Old Bear Stories
- Oscar and Friends
- Outriders
- OWL/TV
- Paddington Bear Specials
- Paddington Bear
- Pat & Stan
- Peanuts Specials
- Peanuts
- Pearlie
- Pelswick
- Pigeon Street
- Piggsburg Pigs!
- Pinky and the Brain
- Pippi Longstocking
- Pirates of Dark Water
- Pixel Pinkie
- Pocket Dragon Adventures
- Poddington Peas
- Pokémon
- Poko
- Pole Position
- Poochini
- Poppets Town
- PopPixie
- Pororo The Little Penguin
- Postman Pat Special Delivery Service
- Postman Pat
- Potamus Park
- Potterton Films
- Pound Puppies
- Power Rangers: Dino Thunder
- Power Rangers: Ninja Storm
- Preston Pig
- Princess Gwenevere and the Jewel Riders
- Princess Sissi
- Princess Tenko
- Project G.e.e.K.e.R.
- ProStars
- Pucca
- Pugwall
- Pugwall's Summer
- Rambo: The Force of Freedom
- Raw Toonage
- Ready or Not
- Redwall
- Renford Rejects
- Rescue Heroes
- Rimba's Island
- Ring Raiders
- Ripley's Believe It or Not
- Road Rovers
- Road to Avonlea
- Roary the Racing Car
- RoboCop: The Animated Series
- Rock 'n Cop
- Rocket Power
- Rocko's Modern Life
- Rocky and the Dodos
- Rolie Polie Olie
- RollBots
- Roswell Conspiracies: Aliens, Myths and Legends
- Ruby Gloom
- Rude Dog and the Dweebs
- Rugrats
- Rupert
- Saban's Adventures of Oliver Twist
- Saban's Adventures of the Little Mermaid
- Saban's Gulliver's Travels
- Saber Rider and the Star Sheriffs
- Scaredy Camp
- Scaredy Squirrel
- Science Court
- Scooby-Doo and Scrappy-Doo
- Scooby-Doo, Where Are You!
- Sea Princesses
- Serious Amazon
- Serious Jungle
- Seven Little Monsters
- Shadow Raiders
- Sharky & George
- Sheep in the Big City
- Shelldon
- Sherlock Holmes in the 22nd Century
- SheZow
- Shoebox Zoo
- Silver Surfer
- Sitting Ducks
- Sky Dancers
- Sky Trackers
- Skyland
- Slim Pig
- Slimer! And the Real Ghostbusters
- Sonic Underground
- Sooty
- Spartakus and the Sun Beneath the Sea
- Spectacular Spider-Man
- Speed Racer: The Next Generation
- Spellbinder
- Spider-Man
- Spider-Man Unlimited
- Spiral Zone
- Spliced
- SpongeBob SquarePants
- Sport Billy
- The Adventures of Spot
- Star Trek: The Animated Series
- Star Wars: Droids
- Star Wars: Ewoks
- Starcom: The U.S. Space Force
- Static Shock
- Stickin' Around
- Storybook World
- Strawberry Shortcake
- Street Sharks
- Sunkist Kids
- Super Mario Bros.
- Super Robot Monkey Team Hyperforce Go!
- Superbook
- Superman: The Animated Series
- Supernormal
- Swamp Thing
- Sylvanian Families
- Sylvester and Tweety Mysteries
- TaleSpin
- Taz-Mania
- Teenage Mutant Ninja Turtles (1987)
- Teenage Mutant Ninja Turtles (2003)
- Teletubbies
- The Addams Family (1992)
- The Adventures of Grady Greenspace
- The Adventures of Jimmy Neutron, Boy Genius
- The Adventures of Pete and Pete
- The Adventures of Raggedy Ann and Andy
- The Adventures of Sam & Max: Freelance Police
- The Adventures of Teddy Ruxpin
- The Adventures of the Galaxy Rangers
- The Adventures of Tintin
- The Amanda Show
- The Angry Beavers
- The Animal Shelf
- The Avengers: United They Stand
- The Beeps
- The Berenstain Bears
- The Biz
- The Brothers García
- The California Raisin Show
- Care Bears
- The Charlie Brown and Snoopy Show
- The Chipmunks Go to the Movies
- The Country Mouse and the City Mouse Adventures
- The Dreamstone
- The Elephant Show
- The Fairly OddParents!
- The Fairytaler
- The Famous Five
- The Flintstone Kids
- The Flintstones
- The Flying House
- The Forgotten Toys
- The Further Adventures of SuperTed
- The Future is Wild
- The Genie From Down Under
- The Get Along Gang
- The Haunted School
- The Hydronauts
- The Incredible Hulk (1982)
- The Incredible Hulk (1996)
- The Jetsons
- The Journey of Allen Strange
- The Karate Kid
- The Kids from Room 402
- The Kids of Degrassi Street
- The Lampies
- The Little Flying Bears
- The Little Lulu Show
- The Little Mermaid
- The Magic Box
- The Magic School Bus
- The Magician's House
- The Mask: Animated Series
- The Mickey Mouse Club
- The Mighty Jungle
- The Miraculous Mellops
- The Mouse and the Monster
- The Mouse Factory
- The Mr. Men Show
- The Mummy: The Animated Series
- The Mystery Files of Shelby Woo
- The Mystic Knights of Tir Na NOg
- The Neverending Story
- The New Addams Family
- The New Adventures of Ocean Girl
- The New Adventures of Winnie the Pooh
- The New Adventures of Zorro (1997)
- The New Archies
- The New Scooby-Doo Mysteries
- The New Woody Woodpecker Show
- The Paz Show
- The Pink Panther
- The Pinky and Perky Show
- The Prince of Atlantis
- The Real Ghostbusters
- The Ren & Stimpy Show
- The Rosey and Buddy Show
- The Save-Ums!
- The Secret Files of the Spy Dogs
- The Secret Series
- The Secret World of Benjamin Bear
- The Silver Brumby
- The Smurfs
- The Telebugs
- The Tick
- The Toothbrush Family
- The Transformers
- The Trap Door
- The Wacky World of Tex Avery
- The Wayne Manifesto
- The Wiggles
- The Wild Thornberrys
- The Wizard of Oz
- The World of Peter Rabbit and Friends
- The Wubbulous World of Dr. Seuss
- The Wuzzles
- The Zack Files
- The Zeta Project
- Theodore Tugboat
- Thomas the Tank Engine & Friends
- Thunderbirds
- Tiny Toon Adventures
- Toad Patrol
- Toonsylvania
- Towser
- Toxic Crusaders
- Tracey McBean
- Twinkle, the Dream Being
- Twipsy
- Ultimate Book of Spells
- Underground Ernie
- Unfabulous
- Van Pires
- Video Power
- Voltron: The Third Dimension
- W.I.T.C.H.
- Wake, Rattle and Roll
- Walter Melon
- Watership Down
- Waynehead
- We All Have Tales
- Weird-Ohs
- Westward Ho!
- What About Mimi?
- What-a-Mess
- What's with Andy?
- Where's Wally?: The Animated Series
- Wide-Eye
- Widget the World Watcher
- Wiggly Park
- WildC.A.T.S.
- Wildfire
- Willa's Wild Life
- Wish Kid
- Wishbone
- Wonder Why?
- Worzel Gummidge Down Under
- Wowser
- Wunschpunsch
- Xcalibur
- X-DuckX
- X-Men
- Yakkity Yak
- Yippee, Yappee and Yahooey
- Yvon of the Yukon
- Zak Tales
- Zoboomafoo
- Zoobilee Zoo
- Z-Squad
- Kerwhizz
- Big & Small
- Maya the Bee
- Heidi
- The Adventures of Blinky Bill
- Zigby

==== Talk shows ====
- The Ellen DeGeneres Show
- The Phil Donahue Show

==== Sketch shows ====
- Smack the Pony

==== Western ====
- Lonesome Dove

==== News and current affairs ====
- Eye to Eye with Connie Chung

==== Entertainment ====
- An Audience with Billy Connolly

==== Education ====
- Beyond 2000

==== Awards Shows ====
- Academy Awards

==== Specials ====
- Adele One Night Only
- Friends: The Reunion
- Oprah with Meghan and Harry

== Locally produced programming ==
=== Present ===
Show	Airs on
53 Extra	Africa Magic
Africa's Next Top Model	Africa Magic
Binnelanders	kykNET
Bravo!	kykNET
Carte Blanche	M-Net
Cula Sibone	Mzansi Magic
Dagbreek	kykNET
Date My Family	Mzansi Magic
Doubt	Mzansi Magic
Dream School SA	M-Net
Greed & Desire	Mzansi Magic
Gospel Alive	Mzansi Magic
Igazi	Mzansi Magic
IsiBaya	Mzansi Magic and Mzansi Wethu
Isithembiso	Mzansi Magic
Jara	Africa Magic
JukeBox	kykNET
Ka-Ching	Mzansi Magic
Legacy	M-Net
Lokshin Bioskop	Mzansi Magic
Mashariki Mix	Africa Magic
Our Perfect Wedding	Mzansi Magic
Sifun'ukwazi	Mzansi Magic
StarGist	Africa Magic
The Queen	Mzansi Magic
Tinsel	Africa Magic
V Entertainment	Vuzu
Villa Rosa	kykNET
Zabalaza	Mzansi Magic
Wang Verstana	Mzansi Magic

=== Past ===
Show	Airs on
Egoli	M-Net from 1993 to 2010
The Wild	M-Net from 2011 to 2013

== Awards and live shows ==
- Africa Magic Viewers Choice Awards also known as the AMVCAs.
- Channel O Music Video Awards also known as the CHOMVAs.
- Miss South Africa
- M-Net Literary Awards
- Big Brother Mzansi, the South African version of Big Brother.
- Big Brother Africa, the continental version of Big Brother.
- Big Brother Naija, the Nigerian version of Big Brother.
- Idols South Africa
- Power Couple South Africa
- The Voice South Africa

== See also ==
- DStv
- GOtv
- MultiChoice
- Africa Magic
- SuperSport
