= Vuzu =

South African television channel, 2003–2021

VUZU
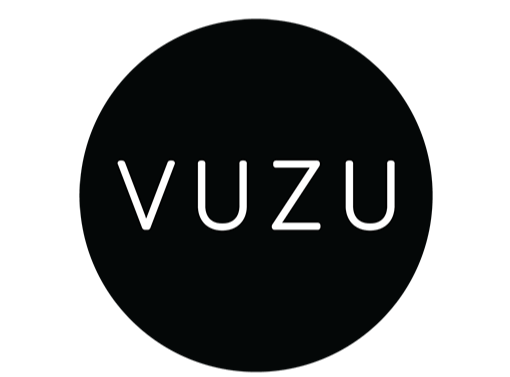
- Country: South Africa
- Broadcast area: Africa
- Network: M-Net
- Headquarters: Johannesburg

Programming
- Language: English
- Picture format: 16:9 SDTV 1080 HD

Ownership
- Owner: Naspers
- Sister channels: Channel O; 1Magic; Mzansi Magic

History
- Launched: 1 August 2003; 23 years ago
- Replaced: Go
- Closed: 29 October 2021; 4 years ago
- Replaced by: Me (channel merger onto M-Net City's space)
- Former names: Go (2003 - 2009)

VUZU was a South African youth-oriented television channel produced by M-Net for sister pay television platform DStv.

== History ==
The channel launched on 1 August 2003 as "go", as a competitor to MTV.

In March 2009, it was announced that the channel would be rebranded as VUZU on 1 July 2009, tying into an attempted social network of the same name. The network also switched its programming schedule and discontinued some shows, to the complaint of some viewers. In 2014, a companion channel, VUZU Amp, replaced M-Net Series, which took its current name of 1Magic on 29 January 2018 with a more localized schedule.

VUZU's schedule changed at the start of September 2018, along with its logo, focusing on more high-profile American sitcoms and dramas, with some local content.

== Closure ==
On 1 October 2021, it was announced that VUZU would close on October 31, 2021. Its programming moved to the channel space of M-Net City, which likewise took on the new name Me. However the network actually closed two days early, at the end of 29 October 2021.

== Logos ==
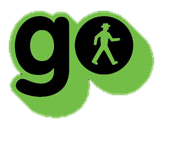
2003–09

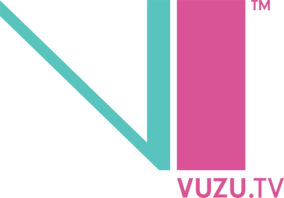
2009–18
