= List of e.tv original programming =

Current e.tv logo since 1 October 2008

e.tv is a South African television channel that has distributed several original television programs, including original series, miniseries, documentaries, and films. e.tv's original productions also include continuations of canceled series from other networks, as well as licensing or co-producing content from international broadcasters for exclusive broadcast in South Africa and other African territories (through the eAfrica feed). As almost all of e.tv's original programming is multilingual, the languages used in the program are also listed (all non-English programming, including segments of unscripted programming where another language is used, is subtitled in English), is organized by its primary genre or format, and is sorted by premiere date. These are productions that have been (or are currently) shown on e.tv, including sister channels eExtra, eReality, eToonz, and eNCA, as well as their streaming service eVOD and the defunct channels eKasi+, eNolly+, Rewind, and e.tv News & Sports.

== Drama ==
Title	Genre	Language(s)	Premiere	Seasons	Runtime	Status
Backstage	Soap Opera	English, IsiZulu, Sesotho	1 May 2000	Unspecified	22–25 minutes	Ended
Jozi Streets	Procedural crime	English	1 November 2004	1 season, 26 episodes	45 minutes	Ended
Scandal!	Tabloid soap opera	English, IsiZulu, IsiXhosa, Sepedi, Xitsonga, South African Sign Language (as of 2021)	5 January 2005	24 seasons, 5000 episodes	22–25 minutes	Ended
Rhythm City	Musical drama, Soap Opera	English, IsiZulu, IsiXhosa, Sesotho, Sepedi	9 July 2007	15 seasons, 3660 episodes	22–25 minutes	Ended
eKasi: Our Stories	Anthology series	Multilingual	5 October 2009	6 seasons, 140 episodes	45–50 minutes	Ended
4Play: Sex Tips For Girls	Drama	English, IsiZulu	2 February 2010	3 seasons, 39 episodes	22–25 minutes	Ended
Mzansi Love	Anthology series	Multilingual	31 July 2012	3 seasons, 27 episodes	45–50 minutes	Ended
Traffic!	Crime thriller	English, IsiXhosa	12 February 2014	2 seasons, 52 episode	22–25 minutes	Ended
Ashes to Ashes	Telenovela	English, IsiXhosa, IsiZulu, Sesotho	2 March 2015	2 seasons, 229 episodes	23–25 minutes	Ended
Umlilo	Drama	English, IsiZulu	2 March 2015	4 seasons, 52 episodes	45–50 minutes	Ended
Z'bondiwe	Crime thriller	IsiXhosa, IsiZulu	12 May 2015	3 seasons, 78 episodes	22–24 minutes	Ended
Matatiele	Romantic fantasy	IsiXhosa, Sesotho	7 April 2015	1 season, 26 episodes	21–24 minutes	Ended
Gold Diggers	Telenovela	English, IsiZulu	10 August 2015	2 seasons, 310 episodes	22–25 minutes	Ended
Hustle	Musical drama	English, IsiZulu, IsiXhosa, Sesotho	11 February 2016	1 season, 26 episodes	45–50 minutes	Ended
Heist	Crime drama	English, IsiZulu, Sepedi	9 February 2016	2 seasons, 26 episodes	22–24 minutes	Ended
The Kingdom - UKhakhayi	Drama series	IsiXhosa	5 April 2016	1 season, 26 episodes	22–25 minutes	Ended
Broken Vows	Telenovela	English, isiZulu	10 April 2017	1 season, 225 episodes	22–25 minutes	Ended
Harvest	Drama	English, IsiZulu	1 May 2017	1 season, 26 episodes	45–50 minutes	Ended
Easy Money	Crime drama	English, IsiZulu	12 September 2017	1 season, 26 episodes	22–25 minutes	Ended
Imbewu: The Seed	Telenovela	English, IsiZulu, IsiXhosa	16 April 2018	5 seasons, 1300 episodes	22–25 minutes	Ended
Durban Gen	Medical telenovela	English, IsiZulu	5 October 2020	2 seasons, 520 episodes	22–25 minutes	Ended
House of Zwide	Fashion telenovela	English, IsiZulu, Setswana	19 July 2021	5 seasons, 1300 episodes	22–25 minutes	Ended
Is'phindiselo	Crime thriller	English, IsiZulu, Sepedi	5 August 2021	2 seasons, 26 episodes	46 minutes	Ended
Housewives	Crime thriller	English, IsiXhosa, IsiZulu, Afrikaans, Sesotho	21 October 2021	2 season, 26 episodes	45 minutes	Ended
The Black Door	Adult sexual telenovela	English, isiZulu, Xhosa, Swati	11 April 2022	1 season, 275 episodes	22 minutes	Ended
UMbali	Crime drama	English, isiZulu, SeSotho	21 July 2022	2 seasons, 26 episodes	22 minutes	Ended
Splintered Pieces	Drama series	English, Setswana	20 October 2022	2 seasons, 52 episodes	22 minutes	Ended
Nikiwe	Telenovela	English, isiZulu	17 April 2023	1 season, 205 episodes	22 minutes	Cancelled
Smoke & Mirrors	Telenovela	English, isiZulu, IsiXhosa, SeSotho	17 April 2023	3 seasons, 780 episodes	22 minutes	Ended
Isitha: The Enemy	Telenovela	English, IsiZulu, Siswati, IsiXhosa	22 May 2023	2 season, 505 episodes	24 minutes	Currently airing
Stout	Teen drama	English, IsiXhosa, IsiZulu, Afrikaans	18 July 2023	1 season, 13 episodes	24 minutes	Ended
Mother of All	Crime drama	English, IsiXhosa, IsiZulu	17 October 2023	2 seasons, 26 episodes	45 minutes	Ended
Isiphetho - Destiny	Telenovela	English, IsiZulu	8 April 2024	1 seasons, 260 episodes	24 minutes	Ended
Kelders van Geheime	Telenovela	Afrikaans	6 May 2024	2 season, 560 episodes	24 minutes	Ended
The Phoenix	Drama	English, Isixhosa	16 July 2024	2 seasons, 26 episodes	24 minutes	Ended
Emzini	Telenovela	English, isiZulu, isiXhosa, Sesotho	13 April 2026	1 season, 260 episodes	24 minutes	Currently Airing
The 4 of Us	Telenovela	English, isiZulu,Sepedi ,Xhosa	29 June 2026	1 season, 260 Episodes	22-24 minutes	Currently Airing
EGagasini:Waves of Sounds	Telenovela	English, isiZulu	29 June 2026	1 season, 260 Episodes	22-24 minutes	Currently Airing

== Comedy ==
Program Title	Genre	Premiere	Seasons	Runtime	Status
Big Okes	Sitcom	2000	1 season 30 episodes	22 minutes	Ended
Madam & Eve	Comedy	5 February 2001	4 seasons, 104 episodes	22 minutes	Ended
Vat n' Sit: Shacking Up	Sitcom	16 April 2014	2 seasons, 39 episodes	22 minutes	Ended
Songololo	Sitcom	15 October 2014	1 season, 26 episodes	22–24 minutes	Ended
B&B	Sitcom	29 June 2015	1 season, 26 episodes	22 minutes	Ended
uSkroef noSexy	Comedy-drama	6 November 2015	1 season, 26 episodes	22 minutes	Ended
Ouma Sarie	Sitcom	11 June 2023	5 seasons, 65 episodes	22 minutes	pending
Die Fakulteit	high school sitcom	14 April 2024	2 seasons, 26 episodes	22 minutes	pending

== Animation ==
=== Kids and Family ===
Title	Genre	Premiere	Seasons	Runtime	Status
Cool Catz	Educational	2006			Ended
Jozi Zoo	Animated series	2003	1 season	5 minutes	Ended
Siyabonga Gogo	Educational				Ended

== Unscripted ==
=== Reality ===
Title	Genre	Premiere	Seasons	Runtime	Status
Forgive & Forget	Conflict resolution	9 January 2007	6 seasons 100 episodes	22 minutes	Ended
The Biggest Loser South Africa	Game Show	7 January 2008	1 season, 15 episodes	45 minutes	Ended
Rolling With...	Celebrity reality series	25 September 2011	5 seasons, 65 episodes	22 minutes	Ended
Reality Check	Celebrity reality competition	6 July 2013	3 seasons, 39 episodes	22 minutes	Ended
You Deserve It	Advertiser-funded game show	22 September 2013	2 seasons, 23 episodes	45 minutes	Ended
Turn Up and Dance	Dance competition	8 September 2015	1 season, 30 episodes	22 minutes	Ended
MVP Jam	Music quiz game show	4 November 2015	1 season, 22 episodes	22 minutes	Ended
So You Think You Can Spin	Driftng competition	7 October 2016	1 season, 13 episodes	22 minutes	Ended
Last Fighter Standing	martial arts competition	15 October 2016	1 season, 12 episodes	22 minutes	Ended
Flava Queens	Advertiser-funded cooking competition	19 May 2017	1 season, 6 episodes	22 minutes	Ended
Family Feud South Africa	Game Show	5 April 2020	2 seasons	1 hr	ongoing
Deadbeat	Reality	10 July 2021	1 season	22 minutes	Currently airing
Pay Back The Money	Debt-collection	10 July 2021	1 season	22 minutes	Currently airing
Dare Lie To Me	Lie detector test	10 July 2021	1 season	22 minutes	Currently airing
Beef!	Conflict resolution	10 July 2021	2 seasons, 52 episodes	22 minutes	Ended
Ng'khokhele	Debt-collection	21 August 2021	1 season	22 minutes	Currently airing.
Stena Redemption	Reality	22 August 2021	2 seasons, 52 episodes	22 minutes	Currently airing
Tsebisa	Reality	9 January 2022	1 season	22–24 minutes	Currently airing
Missing Closure	Reality	1 October 2022	1 season, 26 episodes	23 minutes	Pending
Toxic Parents	Reality	15 January 2023	1 season, 13 episodes	22–24 minutes	Pending
Love & Conflict	Reality	15 January 2023	1 season, 13 episodes	23 minutes	Pending
Wifey Material	Dating series	16 April 2023	1 season, 13 episodes	22 minutes	Ended
Um'shiya Nini?	Toxic relationship intervention	16 April 2023	1 season, 13 episodes	23 minutes	Ended
Gospel Superstars	Music competition	25 May 2025	1 season, 13 episodes	46 minutes	Pending

=== Docuseries ===
Title	Subject	Premiere	Seasons	Runtime	Status
3rd Degree	Investigative series	21 August 2000	1 season		Ended
Checkpoint	Investigative series	8 April 2014	10 seasons	22 minutes	ongoing
The Close-up	Celebrity autobiography	20 August 2011	2 seasons	22 minutes	Ended
Above Ground: A Revolution Untold	Music	17 November 2015	1 season, 13 episodes	22–25 minutes	Ended
Case Closed: Justice Served	True Crime	15 January 2018	1 season, 13 episodes	22–24 minutes	Ended
Almost News with Chester Missing	Satirical news/interview	25 November 2018	1 season, 26 episodes	22 minutes	Ended
Mjolo - The Pandemic	Relationships				
The Devi Show	Consumer investigation	12 June 2020	5 seasons, 65 episodes	22 minutes	pending
Scammed	True Crime	15 April 2023	1 season, 26 episodes	22 minutes	Ended
Gangland	Cape Town gangs	8 November 2024	2 season, 8 episodes	22–24 minutes	Ended
Nyama Battle	Street food cooking competition	23 February 2025	1 season, 13 episodes	44–46 minutes	Renewed
Class of '96: Rise of a Nation	Sport documentary	25 January 2026	1 season, 6 episodes	44–46 minutes	pending

=== Variety ===
Title	Genre	Premiere date	Seasons	Runtime	Status
Club 808: Make Some Noise	Music lifestyle	20 August 2010	unspecified	22 minutes	Ended
Late Nite News with Loyiso Gola	Satirical news/interview	29 September 2010	12 seasons, 154 episodes	22 minutes	Ended
Cooking Gospel	Music, cooking, lifestyle	28 April 2013	1 season, 13 episodes	22 minutes	Ended
Ekse Zwakala	Talk show	15 October 2013	3 seasons, 216 episodes	22 minutes	Ended
Gumba Gumba	Music, lifestyle	16 October 2013	2 seasons, 52 episodes	22 minutes	Ended
Katch it with Khanyi	Talk show	18 October 2013	3 seasons 91 episodes	22 minutes	Ended
Kasi-licious	Cooking show	21 October 2013	3 seasons	22 minutes	Ended
Gym eKasi	Fitness show	20 May 2014	1 season, 13 episodes	22 minutes	Ended
Musiek Musiek	Music magazine, lifestyle	10 September 2014	1 season, 13 episodes	22 minutes	ended
Kasi Living: Edladleni	Lifestyle magazine	1 February 2015	1 season, 13 episodes	22 minutes	Ended
The Morning Show	Lifestyle magazine	21 August 2019	6 seasons	2 hours	Currently airing
Bôll & Ôll	Sports talk show	26 May 2024	1 season, 13 episodes	24 minutes	Pending
Ja, Daddy kan Lekker Eet	Cooking/Talk show	26 May 2024	1 season, 13 episodes	24 minutes	Pending
The Dan Corder Show	Satirical news/interview	6 May 2024	unspecified	24 minutes	ongoing

== Co-productions ==
These shows have been commissioned by e.tv in cooperation with another network

Title	Partner	Genre	Premiere	Seasons	Runtime	Status
Isipho	Viu South Africa	Supernatural Telenovela	1 July 2019	1 season, 100 episodes	22–25 minutes	Cancelled
Redemption	BET Africa	Telenovela	26 September 2022	1 season, 260 episodes	22–24 minutes	Ended

== Films ==
=== Feature films ===
Note: premiere dates are for the eVOD streaming platform only. Premiere dates may differ, as some movies premiere first on other platforms or on international film festivals.

Title	eVOD Premiere	Genre	Runtime
Atlantis	6 August 2021	Crime and drama	90 minutes
Daryn's Gym	1 December 2021	Comedy	92 minutes
Piet's Sake	15 December 2021	Comedy	91 minutes
Surviving Gaza	24 February 2022	Crime drama	90 minutes
Abafana Ababi	14 April 2022	Action	92 minutes
The Umbrella Men	14 June 2022	Crime comedy	117 minutes
An Eye for an Eye	19 July 2022	Crime	85 minutes
Whatever It Takes	16 August 2022	Crime drama	90 minutes
The Payback	13 September 2022	Crime drama	91 minutes
Gereza	18 October 2022	Crime drama	100 minutes
You're My Favourite Place	15 November 2022	Teen drama	111 minutes
Christmas Without Gogo	20 December 2022	Comedy	83 minutes
Dulas	14 February 2023	Comedy	96 minutes
Yolanda is Swanger	18 April 2023	Drama	90 minutes
Seconds	16 July 2023	Sport drama	90 minutes
Kleva-ish	17 August 2023	Comedy-drama	94 minutes
A Queen's Lobola	15 December 2023	Comedy	90 minutes
The Umbrella Men 2: Escape From Robben Island	25 April 2024	Crime comedy	113 minutes
Tickets	8 March 2024	Crime drama	97 minutes
Klip Anker Baai	27 June 2024	Drama	93 minutes
Proof of Payment	29 August 2024	Crime comedy	91 minutes
Bloedhond	31 October 2024	Horror	92 minutes
Death of a Whistleblower	25 November 2024	Political thriller	127 minutes
Neelan & Kevin	5 December 2024	Action comedy	88 minutes
The Drop	30 January 2025	Comedy	96 minutes
Family & Rugby	27 February 2025	Sports, crime drama	95 minutes
Red Zone	28 March 2025	Medical, crime	89 minutes
Snake	24 April 2025	Thriller	109 minutes

=== Documentaries ===
Title	Release date	Runtime	Language
Evil Unmasked: When Darkness Falls	2009	23 minutes	English, IsiZulu
Evil Unmasked: Silence of the Bones	2009	23 minutes	English
Evil Unmasked: The Station Strangler	2009	50 minutes	English
A Fatal Encounter: The Marleen Konings Story	2015	23 minutes	English
A Deal with The Devil: The Joshlin Smith Trafficking Tragedy	18 March 2024	23 minutes	English
Ground Zero - George Building Collapse	15 May 2024	46 minutes	English

=== Specials ===
Title		Runtime	Language
KwaNgonyama: The Movie	Smoke & Mirrors short film	5 minutes	English, IsiXhosa
Alfred Adrian - Family Meeting	one-man show	83 minutes	English, Afrikaans

== Continuations ==
These shows have been picked up by e.tv for additional seasons after airing previous seasons from another network.

Title	Genre	Previous network	Seasons	Runtime	Status
Fear Factor South Africa	Game show	M-Net	2 seasons	45 minutes	Ended
SA's Got Talent (season 3–8)	Reality competition	SABC 2	5 seasons, 15 episodes	45–50 minutes	Ended
She's The One (season 2)	Reality competition	SABC 3	1 season, 13 episodes	22–25 minutes	Ended
The Ultimate Braai Master (season 3–)	Reality competition	SABC 3	5 seasons	45 minutes	Pending.
Die Kontrak (season 2-)	Reality competition	VIA	2 season, 26 episodes	45 minutes	Pending
The Perfect Picture (season2)	Celebrity reality competition	SABC 1	1 season, 13 episodes	45 minutes	Ended
uBettina Wethu	Telenovela	SABC 1/Viu	1 season, 56 episodes	22 minutes	Ended
MasterChef South Africa season 6	Reality cooking competition	SABC 3	1 season, 13 episodes	45 minutes	pending

== Upcoming original programming ==
Title	Genre	Premiere
Dear Sis Dolly	Dramedy film	TBA
Hunting Jessica Brok	Crime Thriller	TBA
