= 2018 in South African television =

This is a list of South African television-related events in 2018.

== Events ==
- 4 February - Strictly Come Dancing moves from SABC to M-Net under the new name Dancing with the Stars. Chris Jaftha will host the show along with Tracey Lange.
- 21 August - ANN7 shuts down shortly after being renamed to Afro Worldview and is replaced by Newzroom Afrika

== Debuts ==
=== Domestic ===
- 4 February - Dancing with the Stars (M-Net) (2018–present)

=== International ===
- 5 February - (United Kingdom) / (Canada) / (United States) Sunny Day (Nick Jr.)
- 26 February - (Italy) / (France) / (Canada) Trulli Tales (Disney Junior)
- 23 April - (United States) DuckTales (2017) (Disney XD)
- 23 April - (Australia) Kitty Is Not a Cat (Disney Channel)
- 24 June - (Canada) Top Wing (Nick Jr.)
- 3 September - (United States) Muppet Babies (2018) (Disney Junior)
- 29 September - (United Kingdom) / (United States) Apple & Onion (Cartoon Network)
- 31 October - (United States) Rise of the Teenage Mutant Ninja Turtles (Nickelodeon)

=== Changes of network affiliation ===
Shows	Moved from	Moved to
(United States) Blindspot	M-Net City	1Magic
(United States) The Real Housewives of Beverly Hills	Vuzu Amp	1Magic
(Canada) What About Mimi?	eToonz	SABC2
(United States) / (Canada) / (Singapore) Dinosaur Train	Top TV	SABC2
(United States) Nashville	M-Net Family	Vuzu
(United States) Prison Break	SABC3	M-Net City
(United States) Supernatural	Vuzu Amp	M-Net City
(United States) Are We There Yet?	Vuzu	eExtra
(United States) Little Big Shots	e.tv	eExtra
(United States) / (Canada) My Little Pony: Friendship is Magic	e.tv	eToonz
(United States) / (France) ALVINNN!!! and the Chipmunks	Nicktoons	eToonz

== Television shows ==
=== 1980s ===
- Good Morning South Africa (1985-present)
- Carte Blanche (1988–present)

=== 1990s ===
- Top Billing (1992–present)
- Generations (1994–present)
- Isidingo (1998–present)

=== 2000s ===
- Idols South Africa (2002–present)
- Rhythm City (2007–present)
- SA's Got Talent (2009–present)

=== 2010s ===
- The Voice South Africa (2016–present)

== New channels ==
- 14 February - Moja Love
- 19 November - eReality
- 19 November - e.tv News & Sport

== Deaths ==
Joshua David Vassen (Young O.G) 9 November (18 years)

== See also ==
- 2018 in South Africa
