= EBella =

South African satellite TV channel

eBella
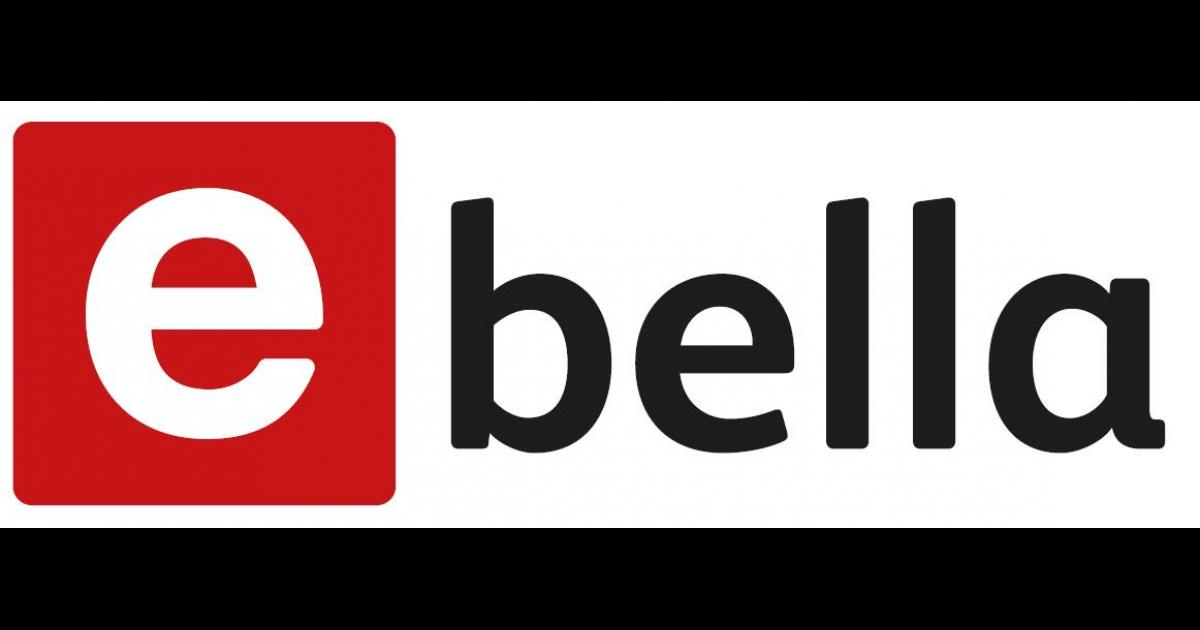
- Country: South Africa
- Network: e.tv

Programming
- Language: English
- Picture format: 16:9 (576i SDTV), 16:9 (1080i HDTV)

Ownership
- Owner: eMedia Holdings
- Sister channels: e.tv eToonz eMovies eExtra eMovies Extra eReality eNCA; News and Sport eSERIES ePlesier eXplore

History
- Launched: 5 March 2018; 8 years ago
- Closed: 31 March 2019; 7 years ago

eBella was a South African Digital satellite television channel created and owned by e.tv's eMedia Investment for Openview and DStv.

== History ==
After eMedia Investments and Platco Digital successfully launched its OpenView platform, they decided to expand their family of channels. With eExtra in particular being popular in airing telenovelas such as Santa Diabla, e.tv decided to bulk in on international dramas and series.

The launch was also because of a new local content channel on DStv called Moja Love, launched on 14 February 2015. The channel was centered to love and relationship seekers, to which e.tv created eBella to be a female-skewed channel.

eBella was terminated at the end of March 2019 due to low viewership. All content was moved to eExtra.

== Programming ==
eBella shows a number of local and international series, movies, dramas, and telenovelas.

- Meri Aashiqui Tum Se Hi
- Madhubala – Ek Ishq Ek Junoon
- Covert Affairs
- Kasilicious
- Exploring the Vine
- Married in 7 Days
- Mahadi-Lobola
- Naagin (2015 TV series)
- Films and Stars
- Joia Rara
- Itna Karo Na Mujhe Pyaar
- Charlie's Cake Angels
- Nirmala's Spice World
- The Girl named Feriha
- Black Money Love
- Instaglamour
- Bin Kuch Kahe
- Santa Diabla
- Caribbean Flower
- La impostora
- Tierra de reyes
- A-List Listings
- Fashion Forward
- My Name is Sarah
- Princess (TV series)
