= Hustle (South African TV series) =

South African television drama series

- Genre: Crime; Music
- Based on: Original concept by Fanyana Hlabangane and Bridget Pickering
- Written by: Ben Johnson Jr. Thandi Brewer; Ben Horowitz
- Directed by: Jahmil X.T. Qubeka
- Starring: Brenda Ngxoli; Sisanda Henna; Dineo Ranaka
- Music by: Tigerfight; Garth Barnes; Fabian Sing; Lungelo Lubelwana.
- Country of origin: South Africa
- Original languages: English, IsiXhosa, SeSotho, IsiZulu
- No. of seasons: 1
- No. of episodes: 26

Production
- Executive producers: Bridget Pickering; Dan Jawitz; Neil Brandt
- Producers: Neil Brandt; Dan Jawitz; Bridget Pickering
- Cinematography: Grace Harrison
- Editor: Layla Swart
- Camera setup: Multi-camera
- Running time: 46-48 minutes
- Production company: Fireworx Media

Original release
- Network: eKasi+
- Release: 11 February 2016

Hustle is a South African television drama series directed by Jahmil X.T. Qubeka with executive producers Bridget Pickering, Dan Jawitz and Neil Brandt. It is an e.tv original series produced by Fireworx Media for eKasi+ and stars Brenda Ngxoli, Zolisa Xaluva, Dineo Ranaka, Petronella Tshuma, Mandisa Nduna and Masello Motana. The series follows a washed-out superstar who attempts to redeem herself and revive her career.

== Plot ==
Kitt Khambule (Brenda Ngxoli) started her music career well in the 80s with The Sparrows, a trio with her sister and her best friend. Her extraordinary voice and ambition led her to break away from the trio and rise to superstardom. Her career crashes and burns after a series of no-shows in her concerts, cut ties with those close to her, and her drug addiction. She tries making a comeback with her latest concert, only to fail again in pitching on time. This forces her to flee back home, broke, desperate and on the run from creditors. She takes street urchins Baby (Petronella Tshuma) and Thuli (Mandisa Nduna) through a journey, which eerily mirrors her own, to the height of stardom.

== Cast ==
- Brenda Ngxoli as Kitt
- Dineo Ranaka as Kedibone
- Zolisa Xaluva as Bra X
- Carlo Radebe as Jacob/Moses
- Masello Motana as Neo
- Andile Nebulane as Duma
- Angela Sithole as Tai Chi / Angel
- Lungelo Lubelwana as Sbu
- Mandisa Nduna as Thuli
- Mothusi Magano as Maxwell
- Lethabo Bereng as Pretty
- Petronella Tshuma as Baby
- Sisanda Henna as Moruti Sampson
- Nicole Bailey as Rea
- Alex Motswiri as Vusimusi
- Anthony Bishop as Vince

== Production ==
In an interview with City Press, Jahmil XT Qubeka, director of the series, described it as being very racy, filled with sex, drugs and music, and that “The sensibilities and the approach to the show aren’t typical,” says Qubeka. “We’re shooting a long feature on a TV schedule and on a TV budget.”

Filming took place around Johannesburg, as well as in Soweto.

== Broadcast ==
Hustle premiered on February 11, 2016, on the defunct eKasi+, and was aired for 13 episodes before the show went on a year-long hiatus. The series was initially thought to be removed on account of its risque sexual scenes, but resumed in January 2017, to coincide with the return transmission on e.tv, in a new timeslot of Wednesdays at 21h00. 23 episodes were aired on the channel, with the remaining episodes moved to eExtra, on Wednesday 5 April.

The series was later added to e.tv:s streaming service, eVOD.
