= Uthingo Management v Minister of Trade and Industry =

South African legal case

Uthingo Management (Pty) Ltd v Minister of Trade and Industry is an important case in South African administrative law, in which the applicant sought an order interdicting the second and third respondents from operating a national lottery in South Africa, pending the final determination of the applicant's review application.

In the second part of the application, the applicant sought the review and setting aside of the first respondent's award to a third party of a licence to conduct the national lottery.

The court, having considered the evidence, made the following observations:

My view is that for the Minister of Trade and Industry to comply with the requirements of section 13(2)(b)(iv) and (3)(b) of the Lotteries Act [... he] must at least be aware or have had information about all the shareholders of the third respondent and all individual shareholders in the entities which constitute the third respondent. Failure to secure the said information will not enable the Minister to comply with the provisions of the Lotteries Act.

The Lotteries Board, when advising the Minister of Trade and Industry, as required by section 10(a) of the Lotteries Act, performs an administrative act, as the Minister might act in accordance with their recommendation. Furthermore, the court found, when advising the Minister, the Board is bound to apply principles of openness and transparency. Failure on their part to consider all the relevant and material information prior to advising the Minister is also subject to judicial review, as provided for in section 6(2) of the Promotion of Administrative Justice Act.

There were serious shortcomings, the court held, in the investigation the Board carried out and consequently in the memorandum it presented to the Minister. The Board did not investigate, and its memorandum did not contain information (or, at least, information which was material to the Minister and the recommendation) about the individual shareholders of the entities that constituted both the applicant and the third respondent.

The Minister and the National Lotteries Board failed to consider or take into account mandatory and material information prescribed by section 13 of the Lotteries Act, namely the shareholders in the entities which constitute the applicant.

The decision to award the licence to Gidani was accordingly set aside.

== See also ==
- South African administrative law
