= Toasty =

Toasty or Toastie may refer to:

- Toasty (wine), a wine tasting descriptor
- Toastie, a sandwich made in a pie iron
- Toasty: Ashes of Dusk, a role-playing video game scheduled for release in 2024
- "Toasty!", a Dan Forden catchphrase first heard in Mortal Kombat II
- Post Toasties, a breakfast cereal
- The Toasty Show, a South African television programme

== See also ==
- Toast (disambiguation)
