= Broken Vows (TV series) =

2017 South African television series

- Genre: Telenovela · Drama
- Created by: Helen Smit
- Starring: Thembi Mtshali-Jones; Jo-anne Reyneke; Enhle Mbali Maphumulo; Sello Sebotsane; Thapelo Mokoena
- Country of origin: South Africa
- Original language: English
- No. of seasons: 1
- No. of episodes: 255

Production
- Executive producer: Clive Morris
- Producer: Genna Lewis (Creative Producer)
- Production locations: Johannesburg, South Africa
- Running time: 24 minutes
- Production company: Clive Morris Productions

Original release
- Network: e.tv
- Release: 10 April 2017

Broken Vows is a South African television drama series created and produced by Helen Smit and executive produced by Clive Morris. It is an e.tv original series produced by Clive Morris Productions for e.tv, and stars Thembi Mtshali-Jones, Jo-anne Reyneke, Enhle Mbali Mlotshwa, Mandla Gaduka, Thapelo Mokoena, Emmanuel Castis, Shaleen Surtie-Richards, Lehasa Moloi and Nambitha Ben-Mazwi.

== Plot ==
Thandi and Azania Moswane, run the family-owned wedding planning business Yours Truly in Johannesburg. Entrusted by their mother, Gertrude, to be the top wedding planners, they juggle professional success with personal secrets and family drama. The return of their father, Ace, from prison brings conflict, as he clashes with Gertrude over family matters.

== Cast ==
=== Main cast ===
- Thembi Mtshali-Jones as Gertrude Moswane – The matriarch of the Moswane family, founder of Yours Truly Concepts.
- Jo-anne Reyneke as Thandi Moswane – The youngest of the Moswane family, running the wedding business and seeking her mother's approval.
- Enhle Mbali Mlotshwa as Azania Moswane – Thandi's adopted sister and business partner, senior wedding planner of Yours Truly.
- Sello Sebotsane as Ace Moswane – The family patriarch. His return from prison and quest for revenge sparks tension in the family.
- Thapelo Mokoena as Uhuru Moswane – Thandi and Azania's brother, the eldest of the Moswane children, a journalist who returns after an investigation from the Congo.

=== Supporting cast ===
- Nomsa Nene as Lydia – Thandi's biological mother, previous business partner to Gertrude. She seeks a relationship with Thandi.
- Shaleen Surtie-Richards as Charmaine – Florist and best friend to Gertrude
- Emmanuel Castis as Chris Myburgh – Husband to Azania, a retired professional soccer player with a short career span due to a back injury.
- Mandla Gaduka as Damian – Wedding decor specialist, previously seen at Namane Funerals, he joins Yours Truly for a change of scenery.
- Lehasa Moloi as Lebo, wedding photographer of Yours Truly Concepts.
- Nambitha Ben-Mazwi as Lulama – manager of the bridal couture department.
- Clementine Mosimane as Keketso
- Nicole Bessick as Chloe
- Joe Kazadi as Simao

== Broadcast ==
A private screening of the series was held at Four Seasons Hotel The Westcliff, Johannesburg, on Thursday, 6 April 2017. The series premiered on the 10th of April 2017 on e.tv. It was then shifted to sister channel eExtra on 15 January 2018.
