= Khanyi Mbau =

South African actress (born 1985)

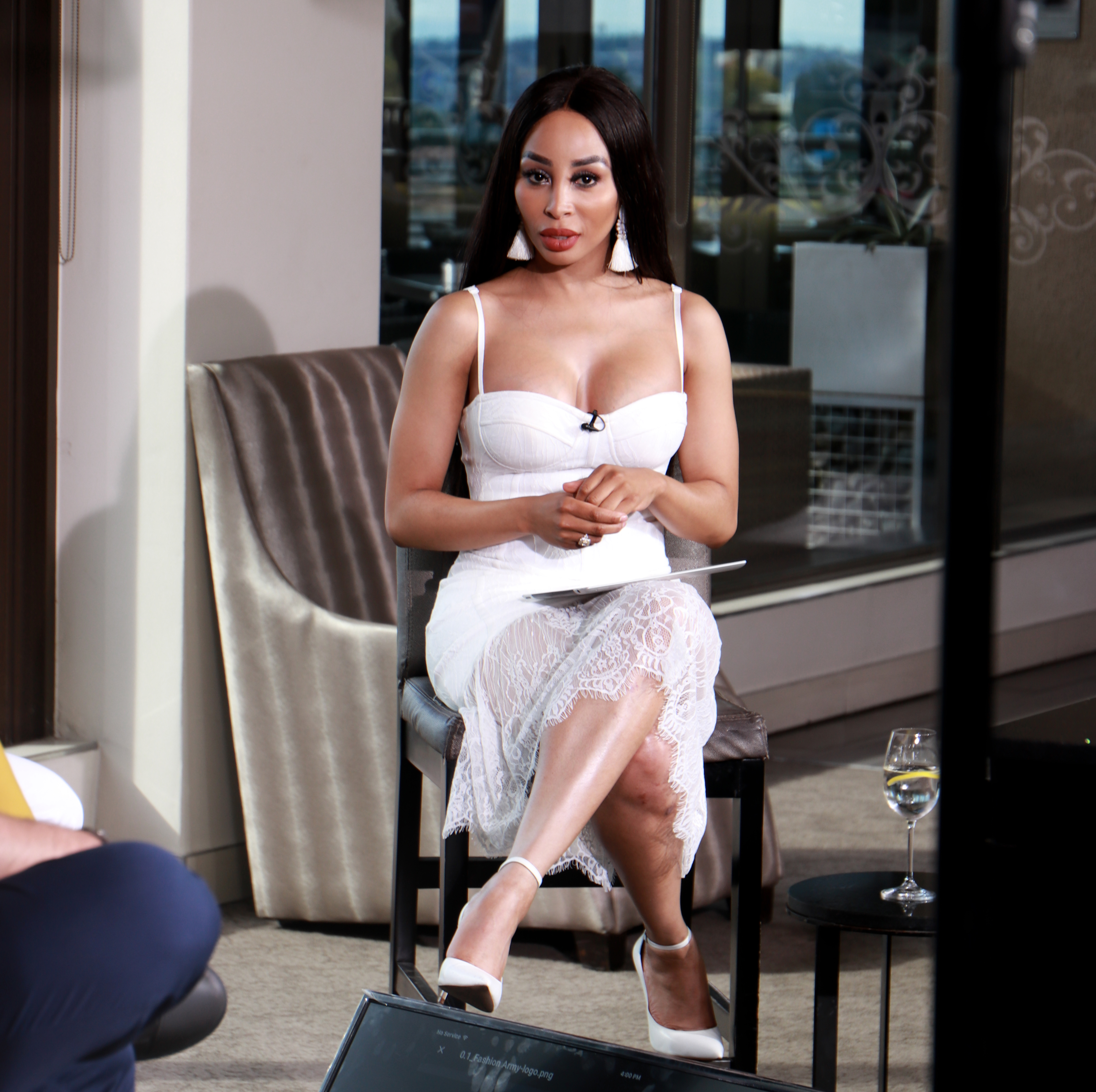
- Mbau in December 2017
- Born: Khanyisile Jacqueline Mchunu Mbau; 15 October 1984 (age 42); Soweto, South Africa
- Citizenship: South African-Saudi Arabian
- Occupations: Actress; television personality; artist; businesswoman
- Years active: 2004–present
- Spouse: Mandla Mthembu (m. 2006; div. 2009)
- Children: Khanukani Mbau (daughter)
- Parent(s): Menzi Mcunu (father); Lynette Sisi Mbau (mother)
- Relatives: Lasizwe Dambuza (half-brother)
- Musical career
- Genres: Hip hop; Afro-pop
- Instrument: Vocals
- Labels: Mabala Noise (former); CCP Record Company
- Website: https://mykhanyimbau.com

Khanyisile Mbau is a South African actress, musician, television presenter and socialite. She received recognition as the second Doobsie on SABC 2's soap opera Muvhango (2004–2005); as Mbali in the SABC 1 soap opera Mzansi and SABC 1's mini-series After Nine. As of 2018, She is the host of the SABC 3 entertainment show The Scoop and The Big Secret on BET Africa, and plays Tshidi on Mzansi Magic's Abomama.

== Early life ==
Khanyisile Mbau was born on 16 October 1985. Her mother, Lynette Sisi Mbau, worked in the finance department of the pension fund at Barclays Bank. Her father, Menzi Mcunu, was not married to her mother at the time as the couple were only dating. Mcunu had no claim to the child but he named her nevertheless: Khanyisile (one who brings light). Mbau kept her mother's surname. Lynette soon left baby Khanyi with her parents in Mofolo, Soweto and returned to work, leaving her grandmother virtually raising her.

Mbau's grandparents were very Western in the way they dressed and saw the world. Mbau said, "Gladys (her grandmother) would cane you if you broke the rules. She ran her household with the decorum and attention to detail of Buckingham Palace". Mbau lovingly referred to her as the "Queen of England".

== Career ==
=== Television ===
In 2004, Mbau replaced actress Lindiwe Chibi in the role of Doobsie on Muvhango after Chibi was shot by her boyfriend Dan Mokoena. A year later she was fired from the role, reportedly for spending too much time partying and appearing in the Sunday tabloids. In 2006 Mbau joined the SABC 1 hit drama series Mzansi, in its second season, as Mbali. SABC 1 did not renew the show for a third season. Later in 2007 Mbau played the role of Zee in the SABC 1 mini-series After 9.

In 2012 she was the guest judge on the second season of SABC 1's Turn It Out. In 2013 she starred in an episode of E.tv's anthology drama series, Ekasi: Our Stories. She also featured in the DStv Vuzu documentary, I Am, and she portrayed Sindisiwe Sibeko on DStv's Mzansi Magic mini-series Like Father Like Son.

In August 2012, Mbau released her biography Bitch, Please! I'm Khanyi Mbau, written by the journalist Lesley Mofokeng.

In 2013, Mbau featured in the docu-reality television series Reality Check on E.tv. In the same year, Mbau began hosting her own talk show on the OpenView HD channel eKasi+, Katch It With Khanyi. The show was renewed for a second season in late 2014. It reached number one in audience share for talk shows, exceeding the share of SABC 2's Motswako. Katch It With Khanyi debuted with a viewership of 785,000 viewers, which increased to 1,669,000 in the first week of November 2014. During the show's second season, it was nominated for the South African Film and Television Awards 2015.

In 2014, Mbau competed in the seventh season of Strictly Come Dancing. In week 7 she and partner Quintus Jansen failed to earn enough votes to remain in the competition, and she was eliminated. There was an initial controversy on social media as super-fans of Mbau expressed their disappointment and questioned the integrity of the voting process. Mbau competed in the first episode of the second season of MTV Africa Lip Sync Battles, where she faced off with fellow musician Nadia Nakai.

In April 2015, Mbau landed the supporting role of "Pinky" in E.tv's first-ever telenovela, Ashes to Ashes. In November 2015, she was nominated for "Best Instagram Account" in the Channel24 Online Awards, which honored local musicians, stars and public figures who have a powerful and influential online presence.

In March 2016, Mbau landed the role of Palesa Tladi in the hit television drama series Umlilo; the character was a closet lesbian state prosecutor who entered into a polygamous marriage, and her sole goal was to have children. In July 2016, Mbau landed a new television show on SABC 3 called The Weekend Edition alongside radio and TV host Phat Joe. The duo hosted the lifestyle show on weekend mornings, filmed in Cape Town.

In July 2017, Mbau appeared in a new entertainment show titled The Scoop which aired on SABC 3 as part of the channel's new lineup. In September 2017, BET Africa channel announced a new 13-part reality series titled The Big Secret, hosted by Mbau. In the series, she gets participants to reveal their darkest secrets. The show aired to air on October 25, 2017, and ended with a two-part reunion episode.

In March 2018, Mbau joined the cast of South Africa's most watched TV show, Uzalo, on SABC 1, portraying the role of go-getter Dinekile aka Lady Die who is a shoplifter by trade and aspires for a life like her cousin MaNgcobo. Having done short stints in jail for petty crimes and knows her way around the underworld, she has not achieved what she wants yet. In July 2019, Mbau announced her return to the show for its 5th season. In April 2018, Mzansi Magic released a trailer for their new drama series, Abomama, which examines and challenges the ideas of faith and sin. Mbau takes the lead role playing Tshidi, an approval-seeking former ghetto queen turned suburban wife who is married to a reputable doctor played by Leroy Gopal. The show debuted with over a million viewers, making it the third most watched show on DStv.

In July 2023, Mbau was announced as the host of 2nd annually Basadi in Music Awards, which was held at Joburg Theatre.

=== Radio ===
In 2016, Mbau became the host of a radio show on Metro FM, Whose show is it anyway, alongside entertainers Somizi Mhlongo and Ntombi Ngcobo. The show premiered nationally on July 18, 2016, and ran for a year until it came to an end in the reshuffle of the station.

=== Film ===
Mbau's first feature film, Happiness is a Four-letter Word, premiered on February 19, 2016. She played the role of Zaza, trophy wife to Bheki (Simo Magwaza), mother of two, and owner of a shoe store. The film premiered with box office-smashing numbers and continued with gross box office receipts over R7 million in its third week on the cinema circuit. It ended up surpassing the R10 million mark.

In 2017, Mbau began production of her second film with filmmaker and comedian Leon Schuster, Frank and Fearless, which was set for cinema release in 2018.

Mbau's third film, a thriller titled The Red Room, was set for cinema release in 2019.

=== Business ventures ===
In November 2018, Mbau announced the launch of her own brand of gin called I Am Khanyi - Millennial Shimmer Gin.

In 2023, Mbau got a role in the series The Wife in which she played Zandile who is married to one of the Zulu brothers.

== Filmography ==
=== Film roles ===
| Year | Film | Role |
|---|---|---|
| 2015 | Hear Me Move | |
| 2025 | Meet the Khumalos | Grace Khumalo |

Television roles
| Year | Television Show | Role |
|---|---|---|
| 2019 | The Scoop | Host - herself |
| 2014–2020 | Katch It With Khanyi | Host - herself |
| | After 9 | Zee |
| 2018 | Isithembiso | Herself |
| 2015–2016 | Ashes to Ashes | Pinki |
| | aYeYe | Thenjiwe |
| | Check - Coast | |
| | eKasi: Our Stories | Thabiso/Thandisiwe |
| | I Am | Herself |
| | Like Father Like Son | Sindisiwe Sibeko |
| | Muvhango | Doobsie |
| 2018–2019 | Uzalo | Dinekile aka Lady Die |
| | My Perfect Family | Herself |
| | Mzansi | Mbali |
| | Mzansi Love - Kasi Love | Kgomotso |
| | Mzansi Love - Big City Love | Lebo Kgosi |
| | Reality Check | Herself |
| | Scandal | Katlego |
| | Skwizas | Mimi |
| | Strictly Come Dancing | Celebrity dancer - herself |
| | The Close Up | Herself |
| | The Comedy Central Roast | Roaster - herself |
| | The Lab | Kgomotso/Busi |
| | The South African Film and Television Awards | Presenter - herself |
| | The South African Music Awards | Host/presenter - herself |
| | Tropika Island of Treasure - Thailand | Herself |
| | Turn it Out - Street Battle | Guest judge - herself |
| | Happiness Is a Four-Letter Word | Zaza |
| 2021 | Happiness Ever After | Zaza |
| 2022 | Young Famous & African | Herself |
| 2022–present | The Wife | Zandile Zulu |

== Awards and nominations ==
=== South African International Film Academy Awards ===
| Year | Nominee / work | Award | Result |
|---|---|---|---|
| 2019 | Red Room | Best Actress | Won |
