= Kelders van Geheime =

- Written by: Theltom Masimila; Wilmien Rossouw; Martina Theunissen; Henrietta Gryffenberg; Marlise Erwee; Ricardo Arendse; Maritha Broschk; Dean Richard Olivier; Saartjie Botha
- Directed by: Heleni Handt; Darryl Fuchs; Maurice Paige
- Music by: Loki Rothman
- Country of origin: South Africa
- Original language: Afrikaans
- No. of seasons: 2
- No. of episodes: 260

Production
- Executive producers: Karen Meiring; Theltom Masimila
- Production location: Franschhoek
- Camera setup: Multi-camera
- Running time: 22-24 minutes
- Production company: KFilms

Original release
- Network: e.tv
- Release: 6 May 2024

Kelders van Geheime is a South African television drama series executive produced by Karen Meiring and Theltom Masimila. It is an e.tv original series produced by KFilms for e.tv, and stars Nic de Jager, Sandra Prinsloo, Cedwyn Joel, Vinette Ebrahim and Duane Williams, amongst others.

== Plot ==
Set in the picturesque Cape winelands farm, the series focuses on the Soebatskloof community, focusing on familial and social relationships, business rivalries, and the uncovering of deep-seated secrets. The story kicks off with preparations for a celebration marking another decade of the Marais family on the wine farm. As events unfold, major announcements disrupt the harmony, leading to conflicts and alliances among the families and their employees.

== Production ==
=== Development ===
The series was pitched to e.tv in 2023, and was commissioned for 260 episodes.

=== Filming ===
Filming began in January 2024, on location at the Plaisir Wine Estate, Simondium, between Stellenbosch and Franschhoek.

=== Casting ===
The cast was officially announced in between March and April 2024.

In March 2024, e.tv announced that it will be debuting the telenovela on the channel.

=== Music ===
Original music score, including the title sequence, was composed by Loki Rothman.

== Broadcast ==
Prescreening of the series took place at the Plaisir de Merle Wine Estate.

The series premiered on 6 May 2024, simulcast on e.tv and eExtra. The series was added a month later on the streaming service eVOD, with five episodes being added each week.

== Reception ==
In its first month of broadcast, the series reached 1.6 million viewers, according to the Broadcasting Research Council's TAMS review.
