= Dineo Ranaka =

South African radio presenter and music DJ

- Born: 16 January 1983 (age 42); Soweto, Johannesburg, South Africa
- Occupations: Radio personality; TV presenter; actress; DJ; TV producer
- Years active: 2003–present
- Known for: The Ranakas (tv show)
- Spouse: Klaas Phesha(sep)2023
- Relatives: Manaka Ranaka (sister); Mpumi Ranaka (sister); Mzingisi Ranaka (brother); Ranaka Ranaka (brother)

Dineo Ranaka (born 16 January 1983) is a South African radio personality, television presenter, actress, DJ, and TV producer.

Ranaka started her career at 5FM in 2003 presenting the Fanta World Chart Show with Brown Sugar. She then moved to YFM, Highveld Stereo (later 947), Metro FM, and Cliff Central. She was the co-host and producer of the YFM drive time show Essential Rush. Ranaka then took a long break after which she joined Metro FM to host The Bridge, a mid-morning show and Metro FM Top 40 shortly after that. Currently, she is the main anchor for Kaya 959's breakfast show.

Ranaka garnered local attention after her show "Dineo Live on Drive" on YFM which was a great success, with her talent combined with her "can-do" attitude that landed her in the driver's seat as YFM's first female afternoon drive time jock on "Dineo Live on Drive" which she hosted every Monday to Friday from 3pm - 6pm. She made an on-screen hit on ETV's Club 808. Dineo also made appearances and starred in television series and shows which includes; Real Goboza, Scandal, Gaz'lam, Yim'lo, Dineo's Diary, Gomora, All Access Mzansi, and MoJa Love's Ishushu. Ranaka also starred as one of the main characters in a featured film Baby Mamas.

== Career ==
=== Yfm ===
Ranaka became successful in presenting the Breakfast show. It was her rapid success on her Weekend Breakfast Show that made her a candidate to take over from Chilli M's show, which aired daily between 15:00 and 18:00 weekdays, thereafter replacing the popular Vukani "Chilli M" Masinga who left the show. She then proved the critics wrong and in less than a year, grew the stations listener-ship to 750,000 in the 3 - 6pm time slot from the previous listener-ship of 600,000.

Ranaka hosted the "Dineo Live on Drive" show, making her YFM's first female afternoon drive time jock and is reckoned to be the only female afternoon drive time Radio DJ in the country. Her show's success impressed clients such as Love Life, Sanlam, Samsung, Motorola, Vodacom, Cadbury and Levis, who requested that she specifically run and drive their on-air campaigns.

=== Club 808 ===
During 2010 e.tv launched their lifestyle and music entertainment show aimed at the youth called Club 808 "Make Some Noise". It featured presenters Dineo Ranaka and Mo flava.in August 2010 During August 2010, Club 808 executive producer Zam Nkosi said: "The show will be fresh, very contemporary, fun, flirty and lightly irreverent, with the tongue firmly in cheek. It will certainly not take itself seriously.". The show currently airs on Etv.

=== Metro FM ===
Dineo Ranaka has had a notable career with Metro FM, South Africa's largest commercial radio station. She initially joined the station to co-host and produce "The Bridge," a mid-morning show, alongside Somizi Mhlongo. Together, they significantly increased the show's listenership. In 2025 Ranaka also hosted the "Metro FM Top 30" chart show, dedicated to showcasing the station's top music hits.

In 2022, Ranaka departed from Metro FM to accept a breakfast show position at Kaya 959. She clarified that this move was motivated by career growth opportunities and that her departure from Metro FM was amicable. In March 2025, Ranaka returned to Metro FM to host "The Saturday Top 30" show, expressing that the station felt like home and that she was pleased to be back.

=== Kaya 959 ===
In June 2022, Dineo Ranaka joined Kaya 959 as the anchor of the "959 Breakfast" show, airing weekdays from 6:00 to 9:00 AM. She co-hosted the program with Sol Phenduka, bringing a dynamic energy to the station's morning lineup.

In May 2023, Ranaka took a leave of absence to focus on her mental health. During this period, Kaya 959 publicly expressed support for her well-being. However, subsequent reports indicated that the station terminated her employment, citing unauthorised absences and a lack of communication regarding her medical issues. The station stated that they had made efforts to accommodate her challenges and facilitate her admission to a mental health facility.

=== Other appearances ===
In April 2014, Ranaka was a roaster at the Comedy Central Africa's Roast of Kenny Kunene. She also acted on Hustle, a South African TV series, in 2016.

=== Ventures ===
In 2019, Ranaka announced her new venture as a house and hip-hop DJ. In 2020, through her production company, she produced Mzali Wami, a drama series which aired on Mzansi Magic and Showmax. She owns cosmetic range LuvDrBeauty which launched 16 December 2020.

=== Podcast and Chill Network ===
On an episode of Podcast and Chill with MacG, MacG announced that Ranaka will be hosting her new podcast slot under the Podcast and Chill Network called 'Dineo On Sex and Stuff'. The show will be aired every Tuesday at 3 PM. This opportunity arose just as she parted ways with Kaya FM.

== Personal life ==
Dineo (meaning "gifts") was born in Diepkloof's Chris Hani Baragwanath Hospital, in South Africa. Dineo was educated at Unisa. She is the sister of South African actress Manaka Ranaka.

== Controversies ==
=== 2010 ===
In September 2010, fireworks erupted between singer Kelly Khumalo and Dineo Ranaka during rehearsals for the YFM and Chevrolet Divas party. A source told the Sunday World newspaper that things went wrong after Khumalo arrived at the rehearsals more than two hours late.

It is believed that Khumalo was not prepared for the gig: she was throwing tantrums and not following the brief. The "moo moos" hit the fan when Dineo asked Khumalo about motherhood. Dineo states that she was sitting down getting ready for the rehearsal while one of her colleagues was interviewing Khumalo for an insert in Club 808 on camera. She says the interview was based on Khumalo's music and she thought it had no depth because Khumalo didn't have a new album out yet. They have since made peace and become good friends

=== 2011 ===
In February 2011, Dineo had a breakdown on air and was subsequently taken off air, resulting in her content producer Bujy and co-host Linda Mbuso standing in for her.

During the afternoon drive show she started sobbing uncontrollably two hours before her show ended. When questioned about this by management, Dineo said she couldn't take it anymore. Sunday World states that she was crying because she had had a fight with YFM marketing manager Tamaria Motsepe, who had allegedly denied her the chance to attend that year's J&B Met in Cape Town. Motsepe told the paper that Dineo was facing a disciplinary hearing headed by station manager Tumelo Diaho-Monaheng.

=== J&B Met ===
During the J&B Met weekend in February, it was reported that she had lost it and that she went into a tirade on a bus, where she allegedly swore at Brenda Ngxoli and Palesa Mocuminyane. She then reportedly told Ngxoli and Mocuminyane off when they reprimanded her for complaining that Kenny Kunene took her friend and colleague Faith Mangope to Mzoli's Buy and Braai Butchery in Gugulethu. It is believed that "Dineo was shouting and screaming, asking how Kenny can go to Mzoli's Buy and Braai Butchery in Gugulethu with her colleague and friend (Faith),".

A witness states that Mocuminyane jokingly said: "Give another child a chance to enjoy him." "Dineo started screaming that she was going to teach both Mangope and Kunene a lesson, while crying and swearing." Dineo has since apologized for the confrontation.

== Hypothyroidism ==
Dineo reportedly spent three days in the Life Fourways Hospital after she was admitted for a brain-related chronic illness caused by stress and hypertension. On Thursday 24 February 2011, Dineo was admitted and discharged after two days of treatment following her diagnosis of hypothyroidism, a brain shrinkage, and temporal lobe epilepsy. It is reported that she was never in rehab, she was in the Life Fourways hospital. Dineo states that she was diagnosed with hypothyroidism in 2004 and that her condition was under control until the J&B Met. She has since become an advocate for mental health.
