= Die Fakulteit =

South African Comedy series

- Written by: George van Rooyen; Augusta Zietsman; Regardt Visser
- Directed by: George van Rooyen
- Starring: Bibi du Preez; Carien Botha; Abel Knobel; Tabita de Jager; Carl Trautman; Leigh-Ann Fourie; Tené Minderon; Zoricke Snyman
- Theme music composer: Zaan Sonnekus

Production
- Executive producers: Marno Koen; Michael van Zyl
- Producers: Mark Reuben; Mikhé Griesel
- Production location: Boksburg, Gauteng
- Production company: Coolerbox Brothers

Original release
- Network: eExtra
- Release: 14 April 2024 – present

Die Fakulteit (Afrikaans: [di fɑkulˈtɛit], lit. The Faculty) is a South African television comedy series executive produced by Marno Koen and Michael van Zyl. It is an e.tv original series produced by Coolerbox Brothers for eExtra, and stars Bibi du Preez, Carien Botha, Abel Knobel, Tabita de Jager, Carl Trautman, Leigh-Ann Fourie, Tené Minderon and Zoricke Snyman.

== Plot ==
Set in the fictional Hoërskool Oos in Johannesburg, the series follows a group of typical students who have become adults. As they try to manage the high school, they encounter many of the same challenges they faced as students, now finding themselves in positions of authority but struggling with their newfound responsibilities.

== Cast ==
- Bibi du Preez as Dr. Reinette Naudé, the eccentric principal of Hoërskool Oos.
- Leigh-Ann Fourie as Annetjie Kitshoff, the school secretary.
- Carl Trautman as Jan Gerber, the science teacher.
- Abel Knobel as Du Toit Meyer, the Rugby coach and Biology teacher.
- Zöricke Snyman as Amelia de Waal, the Afrikaans and drama teacher.
- Carien Botha as Susan Steyn, the Geography teacher and hockey coach, known for her competitive spirit both in and out of the classroom.
- Tené Minderon plays Sebine Kritzinger, the new Mathematics teacher.
- Tabitha de Jager as Naledi Makwena, the Home Economics teacher.

=== Recurring/guest appearances ===
- Black as himself.
- Zoe Jacobs as Cindy Swanepoel, the mean girl in the school
- Vrede, as themselves.
- Geraldine Pillay-Viret, as Moira Schoonhoven the principal of the neighboring school.

== Production ==
=== Development ===
Executive producer George van Rooyen developed the concept for the series after directing SABC 1 reality competition series Reno Race. Van Rooyen was inspired by conversations with friends, many of whom expressed uncertainty about adulthood and its responsibilities. This prompted him to create a comedy series that explores the challenges young people face as they navigate life as adults. Van Rooyen has mentioned being influenced by the classic teen comedies of the 1990s, which often featured archetypal characters such as "the jock," "the nerd," and "the arty girl." He envisioned these characters ten years later, still struggling with adulthood but now working as teachers in a school setting. Despite their new roles, they continue to experience high school-like drama, reflecting their ongoing difficulties with maturity. Van Rooyen also revealed that it took approximately eight years for the series to make its debut on national television.

The series was renewed for a second season. At the time, Van Rooyen faced challenges with writing, producing and filming the season due to family issues.

=== Filming ===
Filming for the series began in December 2023, during school holidays, on location in Hoërskool Oostelig in Boksburg, Gauteng. Several students of the school also were a part of the series.

== Broadcast ==
The series premiered on 14 April 2024 on eExtra. Episodes were added to stream ing service eVOD after their television debut.

== Reception ==
The series has attracted over 500 000 viewers in its season premiere.
