= Class of '96: Rise of a Nation =

2026 South African sports miniseries

- Written by: John Barker; Philip Roberts
- Directed by: John Barker; Robin Adams
- Narrated by: Robert Marawa
- Country of origin: South Africa
- Original language: English
- No. of seasons: 1
- No. of episodes: 6

Production
- Production companies: Known Associates Entertainment; Barking Rat Films; Sniper Films; AEIA; eMedia Investments

Original release
- Network: e.tv; eVOD
- Release: 25 January 2026

Class of '96: Rise of a Nation is a 2025 South African sports documentary miniseries chronicling the events of South Africa's national football team's victory at the 20th edition of the Africa Cup of Nations tournament. The series premiered on e.tv and eVOD on 25 January 2026.

== Production ==
The project was initially announced under the working title, Bafana the Boys. Director John Barker publicly discussed the series in a 2023 Variety interview while attending the Joburg Film Festival, at the screening of The Umbrella Men 2: Escape from Robben Island. Barker described the project as a "Last Dance-style" documentary and confirmed that he interviewed his father, former Bafana Bafana head coach Clive Barker, while his health was deteriorating.

The early announcement of the series coincided with Known Associates Group’s launch of its unscripted division, following the acquisition of a majority stake in Cape Town-based production company Zero Gravity. The documentary was positioned as part of the company’s expansion into non-fiction programming.

Producer and Group CEO of Known Associates Group Tshepiso Chikapa-Phiri described the project as a milestone in African storytelling, emphasising the importance of owning and controlling the narratives around African success stories in sport, from development through financing to production and distribution.

Mark Madai, executive producer at e.tv, highlighted the series’ cultural significance, framing it as a piece of South African heritage that captures a moment when the country was united through sport. Barker stressed the personal nature of the project, noting his lifelong connection to the story through his father and the broader impact of the team’s success on national consciousness, reinforcing the documentary’s dual role as both historical record and emotional reflection.

== Broadcast ==
The series premiered on e.tv on 25 January 2026, simultaneously released on streaming service eVOD.
