= Manaka Ranaka =

South African actress and television personality

- Born: 6 April 1979 (age 47); Soweto, Johannesburg, South Africa
- Education: Dinwiddie high school
- Occupations: Actress; TV personality; singer
- Years active: 1999–present
- Children: 3
- Parent(s): Kgotlaesele Ranaka (father); Nonceba Ranaka (mother)
- Relatives: Dineo Ranaka (sister); Mpumi Ranaka (sister); Ranaka Ranaka (brother); Mzingisi "Ziggy" Ranaka (brother); Michelle Ranaka (sister-in-law)

Manaka Ranaka (born 6 April 1979) is a South African actress known for playing her starring role for long standing soap opera Generations: The Legacy. In 2000, she played the role of Nandipha Sithole on Isidingo soap opera aired on SABC 3.

In 2007, she won the South African Film and Television Award (SAFTA) for Best Actress in a Television Comedy.

== Early life ==
Manaka was born on 6 April 1979, in Soweto. She attended Dinwiddie high school.

== Personal life ==
She is the mother of 3 children, Katlego, Naledi and a new baby.She is the sister of the radio personality, Actress,TV presenter and producer Dineo Ranaka

== Filmography ==
=== Television ===
Year	Film	Role	Notes
2000	Isidingo	Nandipha Sithole	Starring
2002	Gaz’lam	Portia	
2003	Stokvel	Lerata Khumalo	
2006	One Way	Nozuko	
2007	Home affairs	Neli	Starring
2007	dubbed Society	Ayanda	Starring
2012	Rhythm City	Zanele Kgaditse	
2013	Zabalaza		Starring
2014–Present	Generations:The Legacy	Lucy Diale	starring
