= Toast =

Toast most commonly refers to:

- Toast (food), bread browned with dry heat
- Toast (honor), a ritual in which a drink is taken

Toast or Toasted may also refer to:

== Places ==
- Toast, North Carolina, a census-designated place in the US

== Books ==
- Toast (play), 1999, by Richard Bean
- Toast, a memoir by Nigel Slater
- "A Toast" (anthem) ("Zdravljica"), a poem by France Prešeren and the Slovenian national anthem
- "A Toast", the title recorded in law for the North Carolina State Toast
- Toast: And Other Rusted Futures, a collection of short fiction by Charles Stross

== Film and TV ==
- The Toast (film), 2007 Chilean-Mexican film directed by Shai Agosin
- Toast (film), 2010 BBC film adaptation of Nigel Slater's autobiographical novel of the same name
- Toast of London, a British comedy television series, and its sequel Toast of Tinseltown
- "Toast" (Space Ghost Coast to Coast), a television episode
- Toasted TV, Australian children's television program
- "Toasted" (Generation), a television episode

== Music ==
=== Albums ===
- Toast (Tar album), 1993
- Toast! (The Arrogant Worms album), 2004
- Toasted (album), by Fatso Jetson
- Toast (Neil Young & Crazy Horse album), a previously unreleased Neil Young album

=== Songs ===
- "Toast" (song), by Streetband
- "Toast", by Tori Amos on the album The Beekeeper
- "Toast", by Heywood Banks
- "Toast", by Koffee from Rapture (EP)

=== Other uses in music ===
- Toasting (Jamaican music), talking or chanting over a rhythm or beat by a deejay

== Computing and the Internet ==
- Toast (NHN Entertainment), a web portal for mobile games
- Roxio Toast, a disc authoring and media conversion software program
- The Toast (website), a feminist general interest site
- Toast, Inc., a cloud-based restaurant software company
- Pop-up notification, a graphical control element
- "Toasted", a storyline in the science fiction comedy webtoon series Live with Yourself!

== See also ==
- Toaster (disambiguation)
- Toasty (disambiguation)
- It's Toasted
