= Connell Cruise =

South African musician (born 1987)

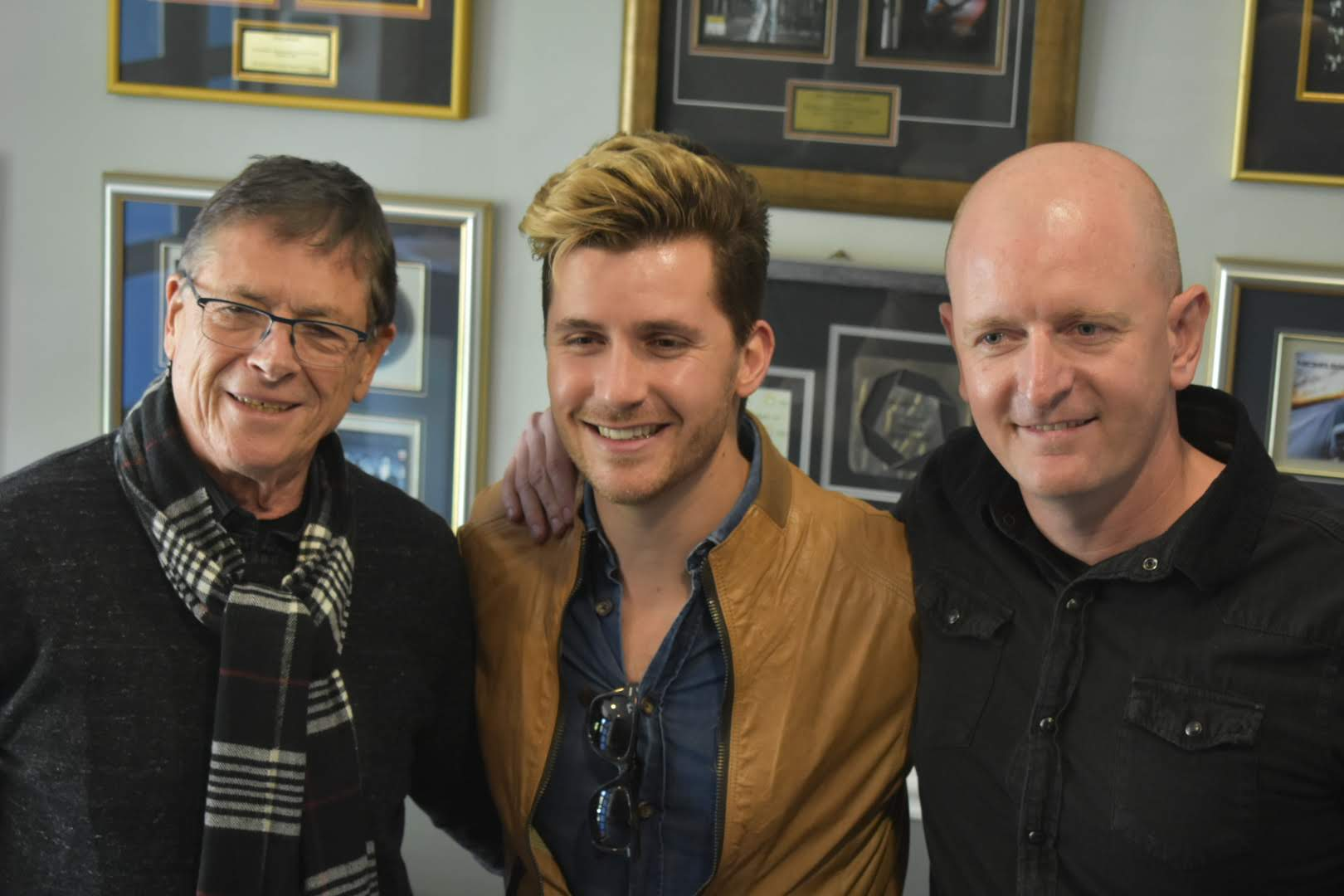
- David Gresham, Connell Cruise and Andrew Mitchley of David Gresham Records, 2019.
- Born: Connell Cruise Kingsburgh; 19 May 1987 (age 39); Johannesburg, South Africa
- Education: University of the Witwatersrand
- Occupations: Singer; Songwriter; Keyboardist
- Years active: 2011–present
- Spouse: Sarah Jeanne Kingsburgh (m. 2016)
- Children: Ivor Wright Kingsburgh (b. 2018)
- Musical career
- Genres: ACC; Pop
- Instruments: Vocal; Piano; Keyboards
- Labels: David Gresham Records; Sony; Universal
- Website: connellcruise.com

Connell Cruise Kingsburgh (born May 19, 1987) known professionally as Connell Cruise, is a South African singer, songwriter, performer, pianist, and musician.

In 2013 he released his debut solo album in South Africa through David Gresham Records, and would earn three South African Music Award nominations the following year. The lead single, "Not Just Friends," became his first number one single on South African radio charts.

He released "Into The Wild" as a follow-up single in 2014, which led to L.A. Reid signing Cruise to Epic Records in what is considered the largest and most significant record deal in South African music history.

Following his move to New York City, he released his international debut, Into The Wild EP, in 2015 through Island Records.

Cruise met his wife, Sarah, in New York City and in September 2016 the two were married at New York City Hall. The couple relocated to South Africa in 2017 to coincide with the release of his second studio album Barely Breathing, again through David Gresham Records. The album debuted at number one on the South African iTunes album chart and garnered Cruise his fifth South African Music Award nomination

In 2018, he was one of 12 celebrity contestants to compete in the first season of Dancing with the Stars South Africa, which he and his dancing partner, Marcella Solimeo, won.

After a brief hiatus from the music industry, Cruise announced in 2019 that he had renewed his recording contract with David Gresham Records and had started work on his third studio album. Following the global and unprecedented upheaval caused by the COVID-19 pandemic, Cruise released Confluence, a greatest hits album with five new songs including "All Summer Long" and "Take Me To The River" – receiving critical acclaim.

== Personal life ==
Cruise was born and raised in Johannesburg, South Africa. He completed training in Classical Piano through Trinity College, London while still in high school. He studied Psychology, Sociology, and Law at the University of the Witwatersrand, Johannesburg and he then studied Theology at the Baptist Theological College of Southern Africa.

After relocating to the United States of America in 2015, following his signing with Epic Records, Cruise met Sarah Dunham in New York City. The two married in September 2016 in a very intimate ceremony at New York City Hall. The couple celebrated their marriage again almost a year later, in August 2017, at a wedding ceremony held in South Africa. The ceremony and reception, which featured a performance by Cruise for his wife, was broadcast on an episode of a premiere South African lifestyle show, Top Billing.

In March 2019, Connell and Sarah publicly announced the December birth of their son, Ivor Wright Kingsburgh.

== Career ==
In 2010, Cruise auditioned for the sixth season of Idols South Africa and made it to the Top 16. Following his experience on the show, he began a career in gospel music as a performer and songwriter. He featured on Integrity Music compilation albums and participated in the founding of South African contemporary gospel group We Will Worship, before being discovered and signed as a solo artist and songwriter by David Gresham Records in 2012.

His 2013 debut album with David Gresham Records was well received in South Africa, earning Cruise three South African Music Awards nominations and giving him his first number one charted South Africa radio single "Not Just Friends." Work began immediately on a follow up album and Cruise collaborated with songwriters in New York City, such as Ido Zmishlany, through video calls from South Africa. His 2014 single, "Into The Wild," debuted at number one on the South African iTunes singles chart and caused a social media frenzy on Twitter, which caught the attention of American music executive L.A Reid.

In 2014, Reid signed Cruise to Epic Records, a division of Sony Music, in what is widely regarded to be the largest and most significant record deal in South African music history. Cruise followed up his move to the United States by releasing his international debut Into The Wild EP in 2015 through Island Records and spent most of 2015 and 2016 touring extensively around the United States and South Africa. He also worked in studio with acclaimed producers and songwriters John Ryan, Teddy Geiger, Ido Zmishlany, and Scott Harris.

In 2016 Cruise performed with The Fray, Adam Lambert, SafetySuit, and The American Authors in venues across the United States such as The Troubadour in Los Angeles, and the Billboard Lounge in New York City. Cruise took the stage at the Firefly Music Festival and the Bonnaroo Music Festival and was invited to perform at a gala celebration of Harry Belafonte in Greenwich, Connecticut.

In 2017, Cruise released his sophomore studio album, Barely Breathing. The album debuted at number one on the South African iTunes album chart and would go on to earn him his fifth South African Music Award nomination. The lead single from the album, "All Day" topped the South African radio charts. Cruise was invited to be a mentor on the second season of The Voice South Africa, and performed "All Day" live on the show.

In 2018, Cruise was one of 12 South African celebrities chosen to compete in the first season of Dancing with the Stars South Africa. He was partnered with Latin dance champion, Marcella Solimeo. After topping the leaderboard throughout the competition, Cruise and Solimeo bounced back from their first and only dance-off in the semifinal to win the show and take home the mirrorball trophy. The Twitter hashtag, #TeamCruiseControl, became a rallying point for Cruise's fans and supporters throughout the season, dominating much of the television show's social media presence.

Several of Cruise's songs have been featured in international synchronizations during his career. "Endless Possibilities," an exclusive release for the United States of America, was selected by Pepsi Co. for their North American Quaker Oats television commercial campaign and "Into The Wild" featured in the international trailers of the animated feature films "Robinson Crusoe" (2016), and "Missing Link." (2019). Also in 2019, "All Day" was selected as the theme song for the first season of The Bachelor South Africa. Cruise performed a live version of the song on the season finale. Later in 2019, Cruise was invited to participate in the opening performance of the 25th South African Music Awards where he performed "All Day" as part of a showcase that displayed and honored South African music industry legends.

In 2019, after taking a brief hiatus from the music industry to start a family with his wife, Sarah, Cruise announced that he had renewed his recording contract with David Gresham Records and had begun to record his third studio album. Confluence, his third studio album, was released in 2020 in the midst of the COVID-19 pandemic to critical acclaim. Described as a project where all of his "ideas, creativity, and work converge, making way for something more" the album includes his latest hit singles "All Summer Long" and "Take Me To The River."

== Discography ==
South African singer and songwriter Connell Cruise has released three studio albums, one reissue album, two extended plays and eighteen singles.

=== Albums ===
List of Studio Albums
Title	Album details
Connell Cruise	Released: 2013; Label: David Gresham Records; Formats: CD, Digital Download, Stream
Barely Breathing	Released: 2017; Label: David Gresham Records; Formats: CD, Digital Download, Stream
Confluence	Released: 2020; Label: David Gresham Records; Formats: Digital Download, Stream

List of Reissue Albums
Title	Album details
Connell Cruise [Deluxe Edition]	Released: 2013; Label: David Gresham Records; Formats: Digital Download

=== Extended plays ===
List of Extended Plays
Titles	EP Details
Connell Cruise EP	Released: 2013; Label: David Gresham Records; Formats: Digital Download
Into The Wild EP	Released: 2015; Label: David Gresham Records, Island Records; Formats: CD, Digital Download

=== Singles ===
List of Singles, Year Released and Album Name
Title	Year	Album
"Not Just Friends"	2013	Connell Cruise
"Just For Christmas"	2013	Connell Cruise [Deluxe Edition]
"99%"	2014	Connell Cruise [Deluxe Edition]
"Oughta Tell You"	2014	Connell Cruise [Deluxe Edition]
"Wake Me Up"	2014	Connell Cruise [Deluxe Edition]
"Into The Wild"	2014	Into The Wild EP
"Forever"	2014	Into The Wild EP
"Unbelievable"	2015	Into The Wild EP
"Meet Your Mother"	2015	Into The Wild EP
"I Am Your Man"	2016	Into The Wild EP
"Let It Go"	2016	Into The Wild EP
"Congratulations"	2016	Barely Breathing
"All Day"	2017	Barely Breathing
"Wreckage"	2017	Barely Breathing
"Broken Dreams"	2017	Barely Breathing
"All Summer Long"	2019	Confluence
"Damaged People"	2020	Confluence
"Take Me To The River"	2020	Confluence

=== Featured Artist ===
List of Albums as Featured Artist
Title	Album details
We Will Worship: The MoveMeant Begins	Released: 2013; Associated: We Will Worship; Formats: CD, Digital Download
Now That's What I Call Music 56	Released: 2015; Labels: Universal, Sony; Formats: CD, Digital Download
Love Is Calling	Released: 2013; Associated: Gracepoint; Formats: CD, Digital Download

List of Singles as Featured Artist, Year Released and Album Name
Title	Year	Album
"City of God" (We Will Worship featuring Connell Cruise and Kabelo Mabalane)	2012	We Will Worship: The MoveMeant Begins
"The Prayer" (Audrey Mbuyazi featuring Connell Cruise)	2012	Audrey: Take My Life
"Miracle" (DJ Dekstir featuring Connell Cruise)	2017	Miracle
"Give Me Some" (Mark Stent featuring Connell Cruise)	2017	Switch
"Somlandela (Love Is Calling)" (Gracepoint Worship Music featuring Connell Cruise)	2017	Love Is Calling

== Filmography ==
Television
Year	Title	Season	Role	Network	Notes
2012	South African Music Awards	17	We Will Worship	SABC 1	Performed "Malibongwe"
2017	The Voice South Africa	2	Himself	M-net	Guest Mentor & Performed "All Day"
2018	Dancing with the Stars South Africa	1	Himself (Celebrity Contestant)	M-net	Winner
2019	South African Music Awards	25	Himself	SABC 1	Performed "All Day"
2019	The Bachelor South Africa	1	Himself	M-net	Performed "All Day"

== Theatre ==
Year	Production	Role	Location	Notes
2017	The Gospel Spectacular	Himself (Headline with Mahalia Buchanan and Brian Temba)	The Joburg Theatre (Johannesburg, South Africa)	Staged in the Mandela Auditorium (13–23 April)

== Awards ==
Year	Award	Category	Result
2011	MetroFM Music Award	Best Urban Gospel Album for We Will Worship: The MoveMeant Begins	Won
2012	Crown Gospel Award	Best Gospel Newcomer	Won
2012	Crown Gospel Award	Best Contemporary Album for We Will Worship: The MoveMeant Begins	Nominated
2012	South African Music Award	Best Contemporary Faith Album for We Will Worship: The MoveMeant Begins	Nominated
2014	South African Music Award	Best Adult Contemporary Album for Connell Cruise	Nominated
2014	South African Music Award	Male Artist of the Year	Nominated
2014	South African Music Award	Record of the Year for "Not Just Friends"	Nominated
2018	South African Music Award	Best Pop Album for Barely Breathing	Nominated
