= Mandla Gaduka =

South African actor

- Born: Mandla Gaduka; Mahikeng, South Africa
- Occupation: Actor
- Years active: 2004–present
- Height: 160 cm (5 ft 3 in)

Mandla Gaduka is a South African actor. He is best known for the roles in the television soap operas Gauteng Maboneng and Generations.

== Personal life ==
Gaduka was born and raised in Mahikeng, South Africa.

== Career ==
In 2002, he started acting career at the Mmabana Cultural Center. During this time, he completed a Full time Drama course. After the course, he moved to Pretoria and joined with The South African State Theatre Development, where he got the opportunity to study under the Mpumelelo Paul Grootboom. He acted in many stage play wrote and directed by Grootboom such as: Cards, and Relativity. In 2006, he went United Kingdom for a 3-months tour and played at a number of festivals. Meanwhile, he performed in the play Sarafina directed by Mbongeni Ngema. Then he involved Shakespearean play Romeo and Juliet directed by Clare Stepford, by playing the role of "Paris", and later played as "Brutus" in the play Julius Caesar directed by Clara Vaughn.

In 2009, he made his film debut with the critically acclaimed scifi thriller District 9 directed by Neill Blomkamp. In 2010, he joined with the SABC1 television sitcom Gauteng Maboneng and played the role "Solomon". His role became very popular among the public, where he later won the SAFTA Golden Horn Best Actor Award in TV Comedy for both 2016 and 2018 at the South African Film and Television Awards (SAFTA). In 2011, he contested on the SABC1 reality competition Dance Your Butt Off. Then in 2014, he joined with the telenovela Ashes to Ashes and played the role "Damian". For that role, he won the Best Supporting Actor Award for TV Soap category in 2017 SAFTA. When the channel commissioned a new e.tv telenovela, Gaduka offered the opportunity to continue with his character on the new show Broken Vows where he was nominated again for Best Supporting Actor award for TV Soap category in 2018.

In 2011, he joined the cast of popular television soapie Generations with the role "Choppa". In 2015, he made a cameo role in the Hollywood all-time blockbuster Avengers: Age of Ultron. In 2018, he returned to The Market Theatre and performed in the stage play My Hole, My Home directed by Phala O Phala. Then in 2019, joined with a Danish Independent Theatre Production Company, caleed "Fix & Foxy" and appeared in a collaborative show between the Danish Company and 7 South African Actors known as Dark Noon. The show later won the Reumert Special Prize in 2020.

== Filmography ==
Year	Film	Role	Genre	Ref.
2009	District 9	Fundiswa Mhlanga	Film	
2010	Gauteng Maboneng	Solomon	TV series	
2010	Hillside	Eddie Malapo	TV series	
2011	Machine Gun Preacher	SPLA Soldier	Film	
2011	Generations	Choppa	TV series	
2014	Ashes to Ashes	Damian	TV series	
2015	Avengers: Age of Ultron	Johannesburg Onlooker	Film	
2017	Broken Vows	Damian	TV series	
2019	Losing Lerato	Constable Xaba	Film	
2020	Isithembiso	David Maxhosa	TV series	
