= Toaster (disambiguation) =

A toaster is a device used to make toasted bread.

Toaster, or The Toaster, may also refer to these:

== Technology ==
- Video Toaster, a live video-production suite from NewTek used on Amiga
- EMD AEM-7, an electric railroad locomotive commonly nicknamed Toaster
- Toaster, in Microsoft codename jargon, a hardware equivalent of fictional entities used in documentation and sample code as placeholders to be redefined by third-party developers

== Other uses ==
- Toaster (film), 2025 film by Vivek Das Chaudhary
- The Toaster (film), 1982 Canadian comedy short film
- The Toasters, a ska band
- Cylon (Battlestar Galactica), fictional characters in Battlestar Galactica referred to as "Toasters"
- Bennelong Apartments, in Sydney, Australia, colloquial name "The Toaster" or "Toaster building"
- Electronic organ, sometimes referred to as a toaster
- The Toaster, a character in The Brave Little Toaster (novel), a children's book
- Toaster Nsabata, a Zambian football goalkeeper

== See also ==
- Toasting, talking or chanting over a rhythm or beat by a deejay (Jamaican)
- Toast (disambiguation)
- Towcester, a place in Northamptonshire, England.
- Poe Toaster, a mysterious figure who pays an annual tribute to American author Edgar Allan Poe
