= Brenda Ngxoli =

South African actress

- Born: Bongiwe Brenda Ngxoli; 3 July 1981 (age 45); Eastern Cape, South Africa
- Education: University of Cape Town
- Occupations: Actress, Model, Dancer, Director
- Years active: 2000–present
- Known for: Home Affairs, The Queen, Ses'Top La

Bongiwe Brenda Ngxoli (born 3 July 1981) is a South African actress, model, dancer and director. She is best known for her roles in the television serials; Home Affairs, Ses' Top La and Hustle.

== Personal life ==
Ngxoli was born on 3 July 1981 in Eastern Cape, South Africa. She grew up in Kalk Bay, a suburb of Cape Town. In 1997, she matriculated in Muizenberg. Then in 2000, she graduated with her BA degree in Theatre and Performers Diploma in Speech and Drama from the University of Cape Town.

From 2013 onwards, she took seven-year sabbatical and left Johannesburg to start a farm in the Eastern Cape.

== Career ==
She started acting in theatre, where she performed in several stage plays such as, Pick Ups, I-Klips, Yes Medem, Docs Wife, and Sacred Thorns. After that, she appeared in the commercials, "Polka" and "MTN". In 2004, she directed the stage play Through Thick and Thin at the Market Theatre. Then she appeared in the show Strictly Come Dancing in 2008 as the only celebrity dancer who made it to season four together with her partner Quintus Jansen.

In 2005, she made her television debut with the SABC1 drama series Home Affairs. In the series, she played the role of "Vuyo Radebe" for three years with huge popularity. In the meantime, she was nominated for SAFTA Golden Horn for Best Actress in TV Drama category in three years: 2006, 2007 and 2011 at the South African Film and Television Awards (SAFTA). In 2007, she was again nominated for the award for Best Performance by an Actress at the 35th International Emmy Awards.

In 2010, she made her film debut with the first film of the Spud franchise with the role of "Innocence". She continued to play the role for all three films: Spud (2010), Spud 2: The Madness Continues (2013) and Spud 3: Learning to Fly (2014). In 2013, she appeared in the television serial Rockville. She won the Best Supporting Actress Award in TV Drama category at the SAFTA in 2015 where she made nominations for the same award at the SAFTA in 2016 as well. In 2014, she acted in the serial Ses' Top La and won nominations for Best Supporting Actress in TV Comedy category at SAFTA 2016. In 2017, she made the lead role in the e.tv drama serial Hustle and nominated for the Best Actress Award in TV Drama category at SAFTA 2017.

After several critics acclaimed her roles, she joined with the soapie iThemba in 2019, by playing the role of "Nomonde". At the SAFTA 2020, she won the Best Supporting Actress Award in TV Drama category for that role. After her seven-year sabbatical, she joined with the Mzansi Magic telenovela Queen in 2020, the first telenovela in her career. In the serial, she plays the role of "NomaPrincess “Noma” Matshikiza". However, she received negative response from the fans and critics for the role.

== Filmography ==
Year	Film	Role	Genre	Ref.
2005	Home Affairs	Vuyo Radebe	TV series	
2006	Tsha tsha	Mimi	TV series	
2008	Dirt	Nonks	TV movie	
2009	The No. 1 Ladies' Detective Agency	Florence Peko	TV series	
2010	Spud	Innocence	Film	
2011	Lucky	Lindiwe	Film	
2013	Spud 2: The Madness Continues	Innocence	Film	
2014	Spud 3: Learning to Fly	Innocence	Film	
2014	Rockville	Florence Peko	TV series	
2015	Ses' Top La	Pinky	Film	
2016	Hustle	Kitt Khambule	TV series	
2018	Sew the Winter to My Skin	Mole	Film	
2018	The River	Dambisa Dikana	TV Series	
2019	iThemba	Nomonde	Film	
2020	The Queen	NomaPrincess "Noma" Matshikiza	TV series	
