= EMovies =

South African satellite TV channel

eMovies
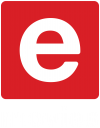
- Current logo used since 2019
- Country: South Africa
- Network: e.tv

Programming
- Languages: English; Afrikaans; Nguni; Sotho
- Picture format: 16:9 (576i SDTV), 16:9 (1080i HDTV)

Ownership
- Owner: eMedia Investments
- Sister channels: eToonz eExtra e.tv eNCA eReality eSERIES ePlesier; News and Sports eXplore

History
- Launched: 16 October 2013; 12 years ago
- Replaced by: KIX (on DStv); Movie Room (on DStv)

Availability

Terrestrial
- OpenView HD: Channel 106
- DStv: Channel 138

eMovies Extra
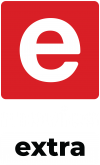
- Current logo used since 2020

Programming
- Language: English

Ownership
- Owner: eMedia Holdings

History
- Launched: 14 October 2016; 9 years ago

Availability

Terrestrial
- OpenView HD: Channel 107
- DStv: Channel 140

eMovies is a 24-hour South African digital satellite television free-to-air movie channel created and owned by eMedia Investment's e.tv for the Openview platform. eMovies Extra is a sister companion channel.

== History ==
The network launched on 16 October 2013, with a second "Extra" channel launched in 2016 via OpenView. Both networks were added on 17 May 2017 on DStv, along with the rest of the e.tv family of networks.

Both channels were going to be removed from DStv along with eExtra and eToonz on April 1, 2022 but the channels remained on DStv for another 2 months as the eMedia Investments filed an application to the Competition Tribunal regarding their carriage agreement with MultiChoice.

By the end of May 2022, eMovies and eMovies Extra ceased transmission on DStv alongside eToonz and eExtra. The channel was supplemented by KIX and upcoming movie channel titled Movie Room.

In August 2022, eExtra alongside eMovies, eMovies Extra and eToonz were reinstated on the DStv platform for another 6 months following pending investigation.

By the end of August 2024, eMedia Investments and MultiChoice managed to settle their dispute regarding the channels.
