= Gidani =

The Gidani consortium was the operator of the South African National Lottery, the most popular form of gambling in South Africa by transaction volume and value.

Gidani was selected to take over operation of the lottery after the seven-year contract of Uthingo, the first operator, expired on 31 March 2007. However, following legal challenges about the award of the licence the lottery was suspended until October 2007.

The Greek lottery operator Intralot was the technical partner to the group. Other shareholders included The Women’s Development Foundation, Vunani Capital, Partnership Investments, Nozala Investments and the Mabindu Development Trust.
