= Petronella Tshuma =

Zimbabwean-born South African actress (born 1990)

- Born: Petronella Nontsikelelo Tshuma; 13 January 1990 (age 35)
- Occupation: Actress
- Children: 2

Petronella Tshuma (born 13 January 1990) is a South African actress. She won Most Promising Actor at the 10th Africa Movie Academy Awards. She also received a Golden horn best actress in a leading role nomination for her role in Of Good Report.

She has featured in several South-African television series including Scandal, Hustle, Mzansi Love, Sokhulu & Partners and 90 Plein Street. She currently plays the character of Pearl Genaro on etv's Rhythm City.

== Early life ==
Tshuma was born in Botswana and moved to South Africa at the age of five. It was at church in downtown Johannesburg in 1997 that she fell in love with acting, landing her first role in a nativity stage play. As her love for story telling grew, she began to perform in school plays and in the local Yeovill, Hillbrow and Berea area.

In 2001, Petronella moved to the United Kingdom to live with her father in Bristol. She attended Filton High School where she continued to pursue drama, playing Carmen in a production of Fame and received a BTECH in Acting from the school's SWADA department.
