= Dancing with the Stars (South African TV series) =

- Genre: Reality competition
- Based on: Strictly Come Dancing
- Presented by: Tracey Lange; Chris Jaftha
- Judges: Tebogo Kgobokoe; Bryan Watson; Debbie Turner; Jason Gilkison
- Country of origin: South Africa
- Original languages: English; Afrikaans isiZulu
- No. of seasons: 1

Production
- Production company: Rapid Blue

Original release
- Network: M-Net
- Release: 4 February 2018

Dancing with the Stars SA is a South African dance competition television series that premiered on 4 February 2018 on M-Net. The show is the South African version of the British reality TV competition Strictly Come Dancing and is based on the Dancing with the Stars franchise. The show is produced by Rapid Blue and co-hosted by Tracey Lange and Chris Jaftha.

The format of the show consists of 6 male and 6 female celebrities paired with a professional dancer. Each couple performs predetermined dances and competes against the others for judges' points and audience votes. The couple receiving the lowest combined total of judges' points and audience votes is eliminated each week until only the champion dance pair remains.

== Cast ==
=== Hosts ===
- Chris Jaftha
- Tracey Lange

=== Judges ===
- Jason Gilkison
- Tebogo Kgobokoe
- Debbie Turner
- Bryan Watson

=== Winner ===
- 2018: Connell Cruise

== Stars ==
=== Season One ===
Season One
Celebrity	Notability (known for)	Professional Partner	Status
Ebenhaezer Dibakwane	Comedian	Nombulelo Hlathi	Eliminated 1st on 18 February 2018
Thembisa Mdoda	Sister of Anele Mdoda, TV presenter & actress	Devon Snell	Eliminated 2nd on 25 February 2018
Odessa Swarts	Sprinter & mother of Wayde van Niekerk	Dylon Daniels	Eliminated 3rd on 4 March 2018
Thando Manana	Former Springbok player	Michelle Oppenshaw	Eliminated 4th on 11 March 2018
Delron Buckley	Former Bafana Bafana footballer	Angelique Allison	Eliminated 5th on 18 March 2018
Juanita de Villiers	Theatre & movie actress	Johan Dippenaar	Eliminated 6th on 25 March 2018
Liesl Laurie	Miss South Africa 2015	Ryan Hammond	Eliminated 7th on 1 April 2018
QUARTER-FINALS
Frank Opperman	Actor	Jeanné Swart	Eliminated 8th on 8 April 2018
SEMI-FINALS
Vanes-Mari du Toit	National netball player	Johannes Radebe	Eliminated 9th on 15 April 2018
FINALS
Eden Classens	Suidooster actor and model	Ash-Leigh Hunter	Runner-up on 22 April 2018
Zola Nombona	Actress	Tebogo Mashilo	Runner-up on 22 April 2018
Connell Cruise	Singer-Songwriter	Marcella Solimeo	Winner on 22 April 2018

== Scoring and voting ==
Every dance is scored out of 40 by the four Judges (each judge contributing a score out of 10) and these Judge's scores create the official ranking of the contestants for the week. Pre-registered voters cast their vote during the live show for their favorite couple (a maximum of 100 votes on the website platform and 100 votes on the mobile platform; a total of 200 votes per registered voter). The ranking determined by the judges gives each position on the leaderboard assigned points. With 11 contestants the system works as follows; first place is awarded 11 points, second place is awarded 10 points, third place is awarded 9 points and so on until eleventh place which is awarded 1 point. The public vote is tallied at the end of the Live Show and a ranking is determined based on those votes. Once again, this ranking assigns points based on position. With 11 contestants the system works as follows; first position is awarded 11 points, second position is awarded 10 points, third position is awarded 9 points and so on until eleventh position which is awarded 1 point. For each contestant the points earned by the Judge's ranking and points earned by the public votes are added to create a final score and the couple with the lowest combined score is eliminated.

=== Scoring charts ===
Couple	Place	1+2	3	4	5	6	7	8	9		10 - Quarter-Finals		11 - Semi-Finals		12 - Final	
Couple	Place	1+2	3	4	5	6	7	(30)	1	240	1	2	1	2	1	2
Connell & Marcella	1	25	29	25	32	33	39	28	33	6	36	34	34	37	40	39
Eden & Ash-Leigh	2	24	15	26	30	28	28	25	38	5	27	30	33	38	39	40
Zola & Tebogo	2	27	20	28	28	25	34	N/A	32	4	29	28	40	34	40	39
Vanes-Mari & Johannes	4	26	18	25	22	31	25	23	30	2	38	30	29	32		
Frank & Jeanné	5	20	21	18	18	24	23	16	28	1	23	26				
Liesl & Ryan	6	20	18	24	22	28	28	18	27	3						
Juanita & Johan	7	21	21	24	31	35	29	22								
Delron & Angelique	8	18	17	19	26	27	21									
Tando & Michelle	9	17	20	23	20	21										
Odessa & Dylon	10	20	21	19	19											
Thembisa & Devomn	11	21	21	23												
Ebenhaezer & Nombulelo	12	23	15													

Red numbers indicate the lowest score for each week
Green numbers indicate the highest score for each week
the couple eliminated that week
the winning couple
the runner-up couple

=== Average Score Chart ===
Rank by average	Place	Couple	Total Points	Number of Dances	Average
1	1	Connell & Marcella	470	15	82.8
2	2	Zola & Tobogo	408	14	74.6
3	2	Eden & Ash-Leigh	426	15	73.9
4	7	Juanita & Johan	183	7	68
5	4	Vanes-Mari & Johannes	331	13	67.5
6	6	Liesl & Ryan	188	9	59.4
7	5	Frank & Jeanné	218	11	54.2
8	11	Thembisa & Devomn	65	3	54.2
9	8	Delron & Angelique	128	6	53.3
10	9	Tando & Michelle	101	5	50.5
11	10	Odessa & Dylon	79	4	49.4
12	12	Ebenhaezer & Nombulelo	38	2	47.5

== Times and reception ==
The show airs on M-Net on a Sunday at 17:00 to 19:00 and the Live Results Show takes place after M-Net's flagship Investigative show Carte Blanche from 20:00 to 20:30.
