= Katch It With Khanyi =

- Genre: Talk show
- Presented by: Khanyi Mbau
- Country of origin: South Africa
- Original language: English
- No. of seasons: 3
- No. of episodes: 91 (list of episodes)

Production
- Executive producers: Anton Burggraf; Sivan Pillay
- Camera setup: Multiple
- Running time: 24 minutes (Season 1-3)
- Production company: Endemol

Original release
- Network: E.tv
- Release: September 15, 2014 – 2016

Katch It With Khanyi was a South African television talk show produced by Endemol Africa and hosted by Khanyi Mbau where she interviewed South African celebrities, including politicians, footballers and artists.

Before the season finale of season 1, the show was renewed for a second season and production was ongoing. The show was scheduled to screen 26 episodes in its second season. Season 1 was filmed from her kasi studio at the Nambitha Restaurant on Soweto's Vilakazi Street. For season 2, the show and production have been at Orlando Stadium.

Season 3 premiered on 20 April 2015 on E.tv. In the first episode, Mbau interviewed the former First Lady of South Africa, Thobeka Madiba Zuma, about her life, career and relationship with President Jacob Zuma.

== Reception ==
Katch It With Khanyi debuted in September 2014 with a viewership of 785,000, exceeding SABC 2's Motswako by over 30,000 viewers. Motswako's viewership in the same week was 753,000 viewers. According to the South African TV Authority, it was the most watched TV talk show in the country at the end of that month.

In the first week of November 2014, the show's ratings reached 1,669,000 viewers with a difference of 884,000 viewers from the second most watched talk show of that week.

== Awards and nominations ==
Year	Nominated	Award	Result	Ref.
2015	Katch It With Khanyi	South African Film and Television Awards (SAFTA), Best Talk Show	Nominated	
