= South African National Lottery =

- Region: South Africa
- First draw: 11 March 2000
- Operator: Sizekhaya
- Regulated by: National Lotteries Commission
- Highest jackpot: R232,131,750.69 Z M Adam
- Odds of winning jackpot: 20,358,520 to 1 (Lotto, Lotto Plus 1 and Lotto 5 Max); 33,900,160 to 1 (PowerBall & PowerBall XTRA); 376,992 to 1 (Daily Lotto); 531,441 to 1 (Matchplay); 4 to 1 (EAZiWIN)
- Number of games: 8
- Shown on: E.tv, SABC 2
- Website: www.nationallottery.co.za

The National Lottery is operated by Sizekhaya holdings, to whom the licence was awarded in 2026. The lottery is regulated by the National Lottery Commission and was established in 2000.

Lottery tickets may be bought only by people of at least 18 years of age.

In the 2007 fiscal year transaction values totalled R3.972 billion, with an average of five million transactions per week. In the 2012 National lottery generated R4.7 billion in sales of Lotto and Powerball tickets.

Lotto is the most popular type of gambling in South Africa but Powerball has been the faster-growing for last years due to its high payouts.

== History ==
The National Lottery was introduced to South Africa on 11 March 2000. At the time it was run by Uthingo.

After a marketing effort that aimed to reach 80 percent of South African homes directly more than 800,000 tickets were sold in the first day of availability Nearly R70 million worth of tickets were sold in the first three weeks of operation.

In October 2002 operator Uthingo suggested a daily lottery to supplement the weekly draw. The concept, called Keno, was rejected by the trade and industry ministry in March 2003. In November 2003 the Lotto Plus game was launched, acting as a supplementary weekly lottery available on the purchase of a primary lottery ticket, with an entry fee of R1.

In July 2006 the Gidani consortium, featuring Greek company Intralot as a technical partner, was judged the preferred bidder to operate the lottery for seven years starting April 2007. The operating licence was awarded in October 2006. In March 2007 the Pretoria High Court set aside that award on application by incumbent Uthingo, finding that the failure to adequately investigate the shareholders in some bidding consortia left room for conflicts of interest.

Following the final draw by incumbent Uthingo, the lottery was indefinitely suspended in April 2007.

In September the operating licence was awarded to Gidani again. When ticket sales re-opened in October more than 200,000 tickets were sold within the first three hours. Gidani introduced scratch cards, but they were discontinued for several months when they lost their licence to Ithuba.

In 2015, Lotto licences were awarded to ITHUBA. In 2015, two new games were introduced by Ithuba: EAZiWIN, an instant win game consisting of four types of indigenous -inspired games; Morabaraba, Fafi Fortune, 4 Siya Wina and Popa Feela and PowerBall Plus.

In December 2020 the lottery drew the unusual final number sequence "5", "6", "7", "8" and "9" with a powerball number of "10". This caused controversy with members of the public accusing the lottery of corruption or collusion with the 20 winners.

In June 2026, Sizekhaya took the licence of the National Lottery, and made significant changes too.

== Games ==
Nine games operate under the South African National Lottery brand:

=== LOTTO ===
LOTTO, LOTTO PLUS 1 and LOTTO 5 MAX odds
Match	Odds of winning	Prize
3	1 : 71.74	R20 (R10 for PLUS 1 & 5 MAX)
2 and Bonus	1 : 95.65	R30 (R15 for PLUS 1 & 5 MAX)
3 and bonus	1 : 1,028.21	R200 (R100 for PLUS 1 & 5 MAX)
4	1 : 1,370.94	R200 (R100 for PLUS 1 & 5 MAX)
4 and bonus	1 : 30,160.77	R4,000 (R2,000 for PLUS 1 & 5 MAX)
5	1 : 75,401.93	Pari-mutuel 25% (35% for PLUS 1 & 5 MAX)
5 and bonus	1 : 3,393,086.67	Pari-mutuel 15% (20% for PLUS 1 & 5 MAX)
All 6	1 : 20,358,520	Pari-mutuel 60% (45% for PLUS 1 & 5 MAX)

Players buy tickets with their choice of six different numbers between 1 and 52; there is a provision for random numbers to be generated automatically for those who do not wish to choose, known as Quick Pick.

When introduced, the LOTTO jackpot draw required numbers from 1 to 49. Ithuba Holdings increased the number from 49 to 52 on 30 July 2017, and then from 52 to 58 on September 21st 2025. Sizekhaya reduced the number from 58 to 52, from June 3rd 2026.

In the draw, six numbered balls are drawn without replacement from a set of 52 balls numbered from 1 to 52. A further Bonus Ball is also drawn, which affects players who match five, four or three numbers.

Prizes are awarded to players who match at least three of the six drawn numbers, with prizes increasing for matching more of the drawn numbers. All players who match all six drawn numbers win equal shares of the jackpot; the chance of doing so is 1 in 20,358,520. If four, five, or six balls are matched, the relevant prize is divided equally between all who match that many balls. If no player matches all six numbers, the jackpot is added to that of the next Lotto draw—a Rollover.

The entry fee to the LOTTO draw is set at R5.00 per board.

The draw is conducted on Wednesdays and Saturdays on SABC 1 & SABC 2 at 21:00 Central Africa Time (CAT).

==== LOTTO PLUS 1 ====
LOTTO PLUS 1 is exactly the same as LOTTO, but gives the player a second chance to win. When buying a LOTTO ticket, the player must pay an extra R2.50 per board to enter the LOTTO PLUS 1 draw. Odds are the same, while prizes are usually slightly lower.

LOTTO PLUS was introduced on 26 November 2003.

The draw is conducted on Wednesdays and Saturdays on SABC 1 & SABC 2 at 21:00 Central Africa Time (CAT), right after the LOTTO draw.

==== LOTTO 5 MAX (previously as LOTTO PLUS 2) ====
LOTTO 5 MAX is exactly the same as LOTTO, but gives the player a third chance to win. When buying a LOTTO ticket, the player must pay an extra R2.50 per board to enter the LOTTO 5 MAX draw. Odds are the same, while prizes are usually slightly lower.

LOTTO 5 MAX was introduced originally as LOTTO PLUS 2 on 30 July 2017, by ITHUBA.

The draw is conducted on Wednesdays and Saturdays on SABC 1 & SABC 2 at 21:00 Central Africa Time (CAT), right after the LOTTO PLUS 1 draw.

=== PowerBall ===
PowerBall and PowerBall XTRA odds
Match	Odds of winning	% of total winning pool
PowerBall	1 : 27.75	Fixed (R10 for PowerBall/R5 for PowerBall XTRA)
1 ball and PowerBall	1 : 45.51	Fixed (R20 for PowerBall/R10 for PowerBall XTRA)
2 balls and PowerBall	1 : 238.9	Fixed (R100 for PowerBall/R50 for PowerBall XTRA)
3 balls	1 : 228.28	Fixed (R100 for PowerBall/R50 for PowerBall XTRA)
3 balls and PowerBall	1 : 3,424.26	Fixed (R500 for PowerBall/R250 for PowerBall XTRA)
4 balls	1 : 10,044.49	Fixed (R2,000 for PowerBall/R1,000 for PowerBall XTRA)
4 balls and PowerBall	1 : 150,667.38	3%
5 balls	1 : 2,260,010.67	6%
All balls including PowerBall	1 : 33,900,160	91%

When introduced, the PowerBall jackpot draw required players to pick five main numbers from 1 to 45 and one 'PowerBall' number from 1 to 20 for an entry fee of R5 per board. Prizes may be won by matching the main numbers, with matches of the PowerBall number winning higher prizes. The top prize of the game is won by matching all five main numbers as well as the PowerBall. Draws take place on Tuesdays and Fridays on SABC 1 & SABC 2 at 21:00 Central Africa Time (CAT).

After 28 November 2015, odds were changed as more possibilities to win were introduced. Players matching only the Powerball would win money, while before, that ticket would not win anything. In addition, the number of main balls was raised from 45 to 50.

After 2 June 2026, Sizekhaya reduced the number of Powerballs from 20 to 16, giving players more chances to win, along with increasing the entry fee to R10 per board.

The record prize for any Lottery game in South Africa was in PowerBall at R178,955,240.90 on 20 January 2026.

==== PowerBall XTRA (previously as PowerBall PLUS) ====
PowerBall XTRA is exactly the same as PowerBall, but gives the player a second chance to win. When buying a PowerBall ticket, the player must pay an extra R5 per board(originally R2.50) to enter the PowerBall XTRA draw. Odds are the same, while prizes are halved. It was introduced on 28 November 2015 as PowerBall PLUS, by the National Lottery of South Africa in Ithuba's license. After June 2026, Sizekhaya renamed the game as PowerBall XTRA.

Draws take place on Tuesdays and Fridays on SABC 1 & SABC 2 at 21:00 Central Africa Time (CAT), right after the PowerBall draw.

=== Daily LOTTO ===
Players buy tickets with their choice of five different numbers between 1 and 36; Numbers can be selected using a manual or QuickPick selection method at a cost of R3 per board.

There are four prize pools for matching 2, 3, 4 or 5 numbers correctly and if nobody matches 5 balls in a draw, the jackpot rollover to the following draw(previously rolled down to matching 4 numbers).

Dailty Lotto odds
match	Odds of winning	% of total winning pool
5 balls	1: 376,992	35,60%
4 balls	1: 2,432	8,20%
3 balls	1: 81	16,40%
2 balls	1: 7,6	39,80%
1 ball	1: 2,4	0%

The Daily LOTTO was introduced on 10 March 2019 and draws take place every night at 21:00 Central Africa Time (CAT), every single day except Christmas Day.

=== Matchplay 13 (previously as SPORTSTAKE 13) ===
A player can play Matchplay 13 by predicting outcomes of 13 predetermined match fixtures drawn from English and other identified professional soccer fixtures.

For each fixture the player chooses their prediction by marking on the bet slip;

[1] – for a home win

[x] – for a draw

[2] – for a home loss (Away win)

Prize division	Theoretical odds of winning	Pool %
Match 13	1:1,594,323	30%
Match 12	1:62,320	15%
Match 11	1:5110	20%
Match 10	1:697	35%

=== E-Instant (previously as EAZiWIN) ===
As well as tickets for the Draw Games, the National Lottery also sells instant win digital scratch cards. These cards are sold entirely online. Some cards are based on traditional african games, others on sports. As of January 2024, there were 20 different EAZiWIN games. From June 2026, there are just 4 different E-Instant games.

== Discontinued games ==
=== Wina Manje ===
Wina Manje was a scratchcard game that consisted of many types of scratch cards. This was replaced by EAZiWIN in 2015.

=== Raffle ===
South African National Lottery announced that there would be a one-off raffle for Christmas 2016. The draw took place on 30 December 2016. It was officially named "Raffle". Prizes included R1,000, R10,000, R100,000, with the top prize being a Mercedes Benz C200 Cabriolet.

=== PICK 3 ===
This game launched on 3 December 2016. It was a daily game with a top prize of R10,000.

The PICK 3 game was discontinued from 15 March 2019. One can still view the past results of the game until discontinuance, but no further plays can be made for this game mode.

PICK 3 was effectively replaced by the DAILY LOTTO game.

=== Daily LOTTO PLUS ===
This game was launched on September 21st 2025.

Same as Daily Lotto but offered a second chance to win. When buying a Daily Lotto ticket, the player must pay an extra R1.50 per board to enter the Daily LOTTO PLUS draw. Odds are the same, while prizes are usually a bit lower than the main game.

Draws were held Monday-through-Sunday (excluding Christmas Day) at 21:00 (CAT)

The Daily LOTTO PLUS were discontinued, after the National Lottery's license moved to Sizekhaya.

== Record jackpots ==
Below lists the highest 11 jackpots from the National Lottery of South Africa.

Rank	Jackpot	Game	Draw number	Date	Notes
1	R232,131,750.69	PowerBall	965	2019-02-19	Claimed (1 Winner, a man in his 50s)
2	R153,466,150.39	PowerBall Plus	1110	2020-07-10	Claimed (1 Winner, a man who is not a regular player)
3	R145,469,799.30	PowerBall	908	2018-08-03	Claimed (1 Winner, 34-year-old man)
4	R141,343,180.95	PowerBall	1018	2019-08-23	Claimed (1 Winner, 50-year-old man)
5	R135,366,753.00	PowerBall	1089	2020-04-28	Claimed
6	R128,593,394.50	PowerBall	1725	2026-06-02	
7	R121,730,295.90	Powerball	1133	2020-09-29	
8	R114,580,902.70	Powerball	1065	2020-02-04	Claimed (1 Winner who is 35 years of age & the first woman to win a jackpot over 100 million)
9	R114,242,816.50	Powerball	1045	2019-11-26	Claimed (1 Winner, 32-year-old man)
10	R110,000,000	Lotto	1783	2018-01-27	4 Winners won R27.5 million each
11	R102,016,595.00	PowerBall	166	2011-06-03	Claimed (1 Winner, a man in his 20s)
12	R100,000,000,00	Lotto	2461	2024-08-03	
13	R99,068,427.00	PowerBall	32	2010-02-12	Claimed

== Operators ==
Operator	Year begun	Year stopped
Sizekhaya Holdings	2026	Present
Ithuba Holdings	2015	2026
Gidani	2007	2015
Utingo	2000	2007

== Socio-economic impact ==
In June 2003 it was reported that 27 percent of lottery players were unemployed and that 43 percent of players earned less than R2,000 a month. It was also reported that legalised gambling had created 50 673 jobs in 2000, although it may have redirected spendings from other industries.

2006 research found that 82 percent of South Africans played the lottery once a week and that 53 percent of the population did not engage in any other form of gambling. The average player spent R81 per month on the lottery.

== Revenue distribution ==
Under the current operator, Ithuba, 34 percent of revenue is paid to a central charitable distribution fund, up from an initial 28 percent. Six percent of revenue is paid as retail commission, ten percent is retained as operational costs and 48 percent is paid in prizes.

== Controversies ==
=== Corruption ===
In 2020, it was reported by GroundUp that people close to senior executives of the National Lottery, including its chairperson Alfred Nevhutanda, had improperly benefited from the charitable distribution fund. The National Lottery responded by initiating criminal charges against the news organisation and a journalist if the stories were not retracted which the National Lottery lost. The stories of corruption and improper benefit resulted in a government investigation of the National Lottery.

In 2024, GroundUp reported that there was a coordinated attack to oust a newly appointed board. MPs from the ANC and EFF in parliament supported those implicated in previous corruption scandals. The board, led by Commissioner Jodi Scholtz and Barney Pityana, sought to root out corruption in the National Lottery and restore integrity and transparency to the NLC.

== Previous lotteries in South Africa ==
The now-defunct homeland of Ciskei established a lottery in 1984 and operated by Score-A-Lot. In 1991 Score-A-Lot was the first Lottery in Africa to operate Video Lottery Terminals (VLT) in Africa and the first totally cashless operation using smart card technology. After lengthy negotiations with South Africa's "Department of Trade and Industry" (DTI) Score-A-Lot closed in Dec 2001

A lottery was established by decree in the former homeland of Transkei in 1989 and operated by Score-A-Lot. In 1991 Score-A-Lot was the first Lottery in Africa to operate Video Lottery Terminals (VLT) in Africa and the first totally cashless operation using smart card technology. After lengthy negotiations with South Africans "Department of Trade and Industry" (DTI) Score-A-Lot closed in Dec 2001

The Natal Lotto (also referred to as the KZN Lotto) was launched in the KwaZulu-Natal province in 1992. During eight years of operation it raised R869 million and paid R345 million to charities and R448 million in prize money.

== See also ==
- Uthingo
