= The Toasty Show =

- Presented by: Various
- Country of origin: South Africa
- Original language: English

Production
- Running time: 120 minutes
- Production company: Clear

Original release
- Network: e.tv
- Release: 1 May 2000 – 11 September 2001

The Toasty Show is a South African breakfast television programme produced by Clear for e.tv, South Africa's first free-to-air private television channel. It had a short run, starting on 1 May 2000, being influenced by the British format The Big Breakfast. Its last edition aired on the morning of 11 September 2001. Due to the gravity of the September 11 attacks, e.tv cancelled all regular programming and, once some normalcy returned, instead of bringing back the format, it was permanently replaced by eNews Morning Edition, which up until then was the name given to half-hourly updates from the eNews team.

== History and overview ==
In November 1999, e.tv awarded the contract to produce its breakfast show to Times Media Limited and Films2People, costing US$7.5 million. In February 2000, it was revealed that it was inspired by The Big Breakfast, with two of its producers visiting Johannesburg on behalf of Times Media to provide consultancy. The tentative launch date was 1 May 2000.

The Toasty Show was presented by Bill Flynn and Bevan Cullinan.

One of the production companies was renamed Clear during 2000. The company had hired Zimbabwean actress Marian Kunonga, where she was appointed floor manager, a position she held through the show's entire run. It was described as "a triple mix of soapie, sitcom and talk-show", known for its spontaneous actions and the frequent jokes involving presenters and guests. The programme was sold to a mass consumer audience and featured a mix of presenters, most of them young, well-known actors and newcomers. There were some product announcements and competitions which made it cross the line between consumerism and infotainment. Bill Flynn, one of the resident actors, had to toggle between two public images, that of a theatre actor and that of a businessman when such competitions were announced.

The last edition aired on 11 September 2001. Later that day, the attacks prompted e.tv to relay Fox News via Sky News and suspend all regular programmes. The following morning, eNews Morning Edition (formerly the name given to news updates every half-hour, now becoming a two-hour bulletin) took its place and The Toasty Show never returned to the channel again. Morning Edition was, in its turn, replaced by Sunrise on 31 March 2008, however e.tv considers Morning Edition to be a rename of The Toasty Show.

After its cancellation, the crew only became aware from a newspaper report, while one of Clear's staff for The Toasty Show told Mail & Guardian that they were all barred from entering e.tv's premises and were considering suing the channel.
