= Toasty: Ashes of Dusk =

Upcoming video game

- Developer: Pocket Llama
- Publisher: Top Hat Studios
- Director: Justin East
- Programmer: Faulty Functions (pseudonym)
- Artist: Brian Farrar
- Writer: Ivy Jade Weaver
- Composer: Maya Oliveira
- Engine: GameMaker Studio 2
- Platforms: Windows; Xbox Series X/S; PlayStation 5; Nintendo Switch
- Genre: Action role-playing
- Mode: Single-player

Toasty: Ashes of Dusk is an upcoming single-player action role-playing game developed by Pocket Llama and published by Top Hat Studios. The game is set to release for Microsoft Windows, the PlayStation 5, the Nintendo Switch, and the Xbox Series X/S. A demo version of the game was made available in 2021.

== Gameplay ==
Toasty: Ashes of Dusk is an action-adventure RPG where players play as Marshall, the Marshmallow Knight. It features a mix of action, adventure, puzzles, and RPG elements. The gameplay takes a lot of inspiration from games such as The Legend of Zelda: A Link to the Past and The Legend of Zelda: Majora's Mask. The world of the game is immersive and inspired by Final Fantasy VII and Pokémon.

Throughout the game, the player is often rewarded with items to strengthen themselves or solve puzzles. Players will encounter many characters who provide side quests with rewards for the aforementioned items. There are numerous dungeons for players to conquer through combat and solving puzzles, often ending with a large boss battle.

The game will shift between different game genres throughout its course.

== Development ==
The game is being developed by Pocket Llama, an indie game studio founded by Justin East. A preliminary Kickstarter campaign was also started on May 26, 2020, but was canceled on June 28 the same year due to the worsening COVID-19 pandemic. A demo was released on itch.io in 2021. A second and much more successful Kickstarter campaign was later opened on March 28, 2022.

== Reception ==
The game has received positive attention. The second Kickstarter campaign received the official title of "Project We Love" and surpassed its funding goal within 3 hours of launching. Ultimately, it reached more than four times the initial funding goal and reached the top spot on the website's "Magic" category.
