= Uthingo =

First operator of South African National Lottery

Uthingo Management (Pty) Ltd was the first licensed operator of the South African National Lottery from March 2000 to March 2007. Uthingo, which means "Rainbow" in Zulu, was a Black Economic Empowerment-compliant consortium, with 70 percent ownership by South Africans, including black-owned firms, the South African Post Office, and the National Empowerment Fund. The other 30 percent was owned by overseas shareholders were GTech Corporation, Camelot Group, and Tattersalls, which each owned 10 percent. The CEO of Uthingo was Humphrey Khoza, an ordained priest who was also the first black president of the South African Chamber of Business.

Camelot sold its stake in Uthingo in 2005. In 2006, Uthingo lost its bid to renew its licence to Gidani, triggering a protracted legal battle in the Pretoria High Court. Lawyers for Uthingo argued that three members of Gidani were prominent figures in the African National Congress, presenting a conflict of interest. The national lottery was suspended for a seven-month period until the court ultimately upheld Gidani's bid in October 2007.
