= E.tv News & Sport =

South African free-to-air digital satellite television news and sports channel

e.tv News & Sport
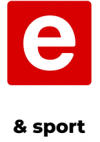
- Final logo used from 2019 to 2022
- Country: South Africa
- Network: e.tv

Programming
- Language: English
- Picture format: 16:9 (576i SDTV), 16:9 (1080i HDTV)

Ownership
- Owner: eMedia Investments
- Sister channels: eToonz eMovies eExtra eMovies Extra e.tv eNCA eReality eSERIES ePlesier eXplore

History
- Launched: 19 November 2018; 7 years ago
- Closed: 31 March 2022; 4 years ago
- Former names: OpenNews (2018–2019)

e.tv News & Sport (also known as eNews and Sport or simply News and Sport) was a South African free-to-air digital satellite television news and sports channel created and owned by e.tv's eMedia Investments. Previously named OpenNews, it was the second news channel created by eMedia, ironically being the rival of its sister channel eNCA.

== History ==
eMedia launched OpenNews as a response to Openview viewers' high demand for a local news channel. Although eMedia already owns a 24-hour eNCA, the channel is exclusively produced for DStv and BBC World News (which is on both platforms) did not satisfy the viewers' needs for local news. The channel was launched at 17:00 CAT and used to broadcast local news from 17:00 CAT to 23:00 CAT Monday to Friday. The broadcasting time was later reserved and now shows local news from 16:00 CAT until 19:30 CAT with the rest of the hours meant for international news partners such as TRT World, China Global Television Network, France 24 and some local documentaries.

On 5 August 2019, the channel, along with the e.tv news bulletins, was renamed e.tv news.

Later that year, the channel started showing Sports and used the e.tv Sport logo before becoming News & Sport. Thereafter the channel was also made available on Viu.

On 22 February 2022, a source named "TV with Thinus" reported that eMedia would shut down e.tv News and Sports by the end of March due to the result that it wasn't viable. eMedia confirmed on its Twitter page on 31 March 2022 that the network shut down at midnight on that day.
