= ENCA =

South African news media division

eNCA
- Country: South Africa
- Broadcast area: Worldwide via eNCA International
- Headquarters: Johannesburg, Gauteng, South Africa

Programming
- Language: English
- Picture format: 16:9 (576i, SDTV)

Ownership
- Owner: eMedia Holdings
- Sister channels: e.tv eToonz eMovies eExtra eMovies Extra eReality eSERIES ePlesier; News and Sports eXplore

History
- Launched: 1 June 2008; 18 years ago
- Former names: eNews Channel (until 19 August 2012)

Links
- Website: enca.com

Availability

Terrestrial
- DStv: Channel 403

eNCA, also known as eNews Channel Africa, is a South African 24-hour television news broadcaster owned by Cape Town-based e.tv. Launched in June 2008, the channel focuses on African stories and events.

eNCA's website launched in May 2013 and passed half a million unique users in September of that year. It had 2.4 million unique users as of February 2017.

== Availability ==
eNCA is available on DStv channel 403.

In August 2012, the channel began testing on the Eutelsat 28A satellite, which is free-to-air across Europe. The channel officially launched in the region when it was added to Sky in the United Kingdom and Ireland on 20 August 2012, and subsequently closed down on 31 October 2014.

== History ==
In 2007, the newly formed e. Sat TV applied for a pay-TV license during the Pay-TV Regulation period. Later that year, they were granted the license along with the already-operating MultiChoice Africa, Telkom SA's media branch Telkom Media, Christian channel Walk on Water, and Digital Media. However, e. Sat TV was the first to give up and said the South African market was only big enough for two operators. They later announced that they would instead work as a channel supplier to the already operating Multichoice DSTV platform.

On 1 June 2008, the channel took to the airwaves at 19h00 for a special edition of its flagship program News Night. Over time, the channel continued expanding the number of shows, presenters, and broadcasting formats to appeal to an increasing viewership.

In 2008, eNCA's former Chief Meteorologist Derek van Dam became the first broadcaster in South Africa to earn the American Meteorological Society's Certified Broadcast Meteorologist (CBM) designation.

On 19 August 2012, the eNews Channel was rebranded as eNCA (eNews Channel Africa) ahead of their launch in the U.K. because they did not want to clash with existing global brands such as E! Entertainment Television. They also wanted a short and simple domain name as they prepared to go online. The channel also received a new logo depicting the continent of Africa.

On 22 November 2015, eNCA published South Africa's first virtual reality news story, reported by Yusuf Omar and produced in conjunction with South African virtual reality company, Deep VR. The 360° video debuted on eNCA's Facebook page and has received more views than any other eNCA video. Following its success, eNCA produced a follow-up virtual reality report on the #ZumaMustFall marches in Johannesburg, which debuted on the eNCA Facebook page on 18 December 2015.

On 16 July 2018, the channel celebrated its 10th anniversary by unveiling new studios, a new look, and new line-ups. The channel also introduced a new weekend lineup on 1 December 2018.

On 29 July 2019, eNCA introduced a new line-up.

== Controversy ==
In 2020, eNCA released a news headline on its social media pages alleging that the President of the Republic of South Africa, Cyril Ramaphosa, was going to address the nation; however, the Presidency denied this and deemed it fake news. In February 2021, eNCA reporter Lindsay Dentlinger was accused of being racist after she forced black political leaders of the UDM and IFP to wear masks to prevent the spread of COVID-19 but allowed their white counterparts of the Democratic Alliance and the pro-Afrikaner Freedom Front Plus to be interviewed without wearing masks.

eNCA has been accused of spreading right-wing propaganda and fake news by the African National Congress and EFF leader Julius Malema.

== See also ==
- Media in South Africa
