= EToonz =

South African children's television channel

eToonz
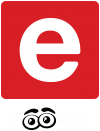
- Current logo on-air since 2019.
- Country: South Africa
- Broadcast area: Sub-Saharan Africa
- Network: e.tv

Programming
- Language: English

Ownership
- Owner: eMedia Investments
- Sister channels: e.tv eMovies eExtra eMovies Extra eReality eSERIES eNCA; News and Sports ePlesier eXplore

History
- Launched: 16 October 2013; 12 years ago
- Replaced by: DreamWorks Channel (on DStv); PBS Kids (on DStv)
- Former names: eToonz+ (2013 - 2017)

Availability

Terrestrial
- OpenView HD: Channel 130
- DStv: Channel 311

eToonz is a South African digital satellite television free-to-air children's channel created and owned by eMedia Investments's e.tv. The channel broadcasts for a duration of 16 hours from Sunday to Friday, 17 hours on Saturday and 18 hours with movies during the school holidays.

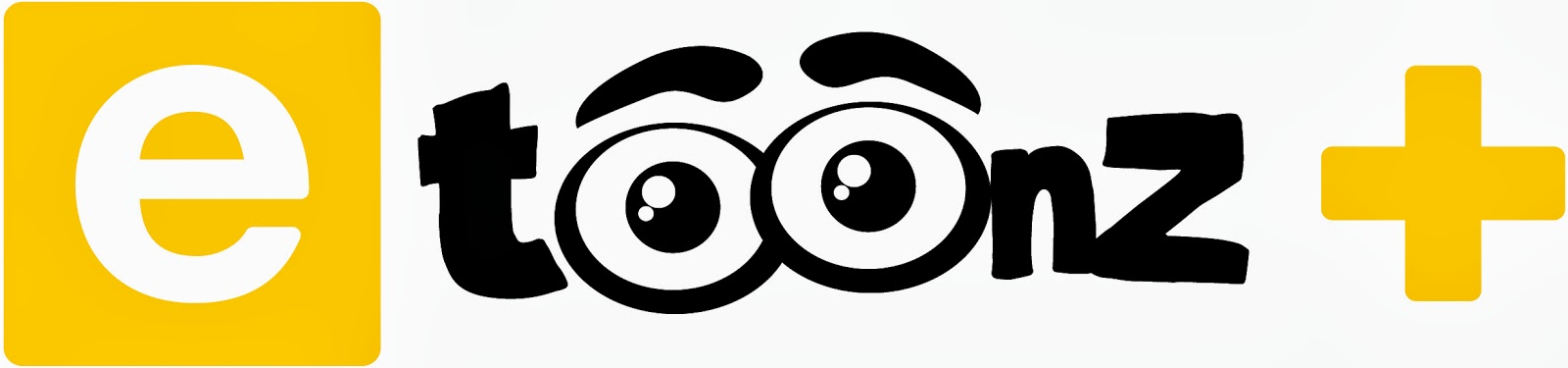
Logo used from 2013 to 2017

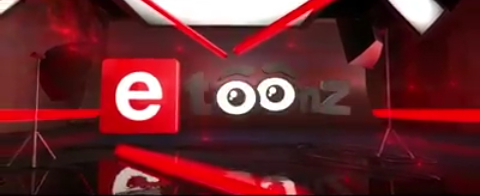
Logo used from 2017 to 2019

== History ==
eToonz started as a 30 to 60 minute segment on the defunct Little e block which featured animated programs such as The Adventures Of Lerato and Alex and Deep & Dylan's Curious Minds - South African produced content.

e.tv as a broadcaster launched eKasi+, eToonz+, eMovies+ and eAfrica+ as new sister channels as the first of its planned set of TV channels for digital terrestrial television (DTT). e.tv, the SABC and M-Net plan to each roll out their own collections of additional TV channels in South Africa eventually.

Since government incompetence and industry infighting has long-delayed the digital switch-over process known as digital migration, e.tv launched its first 4 additional free-to-air TV channels on OpenView HD, although the channels will become publicly available to all viewers once DTT starts.

e.tv, tired, frustrated and becoming increasingly scared over its inability to grow its potential market share and possible diminishing returns on its existing market which could evaporate in the face of ongoing TV channel and audience fragmentation in South Africa, decided to no longer wait for DTT but to forge ahead and start launching its additional channels. as eToonz+ along with eKasi+ (now eExtra), eAfrica+(now defunct) and eMovies+(now eMovies).

At launch, StarSat entered talks with eMedia Investments over the potential of including their channels into their platform before things didn't work out.

In 2017, news leaked that about the channel's possible availability on DStv before being made official on May 17 alongside eMovies, eMovies Extra and eExtra. Later that year, e.tv gave eMovies+ and eToonz+ a reimaging; with digital television established, the "+" symbol imagery was also dropped from those two networks.

eToonz and three other e.tv services were going to be removed from DStv on 1 April 2022 but the channel remained on DStv for another 2 months as the eMedia Investments filed an application to the Competition Tribunal regarding their carriage agreement with MultiChoice.

By the end of May 2022, the channel ceased transmission on the DStv platform alongside eExtra, eMovies and eMovies Extra. The channel was supplemented by PBS Kids and DreamWorks Channel.

In August 2022, eToonz alongside eMovies, eMovies Extra and eExtra were reinstated on the DStv platform for another 6 months following pending investigation.

By the end of August 2024, eMedia Investments and MultiChoice managed to settle their dispute regarding the channels.

== Programming ==
Most of the channel's content comes from the Craz-e block on e.tv. Certain shows that weren't added onto the channel were the blocks former live-action youth shows. eToonz broadcasts wide range of cartoons, from pre-school shows like In the Night Garden..., Peppa Pig and Barbie Dreamhouse Adventures, with other cartoons from DreamWorks Animation like The Boss Baby, Archibald's Next Big Thing, Lego Friends: Girls on a Mission; also anime like the Pokémon animated series and others such as Fireman Sam.

Programmes:

- The Loud House
- SpongeBob SquarePants
- My Little Pony: Friendship is Magic
- Friends: Heartlake Stories
- MasterChef Junior
- Power Rangers
