= EReality =

South African reality television channel

eReality
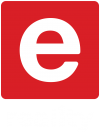
- Country: South Africa
- Network: e.tv

Programming
- Language: English
- Picture format: 16:9 (576i SDTV), 16:9 (1080i HDTV)

Ownership
- Owner: eMedia Investments
- Sister channels: eToonz eMovies eExtra eMovies Extra eSERIES ePlesier e.tv eNCA; News and Sports eXplore

History
- Launched: 19 November 2018; 7 years ago

Availability

Terrestrial
- OpenView HD: Channel 108

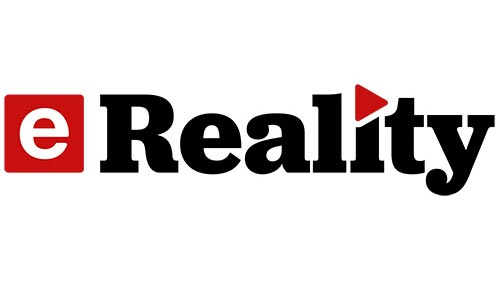
logo used from 2018 to 2019

eReality is a South African reality television channel created and owned by eMedia Investments's e.tv for OpenView. The channel broadcasts 16 hours a day showcasing a mix of local and international nostalgic reality series and shows which never before appeared on e.tv.

eReality is currently the most popular reality channel in South Africa.

== History ==
eMedia Investment researched what viewers preferred the most on e.tv and Openview. The decision was rather than aggregate reality content on the main e.tv channel there should be a new channel, which currently is exclusive to Openview.

Marlon Davids, managing director for the e.tv channels, says reality shows continue to grow in popularity and is thrilled that e.tv has presented this self-packaged channel.

== Programmes ==
eReality's lineup feature real-life stories, fascinating characters and raw human emotion. Most notable titles include MasterChef, Family Feud, The Real Housewives, Little Women franchise, Cheaters, The Planet's Funniest Animals, Forensic Files and Paternity Court. At launch, it showcased new and nostalgic reality entertainment seen before on the main e.tv channel. The channel later introduced new and exclusive reality series, under the programming block named eKasi, on July 10, 2021. SA some of the contewls also added le e.tv's streaming service, on eVOD.

After the closure of e.tv News & Sport, the channel absorbed some of the sporting content in April, such as Impact Wrestling, the Premier League and Formula E.
