= EExtra =

South African digital satellite television channel

eExtra
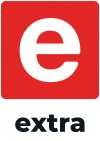
- Current logo on-air since 2019.
- Country: South Africa
- Network: e.tv

Programming
- Languages: English; Afrikaans; Nguni; Sotho
- Picture format: 16:9 (576i SDTV), 16:9 (1080i HDTV)

Ownership
- Owner: eMedia Investments
- Sister channels: eToonz eMovies; News and Sports eMovies Extra e.tv eSERIES eNCA eReality ePlesier eXplore

History
- Launched: 15 October 2013; 12 years ago
- Former names: eKasi+ (2013–2017)

Availability

Terrestrial
- Sentech: Channel depends on nearest repeater
- OpenView HD: Channel 105
- DStv: Channel 195

eExtra is a South African digital satellite television channel owned by eMedia Holdings, offering a variety of lifestyle, dramas, telenovelas, court shows, sitcoms and movies.

== History ==
e.tv as a broadcaster launched eKasi+, eToonz+, eMovies+ and eAfrica+ as new sister channels as the first of its planned set of TV channels for digital terrestrial television (DTT). e.tv, the SABC and M-Net plan to each roll out their own collections of additional TV channels in South Africa eventually.

The networks will eventually be a part of South Africa's digital terrestrial television system, but began airing over OpenView HD while the launch of DTT is coordinated. as eToonz+ along with eKasi+ (now eExtra), eAfrica+ (defunct) and eMovies+ (now eMovies).

eKasi+ was later added to the StarSat platform on 17 December 2015.

The network was rebranded as eExtra was launched on 1 April 2017 on Openview HD and StarSat. It was later added to DStv on 17 May of the same year. In 2021, the eKasi branding was revived as an eReality programme block in June.

On April 1, 2022, eExtra and three other e.tv services were going to be removed from DStv but the channel remained on DStv for another 2 months as the eMedia Investments filed an application to the Competition Tribunal regarding their carriage agreement with MultiChoice.

By the end of May 2022, the channel ceased transmission on the DStv platform alongside eToonz, eExtra, eMovies and eMovies Extra.

In August 2022, eMovies alongside eMovies Extra, eExtra and eToonz were reinstated on the DStv platform for another 6 months following pending investigation.

By the end of August 2024, eMedia Investments and MultiChoice managed to settle their dispute regarding the channels.

== Programming ==
eExtra broadcasts telenovelas, along with a general entertainment schedule of sitcoms, dramas, films, reality and American court shows. The telenovelas are dubbed in English and sourced from domestic Turkish networks, the American Telemundo network, Zee TV, Colors TV, SET India and SBS.

=== Kuiertyd ===
In October 2018, eExtra started an Afrikaans block known as Kuiertyd, which mainly features dubbed Turkish telenovelas and a daily 20:00 news bulletin.

These dubbed Turkish Telenovelas include

1. Gebroke Harte, Bittersoet, Die Vreemdeling, Elif, Wie Laaste Lag, Stiletto Vendetta, Annekan Die Swa Kry, Die Put, Begeertes, Die Wiel Draai, Soomerdhal Moorde, IMPAK!, Dr Ali, #Discomplicated, Voelvry, Blink Kant Bo, Yosef, Deur Dik En Dun, Doodsondes, As Die Skoen Pas, Chrysalis, Fenix, Maanligsprokie, Soud Van Die Aarde, Bloedspoor, Kurt En Shura, Droomverlore

In April 2022, it was announced the brand would get a dedicated channel targeted toward their Turkish offering known as ePlesier.
