= E.tv =

South African free-to-air television station

e.tv
- Country: South Africa
- Broadcast area: Sub-Saharan Africa (as e.tv Africa)
- Headquarters: Cape Town, South Africa

Programming
- Languages: English; Afrikaans; Nguni; Sotho
- Picture format: 1080i HDTV (downscaled to 16:9 576i for the SDTV feed)

Ownership
- Parent: eMedia Holdings
- Sister channels: eToonz eMovies eExtra eMovies Extra eReality eNCA eSERIES ePlesier; News and Sports eXplore

History
- Launched: 1 October 1998; 28 years ago

Links
- Website: www.etv.co.za

Availability

Terrestrial
- Sentech: Channel depends on nearest repeater
- OpenView HD: Channel 104
- GOtv: Channel 120 (eAfrica feed) until 31 March 2022
- DStv: Channel 194
- Zuku TV: Channel 126 (eAfrica feed) until 31 March 2022

e.tv (commonly referred to on-air as e) is the first and only privately owned free-to-air television station in South Africa, and a subsidiary of eMedia Holdings. Founded in 1998, the company broadcasts nationally, and is headquartered in Cape Town.

It is the fifth terrestrial television channel in the country, following three channels that are operated by the state-owned South African Broadcasting Corporation (that is SABC 1, SABC 2 and SABC 3) and the privately owned subscription-funded M-Net.

In 1997, the e.tv channel bought the broadcasting rights to broadcast English Premier League (EPL) matches and, later on, they also bought the rights to broadcast UEFA Champions League matches.

After South Africa's 4 free-to-air SABC channels, e.tv is the most-watched network in the country, according to data from satellite TV provider DStv.

== History ==
Original 3D variant logo since 2013

Midi TV was the consortium that won the broadcasting licence on 30 March 1998 to operate the channel. It is majority-owned by broad-based black economic empowerment (BBBEE) group Hosken Consolidated Investments (via its 80.3% shareholding in subsidiary eMedia Holdings), with Remgro having a minority-stake. Hosken Consolidated Investments' major shareholder is the Southern African Clothing and Textile Workers Union. TimeWarner held 20% of the shares.

Defeated incumbents included Afrimedia (which lacked a foreign partner), Community Television Network (backed by Canadian company UTV International Holdings), Free To Air (backed by British company United News and Media and the Swedish Modern Times Group), New Channel Television (backed by TF1) and Station for Nation (where the Nine Network held 20% of the shares). The station had a tentative launch date of October 1998.

The channel launched on 1 October 1998 with a terrestrial coverage of 60%, though it wouldn't make a formal launch party until the 1998 Sithengi television festival the following month, to an audience of 8,000 guests. The IBA granted license conditions to e.tv: a 24-hour license with 30 minutes of news every day. If the channel didn't meet these conditions, then e.tv wouldn't accept paid advertising.

e.tv was planned to start its 24-hour service on 1 February 1999, with plans to start its news service two weeks earlier on 17 January. At launch, the channel carried the following amount of local programming: 2 half-hour magazine programmes, one hour-long documentary, a half-hour sports roundup, a half-hour children's programme (targeting viewers ages 8 to 12) and an hour-long jazz music programme.

IBA's recommendations suggested that e.tv would increase its local output from the 1 February date to 30%, the minimum recommendation from the regulator, as well as commitments to make co-productions with other African countries. International programming dominated the ratings, such as Friends, which up until then was broadcast exclusively by M-Net.

The channel surpassed the 500,000 viewer mark by February 1999, achieving an 18% total audience growth since launch, and an increase among black viewers of 123%, within the latter two months. The classic movie slot at 11:30am became a hit with daytime viewers.

Shortly before starting its 24-hour schedule, Vula Communications, one of Midi's shareholders, planned to float 20% of its shares at the Johannesburg Stock Exchange during 1999. The overnight slots were given over to new creative talent, with a prospective launch slated for April 1999.

One year into e.tv's existence, the channel was already in trouble over recommendations from the IBA that were barely achieved. The IBA submitted an application in August 1999 to amend the conditions of its licence.

Its South African shareholders (80% of the shares) should be put as one; 40% of its programming, produced in South Africa, would be produced by independent production companies, but, if the plan was altered, wouldn't change its obligations to carry news and current affairs programming, and that the channel should produce content in languages other than English, with e.tv raising doubts about the possibility of entering the Afrikaans market, which at the time was being served by M-Net's KykNET.

e.tv's breakfast contract was awarded in November 1999 to Times Media Limited and Films2People, worth R45 million. The Toasty Show was set to launch on 1 May 2000. Influenced by The Big Breakfast, two of its producers reportedly visited Johannesburg in February 2000 providing consultancy to Times Media.

At Sithengi 99, e.tv announced that it was entering its second phase of operations, and was accepting submissions for a daily magazine show catered to the 9–14 demographic and a weekly show on Sundays (from 8am to 11am) called House of Toons.

Local sitcoms started in April 2000 with Big Okes followed by S.O.S. the following month. In February 2001, two further sitcoms followed, Madam & Eve and Scoop Schoombie.

Sales and managing director Quentin Green left the network for TVAfrica in April 2001.

The consortium has had many changes in ownership, however the dominant player has always been HCI: it had bought out minority black shareholders who had failed to repay loans they used to purchase the Midi TV stake. Warner Bros. sold their 25% shareholding of the channel in 2001, concerned that they would never be able to exercise full ownership: South African media ownership law restricts foreign entities to owning no more than 25% of a television channel.

Marcel Golding, a former trade unionist, was controversially forced to resign as the station's CEO in late October 2014, following the polemic purchase of shares he made in South African electronics equipment maker Ellies. HCI had insisted, in court documents, that the purchase of the R24 million stake in the electronics maker, which also produces digital set-top boxes, was without authorisation. Golding had, challenging his removal as CEO, stated that attempts to get rid of him was due to the ANC government wanting to control the station's news output through direct interference.

== Controversy and milestones ==
In January 2001, controversy arose when e.tv showed floor plans and other blueprints for renovations of Genadendal Residence, the official residence of President Thabo Mbeki, on air. The government responded by threatening legal action, citing that the station contravened The Protection of Information Act. In August, it was reported to be the fastest-growing channel in South Africa.

After the September 11, 2001 attacks, e.tv joined other South African broadcasters in agreeing to continue broadcasting statements by Osama bin Laden. It was also the site of an anthrax scare in October.

In 2002, the Broadcasting Complaints Commission of South Africa exonerated e.tv from overstepping its code of conduct after complaints were received following its screening of series from the Emmanuelle soft-core porn series. In June, it failed in its attempt to stop M-Net from acquiring a new broadcast licence.

In 2004, e.tv was reprimanded by the Advertising Standards Authority, after launching a series of newspaper advertisements, in which the SABC was purported to be a "state broadcaster" and "lacking editorial independence." In October, the channel failed in its bid to force the court to allow a live broadcast of the proceedings of the Schabir Shaik trial. In November, it was reported that Midi TV owed ICASA R7 million in licence fees.

In 2005, the channel was fined R55 000 for two offences of broadcasting 18-rated movies before 9pm. It was also prevented by a court ruling, which prevented it from airing a documentary concerning a prominent baby murder, but upon appeal, e.tv was ordered to show the documentary to the case's prosecutors for review.

The station also fired prominent personality, Soli Philander, after a year's involvement. It also garnered controversy from conservative and religious groups, after it decided to broadcast softcore pornography late at night over the weekends.

In 2006, it refused to air a controversial interview with P.W. Botha before his 90th birthday, which both the SABC and M-Net refused as well. They also received 14 complaints after a contestant was injured in an episode of the local Fear Factor; the station retorted, saying they "gave fair warning" to participants prior to the show, which was upheld by the BCCSA.

The news reports of e.tv are sometimes critical of the SABC for having "close ties" to the ruling African National Congress. Both print and outdoor campaigns by e.tv imply an inherent bias in the SABC's news coverage. More recently, e.tv joined a coalition of media outlets in a lawsuit to force the courts to allow live audio and/or video feeds to be broadcast from trials involving government officials and other prominent figures.

Because of its liberal policies on adult content and its continual reinforcement of being free-to-air while it broadcast blockbuster movies, e.tv seems to have won the ratings war against SABC, especially on weekends.

=== Milestones ===
In 2003, the channel was awarded a contract from Uthingo to broadcast the National Lottery results live.

Starting in April 2013, the channel launched "e on Demand", a catch-up service that allows registered etv.co.za viewers to watch past episodes of their favorite TV shows as well as watch exclusive content. Many of e.tv's own productions are available to view including its popular weekday soap opera Rhythm City.

Beatlab was made available at the time on the platform.

At launch, StarSat (formerly known as TopTV) had entered negotiations with the brand for their additional channels before proofing to be fruitful and were only fortunate to launch eKasi+ in 2015 as a replacement for BET. Later that year, e.tv was made available in HD on DStv with content added onto Catch-up.

In 2017, eAfrica+ and eKasi+ were replaced with True African and eExtra from April. A month later, news circulated that the brand's 4 channels might be available on DStv before being made official a day before its launch.

In 2018, True African and Beatlab TV were discontinued as part of realignment strategy to offer viewers fresh entertainment. The channel welcomed three additional channels which was their second news channel, OpenNews and their first reality channel, eReality and a female centric channel, eBella. An Afrikaans block known as Kuiertyd launched on eExtra.

In 2019, eBella was reintegrated to eExtra, OpenNews rebranded to e.tv News then e.tv News and Sports and Rewind launched.

In 2021, the brand launched its own streaming service eVOD with some content moving exclusively to that platform alongside upcoming programming that haven't aired on their channels.

In 2022, two more channels were added Xposed to replace Rewind while ePlesier launched as a new channel. On 31 March 2022, eTV Africa stopped airing on DStv and GOtv. In South Africa, e.tv remains on the platform alongside eNCA while eExtra, eMovies, eMovies Extra and eToonz no longer available on the platform until August 2022.

== Programming ==
=== Local productions ===
In early days e.tv had a strong focus on local content. Many of e.tv's original productions received high ratings, beating those of the SABC.

Backstage, set in an arts college in Cape Town, started off on a high note when it first aired in 2000, but things soured when e.tv had a dispute with the production company, and several popular cast members left the show. Because of low ratings to other shows in its time slot, Backstage was cancelled as of the end of June 2007. Backstage was then replaced by "Rhythm City" which was set in the South African music industry.

Scandal!, set in a mass media company in Johannesburg, experienced increased ratings after its timeslot was changed from 8pm to 7.30pm. In its previous timeslot, the soapie clashed with SABC 1's established soapie Generations. In 2015 the channel introduced new dramas such as Ashes to Ashes, Matatiele, Umlilo, Z'bondiwe, Gold Diggers, Traffic, Broken Vows and eKasi:Our Stories, Imbewu: The Seed and Isipho, reality shows like Blame it on Fame, Rolling With, Katch it with Kanyi, Coke Studio Africa, Step Up or Step Out, Reality Check, Nikiwe, Isitha:The Enemy, Smoke And Mirrors, Superdance South Africa and Durban Gen.

=== International content ===
In South Africa, e.tv formerly aired some HBO shows like The Sopranos, Six Feet Under and Curb Your Enthusiasm.

From January 2016, e.tv is the first free-to-air channel in South Africa to air the hit shows and dramas such as Doodsondes, Empire, Devious Maids, How To Get Away With Murder, The Fixer, Chicago and Hawaii Five-O.

In September 2017, Days of Our Lives moved from SABC3 to etv.

The channel also airs America's Funniest Home Videos, Family Feud, Steve Austin's Broken Skull Challenge, Minute to Win It, MTV Fear Factor, Little Big Shots and Judge Judy.

=== Craz-e ===
Craz-e is the children's slot for the channel, airing selected specially curated content. The slot is aired weekdays from 14:30 CAT as a two-hour programming block. Initially it was a separate block for teens, the second one being named Littl-e for preschoolers, until they were merged in 2018. The slot was particularly popular for its local shows: Sistahood, Frenzy, Shiz Live and Craz-e World Live, which were discontinued in 2019.

Littl-e's local offerings such as Cool Catz and Siyabonga Gogo were also discontinued, although reruns still air on eToonz. Craz-e gave rise to new fresh talent such as Zola Hashatsi and Pearl Modiadie.

=== Movies ===
Over the years, e.tv still dominates the weekend ratings war with movies against the SABC, due to having multiple deals with various distribution companies. Some movies first premiere on the e.tv channel before moving on to eMovies or eMovies Extra.

=== Kuiertyd ===
On 15 July 2019 the channel introduced Turkish dramas in their primetime slot with the first being Die Vreemdeling. Thereafter the channel started airing reruns of past and present Turkish dramas from eExtra.

=== Sports ===
e.tv previously secured broadcast rights of the UEFA Champions League and the World Wrestling Entertainment's various shows; which aired on weekdays and weekends, these received the highest ratings in their timeslots. WWE rights are currently held by DStv's Supersport.

As of August 2019, e.tv acquired broadcasting rights of the Premier League. The decision comes after Kwese Free Sports ceased broadcasting on the Openview platform. However, they only broadcast one live match every Saturday on e.tv News instead of e.tv or eExtra. The channel recently signed deal to also broadcast Bundesliga. E.tv also holds domestic rights to the American NBA.

=== eNews ===
In 1998, e.tv launched its very own dedicated news division from Cape Town called "eNews" which went LIVE at 7pm daily. eNews "Morning Edition" which was a morning news bulletin was also broadcast on e.tv at the top of each hour during its iconic breakfast show called the "Toasty Show". After 12 September 2001, "Morning Edition" became a two-hour service.

From the early 2000s, eNews was widely becoming popular for its 7pm daily news bulletin - "eNews Prime Time". Following the need for more rolling coverage on news developments and breaking news, several other bulletins were launched on e.tv;

-eNews Sunrise, which was a cross over from the e.tv breakfast show called "Sunrise". This bulletin featured the mornings news headlines at every 30 minutes between 5:30am and 8am on weekdays.

-Newsday, which was primarily a lunch time news bulletin at 1pm on weekdays. In 2008, following the launch of its sister channel eNCA (then known as the eNews Channel), "Newsday" was simulcast on e.tv at 1pm.

-eNews Prime Time, which was a 7pm news bulletin featuring the days top stories, business news, sport and weather. From 2016 to 2018, eNews Prime Time was re-launched under a more dynamic news bulletin called "eNews Direct" in a new time slot at 8pm on weeknights and at 7pm on weekends.

-eNews Late Edition, which was a late night news bulletin featuring the days top stories, business news, sport and weather at 10pm. The Late Edition news bulletin ended in 2014 and is no longer broadcast on e.tv.

-eNews Early Edition, which was a 5 Minute update on the days news headlines at 6pm on weekends. The Early Edition news Bulletin ended in late 2017 and is no longer broadcast on e.tv.

As of 5 August 2019, e.tv consolidated and combined its 1pm and 8pm bulletins along with the OpenNews channel and renamed the OpenNews channel and eNews bulletins to e.tv News.

Since August 2019, the daily news bulletin was rebranded as "e.tv News" and is presently broadcast at 8pm on weeknights featuring the days top stories, business news, sport and weather. The weekend edition called "South Africa Tonight" features a simulcast at 7pm from e.tv's sister channel eNCA.

In response to the COVID-19 Pandemic in early 2020, e.tv News added a special report at 6:30pm on weeknights featuring breaking news updates and developments on the pandemic.

As of 2022, e.tv no longer broadcasts a lunch time news bulletin at 1pm.

=== Video on demand ===
The Video on demand (VOD) offer of the E.tv is available on several platforms:

- Web: Free VOD has been collected under the E.tv eVOD brand.
- Mobile device: eVOD are available on several South Africa mobile networks.

== Sister channels ==
=== Current channels ===
- eNCA

Also referred to as eNews Channel Africa. A 24-hour television news broadcaster which focuses on both South African and African stories. The broadcaster became the nation's first & most-watched 24-hour news service when it launched in June 2008. e.tv first ever news channel that is available exclusively on DStv.

- eMovies

A movie channel showcasing family friendly movies mixed with dramas and romance.

- eExtra

A general entertainment channel offering a variety of telenovelas as well as other programming.

- eMovies Extra

A second movie channel showing mostly action and thriller movies

- eToonz

A children's channel featuring past and current programs seen on e.tv kids block, Craze.

- eReality

The series features real life stories notable individuals and accounts of personal experiences with an emphasis on human emotion and compelling narratives.

- eSERIES

New sitcoms, drama series and crime series.

- ePlesier

A reruns channel playing Turkish dramas seen on other stations.

=== Former channels ===
- ReWIND

A rerun channel playing content from e.tv and its other set of channels

- News and Sports

A second news and first sports channel from eMedia Investments that launched exclusively on Openview.

- eBella

A female-based channel featuring a mix of reality, lifestyle, and telenovelas.

- Beatlab TV

A music channel offering a mix of local and international hits.

- eNolly+

A pan-African channel displaying content from around Africa.

- Xposed

It covers a range of genres, including lifestyle, food, music, art, and general entertainment. It will also broadcast certain sitcoms and dramas.

- ePowerUP

Don't miss out on your favourite show in the dark during load shedding all repeat and catch-up shows.

== See also ==
- Media in South Africa
- Television in South Africa
