= Trial of Oscar Pistorius =

Criminal trial

The State vs Oscar Pistorius
- Court: Gauteng Division of the High Court of South Africa in Pretoria
- Decided: 12 September 2014
- Transcript: Judgment Appeal Judgment

Case history
- Subsequent action: Pistorius sentenced to 5 years in prison for culpable homicide (later resentenced to 6 then 15 years for murder)
- Related actions: Multichoice (Proprietary) Limited and others v National Prosecuting Authority and another [2014] ZAGPPHC 37, Gauteng Division, Pretoria (South Africa) (broadcasting of proceedings)

Court membership
- Judge sitting: Thokozile Masipa

The trial of Oscar Pistorius for the murder of Reeva Steenkamp and several gun-related charges (The State vs Oscar Pistorius) in the High Court of South Africa in Pretoria opened on 3 March 2014. Pistorius was a leading South African runner who won attention as an athlete with a disability competing at a high level, including at multiple Paralympic Games and the 2012 Summer Olympics. Steenkamp, a model, had been Pistorius's girlfriend for three months. In the early morning of Thursday, 14 February 2013, Steenkamp was shot and killed by Pistorius at his Pretoria home. Pistorius acknowledged that he shot Steenkamp, but he said that he mistook her for an intruder. Pistorius was taken into police custody and was formally charged with murder in a Pretoria court on 15 February 2013. The entire trial was broadcast live via audio, and parts of the trial were also broadcast live via television.

On 11–12 September 2014, judge Thokozile Masipa delivered a verdict that Pistorius was not guilty of murder but guilty of the culpable homicide of Steenkamp and reckless endangerment with a firearm at a restaurant. On 21 October 2014, he was sentenced to a maximum of five years for culpable homicide with a concurrent three-year suspended prison sentence for reckless endangerment.

Pistorius was released on parole on 19 October 2015 after serving one sixth of his sentence. The state appealed the conviction, and in December 2015 the Supreme Court of Appeal overturned the conviction for culpable homicide, finding him guilty of murder instead. On 6 July 2016, Masipa sentenced Pistorius to six years in prison for murder. The state appealed again, this time for a longer sentence. The Supreme Court of Appeal then imposed a sentence of 15 years – with the time he had already served reducing the time to an additional 13 years and five months.

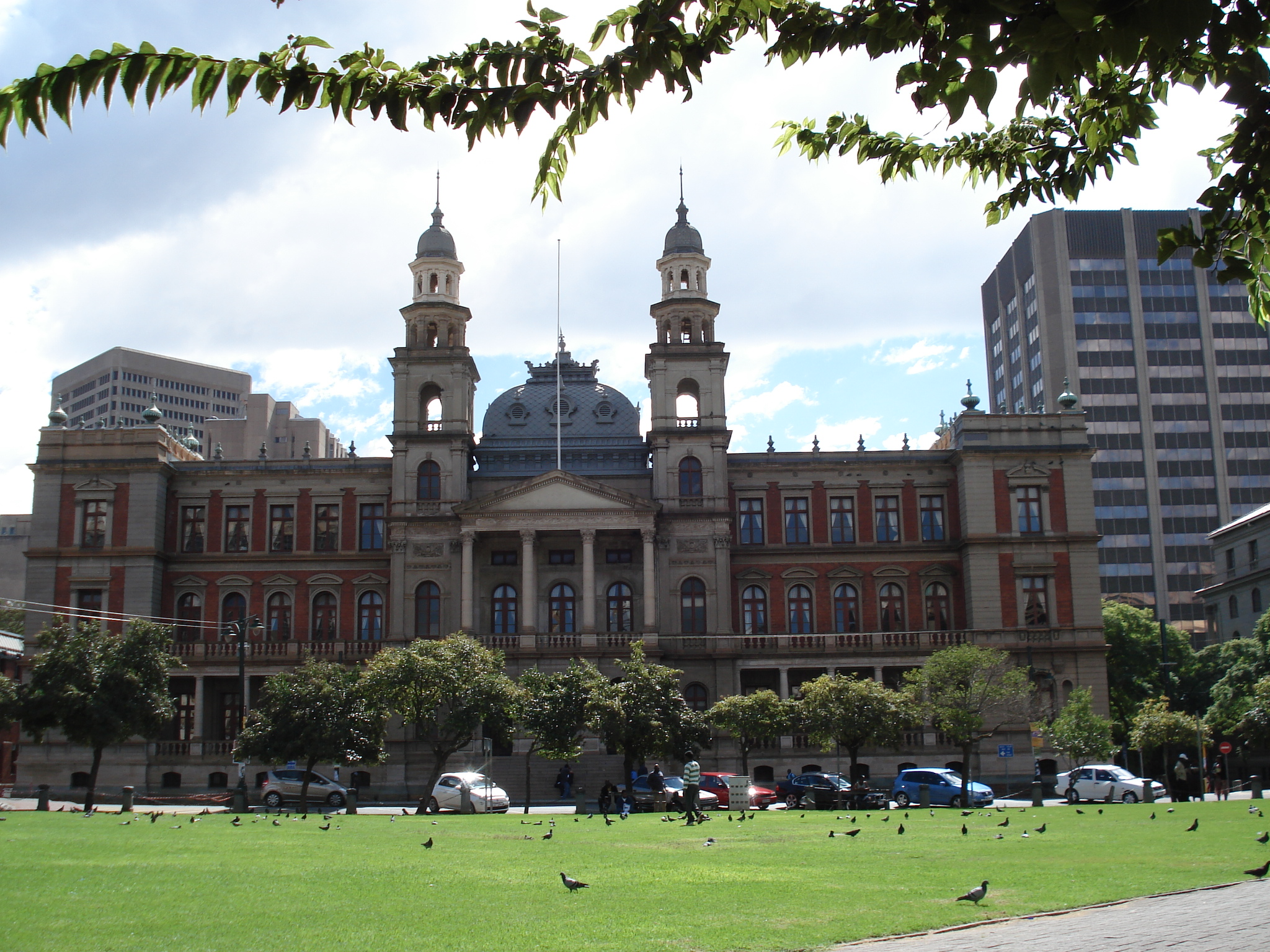
The Palace of Justice in Pretoria

== Bail hearing ==
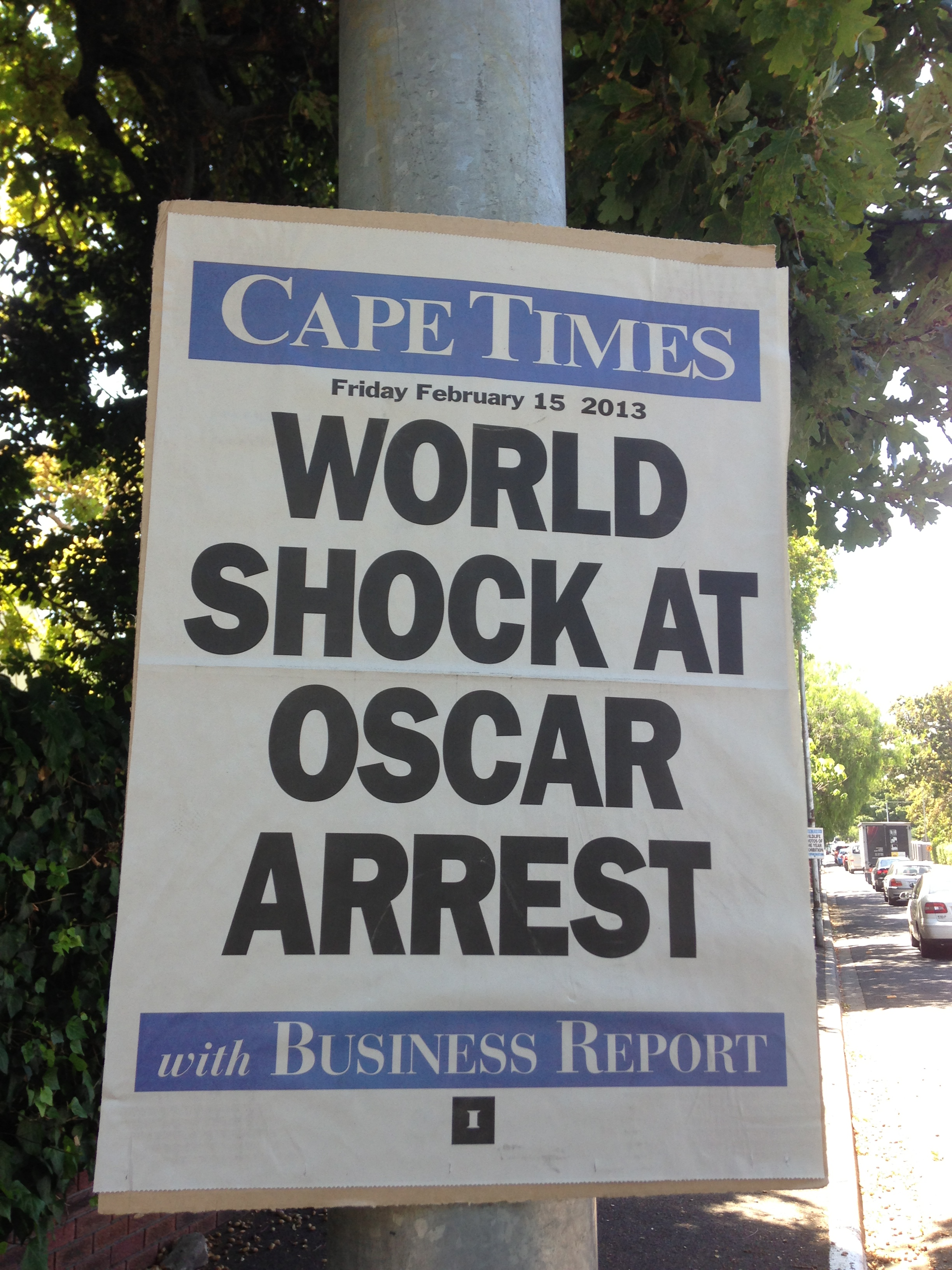
Cape Times billboard following the arrest of Pistorius in February 2013

The bail hearing commenced on 19 February 2013 before Chief Magistrate of Pretoria, Desmond Nair. On the first day of the bail hearing, Magistrate Nair ruled that Pistorius was charged with a Schedule 6 criminal offence, which relates to serious crimes including premeditated murder and requires exceptional circumstances for release on bail.

Both the prosecution and the defence said that Pistorius had fired four shots through a locked toilet door, hitting Steenkamp, who was inside, three times. Based on testimony from Detective Hilton Botha, Prosecutor Gerrie Nel claimed that Pistorius had put on his prosthetic legs, walked across his bedroom to the bathroom, and intentionally shot Steenkamp through the door. Nel argued that the time required for this process was sufficient to establish the alleged murder as premeditated.

Pistorius said that he had thought Steenkamp was in the bed and that the person in the toilet was an intruder, and that he did not put his prosthetic legs on until after firing the shots. Detective Hilton Botha argued that Pistorius was a flight risk and should remain in custody because he had a house in Italy and offshore bank accounts. Defence lawyer Barry Roux denied that Pistorius owned a house in Italy. He also observed that Pistorius' prosthetic legs and his fame meant it was virtually impossible for him to flee without being recognized. On 22 February 2013, at the conclusion of the four-day bail hearing, Magistrate Nair said that the state had not convinced him that Pistorius posed a flight risk and released him on bail, which was fixed at R1 million (US$113,000).

== Replacement of lead detective ==
Detective Hilton Botha was the first police officer to arrive at the scene of the shooting. On the second day of the hearing, Botha, who was the prosecution's lead witness at the hearing, gave contradictory evidence and admitted to a number of procedural mistakes at the crime scene. He initially said the witness who heard screaming was 600 metres (2,000 ft) away but later said the distance was 300 metres (980 ft). It was later determined that this witness lived 177 metres away. Botha also said the trajectory of the gunshots indicated that they had been fired downward and directly toward the toilet, which conflicted with Pistorius' statement that he was not wearing his prosthetics at the time.

Botha acknowledged that procedural mistakes had been made during the crime scene investigation and that police had found no evidence inconsistent with the version of events presented by Pistorius. He had to admit the police had overlooked a bullet that hit the toilet bowl and was later discovered by the defence's forensic team, and that investigators had walked through the crime scene without protective boots. He further had to retract statements that testosterone and needles were found in Pistorius's bedroom, after it was shown the substance he found was a herbal remedy.

The case took a dramatic turn on 22 February 2013, shortly before the trial began after it was disclosed that Botha was facing charges of attempted murder himself. In 2011, Botha along with two other officers, was accused of firing at a taxi with seven passengers inside during a drunken incident. The case had been dropped but was reinstated on 4 February, 10 days before Pistorius shot Steenkamp. Botha was replaced by Vineshkumar Moonoo, described as "the most senior detective" in the South African Police Service.

== Trial ==
The trial commenced on 3 March 2014 in the High Court in Pretoria. There was no jury, as the jury system in South Africa was abolished during the apartheid era. The trial was assigned to judge Thokozile Masipa, who appointed two assessors, Janette Henzen du Toit and Themba Mazibuko, to help her evaluate the case and reach a verdict. In addition to the murder charge, Pistorius also faced a charge of illegal possession of ammunition and two charges of firing a gun in a public space.

Section 35 of the South African Bill of Rights provides: "Every accused person has a right to a fair trial, which includes the right ... to be tried in a language that the accused person understands ... ." At the start of the trial, Masipa told the court that the proceedings would be held in South African English with the assistance of interpreters, and confirmed that Pistorius spoke English. The opening statement of prosecutor Gerrie Nel observed that the murder case against Pistorius was based largely on circumstantial evidence, as there were no eyewitnesses to the incident.

=== Pistorius' version of events ===
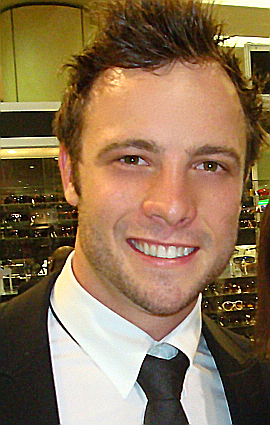
Pistorius in 2010

Pistorius provided an affidavit to the court in which he stated the following:

- "By about 22h00 on 13 February 2013 we were in our bedroom. She was doing her yoga exercises and I was in bed watching television. My prosthetic legs were off" (para 16.4).
- "After Reeva finished her yoga exercises she got into bed and we both fell asleep" (16.5).
- "During the early morning hours of 14 February 2013, I woke up, went onto the balcony to bring the fan in and closed the sliding doors, the blinds and the curtains (16.7).

At the trial, the defence said that Pistorius woke up because of the heat and humidity. Steenkamp was already awake and asked him if he was having trouble sleeping. Walking around on his stumps, Pistorius opened the balcony door and brought in a fan to try and cool the room down. While doing this, he heard a noise coming from the bathroom. He thought an intruder had broken into the house. He got his gun from under the bed, and whispered to Steenkamp to call police.

- "I heard a noise in the bathroom and realised that someone was in the bathroom." (16.7).
- "I believed that someone had entered my house. I was too scared to switch a light on." (16.9)
- "I grabbed my 9mm pistol from underneath my bed. On my way to the bathroom I screamed words to the effect for him/them to get out of my house and for Reeva to phone the police. It was pitch dark in the bedroom and I thought Reeva was in bed." (16.10).
- "I noticed that the bathroom window was open. I realised that the intruder/s was/were in the toilet because the toilet door was closed and I did not see anyone in the bathroom. I heard movement inside the toilet. The toilet is inside the bathroom and has a separate door." (16.11).
- "It filled me with horror and fear of an intruder or intruders being inside the toilet. I thought he or they must have entered through the unprotected window. As I did not have my prosthetic legs on and felt extremely vulnerable, I knew I had to protect Reeva and myself. I believed that when the intruder/s came out of the toilet we would be in grave danger. I felt trapped as my bedroom door was locked and I have limited mobility on my stumps." (16.12).
- "I fired shots at the toilet door and shouted to Reeva to phone the police. She did not respond and I moved backwards out of the bathroom, keeping my eyes on the bathroom entrance. Everything was pitch dark in the bedroom and I was still too scared to switch on a light." (16.13).
- "When I reached the bed, I realised that Reeva was not in bed. That is when it dawned on me that it could have been Reeva who was in the toilet. I returned to the bathroom calling her name. I tried to open the toilet door but it was locked. I rushed back into the bedroom and opened the sliding door exiting onto the balcony and screamed for help." (16.14).

Pistorius then returned to the bathroom calling out for Reeva as he did so. He said he tried to open the toilet door, but couldn't because it was locked. He then went back into the bedroom on his stumps, opened the balcony door and started screaming for help. He put on his prosthetic legs, and then tried to kick down the toilet door open. When that did not work, he moved back to the bedroom to get his cricket bat. He used the bat to smash holes in the door. One of the door panels broke open enabling him to reach inside and open the door. He found Steenkamp alive, slumped over the toilet.

Pistorius was cross examined about his version of events for five days.

=== Immediately after the shooting ===
At the trial, Pistorius' neighbour, Johan Stipp, a radiologist, testified that he found Pistorius praying over Steenkamp's body when he went over to help after being woken by what he described as the sound of gunshots and a woman screaming. Stipp testified that the first thing he remembered Pistorius saying when he saw him was "I shot her. I thought she was a burglar. I shot her."

Johan Stander, manager of the estate where Pistorius lived, testified that Pistorius called at 3.18 am saying: "Please, please come to my house. I shot Reeva, I thought she was an intruder. Please, please come quick." He went with his daughter and found Pistorius coming down the stairs with Steenkamp in his arms. He said: "He was broken, he was screaming, he was crying, he was praying, I saw the truth that morning."

=== Defence case ===
The lead defence advocate in the case was Barry Roux. Pistorius' defence was that, by shooting at what he believed to be an intruder, he believed he was acting in self-defence. He had no intention or motive to kill Steenkamp. Therefore, Pistorius' defence amounted to a claim that he did not intend to act unlawfully. If the killing of Steenkamp was unintentional, under South African law he should not be found guilty of murder. The court then had to consider whether firing the shots was something that a reasonable person, in his circumstances, would have done. If the court concluded that this was a reasonable mistake, it would convict him of Culpable homicide – defined in South African criminal law as the negligent unlawful killing of another human being – roughly the equivalent to the concept of manslaughter in other jurisdictions.

The defence challenged the state's timing of the fatal shots disputing allegations that they occurred after an argument. The state claimed the shots occurred at 3.17am. Roux said the noises heard at that time were made by Pistorius as he smashed open the toilet door with a cricket bat. The shots were fired earlier, which meant that the screams heard by witnesses before 3.17am were made by Pistorius calling for help. The defence argued that the screams could not have been made by Steenkamp because she was already fatally wounded.

The defence closed its case on 8 July. Barry Roux stated that the timeline of events laid out by the defence proves that Pistorius' story is true, and that Pistorius should only ever have faced culpable homicide charges, not murder, and protested: "We were unable to call a number of witnesses because they refused, and didn't want their voices heard all over the world."

=== Prosecution case ===
Chief prosecutor Gerrie Nel claimed the killing was premeditated, and that Pistorius shot Steenkamp deliberately after they had an argument. At the trial, he said: "You fired four shots through the door whilst knowing that she was standing behind the door." At the trial, pathologist Gert Saayman said Steenkamp was shot in the head, pelvis, and arm with Black Talon hollow-point bullets, which open up into a petal-like shape on impact, and were "designed to cause maximum damage".

Nel said the killing was premeditated based on contested testimony by those who lived nearby that they heard an argument and a woman screaming prior to shots being fired. The defence argued that the screaming all came from Pistorius. Whether what the witnesses heard were gun shots or the whacks of his cricket bat breaking down the door afterwards was also contested. Concerned about the claim of premeditation, the presiding magistrate asked Nel why Pistorius had not staged a break-in to make his story look more believable. Nel replied: "He planned it that night when she (Steenkamp) locked herself in (the toilet)."

In his closing arguments, Nel claimed that Pistorius concocted a "snowball of lies", demanding that Pistorius face consequences for his actions.

=== Contested issues at the trial ===
==== Wearing of prosthetic legs ====
At the bail hearing, the prosecution argued that Pistorius was wearing his prosthetic legs when he shot Steenkamp, claiming that the time he took to put them on was evidence of premeditated murder. However, when the case went to trial, Nel agreed that Pistorius was not wearing them at the time of the shooting, after prosecution witness Christian Mangena, a police ballistics analyst, testified "the shooter was most likely not wearing prosthetic legs".

Prosecution witness Johannes Vermeulen, a police forensic analyst, testified Pistorius was probably not wearing his prosthetic legs when he broke the toilet door down with a cricket bat after the shooting either. However, defence lawyer Roux pointed out to Vermeulen that if Pistorius had been on his stumps, he would not have been able to balance while swinging a cricket bat with enough force to break the door.

==== Pistorius–Steenkamp relationship ====
===== Text messages =====
Pistorius and Steenkamp had only been dating for three months when she was shot. Peet van Zyl, Pistorius's agent, testified that Pistorius was in a "loving and caring relationship" with Steenkamp. Van Zyl described the sprinter as "hypervigilant", and said he rarely lost his temper.

On 24 March, the court heard testimony about messages sent on iPhones between Pistorius and Steenkamp using WhatsApp. Ninety percent of them were described as loving and normal, but there were a few from Steenkamp accusing Pistorius of jealousy and possessiveness. In one of them, sent less than three weeks before her killing, Steenkamp told Pistorius "I'm scared of you sometimes, of how you snap at me", and described his behaviour as "nasty".

Roux pointed out that out of 1,700 messages between Pistorius and Steenkamp, only four conversations were argumentative. Roux told the Court: "There was a disagreement, unhappiness, but if you look at the messages, it was resolved very quickly." On 13 February, just a few hours before she died, Steenkamp sent Pistorius a text saying: "You are an amazing person with so many blessings and you are more than cared for." Pistorius replied: "Stay tonight if you like."

Steenkamp died on Valentine's Day. At one point in the trial, Roux asked Pistorius to read from a Valentine card which Steenkamp had given the athlete before she died. Steenkamp wrote: "I think today is a good day to tell you that, I love you."

===== Claims of arguing =====
The prosecution tried to show that Pistorius and Steenkamp were heard arguing prior to the shooting. The state’s first witness, Michelle Burger, lived 177 metres away from Pistorius' house but claimed to hear Steenkamp screaming from behind the closed toilet door. Acoustic engineer Ivan Lin testified that tests suggested that if Steenkamp was screaming in Pistorius' toilet, it was "very unlikely" that the screams would be audible or intelligible from 177 metres (581 ft) away, and that "although we can typically distinguish male and female screams, you cannot do so reliably, without exception". Pistorius's lawyer Barry Roux suggested to Michelle Burger that Pistorius was so upset, his voice became high pitched and that he sounded like a woman when he screamed. Roux also said it was impossible for Steenkamp to have cried out after the shots because she was shot in the head and had brain damage.

A number of other witnesses claimed they heard a woman's screams and gunshots on the night Steenkamp died. The defence cross examined these witnesses, attempting to establish that, in fact, this was Pistorius screaming for help and that the "explosive sounds" came from the door to the toilet being battered down. This argument was bolstered on 6 May by a married couple who lived next to Pistorius's house, testifying that they both heard a man crying loudly in a high-pitched voice and calling three times for help. Another immediate neighbour testified that she heard a man crying, describing the sounds as a "cry of pain".

==== Pistorius' mental state ====
===== Level of distress =====
Throughout the court proceedings, Pistorius had numerous emotional outbursts, including crying, howling, and vomiting. When asked in court to explain what happened, he cried loudly "his body racked with sobs". Masipa temporarily adjourned proceedings to allow him to calm down. Yvette van Schalkwyk, a social worker and probation officer, was assigned to Pistorius after he shot dead his girlfriend. She testified that he was heartbroken and genuinely sorry for what Steenkamp's parents were going through. She said that in February 2013 she sat with him in the cells during his bail appearance, where he vomited twice and cried 80 percent of the time. She said he was in mourning, suffering emotionally, and that Pistorius told her he missed Steenkamp a great deal. She said: "He loved her. ... He couldn't think what her parents must be going through."

Prosecutor Gerrie Nel, known as a "bull terrier" for his aggressive interrogations, claimed Pistorius had not shown any remorse and accused Pistorius of "getting emotional (in court) because you're getting frustrated because your version [of events] is improbable."

===== Psychiatric assessment =====
Eventually, Nel requested a mental health assessment which was conducted by psychiatrist Merryll Vorster. She concluded that Pistorius had an anxiety disorder stemming from his childhood. His parents separated when he was six and his father was hardly ever around. His mother was so anxious that she slept with a firearm under her pillow. She died in 2002, which meant Pistorius lost an "emotional attachment figure". Given his disability, Vorster argued that Pistorius was more likely to respond to any threat with "fight" rather than "flight". The evaluation also found that Pistorius was not mentally incapacitated to the extent where he could not tell right from wrong, although it said that he was suffering from a post-traumatic stress disorder and would need continuing psychiatric care or he could become suicidal.

On 30 June, Gerald Versfeld, the surgeon who amputated Pistorius' legs when he was eleven months old, agreed that he would be "severely impaired in a dangerous situation, and would be unable to flee if on his stumps".

===== Psychological assessment =====
Pistorius was assessed by clinical psychologist Jonathan Scholtz. On 2 July, defence lawyer Roux read excerpts from his report, which stated: "Mr Pistorius has been severely traumatised by the events that took place on 14 February 2013, He currently suffers from a post-traumatic stress disorder, and a major depressive disorder ... The degree of anxiety and depression that is present is significant. He is also mourning the loss of Ms Steenkamp. Mr Pistorius is being treated and should continue to receive clinical care by a psychiatrist and a clinical psychologist for his current condition. Should he not receive proper clinical care, his condition is likely to worsen and increase the risk for suicide." The report did not confirm a diagnosis of "Generalised Anxiety Disorder" by a witness called by the defence, stating: "No evidence could be found to indicate that Mr Pistorius suffered from anxiety to the extent that it impaired his functioning prior to the incident in February 2013." The report found some jealousy but no evidence of abuse by Pistorius, stating: "There is evidence to indicate that Mr Pistorius was genuine with his feelings towards Miss Steenkamp and that they had a normal loving relationship. He did become insecure and jealous at times but this was normal for the specific situation. He would express his displeasure and irritation but would try and sort it out later by talking with Miss Steenkamp. Although the relationship was still young, there were no signs of abusive coercion like those often found in these kinds of relationships."

Wayne Derman, professor of sport and exercise medicine at the University of Cape Town, testified that Pistorius was "hyper-vigilant". On 3 July, under cross-examination, Derman testified: "You've got a paradox of an individual who is supremely able, and you've got an individual who is significantly disabled." Derman, who had treated Pistorius over six years while working with South African Olympic and Paralympic teams, said Pistorius' anxieties included concern about flying, saying that he has "a specific fear of being trapped somewhere without being able to move very rapidly", and that on the night he killed Steenkamp, "fleeing was not an option" as Pistorius was not wearing his artificial legs.

==== Love of guns ====
Sean Rens, manager of the International Firearm Training Academy in Walkerville, testified at the trial that Pistorius had "a great love and enthusiasm" for guns. Rens testified that Pistorius purchased a Smith & Wesson 500 revolver handgun from him, and wanted Rens to obtain five other particular firearms for him. Pistorius told Rens he was going to apply for a collector's license. Rens also described an incident, which occurred months before Pistorius killed Steenkamp, where he heard a noise in the house, drew his gun, and went into "combat mode". The noise turned out to be coming from his laundry machine. Rens testified that Pistorius was well aware of rules on gun use in South Africa and how to deal with intruders.

In addition to murder, Pistorius was charged with two other gun-related charges. The first alleged that he recklessly shot his gun out of the open sunroof of a car the previous year and the second that he fired someone else's handgun at a restaurant a few weeks before he shot and killed Steenkamp. His former girlfriend, Samantha Taylor, testified that the sunroof incident occurred when Pistorius became angry after he was stopped for speeding by a police officer. She said Pistorius kept his gun with him all the time, and that he could get very angry.

=== Verdict ===
The court's verdict, which was arrived at unanimously by the judge and her two assessors, was delivered by Masipa over two days. On 11 September, she dismissed much of the state's circumstantial evidence, while also describing Pistorius as a "very poor witness". She said the state had not proved beyond a reasonable doubt that Pistorius was guilty of premeditated murder and also ruled out dolus eventualis, i.e. common murder, accepting that "he did not subjectively foresee this as a possibility, that he would kill the person behind the door, let alone the deceased as he thought she was in the bedroom". Masipa also said a reasonable person in the same circumstances would have "foreseen the possibility that if he fired four shots whoever was behind the toilet [door] might be struck and die as a result". She said Pistorius "failed to take any steps to avoid the death", "acted too hastily and used excessive force" and his actions were clearly negligent.

On 12 September, the judge found Pistorius not guilty of murder but guilty of the culpable homicide of Steenkamp and guilty of reckless endangerment with a firearm at a restaurant in a separate incident. He was found not guilty of the charges relating to discharging a firearm through the sunroof of a car and illegal possession of ammunition. The trial was adjourned until 13 October 2014 for sentencing, and Pistorius was granted an extension of his bail.

==== Reactions ====
According to media monitoring company ROi Africa, the majority of social media comments during the delivery of the verdict were critical of Masipa after it became evident that Pistorius would not be found guilty of murder. Masipa, who was given police protection from the beginning of the trial, was subjected to threats and personal attacks by people who disagreed with the verdict.

== Sentencing ==
The sentencing hearing began on 13 October 2014. Witnesses for the defence recommended a three-year community sentence (correctional supervision) with 16 hours of community service per month. State witness Zach Modise, acting national commissioner of Correctional Services, testified that being disabled Pistorius would be held in Pretoria Central Prison's hospital wing if he receives a prison sentence. In a statement released on 15 October, Steenkamp's parents said they would not testify in the sentencing hearing and that they had decided not to proceed with a separate civil lawsuit. Steenkamp's cousin Kim Martin testified for the state about the impact on the family and asked the court to impose a prison sentence. Closing arguments were heard on 17 October, when the defence argued against a prison sentence and the state requested a minimum prison sentence of 10 years. The state rested their case on 25 March, having called 20 witnesses from an original list of 107.

On 21 October 2014, Pistorius received a prison sentence of a maximum of five years for culpable homicide. Part of the sentence may be served under correctional supervision; after he has served a minimum of one-sixth of five years (10 months) in prison. He also received a concurrent three-year prison sentence, which was suspended for five years, for the separate reckless endangerment conviction.

=== Release on parole ===
On 8 June 2015, South African Commissioner of Correctional Services Zach Modise said that the prison case management committee had recommended that Pistorius be released under correctional supervision on 21 August 2015 having served a sixth of his sentence. This release was based on good behavior and the fact that he is not considered a danger to the community. Pistorius would remain under house arrest and correctional supervision, and may be required to perform community service as part of his continuing sentence. Regardless of his release from prison, Pistorius would not be allowed to return to official athletic competition until the whole five years of his sentence was complete.

On 19 August 2015, two days before Pistorius was due to leave prison, the justice minister Michael Masutha sent the case to the parole review board, saying that the parole board should not have started considering parole until Pistorius had completed a sixth of his sentence. Legal experts said this was a novel interpretation of the law, and that parole boards generally considered parole in advance of the earliest release date. Suggestions of improper political interference were made, after a tweet on the official Twitter page of the ruling party, the African National Congress, incorrectly referred to Pistorius as a "convicted murderer".

The parole review board met on 18 September but the decision was put off for two weeks. Manelisi Wolela, spokesman for the Department of Correctional Services, said: "They could not deal with all the matters at hand" . On 5 October 2015, the parole review board referred the parole decision back to the original parole panel, stating that Pistorius should be "subjected to psychotherapy" as part of his parole conditions. Pistorius' family questioned the legality of the delay, suggesting that he was not treated like other prisoners due to "the public, political and media hype", and stated that he was already receiving ongoing psychotherapy. On 9 October 2015, the parole board met again and postponed a hearing until 15 October, stating the board would again consult the family of Reeva Steenkamp. On 15 October 2015, the parole board confirmed Pistorius would be released to house arrest on 20 October 2015; however, Pistorius was released on 19 October 2015.

== Appeal ==
On 27 October 2014, prosecution spokesman Nathi Mncube confirmed that prosecutors would lodge an appeal against both the verdict and the sentence, arguing that Masipa misinterpreted the law when she cleared Pistorius of murder on the basis that he did not intentionally shoot Steenkamp. On 10 December 2014, Masipa gave prosecutors leave to appeal against the murder acquittal but not the five-year sentence given for the lesser charge of culpable homicide. On 13 March 2015, Masipa dismissed the defence application to block prosecutors from appealing the culpable homicide verdict, stating that it would be tantamount to reviewing her own decision to permit the application. On 14 September 2015, the defence filed papers arguing that the state was disputing Masipa's finding that Pistorius did not intend to kill Steenkamp; this was not allowed. On 22 September 2015, the Supreme Court of Appeal confirmed the appeal would be heard on 3 November 2015 by Judges Lex Mpati, Nonkosi Mhlantla, Eric Leach, Steven Majiedt, and Elizabeth Baartman.

South Africa's Supreme Court of Appeal heard the case on 3 November 2015. The prosecution argued that the identity of the person behind the toilet door was irrelevant. The defence submitted that Pistorius genuinely believed his life was in danger when he opened fire. The court overturned the verdict of the trial court on 3 December 2015, entering a conviction of murder, finding that the lower court did not correctly apply the rule of dolus eventualis, and also that Pistorius did not fear his own life was in danger. The decision by the five judges was unanimous. Justice Eric Leach said that since Pistorius used a high-calibre weapon, and had firearms training, he should have realised that whoever was behind the door might die. Finding him guilty of murder, the panel of appeal judges described the case as "a human tragedy of Shakespearean proportions".

On 8 December 2015, it was announced that Pistorius would continue to remain free on bail of 10,000 rand (under £500, US $686) since judge Aubrey Ledwaba did not consider him to be a flight risk, though remaining under house arrest. He was to be allowed to leave home between 7 am and noon each day but staying within a 20 km radius of his uncle's mansion in Pretoria, to be enforced with the aid of an electronic monitoring device. He was required to give up his passport. Pistorius would appeal his murder conviction in South Africa's Constitutional Court. On 11 January 2016, Pistorius applied for leave to appeal to South Africa’s constitutional court, his lawyers contended that the Supreme Court of Appeal had "acted unlawfully and unconstitutionally" by rejecting factual findings of the original verdict, and made mistakes in its application of the principle of dolus eventualis. On 3 March 2016, the Constitutional Court denied the application.

=== Re-sentencing ===
In December 2015, the Supreme Court of Appeal overturned the culpable homicide verdict and found Pistorius guilty of murder, concluding that Pistorius should have known that firing his gun would have killed whoever was behind the door, regardless of who he thought it was. On 6 July 2016, Thokozile Masipa sentenced Pistorius to six years in prison for murder, although the prosecution had called for 15 years, the minimum prison sentence in South Africa for murder. Masipa argued that Pistorius had already served 12 months in prison for the culpable homicide conviction and was remorseful for his killing. In November 2017, the South African Supreme Court of Appeal added 9 years to the sentence, for a total of 15 years, following a government appeal. Pistorius was eligible for parole in 2023. Pistorius and his defense team appealed the ruling, but the Constitutional Court dismissed his request for leave to appeal in March 2018.

== Parole and release ==
On 31 March 2023, Pistorius was denied parole. On 5 January 2024, Pistorius was released on parole after having served nine years of his sentence.

== Notable media coverage ==
=== Print media ===
Pistorius on the cover of Time in 2013

- Time published a cover story titled "Pistorius and South Africa's culture of violence" in the 11 March 2013 issue of the magazine. The magazine cover contains text superimposed on an image of a barechested Pistorius with his running blades on, portraying his progression from man to superman to gunman. Journalism professor at City University London Roy Greenslade described the cover image as "one of those striking cover images that bears all the hallmarks of being one that will live on for years to come". The Sowetan listed the cover appearance date as one of the "key dates in his journey from internationally renowned athlete to a man on trial for murder".
- Vanity Fair published a feature story about the incident titled "The Shooting Star and The Model" in the Crime section of their June 2013 issue.
- On 4 March 2014, The Guardian published an article by South African crime novelist Margie Orford, "Oscar Pistorius trial: the imaginary black stranger at heart of the defence", describing how the case "taps into a painful narrative in which race, sex, power and violence converge".
- In his Business Day column published on 13 March 2014, Caxton Professor of Journalism at Wits University Anton Harber states that the trial represents a turning point for local newspapers unable to compete with "the speed and conversational nature of electronic media". He also notes that the fact that the presiding judge has "her finger on the off button for live broadcast" is restraining the behaviour of the media.
- Several cartoons about the case by award-winning South African cartoonist Zapiro have been published. A cartoon titled "St. Valentine's Day Shocker" published in the Mail & Guardian on 14 February 2013 depicts two scenarios, one portraying the culpable homicide version of events based on mistaken identity and the other portraying Pistorius as an Oscar-winning actor. A cartoon titled "Reeva Steenkamp as Lady Justice in Oscar Pistorius Trial" published in The Times on 4 March 2014 depicts Steenkamp as Lady Justice running after Pistorius. A cartoon titled "Legal Reasoning Behind Oscar Pistorius Verdict" published in The Times on 16 September 2014 depicts the ensuing public debate about the legal technicalities of the verdict.
- A controversial Paddy Power advertisement captioned "money back if he walks" was published in British tabloid The Sun on 2 March 2014 as a publicity stunt. The UK Advertising Standards Authority found that Paddy Power breached the CAP Code and brought the advertising industry into disrepute after receiving a record number of 5,525 complaints that the advertisement made light of a murder trial, the death of a woman, domestic violence and disability.
- On 12 September 2014 ,The New York Times compared the South African public's interest in the trial to that of Americans in the O. J. Simpson murder trial, reflecting "South Africa's complicated obsession with race, crime and celebrity".
- On 23 October 2015, the South African Press Ombudsman concluded that a story published in August 2015 by the "Saturday Star" was "blatantly inaccurate and unfair to Pistorius" and directed the paper to publish an apology. The South African Judiciary Inspectorate of Correctional Services (JICS) apologised to Pistorius for misleading statements made by a representative quoted in the media in August 2015.

=== Radio, television, and film ===
- On 11 March 2013, BBC Three aired an hour-long documentary about the incident titled Oscar Pistorius: What Really Happened? Discovery International acquired the broadcasting rights to the programme, which will be titled Blade Runner: The Untold Story in the United States.
- On 3 June 2013, Channel 5 aired two consecutive hour-long documentaries titled Why Did Oscar Pistorius Kill Our Daughter? and Pistorius Trial: The Key Questions.
- On 29 January 2014, it was announced that South African satellite pay-channel DStv would launch a dedicated 24-hour channel providing in-depth coverage of the Oscar Pistorius trial on 2 March 2014. It was DStv's first pop-up channel covering a major news story.
- In February 2014, eNCA aired a half-hour documentary special about Steenkamp's life titled Reeva: The Model You Thought You Knew.
- An hour-long documentary titled Oscar Pistorius: Burden of Truth was aired during M-Net's Carte Blanche programme on 16 February 2014 and subsequently on the Crime & Investigation Network.
- On 3 March 2014, Eyewitness News, along with sister radio brands 702 and CapeTalk, launched a digital pop-up radio station covering the Oscar Pistorius trial. The radio station was available on desktop and mobile, as well as on the Primedia Broadcasting audio streaming apps. The pop-up radio station was available during every day of the trial, concluding on the final day of sentencing on 21 October 2014.
- ESPN, a TV channel focussing on sports-related programming, covered the trial on their ESPN3 network.
- On 16 June 2014, 48 Hours aired an hour-long documentary titled Oscar Pistorius: Shots in the Dark.
- On 6 July 2014, Australia's Seven Network dedicated an hour-long episode of Sunday Night to a story titled Running Scared which was their own investigation into the likelihood of Pistorius' guilt. The story included Pistorius' own reenactments as well as audio recordings and animations of the scene, and gave much heavier weight to claims of his innocence. The following day, many in South Africa, including Pistorius' family and legal team, slammed the broadcast, saying the reenactment footage had been illegally obtained. They claimed the footage was created solely for trial preparation and that the US company engaged to create it had breached contract by selling it to Seven Network. Seven Network refused to apologise, stating that they stood by their decision to air the story and denying any involvement in illegal procurement of the footage. They reminded the public that Steenkamp's family participated in the creation of the story, citing their interviews that went to air.
- On 12 September 2014, SABC 3 broadcast an episode of Special Assignment titled Oscar Pistorius: The Verdict. The programme highlighted the missing white woman syndrome media phenomenon in South Africa, given the disproportionate coverage of the trial and the Leigh Matthews murder trial with the coverage relating to the deaths of black women named Zanele Khumalo and Betty Ketane respectively, in similar circumstances and time periods.
- On 15 September 2014, BBC Three broadcast Oscar Pistorius: The Truth, a documentary produced by NBC News subsidiary Peacock Productions, including extensive interviews with Barry and June Steenkamp.

=== Opera ===
- On 18 April 2024, Cape Town Opera gave the world premiere of Trial by Media, an opera by Conrad Asman that explores how print and social media affects celebrity legal cases, using the Pistorius trial as a narrative arch. Notably, Reeva Steenkamp is present throughout the opera, who is cast as a posthumous phantasm whose appearance and personality is drawn from her Instagram account. The work was critically received by national press for giving "a voice to the murder victim" whilst being "a brave and audacious piece of operatic theatre."

=== Social media ===
- On 22 February 2013, technology news site Memeburn analyzed Pistorius's bail hearing as it transpired on social media.
- The Pistorius trial saw many South African journalists gain social media prominence as they reported from the courtroom. Writing for Memeburn, Lauren Granger explored the rise of Barry Bateman as the go to source for all things Pistorius and the Twitter explosion.
- On 14 February 2014, South African comedian Trevor Noah posted on Twitter: "And the Oscar goes to – Jail." Noah received criticism from his followers and other South Africans. People who responded to this post include Top Billing presenter Janez Vermeiren, who responded: "@Trevornoah c'mon you are more than talented and have enough followers, you don't need to seek attention like this!"
- On 23 February 2014, Pistorius's PR team launched a Twitter account called Factual Updates which operates under the Twitter handle @OscarHardTruth in order to provide new information regarding the case as the trial unfolds. On 17 March 2014, Pistorius's media manager Anneliese Burgess released a statement saying the account would only be used to alert followers of media statements and articles and would be used as a stand-alone communication trial once the trial had concluded.
- Writing in her Daily Maverick column published on 4 March 2014, Sisonke Msimang finds vibrancy and emerging self-confidence reflected in the local social media coverage of the trial. While the trial inevitably represents a fall from grace prompting international media accounts of a country 'at war with itself', South Africans are learning that such accounts are better told by themselves.
- On 14 April 2014, former Sunday Times columnist Jani Allan published an open letter to Pistorius on her blog. The piece was republished by the Daily Maverick the following day. Allan described Pistorius as a "faux hero" and compared him to Eugene Terre'Blanche. She also suggested that he had taken acting lessons in preparation for his court appearance. A spokesperson for the Pistorius family has denied this; "We deny in the strongest terms the contents of her letter in as far it relates to our client and further deny that our client has undergone any acting lessons or any form of emotional coaching."
