= Eric Leach =

South African judge

Judge of the Supreme Court of Appeal
- In office 1 December 2009 – 1 June 2020
- Appointed by: Jacob Zuma

Judge of the High Court
- In office 28 June 1993 – 30 November 2009
- Appointed by: F. W. de Klerk
- Division: Eastern Cape

Personal details
- Born: Lorimer Eric Leach; 17 August 1952 (age 73) Port Elizabeth, Cape Province; Union of South Africa
- Education: Hilton College
- Alma mater: Rhodes University; University of Natal

Lorimer Eric Leach (born 17 August 1952) is a South African retired judge who served in the Supreme Court of Appeal from 2009 to 2020. He is best known for writing the judgement in which the Supreme Court found Oscar Pistorius guilty of murder. Before his elevation to the appellate court, he was a judge of the Eastern Cape Division from 1993 to 2009, and he practised as an advocate in Grahamstown from 1976 to 1993, taking silk in 1990.

== Early life and education ==
Leach was born on 17 August 1952 in Port Elizabeth in the Eastern Cape. He matriculated in 1969 at Hilton College in Natal Province, but thereafter he returned to the Cape to enrol at Rhodes University in Grahamstown. After completing his BA at Rhodes in 1972, he completed an LLB at the University of Natal, graduating at the university's Pietermaritzburg campus in 1974. At both universities, he was a member of the provincial athletics team, but his athletic career was cut short by injury.

== Legal career ==
Leach was called to the bar in Grahamstown on 29 January 1976, and he practised as an advocate in Grahamstown for the next 17 years, taking silk in 1990. He was also an acting judge on several occasions between 1991 and 1993.

== Eastern Cape High Court: 1993–2009 ==
On 28 June 1993, Leach joined the bench permanently as a judge of the Eastern Cape Division of the Supreme Court of South Africa. He remained in the court when it became the Eastern Cape High Court after the end of apartheid. He was also an acting judge in the Supreme Court of Appeal in 2008.

== Supreme Court of Appeal: 2009–2020 ==
Leach was shortlisted for elevation to the Supreme Court of Appeal in mid-2009, and he was interviewed by the Judicial Service Commission in July 2009. In November that year, President Jacob Zuma confirmed his appointment to the appellate court, and he took office on 1 December 2009 alongside Jeremiah Shongwe and Zukisa Tshiqi. He served in the appellate court until his retirement in 2020.

During that time, the most notable judgement penned by Leach was that in Director of Public Prosecutions, Gauteng v Pistorius, an appeal of Oscar Pistorius's conviction of culpable homicide in the death of Reeva Steenkamp. Writing on behalf of a unanimous five-member bench, Leach overturned the culpable homicide conviction, which he said had resulted from trial judge Thokozile Masipa's misapplication of the principles of dolus eventualis; the Supreme Court found Pistorius guilty of murder instead.

== Personal life ==
Leach is married to Celeste Embling, with whom he has two sons. He was Chancellor of the Anglican Diocese of Grahamstown from 1983 to 1990.
