= S v B =

South African legal case

In S v B is an important case in South African criminal law, often cited for its findings as to the considerations to be taken into account in sentencing.

== Facts ==
The appellant was convicted in a regional court of attempted rape. He committed the crime barely a month after being convicted of crimen iniuria, assault and malicious injury to property, for which offences he had received a suspended sentence. When he committed the attempted rape, the appellant was twenty-three years and the complainant sixteen years of age.

In sentencing the appellant, the magistrate took into account the prevalence of rape in the area:

Hardly a day goes by without the local courts dealing with one or more of these cases. And, as the prosecutor has indicated, they seem to be on the increase. It seems that the short terms of imprisonment which have been imposed in the past have not acted as sufficient deterrent. Parliament has set its face against this type of offence and has provided for the death penalty to be imposed in appropriate cases.

He found that, when the appellant committed the offence, he knew exactly what he was doing, but accepted in his favour that at the time he had been intoxicated to some extent. The magistrate took into account the circumstances which prevailed when the appellant committed the offence, addressing the appellant thus:

You had the complainant at your mercy, pulled her around by the hair, assaulted her, humiliated her and attempted to rape her. You are a big strong person and she had no chance against you. Fortunately you did not succeed in deflowering her. Had that happened the court would have taken a much more serious view of this incident. But it was purely fortuitous that she was not deflowered. Had you not ejaculated prematurely she might not have been a virgin today.

In rape cases, the magistrate pointed out, it was not only the victim who had an interest in the outcome of the case. If the sentence were too lenient, interested and affected persons might take the law in their own hands. He referred to R v Karg, where Schreiner JA said,

It is not wrong that natural indignation of interested persons and of the community at large should receive some recognition in the sentence that the Courts impose, and it is not irrelevant to bear in mind that, if sentences for serious crimes are too lenient, the administration of justice may fall into disrepute and injured persons may incline to take the law into their own hands.

The magistrate had regard, finally, to the criminal record of the appellant. He expressed the view that the court had a duty towards women, and was obliged to protect them against men like the appellant. The only way that could be done was by imposing an appropriate sentence, he said, and held that, under all the circumstances, a suspended sentence, as suggested by counsel for the appellant, would be inappropriate. The magistrate dealt with the appellant's previous record as follows:

You are by no means a first offender. Your first brush with the law was on 27 April 1976, when you received five cuts following a conviction for theft. Since then you have been convicted of various other offences and your history shows a singular lack of discipline. You have become a liability to society. You committed the present offence whilst the suspended sentence, dated 20 February 1979, was hanging over your head. Your counsel has explained the nature of the crimen injuria offence and the court will accept what he said, namely that there was no physical involvement in that incident and that what had happened is that you had sworn at a woman which led to that conviction and sentence.

The aims which the magistrate had therefore in mind were, in the first instance, deterrence of the appellant himself and, in view of the prevalence of rape and, indeed, an increase of rape cases heard by the courts, deterrence also of others. In view of the offence of rape being one of those offences which evokes public indignation, and in view of the character and personality of the appellant, as revealed by his criminal record, the magistrate added a fair measure of retribution. He obviously decided against a suspended sentence because the suspended sentence which had previously been imposed upon the appellant had not had any deterrent or corrective effect upon him. It had hardly been imposed when the appellant committed the present offence of attempted rape.

The magistrate accordingly sentenced him to five years' imprisonment.

== Argument ==
His appeal to a provincial division failed; he then appealed to the Appellate Division against the sentence imposed upon him.

It was submitted on behalf of the appellant

1. that the magistrate had misdirected himself in over-emphasizing the deterrent and retributive aspects of punishment in assessing an appropriate punishment;
2. that, regard being had to other sentences imposed in similar cases, the sentence in the present case was strikingly disparate; and
3. that the court had failed to take into account certain mitigating factors.

In support of his first submission, counsel referred the Appellate Division to the recent decision in S v Khumalo, where, Nicholas JA, in the course of his majority judgment, said,

In the assessment of an appropriate sentence, regard must be had inter alia to the main purposes of punishment mentioned by Davis AJA in R v Swanepoel 1945 AD 444 at 455, namely deterrent, preventive, reformative and retributive (see S v Whitehead 1970 (4) SA 424 (A) at 436E-F; S v Rabie 1975 (4) SA 855 (A) at 862).

Deterrence has been described as the "essential", "all important", "paramount" and "universally admitted" object of punishment. See R v Swanepoel (supra at 455). The other objects are accessory.

Nicholas JA also remarked that, in modern times, retribution was considered to be of lesser importance, and referred to the very dictum which the magistrate quoted from Karg, adding, however, the following sentence which was omitted by the magistrate: "Naturally, righteous anger should not becloud judgment."

Nicholas JA referred as well to the following dictum by Holmes JA in S v Rabie:

The main purposes of punishment are deterrent, preventive, reformative and retributive: see R v Swanepoel 1945 AD 444 at 455. As pointed out in Gordon Criminal Law of Scotland (1967) at 50:

"The retributive theory finds the justification for punishment in a past act, a wrong which requires punishment or expiation ... The other theories, reformative, preventive and deterrent, all find their justification in the future, in the good that will be produced as a result of the punishment."

It is therefore not surprising that in R v Karg 1961 (1) SA 231 (A) at 236A Schreiner JA observed that, while the deterrent effect of punishment has remained as important as ever,

"the retributive aspect has tended to yield ground to the aspect of prevention and correction".

== Judgment ==
Viljoen JA subscribed fully to these views. Whereas formerly, "particularly in ancient and medieval times and even in the more enlightened period thereafter," retribution was emphasised, "the outlook has gradually changed." In his De Jure Belli ac Pacis, Grotius wrote, "nemo prudens pun it quia peccatum sed ne peccatur." While, in Viljoen JA's estimation, this was true, retribution was, as Schreiner JA had said, by no means absent from the modern approach. What importance the component of retribution should be accorded in a sentence "depends," wrote Viljoen JA, "upon the circumstances."

In Karg, for instance, the Appellate Division considered whether mere negligence as opposed to recklessness, or some high degree of recklessness, merited a considerable degree of retribution in the sentence. As was made clear in the same case, an offence which evoked indignation from the public would attract a greater share of the component of retribution than an offence which did not. Further factors to be taken into account in this respect were the seriousness of the offence and the disposition and attitude of the offender, particularly to his victim.

In the present case, one of the ingredients of the offence, Viljoen JA held, was intent, not negligence. The complainant, a girl of sixteen years, was seriously manhandled by the appellant, who showed no remorse afterwards. The magistrate had correctly taken into account his previous criminal history. This showed a singular lack of discipline, said the magistrate, who correctly described him as a liability to society. In Viljoen JA's view, the magistrate had not overemphasised the retributive aspect.

Viljoen JA also believed that the magistrate had correctly applied the deterrent aims, as far as the appellant himself as well as others were concerned. Considering that his previous sentences had had no deterrent effect upon him, as was illustrated by the commission of the present offence on March 26, 1979, barely a month after a portion of each of his sentences imposed on February 20, 1979, was suspended for three years on various conditions, the magistrate had not erred as far as deterrence of himself was concerned.

The prevalence of the offence and the increase thereof was no doubt taken into account by the magistrate, Viljoen JA believed, in the context of his aim to deter not only the appellant himself, but also others. For that reason, it would not serve any purpose, as the appellant's counsel had invited the Appellate Division to do, to compare other sentences imposed for the same offence. Of course, a comparison of sentences meted out in other cases might serve as a guide to ensure some proportionality in sentences, but it was only a rough guide, according to Viljoen JA, because there were so many factors to be taken into account—they could be usefully collected under the term "individualisation"—that no tariff or standard sentence could be maintained.

One such factor was the personal circumstances of the offender. In the present case it was in fact submitted that the magistrate had not sufficiently taken into account the appellant's personal circumstances. From the record, Viljoen JA found very little as to the appellant's employment, his future prospects of advancement, the effect which a prison sentence was likely to have upon his life, and other such circumstances. Since he was represented at the trial, it might be assumed that, if any such personal circumstances, likely to affect the sentence, did in fact exist, they would have been brought to the notice of the magistrate.

Viljoen JA conceded that the sentence was a heavy one, but found that the magistrate had furnished good reasons for imposing it. As, furthermore, he had not erred in any respect, and as the sentence was not so severe as to lead to the conclusion that no reasonable court would have imposed it, the appeal was duly dismissed.

== See also ==
- South African criminal law
