= S v Sadeke =

In S v Sadeke 1964 (2) SA 674 (T), an important case in South African criminal procedure, Sadeke was on a charge of culpable homicide arising from the death of the deceased when the deceased collided with a lorry driven by Sadeke.

Sadeke had applied for further particulars of the negligence alleged.

The State had furnished him with a roneoed form which embraced every possible form of negligence in the driving of a motor vehicle.

Sadeke appealed on the basis of this ‘scatter-gun’ approach and the court held that such a practice was an abuse of process and should be discontinued: particulars should be given with regard to the evidence which the State intended to lead.
