= Oscar Pistorius =

South African sprinter and convicted murderer (born 1986)

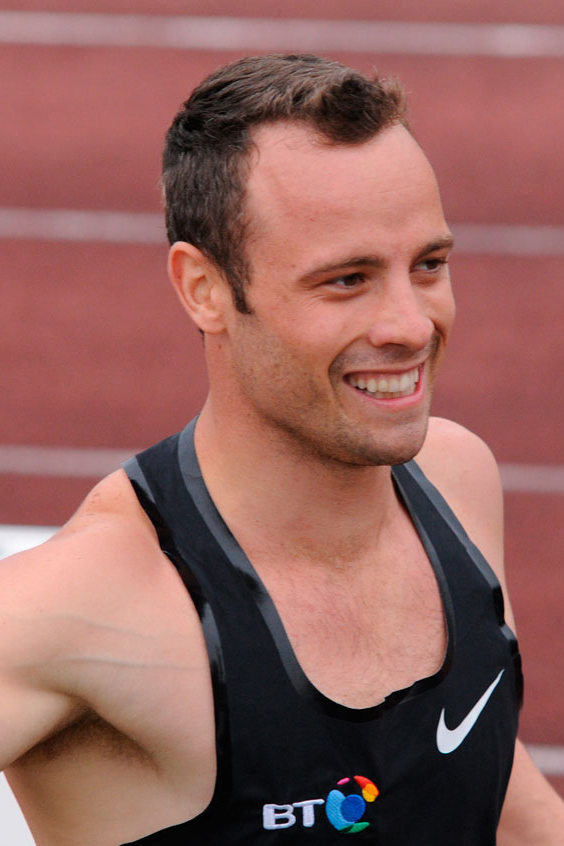
- Pistorius in 2011

Personal information
- Full name: Oscar Leonard Carl Pistorius
- Nicknames: Blade Runner; the fastest man on no legs; Tink Tink; "Oz" Pistorius
- Born: 22 November 1986 (age 39) Johannesburg, Transvaal, (Note: Now Gauteng) South Africa
- Education: University of Pretoria
- Years active: 2004–2013
- Height: 1.60 m (5.2 ft) (without prosthesis)
- Weight: 80.6 kg (178 lb) (without prosthesis) (2007)

Sport
- Country: South Africa
- Sport: Running
- Disability: Double below-knee amputee
- Disability class: T43 (competed in T44)
- Event: Sprint (100, 200, 400 m)
- Retired: 2018

Achievements and titles
- Paralympic finals: 2004 Summer Paralympics: 100 m (T44) – Bronze; 200 m (T44) – Gold 2008 Summer Paralympics: 100 m (T44) – Gold, 200 m (T44) – Gold; 400 m (T44) – Gold 2012 Summer Paralympics: 200 m (T44) – Silver; 4 × 100 m relay – Gold; Men's 400 m (T44) – Gold
- World finals: 2005 Paralympic World Cup: 100 m (T44) – Gold; 200 m (T44) – Gold
- National finals: 2007 South African Senior Athletics Championships: 400 m (T44) – Gold
- Highest world ranking: 100 m: 1st (2008) 200 m: 1st (2008) 400 m: 1st (2008)
- Personal bests: 100 m (T44): 10.91 s (2007, WR) 200 m (T44): 21.30 s (2012, WR) 400 m: 45.07 s
Medal record
Men's Paralympic athletics
Representing South Africa
Paralympic Games
Gold medal – first place	2004 Athens	200 m (T44)
Gold medal – first place	2008 Beijing	100 m (T44)
Gold medal – first place	2008 Beijing	200 m (T44)
Gold medal – first place	2008 Beijing	400 m (T44)
Gold medal – first place	2012 London	400 m (T44)
Gold medal – first place	2012 London	4 × 100 m relay (T42–T46)
Silver medal – second place	2012 London	200 m (T44)
Bronze medal – third place	2004 Athens	100 m (T44)
IPC World Championships
Gold medal – first place	2011 Christchurch	4 × 100 m relay (T42–T46)
Men's athletics
IAAF World Championships
Silver medal – second place	2011 Daegu	4 × 400 m relay
African Championships
Silver medal – second place	2012 Porto-Novo	400 m
Silver medal – second place	2012 Porto-Novo	4 × 400 m relay
- Criminal information
- Convictions: Culpable homicide (overturned) (2014); Murder (2016)
- Penalty: 5 years imprisonment (2014); 6 years imprisonment (2016); 13 years and 5 months imprisonment (2017)
- Capture status: Released on parole after serving 8 years and 6 months (2024)

Details
- Victims: Reeva Steenkamp
- Date: 14 February 2013
- Weapon: Taurus PT 917 CS 9mm semi-automatic pistol w/ Black Talon ammunition
- Imprisoned at: Kgosi Mampuru II jail (2014–2015, 2016); Atteridgeville Correctional Centre (2016–2024)
- Updated on 29 August 2018

Oscar Leonard Carl Pistorius (/pɪˈstɔːriəs/ pist-OR-ee-əs, Afrikaans: [pəˈstuəriœs]; born 22 November 1986) is a South African double amputee, former professional sprinter, and convicted murderer.

On 14 February 2013, Pistorius shot and killed his girlfriend, Reeva Steenkamp, a paralegal and model, in his Pretoria home. He claimed he had mistaken Steenkamp for an intruder hiding in the bathroom. He was arrested and charged with murder. At his trial the following year, Pistorius was found not guilty of murder, but guilty of culpable homicide. He received a five-year prison sentence for culpable homicide and a concurrent three-year suspended sentence for a separate reckless endangerment conviction both in October 2014.

Pistorius was temporarily released on house arrest in October 2015 while the case was presented on appeal to a panel at the Supreme Court of Appeal of South Africa, which overturned the culpable homicide verdict and convicted him of murder. In July 2016, Judge Thokozile Masipa extended Pistorius's sentence to six years. On appeal by the state for a longer prison sentence, the Supreme Court of Appeal increased the prison term to a total of 15 years less time served. Pistorius was released on parole on 5 January 2024 after serving a total of 8.5 years in prison, in addition to seven months' house arrest.

Before his conviction, Pistorius was the 10th athlete to compete at both the Paralympic Games and Olympic Games. Pistorius ran in both nondisabled sprint events and in sprint events for below-knee amputees. Both of his legs were amputated below the knee when he was 11 months old as a result of a birth defect; he was born missing the outsides of both feet and both fibulas. Pistorius's athletic career ended after his murder conviction.

After becoming a Paralympic champion, Pistorius attempted to enter nondisabled international competitions, over persistent objections by the International Association of Athletics Federations (IAAF) and arguments that his artificial limbs gave an unfair advantage. Pistorius prevailed in this legal dispute. At the 2011 World Championships in Athletics, Pistorius was the first amputee to win a nondisabled world track medal. At the 2012 Summer Olympics, Pistorius was the first double-leg amputee participant.

== Early life ==
Oscar Leonard Carl Pistorius was born to Henke and Sheila Pistorius on 22 November 1986 in Sandton, Johannesburg, in what was then Transvaal Province (now Gauteng Province) of South Africa. He grew up in a Christian home and has an elder brother and a younger sister. Pistorius credits his mother, who died at the age of 43 when Pistorius was 15 years old, as a major influence in his life. Pistorius is from an Afrikaner family with partial Italian ancestry from his maternal great-grandfather, who was an Italian emigrant to Kenya. Afrikaans is his mother tongue and he is also fluent in English.

Pistorius was born with fibular hemimelia (congenital absence of the fibula) in both legs. When he was 11 months old, both of his legs were amputated halfway between his knees and ankles. He attended Constantia Kloof Primary School and Pretoria Boys High School, where he played rugby union in the school's third XV team. He played water polo and tennis at provincial level between the ages of 11 and 13. In addition, Pistorius took part in club Olympic wrestling, and trained at Jannie Brooks's garage gym in Pretoria. Brooks remarked that it took six months before he noticed that Pistorius "had no legs" but nonetheless was able to do many exercises, including "boxing, skipping, and doing press-ups".

After a serious rugby knee injury in June 2003, Pistorius was introduced to running in January 2004 while undergoing rehabilitation at the University of Pretoria's High Performance Centre with coach Ampie Louw, and "never looked back". His first racing blades were fitted by South African prosthetist Francois van der Watt. Because he was unable to find suitable running blades in Pretoria, Van der Watt ordered the pair to be made by a local engineer. However, as these quickly broke, Van der Watt referred Pistorius to the American prosthetist and Paralympic sprinter Brian Frasure to be fitted for blades by Icelandic company Össur.

Pistorius began studying for a bachelor of commerce (B.Com.) in business management with sports science at the University of Pretoria in 2006. In a June 2008 interview for his University's website, he joked: "I won't graduate soon. With all the training I have had to cut down on my subjects. Hopefully I'll finish by the time I'm 30!" Asked by a journalist for his "sporting motto", he said, "You're not disabled by the disabilities you have, you are able by the abilities you have."

== Murder of Reeva Steenkamp ==
In the early morning of Thursday, 14 February 2013, Pistorius shot and killed Reeva Steenkamp at his home in Pretoria. Pistorius admitted that he shot Steenkamp four times, causing her death, but claimed he mistook her for a possible intruder.

His murder trial began on 3 March 2014 in the Pretoria High Court. On 20 May, the trial proceedings were adjourned until 30 June to enable Pistorius to undergo psychiatric evaluation to establish whether he could be held criminally responsible for shooting Steenkamp. Judge Thokozile Masipa agreed to a request for the evaluation by prosecutor Gerrie Nel after forensic psychiatrist Merryll Vorster testified for the defence that she had diagnosed Pistorius with generalised anxiety disorder. On 30 June 2014 the trial resumed after the evaluation reports said Pistorius could be held criminally responsible with the state prosecutor saying that Pistorius "did not suffer from a mental illness or defect that would have rendered him not criminally responsible for the offence charged". The defense closed its case on 8 July and closing arguments were heard on 7 and 8 August.

On 12 September, Pistorius was found guilty of culpable homicide and one firearm-related charge of reckless endangerment related to discharging a firearm in a restaurant. He was found not guilty of two other firearm-related charges relating to possession of illegal ammunition and firing a firearm through the sunroof of a car. On 21 October 2014, he received a prison sentence of a maximum of five years for culpable homicide and a concurrent three-year suspended prison sentence for the separate reckless endangerment conviction.

=== First prison term ===
In June 2015, Pistorius was recommended for early release, as early as August. South African Commissioner of Correctional Services Zach Modise told the BBC of the decision by the case management committee at the Kgosi Mampuru II prison in Pretoria, where Pistorius was being held: "Under South African law he is eligible for release under 'correctional supervision' having served a sixth of his sentence."

After Pistorius served approximately one-sixth of his prison term, his release date to house arrest was announced for 21 August 2015. This release was based on good behaviour and the fact that he was not considered a danger to the community. Pistorius was expected to remain under house arrest and correctional supervision, and was expected to perform community service as part of his continuing sentence. Regardless of his release from prison, Pistorius could not return to official athletic competition until the whole five years of his sentence was complete. On 19 August 2015, his release was unexpectedly blocked by South Africa's Justice Minister Michael Masutha. According to Masutha, the parole board's decision for early release was "premature". Legal experts noted that the move could have been due to political pressure and had implications for other cases of pending early release. He was released from prison on 19 October 2015.

=== Case appeal ===
On 4 November 2014, prosecutors applied to the sentencing judge for permission to appeal the culpable homicide verdict, stating that the five-year prison term was "shockingly light, inappropriate and would not have been imposed by any reasonable court". Judge Thokozile Masipa ruled on 10 December 2014 that the prosecution could challenge her ruling of acquitting Pistorius of premeditated murder and convicting him of the lesser charge of culpable homicide; however she ruled that the state could not appeal the length of the sentence. The case was then set for appeal in front of a five-person panel at the Supreme Court of Appeal.

The date for prosecutors to submit court papers outlining their arguments was set for 17 August 2015, and the date for the defence team's response was set for 17 September 2015. The date for the appeal hearing was set for November 2015. The prosecutors' argument rested on Judge Masipa's application of the legal principle of dolus eventualis (whether an accused did actually foresee the outcome of his actions, rather than whether he or she should have), and that the judge made an error in concluding Pistorius had not foreseen that by firing four shots through the closed door of the toilet cubicle, he would kill or injure whoever was behind the door.

The appeal was heard on 3 November 2015, in the Supreme Court of Appeal, Bloemfontein. The matter was heard before five Supreme Court judges. By a unanimous decision, the court overturned Pistorius's culpable homicide conviction and found him guilty of murder in the death of Reeva Steenkamp. Judge Eric Leach read the summary of judgment. The panel of five judges found for the prosecutor's argument that Pistorius must have known that someone would die if he fired through the closed door into a small toilet cubicle. In the words of Judge Leach, "Although he may have been anxious, it is inconceivable that a rational person could have believed he was entitled to fire at this person with a heavy-calibre firearm, without taking even that most elementary precaution of firing a warning shot, which the accused said he elected not to fire as he thought the ricochet might harm him."

According to the judgment, the person who Pistorius thought was in the cubicle had nothing to do with the results of his actions. The culpable homicide verdict was replaced with a murder conviction, and the case was referred back to the trial court for a sentencing hearing when it reconvened on 18 April 2016.

On 8 December 2015, it was announced Pistorius would continue to remain free on bail but under house arrest pending his appeal to the Constitutional Court. On 3 March 2016, it was announced Pistorius had been denied his right to appeal, and would next be due in court on 13 June 2016 to begin a five-day sentencing hearing for the murder conviction, concluding on 17 June 2016.

On 15 June 2016, the sentencing was adjourned by Judge Thokozile Masipa until 6 July 2016.

=== Second prison term ===
On 6 July 2016, Judge Thokozile Masipa sentenced Pistorius to six years' imprisonment for murder, rather than her original sentencing of five years' imprisonment for culpable homicide; once again he was incarcerated in the hospital wing at the Kgosi Mampuru II jail. It was anticipated that Pistorius would be eligible for release on parole, after serving three years of his sentence, in 2019.

On 7 August 2016, Pistorius was treated at Kalafong Hospital, in Pretoria, after sustaining minor injuries to his wrists after slipping in his cell. Media reports of Pistorius injuring himself intentionally were said to be "completely untrue" by his brother Carl, who added that he was "doing well given the circumstances".

On 21 July 2016, the National Prosecuting Authority (NPA) confirmed that it would appeal against Judge Thokozile Masipa's "shockingly lenient" 6-year jail sentence. The appeal hearing took place on 26 August 2016 and the bid to appeal the sentence was rejected by Masipa, who said that the NPA had "no reasonable prospect of success" of securing a longer prison sentence for Pistorius. The NPA was then given 21 days to take its appeal bid to the Supreme Court of Appeal (SCA). On 15 September 2016, it was confirmed that the NPA would make a fresh bid to extend Pistorius's jail sentence and would file papers to the SCA on 16 September. After this announcement, sources associated with Pistorius's family and the defence team accused Gerrie Nel and the NPA of pursuing a "personal vendetta" against Pistorius.

Pistorius was released from prison for four hours on 14 October 2016 through a compassionate leave license to attend the funeral service of his grandmother, who had died on 8 October 2016.

In November 2016, Pistorius was transferred from the Kgosi Mampuru jail to Atteridgeville Correctional Centre, which is smaller and better adapted for disabled prisoners because it has better facilities for inmates including bathtubs in cells. It also holds prisoners who are serving six-year sentences or less.

=== Sentence appeals and parole proceedings ===
The SCA heard the state's arguments appealing to extend Pistorius's sentence on 3 November 2017, with its final ruling being confirmed on 24 November 2017.

On 24 November 2017, the SCA increased Pistorius's jail sentence to 13 years and five months. Prosecutors had argued that the six-year term was too short. The SCA ruled his sentence be increased to 15 years, less time already served.

On 19 December 2017, it was confirmed that Pistorius had filed papers with the Constitutional Court to appeal the newly increased sentence and have his previous six-year sentence reinstated. On 9 April 2018 the appeal was dismissed by the courts; Pistorius was not to be eligible for parole until at least 2023.

In March 2023 it was announced that a parole board would consider an early release for Pistorius on 31 March, despite him serving just half of his sentence. Pistorius' release was opposed by Barry and June Steenkamp, Reeva Steenkamp's parents. Ahead of the hearing, June Steenkamp said Pistorius was "not remorseful or rehabilitated". According to his parole lawyer, Pistorius had been a model prisoner, a factor taken into account for parole. If he had been granted parole, the parole board would have had several options ranging from full parole to day parole, or correctional supervision. Pistorius was denied parole, with a lawyer for the Steenkamp family stating that "we were … advised at this point in time that it has been denied and it will be considered again in one year's time".

On 24 November 2023, it was announced that Pistorius was to be released on parole. Reeva Steenkamp's mother, June Steenkamp, did not oppose his parole because she "simply cannot muster the energy to face him again at this stage".

Pistorius was released on parole on 5 January 2024 with conditions in place until his sentence expires on 5 December 2029.

=== Steenkamp Foundation ===
Reeva Steenkamp's mother told the hosts of the British television programme This Morning that she had forgiven Pistorius during his trial. She founded the Reeva Steenkamp Foundation to help prevent "similar cases" in the future.

== Sporting career ==
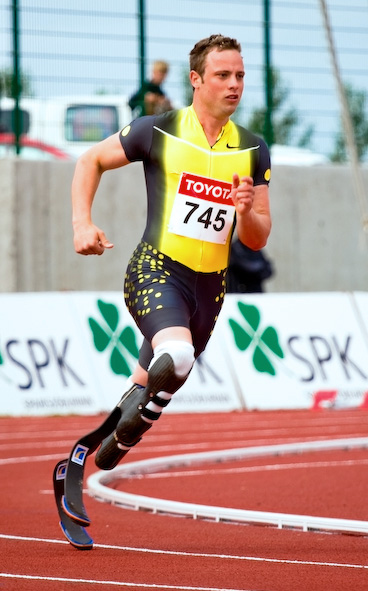
Pistorius taking part in the Landsmót ungmennafélags Íslands in Kópavogur, Iceland, in July 2007

Pistorius competed in T44 (single below-knee amputees) events though he is classified in T43 (double below-knee amputee). Sometimes referred to as the "Blade Runner" (after the science fiction film of the same name) and "the fastest man on no legs", Pistorius took part in the 2004 Summer Paralympics in Athens and came third overall in the T44 100-metre event. Despite falling in the preliminary round for the 200 metres, he qualified for the final. He went on to win the final in a world record time of 21.97 seconds, beating a pair of American runners, Marlon Shirley and Brian Frasure, both with single amputations.

In 2005, Pistorius finished sixth in the nondisabled South African Championships over 400 metres with a world-record time of 47.34 seconds, and at the Paralympic World Cup in the same year, he won gold in the 100 metres and 200 metres, beating his previous 200-metre world record. At the 2006 IPC Athletics World Championships, Pistorius won gold in the 100-, 200- and 400-metre events, breaking the world record over 200 metres. On 17 March 2007, he set a disability sports world record for the 400 metres (46.56 seconds) at the South African Senior Athletics Championships in Durban; and at the Nedbank Championships for the Physically Disabled held in Johannesburg in April 2007. He became the world record holder of the 100- and 200-metre events with times of 10.91 and 21.58 seconds, respectively.

Pistorius was invited by the IAAF to take part in what would have been his first international nondisabled event, the 400-metre race at the IAAF Grand Prix in Helsinki, Finland, in July 2005. He was unable to attend, however, because of school commitments. On 13 July 2007, Pistorius ran in the 400-metre race at Rome's Golden Gala and finished second in run B with a time of 46.90 seconds, behind Stefano Braciola who ran 46.72 seconds. This was a warm-up for his appearance at the 400 metres at the Norwich Union British Grand Prix at the Don Valley Stadium in Sheffield on 15 July 2007. As American Olympic champion Jeremy Wariner stumbled at the start of the race and stopped running, Pistorius took seventh place in a field of eight in wet conditions with a time of 47.65 seconds. However, he was later disqualified for running outside his lane. The race was won by American Angelo Taylor with a time of 45.25 seconds. Pistorius had ambitions of competing in other non-disabled events. In particular, he had set his sights on competing at the 2008 Summer Olympic Games in Beijing, China, but was not selected by the South African Olympic Committee.

=== Dispute over prostheses ===
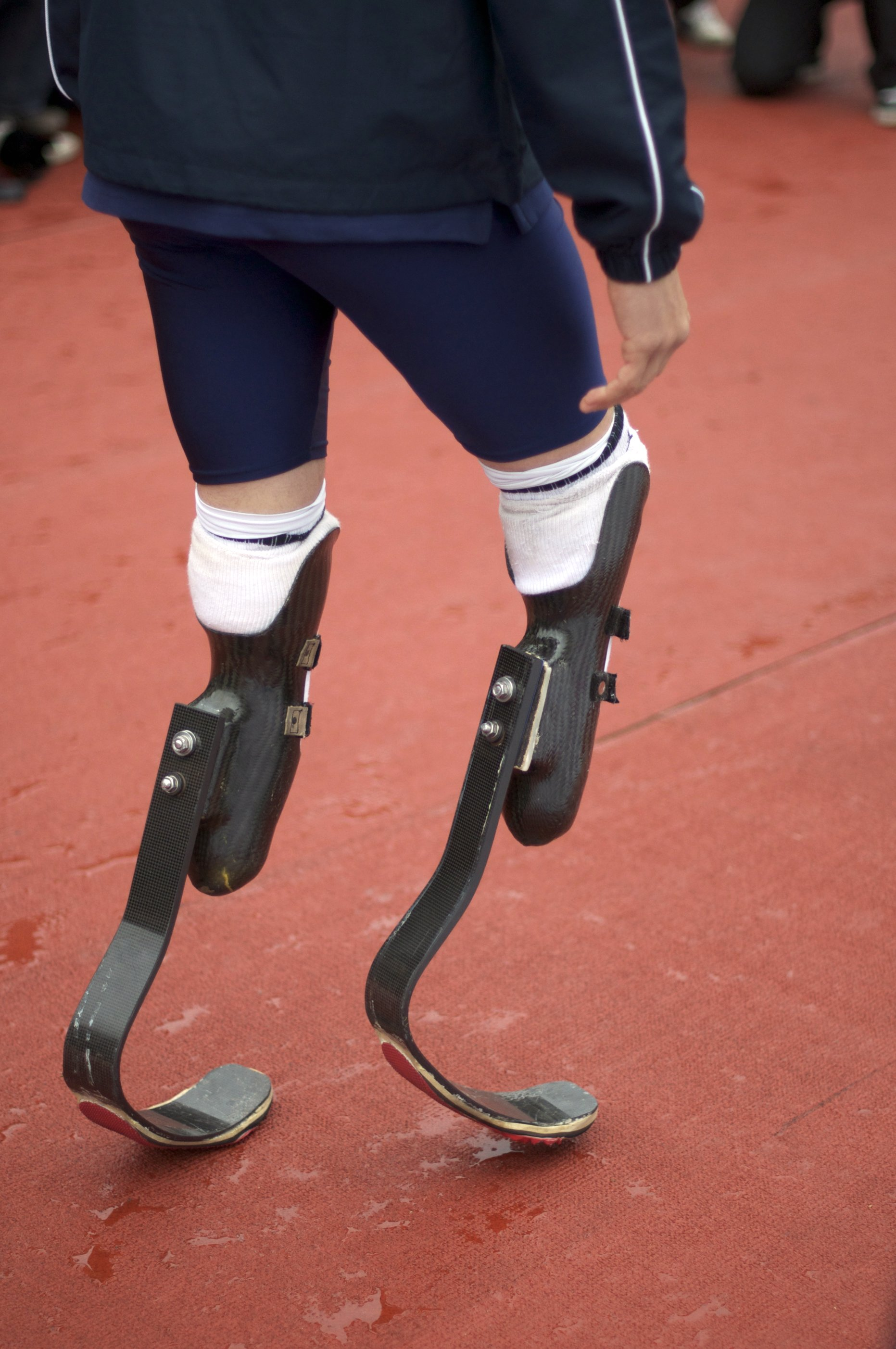
Pistorius in his prostheses at an International Paralympic Day event in Trafalgar Square, London, on 8 September 2011

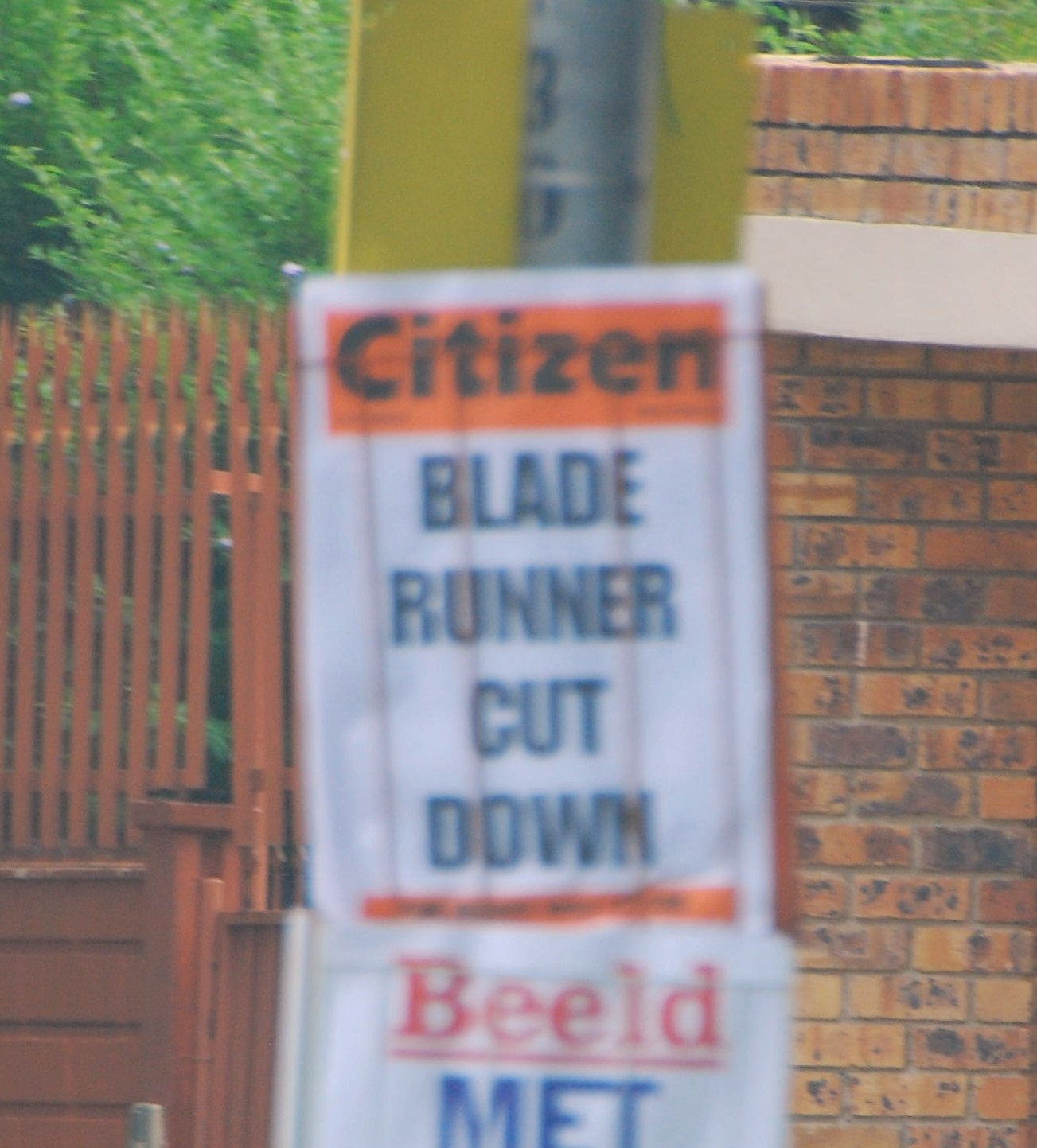
The South African newspaper The Citizen announcing the IAAF's decision to ban Pistorius from its competitions – photographed in Johannesburg on 16 January 2008

Pistorius has been the subject of criticism because of claims that his artificial limbs give him an advantage over runners with natural ankles and feet. He runs with J-shaped carbon-fibre prostheses called the "Flex-Foot Cheetah" developed by biomedical engineer Van Phillips and manufactured by Össur.

On 26 March 2007, the IAAF amended its competition rules to include a ban on the use of "any technical device that incorporates springs, wheels, or any other element that provides a user with an advantage over another athlete not using such a device". The IAAF stated that the amendment was not specifically aimed at Pistorius. To decide whether he was running with an unfair advantage, the IAAF monitored his track performances using high-definition cameras to film his race against Italian club runners in Rome on 13 July, and his 400 metres in Sheffield on 15 July 2007, at which he placed last.

In November 2007, Pistorius was invited to take part in a series of scientific tests at the German Sports University Cologne under the guidance of Professor of Biomechanics Dr Peter Brüggemann in conjunction with Elio Locatelli, who was responsible for all technical issues in the IAAF. After two days' tests, Brüggemann reported on his findings on behalf of the IAAF. The report claimed that Pistorius's limbs used 25% less energy than runners with complete natural legs running at the same speed, and that they led to less vertical motion combined with 30% less mechanical work for lifting the body. In December, Brüggemann told Die Welt newspaper that Pistorius "has considerable advantages over athletes without prosthetic limbs who were tested by us. It was more than just a few percentage points. I did not expect it to be so clear." Because of these findings, on 14 January 2008, the IAAF ruled Pistorius's prostheses ineligible for use in competitions conducted under the IAAF rules, including the 2008 Summer Olympic Games. Pistorius called the decision "premature and highly subjective" and pledged to continue fighting for his dream. His manager, Peet van Zylm, said his appeal would be based on advice from experts in the United States who had said that the report "did not take enough variables into consideration".

Pistorius subsequently appealed against the decision to the Court of Arbitration for Sport (CAS) in Lausanne, Switzerland, and appeared before the tribunal at the end of April 2008. After a two-day hearing, on 16 May 2008, CAS upheld Pistorius's appeal and the IAAF council decision was revoked with immediate effect. The CAS panel unanimously determined that Brüggemann had tested Pistorius's biomechanics only at full speed when he was running in a straight line (unlike a real 400-metre race); that the report did not consider the disadvantages that Pistorius has at the start and acceleration phases of the race; and that overall there was no evidence that he had any net advantage over non-disabled athletes. In response to the announcement, Pistorius said: "My focus throughout this appeal has been to ensure that disabled athletes be given the chance to compete and compete fairly with non-disabled athletes. I look forward to continuing my quest to qualify for the Olympics."

=== Attempts to qualify for 2008 Summer Olympic Games ===
To have a chance of representing South Africa at the 2008 Summer Olympic Games in Beijing in the individual 400-metre race, Pistorius had to attain the Olympic "A" standard time of 45.55 seconds; the "B" qualifying time of 45.95 seconds, which applies if no other athlete from his country achieved the faster time, did not apply. Each national athletics federation is permitted to enter three athletes in an event if the "A" standard is met, and only one athlete if the "B" standard is met. However, he was eligible for selection as a member of the relay squad without qualifying. His best chance was to try for a time of close to 46 seconds to make the 4 × 400-metre relay team. However, he said: "If I make the team I don't want to be the reserve for the relay, I want to be in the top four. I want to bring something to the race and make the relay stronger." To give him a chance of making the South African Olympic team, selectors delayed naming the team until 17 July.

On 2 July 2008, Pistorius competed in the 400 metres in the B race of the Notturna International in Milan but was "disappointed" when at 47.78 seconds his fourth-place finish was over the minimum Olympic qualifying time. His performance on 11 July 2008 at the Rome Golden Gala was an improvement of more than a second, though his sixth-place time of 46.62 seconds in the B race was still over the Olympic qualification time. Nonetheless, he was pleased with his performance, commenting that he felt he could improve on it.

On 15 July 2008, IAAF general secretary Pierre Weiss commented that the world athletics body preferred that the South African Olympic Committee not select Pistorius for its 4 × 400 metres relay team "for reasons of safety", saying that Pistorius could cause "serious damage" and risk the physical safety of himself and other athletes if he ran in the main pack of the relay. Pistorius branded this as the IAAF's "last desperate attempt" to get him not to qualify, and threatened legal action if the IAAF did not confirm that it had no objections to his participation in the relay. The IAAF responded by issuing a statement saying that Pistorius was welcome to seek qualification for the Olympics and future competitions under IAAF rules: "The IAAF fully respects the recent CAS decision regarding the eligibility of Oscar Pistorius to compete in IAAF competitions, and certainly has no wish to influence the South African Olympic Committee, who has full authority to select a men's 4 × 400m relay team for the Beijing Olympics."

Coming third, with a personal best time of 46.25 seconds, at the Spitzen Leichtathletik meeting in Lucerne, Switzerland, on 16 July 2008, Pistorius failed to qualify for the 400 metres at the 2008 Summer Olympic Games by 0.70 seconds. Athletics South Africa later announced that he would also not be selected for the 4 × 400 metres relay team as four other runners had better times. Pistorius would not have been the debut leg amputee to participate in the Olympic Games as George Eyser had competed earlier. Pistorius's compatriot Natalie du Toit, a swimmer whose left leg was amputated above the knee after a traffic accident, was the debut amputee Olympian, at the 2008 Summer Olympic Games. Asked about the possibility of the IAAF offering him a wild card to take part in the Olympics, Pistorius responded: "I do not believe that I would accept. If I have to take part in the Beijing Games I should do it because I qualified." He expressed a preference for focusing on qualification for the 2012 Summer Olympic Games in London, stating that it was a more realistic target as "sprinters usually reach their peak between 26 and 29. I will be 25 in London and I'll also have two, three years' preparation."

=== 2008 Summer Paralympics ===
Pistorius participated in the 2008 Summer Paralympics in Beijing in the 100, 200 and 400 metres (T44). On 9 September, in the heats of the 100 metres, he set a Paralympic record with his time of 11.16 seconds. Later, following a slow start, he rallied to snatch gold from the United States' Jerome Singleton in the 100 metres in a time of 11.17 seconds, 0.03 seconds ahead of the silver medallist. Four days later, on 13 September, the defending Paralympic champion in the 200-metre sprint won his second gold in the event in a time of 21.67 seconds, setting another Paralympic record. He completed a hat-trick by winning gold in the 400 metres in a world-record time of 47.49 seconds on 16 September, calling it "a memory that will stay with me for the rest of my life".

=== 2011 and qualification for 2012 Summer Olympic Games ===
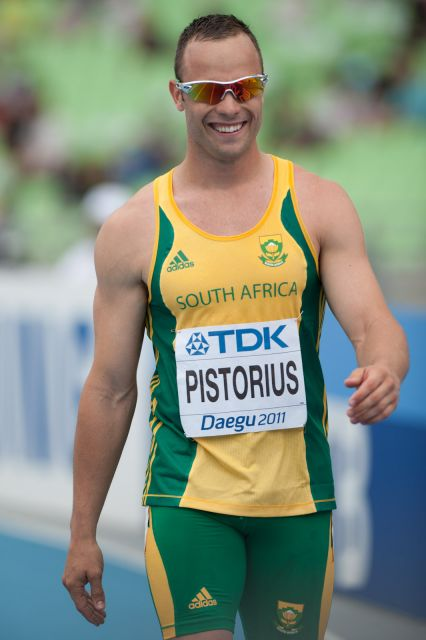
Pistorius during the 2011 World Championships in Athletics in Daegu, South Korea

In January 2011, a slimmer, trimmer Pistorius won three IPC Athletics World titles in New Zealand but was beaten for the first time in seven years in the 100 metres by Jerome Singleton. He subsequently won the T44 400 metres in 47.28 seconds and the 100 metres in 11.04 seconds at the BT Paralympic World Cup in May to reassert himself as the world's leading Paralympic sprinter.

Pistorius competed across a number of non-disabled races in the summer of 2011 and posted three times under 46 seconds, but it was at the 19th Internazionale di Atletica Sports Solidarity Meeting in Lignano, Italy, on 19 July, that he set a personal best of 45.07 seconds in the 400 metres, attaining the World Championships and Olympic Games "A" standard qualification mark.

Pistorius won the 400-metres event with a posted time that ranked him as 15th fastest in the world.

On 8 August 2011, it was announced that Pistorius had been included in the South African team for the World Championships in Daegu, South Korea, and had been selected for the 400-metre and the 4 × 400 metre relay squad. In the heats of the 400 metres, Pistorius ran in 45.39 seconds and qualified for the semi-final. However, in the semi-final, he ran 46.19 seconds and was eliminated.

In the heats of the 4 × 400 metres relay, Pistorius ran the opening leg as South Africa advanced to the finals with a national record time of 2 minutes 59.21 seconds. However, he was not selected to run in the finals since he had the slowest split time of 46.20 seconds. This caused a controversy, as the first leg is normally Pistorius's slowest since it requires a start from blocks, and he was restricted to the first leg by Athletics South Africa "on safety grounds". He initially tweeted: "Haven't been included in final. Pretty gutted.", but later added: "Well done to the SA 4 × 400 m team. Was really hard watching, knowing I deserved to be part of it [sic]." Pistorius still won the silver medal because he ran in the heats, becoming the first amputee to win a non-disabled world track medal. Reflecting on his World Championship debut, Pistorius said: "I really enjoyed the whole experience. I ran my second fastest time ever in the heats and was really pleased to have reached the semi-finals. In the relay, I was unbelievably chuffed to have broken the South African record, and hopefully my name will stay on that for a long time to come."

On 4 July 2012, the South African Sports Confederation and Olympic Committee (SASCOC) announced that Pistorius had been included in the Olympic team for the 400-metre and the 4 × 400 metres relay races.

=== 2012 Summer Olympic Games ===
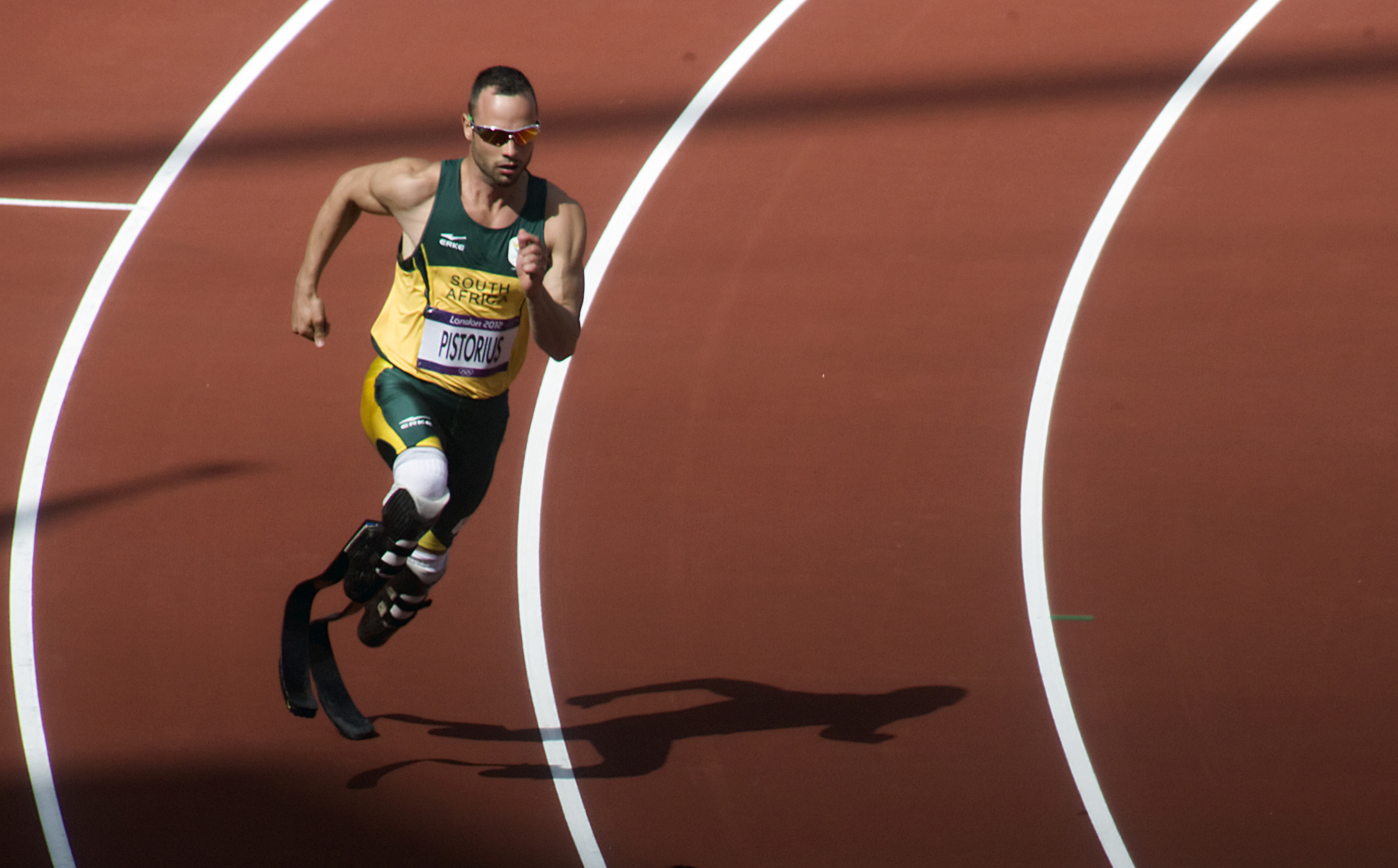
Pistorius running in the Olympic Stadium during the heats of the 400 metres at the 2012 Summer Olympics on 4 August

At the 2012 Summer Olympic Games on 4 August 2012, Pistorius became the debut amputee runner to compete at an Olympic Games. In the 400-metre race, he took second place in the first heat of five runners, finishing with a time of 45.44 seconds (his best time that season) to advance to the semi-finals on 5 August. He ran in the second semi-final, where he finished eighth and last with a time of 46.54 seconds.

In the first semi-final of the 4 × 400 metres relay race on 9 August, the second leg runner of the South African team, Ofentse Mogawane, fell and was injured before reaching the third leg runner, Pistorius. South Africa was passed into the final on appeal to the IAAF, due to interference by Vincent Kiilu, the Kenyan athlete who downed Mogawane. The South African relay team eventually finished eighth out of the field of nine in the final on 10 August. However, it established a season's best time for the team of 3 minutes 3.46 seconds, with Pistorius running the final leg in 45.9 seconds. Pistorius was chosen to carry the South African flag for the closing ceremony.

=== 2012 Summer Paralympics ===
Pistorius also carried the flag at the opening ceremony of the 2012 Summer Paralympics on 29 August. He entered the T44 classification men's 100 metres, 200 metres and 400 metres races, and the T42–T46 4 × 100 metres relay.

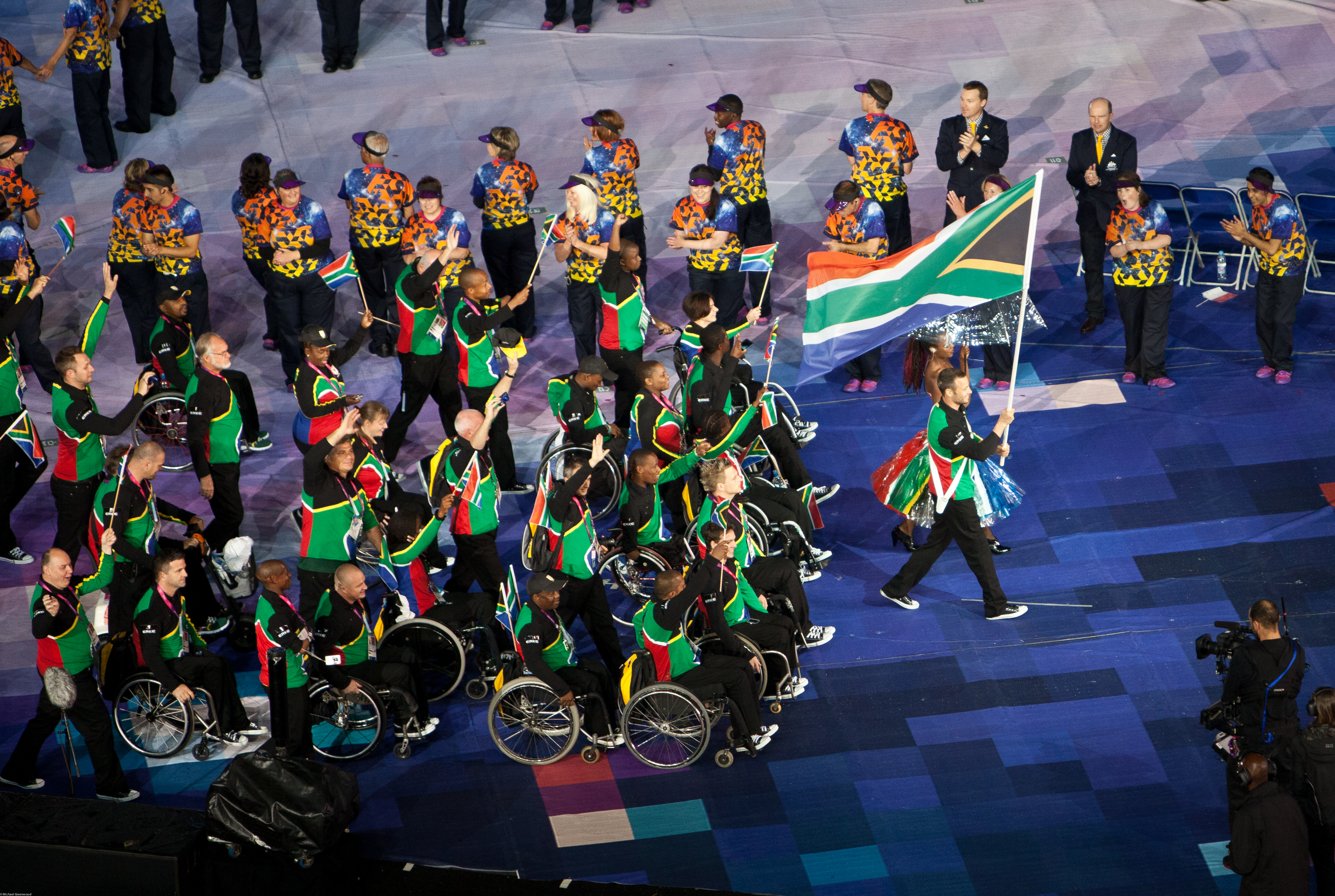
Pistorius carrying the flag at the opening ceremony of the 2012 Summer Paralympics

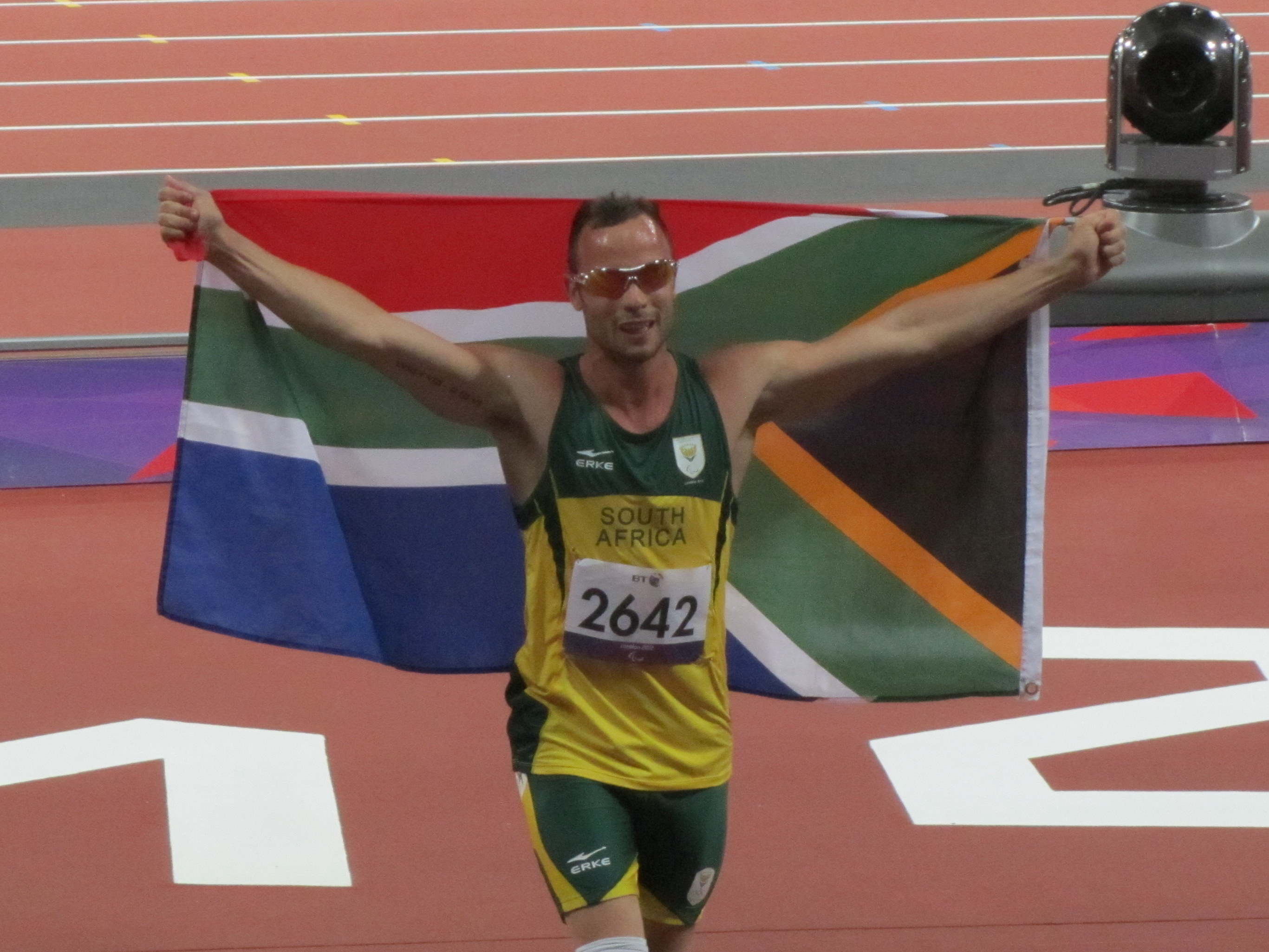
Pistorius after winning the 400m T44 final

In the 200-metre competition, Pistorius established a new T43 world record of 21.30 seconds in his heat on 1 September, but he was defeated in the final the next day by Alan Oliveira of Brazil. Pistorius took silver, and subsequently complained about the length of Oliveira's blades. He later apologised for the timing of his remarks, but not the content of his complaint. The IPC confirmed the length of Oliveira's blades were proportional to his body, with all the finalists measured before the race. The IPC also confirmed that Pistorius had raised the issue of blade length with it six weeks prior to the race. SASCOC issued a statement welcoming Pistorius's apology for his outburst, declared its full support for him and promised to assist him in discussions with the IPC about the issue of lengthened prostheses after the conclusion of the Games. The IPC expressed willingness to engage with Pistorius about the issue. Australian runner Jack Swift and American runner Jerome Singleton also expressed support for Pistorius's position.

Pistorius won a team gold medal on 5 September, running the anchor leg as part of the South African 4 × 100 metres relay team setting a team world record time of 41.78 seconds. His Beijing Olympics 100-metre title was defended with a season's best time of 11.17 seconds but was succeeded by Great Britain's Jonnie Peacock. On 8 September, the last full day of competition, Pistorius won gold in the T44 400 metres with a time of 46.68 seconds, breaking the Paralympic record.

== Achievements ==
=== Disability sports events ===
Time (seconds)	Result	Date	Event
100 m (class T44)
10.91 (world record)	Gold	4 April 2007	Nedbank Championships for the Physically Disabled; Germiston, Gauteng, South Africa
11.16	Bronze	17–28 September 2004	2004 Summer Paralympics; Athens, Greece
11.17	Gold	9 September 2008	2008 Summer Paralympics; Beijing, People's Republic of China
11.23	Gold	15 May 2005	2005 Visa Paralympic World Cup; Manchester, England, United Kingdom
11.32	Gold	5 September 2006	2006 IPC Athletics World Championships; Assen, Netherlands
11.34	Silver	26 January 2011	2011 IPC Athletics World Championships; Christchurch, New Zealand
11.42	Gold	6 June 2008	Sportfest; Duisburg, Germany
11.48	Gold	1 June 2008	Dutch Open National Championships; Emmeloord, Netherlands
11.62	Gold	2004	United States
200 m (class T44)
21.52 (21.30 in semi-final – T43 world record)	Silver	2 September 2012	2012 Summer Paralympics; London, England, United Kingdom
21.58 (world record)	Gold	5 April 2007	Nedbank Championships for the Physically Disabled; Germiston, Gauteng, South Africa
21.67 (Paralympic record)	Gold	13 September 2008	2008 Summer Paralympics; Beijing, People's Republic of China
21.77	Gold	15 June 2008	German Open National Championships; Berlin, Germany
21.80 (21.66 in semi-final – world record)	Gold	8 September 2006	2006 IPC Athletics World Championships; Assen, Netherlands
21.80	Gold	24 January 2011	2011 IPC Athletics World Championships; Christchurch, New Zealand
21.97	Gold	17–28 September 2004	2004 Summer Paralympics; Athens, Greece
22.01 (world record)	Gold	15 May 2005	2005 Visa Paralympic World Cup; Manchester, England, United Kingdom
22.04	Gold	31 May 2008	Dutch Open National Championships; Emmeloord, Netherlands
22.71	Gold	2004	USA Endeavor Games USA
400 m (class T44)
46.68 (Paralympic record)	Gold	8 September 2012	2012 Summer Paralympics; London, England, United Kingdom
47.49 (world record)	Gold	16 September 2008	2008 Summer Paralympics; Beijing, People's Republic of China
47.92	Gold	1 June 2008	Dutch Open National Championships; Emmeloord, Netherlands
48.37	Gold	29 January 2011	2011 IPC Athletics World Championships; Christchurch, New Zealand
49.42	Gold	4 September 2006	2006 IPC Athletics World Championships; Assen, Netherlands
4 × 100 m relay (classes T42–T46)
41.78 (world record)	Gold	5 September 2012	2012 Summer Paralympics; London, England, United Kingdom
42.80	Gold	29 January 2011	2011 IPC Athletics World Championships; Christchurch, New Zealand

=== Non-disabled sports events ===
Time (seconds)	Result	Date	Event
400 m
45.07 (personal best)	First place	19 July 2011	Meeting Internazionale di Atletica Sports Solidarity; Lignano, Italy
45.44 (seasonal best)	16th in Round 1 (out of 51 athletes)	4 August 2012	2012 Summer Olympics; London, United Kingdom
45.52	Silver	29 June 2012	2012 African Championships in Athletics; Porto-Novo, Benin
46.56	Silver	17 March 2007	2007 Senior South African National Championships; Durban, South Africa
4 × 400 m relay
2 min 59.21 s (heats)	Silver	1 September 2011	2011 IAAF World Championships in Athletics; Daegu, South Korea
3 min 04.01 s	Silver	1 July 2012	2012 African Championships in Athletics; Porto-Novo, Benin

=== Other awards and accolades ===
In 2006, Pistorius was conferred the Order of Ikhamanga in Bronze (OIB) by then President of South Africa, Thabo Mbeki, for outstanding achievement in sports. On 9 December 2007, Pistorius was awarded the BBC Sports Personality of the Year Helen Rollason Award, which is conferred for outstanding courage and achievement in the face of adversity. This was later revoked following his conviction for murder.

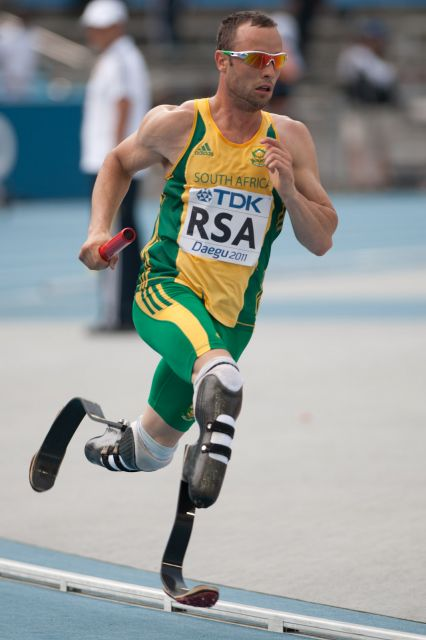
Pistorius at the 2011 World Championships in Athletics in Daegu, South Korea

In May 2008, Pistorius made the "Time 100" – Time magazine's annual list of the world's most influential people – appearing third in the "Heroes & Pioneers" section. Erik Weihenmayer, the first blind person to climb Mount Everest, wrote in an essay that Pistorius was "on the cusp of a paradigm shift in which disability becomes ability, disadvantage becomes advantage. Yet we mustn't lose sight of what makes an athlete great. It's too easy to credit Pistorius's success to technology. Through birth or circumstance, some are given certain gifts, but it's what one does with those gifts, the hours devoted to training, the desire to be the best, that is at the true heart of a champion." In 2012, he made the list again.

In February 2012, Pistorius was awarded the Laureus World Sports Award for Sportsperson of the Year with a Disability for 2012. On 22 August 2012, he was honoured with the unveiling of a large mural depicting his achievements in the town of Gemona, Italy.

On 9 September 2012, Pistorius was shortlisted by the IPC for the Whang Youn Dai Achievement Award as a competitor "who is fair, honest and is uncompromising in his or her values and prioritises the promotion of the Paralympic Movement above personal recognition". According to director Craig Spence, he was nominated by an unnamed external organisation from South Korea. The award went to two other athletes.

After the 2012 Summer Paralympics, the University of Strathclyde in Glasgow announced it would confer on Pistorius, among others, an honorary doctorate. In February 2015, following his conviction for culpable homicide, the university revoked the honorary degree.

== Sponsorship and charitable activities ==
In 2012, Pistorius had sponsorship deals worth US$2 million a year with Össur, BT, Nike, Oakley and Thierry Mugler. He also participated as a model in advertising campaigns.

Following the murder charge, sponsors were initially hesitant to abandon him, but after a week sponsors began to withdraw their support.

In 2008, Pistorius collaborated in the release of a music CD called Olympic Dream. Produced in Italy, it consists of disco remixes of music pieces that Pistorius finds inspirational, and two tracks written for him, "Olympic Dream" and "Run Boy Run", for which he provided voiceovers. Part of the CD's proceeds of sale went to charity. Pistorius also actively supports the Mineseeker Foundation, a charity that works to raise awareness for landmine victims and has a support programme to provide prostheses for survivors.

== Personal life ==
Pistorius is a nephew of South African psychological profiler Micki Pistorius.

Pistorius has three visible tattoos: the dates of his mother's birth and death ("LVIII V VIII – II III VI" – 8 May 1958 – 6 March 2002) are tattooed on the inside of his right arm; on his back is the Bible verse 1 Corinthians 9:26–27 which begins, "I do not run like a man running aimlessly"; on his right arm are the Olympic rings and olive wreath. He lived in Silverwoods Country Estate, Pretoria. The house was sold in June 2014. Aside from running, his interests include architecture, motorcycling, playing the electric guitar, and breeding race horses.

In February 2009, Pistorius was seriously injured when he was thrown from a boat in an accident on the Vaal River near Johannesburg. He was airlifted to Milpark Hospital, where he underwent surgery to repair broken facial bones, including his nose and jaw. There were initial concerns about his fitness, but he recovered fully. However, the accident affected his training and running schedule for that year.

=== Golf ===
In 2010, Pistorius played in the Laureus World Sports Awards Golf Challenge at the Abu Dhabi Golf Club in Abu Dhabi, United Arab Emirates and the Help-net Fund Celebrity Charity Golf Day. He was scheduled as an amateur golfer in the 2012 Alfred Dunhill Links Championship held at St Andrews, Carnoustie and Kingsbarns in Scotland. Pistorius has a 21 handicap in South Africa, but played off an 18 handicap for the Championship.

=== Publications and media appearances ===
Pistorius's autobiography, Dream Runner, was published in Italian in 2007 with Gianni Merlo, a journalist with La Gazzetta dello Sport. An English version titled Blade Runner was released in 2008.

In 2010, Pistorius appeared on L'isola dei famosi, an Italian version of Celebrity Survivor. On 7 January 2012, he appeared as a special guest on the Italian version of Dancing with the Stars called Ballando con le Stelle at Auditorium Rai in Rome, where he danced a tango with Annalisa Longo to ABBA's "The Winner Takes It All".

On 9 October 2012, Pistorius appeared on The Tonight Show with Jay Leno. He was also scheduled to appear on Piers Morgan Tonight and the Larry King Now show at later dates.

== In popular culture ==
An unofficial biopic based on public records titled Oscar Pistorius: Blade Runner Killer, was aired on 18 November 2017 on South African TV. The movie was made without the consent of either the Pistorius or Steenkamp families. The Pistorius family threatened legal action against Lifetime Movies, the American television network that produced the movie. However, the lawsuit never went to trial.

In 2018, Amazon Prime released a four-part documentary series titled Pistorius on its video service. A four-part documentary titled The Life and Trials of Oscar Pistorius aired on ESPN+ in 2020.

Pistorius has been referenced several times in the American adult animated sitcom Family Guy. In the season 13 episode "#Jolo," Joe Swanson claims to be in possession of "the gun that no-legged sprinter used to kill his girlfriend." Pistorius is also mentioned twice in the show's sixteenth season. In the episode "Follow the Money," Joe excitedly calls out "Pistorius" while playing quarters. Then, in the episode "HTTPete," Peter Griffin refers to a situation as being "worse than when [he] was roommates with Oscar Pistorius." The ensuing cutaway gag parodies Pistorius shooting Steenkamp in the bathroom.

The murder of Steenkamp was also brought up in season 4, episode 13 of New Girl In which Jess mentions that “If that South African who murdered his girlfriend can run on his legs, we can walk in heels”.

Pistorius was also alluded to as "Tinktink" in a 2009 comedy special by American comedian Katt Williams, in which Williams commends him for not giving up and winning a "Footrace against competitors while not even having any feet."

Pistorius's disability was referenced by American rapper Lil Dicky in his 2015 single, "Professional Rapper". The lyrics include a play on words for "no feat" used as a homophone for "no feet".

== Bibliography ==
- Davies, Gareth A. (23 May 2007), "My sport: Oscar Pistorius", The Daily Telegraph, London
- Knight, Tom (11 July 2007), "Pistorius is no novelty sprinter", The Daily Telegraph, London, p. S12
- "Mr. Oscar "Oz" Pistorius", Who's Who of Southern Africa, 24.com, archived from the original on 27 April 2009
- Oscar Pistorius, Össur
- Oscar Pistorius competitive highlights, Össur

Awards and achievements
Preceded by (Germany) Verena Bentele	Laureus World Sportsperson with a Disability of the Year; 2012	Succeeded by (Brazil) Daniel Dias
