= S v Mampa =

In S v Mampa (1985), an important case in South African criminal procedure, the accused had been convicted in a magistrate's court of two charges of culpable homicide.

The charges arose from a motor accident in which two passengers in the car in which the accused was driving were killed.

The court on review held that the accused's conduct could not be separated into different acts and that he should have been charged with one count of culpable homicide in which reference was made to both the deceased persons.

The accused did not foresee the deaths and did not reconcile himself to the possibility of death ensuing.

The conviction was accordingly set aside and replaced with one conviction in respect of both deceased.
