= Ashraf Garda =

- Born: Johannesburg, Gauteng, South Africa
- Known for: Radio presenting, television presenting, journalism, Motivational Speaking
- Spouse: Jamela Garda

Ashraf Garda is a media host in South Africa. He is a radio presenter on SAfm and hosts the show "Media@SAfm", as well as SAfm's "Afternoon Talk" and became the host of the South African Broadcasting Corporation's investigative program "Special Assignment" in April 2011.

During the 2010 World Cup Ashraf provided analysis on the games as well as the social impact of the World Cup on CNN, Al Jazeera, CBC Canada and SABC 2's Morning Live.

== Biography ==
Born in Johannesburg, South Africa on 4 June 1962. Ashraf lived with his parents in Fietas until they had to relocate to Lenasia due to the Group Areas Act of the South African Apartheid regime. He married Jamela Cassim and together they started a business retailing textiles in the Oriental Plaza, called "Fabric Fantasy". Ashraf's entry into radio began when he hosted sports shows on community radio stations "Radio az-Zaheer" and later "the Voice,95.4fm".

== Radio ==
Ashraf landed the sports news role on the popular South African radio station 5fm and later on SAfm. Garda now hosts the "Afternoon Talk" show from 2-4pm daily and does the Media@SAfm show every Sunday 9-11am.

== Television ==
Garda often guest hosted "Interface", SABC's leading current affairs show and is the host of SABC's multi award-winning investigative documentary program "Special Assignment".

== Awards ==
2007 South African Breweries Sports insert of the year (Safm)

2012 Turquoise Harmony Institute:Ubuntu lecture and dialogue award (media award)
