= Thokozile Masipa =

South African judge

The Honourable Thokozile Masipa

Judge in the Gauteng Division of the High Court of South Africa
- Incumbent
- Assumed office 1 December 1998
- Nominated by: Judicial Service Commission
- Appointed by: President Nelson Mandela

Personal details
- Born: 16 October 1947 (age 78) Soweto, Union of South Africa
- Spouse: Makhutla Wilson Masipa
- Children: 2
- Education: University of South Africa
- Occupation: Judge
- Profession: Jurist

Thokozile Matilda Masipa (born 16 October 1947) is a judge in the Gauteng Division of the High Court of South Africa. She was the presiding judge in the 2014 trial of Oscar Pistorius for the killing of Reeva Steenkamp. Her judgement of not guilty of murder was later overturned on appeal.

== Early life and education ==
Masipa was born and grew up in Orlando East, Soweto, Johannesburg, South Africa the eldest of 10 children. After matriculating from Immaculata High School in the Alexandra township in 1966, she obtained a BA degree specialising in Social Work in 1974 and a LLB in 1990 from the University of South Africa. She was admitted as an advocate in 1991.

== Career ==
In the past, people would stay away from the court and rather sort things out themselves. Now they see black people and women on the Bench and they say maybe, if you want justice, the high court is where you go.

— Judge Thokozile Masipa, Courting Justice (2008)

Prior to her law career, Masipa worked as a social worker and as a crime reporter, which led to her interest in law. She worked for The World, Post and The Sowetan newspapers and edited the Queen women's supplement of Pace magazine.

In 1998, she was appointed as a judge in the Transvaal Provincial Division (as it was then known) of the High Court of South Africa, becoming the second black woman to be appointed as a judge in the High Court after Lucy Mailula, who was appointed to the Transvaal Provincial Division of the Supreme Court (as it was then known) in 1995. Masipa has also served in Gauteng's consumer court tribunal, the Estate Agents Board, and the Electoral Court of South Africa.

In a 2003 interview with the Judicial Service Commission, Masipa supported greater transparency and interaction with the media to aid the public's understanding of the judicial process. She is one of the seven female South African judges featured in Courting Justice, a 2008 documentary film directed by Jane Lipman.

== Notable judgements ==
Masipa contributed to case law on the constitutional duties of local government related to housing in her 2009 ruling on Blue Moonlight Properties v Occupiers of Saratoga Avenue.

=== State v Oscar Pistorius ===
Masipa was the presiding judge in the trial of Oscar Pistorius for the murder of Reeva Steenkamp and several gun-related charges which commenced in the High Court in Pretoria on 3 March 2014. She appointed two assessors to assist her in the trial. According to the spokesperson for the South African judiciary, she was not specially assigned to the case because of her gender. Following her assignment to the high-profile case, her colleagues reportedly described her as respected, competent, eloquent, and reserved. According to media monitoring company ROi Africa, the majority of social media comments during the delivery of the verdict were critical of Judge Masipa after it became evident that Pistorius would not be found guilty of murder, a decision which was later overturned by the Appeal Court and a murder verdict recorded. Judge Masipa, who was given police protection from the beginning of the trial, was subjected to threats and personal attacks by people who disagreed with the verdict. In her new sentence for Pistorius based on a murder conviction, Masipa only increased his sentence by 1 year to 6 years. The 6-year sentence for murder was appealed by the National Prosecuting Authority and they convinced South Africa's Supreme Court of Appeal to increase the sentence. The sentence was set at the minimum length for a murder conviction in South Africa - 15 years.
