= S v Whitehead =

South African legal case

In S v Whitehead, an important case in South African criminal procedure, the appellants were convicted of public violence and culpable homicide and, in the case of the seventh appellant, of assault with intent to do grievous bodily harm.

The charges arose from an incident in which a group of men attacked striking municipal workers in a rural town. In the course of the attack, one of the workers was assaulted with a blunt instrument and later died of his injuries.

The court held that there was no infallible formula to determine whether or not there had been a duplication of convictions.

The various tests formulated by the courts were not rules of law, and nor were they exhaustive. They were simply useful practical guidelines and, if they failed to provide a satisfactory answer, the matter was correctly left to the common sense, wisdom, experience and sense of fairness of the court.

The court considered both tests and held that

- in respect of the evidence test, the evidence required to secure convictions on the public violence charge and the culpable homicide charge is different; and
- in respect of the single intention test, it cannot be said that a group of people had a common intention to commit culpable homicide since the fault element of this offense lay in negligence.

Thus there was no improper duplication of convictions.

When this case was taken on appeal, the court held that there was an improper duplication, but the case is still important to show how the court considered the question of improper duplications.
