= Prevention of Illegal Eviction from and Unlawful Occupation of Land Act, 1998 =

Parliament of South Africa
- Long title: To provide for the prohibition of unlawful eviction; to provide for procedures for the eviction of unlawful occupiers; and to repeal the Prevention of Illegal Squatting Act, 1951, and other obsolete laws; and to provide for matters incidental thereto.
- Citation: Act No. 19 of 1998
- Enacted by: Parliament of South Africa
- Assented to: 5 June 1998
- Status: In force

The Prevention of Illegal Eviction from and Unlawful Occupation of Land Act (PIE) is an act of the Parliament of South Africa which came into effect on 5 June, 1998, and which sets out to prevent arbitrary evictions.

In terms of the Constitution of South Africa, "No one may be evicted from their home, or have their home demolished, without an order of court made after considering all the relevant circumstances. No legislation may permit arbitrary evictions." PIE sets out the procedure to be followed in the case of such evictions. In Port Elizabeth Municipality v Various Occupiers, the Constitutional Court found that it "expressly requires the court to infuse elements of grace and compassion into the formal structures of the law."

== Eviction procedure ==
The eviction procedure excludes the rei vindicatio and other common-law remedies for the vindication of ownership rights. PIE has application also where the occupation was lawful to begin with but became unlawful later. Different procedures are set out under PIE for private owners, urgent applications and organs of state. Notice must be given at least fourteen calendar days prior to the hearing and should include the following:

- notification that proceedings have been instituted;
- the date of the hearing;
- the grounds for the proceedings; and
- information as to the right of appearance.

In the case of private owners, the court will consider the length of the occupation. If it has been less than six months, an eviction order will be made only if it is "just and equitable" to do so, "after considering all the relevant circumstances, including the rights and needs of the elderly, children, disabled persons and households headed by women." If it has been more than six months, the eviction order must still be just and equitable, but the circumstances to consider are compounded by the question of "whether land has been [...] or can reasonably be made available [...] for the relocation of the unlawful occupier." An exception to this is "where the land is sold in a sale of execution pursuant to a mortgage."

Urgent applications are granted where harm is eminent "to any person or property if the unlawful occupier is not forthwith evicted from the land", where "the likely hardship to the owner or any other affected person [...] exceeds the likely hardship to the unlawful occupier," and where no other effective remedy is available.

== Case law ==
In Residents of Joe Slovo Community v Thubelisha Homes, an application was brought by the authorities in Cape Town seeking the eviction of the persons in the Joe Slovo informal settlement under of PIE, arguing that the property was needed for the development of affordable housing for poor people. The High Court granted the order, and the residents appealed to the Constitutional Court on the grounds that they were not unlawful occupiers, having obtained the consent of the authorities, and therefore could not be evicted. The court granted the eviction but ordered that alternative accommodation be provided to the occupiers.

In Port Elizabeth Municipality v Various Occupiers, the municipality sought an eviction order against unlawful occupiers of municipal land, at the behest of adjacent land owners. The High Court granted the order, but on appeal to the Supreme Court of Appeals the order was quashed. The Municipality, in turn, appealed to the Constitutional Court, which held that there is no unqualified constitutional duty on local government to provide alternative housing in terms of PIE "In general terms, however," wrote Sachs J, "a court should be reluctant to grant an eviction against relatively settled occupiers unless it is satisfied that a reasonable alternative is available, even if only as an interim measure pending ultimate access to housing in the formal housing programme."

In Blue Moonlight Properties v Occupiers of Saratoga Avenue, the respondent, a private landowner, served a notice of eviction on the occupiers. They resisted, claiming protection under PIE and alleging that they were entitled to continue their occupation until the City of Johannesburg Metropolitan Municipality provided alternative accommodation. The City disputed this duty; the respondents argued that its policy was arbitrary and discriminatory. The issue, then, was whether private landowners are obliged to provide alternative accommodation to unlawful occupiers in terms of PIE, or whether the burden should fall on the city. The court found that it should balance the rights of property owners under the Constitution with those of indigents and occupiers, and ruled that the landowners' right to equality would be infringed if the state were to burden them with providing alternative accommodation without compensation. The obligation to provide access was the City's, and the city could not transfer that obligation to private landowners. The court ordered compensatory relief to Blue Moonlight Properties and found that the city was in breach of its constitutional duty to provide adequate housing on a progressive basis. It was obliged to make monetary payment each month until such accommodation was found.

== See also ==
- Eviction
- South African property law
