= Blue Moonlight Properties v Occupiers of Saratoga Avenue =

South African legal case

Blue Moonlight Properties 039 (Pty) Ltd v Occupiers of Saratoga Avenue and Another, an important case in South African property law, was heard in the Witwatersrand Local Division by Judge Thokozile Masipa on 30 May 2008, with judgment handed down on 12 September.

== Facts ==
The applicant brought eviction proceedings against the first respondents (the occupiers) in terms of the Prevention of Illegal Eviction from and Unlawful Occupation of Land Act (PIE) The occupiers made a counter-application for an order compelling the second respondent (the city) to provide a report within two months, stating what steps it would take to provide them with temporary emergency accommodation upon their eviction from the property, and what steps it would take to ensure access to adequate housing thereafter. It was argued that there would be no lawful and affordable alternative accommodation available to the occupiers in the event of their being evicted.

The City duly filed a report detailing its programmes and plans in regard to accommodation and land in general. The report was not prepared specifically for the present case and so did not deal specifically with the occupiers of Saratoga Avenue. At the hearing of the matter, the occupiers objected in limine that the city had been improperly joined to the proceedings. The City consented to the joinder on the basis that it would argue the question of joinder as part of the application against it.

== Judgment ==
In respect of the objection in limine, the court held that the question of whether or not it had been appropriate for the occupiers to join the city as a co-respondent could not be entertained, because a court order in which the city was joined had already been granted. That order stood until properly set aside by a court of competent jurisdiction. It did not therefore assist the city to submit that it consented to the joinder on the basis that it would argue the issue later. The objection in limine was dismissed.

The courts are obliged, under PIE, to "have regard to all relevant circumstances," and would in most eviction proceedings be unable to comply with this obligation without comprehensive and specific input from the municipality. The court held that in this case the city's report had failed to assist the court as it should have. The court required specific information in order to deal with the case before it; a generic answer was unacceptable.

The court held further that a municipality is obliged in eviction cases to inform the court of whether or not land had been made available, or could reasonably be made available, for the relocation of the affected unlawful occupiers (as opposed to unlawful occupiers in general). The municipality had to investigate diligently the circumstances of the case and consult with stakeholders where necessary, since the court's hands would be tied without a full and meaningful report from the municipality.

Accordingly, the court ordered the city to report within four weeks on the steps it had taken and could in future take to provide emergency shelter or other housing for the occupiers in the event of eviction. The matter was postponed sine die.

== See also ==
- South African property law
