= Gerrie Nel =

South African lawyer

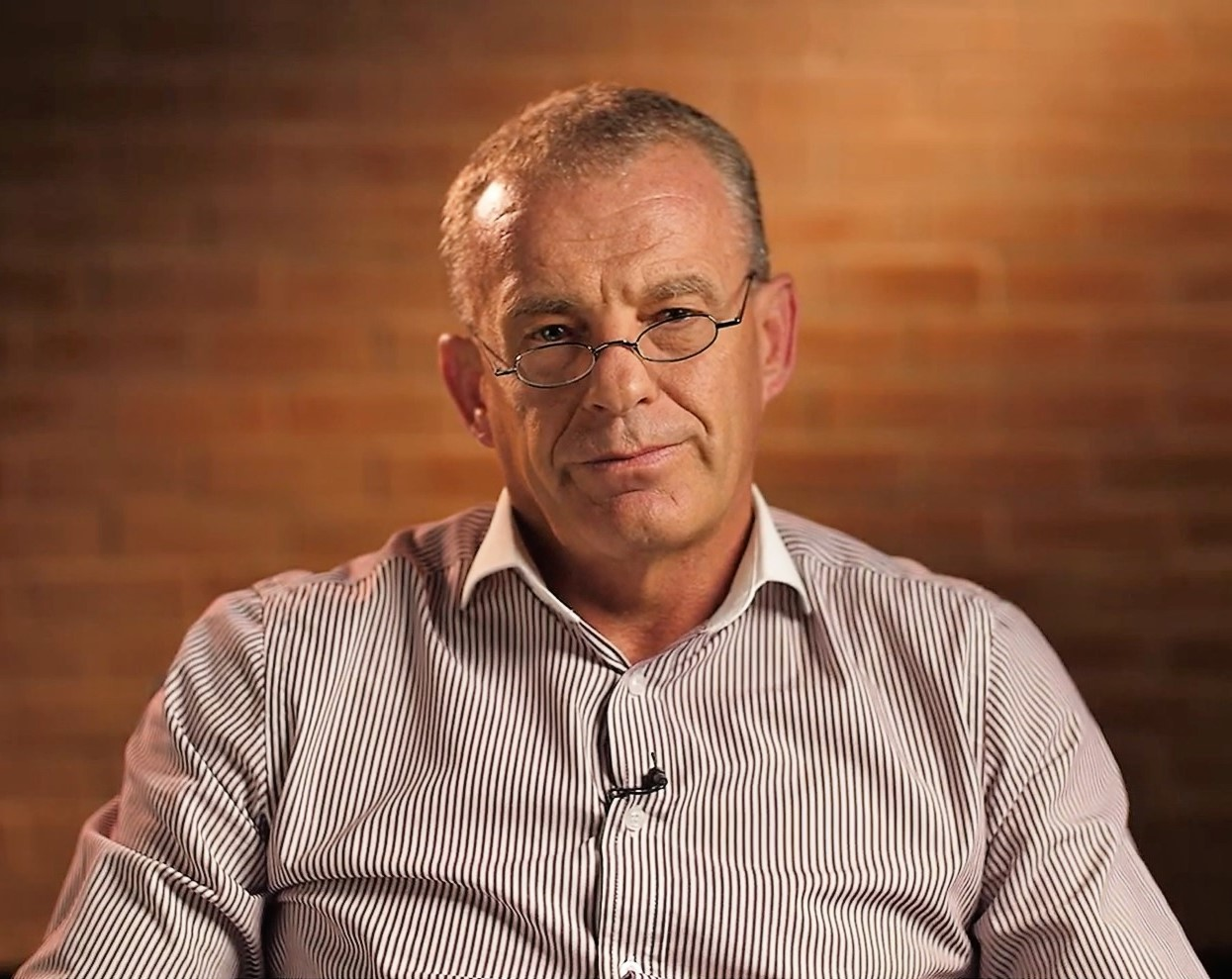
Nel in 2019

Gerhard C. "Gerrie" Nel (/ˈxɛriː ˈnɛl/, born 1961) is a South African advocate. Until January 2017, he was a prosecutor for the National Prosecuting Authority (NPA) of South Africa. He is nicknamed "Bulldog" for his tenacity in the courtroom, and is regularly assigned to difficult and high-profile cases.

== Education and legal career ==
Nel matriculated from Hoërskool Piet Potgieter in Potgietersrus in the Limpopo province in 1979, and studied law in Pretoria.

Nel started working as a prosecutor in 1984. He was a junior prosecutor in the trial of Clive Derby-Lewis and Janusz Waluś, who were both convicted in connection with the assassination of anti-apartheid activist Chris Hani in 1993. He was the Gauteng Regional Head of the NPA's Directorate of Special Operations (Scorpions) business unit from its inception in 1999 until it was disbanded in 2009.

Nel led the prosecution in the trial of former national police commissioner and Interpol president Jackie Selebi, who was convicted of corruption in 2010. In 2012 he received two awards in recognition of his work on the Selebi case. He was named Prosecutor of the Year by the local Society of State Advocates and received a Special Achievement Award from the International Association of Prosecutors for "fierce pursuit of the vision of the National Prosecuting Authority's ideals to achieve justice in society".

Nel was the lead prosecutor in the 2014 trial of Oscar Pistorius for the murder of Reeva Steenkamp and several gun-related charges.

In January 2017, he resigned from his position as a prosecutor at the NPA, joining AfriForum with the aim of setting up a private prosecutions unit, which AfriForum said would operate in the interests of all South Africans.

== Wrestling ==
Nel once competed in wrestling at a provincial level. He teaches children wrestling in the evenings.

== Awards ==
- 2012 – Society of State Advocates Ukugqwesa Prosecutor of the Year Award
- 2012 – International Association of Prosecutors Special Achievement Award
