= Mineseeker Foundation =

South African organisation dedicated to removing land mines

Mineseeker Foundation is a South African organisation dedicated to the detection, identification and removal of land mines, especially in African countries. It also provides help for people who have been affected by land mines, assisting in rehabilitation of the land and ensuring that affected communities have productive and sustainable futures. The organisation estimates that there are over 100 million land mines still buried, and that someone steps on a land mine every 19 minutes.

Mineseeker Foundation uses technology developed by the British Ministry of Defence and licensed to the organisation to detect and remove mines. Its effectiveness in Kosovo was featured in the BBC documentary Mineseekers.

The Mineseeker Foundation also operates an initiative called The Sole of Africa, which provides assistance to communities affected by land mines. Once land mines are detected and removed, the land is returned to agricultural uses. The foundation is supported by a number of notable patrons and ambassadors including Nelson Mandela, Oscar Pistorius and Brad Pitt.
