= Murder of Anene Booysen =

Rape and murder of teenage girl in South Africa

- Location: Bredasdorp, Western Cape, South Africa
- Date: February 2, 2013
- Attack type: Sexual violence: Gang-rape and murder
- Deaths: 1
- No. of participants: 5-6 male attackers (alleged)
- Verdict: Guilty
- Convicted: 1

Anene Booysen (October 30, 1995 – February 2, 2013) was a 17-year-old girl who was found by a security guard the morning after she had been gang-raped and disemboweled at a construction site in Bredasdorp, in the Western Cape, South Africa on February 2, 2013; she was still alive, but died later in the day.

== Rape and murder ==
Anene Booysen was found by a security guard lying a short distance from her house after spending time at a bar on the evening of February 2, 2013. She died from her injuries in hospital six hours later. She had managed to allegedly identify her attackers before her death. It is unknown why the police chose to ignore all but one.

== Reaction ==
South Africa's President Jacob Zuma condemned the attack as "shocking, cruel and most inhumane". The Congress of South African Trade Unions (Cosatu), South Africa's biggest labour union, called for mass action over rape in South Africa. Opposition parliamentary leader Lindiwe Mazibuko called for parliamentary hearings. The United Nations in South Africa issued a statement strongly condemning the rape and murder. On 13 February, a protest, led by Annie Lennox, was staged at St. George's Cathedral, Cape Town.

Booysen and Reeva Steenkamp, both young South African women killed in 2013, were named SA Persons of the year 2013 by the Daily Maverick.

== Funeral ==
A funeral was held at the Dutch Reformed Church in Bredasdorp, about 128 km (80 mi) east of Cape Town on February 9, 2013.

== Prosecution ==
Johannes Kana was convicted for the crime, and sentenced to two consecutive life sentences. Two suspects were initially arrested, but only Kana, who confessed to raping Booysen, stood trial. Before she died, Booysen told police five or six men were involved in the attack.
