= Reeva Steenkamp =

South African model and murder victim (1983–2013)

- Steenkamp in an undated photo released by Capacity Relations in February 2013
- Born: Reeva Rebecca Steenkamp; 19 August 1983; Cape Town, Cape Province, Republic of South Africa
- Died: 14 February 2013 (aged 29); Pretoria, Gauteng, South Africa
- Cause of death: Murder (gunshot wounds)
- Education: Nelson Mandela Metropolitan University (2005)
- Occupations: Model; paralegal
- Years active: 1997–2013
- Partner: Oscar Pistorius (2012–2013)
- Parent(s): Barry and June Steenkamp
- Modeling information
- Height: 1.71 m (5 ft 7 1/2 in)
- Hair color: Blonde
- Eye color: Blue/green
- Agency: Ice Model Management; Publicist: Sarit Tomlinson (Capacity Relations)

Reeva Rebecca Steenkamp (local English: /ˈriːvə ˈstɪərnkʌmp/ REE-və STEERN-kump, Afrikaans: [ˈriəfa ˈstiəŋkamp]; 19 August 1983 – 14 February 2013) was a South African model and paralegal. She modelled for FHM magazine and was the first face of Avon cosmetics in South Africa. Steenkamp once worked as the live roaming presenter for FashionTV in South Africa and starred in television advertisements for Toyota Land Cruiser, Clover Industries, Redds and Aldor Pin Pop. She was a celebrity contestant on the BBC Lifestyle show Baking Made Easy in 2012 and on Tropika Island of Treasure season 5 which aired on SABC 3 in February 2013.

On Valentine's Day 2013, Steenkamp was shot dead by her boyfriend, Oscar Pistorius, at his home in Pretoria. He stated that he thought Steenkamp was an intruder hiding in the bathroom. Pistorius was found guilty of culpable homicide at a first trial, and was sentenced to five years in prison. On 3 December 2015, the Supreme Court of Appeal of South Africa overturned this conviction and instead convicted Pistorius of murder. He was sentenced to six years in prison, which was later increased to 13 years and 5 months by the Court of Appeal. Pistorius was released on parole on 5 January 2024 after serving a total of 8.5 years in prison, in addition to seven months of house arrest.

== Early life ==
Steenkamp was born in Cape Town to parents Barry Steenkamp, a horse trainer, and his second wife, June (née Marshall, previously Cowburn), who was born in Blackburn, England. She had two older half-siblings from her father and mother's respective previous marriages, Adam Steenkamp and Simone Cowburn. The family later moved to Port Elizabeth, where she attended St Dominic's Priory School. After school she studied law at the University of Port Elizabeth, which became a part of Nelson Mandela Metropolitan University, where she graduated with a Bachelor of Laws degree in 2005.

== Career ==
After university, Steenkamp worked as a paralegal and as a model. She applied to the bar in late 2011 and hoped to be a qualified legal advocate by the age of 30.

=== Modeling ===
Steenkamp began modelling at the age of 14. She was a finalist in the Weekend Post Faces of the Future competition in 2004 and in the Herald Miss Port Elizabeth contest in 2005. She appeared in FHM magazine as a model and cover girl and was the first face of Avon cosmetics in South Africa. She also modeled for the jewelry company Sivana Diamonds.

She was ranked #40 in the FHM 100 Sexiest Women in the World poll of South African FHM readers in 2011 and #45 in 2012. Her style icon was Marc Jacobs. She was a celebrity face of the Spirit Day anti-bullying campaign in 2012.

=== Television ===
Steenkamp once worked as the live roaming presenter for FashionTV in South Africa. She starred in television advertisements for a range of products, including Toyota Land Cruiser, Clover "The One", Redds and Aldor Pin Pop. She featured as a celebrity contestant on the BBC Lifestyle show Baking Made Easy in 2012.

At the time of her death, Steenkamp was signed up to appear on season five of the reality TV program Tropika Island of Treasure and had filmed the series episodes on location in Jamaica. The screening of the series began airing as scheduled on 16 February 2013, two days after her death. The first episode of the series was dedicated to Steenkamp and was preceded by a video tribute to her.

== Personal life ==
Steenkamp was a keen horse rider until she broke her back in a fall in her early 20s and had to learn to walk again. On the South African celebrity circuit, she was a regular A-list guest at red carpet events and a noted socialite on the Johannesburg party scene.

Steenkamp had been dating Oscar Pistorius, a South African Olympic and Paralympic runner, since November 2012. She had previously dated Springbok rugby player Francois Hougaard.

== Murder and trial ==
On Valentine's Day 2013, Steenkamp's boyfriend Oscar Pistorius fired four shots through the door of a locked bathroom cubicle in his Pretoria home, three of which struck Steenkamp who was on the other side. Immediately following this, Pistorius proceeded to break down the bathroom door with a cricket bat to reach Steenkamp. He attempted to render emergency medical assistance and called for help. One of the first responders to the scene was a neighbor, doctor Johan Stipp, who did a jaw-lift-maneuver on Steenkamp in an attempt to open her airway. In his analysis of the situation he noted that she had no peripheral pulse, showed no sign of breathing-movements, and that her pupils were fixed and dilated. It was apparent that she had been mortally wounded.

Her body was cremated at Victoria Park crematorium in Port Elizabeth on 19 February 2013 and the service was conducted by Pastor Kurt Sutton of the Oasis Family Church in Port Elizabeth. Pistorius was arrested and charged with murder. Pistorius admitted that he shot Steenkamp, but said he believed he was shooting an intruder.

On 12 September 2014, he was found not guilty of murder, but guilty of culpable homicide in the case. On 21 October 2014, he was sentenced to five years in jail, but only served 10 months. In December 2015, the Supreme Court of Appeals overturned the culpable homicide verdict and found Pistorius guilty of murder. On 6 July 2016, Judge Masipa sentenced Pistorius to six years in prison for murder, despite South Africa carrying a minimum sentence of 15 years for this offence.

On 24 November 2017, the Court of Appeal extended Oscar Pistorius's jail term to 13 years and five months with the possibility of parole from 2023.

=== Media-coverage after death ===
Steenkamp and Anene Booysen, both young South African women killed in 2013, were named SA Persons of the year 2013 by the Daily Maverick.

In February 2014, eNCA broadcast a half-hour documentary special about Steenkamp's life titled Reeva: The Model You Thought You Knew.

On 12 September 2014, SABC 3 broadcast an episode of Special Assignment titled Oscar Pistorius: The Verdict.
