= S v Rabie =

South African legal case

S v Rabie is an important case in South African law, heard in the Appellate Division on 12 September 1975, with judgment handed down on 23 September. The presiding officers were Holmes JA, Corbett JA and Kotzé AJA. The case is significant primarily in the area of sentencing, with its determination that the punishment should

- fit the criminal as well as the crime;
- be fair to society; and
- be blended with a measure of mercy according to the circumstances.

The court held that in every appeal against a sentence, whether imposed by a magistrate or a Judge, the Court hearing the appeal

1. should be guided by the principle that punishment is "pre-eminently a matter for the discretion of the trial Court"; and
2. should be careful not to erode such discretion; hence the further principle that the sentence should only be altered if the discretion has not been "judicially and properly exercised."

The test under the second of these points is whether the sentence is vitiated by irregularity or misdirection or is disturbingly inappropriate.

== Facts ==
The appellant had been convicted on nineteen counts of fraud, which had been taken together for the purposes of sentence, the appellant having been sentenced to

- a fine of R5 000; and
- imprisonment for three years, of which two years had been suspended on relevant conditions.

In addition he had been convicted and fined on three counts of overcharging.

In an appeal against the sentence on the nineteen counts of fraud, it was contended that they amounted substantially to the same offence of overcharging in contravention of the Rents Act, for which the appellant had merely been fined on the other three counts on which he had been convicted.

== Judgment ==
The Court, however, found that the fraud was intended to be and was a cover-up for the unlawful overcharging of rents, and held that there was no basis for appellate interference with the trial Judge's sentence. The Appellate Division did not have an overriding discretion to ameliorate the sentences of trial Courts. The discretion was pre-eminently theirs, alterable only on the grounds mentioned above. The appeal was accordingly dismissed.

== See also ==
- Crime in South Africa
- Criminal procedure in South Africa
- Law of South Africa
- South African criminal law
- Sentence (law)
