= SABC Special Assignment =

Special Assignment is an investigative current affairs programme on SABC. Since August 1998 the programme has covered news events in South Africa and beyond, often disclosing criminal activities and atrocities unknown to the public. Ashraf Garda is the show's current host. The show is screened weekly on SABC 3 at 21:30 GMT.
