= Culpable homicide =

Categorisation of crimes in the legal systems of Commonwealth countries

Culpable homicide is a categorisation of certain offences in various jurisdictions within the Commonwealth of Nations which involves the homicide (illegal killing of a person) either with or without an intention to kill, or both, depending upon how a particular jurisdiction has defined the offence.

In India and Singapore, the definition of culpable homicide is roughly equivalent to the common law offences of murder and voluntary manslaughter in other jurisdictions, distinguishing between the two in terms of severity. In Scotland, where the term originates, culpable homicide can be both voluntary and involuntary, whereas in South Africa it can only be the latter.

== Jurisdictions ==
"Culpable homicide" offences are found in the following jurisdictions; the description of the local version of the offence is given where available:

=== Canada ===
In Canada, "culpable homicide" is not itself an offence. Rather, the term is used in the Criminal Code to classify all killings of persons as either culpable or not culpable homicide. There are three types of culpable homicide: murder, manslaughter and infanticide. Killings classified as not culpable are justifiable killings; thus the term is used to define the criminal intent or mens rea of a killing. Non-culpable homicide includes those committed in self-defence.

=== India ===
Culpable homicide in India is defined in the Bharatiya Nyaya Sanhita, 2023, as causing death by doing an act with the intention to kill, or with the knowledge that such an act will likely cause death. It is then divided further into two offences: murder, and culpable homicide not amounting to murder, the latter being the rough equivalent of voluntary manslaughter in other jurisdictions.

The mens rea for murder is present in both offences, but homicide is culpable homicide not amounting to murder generally if any of the circumstances excepted in section 101 are present, or if other mitigating circumstances reduce the individual's culpability. The circumstances mentioned in section 101 are:

1. Grave or sudden provocation
2. Exceeding the right of private defence
3. Public servant exceeding their powers
4. Sudden fight in the heat of passion
5. Consent of a person over 18

In Indian law, causing death by negligence is a separate offence, equivalent to involuntary manslaughter in other jurisdictions.

=== Pakistan ===
The Pakistan Penal Code (PPC) in earlier form included the offence of "culpable homicide" for acts of homicide resulting from the infliction of intentional harm upon a person:

§299 Culpable homicide §301 Culpable homicide by causing death of person other than person whose death was intended

Amendments in recent years have replaced the specific phrase "culpable homicide" within those sections and introduced terms from Sharia law but it remains in §38 (Persons concerned in criminal act may be guilty of different offences).

The current equivalent sections are:

300. Qatl-e-Amd:

Whoever, with the intention of causing death or with the intention of causing bodily injury to a person, by doing an act which in the ordinary course of nature is likely to cause death, or with the knowledge that his act is so imminently dangerous that it must in all probability cause death, causes the death of such person, is said to commit qatl-e-amd.

301. Causing death of person other than the person whose death was intended:

Where a person, by doing anything which he intends or knows to be likely to

cause death, causes death of any person whose death he neither intends nor knows himself to be likely to cause, such an act committed by the offender shall be liable for qatl-i-amd.

Following sections of the PPC deal further with the offence in increased detail.

=== Scotland ===
Culpable homicide is committed where the accused has caused loss of life through wrongful conduct but where there was no intention to kill or "wicked recklessness". It is an offence under common law and is roughly equivalent to the offence of manslaughter in the law of England and Wales.

While the offence charged remains the same there can be a great variation between individual cases including whether or not the act was voluntary or involuntary:

- Voluntary culpable homicide is homicide where the mens rea for murder is present but mitigating circumstances reduce the crime to culpable homicide.
- Involuntary culpable homicide is homicide where the mens rea for murder is not present but either the independent mens rea for culpable homicide is present, or the circumstances in which death was caused make it culpable homicide. Involuntary culpable homicide may arise in the context of an unlawful act or a lawful act. The mens rea requirement is different in each case.

=== Singapore ===
"Culpable homicide" is: Whoever causes death by doing an act with the intention of causing death, or with the intention of causing such bodily injury as is likely to cause death, or with the knowledge that he is likely by such act to cause death, commits the offence of culpable homicide.

==== Examples ====
- Person A lays sticks and turf over a pit, with the intention of thereby causing death, or with the knowledge that death is likely to be thereby caused. Person Z, believing the ground to be firm, treads on it, falls in and is killed. A has committed the offence of culpable homicide.
- A knows Z to be behind a bush. B does not know it. A, intending to cause, or knowing it to be likely to cause Z’s death, induces B to fire at the bush. B fires and kills Z. Here B may be guilty of no offence; but A has committed the offence of culpable homicide.

=== South Africa ===
"Culpable homicide" has been defined (in South African law) simply as "the unlawful negligent killing of a human being", the rough equivalent of involuntary manslaughter in Anglo-American law.

== See also ==
- Corporate Manslaughter and Corporate Homicide Act 2007
- Criminal Code (Canada)
- Bharatiya Nyaya Sanhita, 2023
- Scottish criminal law
