= 2018 in South Africa =

- Decades: 1990s; 2000s; 2010s; 2020s
- See also: List of years in South Africa

The following lists events that happened during 2018 in South Africa.

== Incumbents ==
=== National Government ===
- President of South Africa
  - Jacob Zuma (ANC) – until 14 February
  - Cyril Ramaphosa (ANC) – from 15 February
- Acting President: Cyril Ramaphosa (ANC) – 14–15 February
- Deputy President
  - Cyril Ramaphosa (ANC) – until 15 February
  - David Mabuza (ANC) – since February
- Leader of the Opposition: Mmusi Maimane (DA)
- Chief Justice: Mogoeng Mogoeng
- Deputy Chief Justice: Raymond Zondo
- President of the Supreme Court of Appeal: Mandisa Maya
- Deputy President of the Supreme Court of Appeal: Vacant
- Chairperson of the Electoral Court of South Africa: Khayelihle Kenneth Mthiyane
- Speaker of the National Assembly: Baleka Mbete (ANC)
- Chairperson of the National Council of Provinces: Thandi Modise (ANC)

==== Cabinet ====
The Cabinet, together with the President and the Deputy President, forms part of the Executive.

=== Provincial Premiers ===
- Eastern Cape Province: Phumulo Masualle (ANC)
- Free State Province: Ace Magashule (ANC)
- Gauteng Province: David Makhura (ANC)
- KwaZulu-Natal Province: Willies Mchunu (ANC)
- Limpopo Province: Stanley Mathabatha (ANC)
- Mpumalanga Province: David Mabuza (ANC)
- North West Province: Supra Mahumapelo (ANC)
- Northern Cape Province: Sylvia Lucas (ANC)
- Western Cape Province: Helen Zille (DA)

== Predicted and scheduled events ==
Events that are scheduled to occur in 2018 in South Africa.

=== February ===
- 8 February – The President of South Africa is set to deliver the State of the Nation address to a joint sitting of the National Assembly and the National Council of Provinces, at 19:00. (A new date will be announced, after the Speaker of the National Assembly announced that the address are postponed.)
- 21 February – The Minister of Finance, Malusi Gigaba, is set to deliver the Budget Speech.

== Events ==
The following lists events that happened during 2018 in South Africa.

=== January ===
- 5 January – The first Test match in the series between South Africa and India takes place in Cape Town (Newlands Cricket Ground). South Africa win the match within four days, by 72 runs.
- 9 January – President Jacob Zuma announces a commission of inquiry into allegations of State capture. He selects Deputy Chief Justice Raymond Zondo to head the commission.
- 13 January – The new President of the African National Congress, Cyril Ramaphosa delivered the ANC "January 8 statement" in East London, Eastern Cape.
- 13 January – The second Test match in the series between South Africa and India takes place in Centurion (SuperSport Park). South Africa win the match 135 runs.
- 24 January – The third Test match in the series between South Africa and India takes place in Johannesburg (Wanderers Cricket Ground). India win the match by 63 runs. South Africa win the Test series 2–1.

=== February ===
- 1 February – The first ODI match in the series between South Africa and India takes place in Durban (Kingsmead Cricket Ground). India win the match by 6 wickets.
- 4 February – The second ODI match in the series between South Africa and India takes place in Centurion (SuperSport Park). India win the match by 9 wickets. South Africa's score of 118/10 becomes South Africa's lowest score in South Africa by South Africa.
- 6 February – The Speaker of the National Assembly announces that the State of the Nation address is postponed to a later date.
- 13 February – The Secretary-General of the ANC, Ace Magashule, officially announces that the National Executive Committee of the ANC has officially recalled Jacob Zuma as President of South Africa. He is given until the end of the day to step down as president.
- 14 February – Jacob Zuma announces his resignation as President of South Africa, after a speech of about 25 minutes, just before 23:00. In resigning his position, he effectively evaded a vote of no confidence that was to be supported by his own party. According to Section 90(1) of the Constitution of South Africa, Deputy President Cyril Ramaphosa became Acting President of South Africa.
- 15 February – Cyril Ramaphosa is sworn in as President of South Africa.
- 16 February – President Cyril Ramaphosa delivers his first State of the Nation Address.

=== April ===
- 4 – 15 April South Africa competes in the 2018 Commonwealth Games in Gold Coast, Queensland, Australia.

=== May ===
- 2 – Sandile Mantsoe is found guilty at the High Court in Johannesburg of murdering his 22-year-old ex-girlfriend Karabo Mokoena, whose stabbed and burnt remains were found buried in a shallow grave in a field in Johannesburg. The case has caused shock and outrage, with the victim becoming symbolic of the violence faced by women in South Africa.
- 23 May – South African cricketer, AB de Villiers who is recognised as one of the greatest batsmen in modern-day cricket suddenly announced his retirement from international cricket at the age of 34.

=== July ===
- 20 July – Inkatha Freedom Party (IFP) stated that the time had come to discuss the possibility of reinstating the death penalty in South Africa.

=== August ===
- 8 August – The National Freedom Party calls for bringing back the death penalty in South Africa after the death of Khensani Maseko, in a similar call to one made by the IFP weeks ago.
- 20 August
  - Hearings at the Zondo Commission of Inquiry into State Capture start

=== November ===
- 12 November — Three men - Vernon Witbooi, Geraldo Parsons and Eben van Niekerk - are convicted at the Western Cape High Court of kidnapping, raping and brutally killing Stellenbosch University student Hannah Cornelius, whose body was found outside Stellenbosch. They are also convicted of the attempted murder of a friend of Hannah's who was abducted at the same time and left for dead near Kraaifontein. The three men receive life sentences.

== Deaths ==
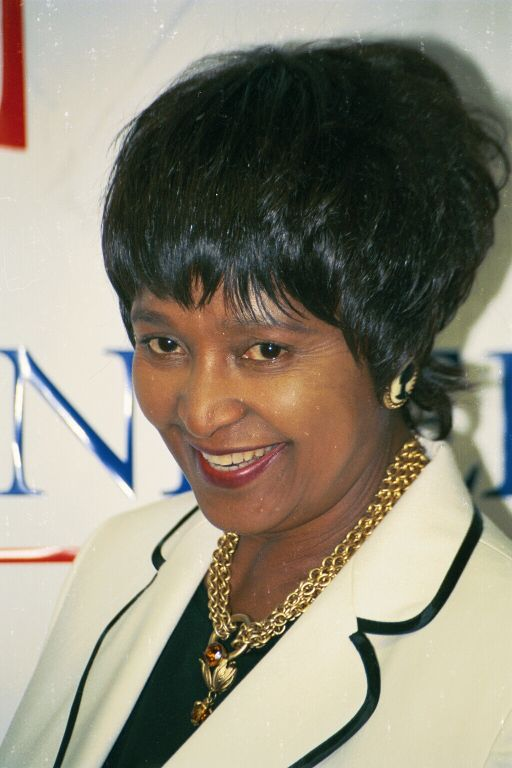
Winnie Madikizela-Mandela

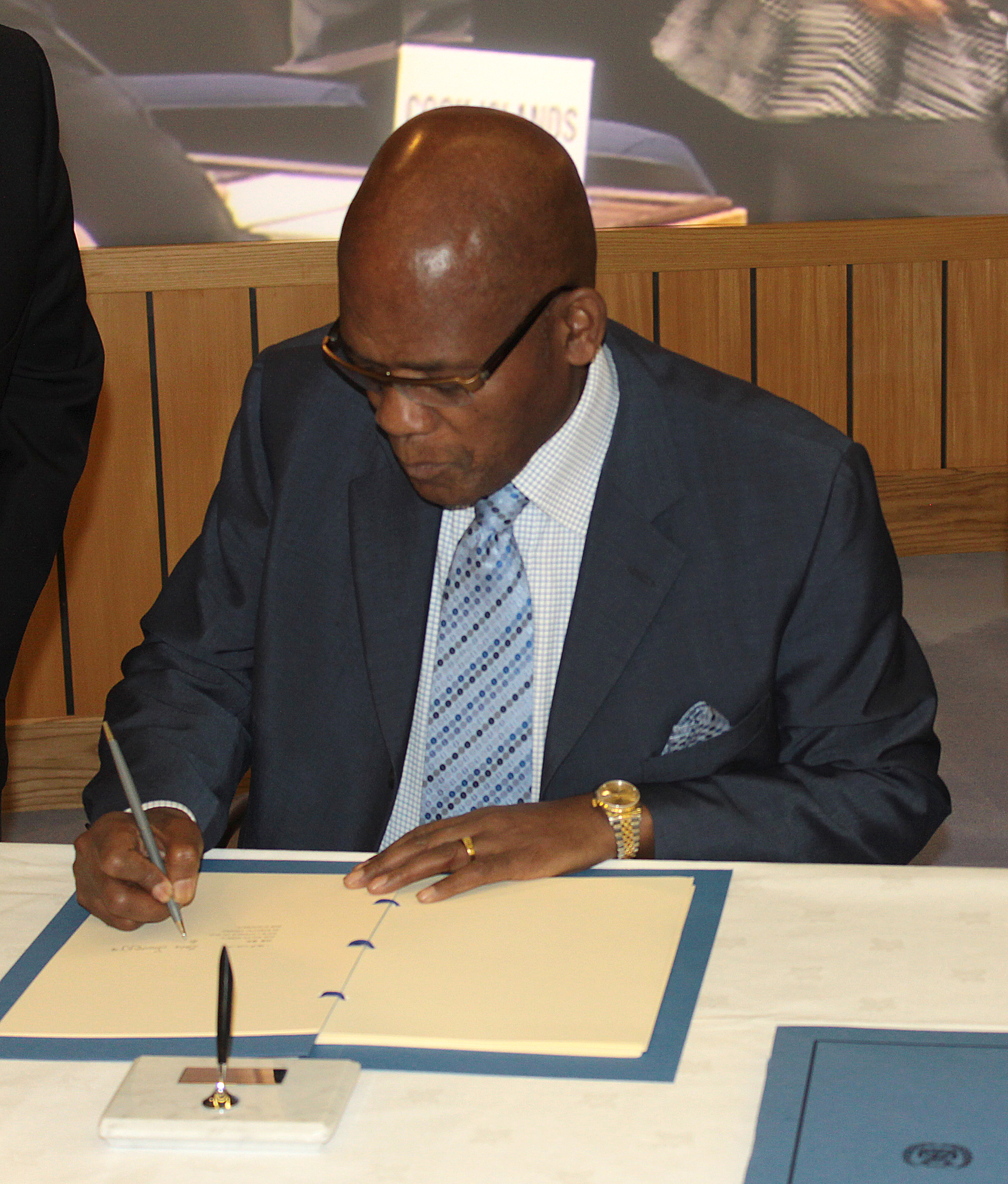
Zola Skweyiya

=== January ===
- 3 January
  - Mlungisi Bali, 27, Rugby union player (Griffons, Border Bulldogs), stabbing.
  - Keorapetse Kgositsile, 79, Poet and journalist.
  - Lara Kruger, 30, Disc jockey (Motsweding FM) and transgender rights activist.
- 9 January
  - Gerald Morkel, 76, politician, Premier of the Western Cape (1998–2001), Mayor of Cape Town (2001–2002).
- 13 January
  - John Desmond "Jack" Nel, 89, Cricketer.
- 18 January
  - Lucas Mangope, 94, politician, President of Bophuthatswana (1977–1994).
- 19 January
  - Dik Abed, 73, South African-born Dutch cricketer.
- 20 January
  - Harry Selby, 92, Hunter and Safari guide.
- 21 January
  - David Pithey, 81, Cricketer.
- 23 January
  - Hugh Masekela, 78, Jazz trumpeter ("Grazing in the Grass", "Bring Him Back Home") and composer ("Soweto Blues").
- 25 January
  - Sandy Mokwena, 68, Actor ("Yizo Yizo" and e.tv's "Scandal!").
- 29 January
  - Clive van Ryneveld, 89, Cricketer (National team, 1951–1958), rugby union player (England national rugby union team) and politician (United Party and Progressive Party).
- 31 January
  - David Phetoe, 85, Actor ("Generations", "Sgudi Snyasi" and "Cry, The Beloved Country").

=== February ===
- 1 February
  - John Jacob Lavranos, 91, Insurance broker and botanist.
- 12 February
  - Mogau Tshehla, 26, Footballer.
- 17 February
  - Sampie Terreblanche, 84, Economist and writer.

=== March ===
- 8 March
  - Peter Temple, 71, South African-born Australian writer (The Broken Shore, Truth, White Dog), Miles Franklin Award winner (2010), Gold Dagger (2006).
- 13 March
  - Matthew Lester, educator, tax expert and financial columnist (The Sunday Times).
- 19 March
  - Madge Bester, 54, disability rights activist, once world's shortest woman.

=== April ===
- 2 April
  - Winnie Madikizela-Mandela, 81, Anti-apartheid activist and politician, MP (since 2009).
- 3 April
  - Pam Golding, 90, Real estate developer, founder of Pam Golding Properties.
- 11 April
  - Zola Skweyiya, 75, Politician.
- 28 April
  - Akhumzi Jezile, 29, actor & television personality, car crash.

=== June ===
- 20 June
  - Billy Modise, 87, South African former ambassador.

=== August ===
- 13 August
  - Mark Minnie, 37, former narcotics branch policeman and co-author of The Lost Boys of Bird Island, dies from apparent suicide
- 15 August
  - Veronica Sobukwe, 91, nurse, political activist and wife to Robert Sobukwe

== Public holidays in South Africa, 2018 ==
- 1 January – Monday, New Year's Day
- 21 March – Wednesday, Human Rights Day
- 30 March – Friday, Good Friday
- 2 April – Monday, Family Day (Easter Monday)
- 27 April – Friday, Freedom Day
- 1 May – Tuesday, Labour Day
- 16 June – Saturday, Youth Day
- 9 August – Thursday, National Women's Day
- 24 September – Monday, Heritage Day
- 16 December – Sunday, Day of Reconciliation
- 17 December – Monday, Public holiday
- 25 December – Tuesday, Christmas Day
- 26 December – Wednesday, Day of Good Will
