= Open forum =

Open forum or Open Forum may refer to:

- a public forum in United States constitutional law
- Open Forum (Australia), a public policy blogging website
- OpenForum, a 2012 conference in Cape Town, South Africa

== See also ==
- Open Forum for CSO Development Effectiveness
- Open Forum Davos, a fringe event at the World Economic Forum
- Open Forum Infectious Diseases, an academic journal
- Open Forum of Cambodia, a former not-for-profit organisation
