= 2010 in South Africa =

- Decades: 1990s; 2000s; 2010s; 2020s
- See also: List of years in South Africa

The following lists events that happened during 2010 in South Africa.

== Incumbents ==
- President: Jacob Zuma.
- Deputy President: Kgalema Motlanthe.
- Chief Justice: Sandile Ngcobo.

=== Cabinet ===
The Cabinet, together with the President and the Deputy President, forms part of the Executive.

=== Provincial Premiers ===
- Eastern Cape Province: Noxolo Kiviet
- Free State Province: Ace Magashule
- Gauteng Province: Nomvula Mokonyane
- KwaZulu-Natal Province: Zweli Mkhize
- Limpopo Province: Cassel Mathale
- Mpumalanga Province: David Mabuza
- North West Province: Maureen Modiselle (until 19 November), Thandi Modise (since 19 November)
- Northern Cape Province: Hazel Jenkins
- Western Cape Province: Helen Zille

== Events ==
=== February ===
- 24 – Advocate Cézanne Visser is sentenced to seven years in prison by the North Gauteng High Court.
- 24 – Nersa grants Eskom a 24.8% fee increase, 25.8% in 2011 and 25.9% in 2012.
- 25 – The North Gauteng High Court rules that farmers whose land was seized in Zimbabwe can be compensated with Zimbabwean assets in South Africa.

=== March ===
- 2 – Minister of Arts and Culture Lulama Xingwana leaves an art exhibition, allegedly because it depicts same-sex couples.

=== May ===
- 1 – King Shaka International Airport in Durban is opened and replaces Durban International Airport.

=== June ===
- 11 to 11 July – The 2010 FIFA World Cup takes place in South Africa and is won by Spain, with the Netherlands as the runner-up.

=== July ===
- 2 – Former Chief of Police and Chief of Interpol, Jackie Selebi, is found guilty of corruption, but not guilty on further charges of perverting the course of justice.

=== August ===
- 25 – In the Blackheath train accident a minibus carrying 14 school children is struck by a train at a level crossing in Cape Town. Nine die on the scene and a 10th child later dies in hospital.
- 24-26 – President Jacob Zuma leads a delegation of over 200 South African business leaders and entrepreneurs to the People's Republic of China to promote trade and investment between the two countries.

=== September ===
- 22 – Dawie Groenewald and ten associates are arrested in the country's largest wildlife trafficking operation.

=== November ===
- 7 – "Fake billionaire" Mandla Lamba is revealed by an exposé showing that his claimed life story, academic qualifications, and business dealings all lacked credibility. Other business partners subsequently come forward to accuse him of fraud, lying and misrepresentation.
- 13 – Anni Dewani, while on her honeymoon in South Africa, is kidnapped and then murdered in Gugulethu township near Cape Town.

== Deaths ==
- 27 January – Ruben Kruger, Springbok rugby player. (b. 1970)
- 5 February – Harry Schwarz, lawyer, politician and diplomat. (b. 1924)
- 3 April – Eugène Terre'Blanche, political activist. (b. 1941)
- 5 April – Molefi Sefularo, politician and deputy minister. (b. 1957)
- 15 April – Lucas Malan, Afrikaans poet, author and academic. (b. 1946)
- 4 May – Sheena Duncan, activist and Black Sash leader. (b. 1932)
- 14 May – Frederik van Zyl Slabbert, political analyst, businessman and politician. (b. 1940)
- 22 May – Lwandile Zwelenkosi Matanzima, ruler of Western Thembuland. (b. c. 1970)
- 19 June – Nico Smith, activist and theologian. (b. 1929)
- 18 August – Fiona Coyne, actress, author, playwright and television presenter. (b. 1965)
- 19 August – Joe Matthews, activist and politician. (b. 1929)
- 27 August – Oscar Ntwagae, South African footballer. (b. 1977)
- 10 October – Rex Rabanye, jazz, fusion and soulful pop musician. (b. 1944)

== Railways ==
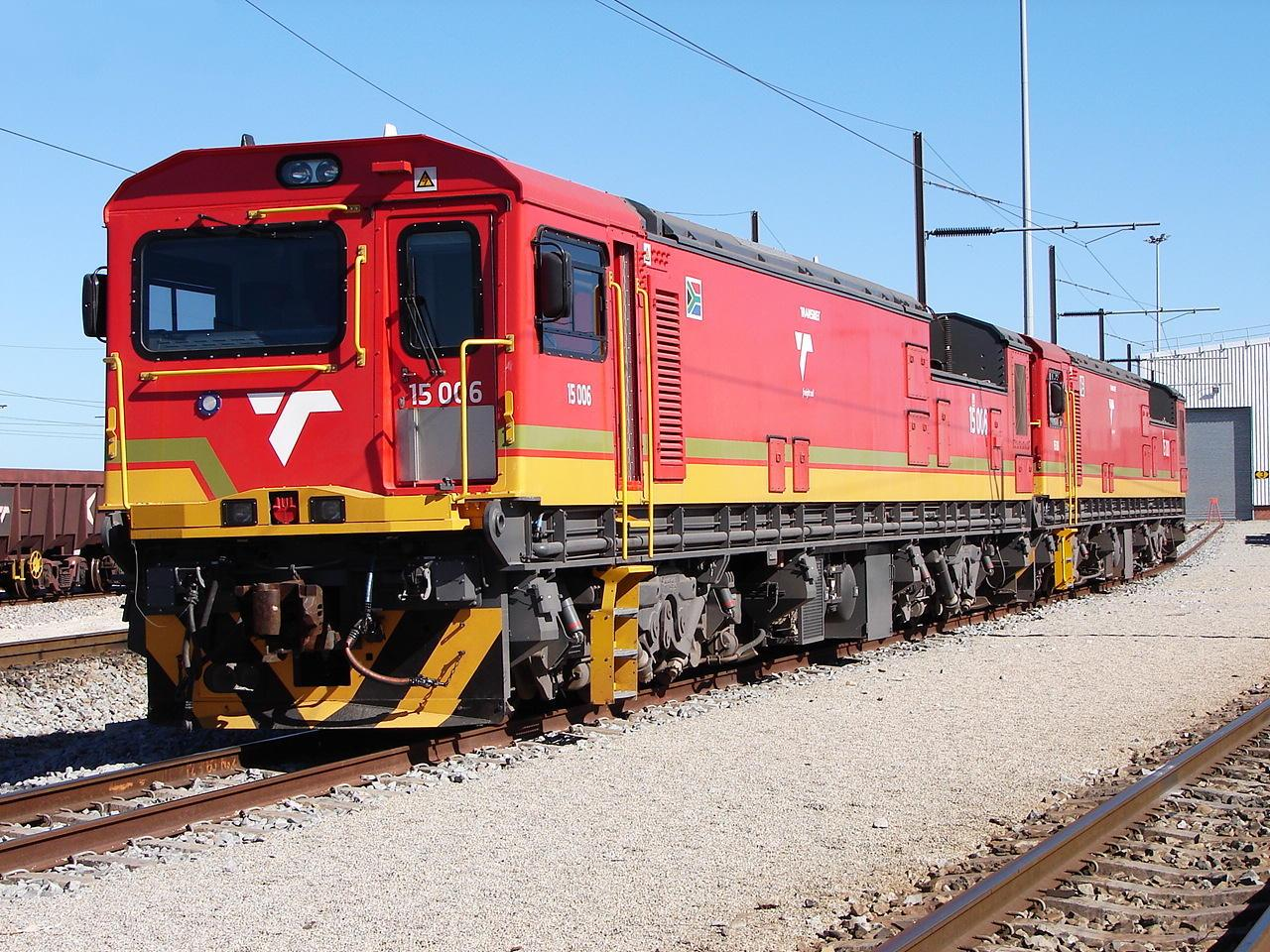
Class 15E

=== Locomotives ===
- Transnet Freight Rail places the first of seventy-six Class 15E heavy electric freight locomotives in service on the Sishen–Saldanha iron ore line.

== Sports ==
=== Rugby ===
- 5 June – South Africa vs Wales International Rugby Friendly is played.

=== Football ===
- 11 June – The 2010 FIFA World Cup begins in South Africa.
- 11 July – The 2010 FIFA World Cup ends.

== See also ==
- 2010 in South African television
