= 2019 in South Africa =

- Decades: 1990s; 2000s; 2010s; 2020s
- See also: List of years in South Africa

Events in the year 2019 in South Africa.

== Incumbents ==
- President: Cyril Ramaphosa (ANC)
- Deputy President: David Mabuza (ANC)
- Chief Justice: Mogoeng Mogoeng
- Deputy Chief Justice: Raymond Zondo
- President of the Supreme Court of Appeal: Mandisa Maya
- Deputy President of the Supreme Court of Appeal: Jeremiah Shongwe (Acting)
- Chairperson of the Electoral Court of South Africa: Khayelihle Kenneth Mthiyane
- Speaker of the National Assembly: Baleka Mbete (ANC)
- Deputy Speaker of the National Assembly: Lechesa Tsenoli (ANC)
- Leader of the Opposition in the National Assembly: Mmusi Maimane (DA)
- Leader of Government Business: David Mabuza (ANC)
- Government Chief Whip (of the National Assembly): Jackson Mthembu (ANC)
- Opposition Chief Whip (of the National Assembly): John Steenhuisen (DA)
- Chairperson of the National Council of Provinces: Thandi Modise (ANC)
- Deputy Chairperson of the National Council of Provinces: Raseriti Tau (ANC)
- Leader of the Opposition of the National Council of Provinces: Cathlene Labuschagne (DA)
- House Chairperson (of the National Council of Provinces): Archibold Nyambi (ANC) and Masefako Dikgale (ANC)
- Chief Whip (of the National Council of Provinces): Seiso Mohai (ANC)

=== Cabinet ===
The Cabinet, together with the President and the Deputy President, forms the Executive.

=== Provincial Premiers ===
- Eastern Cape Province: Phumulo Masualle (ANC)
- Free State Province: Sisi Ntombela (ANC)
- Gauteng Province: David Makhura (ANC)
- KwaZulu-Natal Province: Willies Mchunu (ANC)
- Limpopo Province: Stanley Mathabatha (ANC)
- Mpumalanga Province: Refilwe Mtsweni-Tsipane (ANC)
- North West Province: Job Mokgoro (ANC)
- Northern Cape Province: Sylvia Lucas (ANC)
- Western Cape Province: Helen Zille (DA)

== Events ==
The following lists events that happened during 2019 in South Africa.

=== January ===
- 3 January – The second Test match in the series between South Africa and Pakistan takes place in Cape Town (Newlands Cricket Ground). South Africa win the match within four days, by 9 wickets. South Africa takes a 2–0 lead in the 3-match Test series. (Test no.2340)
- 11 January – The third Test match in the series between South Africa and Pakistan takes place in Johannesburg (Wanderers Cricket Stadium). South Africa win the match within four days, by 107 runs. South Africa win the 3-match Test series, 3–0. (Test no.2341)
- 15 January – The commission of inquiry into allegations of State capture in South Africa (which is led by Deputy Chief Justice Raymond Zondo) resumes after the December break.
- 19 January – The first One-Day International (ODI) match in the series between South Africa and Pakistan takes place in Port Elizabeth (St George's Park Cricket Ground). Pakistan win the match with 5 wickets, with 5 balls remaining. Pakistan takes a 0–1 lead in the 5-match ODI series. (ODI no. 4080)
- 22 January – The second ODI match in the series between South Africa and Pakistan takes place in Durban (Kingsmead Cricket Ground). South Africa win the match by 5 wickets, with 48 balls remaining. South Africa levels the 5-match ODI series, 1–1. (ODI no. 4081)
- 25 January – The third ODI match in the series between South Africa and Pakistan takes place in Centurion (SuperSport Park). South Africa win the match by 13 runs (following the Duckworth-Lewis calculation). South Africa takes the lead in the series, 2–1. (ODI no. 4084)
- 27 January – The fourth ODI match in the series between South Africa and Pakistan takes place in Johannesburg (Wanderers Cricket Stadium). Pakistan win the match by 8 wickets, with 111 balls remaining. Pakistan levels the series, 2–2. (ODI no. 4087)
- 30 January – The fifth ODI match in the series between South Africa and Pakistan takes place in Cape Town (Newlands Cricket Ground). South Africa win the match by 7 wickets, with 60 balls remaining. South Africa win the 5-match ODI series, 3–2 (ODI no. 4090)

=== February ===
- 1 February – The first Twenty20 International (T20I) match in the series between South Africa and Pakistan takes place in Cape Town (Newlands Cricket Ground). South Africa win the match by 6 runs. South Africa takes a 0–1 lead in the 3-match T20I series. (T20I no. 732)
- 3 February – The second T20I match in the series between South Africa and Pakistan takes place in Johannesburg (Wanderers Cricket Stadium). South Africa win the match by 7 runs. South Africa takes a lead in the series, 2–0. (T20I no. 734)
- 6 February – The third T20I match in the series between South Africa and Pakistan takes place in Centurion (SuperSport Park). Pakistan win the match by 27 runs. South Africa win the 3-match T20I series, 2–1 (T20I no. 736)
- 7 February – President Cyril Ramaphosa delivers his second State of the Nation Address (SoNA) to a Joint Sitting of the National Assembly and the National Council of Provinces on at 7 pm (19:00). This is also the final SoNA of the current administration, before the National Elections
- 13 February – The first Test match in the series between South Africa and Sri Lanka takes place in Durban (Kingsmead Cricket Ground). Sri Lanka win the match within four days, by 1 wicket. Sri Lanka takes a 1–0 lead in the 2-match Test series. (Test no. 2347)
- 21 February – The second Test match in the series between South Africa and Sri Lanka takes place in Port Elizabeth (St George's Park Cricket Ground). Sri Lanka win the match within three days, by 8 wickets. Sri Lanka win the 2-match Test series, 2–0. (Test no. 2358)

=== March ===
- 10 March – 2019 Cape Town Cycle Tour: The world's largest organised cycle race with over 35,000 participants is held; Tyler Lange wins the event.
- 14-20 March – Cyclone Idai causes severe flooding in Mozambique and neighbouring countries including South Africa. Over 2.6 million people are affected, with South Africa aiding rescue efforts.
- 25 March – Foreign truck drivers near Durban are attacked by locals opposing their employment; one Zimbabwean driver, Tinei Takawira, is stabbed while police fail to intervene.

=== April ===
- 7 April – A foreign truck driver in Durban is severely injured after a gasoline bomb was thrown at his vehicle.
- 19 April – The Two Oceans Marathon 2019 takes place in Cape Town, drawing over 30,000 participants to what has been described as one of the world's most scenic ultramarathons.
- 24 April – Floods and mudslides in KwaZulu-Natal kill 60 people and leave1,000 homeless, with widespread damage to roads and buildings.

=== May ===
- 11 May – The African National Congress win the elections with 57.5%, its worst result but securing a sixth term.
- 18 May – A Zimbabwean truck driver is assaulted with stones near Mooi River on the N3 Highway, suffering serious facial injuries.
- 25 May – Zeitz MOCAA host the Africa Day celebrations in Cape Town with school choir performances, live music, storytelling, and free admission for children.

=== June ===
- 9 June – Comrades marathon: Edward Mothibi wins the 2019 edition.
- 22 June – About 60 men claiming to be ATDF members block the R544 road near Witbank, forcing foreign truck drivers to abandon their vehicles or unload cargo.
- 27 June – National Arts Festival in Grahamstown: Artists such as Amy Jephta, Kitty Phetla, and Mandla Mlangeni attend. Visual artist Berni Searle is the 2019 Featured Artist.

=== July ===
- 20 July – The Cape Town Festival of Running marks its 21st edition at Sea Point Promenade, featuring relay, marathon, and ultra-distance races.

=== August ===
- 19 August – Cecilia Steyn, Marcel Steyn and Zak Valentine, three members of a religious group called Electus per Deus (Chosen by God), receive multiple life sentences at Gauteng High Court in Johannesburg. Between 2012 and 2016 they killed eleven people in and around Krugersdorp, including Valentine's wife.
- 21 August – South Africa bans its former national flag from 1928 to 1994 for being a symbol of apartheid and white supremacy, and is hate speech if displayed in public.
- 23 August – The Magalies Rocks The Cradle music festival takes place in Magaliesburg, Gauteng.

=== September ===
- 1-11 September – Xenophobic violence in South Africa kills at least 12, displaced thousands, and leads to over 600 arrests. The attacks are condemned, and repatriations organized.
- 2 – 6 – Large protests against gender-based violence and femicide occur after the news of student Uyinene Mrwetyana's death.

=== October ===
- 18-23 October – 2019 African Netball Championships was held in South Africa and hosts South Africa were adjudged the winners of the tournament.
- 29 October – The South African Parliament revives the International Crimes Bill aimed at withdrawing South Africa from the International Criminal Court.

=== November ===
- 2 November – South Africa were crowned world champions defeating England 32–12 in the final of the 2019 Rugby World Cup.

=== December ===
- 8 December - Miss South Africa 2019, Zozibini Tunzi is crowned Miss Universe 2019 at Tyler Perry Studios in Atlanta, Georgia, United States. It was South Africa's third win after the recent victory of Demi-Leigh Nel-Peters in 2017. Tunzi was the first black woman winner since Leila Lopes was crowned in 2011, and South Africa's 1st black winner of an international pageant.

== Deaths ==
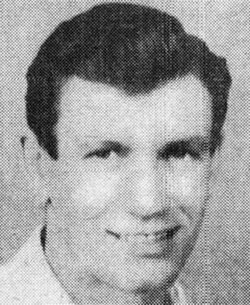
Kelly Seymour

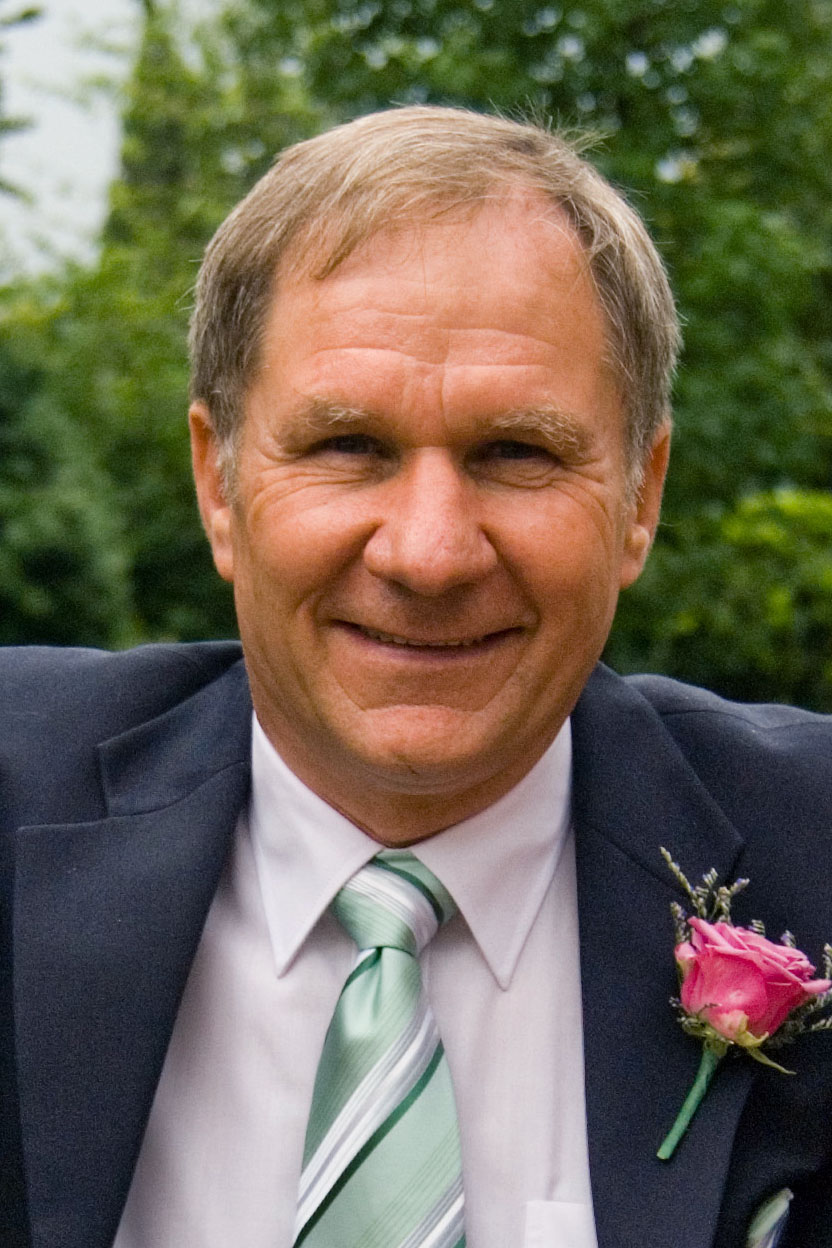
Wim Richter

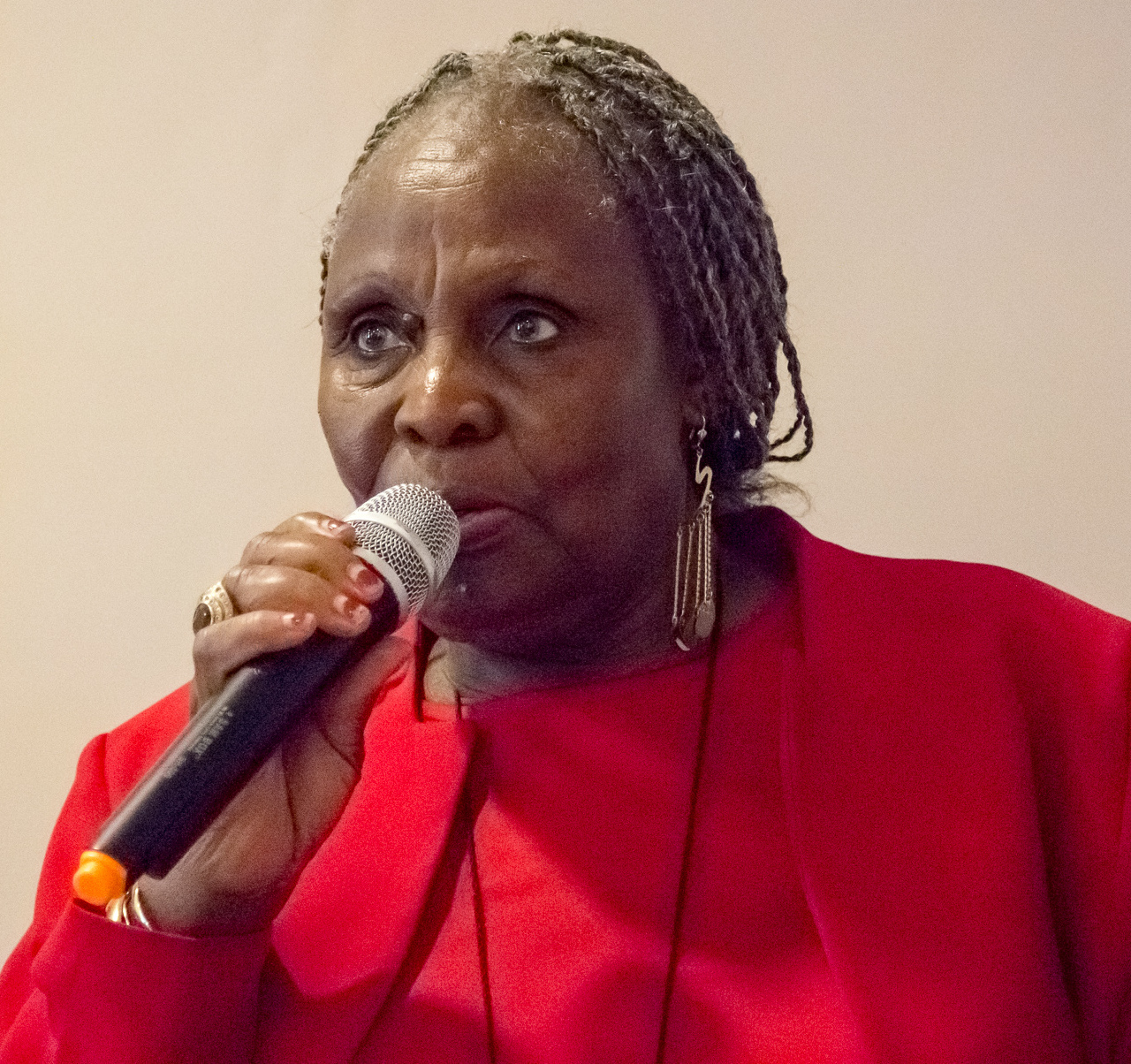
Dorothy Masuka

- 5 January – Dan Tshanda, 54, musician (Splash).
- 6 January – Johan Claassen, rugby union player and coach (national team) (b. 1929).
- 13 January – Phil Masinga, footballer (b. 1969).
- 16 January – Hugh Lewin, anti-apartheid activist and writer (b. 1939).
- 20 January – Dumisani Kumalo, politician and diplomat, UN ambassador (b. 1947).
- 10 February – Terry Dempsey, songwriter (b. 1941).
- 17 February – Kelly Seymour, cricketer (b. 1936).
- 18 February – Wim Richter, chemist (b. 1946).
- 23 February – Dorothy Masuka, jazz singer (b. 1935).
- 24 February – Dame Margaret Scott, ballet dancer (b. 1922).
- 19 March – Arthur Bartman, footballer (b. 1972).
- 12 June – Thandi Brewer, filmmaker.
- 13 July – Isaac Lesiba Maphotho, South African anti-apartheid activist. (b. 1931)
- 15 July – Marc Batchelor, South African footballer (b. 1970)
- 16 July – Johnny Clegg, musician (b. 1953)
- 24 August – Uyinene Mrwetyana, student (b. 2000)
- 13 September – Bavelile Gloria Hlongwa, South African chemical engineer and politician from KwaZulu-Natal and a party member of the African National Congress (ANC) (b. 1981)
- 1 November – Thuliswa Nkabinde-Khawe, politician (b. 1973)
- 14 November – King Zwelonke Sigcawu, South African royal, King of the Xhosa people (since 2006). (b. 1968)
- 9 December – Ben Turok, anti-apartheid activist (b. 1927)
