= 2012 in South Africa =

- Decades: 1990s; 2000s; 2010s; 2020s
- See also: List of years in South Africa

The following lists events that happened during 2012 in South Africa.

== Incumbents ==
- President – Jacob Zuma
- Deputy President – Kgalema Motlanthe
- Chief Justice – Mogoeng Mogoeng

=== Cabinet ===
The Cabinet, together with the President and the Deputy President, forms part of the Executive.

=== Provincial Premiers ===
- Eastern Cape Province: Noxolo Kiviet
- Free State Province: Ace Magashule
- Gauteng Province: Nomvula Mokonyane
- KwaZulu-Natal Province: Zweli Mkhize
- Limpopo Province: Cassel Mathale
- Mpumalanga Province: David Mabuza
- North West Province: Thandi Modise
- Northern Cape Province: Hazel Jenkins
- Western Cape Province: Helen Zille

== Events ==
May

- 22-24 – OpenForum conference is held in Cape Town.

August

- 10 – Marikana miners initiate a Wildcat strike.
- 13 – Striking miners hack to death two security guards and two policemen and remove body parts from the corpses to make muti that would make them "invincible against police bullets".
- 16 – Police open fire on a group of striking Marikana miners, killing 34 and injuring approximately 78.

September

- 18 – Eight South African citizens are killed in Kabul, Afghanistan, when a suicide bomber blows herself up.

October

- 1 – The South African Government commissions an inquiry into the shooting at Marikana.
- 18 – A South African Defence Force soldier attached to the African Union/United Nations peacekeeping forces in Sudan is killed and 3 others injured in an ambush in Northern Darfur.
- 22 – A prison van returning dozens of prisoners to Johannesburg Central prison from court in Randburg is hit by a bomb explosion. At least three are killed, and others wounded; two prisoners escape the van but are re-arrested.

November

- 11 – A runaway fire destroys 76 houses in St Francis Bay.

== Deaths ==
- 21 January – Jeffrey Ntuka, South African footballer . (b. 1985)
- 2 March – Lawrence Anthony, author. (b. 1950)
- 30 April – Sicelo Shiceka, South African politician (b. 1966)
- 5 May – Roy Padayachie, Minister of Public Service and Administration of the Republic of South Africa. (b. 1950)
- 15 May – John Murray, 11th Duke of Atholl, surveyor (b. 1929)
- 27 August – Dr. Neville Alexander, linguist, academic and anti-apartheid campaigner (b. 1936)
- 21 October – Alfred Kumalo, photographer. (b. 1930)

== See also ==
- 2012 in South African television
