= 2015 in South Africa =

- Decades: 1990s; 2000s; 2010s; 2020s
- See also: List of years in South Africa

2015 in South Africa saw a number of social and political protests and movements form. At President Jacob Zuma's 2015 State of the Nation Address, the president was interrupted by an opposition party, the Economic Freedom Fighters, who demanded that he pay back the money used on his Nkandla homestead. South Africa also saw new xenophobic uprisings taking place, mainly targeted towards Africans from other countries. Foreigners were beaten, robbed and murdered during the attacks. The social protest Rhodes Must Fall started in 2015 at the University of Cape Town to protest for the removal of statues erected in South Africa during the colonial era depicting some of the well known colonists who settled in South Africa. In education, South Africa recorded a drop in its matric pass rate from 2013 to 2014. The protest #FeesMustFall was started towards the end of the year and achieved its primary goal of stopping an increase in university fees for 2016. South Africa also saw the discovery of Homo naledi in 2015. The South African national rugby union team came third in the 2015 Rugby World Cup and Trevor Noah started hosting The Daily Show on Comedy Central.

== Incumbents ==
- President – Jacob Zuma
- Deputy President – Cyril Ramaphosa
- Chief Justice – Mogoeng Mogoeng

=== Cabinet ===
The Cabinet, together with the President and the Deputy President, forms part of the Executive.

=== Provincial Premiers ===
- Eastern Cape Province: Phumulo Masualle
- Free State Province: Ace Magashule
- Gauteng Province: David Makhura
- KwaZulu-Natal Province: Senzo Mchunu
- Limpopo Province: Stanley Mathabatha
- Mpumalanga Province: David Mabuza
- North West Province: Supra Mahumapelo
- Northern Cape Province: Sylvia Lucas
- Western Cape Province: Helen Zille

== Events ==
=== January ===
- 5 – Basic Education Minister Angie Motshekga announces that the 2014 matric pass rate has dropped to 75.8% after reaching a record high of 78.2% in 2013.
- 19 – The Constitutional Court rules that a bulk SMS sent out by the Opposition Democratic Alliance before the 2014 general election, alleging that President Jacob Zuma "stole" R246 million of taxpayers' money to fund controversial upgrades to his private Nkandla homestead, was fair comment.
- 21 –The shooting of a 14-year-old boy by a foreign national in Soweto spurs widespread unrest and looting of foreign-owned shops in the area, leading to a resurgence of xenophobic violence in the country.
- 30 – Eugene de Kock, Commander of the South African Police counterinsurgency headquarters under the apartheid government, who was sentenced in 1996 to life imprisonment for crimes that included kidnapping and murder, is granted parole.

=== February ===
- 12 – President Jacob Zuma delivers his eighth State of the Nation Address amid several controversies, including the forced removal of Economic Freedom Fighters MPs by alleged Public Order Police, the jamming of cellphone signals, and the arrest of Democratic Alliance members protesting outside the Houses of Parliament.
- 23 – Leaked documents derived from communications between South Africa's State Security Agency and various agencies are published by Al Jazeera and The Guardian.

=== March ===
- 1 – Multiple fires break out on the Cape Peninsula, damaging large expanses of vegetation and several houses.

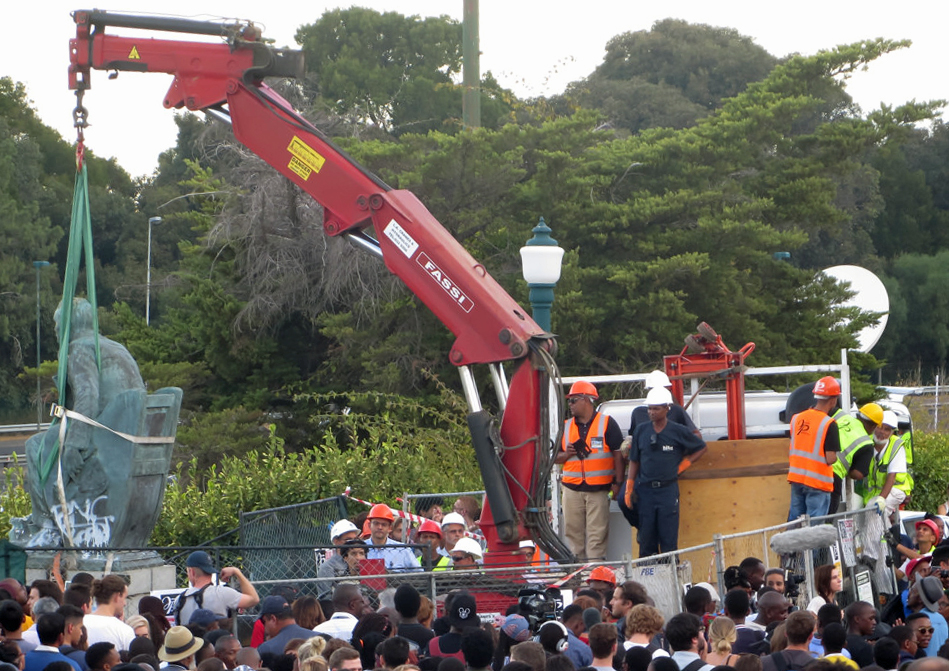
The statue of Cecil John Rhodes in front of the University of Cape Town being removed on 9 April 2015.

- 17 – A group of University of Cape Town students demand the removal of a statue in honour of British imperialist Cecil John Rhodes on campus, claiming that the statue is offensive to black students. These protests spur calls for further "transformation" of South African universities, including a proposed name change for Rhodes University in Grahamstown.
- 24 – The country sees another resurgence of xenophobic violence after a statement by Zulu King Goodwill Zwelithini calling for foreigners residing in South Africa to "pack their belongings and go". Zwelithini later retracts his statements, saying that his comments were misunderstood, and calls for a halt to the violence.

=== April ===
- 30 – Robin Stransham-Ford, a terminally-ill cancer sufferer, is granted the right to die by the North Gauteng High Court in the first assisted suicide case in South Africa.

=== May ===
- 12 – Mmusi Maimane succeeds Helen Zille as the Leader of the Democratic Alliance.
- 28 – South African Football Association president Danny Jordaan is elected mayor of the Nelson Mandela Bay Municipality.

=== June ===
- 1 – Trinidadian football executive and former Deputy President of FIFA, Jack Warner, is accused of accepting a $10 million bribe given to FIFA by the South African Football Association to secure the right for the country to host the 2010 FIFA World Cup.
- 15 – While attending an African Union meeting in South Africa, Sudanese president Omar al-Bashir is prohibited from leaving the country while a court decides whether he should be handed over to the International Criminal Court for war crimes. Bashir is, however, allowed to leave South Africa soon afterward.
- 26 – The Commission of Inquiry's report regarding the killing of 41 mineworkers by South African Police at Marikana is released by President Jacob Zuma, exonerating several political figures formerly accused of playing a role in the massacre, including Deputy President Cyril Ramaphosa, but calling into question Police Commissioner Riah Phiyega's fitness to hold office.

=== July ===
- 6 – It is reported that a fleet of 13 trains purchased by the Passenger Rail Agency of South Africa (Prasa) at a cost of R600-million could pose a "significant safety hazard" to South African commuters as they are allegedly too high for local rail lines. The ensuing controversy results in an inquiry into the academic qualifications of one of Prasa's senior engineers, as well as the dismissal of the company's chief executive, Lucky Montana.
- 17 – More than 100 people are injured after two trains collide near the Booysens Train Station in Johannesburg.

=== August ===
- 25 – Eight former police officers are convicted for the murder of Mozambican immigrant and taxi driver, Mido Macia, in the North Gauteng High Court.

=== September ===
- 10 – An extinct species of hominin dubbed Homo naledi, fossils of which were discovered in 2013 in the Rising Star cave system in Gauteng, is unveiled at Maropeng in the Cradle of Humankind.
- 19 – The South African national rugby team suffers a historic 32-34 loss to Japan at the 2015 Rugby World Cup, in what has been called the "greatest upset in World Cup history". The Springboks later go on to beat Argentina and achieve an overall third place in the World Cup.
- 28
  - South African comedian Trevor Noah succeeds Jon Stewart as host of the American news satire television program, The Daily Show.
  - It is revealed by the US Securities and Exchange Commission (SEC) that the African National Congress front company, Chancellor House, was irregularly paid over $5 million in connection with contracts for the construction of the Medupi and Kusile power stations.
- 29 – The 2015 crime statistics, presented in Parliament by police commissioner Riah Phiyega and minister Nathi Nhleko, indicate an increase in the rate of murder and violent crime in the country.

=== October ===
- 14
  - National Police Commissioner, Riah Phiyega is suspended after an inquiry into her fitness to hold office.
  - A temporary bridge collapses over the M1 motorway in Johannesburg near Sandton, killing two people and injuring twenty.
  - Student protests erupt at the University of Witwatersrand after it is announced that university fees would be raised by 10.5%. Similar protests later spread to universities across the country, including the University of Cape Town and Rhodes University.
- 21 – The #FeesMustFall protests gain momentum countrywide, culminating in a march of 5000 students to the South African Parliament. Riot police move to forcefully disperse the largely peaceful protests using stun grenades, tasers, coloured gas, riot shields and truncheons. Two days later, President Jacob Zuma announces that university fees will not increase in 2016; despite this, protests regarding the lack of transformation at tertiary institutions continue across the country.

=== November ===
- 15–ongoing – Severe drought caused by the El Nino climatological phenomenon, hits five of South Africa's nine provinces, placing strain on the country's water supply and affecting around 2.7 million households.

=== December ===
- 3 – Paralympian Oscar Pistorius, who had already served approximately one-sixth of his prison term for killing his girlfriend Reeva Steenkamp in February 2013, is found guilty of her murder after the Supreme Court of Appeal of South Africa overturned his prior culpable homicide conviction.

== Deaths ==
=== January ===
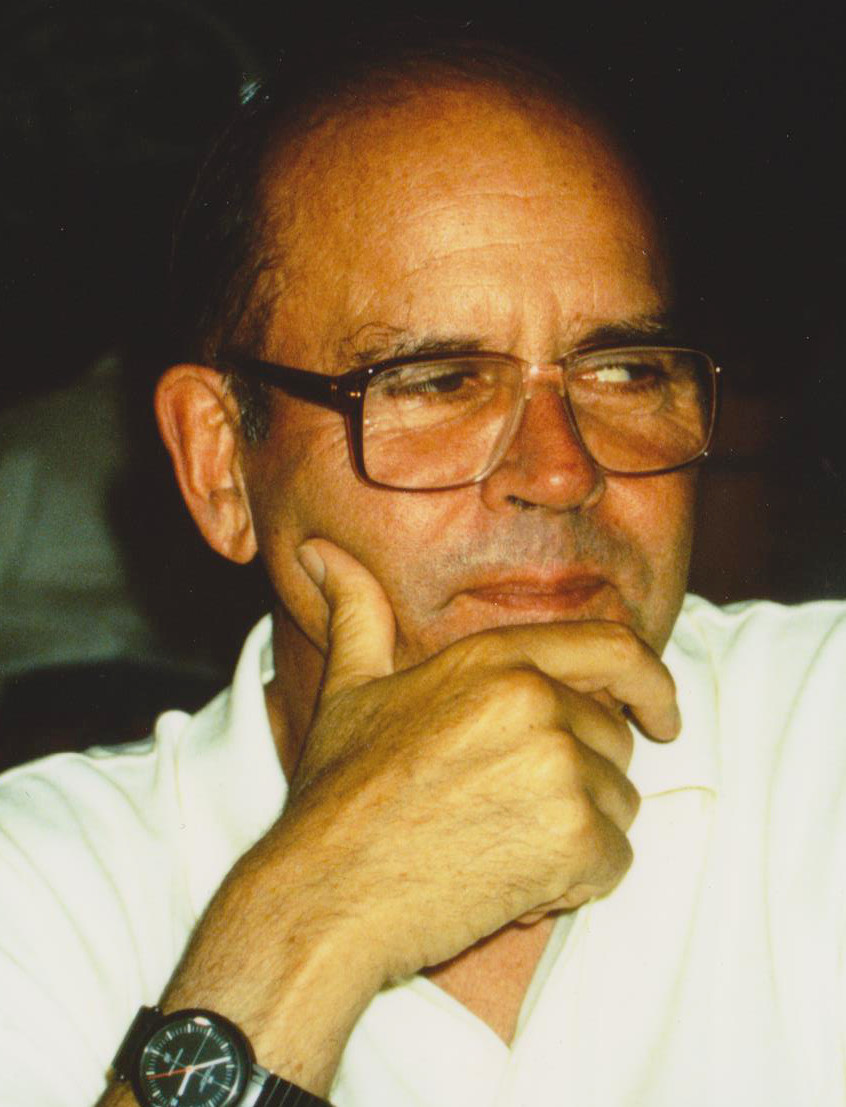
Johannes de Villiers Graaff

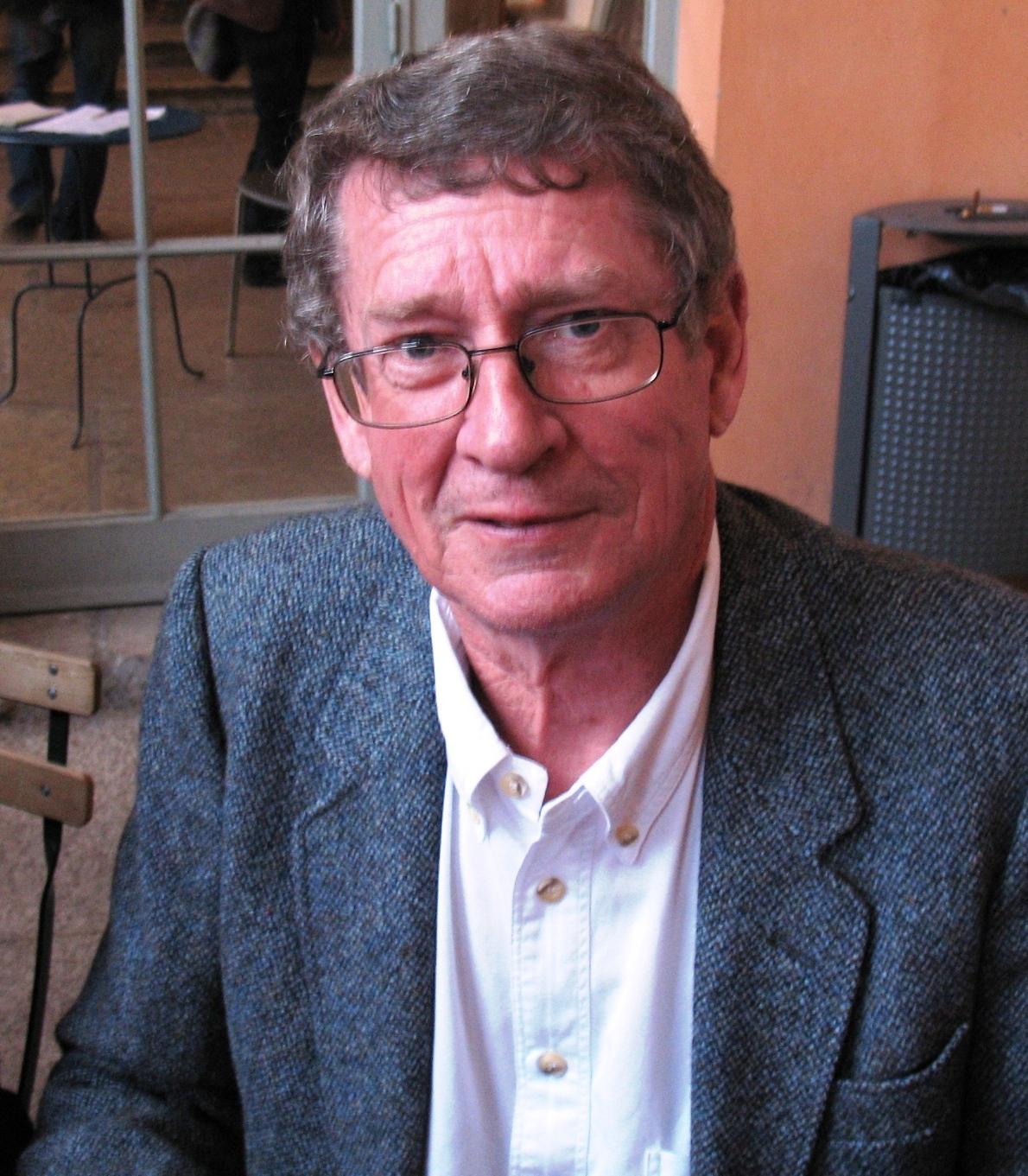
André Brink

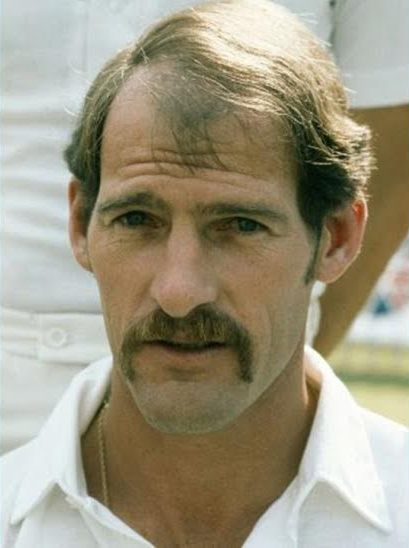
Clive Rice

- 6 – Johannes de Villiers Graaff (86), neoclassical welfare economist
- 7 – Archie Radebe (55), soccer player and coach
- 12 – Gabriel Ramushwana (73), general and Head of State of the Republic of Venda.
- 15 – Walter Westbrook (93), artist
- 23 – Jackie Selebi (64), former National Police Commissioner convicted in August 2010 of corruption, racketeering and fraud.
- 24 – Sir David Graaff, 3rd Baronet (74), businessman and winemaker
- 29 – Cedric Kushner (66), South African-born American boxing promoter

=== February ===
- 1 – Patrick Ngcobo (43) carnatic singer.
- 6 – André Brink (79), novelist, playwright and member of the Die Sestigers, a movement that utilised Afrikaans literature as a means to speak out against apartheid.

=== March ===
- 7 March – Samuel Dickenson Nxumalo (90), the third and last Chief Minister of Gazankulu
- 8 March – Colonel H.W. "Bees" Marais (71), experienced helicopter pilot, dies during a forced landing while water-bombing fires at Olifantsbos near Cape Point.
- 9 – Tjol Lategan (89) rugby union player.
- – Nkululeko Habedi (38) rapper
- 15 – Collins Chabane (54), Minister of Public Service and Administration from 26 May 2014 until his death.
- 19 – Steve Mokone (82) footballer (Heracles Almelo).
- 19 – Ken Owen (80), journalist and editor.
- 21 – Sharon Tandy (71) singer.

=== April ===
- 5 – Louis Miles Muggleton (92) South African-born British physicist.
- 7 – Richard Henyekane (31) soccer player
- 21 – John Moshoeu (49) soccer player (Kaizer Chiefs, Giant Blackpool, national team), African Cup of Nations champion (1996).

=== May ===
- 12 – Ruth Mompati (89), politician and leader of the Women’s March on 9 August 1956

=== June ===
- 7 – Sean Pappas (48), golfer and coach
- 20 – Esther Brand (92), athlete and gold medalist at the 1952 Summer Olympics held in Helsinki, Finland.

=== July ===
- 5 – David Masondo (67) singer and drummer
- 28 – Clive Rice (66), international cricketer

=== September ===
- 1 – Thembile Skweyiya (76), South African Constitutional Court judge from 2003 to 2014.

=== October ===
- 25 – Cecil Lolo (27), professional footballer

=== November ===
- 3 – Lauretta Ngcobo (84), novelist and essayist
- 11 – Nancy Charton (95), first female ordained priest in the Anglican Church of Southern Africa
- 17 – John Gainsford (77), rugby union player

== See also ==
- 2015 in South African television
