= 2013 in South Africa =

- Decades: 1990s; 2000s; 2010s; 2020s
- See also: List of years in South Africa

Events in the year 2013 in South Africa.

== Incumbents ==
- President – Jacob Zuma
- Deputy President – Kgalema Motlanthe
- Chief Justice – Mogoeng Mogoeng

=== Cabinet ===
The Cabinet, together with the President and the Deputy President, forms part of the Executive.

=== Provincial Premiers ===
- Eastern Cape Province: Noxolo Kiviet
- Free State Province: Ace Magashule
- Gauteng Province: Nomvula Mokonyane
- KwaZulu-Natal Province: Zweli Mkhize (until 22 August), Senzo Mchunu (since 22 August)
- Limpopo Province: Cassel Mathale (until 18 July), Stanley Mathabatha (since 18 July)
- Mpumalanga Province: David Mabuza
- North West Province: Thandi Modise
- Northern Cape Province: Hazel Jenkins (until 2 April), Sylvia Lucas (since 2 April)
- Western Cape Province: Helen Zille

== Events ==
January

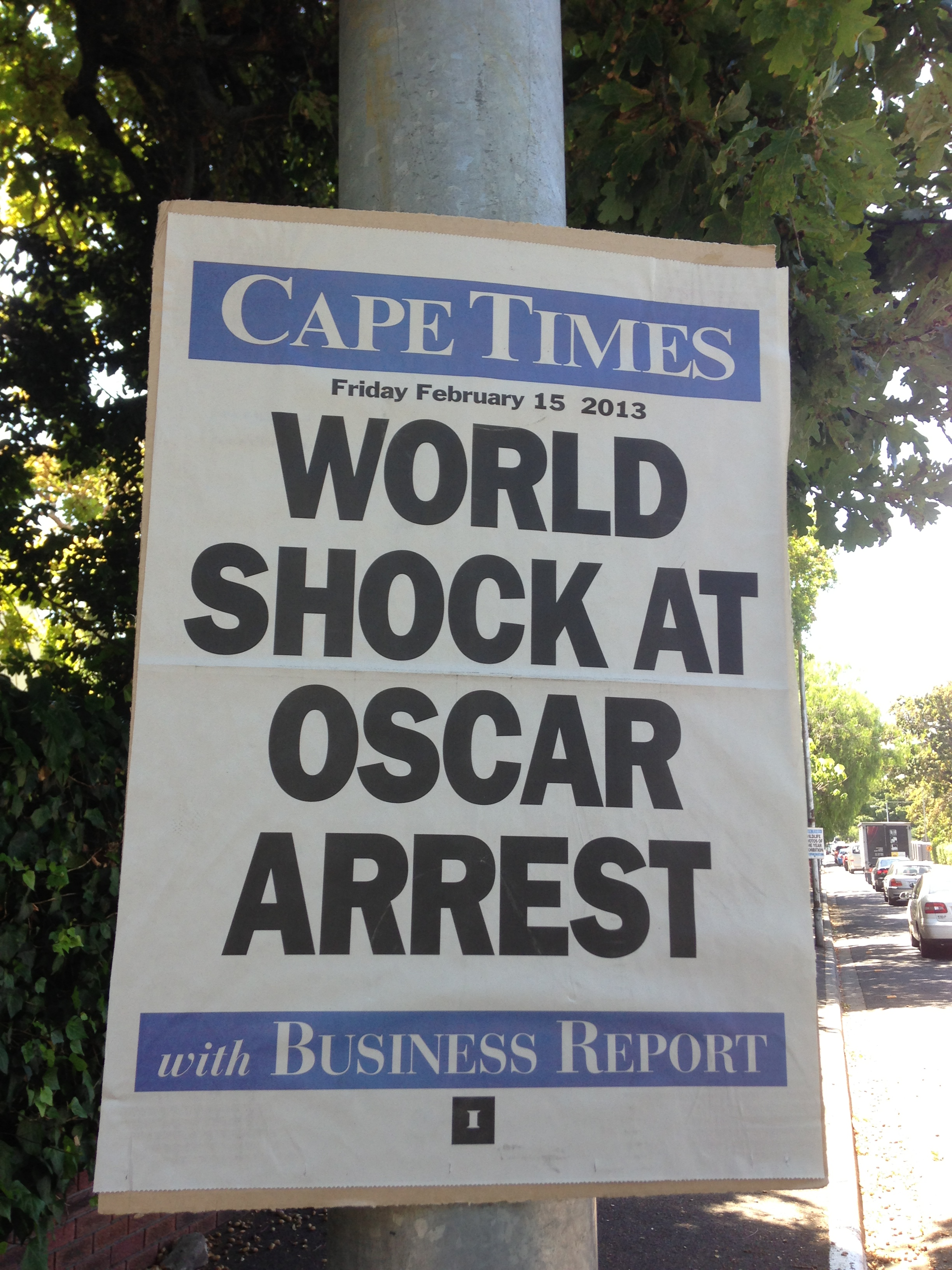
Cape Times billboard following the arrest of Pistorius in February 2013

- 3 – South African Olympic mountain biker and former age group world champion Burry Stander is killed in a road accident while training near his home.
- 6
  - President Jacob Zuma deploys 400 SANDF troops to the Central African Republic in an attempt to bring peace and stability to the region.
  - President Jacob Zuma announces that South African anti-apartheid leader Nelson Mandela has recovered from his lung infection and a surgical procedure to remove gallstones.
- 9 – South Africa police fire rubber bullets and tear gas to disperse striking farm workers in the Western Cape region.
- 10 – Fitch Group downgrades South Africa's long term foreign currency Issuer Default Rating to 'BBB' from 'BBB+' and long-term local currency IDR to BBB+ from A.
- 15 – Anglo American subsidiary Anglo American Platinum announces it will mothball its two least profitable South African platinum mines, sell another and cut 14,000 jobs.
- 16 – Workers at three of Anglo American Platinum's mines go on illegal strike.
- 19 to 10 February – The 2013 Africa Cup of Nations takes place in South Africa and is won by Nigeria, with the Burkina Faso as the runner-up.
- 21 – A South African court finds Nigerian militant Henry Okah guilty of masterminding a 2010 car bombing which killed 12 people in Abuja.
- 24 – 15,000 crocodiles escape from a farm after flooding.

February

- 14 – Paralympian Oscar Pistorius shoots and kills model Reeva Steenkamp at his Pretoria home in the early hours of the morning.

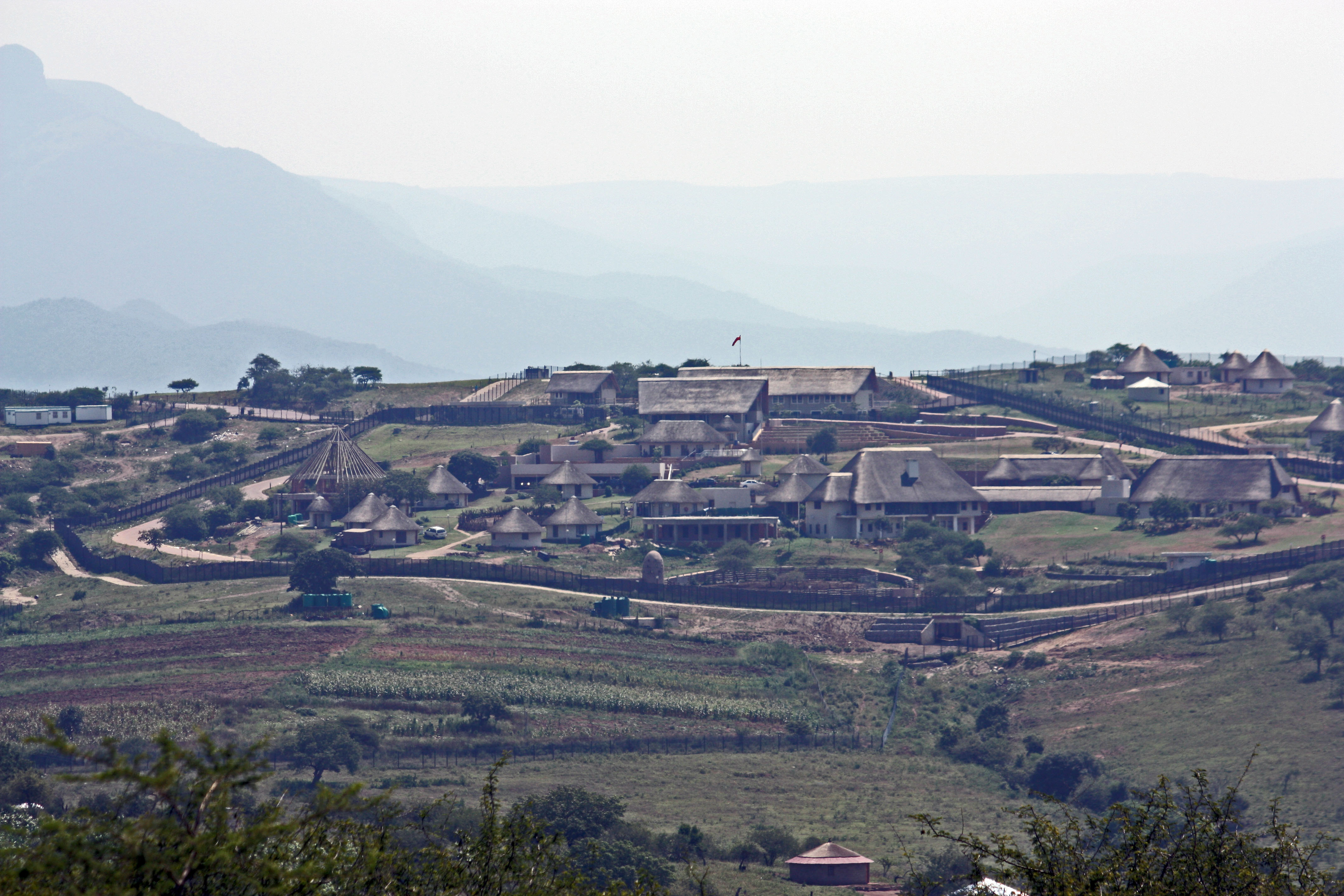
President Jacob Zuma's R246-million Nkandla homestead

March

- 22-24 – The Battle of Bangui takes place in the Central African Republic.

November

- 21 – Ministers of Police Nathi Mthethwa, Public Works Thulas Nxesi, State Security Siyabonga Cwele and Defence Nosiviwe Mapisa-Nqakula declare that, since it is a National Key Point, it is illegal to publish photographs of President Jacob Zuma's controversial Nkandla residence on which R206 million in public funds has been spent.
- 29 – The confidential preliminary report by Public Protector Thuli Madonsela on public expenditure on President Jacob Zuma's Nkandla residence is leaked in the press.

December

- 5 – President Nelson Mandela dies at about 20:50 in his house in Houghton, Johannesburg.
- 10 – The State memorial service for Nelson Mandela was held in the Soccer City stadium in Soweto. It was attended by more than 140 heads of state, heads of government and royal sovereigns, along with dozens of leaders of international organizations (among them Ban Ki-moon, Irina Bokova, Nkosazana Dlamini-Zuma, José Manuel Barroso, Barack Obama, David Cameron, François Hollande, Joachim Gauck, Enrico Letta, Stephen Harper, Dilma Rousseff and Tony Abbott). Over 185 countries and 30 international organizations were represented.

In this event, President Jacob Zuma is booed repeatedly by thousands of the attendees.

- 11 – Thamsanqa Jantjie, the sign language interpreter at the memorial service for Nelson Mandela, is exposed as a fake signer who merely made incomprehensible gestures, has a criminal record and is undergoing psychiatric treatment.
- 24 – The annual televised Presidential Christmas message by the President of South Africa is delivered by Deputy President of South Africa Kgalema Motlanthe instead.

== Deaths ==
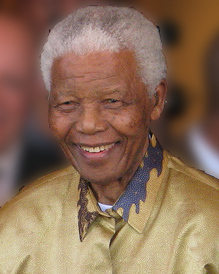
5 December: Nelson Mandela - Anti-apartheid activist and first democratically elected President of South Africa

- 3 January – Burry Stander (25), Olympic (2008, 2012) mountain biker, dies in a traffic collision.
- 6 January – Neil Adcock (81), cricketer, dies of bowel cancer.
- 28 January – Victor Mhleli Ntoni (65), musician. (born. 1947)
- 2 February – Anene Booysen (17), is raped and murdered. (b. 1995)
- 14 February – Reeva Steenkamp (29) model and girlfriend of sprint runner Oscar Pistorius.
- 28 March – Johan Kemp (35), rugby union player, is shot.
- 5 July – Vice Admiral Lambert "Woody" Woodburne" DVR SD SM (1952 version) and SM (1975 version) (73), former Chief of the South African Navy.
- 12 October – Glen Dell (51), pilot (injuries from air show accident)
- 29 November – Colin Eglin (88), politician, former Leader of the Opposition.
- 5 December – President Nelson Mandela (95) dies after a long sickbed. (b. 1918)
- 7 December – Jacob "Baby Jake" Matlala (51), flyweight world champion boxer.

== Railways ==
=== Locomotives ===
- The first ten of ninety-five 3 kV DC and 25 kV AC dual voltage Class 20E electric locomotives for Transnet Freight Rail are being built in China by CSL Zhuzhou.

== See also ==
- 2013 in South African television
