= 2014 in South Africa =

- Decades: 1990s; 2000s; 2010s; 2020s
- See also: List of years in South Africa

Events in the year 2014 in South Africa.

== Incumbents ==
- President – Jacob Zuma
- Deputy President – Kgalema Motlanthe (until 26 May), Cyril Ramaphosa (starting 26 May)
- Chief Justice – Mogoeng Mogoeng

=== Cabinet ===
The Cabinet, together with the President and the Deputy President, forms part of the Executive.

=== Provincial Premiers ===
- Eastern Cape Province: Noxolo Kiviet (until 21 May), Phumulo Masualle (since 21 May)
- Free State Province: Ace Magashule
- Gauteng Province: Nomvula Mokonyane (until 21 May), David Makhura (since 21 May)
- KwaZulu-Natal Province: Senzo Mchunu
- Limpopo Province: Stanley Mathabatha
- Mpumalanga Province: David Mabuza
- North West Province: Thandi Modise (until 20 May), Supra Mahumapelo (since 20 May)
- Northern Cape Province: Sylvia Lucas
- Western Cape Province: Helen Zille

== Events ==
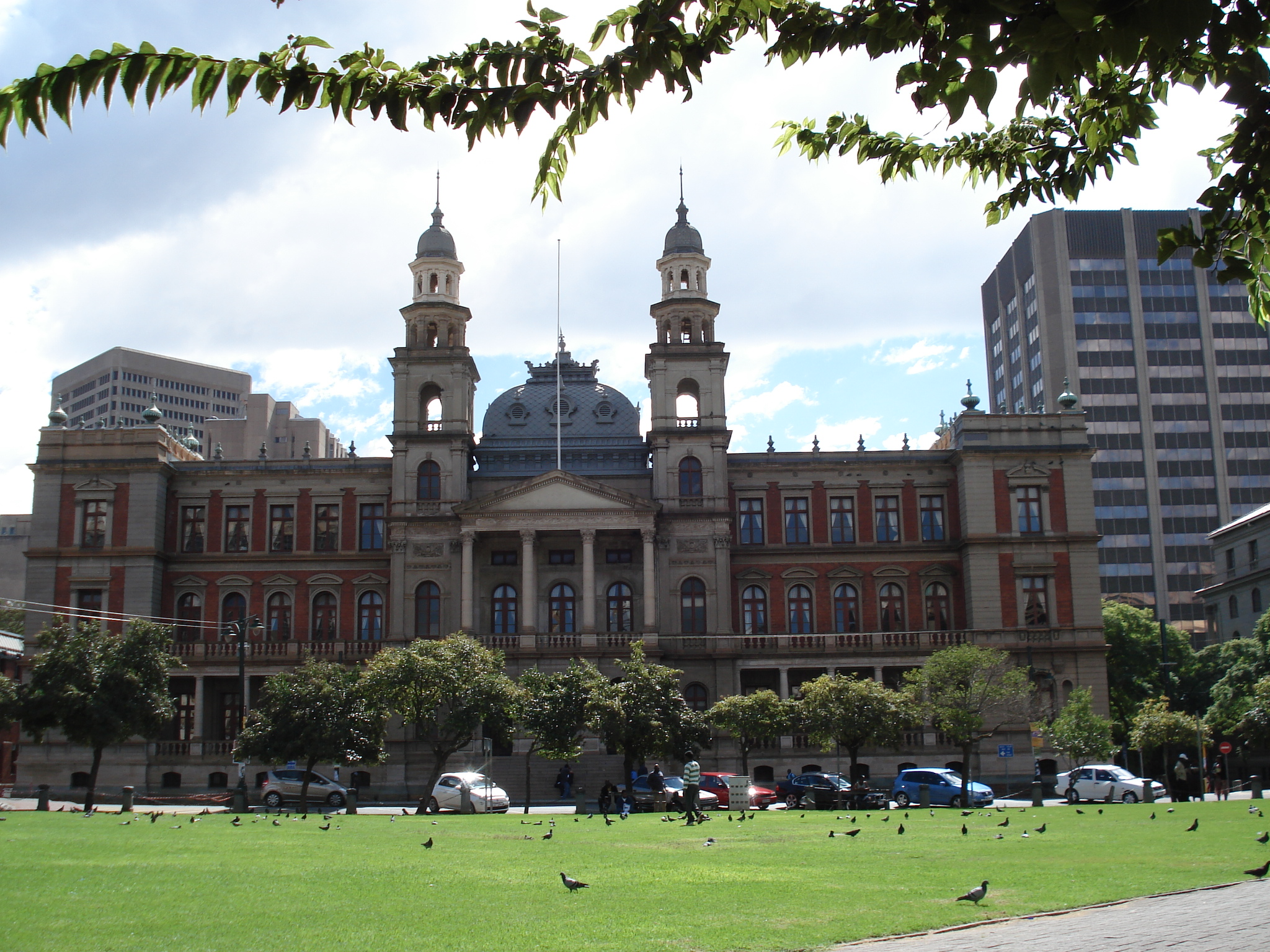
The Palace of Justice in Pretoria, where the Trial of Oscar Pistorius took place

January

- 6 – Minister of Basic Education Angie Motshekga announces a record 78.2% national pass rate in the 2013 matric examinations, achieved by lowering the minimum passing requirement to 40% in three subjects and 30% in the rest.
- 20 – Minister of Sport and Recreation Fikile Mbalula calls Bafana Bafana "just a bunch of unbearable, useless individuals" after losing 3–1 at Cape Town Stadium against the Nigeria national football team in the African Nations Championship.

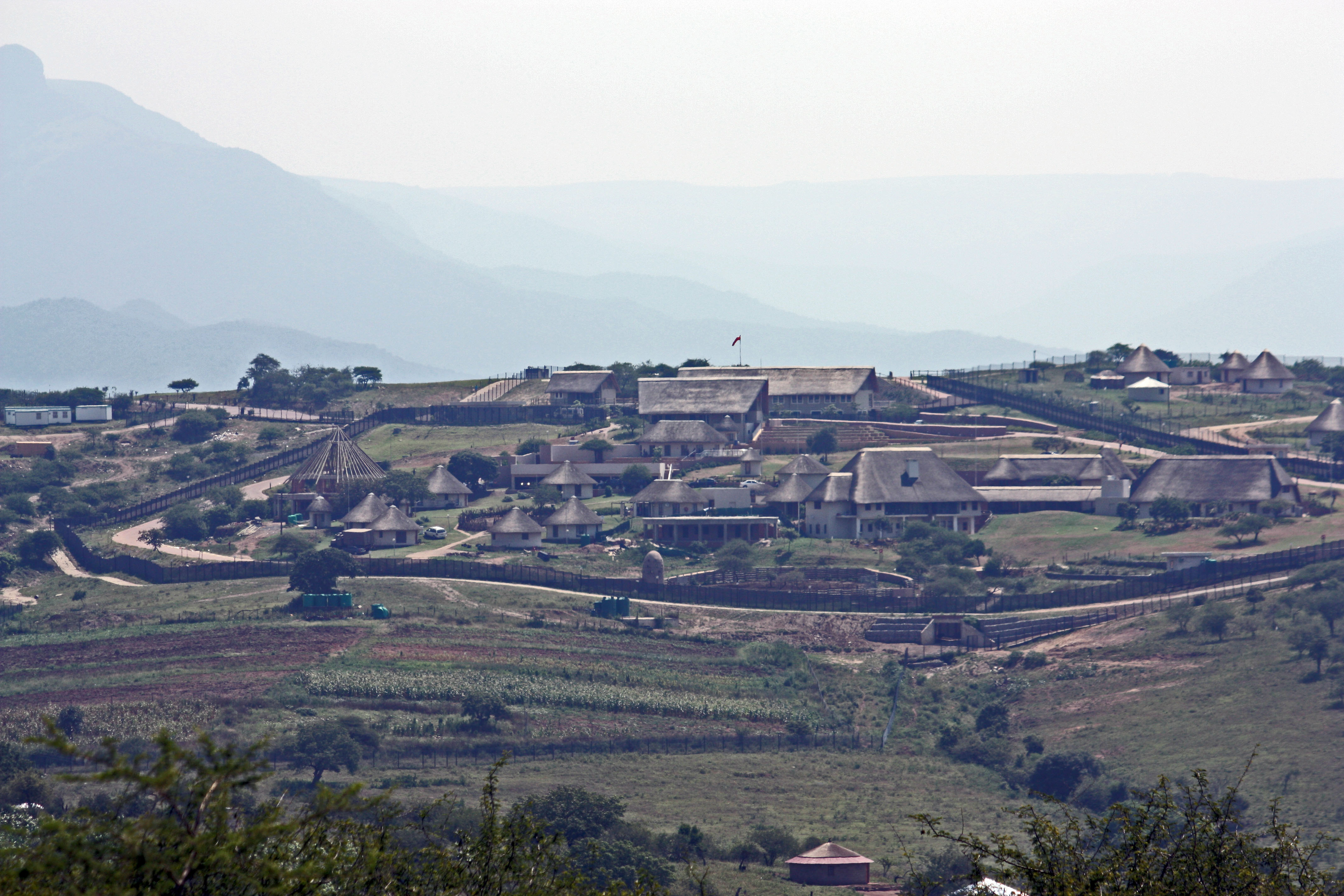
President Jacob Zuma's R246-million Nkandla homestead

March

- 3 – The Trial of Oscar Pistorius for the murder of his girlfriend Reeva Steenkamp begins in Pretoria.
- 5 – President Jacob Zuma is booed by the crowd attending the Bafana Bafana v. Brazil national football team friendly soccer match at Soccer City stadium in Soweto that was won 5–0 by Brazil.
- 19 – The damning final report by Public Protector Thuli Madonsela on R246,000,000 of public expenditure on President Jacob Zuma's private Nkandla residence is released.

May

- 7 – The 2014 National Elections take place and the African National Congress remains in power with 249 seats in Parliament, while the Democratic Alliance wins 89, the Economic Freedom Fighters 25 and the Inkatha Freedom Party 10. The remaining 27 seats are filled by representatives from nine smaller parties.

August

- 4 – ANC Member of Parliament and former Cabinet Minister Pallo Jordan, who used the title Doctor on his official CV, is exposed as having no tertiary qualifications whatsoever.
- 5 – An earthquake with a magnitude of 5.5 on the Richter magnitude scale, the biggest in South Africa since the 1969 Tulbagh earthquake, is felt as far as 600 kilometres from its epicentre at Orkney, North West. One person was killed in the approximately 90-second earthquake.

September

- 4 – Tapes said to contain conversations that led to corruption charges against President Jacob Zuma being dropped are handed over to the Democratic Alliance, after a ruling by the Supreme Court of Appeal.
- 26 – The 2014 World Summit of Nobel Peace Laureates, to be held in Cape Town from 13 to 15 October, is suspended after a boycott of Nobel Laureates to protest the third time refusal of a visa to the Dalai Lama by a South African Government "kowtowing to China".

October

- 6 – The trial of Shrien Dewani, who was accused of masterminding the murder of his wife Anni Dewani, commenced at the Western Cape High Court, following his extradition from Britain in April 2014. At the conclusion of the trial in December 2014, he was exonerated, the Court ruling that there was no credible evidence to support the allegations against him, nor to support the allegation that the crime was a premeditated murder for hire.
- 21 – Paralympian Oscar Pistorius receives a maximum sentence of five years for the culpable homicide of his girlfriend Reeva Steenkamp after being found not guilty of murder by Judge Thokozile Masipa.
- 26 – Senzo Meyiwa, captain of the South Africa national football team "Bafana Bafana" and the Orlando Pirates Premier Soccer League team, is shot dead during a robbery at his girlfriend Kelly Khumalo's house during which only a cellphone is stolen.

December

- 12-14 – The 14th World Summit of Nobel Peace Laureates takes place in Rome.
- 14 – Rolene Strauss is crowned as Miss World 2014 during the 64th Miss World pageant, the second South African to win the title outright after Penny Coelen in 1958 and the third to hold the title after Anneline Kriel in 1974.

== Deaths ==
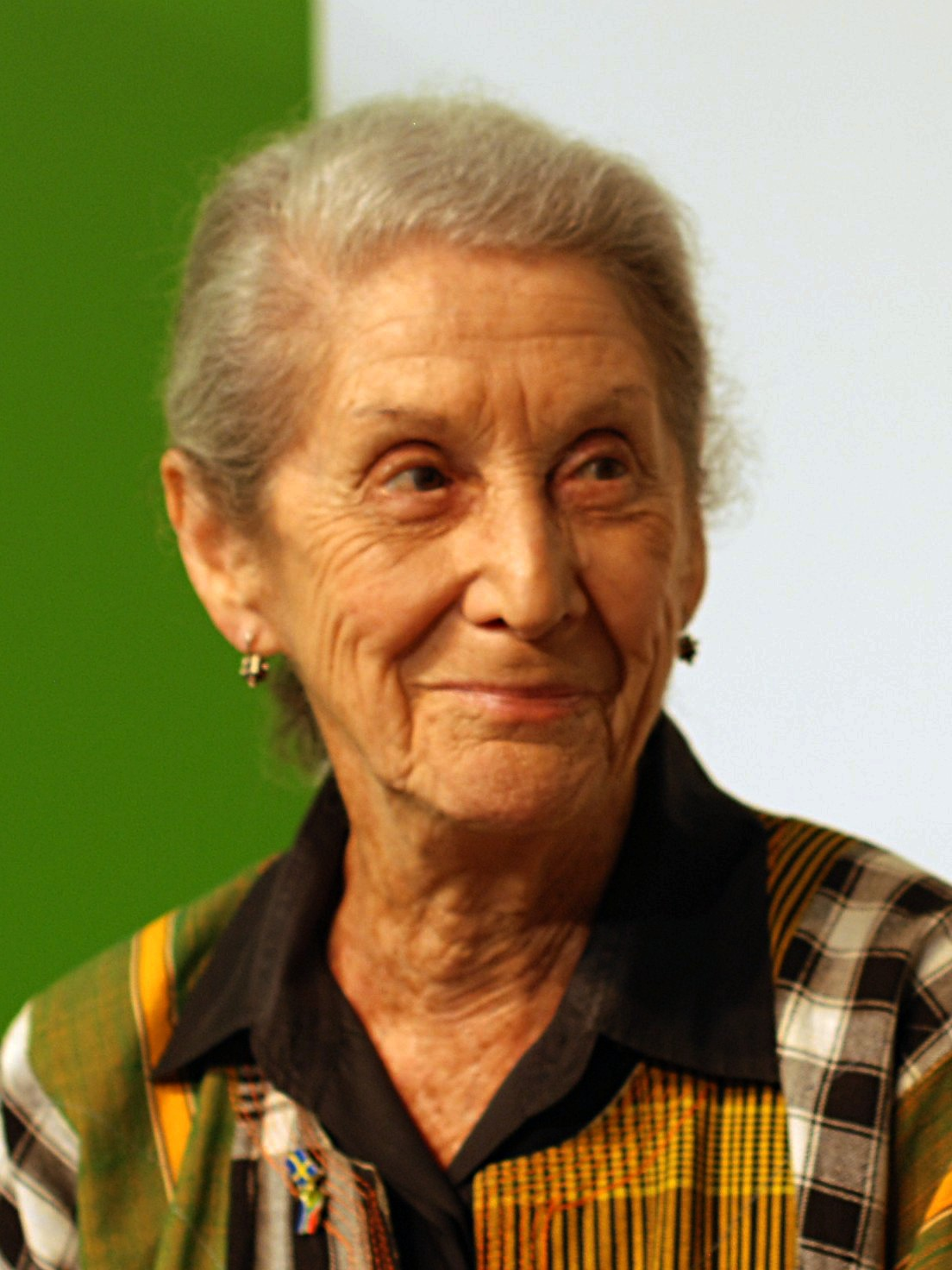
Nadine Gordimer

- 7 January 2014 – Lieutenant-Colonel A.P. (Aap) Möller HC (66), first recipient of the Honoris Crux decoration for gallantry in action on 26 January 1973.
- 10 January – Colonel C.J.A. (Chris) Prins (80), founder and first leader of the Silver Falcons aerobatic display team of the South African Air Force that was established in 1967, flying Impala Mk I trainers with team members Fred du Toit, Theuns Prinsloo and Chris Hattingh.
- 10 January – Isilo, one of the country's largest elephants, considered a National Heritage artifact.
- 7 June – Epainette Mbeki, South African political activist, the widow of anti-apartheid Govan Mbeki and the mother of former president Thabo Mbeki.
- 12 June – Lieutenant-Colonel E.B. (Fink) Elphick CA (64), first recipient of the Air Force Cross for his leading role as helicopter commander during the rescue operation to airlift passengers and crew from the listing and sinking ship MTS Oceanos on 4 August 1991.
- 20 June – Michael Coetzee (54), trade union leader and activist
- 13 July – Nadine Gordimer (90), writer, political activist and recipient of the 1991 Nobel Prize in Literature.
- 17 July – Vice Admiral Dries Putter SSAS SD MMM (79), twice Chief of the South African Navy.
- 22 August – Verna Vels (81), writer, television personality and creator of Liewe Heksie children's series
- 31 August – Ollie Viljoen (75), musician, entertainer and storyteller.
- 2 September – Norman Gordon (103), cricketer, oldest ever test cricketer
- 1 October – Tsiame Kenneth Mopeli (84), Chief Minister of QwaQwa
- 26 October – Senzo Meyiwa (30), goalkeeper and captain of both Orlando Pirates and South Africa
- 12 November – John Briscoe (66), water engineer
- 14 November – Marius Barnard (87), surgeon and politician

== See also ==
- 2014 in South African television
