= 2016 in South Africa =

- Decades: 1990s; 2000s; 2010s; 2020s
- See also: List of years in South Africa

Events that have occurred in 2016 in South Africa. The incumbent President of South Africa was Jacob Zuma who was first elected in 2009 and was re-elected in 2014. South Africa held municipal elections in 2016. The African National Congress remained the largest party in most municipalities, however, the Democratic Alliance took control of Johannesburg and Tshwane through minority governments and of Nelson Mandela Bay (Port Elizabeth) through a coalition. In international sport, a South African team of 68 athletes competed at the 2016 Summer Olympics. South Africa hosted the 2016 Africa Futsal Cup of Nations in April.

== Incumbents ==
- President – Jacob Zuma
- Deputy President – Cyril Ramaphosa
- Chief Justice – Mogoeng Mogoeng

=== Cabinet ===
The Cabinet, together with the President and the Deputy President, forms part of the Executive.

=== Provincial Premiers ===
- Eastern Cape Province: Phumulo Masualle
- Free State Province: Ace Magashule
- Gauteng Province: David Makhura
- KwaZulu-Natal Province: Senzo Mchunu (until 24 May), Willies Mchunu (since 24 May)
- Limpopo Province: Stanley Mathabatha
- Mpumalanga Province: David Mabuza
- North West Province: Supra Mahumapelo
- Northern Cape Province: Sylvia Lucas
- Western Cape Province: Helen Zille

== Events ==
=== February ===
- February 1-April 4 - 2016 Varsity Shield - Rugby
- February 8-April 11 - 2016 Varsity Cup - Rugby
- February 26-July 16 - 2016 Super Rugby season

=== March ===
- March 22 - Death of Sikhosiphi Rhadebe

=== April ===
- April 9-July 23 - 2016 Currie Cup qualification - Rugby
- April 15–24 - 2016 Africa Futsal Cup of Nations - Football

=== May ===
- May 18 - South African municipal elections, 2016

=== June ===
- June 20–23 - The Tswane riots in which five people die occur in Pretoria and across the metropolitan area.

=== August ===
- August–October - 2016 Currie Cup First Division - Rugby
- August–October - 2016 Currie Cup Premier Division - Rugby
- August 5–21 - 68 athletes from South Africa will compete at the 2016 Summer Olympics in Rio de Janeiro, Brazil
- August 27-October 8 - 2016 Rugby Championship

=== September ===
- September 10-October 29 - 2016 Gold Cup - Rugby

== Deaths ==
=== August ===
- 15 – Makhenkesi Stofile, 71, South African politician and diplomat, Premier of the Eastern Cape (1997–2004), Minister of Sport and Recreation (2004–2010), Ambassador to Germany (since 2011).

=== September ===
- 18 - Mandoza, 38, South African Kwaito Star.

=== December ===
- 5 – Sfiso Ncwane, 37, South African singer.

== See also ==
- 2016 in South African television
