= 2017 in South Africa =

- Decades: 1990s; 2000s; 2010s; 2020s
- See also: List of years in South Africa

The following lists events that happened during 2017 in South Africa.

== Incumbents ==
=== National Government ===
- President: Jacob Zuma (ANC)
- Deputy President: Cyril Ramaphosa (ANC)
- Leader of the Opposition: Mmusi Maimane
- Chief Justice: Mogoeng Mogoeng
- Deputy Chief Justice:
  - Bess Nkabinde (Acting)
  - Raymond Zondo (since 7 June 2017)
- President of the Supreme Court of Appeal:
  - Lex Mpati
  - Mandisa Maya (since 26 May 2017)
- Deputy President of the Supreme Court of Appeal:
  - Mandisa Maya
  - Vacant (since 26 May 2017)
- Chairperson of the Electoral Court of South Africa: Khayelihle Kenneth Mthiyane
- Speaker of the National Assembly: Baleka Mbete (ANC)
- Chairperson of the National Council of Provinces: Thandi Modise (ANC)

==== Cabinet ====
The Cabinet, together with the President and the Deputy President, forms part of the Executive.

=== Provincial Premiers ===
- Eastern Cape Province: Phumulo Masualle (ANC)
- Free State Province: Ace Magashule (ANC)
- Gauteng Province: David Makhura (ANC)
- KwaZulu-Natal Province: Willies Mchunu (ANC)
- Limpopo Province: Stanley Mathabatha (ANC)
- Mpumalanga Province: David Mabuza (ANC)
- North West Province: Supra Mahumapelo (ANC)
- Northern Cape Province: Sylvia Lucas (ANC)
- Western Cape Province: Helen Zille (DA)

== Events ==
Events that have occurred in 2017 in South Africa.

=== January ===
- 18 December 2016 - 10 February 2017 – Sri Lanka cricket team tours South Africa. The series consists of a tour match, three Test matches, three Twenty20 International matches (T20Is) and five One Day International matches (ODIs). The tour starts on 18 December 2016 (with the Tour match), while the series starts on 26 December (with the first Test that is played at St George's Park, Port Elizabeth). The tour ends on 10 February (with the final ODI that is played at SuperSport Park, Centurion). South Africa won the Test and ODI series, 3-0 and 5-0 respectively, while Sri Lanka won the T20I series 1–2.
- 1 January – President Jacob Zuma hosts the annual Indlamu dance festival. "The essence of the festival is to mark the beginning of the new year and to promote indigenous culture and heritage."
- 4 January – Minister Angie Motshekga release the 2016 National Senior Certificate examination results at Vodaworld in Midrand, Gauteng.

=== February ===
- February 9 – President Jacob Zuma presented the State of the Nation (SONA2017) to a joint sitting of the two Houses of Parliament (National Assembly and National Council of Provinces) at 19:00. This was his fourth SONA to the joint sitting of Parliament, since being re-elected in May 2014.
- February 22 – Finance Minister Pravin Gordhan presented the Budget for 2017–18 to Parliament.

=== December ===
- December 2 - The CBeebies children’s game show Kerwhizz started premiering on M-Net for the first time in HD, which started airing on Saturdays at 6AM from December 2, 2017 until March 24, 2018, along with Big & Small and Maya the Bee, which both starts at 7AM and 8AM.

== Deaths ==
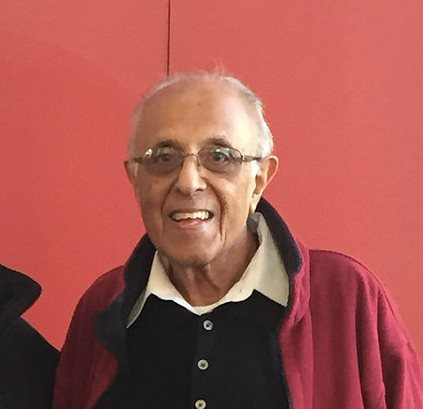
Ahmed Mohamed Kathrada

=== January ===
- January 15
  - Thandi Klaasen, South African jazz musician, recipient of South Africa's Order of the Baobab (b. 1930/1931)

=== February ===
- February 6
  - Joost van der Westhuizen, South African rugby player, part of South Africa's 1995 World Cup winning squad (b. 1971)

=== March ===
- March 18
  - Joe Mafela, South African artist, and actor (b. 1942)
- March 28
  - Ahmed Kathrada, South African activist and politician (b. 1929)

=== November ===
- November 30
  - Eddie Daniels, South African former anti-apartheid activist (b. 1928)

=== December ===
- December 8
  - Laloo Chiba, South African politician and revolutionary (b. 1930)
