= Blackheath train accident =

Commuter train crashed into a minibus taxi

Details
- Date: August 25, 2010; 15 years ago 07:03
- Location: Blackheath, Blue Downs, Western Cape; 26 km (16 mi) ESE from Cape Town
- Coordinates: 33.9702°S 18.7059°E
- Country: South Africa
- Line: Bellville–Stellenbosch
- Operator: Metrorail
- Incident type: Level crossing accident

Statistics
- Trains: 1
- Deaths: 9
- Injured: 5

The Blackheath train accident occurred at 7:03 a.m. on 25 August 2010 when a Metrorail commuter train crashed into a minibus taxi on the Buttskop Road level crossing in Blackheath, a suburb of Cape Town, South Africa. The minibus was carrying fourteen children to school; nine died on the scene and five were hospitalised. One of the injured children died two days later in the Red Cross War Memorial Children's Hospital. The minibus driver was also hospitalised; there were no injuries aboard the train.

An initial investigation by the Railway Safety Regulator determined that the lights and booms at the crossing were in full working order. Witnesses stated that the minibus drove around a queue of stopped cars and past the closed half-booms blocking the crossing. The driver, Jacob Humphreys, was arrested upon being released from hospital and charged with ten counts of culpable homicide; he was initially held in custody but was later released on bail. On 12 December 2011 he was convicted in the Western Cape High Court on ten counts of murder and four counts of attempted murder and on 28 February 2012 he was sentenced to an effective twenty years in prison. On 22 March 2013 the Supreme Court of Appeal reduced the conviction to culpable homicide and the sentence to an effective eight years' imprisonment.

== See also ==
- 2010 in rail transport
- 2010 in South Africa
- Rail transport in South Africa
- List of level crossing accidents
- List of rail accidents (2010-present)
- Gilchrest Road, New York crossing accident, 1972 accident involving U.S. school bus driver who also tried to beat a train at a crossing, killing five students
