= 2012 in South African television =

This is a list of South African television related events from 2012.

== Events ==
- 2 October - Khaya Mthethwa wins the eighth season of Idols South Africa, becoming the show's first South African black person to have won.
- 18 October - 11-year-old poet Botlhale Boikanyo wins the third season of SA's Got Talent.

== Debuts ==
=== International ===
- 18 January - (United States) Lights Out (M-Net Series)
- 19 January - (United States) Person of Interest (M-Net Series)
- 10 February - (United States) Hart of Dixie (M-Net Series)
- 25 February - (United States) Once Upon a Time (M-Net Series)
- 14 March - (United States) 2 Broke Girls (M-Net)
- 6 April - (United States) Jane by Design (M-Net Series)
- 7 April - (United States) Missing (2012) (M-Net)
- 29 May - (United States) Alcatraz (M-Net)
- 16 June - (United States) Common Law (2012) (M-Net)
- 28 June - (United States) The Finder (M-Net Series)
- 13 July - (Canada) Little Mosque on the Prairie (SABC 3)
- 17 July - (Canada) Life with Boys (SABC 1)
- 17 July - (United States) Baggage (Sony Channel)
- 24 August - (United States) Luck (M-Net)
- 28 August - (United States) Dallas (2012) (M-Net)
- 30 August - (Canada) King (Sony Channel)
- 4 September - (United States) Necessary Roughness (M-Net Series)
- 18 September - (United States) Suits (M-Net)
- 19 October - (United States) Arrow (M-Net)
- 6 November - (United States) Chicago Fire (M-Net)
- 27 November - (Canada) / (United States) Combat Hospital (M-Net Series)
- 3 December - (Canada) / (France) XIII: The Series (M-Net Series)
- 3 December - (United States) The Exes (SABC 3)
- 3 December - (United States) Are We There Yet? (Mzansi Magic)
- (United States) Jake and the Neverland Pirates (SABC 3)
- 13 December - (United States) No Kitchen Required (SABC 3)
- (United States) / (Japan) Power Rangers Samurai (E.tv)
- (Australia) Bananas in Pyjamas (CGI) (E.tv)
- (United States) / (Canada) Voltron Force (SABC 1)

=== Changes of network affiliation ===
Shows	Moved from	Moved to
(United States) Raising Hope	M-Net	M-Net Series
(United States) Common Law (2012)	M-Net	M-Net Series
(United States) Franklin & Bash	M-Net	M-Net Series
(United States) Missing (2012)	M-Net	M-Net Series
(United States) 2 Broke Girls	M-Net	Vuzu
(United Kingdom) Everything's Rosie	CBeebies	E.tv
(United States) Modern Family	Vuzu	E.tv
(United States) The Unit	SABC 1	SABC 2
(United States) Justified	M-Net Series	SABC 1
(United States) Rizzoli & Isles	M-Net Series	M-Net Series Zone
(United States) The Glades	M-Net Action	M-Net Series

== Television shows ==
=== 1980s ===
- Good Morning South Africa (1985–present)
- Carte Blanche (1988–present)

=== 1990s ===
- Top Billing (1992–present)
- Generations (1994–present)
- Isidingo (1998–present)

=== 2000s ===
- Idols South Africa (2002–present)
- Rhythm City (2007–present)
- SA's Got Talent (2009–present)

== See also ==
- 2012 in South Africa
