= Pam Golding =

South African real estate developer (1928–2018)

- Born: 12 September 1928; Umtata, South Africa
- Died: 3 April 2018 (aged 89); Cape Town, South Africa
- Education: University of Cape Town
- Occupations: Founder and life president of the Pam Golding Property Group
- Spouse: Cecil Golding
- Website: www.pamgolding.co.za

Pam Golding (née Stroebel; 12 September 1928 – 3 April 2018) was a South African real estate developer. Pam Golding Properties, which she founded in 1976, is one of the largest real estate groups in South Africa, with over 300 offices in sub-Saharan Africa and overseas. Golding's son, Andrew Golding, is currently the company's CEO. She died 3 April 2018, aged 89, at her home in Cape Town, South Africa.
