= Arthur Bartman =

South African soccer player (1972–2019)

Personal information
- Date of birth: 26 March 1972
- Place of birth: Pietermaritzburg, KwaZulu-Natal, South Africa
- Date of death: 19 March 2019 (aged 46)
- Place of death: Life East London Private Hospital, East London, South Africa
- Height: 1.83 m (6 ft 0 in)
- Position: Goalkeeper

Senior career*
Years	Team	Apps	(Gls)
1997–1998	African Wanderers		
1998–1999	Kaizer Chiefs		
1999–2001	African Wanderers		
2001–2002	Bush Bucks		
2002–2003	Moroka Swallows		
2003–2004	SuperSport United		
2008–2009	Bay United		
2009–2013	Kaizer Chiefs		
2014	Golden Arrows		
- * Club domestic league appearances and goals

Arthur Bartman (26 March 1972 – 19 March 2019) was a South African football goalkeeper who last played for Kaizer Chiefs in the South African Premier Division.

== Biography ==
Arthur Bartman was a retired footballer from South Africa and a goalkeeper coach at Maritzburg United. He was born in 1972 in Pietermaritzburg and during his playing career he featured for such clubs as Bay United, Moroka Swallows, SuperSport United, Bush Bucks, African Wanderers and Kaizer Chiefs. He joined Kaizer Chiefs in 2009 and had been the first-choice keeper.

In 2014, Bartman retired from playing and opted for coaching work at Maritzburg United.

== Personal life and death ==
Bartman died from meningitis on 19 March 2019, at the age of 46.

== Honours ==
Kaizer Chiefs

- Telkom Knockout: 2010
- MTN 8 runner-up: 2011
