= Open Forum of Cambodia =

Non-profit organization

The Open Forum of Cambodia (OFC) was a not-for-profit organisation that aimed to promote dialogue in Cambodian society. Formed in 1994, it provided the first e-mail service in the country to encourage dialogue and address social concerns.

During its lifespan, OFCs sought to decentralise and democratise the creation and proliferation of news and information through the creation and publication of electronic media and paper-based publications, in both Khmer and English, their projects included:

– The editorialized weekly overview of all local newspapers reflecting the diverse points of views on political and social issues; electronic communication; - A website dedicated to covering the Khmer Rouge Trials; – A 16-page weekly press review of the Cambodian language press in English for 10 years.

OFC advocated and supported Good Governance initiatives including building the journalistic capacity of local students, and the subsequent publishing of news articles through a local newspaper.

OFC also played an important role in the localisation of Free Software into the Khmer language.

Around 2012, OFC has faced a funding crunch and was forced to close.
