= Open Forum (Australia) =

Public policy blogging website

Open Forum is an Australian public policy blogging website hosted by Global Access Partners.

The site was launched after a 2007 survey highlighted the need for an independent, non-partisan, not-for-profit Australian forum to discuss public policy issues. Its contributors include Federal Parliamentarians such as Tony Abbott and Tanya Plibersek.

The site has hosted consultations for State governments and agencies, including a major project on Strata Laws reform and a survey for the Queensland Office for Regulatory Efficiency.

Open Forum solicits articles and opinions from Australian policy-makers, business leaders, academics and the general public as well as republishing material from other sources and highlighting areas of Australian research.

It currently provides a platform for focused dialogue on social, political, economic, environmental and cultural issues and challenges.
