= Patrick Ngcobo =

Zulu singer of Indian music

Patrick Ngcobo (died 1 February 2015) was a Carnatic classic musician born in Kloof (Gillets), Durban, South Africa. He belongs to the warrior Zulu tribe in KwaZulu-Natal province in South Africa. Although he was a Zulu singer he specialized in Indian classic music and could sing songs in seven languages including Tamil, Kannada, Telugu, and Malayalam languages. His teacher was the famous Indian singer Dr. K. J. Yesudas.

He hosted a regular show on Carnatic music on the South African radio station Lotus FM, the first Black South African to do so. He was an ambassador for South Africa's cross cultural diversity, and he expressed himself fully through his love of classical Indian musical arts.

Ngcobo died on 1 February 2015 from kidney failure. On 11 April 2015, the Indian Consulate General and the Indian Cultural Centre in Durban, KwaZulu-Natal, held a memorial concert in his honor.
