= Pam Golding Properties =

South African real estate company

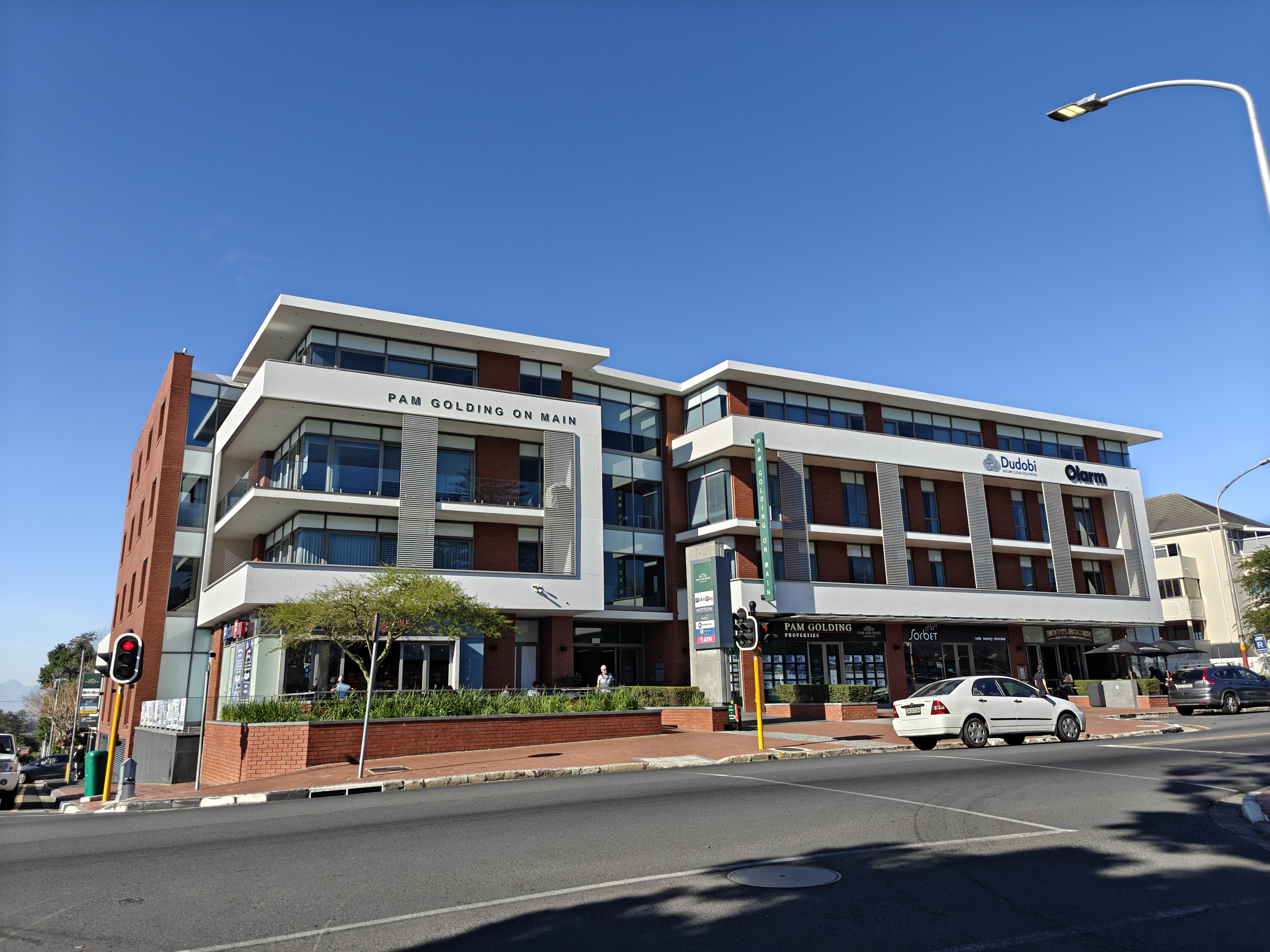
- The Pam Golding on Main building in Kenilworth, Cape Town
- Type: Private
- Industry: Real estate
- Founded: 1976; 50 years ago
- Founder: Pam Golding
- Headquarters: Cape Town, South Africa
- Area served: Sub-Saharan Africa; United Kingdom; Germany; United States; Spain; Portugal; Seychelles
- Key people: Andrew Golding (CEO)
- Services: Property sales, rentals, management, and marketing Consulting
- Divisions: Pam Golding Properties (PGP); Pam Golding Properties Africa; Pam Golding Franchise Services
- Website: pamgolding.co.za

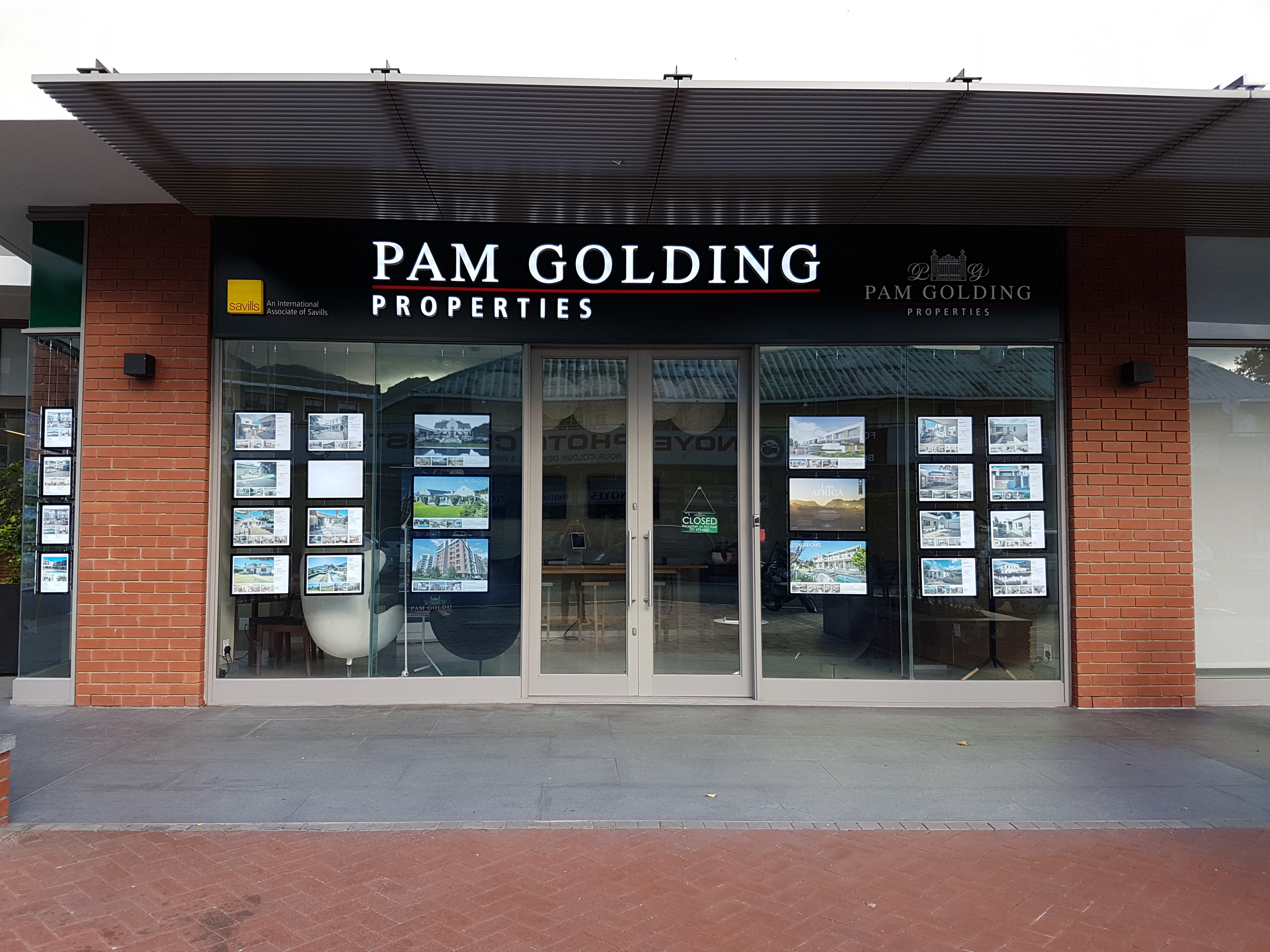
Pam Golding Properties branch in Cape Town

Pam Golding Properties (commonly referred to as Pam Golding) is a South African real estate company that sells and leases properties in numerous markets around the world. Founded in 1976 by realtor Pam Golding, the company is headquartered in Cape Town.

== History ==
Pam Golding Property Group was founded by realtor Pam Golding in 1976. The company subsequently opened an office in London, UK, in 1986.

In 2018, the Pam Golding Property Group acquired Cape Town-based online digital estate agency Eazi.com. CEO Andrew Golding stated that the acquisition would serve as part of the group's strategy to adopt an online, hybrid estate agency model, using technology to reduce costs, as well as access, to a greater degree, a higher volume, lower cost segment of the property market.

In the same year, the company announced a strategic joint venture partnership with BidX1, the second largest auction house in Britain and Ireland, for a digital auction platform.

== Operations ==
Pam Golding operates a network of over 300 offices in Sub-Saharan Africa, as well as offices in the United Kingdom, Germany, Mauritius, and Seychelles. Pam Golding also facilitates property sales and residency in Spain and Portugal, as well as property sales in the United States.

As Pam Golding Property Group, the company operates the following divisions:

- Pam Golding Properties (wholly owned, franchised branch office network for property sales and rentals)
- Pam Golding Projects and International (international marketing and sales of leisure projects)
- Pam Golding Property Management Services (residential sectional title division)
- Pam Golding Africa (sales and marketing network)
- Pam Golding Hospitality (advisory and agency services)
- Pam Golding Mortgage Origination (assistance with mortgage information)

The company is a member of the Franchise Association of South Africa (FASA).

== Corporate social investment ==
In 2015, the company launched the Heart of Gold Trust, aimed at nurturing young talent by investing in the education of youth who do not have adequate financial resources. The Trust partnered with the Make A Difference Leadership Foundation, through which individuals can apply for a Heart of Gold Trust scholarship.

Pam Golding Property Group was also a founding member of the Proudly South African initiative, aimed at promoting local purchasing, in order to combat poverty, inequality, and unemployment.

== Awards ==
Pam Golding Property Group has won awards in categories in the Overseas Property Professional Awards, International Property Awards, African Excellence Awards, and has been awarded Superbrands Status.

Pam Golding was recognized as the Best International Real Estate Agency (2024 to 2025) for over 20 offices, at the International Property Awards, held in February 2025. This was the fifth time, and second consecutive year, that Pam Golding received the award. The company also won Best Real Estate Agency in South Africa, Best Real Estate Agency in Africa, Best Real Estate Agency Marketing in Africa, and Best Real Estate Agency Marketing in South Africa at the same event.

== Controversy ==
In 2020, Pam Golding Properties was investigated over allegedly violating the FIC act by selling properties to the former Mozambican president Armando Guebuza.

Pam Golding allegedly failed to investigate the source of the money used by Guebuza's children to buy R50 million of property.

In 2022, a judge ruled that Pam Golding had laundered money for Armando Guebuza's son.

In July 2025, a Cape Town couple sued Pam Golding over defects in a house they bought via the realtor. The Heldervue (Somerset West) property, purchased for R1.6 million, was allegedly a structural hazard, and not fit for habitation. At the time the couple were residing in the property, a structural engineer identified defects. The couple then spent R600,000 to fix the house, and sued Pam Golding in the Western Cape High Court for R620,000 in damages, claiming they had been misled at the time of purchase. Pam Golding denied being aware of the defects when they sold the home.
