= Wim Richter =

South African chemist and researcher (1946–2019)

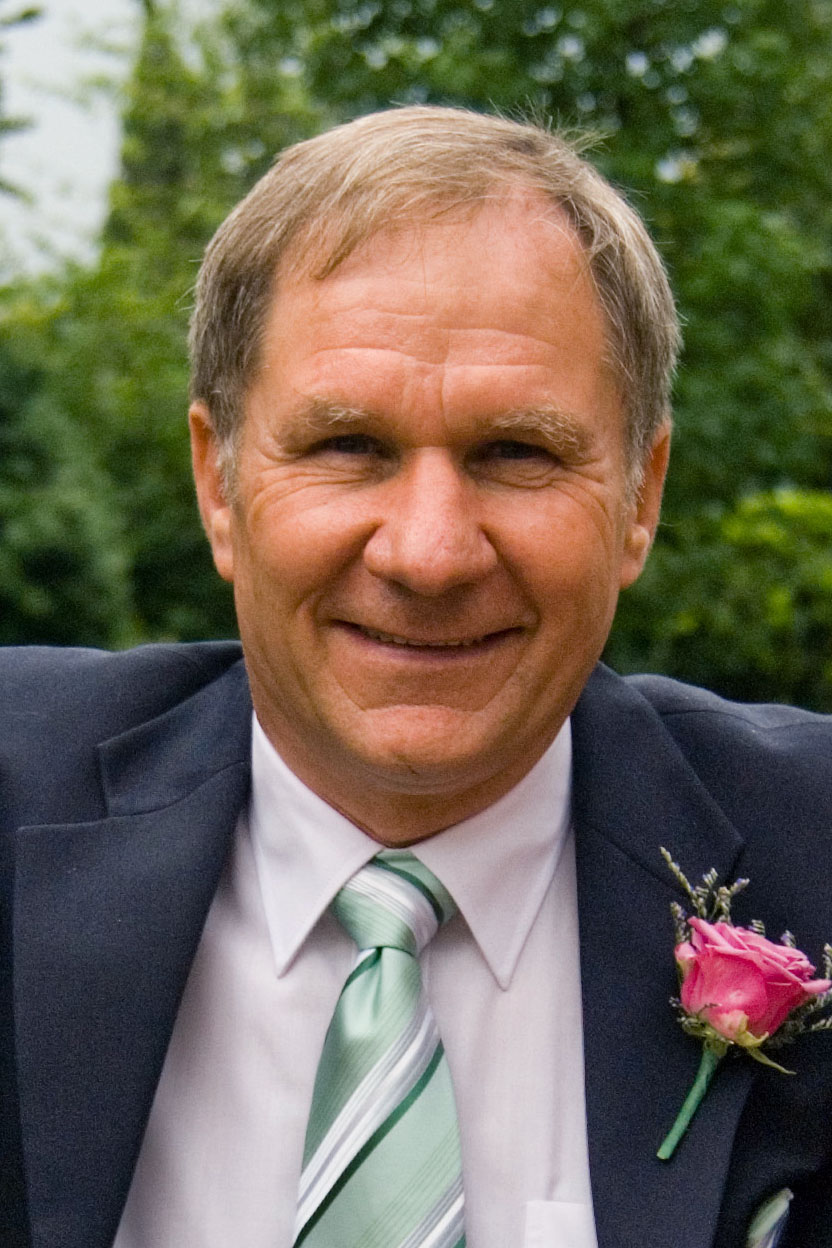
- Born: 23 May 1946; South Africa
- Died: 19 February 2019 (aged 72); Pretoria, South Africa
- Education: University of Pretoria, University of South Africa,
- Known for: Calcium Phosphate-based Bioceramics
- Scientific career
- Fields: Chemistry
- Workplaces: CSIR

Paul Wilhelm Richter (23 May 1946 – 18 February 2019) was a South African chemist and principal researcher involved in bioceramic research activities. He is most widely known for his development of the bioceramic hydroxyapatite orbital implant.

Richter completed his BSc degree studies in Chemistry at the University of Pretoria in 1967, followed by an MSc in chemistry in 1969. His PhD was obtained through the University of South Africa in 1971.

Richter worked as a research scientist at the CSIR in Pretoria, South Africa since 1970. His areas of involvement included solid-state chemistry (structure - property - processing - performance relationship), x-ray diffraction, high pressure phase studies, thermal analysis, magnetic materials, crystal growth, ferroelectricity, injection molding, rapid prototyping and ceramic processing.

In December 2019 a public memorial garden was created for Dr Richter in Mowbray, Cape Town.

== Major works ==
Richter's career in research and development in the field of ceramics, and more recently on Bioceramics for medical applications, culminated in the successful development and commercialism of the Eyeborn orbital implant. Eyeborn is a hydroxyapatite orbital implant used to replace the eyeball of a patient who has lost an eye. A prosthetic eye cap is fitted on the front of the Eyeborn implant, restoring the patient's appearance and improving his quality of life.

The key innovation for the implant is the ease with which it integrates with the eye socket tissue, giving the artificial eye natural movement. This product was launched and introduced to the eye specialist community during the annual international conference of the Ophthalmological Society of Southern Africa at Sun City in February 2004 and is being sold commercially in SA and abroad and has been recognized by international awards.

== Notable publications ==
- Aug-1999, "Macroporous hydroxyapatite bioceramics by solid freeform fabrication: towards custom implants" Richter, PW; Thomas, ME; Van Deventer, T
- Aug-1999, Novel combination of reverse engineering and vapid prototyping in medicine Schenker, R; De Beer, DJ; Du Preez, WB; Thomas, ME; Richter, PW
- Aug-1999, Macroporous synthetic hydroxyapatite bioceramics for bone substitute applications Thomas, ME; Richter, PW; Van Deventer, T; Crooks, J; Ripamonti, U
- Jul-2006, Eyeborn – restored quality of life for the visually impaired Du Preez, WB; Richter, PW; Hope, D; Kotze, CP
- Nov-2006, Product development lessons from the Eyeborn experience Du Preez, WB; Richter, PW; Hope, D
