= David Phetoe =

South African actor (1933-2018)

- Born: David Phetoe; 1933; South Africa
- Died: 31 January 2018 (aged 85); Johannesburg, South Africa
- Occupation: Actor
- Years active: 1959–2018
- Children: 2

David Phetoe (1933 – 31 January 2018) was a South African actor. He is best known for the lead role "Paul Moroka" in the soap opera Generations.

== Personal life ==
He had a brother, Molefe. He had two children including; Eugene.

He died on 31 January 2018 in Chris Hani Baragwanath Academic Hospital, Johannesburg, South Africa at the age of 85 after suffering from an undisclosed illness. The memorial service took place at the SABC studios in Johannesburg.

== Career ==
He started his career after joining with Dorkay House in Johannesburg. In 1959, he appeared in the play Nongogo produced by Athol Fugard. The show was performed at the Bantu Men’s Social Centre, but was later banned by the government. In 1979, he made his film debut with the feature Game for Vultures and played the role "Matambo". Since then he acted in many films of various genres such as; Dragonard, Tusks, Bush Shrink, Ipi Tombi and A Good Man in Africa. In 1993, he joined with the original cast of SABC1 soap opera Generations. In the soapie, he played the role "Paul Moroka" for many years.

In the meantime, he appeared in the South African-American blockbuster drama film Cry, The Beloved Country which was based on a novel. In the film, he played the critics acclaimed role "Black Priest". He later acted in the comedy sitcom Sgudi Snayisi and many serials such as; Velaphi, Going Up, and Imvelaphi. In 2007, he was honored with the Lifetime Achievement Award at the Naledi Theatre Awards.

== Filmography ==
Year	Film	Role	Genre	Ref.
1979	Game for Vultures	Matambo	Film	
1987	Master of Dragonard Hill	Isaac	Film	
1987	Dragonard	Isaac	Film	
1988	Tusks	Watson	Film	
1988	Blind Justice	Chipepo chief	Film	
1988	Diamond in the Rough	Connors' Thug	Film	
1988	Bush Shrink	Mukakwe	Film	
1990	The Fourth Reich	Petrol Attendant	Film	
1992	Lethal Ninja	African President	Film	
1993	Friends	Priest	Film	
1993	Generations	Paul Moroka	TV series	
1993	Drumbeats	Stan Themba	TV movie	
1994	Ipi Tombi	King	Film	
1994	A Good Man in Africa	Isaiah	Film	
1995	Cry, the Beloved Country	Black Priest	Film	
1997	The Principal	Reverend Mchunu	TV mini series	
1997	A Woman of Color	Zakes Mandla	TV movie	
