= Mandla Lamba =

South African fraudster and "fake billionaire"

- Born: South Africa
- Occupation: Fraudster
- Years active: 2010, 2021–present
- Known for: South Africa's "youngest billionaire", "fake billionaire"
- Criminal charges: Fraud, culpable homicide
- Criminal penalty: 10 years imprisonment (3 years suspended)
- Criminal status: Released

Mandla Lamba is a South African scammer, known for having acquired a fake reputation as the country's "youngest billionaire" and a successful mining tycoon before being exposed. He was arrested on fraud and homicide charges in May 2011 and was imprisoned before becoming active again in 2021 following his release from jail.

== Rise to notoriety ==
In 2010, South African media hailed Lamba as an inspirational example of young entrepreneurship and Black Economic Empowerment (BEE), based on his claims of having risen from underprivileged beginnings to become, at age 25, a wealthy businessman who owned gold, diamond and manganese mines in South Africa, Zambia and the Republic of the Congo. He was the executive chairman of East American Resources, a "mid-tier mining company" that he claimed was worth "billions". Lamba cultivated a public image of a successful businessman, living a lavish lifestyle and flaunting his supposed wealth by driving expensive sports cars, hiring three bodyguards and spending extravagant amounts of money at nightlife establishments.

Lamda's reputation began to be called into question after Investec Bank refuted claims by Lamba that he had been offered a directorship at the bank but had to decline because he was "too busy". This raised suspicions, and investigative journalists began looking into his background only to find that his life story, academic qualifications, and business dealings all lacked credibility. He was found to have operated an insurance and financial services company without a proper registration with the Financial Services Board; it sold final expenses insurance and offered debt consolidation services, but customers did not receive the services they paid for, and its employees were also owed wages. It was also discovered that Lamba was listed in a fraud database and had previously twice defaulted on debt.

It was found that Lamba was wanted by police for culpable homicide in relation to a 2007 traffic accident in Roodepoort that led to two deaths, having absconded from the criminal proceedings. He was also wanted on multiple charges of fraud – six in Gauteng, five in KwaZulu-Natal and one in Free State. In one instance, Lamba was alleged to have cheated multiple taxi drivers of R40,000 each by promising that he would help purchase new vehicles for them at lower prices; charges had been filed, but he fled "when the case was in its final stages".

Following the publication of the exposé in City Press on 7 November 2010, business partners of Lamba also came forward to accuse him of defrauding them, or lying about the nature of their dealings, such as misrepresenting preliminary negotiations as deals that had been completed, or were close to finalization. Lamba resigned from the chairmanship of East American Resources, but denied that this was connected to the allegations against him and the resulting negative publicity.

Lamba then gave an interview on 12 November 2010 with radio station SAfm in which he lambasted several journalists for "misquot[ing]" and "writ[ing] lies" about him, vehemently attacking and threatening the author of the exposé in particular. Lamba repeated prior allegations that there was a conspiracy by "former allies", "rivals and enemies" to "harass" and discredit him. In an unusual move, prominent businessman, politician and future President of South Africa Cyril Ramaphosa personally called the radio station to issue a public denial that neither he nor his wife, physician and businesswoman Tshepo Motsepe, had any connection with Lamba, refuting Lamba's previous claims that they had been his "mentors, counsellors and parental guiders".

== 2011 arrest ==
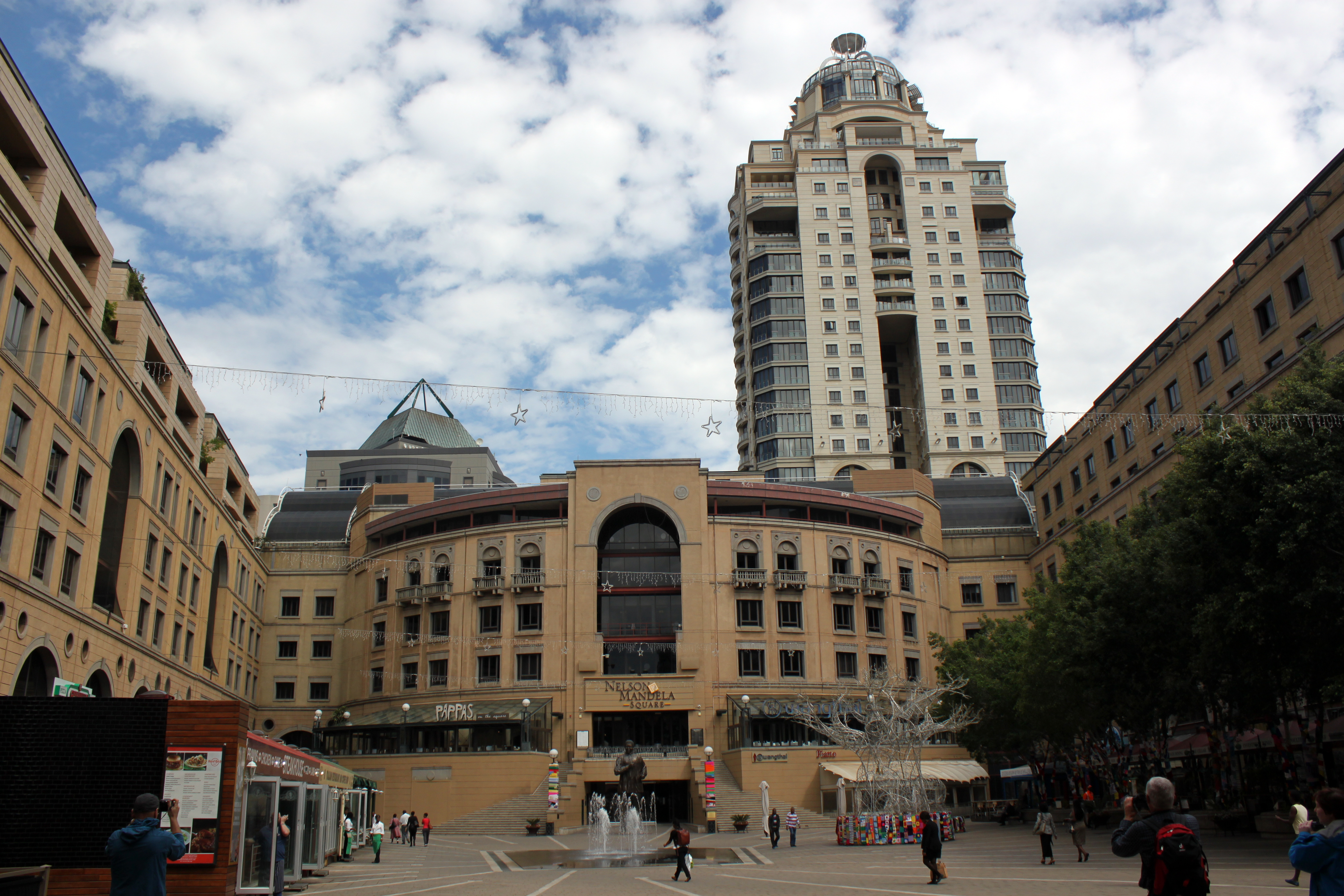
Nelson Mandela Square, the site of Lamba's arrest in May 2011

After several months of successfully evading the police, for which he was dubbed "BEE Houdini" by the press, Lamba was arrested in Nelson Mandela Square in Sandton, Johannesburg on 10 May 2011 on 15 charges of fraud and one of culpable homicide after police were tipped off about his location. It was reported that he had supported his fancy lifestyle with a "small fortune" made from "several fraudulent deals and online scams"; he also reportedly failed to pay the security company that provided his bodyguards.

Lamba had actually been caught by police several months earlier, when he was arrested together with three friends and his three bodyguards at Cresta Shopping Centre in Johannesburg, in October 2010, in relation to a chain of jewellery store robberies. They were released when this was found to be in error; police did not realize that Lamba was a wanted person as they had not taken his fingerprints. Lamba retained the services of high-profile lawyer Zola Majavu in relation to this case; Majavu secured the release of Lamba and his associates and the return of their confiscated mobile phones, also filing a R14 million lawsuit against the police for false arrest. Majavu quit his representation of Lamba upon the latter's arrest, citing R120,000 in unpaid fees.

Criminal proceedings against Lamba were repeatedly postponed to allow more time for further investigations to be conducted, as more allegations against him had surfaced following news of his arrest; there were eventually 23 charges against him. There were further delays when Lamba's attorney withdrew from the case, complaining that Lamba issued "contradictory instructions" each time they met.

Due to his history of absconding from criminal proceedings, Lamba was considered a flight risk and his legs were shackled for court appearances; his lawyer's petitions to have the leg irons removed were rejected. Likewise, in June 2011, Lamba was denied bail by the Orlando magistrate's court, as two residential addresses that he had provided in the bail application turned out to be occupied by other people when investigators visited. This decision was upheld in a May 2012 appeal to the Johannesburg High Court, which found that Lamba had lied in his bail application that there were no other cases pending against him, and that his lack of a fixed address posed an impediment to monitoring his movements. Furthermore, police from Roodepoort had stood by during bail hearings, ready to re-arrest Lamba immediately in the event that the Orlando court granted bail.

Lamba was convicted by the Roodepoort magistrate's court in July 2015 for culpable homicide and sentenced to 10 years in prison, three of which were suspended.

== 2021 return ==
Lamba resurfaced again in 2021 as the founder and chief executive officer (CEO) of Agilitee, purported to be an electric vehicle manufacturer.

On 2 July 2021, Lamba appeared in a broadcast on media personality Somizi Mhlongo's Instagram channel, where he showcased Agilitee and its upcoming products, one of which was "inspired by" and named after Mhlongo. Mhlongo's followers were offered "special" promotional prices on the company's shares; Lamba claimed that investors would receive shares worth ten times the amount that they paid for, with the shortfall covered by future dividends. Prospective investors were asked to make a bank transfer to a provided bank account number before submitting proof of payment via a WhatsApp message. When asked about reports that Mhlongo's viewers subsequently experienced difficulties when trying contacting Agilitee by email and telephone, Lamba suggested that they may have used an incorrect email address, and said that the company had 11 employees at its call centre. Meanwhile, in response to criticism for giving Lamba a platform, Mhlongo said that he "doesn't do due diligence on the companies that use him as an 'influencer'" and asserted that Lamba had been "rehabilitated" after serving his prison sentence and "deserved a second chance". The company also put out a statement in defence of Lamba, saying that its board was proud of his "ability to turn around a messy past to a great future".

Lamba also repeatedly made claims, both in the Instagram broadcast and elsewhere, to the effect that the banks Capitec and Absa were "in partnership" with the Agilitee venture. However, both banks refuted this when queried by journalists, denying that they had any business relationship with the company. Absa also said that Agilitee had been warned to cease and desist from using their brand in its marketing.

In another investment scheme that was also endorsed by Mhlongo, Lamba reportedly promised that members of the "Mandla Lamba Billionaires' Club" (MLBC) would be able to receive a "guaranteed" monthly income of R1 million, for an initial investment of just R150,000; some people who say they have fallen victim to this have sought help from the police. However, other MLBC members called this a mischaracterisation of the club, saying that the money paid was "merely membership fees and not investment capital". They claimed that the club was a non-profit organisation, but that its members are, according to their membership tier, eligible to earn a commission for selling "training materials" for Verityhurst Academy – another Lamba venture that teaches people "how to trade shares on the JSE".

In September 2021, South Africa's Financial Sector Conduct Authority (FSCA) issued warnings regarding Lamba and four of his ventures – Agilitee, MLBC, Verityhurst Academy, and private equity firm Verityhurst Capital – stating that they were not authorised by law to provide financial advice or intermediary services. The FSCA statement noted reports that they were "conducting an unregistered business and offering shares to members of the public on social media and other broadcasting platforms, promising them unrealistic returns" and urged "caution" in business dealings with Lamba.

Lamba responded by issuing a denial, stating that neither he nor the companies affiliated to him "provide any financial advice". According to his statement, Verityhurst Academy only offered training, and did not serve as an intermediary for trading shares; MLBC was a non-profit organisation that did not "sell any products to its members or the public", even though it "had offered shares to its members and investors were encouraged to buy shares". Lamba also clarified that he had left the position of CEO at Agilitee South Africa, having handed the post over to the Chief Operations Officer. However, he remained on the board of the company, and continued to serve as CEO of its parent company Agilitee Africa.
