= Rex Rabanye =

South African musician (1944–2010)

- Born: Michael Morake Rabanye; 13 March 1944; Potchefstroom, Union of South Africa
- Died: 10 October 2010 (aged 66); Potchefstroom, South Africa
- Occupations: Recording artist; Keyboardist; Producer; Music Arranger; Composer
- Years active: 1967–2010
- Spouse: Achu Rabanye
- Children: 3
- Musical career
- Genres: Jazz; Soulful pop; soul; Afro Jazz
- Instruments: Keyboard; guitar
- Label: Gallo Records

Michael Morake Rabanye (13 March 1944 – 10 October 2010), known professionally as Rex Rabanye, was a South African jazz, fusion and soulful pop musician.

== Early life ==
He was born in Potchefstroom. He studied under B Luris at North-West University. He learned to play the keyboards from his father, Samuel Rabanye at the age of fifteen.

== Career ==
To the south west of Johannesburg, Ikageng produced a soul band called the Teenage Lovers. Rabanye waswas Ikageng's response to Alexandra's Sankie Chounyane. His beehive organ sound earned him millions of fans around the country.

After going solo, Rex Rabanye released "O Nketsang" and "Moya Moya". Rabanye's paintings are exhibited on the walls of the African Methodist Church in Ikageng. In the late 80s he moved from to Mmabatho near Mafikeng, where he relaunched his musical career. His other albums include Somlandela, Campus Mood and Stop Nonsons.

In his later years his health deteriorated and he lost his hearing. During SAMA 12 he was honoured with a Lifetime Achievement award.

He was in a wheelchair receiving the award.

He was a founding member of the Teenage Lovers in the late 1960s. The band consisted of Rabanye (keyboardist), Dan Mangwele (guitarist), Toto Rabanye (bass), Boy (saxophonist) and Victor Masigo (drummer). Lawrence 'Sackey' Goreoang was a guitarist in the band and later joined a rival band (The Question Marks) that he founded. The Teenage Lovers made platinum hits such as "Botany 500", "Trinity", "Mmabatho", and "Potchefstroom Road". When the Teenage Lovers disbanded Rabanye went solo, he conceived platinum-selling albums including Onketsang (1986) and Moya Moya (1987). "Onketsang" remains a favourite song during African Weddings throughout South Africa and neighbouring countries.

== Personal life ==
He married Achu Rabanye and they had 1 son, 2 daughters.

== Death ==
He died on 10 October 2010 at his home in Potchefstroom after battling a lifelong illness.

== Recognition ==
Rex has received many awards in recognition for his contribution to the music industry, one being the South African Music Awards lifetime achievement award during the 2006 MTN SAMA's.

== Discography ==
=== Studio albums ===
- Moya-Moya (1986)
- O Nketsang (1986)
- Stôp Nônsôns (1986)
- Moya-Moya (1986)
- Somlandela (1987)
- Campus Mood (1988)
- There's Nothing For Mahala (2007)
