= Murder of Hannah Cornelius =

2017 murder in Stellenbosch, South Africa

- Date: May 27–28, 2017
- Time: 6 - 7:30 AM (SAST)
- Location: Stellenbosch, South Africa; 33°52′27.35″S 18°51′34.44″E
- Type: Gang rape, Murder, Robbery, Kidnapping
- Target: Hannah Cornelius, Cheslin Marsh, Ncumisa Qwina, Miemie Oktober
- Perpetrators: Nashville Julius, Geraldo Parsons, Eben Van Niekerk, Vernon Witbooi
- Deaths: 1 (Hannah Cornelius)
- Injuries: 1 (Cheslin Marsh)
- Charges: Murder, kidnapping, rape, robbery
- Trial: Cape Town high court
- Verdict: Guilty
- Sentence: Parsons, Niekerk and Witbooi: 2 life sentences plus 112 years imprisonment Julius: 22 years imprisonment

Hannah Cornelius was a 21-year-old white South African Stellenbosch University student. Hannah, along with her friend Cheslin Marsh, was abducted by a gang in Stellenbosch, South Africa, in May 2017, with Cornelius being viciously gang raped and murdered. Her body was found by two borehole pump technicians.

== Background ==
In the early hours of May 27, 2017, Hannah Cornelius had offered Cheslin Marsh a ride home after a night out with friends. While the pair were parked outside Marsh's residence, they were ambushed by four men. CCTV footage captured the moment the gang encircled their vehicle. Armed with weapons, they forced Cheslin into the backseat and then the trunk, while Hannah was restrained between the two front seats.

The attackers drove the car to a petrol station, attempting to withdraw money using Cheslin's bank card. When they were given an incorrect PIN, the gang drove to a remote area. There, Cheslin was beaten and attacked with bricks and abandoned, believed to be dead. He survived, albeit with significant injuries.

The men afterwards drove with Hannah to an acquaintance's drug den, forcing her to consume crystal meth and cannabis with them before again driving off with her. One of the suspects testified a condom was then produced and claimed that Hannah had agreed to have sex with the gang in return for her release. She was then taken to a closed paintball park where she was held down by force by the gang and another alleged perpetrator (who was not later apprehended) and repeatedly raped and sodomised in turns over and over for several hours. All suspects admitted to being high on the above mentioned drugs, which contributed to the prolonged and vicious nature of the assault. Evidence found at the crime scene included several used condoms with DNA matching the suspects, along with one of Hannah's earrings that had been torn off. Near dawn, they took her to Knorhoek farm road next to a vineyard. Prosecutors at trial allege the accused intended to further rape Cornelius at the vineyard since her body was found with her jeans pulled down to her knees. Autopsy testimony from the trial revealed she had suffered significant genital injury, along with grains of sand in her vagina, indicative of forced and repeated sexual assault, as well as severe bruising on her arms and legs caused by strong gripping while being held down on the ground. Semen was found on her clothing and body, while skin cell specimens obtained from Hannah's fingernails matched scratch marks from at least two of the accused suspects' faces, indicating she resisted their assault.. One of the accused men testified they had initially planned to release Hannah at the vineyard until she began to resist. She was then hauled from the trunk of the vehicle, stabbed in the neck, kicked and beaten into submission, and finally fatally injured when a large 82-pound rock (which had been used to cover a borehole) was lifted and dropped on Cornelius' head at least twice as she was held down.

Following the murder, the gang pursued further crimes, targeting and robbing two other women in Kraaifontein before eventually being apprehended after a police chase upon being spotted in Hannah's car. The additional victims were Ncumisa Qwina and Miemie Oktober, with the latter also being kidnapped and held against her will in the stolen vehicle before being released after her robbery.

The attackers were identified as Vernon Witbooi, 33, Geraldo Parsons, 27, Nashville Julius, 29, and Eben Van Niekerk, 28. Although three of them admitted to being present during the crime, they denied their involvement in the rape and murder. Witbooi was captured twice on CCTV cameras at different petrol stations attempting to withdraw money with stolen ATM cards: Marsh's (during which he was also seen wearing the victim's stolen warmer vest), and later that afternoon using one of the robbed women's bank cards in a successful withdrawal. By the time of the latter crime, Witbooi had changed clothing (notably, his pants were of a different colour). Forensic swabs taken from Parsons' scrotum shortly after his apprehension matched DNA from Cornelius. Parsons attempted to deflect blame for the rape on Witbooi yet admitted to raping Hannah twice. During cross examination he declined to elaborate on embedded pearls in his penile shaft which prosecution alleged was a significant factor in the trauma to her genitalia. Hannah's underwear was also alleged to have been taken as a trophy by one of the suspects and never recovered (or was presumed destroyed), as testimony from Parson's girlfriend revealed Van Niekerk burned his blood-stained clothing and shoes shortly before being apprehended.

== Aftermath ==
The four perpetrators were tried and sentenced in 2018, with a combined prison term of 358 years. Three of the four received life sentences.

The tragedy had profound effects on Hannah's family. Anna Cornelius, Hannah's mother, died in a swimming accident a year after her daughter's death. While her death was ruled as an accident, Hannah's father, Willem Cornelius, remarked that Anna might not have had the physical or mental strength to cope with the loss of their daughter.

To commemorate Hannah and channel their grief, Willem and Anna established the Hannah Cornelius Foundation, aiming to help local children access education and escape community violence.

Willem Cornelius was diagnosed with cancer roughly three months after his daughter's death. He succumbed to the illness on December 9, 2022.

The events leading up to Hannah's death were covered in a documentary released five years after the incident, shedding light on the tragedy.

== See also ==
- Gangrape
- Sexual violence in South Africa
- Murder of Anene Booysen
