= OpenForum =

- Begins: 22 May 2012
- Ends: 24 May 2012
- Frequency: Annual
- Locations: Cape Town International Convention Centre; Cape Town, South Africa
- Website: www.openforum.net

The OpenForum was a six-hundred-delegate, three-day conference held in the Cape Town International Convention Centre (CTICC) in Cape Town, South Africa, in May 2012. The aim of the OpenForum was to bring a variety of thought leaders and activists to discuss the inherent paradoxes of societal inequality in Africa focusing on the three interlinking areas of money, power and sex. The event was hosted by the four Open Society Africa Foundations, which are under the umbrella of George Soros's Open Society Foundations.

== Overview ==
Each day of the OpenForum was dedicated to one of the key themes of Money, Power or Sex. Though the themes are inextricably interlinked Day 1 focussed on Money, Day 2 on Power and Day 3 on Sex. The OpenForum included major plenary debates and high-powered discussions as well as numerous smaller sessions highlighting innovative ideas and approaches.
