= List of programmes broadcast by RTÉ One =

The following is a partial list of broadcasts aired on RTÉ One, formerly known as Telefís Éireann, RTÉ and RTÉ 1 (Ireland's first television channel) from its launch in 1961. A list of broadcasts on its (later) sister channel may be found elsewhere.

== Home-produced programming ==
=== Current ===
- Nine O'Clock News (1961–present)
- Six One News (1962–present)
- One O'Clock News (1989–present)
- The Late Late Show (1962–present)
- Fair City (1989–present)
- Would You Believe (1990s–present)
- Prime Time (1992–present)
- Nationwide (1993–present)
- Nuacht (1995–present)
- Reeling in the Years (1999–present)
- The Week in Politics (2006–present)
- At Your Service (2008–present)
- Mrs. Brown's Boys (2011–present)
- The Traitors Ireland (2025–present)

=== Former ===
==== Young people's programming ====
- Action Station Saturday
- Aillio
- An Baile Beag
- Anything Goes
- Aunty Poppy's Storytime
- Bábaró
- Bishop Fulton Sheen
- Borderline
- Bosco
- Bosco: The Animated Series
- Brogeen Follows the Magic Tune
- Buntús Cainte
- C-P & Qwikstitch
- Dáithí Lacha
- Dempsey's Den
- Deep Fried Swamp
- Dilín Ó Deamhas
- Fortycoats & Co.
- Jump Around
- Look Around
- The Morbegs
- Murphy agus a Cháirde
- Newsline
- Out on Your Own
- Paint for Fun
- Pajo's Junkbox
- Pat's Chat
- Pat's Hat
- Pat's Pals
- Scratch Saturday
- Seoirse agus Beartlai
- Ten Minute Tales (1988-1989)
- TV Gaga
- Video Time
- Wanderly Wagon
- Youngline
- Zoo Logic

==== 0–9 ====
- 7 Days
- 30 Years A-Glowing
- 100 Years
- 50,000 Secret Journeys

==== A ====
- A hAon is a hAon Sin a hAon
- A. J. F. O'Reilly: An Irish Lion
- Access - Community Television
- Act of Betrayal
- The Adam Faith Show
- Ag Déanamh Ceoil
- Airc
- Aiséirí
- Aisling Gheal
- Alert
- …and finally France
- Amuigh Faoin Spéir
- An Fear agus a Chuid Ceoil
- The Angelus
- Anissimov Conducts Beethoven
- Anois is Arís
- Anthology
- Aria with Thirty Variations: The Goldberg Variations
- Art Attacks
- As the Crow Flies
- As Zozimus Said
- At the Embankment
- Atty Bunting

==== B ====
- Ballad Sheet
- A Ballad Tour of Ireland
- The Ballroom of Romance
- Ballymagash
- Barry Mason, Songwriter
- Be My Guest
- Beirt Eile
- Bestseller
- The Big Top
- Billy Boyle in Magical Christmas Tour
- Billy's Magic Christmas Box
- The Birthday Show
- Blas na Fraince
- The Blue Note
- Bóithrín na Smaointe
- Booklines
- Borderlines
- Bracken
- Brandy Snap
- Bring Down the Lamp
- Broadsheet
- Bull Island
- By Meadow and Mountain/Mountain and Meadow

==== C ====
- Cabin Fever
- Caught in a Free State
- Challenging Times
- Check Up
- Closedown
- Coiscéim
- Comely Maidens

==== D ====
- Discovery

==== E ====
- Ear to the Ground
- Exhibit A

==== F ====
- The Fall
- Farrell
- Féach
- The Fenians
- Folio
- For Better, For Worse
- For Better Or Worse
- For One Night Only
- Framed!

==== G ====
- Garda Patrol
- The Garden
- The Gay Byrne Music Show
- Glenroe
- Good Afternoon
- Greenfingers

==== H ====
- Hall's Pictorial Weekly
- Hands
- Hands On
- The Hanging Gale
- Hanly's People
- Haughey
- Head 2 Toe
- Hidden History
- The Humours of Donnybrook

==== I ====
- In Search of the Pope's Children
- Insurrection
- Ireland's Generation Game
- Irish Railways

==== J ====
- Jackpot

==== K ====
- Know Your Sport

==== L ====
- Labhair Gaeilge Linn
- Leader's Questions
- Léargas
- Legal Eagles
- Lifting the Veil – The Politics of Television
- Live at 3
- Love Is

==== M ====
- Mailbag
- Mart and Market
- Mass
- The Meaning of Life
- Messiah
- Millennium Eve: Celebrate 2000
- The Mountain Lark
- Murphy's Micro-Quiz-M

==== N ====
- Newsbeat
- No Comment
- Nodlaig McCarthy with...
- Notice to Quit

==== O ====
- Oireachtas Report
- On The Street Where You Live
- One to One
- Out of the Blue
- Outlook
- Out of Nowhere

==== P ====
- Pattern's
- Paper Chase
- The Person in Question
- The Politicians
- The Politics Programme
- A Prayer at Bedtime
- Prime Time Investigates
- Public Account
- Public Enemy

==== Q ====
- Questions and Answers

==== R ====
- Radharc
- Rapid Roulette
- Read Write Now
- The Riordans
- Room Outside

==== S ====
- Scannal!
- School Around the Corner
- Secret Sights
- A Sense of Excellence
- Seven Ages
- Simply Music
- The Spike
- The State of Us
- Strumpet City
- Súil Thart

==== T ====
- Tales of Kilnavarna
- Tangents
- Today Tonight
- Tolka Row
- To the Waters and the Wild
- The Tony Kenny Show
- Top Ace '82
- Townlands
- Tracks and Trails
- Treasure Island
- The Treaty
- Trom agus Éadrom
- True Lives
- Tuesday File
- Turas Teanga
- TV50

==== U ====
- Up and Running
- Up for the Match

==== V ====
- Video File
- The View

==== W ====
- Waterways
- What's My Line
- When Reason Sleeps
- Whistleblower
- Word in Action
- Why?

==== Y ====
- The Year of the French

==== Z ====
- The Zoo
- Zero Science/Technology magazine

== Imported ==
=== Current ===
Telefís Éireann airs a small selection of imports, mostly sitcom repeats, soap operas and other dramas. These include:

- Doctors
- EastEnders (since 2001)
- Keeping Up Appearances
- Last of the Summer Wine
- Mr. Bean
- Mr. Mercedes
- Neighbours
- Shortland Street (since 1996)

=== Former ===
Telefís Éireann has aired:

- 1915
- The 20th Century
- The 7th Heaven
- 8 Simple Rules
- 'Allo 'Allo!
- The A-Team
- Absolutely Fabulous
- Ace Crawford, Private Eye
- The Adventurer
- The Adventures of Brisco County, Jr.
- The Adventures of Robin Hood
- The Adventures of the Black Stallion
- Agatha Christie's Partners in Crime
- Agatha Christie's Poirot
- After Henry
- ALF
- Alias Smith and Jones
- All Creatures Great and Small
- All the Green Year
- Alfred Hitchcock Presents
- Almost Perfect
- Aly Bain and Friends
- Amazing Stories
- Ancient Warriors
- Are You Being Served?
- Ark on the Move
- Around the World in 80 Days (1989 miniseries)
- The Ascent of Man
- At Last the 1948 Show
- Australia Wild
- A.J. Wentworth, B.A.
- Bailey's Bird
- Bakersfield P.D.
- Ballykissangel
- Barbary Coast
- Barnaby Jones
- Batman
- Baywatch
- Baywatch Hawaii
- The Beachcombers
- Bearcats!
- The Beatles Anthology
- The Beiderbecke Connection
- Benji's Very Own Christmas Story
- The Benny Hill Show
- Benson
- The Beverly Hillbillies
- Bewitched
- Beyond 2000
- The Big Pull
- Big Sky
- The Big Valley
- The Bionic Woman
- Bit of a Do
- The Black Forest Clinic
- Bless Me, Father
- Blood and Honor: Youth Under Hitler
- Blue Heelers
- Bonanza
- Boon
- Born Free
- The Brady Bunch
- Brat Farrar
- Brideshead Revisited
- Bring 'Em Back Alive
- The Brittas Empire
- Brooklyn South
- The Brothers
- Burke's Law (1994 series)
- Buongiorno Italia
- B.J. and the Bear
- Cagney and Lacey
- The Campbells
- Campion
- Cannon
- Carson's Law
- The Cavanaughs
- The Cedar Tree
- Charlie Chaplin
- Charlie's Angels (1976 series)
- The Charmer
- Cheers
- The Cheryl Ladd Special
- The Cheryl Ladd Special: Souvenirs
- China Beach
- CHiPs
- Christmas Lilies of the Field
- The Cinder Path
- Coach
- Code R
- Cody
- The Colbys
- Columbo
- The Commish
- The Computer Programme
- Consuming Passions
- Coronation Street (1961–2001)
- The Cosby Show
- Country G.P.
- A Country Practice
- Cowboy in Africa
- Cracker
- Crayon Shin-chan
- Dad's Army
- Daktari
- Dallas (1978 series)
- Danger Bay
- Daniel Boone
- The Danny Kaye Show
- Darkroom
- Darling Buds of May
- The Day of the Triffids (1981 series)
- The Days and Nights of Molly Dodd
- Deadly Harvest
- Death Valley Days
- Degrees of Error
- Delia Smith's Cookery Course
- Dellaventura
- Dennis the Menace (1959 series)
- Designing Women
- Diagnosis: Murder
- The Dick Emery Show
- The Dick Van Dyke Show
- The Dirtwater Dynasty
- The Disney Hour
- Disneyland
- The Donna Reed Show
- Double Trouble
- Dr. Finlay's Casebook
- Dr Quinn, Medicine Woman
- The Drew Carey Show
- The Dukes of Hazzard
- The Dunera Boys
- Dynasty
- Edge of Darkness
- Emmerdale Farm
- Emily of New Moon
- The Equalizer
- ER
- Ever Decreasing Circles
- The Everglades
- Executive Stress
- Everybody Loves Raymond
- F Troop
- Falcon Crest
- The Fall and Rise of Reginald Perrin
- Fame
- The Fall Guy
- A Family at War
- Family Matters
- Family Ties
- The Famous Teddy Z
- The Fantastic Journey
- Farmhouse Kitchen
- Father Brown
- Father, Dear Father
- Father Dowling Mysteries
- Father Knows Best
- Fawlty Towers
- Ffizz
- The Fifth Missile
- The Flame Trees of Thika
- The Flight of the Heron
- The Flintstones
- Flipper (1964 series)
- The Flip Wilson Show
- Floyd on Fish
- The Flying Doctors
- Flying Plutonium
- Follow Me
- Forever Green
- The Forsyte Saga
- Fortune Hunter
- Frasier
- Fresh Fields
- The Fresh Prince of Bel-Air
- Full Circle with Michael Palin
- Funny Man
- The Gangster Chronicles
- Gardeners' Diary
- Gemini Man
- George and Leo
- George and Mildred
- George
- Get Smart
- Gloss
- The Golden Girls
- The Golden Palace
- Gone to Texas
- The Goodies
- The Good Life (1971 series)
- The Good Life (1975 series)
- The Great Escape II: The Untold Story
- Great Expectations (1981 series)
- Great Railway Journeys
- The Greatest American Hero
- Greatest Heroes of the Bible
- Green Acres
- Gunsmoke
- G.P.
- Hannay
- Happy Days
- Happy Ever After
- Harbourmaster
- The Hardy Boys/Nancy Drew Mysteries
- Harry and the Hendersons
- Hart to Hart
- Hawaii Five-0 (1968 series)
- Head of the Class
- Heartbeat (British version)
- The Henderson Kids
- Here's Lucy
- Highway to Heaven
- The Hill of the Red Fox
- Hill Street Blues
- The Hitchhiker
- The Hogan Family
- Hold the Back Page
- Hollywood
- Home Improvement
- Home to Roost
- Honey, I Shrunk the Kids: The TV Show
- The Honeymooners
- Hooperman
- Hoover vs. The Kennedys
- Hotel
- House of Carabus
- The House of Eliott
- Huckleberry Finn and His Friends
- I Dream of Jeannie
- I Spy
- The Incredible Hulk (1978 series)
- Inside China
- Inside Japan
- The Invisible Man
- In Search of...
- In the Heat of the Night
- The Irish R.M.
- Iron Horse
- It Takes a Thief
- Italianissimo
- Jack & Jill
- Jack and Mike
- The Jack Benny Show
- JAG
- Jake and the Fatman
- Jeeves and Wooster
- J.J. Starbuck
- Kate and Allie
- Katts and Dog
- Keeping Up Appearances
- Knight Rider
- Knots Landing
- Kojak
- Kontakte
- Ladykillers
- Land of the Giants
- Law & Order
- The Life and Times of Grizzly Adams
- Life Begins at Forty
- Life Goes On
- Lillie
- A Little Silver Trumpet
- Little House on the Prairie
- Logan's Run
- Lois and Clark: The New Adventures of Superman
- The London Embassy
- The Long White Trail
- Lost in Space
- Lou Grant
- Lovejoy
- The Love Boat
- Love Hurts
- Love on a Branch Line
- The Lucy Show
- Ludwig van Beethoven
- L.A. Law
- MacGyver
- The Mackenzie Affair
- Mad About You
- The Magician
- Maigret (1992 series)
- Major Dad
- Magnum, P.I.
- Man from Atlantis
- The Man from U.N.C.L.E.
- The Manhunter
- Mancuso, F.B.I.
- Mannix
- Mapp and Lucia
- Marcus Welby, M.D.
- The Martian Chronicles
- Mastermind
- Match of the Day
- Matlock
- Matt Houston
- Maya
- May to December
- McClain's Law
- The Men Who Killed Kennedy
- Miami Vice
- Michael Ball
- Midnight Caller
- Midsomer Murders
- Million Dollar Babies
- Mission: Impossible (1966 series)
- Mission: Impossible (1988 series)
- The Mississippi
- The Monkees
- Monsters
- The Monte Carlo Show
- Moonlighting
- The Morecambe & Wise Show
- Mork and Mindy
- The Mothers-in-Law
- Mr. Bean
- Mr. Belvedere
- Mr. Deeds Goes to Town
- The Muppet Show
- Murder, She Wrote
- Murphy Brown
- Music City USA
- My Cousin Rachel
- My Friend Flicka
- My Life and Times
- My Wife Next Door
- My World and Welcome to It
- M*A*S*H
- The Nancy Drew/Hardy Boys Mysteries
- Paint Along with Nancy Kominsky
- The Nanny
- The Nature of Things
- Ned and Stacey
- Nero Wolfe (1981 series)
- Never the Twain
- The New Adventures of Robin Hood
- The New Avengers
- The New Dick Van Dyke Show
- Nightmare Cafe
- The Nightmare Years
- North and South
- Nothing Scared
- Nobody's Perfect
- N.Y.P.D. Blue
- The Odd Couple
- Oh Happy Band!
- The Onedin Line
- One by One
- One Foot in the Grave
- Only Fools and Horses
- Opportunity Knocks
- The Oprah Winfrey Show
- The Oregon Trail
- Our Gang
- Our House
- Our John Willie
- Our Mutual Friend
- The Outcasts
- The Over-the-Hill Gang
- The Pallisers
- The Paper Moon
- Paradise
- Perfect Scoundrels
- Perry Mason
- The Persuaders!
- Petrocelli
- The Phil Silvers Show
- Playing Shakespeare
- Poldark
- Police Squad!
- The Politician's Wife
- Pottery Ladies
- The Power and the Glory
- The Powers of Matthew Star
- The Practice
- Pride and Prejudice (1980 series)
- The Prisoner
- The Prisoner of Zenda
- Quirke
- Q.E.D.
- Rangi's Catch
- Rags to Riches
- The Ray Bradbury Theatre
- Reasonable Doubts
- Reckless
- Red Fox
- Remington Steele
- Rich Man, Poor Man
- Rings on Their Fingers
- Rising Damp
- Riverboat
- The River Kings
- The Road West
- Robin of Sherwood
- RoboCop: The Series
- The Rockford Files
- The Rolf Harris Show
- Room for Two
- Rowan & Martin's Laugh-In
- Rude Health
- Rumpole of the Bailey
- Run, Buddy, Run
- Rush
- Ruth Rendell Mysteries
- The Saint
- Sale of the Century (British version)
- Salvage 1
- Sam
- Santa Barbara
- Sapphire and Steel
- Savannah
- Scruples
- Sea Hunt
- SeaQuest DSV
- Second Thoughts
- The Secret Life of Machines
- Scarecrow and Mrs. King
- Scene of the Crime
- The Sculptress
- Shadow Chasers
- Shannon's Deal
- Shine on Harvey Moon
- Sierra
- Simon & Simon
- The Simpsons
- The Six Million Dollar Man
- The Slap Maxwell Story
- Small Sacrifices
- Snowy River: The McGregor Saga
- Some Mothers Do 'Ave 'Em
- Sons and Daughters
- The Sopranos
- South Riding
- Space: Above and Beyond
- Space Precinct
- Spenser: For Hire
- Spin City
- Star Trek: The Next Generation
- Stingers
- Stingray (1985 series)
- Street Legal
- St. Elsewhere
- The Sullivans
- Supertrain
- Surgical Spirit
- The Sweeney
- Sweet Justice
- Swiss Family Robinson (1974 series)
- Sword of Honour
- Taggart
- Take Six Cooks
- Take the High Road
- A Tale of Two Cities
- Tales from the Dark Side
- Tales of the Unexpected
- Tammy
- Tarzan
- Taxi
- Technical Studies
- Tenko
- Terry and June
- Testament to the Bushmen
- The Thin Blue Line
- Thunder Alley
- Tiger on the Tiles
- Tinker Tailor Soldier Spy
- Tomorrow's World
- Touched By an Angel
- A Touch of Frost
- To Serve Them All My Days
- To the Manor Born
- Top Club
- Tracey Takes On...
- Traffik
- Twin Peaks
- Two's Company
- The Undersea World of Jacques Cousteau
- Under Suspicion
- Upstairs, Downstairs
- Valerie
- The Van Dyke Show
- Veronica's Closet
- The Vicar of Dibley
- The Victorian Kitchen Garden
- A Vous La France
- Voyage to the Bottom of the Sea
- Wait Till Your Father Gets Home
- The Waltons
- Wanted Dead or Alive
- The Whiteoaks of Jalna
- Who's the Boss?
- Wildlife on One
- Winnetka Road
- Wings
- Wish Me Luck
- Wojeck
- Wolf to the Slaughter
- A Woman Named Jackie
- Women of the Sun
- The Wonder Years
- The Wonderful World of Disney
- Xena: Warrior Princess
- Yan Can Cook
- Yellowthread Street
- The Yellow Rose
- Yes, Prime Minister
- The Young Indiana Jones Chronicles
- Young Ramsay
- The Young Riders
- Zoya

=== Young children's programming ===
- The 13 Ghosts of Scooby-Doo
- 3-2-1 Contact
- The Adventure Machine
- The Adventures of Babar
- The Adventures of Black Beauty
- The Adventures of Paddington Bear
- The Adventures of Raggedy Ann and Andy
- The Adventures of Robinson Crusoe
- The Adventures of Skippy
- The Adventures of Teddy Ruxpin
- The Adventures of the Black Stallion
- The Adventures of Rin Tin Tin
- The Adventures of the Terrible Ten
- The Adventures of Tintin
- The Abbott and Costello Cartoon Show
- Action Man (1995 series)
- Aladdin
- Alias the Jester
- All Change
- All the Green Year
- The All-New Popeye Show
- Alvin and the Chipmunks
- Andy Robson
- Animaland
- Animals, Animals, Animals
- The Animals of Farthing Wood
- Around the World with Willy Fog
- Arthur! and the Square Knights of the Round Table
- Augie Doggie and Doggie Daddy
- Babar
- Babar and Father Christmas
- The Baby's Storybook
- Bailey's Bird
- Bananas in Pyjamas
- Barbapapa
- The Barkleys
- Barney
- Barney & Friends
- Batman: The Animated Series
- The Battle of Billy's Pond
- Battle of the Planets
- Bay City
- Bear in the Big Blue House
- Beau Geste
- Belle and Sebastian
- Ben & Holly's Little Kingdom
- Benji, Zax & the Alien Prince
- The Berenstain Bears
- Bertie the Bat
- Bill and Ben
- Bill and Bunny
- The Biz
- Blue Peter Special Assignment
- Bobobobs
- Bolek and Lolek
- Bonkers
- The Box of Delights
- Boy Dominic
- Bozo the Clown
- Brendon Chase
- Bright Sparks
- The Bubblies
- Buford and the Galloping Ghost
- Bugs Bunny
- The Bugs Bunny Show
- A Bunch of Munsch
- The Busy World of Richard Scarry
- Butterfly Island
- The Cabbage Patch Kids' First Christmas
- Cadillacs and Dinosaurs
- Cardcaptors
- Care Bears
- The Cares of the Shore Patrol
- Cattanooga Cats
- Catweazle
- Casper and Friends
- Casper and the Angels
- The CB Bears
- Charlie Chalk
- Children of Fire Mountain
- Children of the New Forest
- Children of the Stones
- Children's Island
- The Chinese Word for Horse
- Chip 'n Dale: Rescue Rangers
- Chocky's Challenge
- Christmas Eve on Sesame Street
- The Chronicles of Narnia
- Circus Friends
- Classical Disney Cartoons
- The Clifton House Mystery
- Clue Club
- Cockleshell Bay
- Coconuts
- Codename Icarus
- Come Midnight Monday
- The Coral Island
- Coral World
- Count Duckula
- The Count of Monte Cristo
- The Country Mouse and the City Mouse Adventures
- Curious George (original series)
- Cyrano
- Dai Mouse to the Rescue
- Danger Mouse (1981 series)
- Dastardly and Muttley in Their Flying Machines
- Defenders of the Earth
- Dennis the Menace and Gnasher
- Deputy Dawg
- Detective Bogey
- The Devil and Daniel Mouse
- Dinky Dog
- Disney's Adventures of the Gummi Bears
- Doctor Dolittle
- Dog and Cat
- Dog City
- Dogtanian and the Three Muskehounds
- Dominic
- The Doombolt Chase
- Doug
- Drama 7
- Dramarama
- Droopy Dog
- DuckTales (Original series)
- The Eagle of the Ninth
- The Edison Twins
- Edward and Friends
- The Electric Company
- The Elephant Show
- Emma and Grandpa
- Enchanted Tales
- Eureka
- European Fairy Tales
- European Folk Tales
- Fables of the Green Forest
- Falcon Island
- Family Dog
- Faerie Tale Theatre
- The Famous Five (1978 series)
- The Famous Five (1995 series)
- Father Christmas
- Felix the Cat
- The Fenouillard Family
- Festival of Family Classics
- Fievel's American Tails
- Fifi and the Flowertots
- Fireman Sam
- Filopat and Patafil
- The Flintstone Kids
- The Flockton Flyer
- The Flying Kiwi
- Follow Me (1977 series)
- Follyfoot
- Foo Foo
- Forest Friends
- The Four
- Fraggle Rock
- Freewheelers
- Frosty's Winter Wonderland
- Fudge
- The Funky Phantom
- The Further Adventures of SuperTed
- Galtar and the Golden Lance
- Garfield and Friends
- Garfield in the Rough
- The Gemini Factor
- Gentle Ben
- George of the Jungle
- George Shrinks
- The Ghost Busters
- The Ghost of Monk's Island
- The Ghosts of Motley Hall
- The Girl from Tomorrow
- The Girl from Tomorrow Part II: Tomorrow's End
- Goof Troop
- The Great Grape Ape
- Gumby
- Habatales
- Hannibal's Footsteps
- Hattytown Tales
- Happy Birthday
- The Haunted School
- The Haunting of Cassie Palmer
- Haydaze
- Heathcliff and Dingbat
- Heathcliff and Marmaduke
- Heckle and Jeckle
- Heidi
- Help!... It's the Hair Bear Bunch!
- Henry's Leg
- Here Come the Double Deckers
- Here Comes Mumfie
- He-Man & She-Ra: A Christmas Special
- Hi-5
- Hogg's Back
- Hong Kong Phooey
- The Hostages
- The Houndcats
- How Do You Do
- How
- Hoze Houndz
- Huckleberry Hound
- Hunter's Gold
- H.R. Pufnstuf
- I am Weasel
- Inch High, Private Eye
- Into the Labyrinth
- Jabberjaw
- Jackanory Playhouse
- James Bond Jr.
- Jana of the Jungle
- Jennifer's Journey
- Jeremy the Bear
- The Jetsons
- Jockey School
- Jumbo Spencer
- Just William (1977 series)
- Kaboodle
- Karelian Tales
- Kipper
- The Kwicky Koala Show
- Lassie
- Lassie's Rescue Rangers
- The Legend of Tarzan
- The Legends of Treasure Island
- Leon the Fox
- Little Bear
- The Little Drummer Boy
- Little Lord Fauntleroy (1976 series)
- A Little Princess
- The Little Rascals
- Little Zoo
- The Littlest Hobo
- The Lone Ranger (1980 series)
- Loopy De Loop
- The Lost Islands
- Ludwig
- The Magic Boomerang
- Magic Mike Tales
- The Magic of Herself the Elf
- The Magic Roundabout
- Magilla Gorilla
- Magpie
- Make Way for Noddy
- Matt and Jenny
- Max and Moritz
- Maya the Bee
- Midnight is a Place
- Mighty Mouse
- Mighty Mouse and Friends
- Mike and Angelo
- Mike, Lu & Og
- The Minikins
- Mirror, Mirror
- The Moonkys
- Mopatop's Shop
- Mort and Phil
- Mr. Men
- Mr. T
- Muppet Babies
- The Nargun and the Stars
- NASCAR Racers
- Nature Watch
- Nellie the Elephant
- Nestor, the Long-Eared Christmas Donkey
- The New Adventures of Black Beauty
- The New Adventures of Mighty Mouse and Heckle & Jeckle
- The New Pink Panther Show
- The New Woody Woodpecker Show
- The New Shmoo
- Nilus the Sandman: The Boy Who Dreamed Christmas
- Noah's Island
- Nobody's House
- Noddy
- Noggin the Nog
- Ocean Girl
- The Odyssey
- Oggy and the Cockroaches
- Oliver Twist
- Once Upon a Time
- Once Upon a Time... Life
- Ovide Video
- Paddington
- Paint Along with Nancy
- Pandamonium
- Papa Beaver's Storytime
- The Paper Lads
- Park Ranger
- The Patchwork Hero
- Paw Paws
- Pecola
- Peppa Pig
- Pepper Ann
- Percy the Park Keeper
- The Perils of Penelope Pitstop
- Peter and the Magic Egg
- Peter Pan (1976 musical)
- The Phoenix and the Carpet
- The Pied Piper of Hamelin
- The Pink Panther
- Pink Panther and Pals
- The Pink Panther Show
- The Pink Panther in: A Pink Christmas
- Pip the Appleseed Knight
- Pixie and Dixie and Mr. Jinks
- Popeye
- Postman Pat and the Barometer
- Postman Pat and the Tuba
- The Powerpuff Girls
- Prince Cinders
- Professor Moffett's Science Workshop
- A Pup Named Scooby-Doo
- The Puppy's Further Adventures
- The Puppy's Great Adventure
- The Puppy's New Adventures
- Quack Pack
- Quaq Quao
- Quick Draw McGraw
- The Raccoons
- Raggedy Ann and Andy in The Great Santa Claus Caper
- The Real Ghostbusters
- The Real Story of...
- The Red and the Blue
- Redwall
- Return of the Antelope
- Revolting Rhymes
- Ric the Raven
- Ritter's Cove
- The Road Runner Show
- Road to Avonlea
- Robotman & Friends
- Rocket Power
- Rockschool
- Rocky Hollow
- The Roman Holidays
- Round the Bend
- The Rovers
- Rudolph the Red-Nosed Reindeer
- Rugrats
- Rupert
- Rupert Bear, Follow the Magic...
- Runaway Ralph
- Sabrina: The Animated Series
- Santa's Christmas Snooze
- Satellite City
- Saturdee
- Sea Urchins
- The Secret Garden (TV series)
- The Secret Garden (1987 film)
- Secret Squirrel
- The Secret World of Polly Flint
- Sesame Street
- Seven Little Australians
- Scooby-Doo
- Scooby-Doo, Where Are You!
- Scooby and Scrappy-Doo
- Scooby, Scrappy and Yabba-Doo
- Scooby Goes Hollywood
- Scooby's All-Star Laff-A-Lympics
- Sheep in the Big City
- Shingalana the Little Hunter
- Shirt Tales
- The Shoe People
- The Silver Chair
- Simon and the Witch
- Skippy the Bush Kangaroo
- Sky Pirates
- The Smoggies
- The Smurfs
- Snacker
- Snorks
- The Snowman
- Space Ghost and Dino Boy
- Space Stars
- Spider-Man
- Spider-Woman
- Sport Billy
- Stig of the Dump
- Stingray (1964 series)
- Storybook International
- Story Beneath the Sands
- The Story of the Dancing Frog
- Strawberry Shortcake in Big Apple City
- Supergran
- SuperTed
- Super Chicken
- Swallows and Amazons Forever!
- The Swiss Family Robinson (1975 series)
- T-Bag
- Take Hart
- Take Off
- Tales of the Riverbank
- Tarzan and the Super 7
- Tarzan, Lord of the Jungle
- Teenage Mutant Hero Turtles
- Teletubbies
- Tex Avery Cartoons
- Thunderbirds
- The Tiger and the Cat
- Timothy Goes to School
- Tiny Toon Adventures
- The Tiny Tree
- Tom and Jerry
- Tom & Jerry Kids
- Tom's Midnight Garden
- The Tomorrow People (1992 series)
- Top Cat
- Tots TV
- Touché Turtle and Dum Dum
- Travellers by Night
- Treasure Island
- Tweenies
- Ulysses 31
- The Unbroken Arrow
- Under the Mountain
- The Untamed World
- The Untouchables of Elliot Mouse
- Valley of the Dinosaurs
- Vision On
- The Voyage of the Mimi
- The Voyages of Doctor Dolittle
- Walt Disney's Mickey and Donald
- Wait Till Your Father Gets Home
- Watch Mr. Wizard
- We All Have Tales
- The Web
- The White Stone
- Widget
- Wild, Wild World of Animals
- Wildvision
- The Wind in the Willows
- Wizbit
- The Wombles (1973 series)
- The Wonderful World of Strawberry Shortcake
- Woody Woodpecker
- The Woody Woodpecker Show
- The World of David the Gnome
- The World of Jules Vernue
- The World of Strawberry Shortcake
- Worzel Gummidge
- The Wuzzles
- X-Men
- Yogi Bear
- Yogi Bear's All Star Comedy Christmas Caper
- Yogi's Treasure Hunt
- Zoom the White Dolphin

== Special events ==
- Ardfheis – The Leader's Speech
- Budget coverage
- Election coverage
- Eurovision Song Contest and National Song Contest
- FIFA World Cup (some coverage)
- Olympic Games (some coverage)
- People in Need Telethon
- The Rose of Tralee
- State funerals
- State visits
- The Late Late Toy Show
- Annual Christmas Nativity Plays
- Annual Passion Plays
- Urbi et Orbi
- Dublin's Saint Patrick's Day Parade
- Christmas, Easter and Saint Patrick's Day Mass
