= Namibian Broadcasting Corporation =

Public TV and radio broadcasting corporation

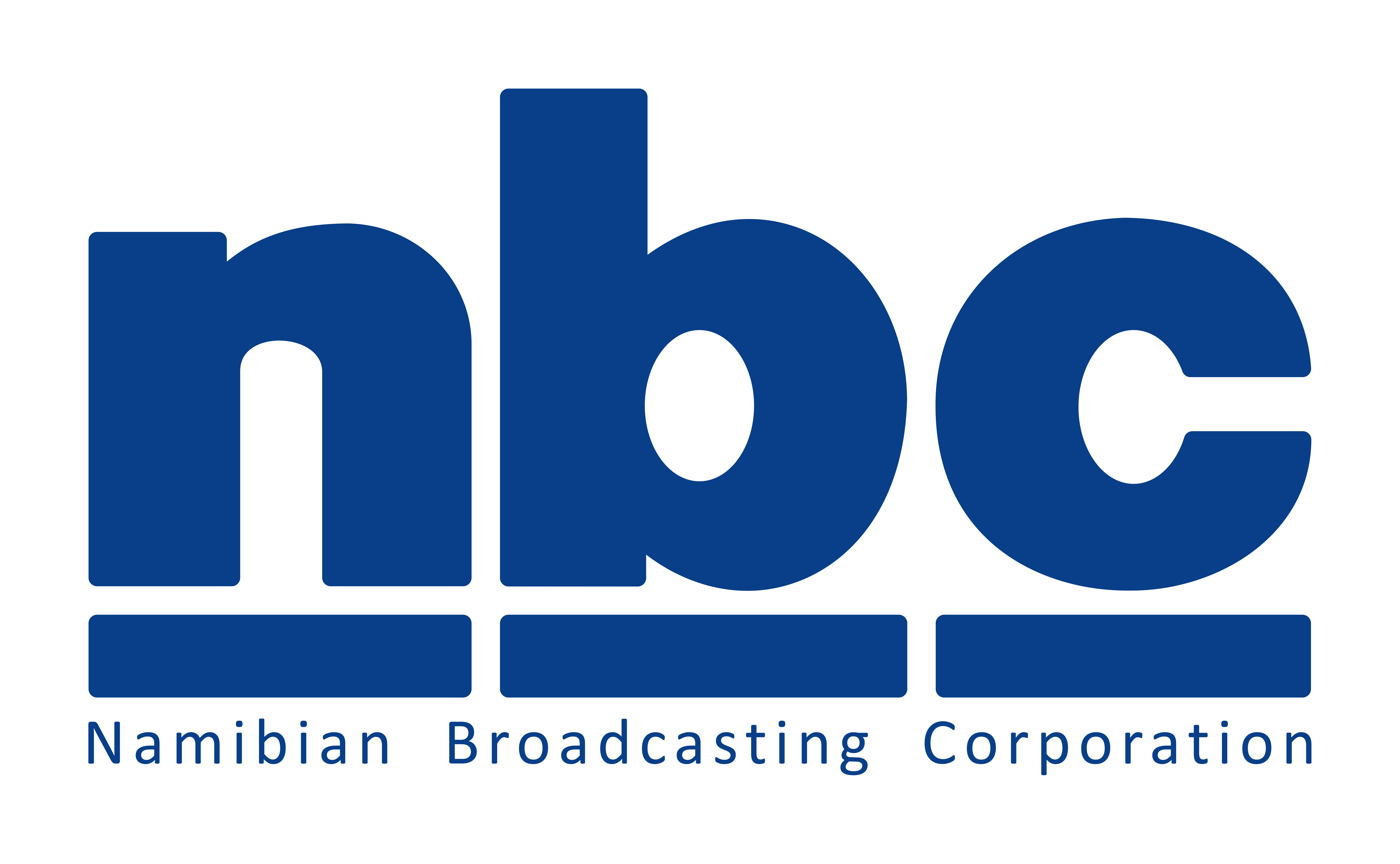
- Type: Public Broadcaster
- Branding: NBC
- Country: Namibia
- Availability: Namibia; South Africa
- Founded: May 1979 (as the SWABC, adopted current name in March 1990)
- Owner: Government of Namibia
- Former names: South West African Broadcasting Corporation
- Television: NBC1, NBC2 and NBC3
- Radio: Main Service (English); Language Services: Afrikaans; Khoekhoegowab; German; Oshiwambo; Otjiherero; RuKwangali; Setswana; siLozi; !Ha
- Official website: www.nbc.na

The Namibian Broadcasting Corporation (NBC) (Afrikaans: Namibiese Uitsaai-Korporasie, NUK; German: Namibische Rundfunkgesellschaft, NRG) is the public broadcaster of Namibia. It was established in 1979, under the name South West African Broadcasting Corporation (SWABC) or Suidwes-Afrikaanse Uitsaaikorporasie (SWAUK). In March 2026, Menesia Muinjo was appointed director-general of the corporation.

== History ==
Radio was originally broadcast in English and Afrikaans via shortwave from the South African Broadcasting Corporation's facilities in South Africa. The SABC established a local FM transmitter network in November 1969, relaying Radio South Africa, Radio Suid-Afrika, and Springbok Radio, and establishing a number of services in native languages, including Radio Ovambo, broadcasting in the Kwanyama and Ndonga languages, Radio Herero and Radio Damara Nama. The introduction of Radio Kavango along the northeastern border with Angola followed in February 1976 in the Kwangali, Mbukushu and Gciriku languages.

In 1965, the pro-independence movement, the South West Africa People's Organisation (SWAPO), began broadcasting a one-hour radio programme from Tanzania on short wave known as The Namibian Hour. It later started broadcasting from Zambia. In 1974, it was renamed Voice of Namibia. By 1986, it was broadcasting from Angola, Congo, Ethiopia, Madagascar and Zimbabwe, as well as from Tanzania and Zambia.

=== From SABC to SWABC ===
SWABC logo 1979-1990

In May 1979 the SABC relinquished control of broadcasting services in the territory, and a new broadcaster was established in its place. This was known as the South West African Broadcasting Corporation (SWABC), in Afrikaans as Suidwes-Afrikaanse Uitsaaikorporasie (SWAUK), came into being. However, 70 per cent of the SWABC's technical personnel were on secondment from the SABC. In addition, a number of its programmes were prepared at the SABC's studios in Johannesburg before being dispatched to Windhoek for transmission.

Under the authority of the South African-appointed Administrator General, the SWABC operated nine "ethnic" radio stations in English, Afrikaans, German, Owambo, Herero, Lozi, Tswana and Damara/Nama, with the national service broadcast only in English and Afrikaans. By March 1985, 85 per cent of the population had FM radio service over 31 transmitting stations.

The SWABC's television service was introduced in October 1981, serving 50 per cent of the population, via 11 transmitters. This comprised a mix of programming in English, Afrikaans and German, 90 per cent of which came from or via the SABC. Programmes were shown locally a week after South Africa. The SWABC received SABC TV programming (which it recorded, edited and rebroadcast) first by using a microwave link, and later via an Intelsat satellite link.

However, Walvis Bay, an enclave of South Africa in Namibia until 1994, received the SABC's TV1 on a low-power transmitter, which was broadcast live via Intelsat from 1986.

=== Transition to independence ===
During the transition to independence in 1989, the SWABC was accused by the United Nations Transition Assistance Group (UNTAG) of bias in its news coverage, portraying the pro-independence SWAPO party as well as UNTAG in a negative light, while being uncritical of press releases from the Administrator General's office, the police force, and anti-SWAPO parties. It was accused of particular bias towards the Democratic Turnhalle Alliance, with disproportionate coverage given to its press conferences and rallies.

In addition, in July 1989, the Administrator General was given three times as much airtime on SWABC TV as UNTAG. However, while the SWABC had offered UNTAG five minutes of radio airtime daily and a ten-minute daily television slot in May 1989, UNTAG was unable to produce adequate broadcasts and failed to benefit from its allotted airtime until late June.

=== Post-independence ===
Following independence in 1990, the new government made the decision to make English the sole language on NBC television, while the existing English-language national radio service was made the main channel for news, sport, public affairs and other programmes. Three months after independence, NBC television began broadcasting entirely in English, while broadcasting hours for radio services in other languages were reduced.

Under the pre-independence agreements, most SWABC staff were able to keep their jobs at the new broadcaster, but they were joined by SWAPO journalists who had previously worked for the Voice of Namibia, leading to accusations of bias and favouritism from both sides.

The NBC was also accused by opposition politicians of favouring SWAPO, with Nora Schimming-Chase, vice-president of the Congress of Democrats, calling it the "Nujoma Broadcasting Corporation", a reference to Namibia's then President, Sam Nujoma. The DTA of Namibia, formerly the Democratic Turnhalle Alliance, has also accused the NBC of giving coverage of political rallies that favour SWAPO at the expense of its rivals.

On 6 July 1996, two NBC TV cameras were damaged beyond repair and one was stolen, after a jazz concert failed to appear at the scheduled time. Members of the crew were also injured. The damaged cameras cost N$1.5 million.

From 2000, more local languages were added to NBC's television news, after consideration that more than 80% of its viewers did not understand English. Shortly afterwards, it was announced that NBC would start television news in Afrikaans. The delays were due to budget constraints and that all content in the language was sponsored by private companies.

The broadcaster announced an increase in licensing fees in October 2001, scheduled to be set at 13%.

NBC's public image was diminishing by the 2000s, when locals noticed that the channel was closely associated with the ruling SWAPO party. Some journalists left to join One Africa Television, its commercial competitor.

== Services ==
=== Radio ===
The NBC operates one 24-hour radio station in English (NBC National Radio, renamed National FM in 2017) and nine so-called Language Services that broadcast between 10 and 15 hours per day in Oshiwambo (Ovambo and Kwanyama; established 1969), Damara/Nama (1969) renamed "Kaisamed FM", Otjiherero (1969), Rukavango (1975), Afrikaans (1979 Afrikaanse Radio Diens, renamed Hartklop FM in 2017), German (1979 Deutsches Hörfunkprogramm, renamed Funkhaus Namibia in 2017), Setswana (1981/98), Silozi (1986) and San (ǃHa Radio, 2003).

The majority of radio stations are broadcast from radio studios in Pettenkofer Street, Windhoek, but many Oshiwambo programmes emanate from the studios in Oshakati, the Rukavango service is broadcast from the studios in Rundu, the SiLozi service from Katima Mulilo and ǃHa Radio from Tsumkwe, although these are now available nationwide via digital terrestrial television.

=== Television ===
NBC continued the television service of the SWABC introduced in 1981. Since the launch of digital terrestrial television in 2013 there are three television channels (NBC1, NBC2 and NBC3, respectively), primarily in English, but with some programming in Afrikaans, German and indigenous languages (Monday–Thursday, 17:00–17:30 on NBC1). A number of Deutsche Welle programmes also are relayed by NBC on radio and television.

NBC1 is also available on the DStv satellite television platform. NBC2 and NBC3, however, can only be accessed by the aerial television network through proprietary decoders currently being sold throughout Namibia. There was some discussion regarding the cost of these digital decoders.

It had a monopoly on free-to-air television in Namibia until 2008, when the competitor One Africa Television, a new privately owned television station was launched.

==== NBC1 ====
A free to air channel that broadcast current affairs, children's programs, telenovelas, dramas and news.

==== NBC2 ====
A free to air channel that broadcast news channels and Eye on SADC.

==== NBC3 ====
A pay television that airs dramas, telenovelas, sports and movies.

== Programs ==
=== Current ===
==== Imported shows ====
===== Animated shows =====
- Angel's Friends
- Blaze and the Monster Machines
- Dora and Friends: Into the City!
- Dora the Explorer
- Fireman Sam
- Julius Jr.
- Kate and Mim Mim
- Max Steel
- Monsters vs. Aliens
- My Little Pony: Friendship Is Magic
- NFL Rush Zone
- Panda Fanfare
- PAW Patrol
- The Penguins of Madagascar
- Pokémon
- Pumpkin Reports
- Regal Academy
- Silly Seasons
- SpongeBob SquarePants
- Storm Hawks
- Stuart Little
- Thomas and Friends
- Tickety Toc
- Totally Spies!

===== Children's programmes =====
- Mister Maker
- Scoop
- Sesame Street
- Totally Rubbish

===== Comedy =====
- Modern Family

===== Documentary =====
- Bench to Bedside
- Born into Struggle
- Once We Were Hunters

===== Drama =====
- Beijing Love Story
- Castle
- Doctors: The Ultimate Surgeon
- Rhythm City
- A Shelter for Love
- Shuga
- Whitney

===== Game shows =====
- Wipeout

===== Reality =====
- America's Got Talent
- SA's Got Talent

===== Soap operas =====
- Generations
- Scandal

===== Telenovelas =====
- Los Rey

=== Former ===
==== Imported shows ====
===== Animated shows =====
- 6teen
- The Adventures of Blinky Bill
- The Adventures of Gulliver
- Adventures of Pow Wow
- Adventures of Sinbad the Sailor
- The Adventures of Teddy Ruxpin
- The Adventures of the Little Koala
- The Adventures of Tintin
- Alfred J. Kwak
- ALF: The Animated Series
- Alice in Wonderland (anime)
- Alvin and the Chipmunks
- The Amazing Adventures of Morph
- Amigo and Friends
- Animalia
- Animated Classics
- Animated Tales of the World
- Animaniacs
- Babar
- Babar and Father Christmas
- Bannertail: The Story of Gray Squirrel
- The Bear, the Tiger and the Others
- Beast Wars: Transformers
- The Berenstain Bears (1985)
- The Berenstain Bears (2003)
- Bertie the Bat
- Beyblade
- Bionic Six
- Bozo: The World's Most Famous Clown
- Braceface
- Bright Sparks
- Brown Bear's Wedding
- The Bubblies
- Bucky O'Hare and the Toad Wars
- Bugs Bunny Specials
- The Bush Baby
- Busytown Mysteries
- Cadichon, Memoirs of a Donkey
- Cadillacs & Dinosaurs
- The California Raisin Show
- Captain Planet and the Planeteers
- Captain Zed and the Zee Zone
- The Care Bears Family
- Casper and Friends
- CBS Storybreak
- Charlie Chalk
- The Chipmunks Go to the Movies
- A Claymation Christmas Celebration
- Clifford's Fun with...
- Cococinel
- Coconuts
- Cyberchase
- Davey and Goliath
- Denver, the Last Dinosaur
- Dig & Dug with Daisy
- Dink, the Little Dinosaur
- Dinosaucers
- Diplodos
- Disney's Adventures of the Gummi Bears
- Disney's The Little Mermaid
- DoDo, The Kid from Outer Space
- Dog City
- Dog of Flanders
- Dork Hunters from Outer Space
- Dragon
- Edward and Friends
- Elliott Moose
- Fables of the Green Forest
- The Fairly OddParents!
- Fat Albert and the Cosby Kids
- Felix the Cat
- Finley the Fire Engine
- The Flying House
- Foofur
- Franklin
- Friends of the Forest
- The Get Along Gang
- Gloria's House
- Granpa
- The Great Book of Nature
- Groovie Goolies
- G.I. Joe: A Real American Hero
- Hairy and Furry
- Hammerman
- Heathcliff
- Hello Kitty's Furry Tale Theater
- Henry's Cat
- He-Man and the Masters of the Universe
- The Hillbilly Goats
- Huxley Pig
- Inspector Gadget
- The Jackson Five Show
- Jacob Two-Two
- James the Cat
- Jem
- Journey Through Nutritionland
- Just So Stories
- The Karate Kid
- Kid Paddle
- King Arthur and the Knights of Justice
- The King Kong Show
- Kissyfur
- The Kwicky Koala Show
- Laurel & Hardy
- Legend of the Dragon
- The Legend of White Fang
- The Legends of Treasure Island
- Little Bear
- Little Blue
- The Little Flying Bears
- Little Red Tractor
- Little Rosey
- Magi-Nation
- Maisy
- Malo Korrigan
- Masters of Animation
- Maya the Honey Bee
- Medabots
- Miaunel and Bălănel
- Mighty Mouse and Friends
- Mighty Mouse: The New Adventures
- Moomin
- MoonScoop Group/Mike Young
- Mouse TV
- Muzzy in Gondoland
- The Mysterious Cities of Gold
- My Little Pony
- The New Adventures of Batman
- The New Adventures of Ocean Girl
- The New Adventures of Zorro
- New Kids on the Block
- Nilus the Sandman
- Nilus the Sandman: The Boy Who Dreamed Christmas
- Noddy's Toyland Adventures
- Once Upon a Time... Life
- Orm and Cheep
- Ovide Video
- Pelswick
- Piggeldy and Frederick
- Pocahontas: Princess of the American Indians
- Poddington Peas
- Police Academy
- The Pondles
- Postman Pat
- Potatoes and Dragons
- Pound Puppies
- ProStars
- Quack Pack
- The Raccoons
- Rambo: The Force of Freedom
- ReBoot
- Ric the Raven
- Ripley's Believe It or Not!: The Animated Series
- The Road Runner Show
- Robotech
- Rod 'n' Emu
- Rolie Polie Olie
- Rupert
- Rupert the Bear
- Sagwa, the Chinese Siamese Cat
- Samson & Goliath
- Seabert
- The Secret Lives of Waldo Kitty
- Shadow Raiders
- The Shoe People
- Silent Night, Holy Night
- The Smoggies
- The Smurfs
- Spider!
- Spiff and Hercules
- Sport Billy
- Staines Down Drains
- Star Street: The Adventures of the Star Kids
- Star Wars: Ewoks
- Stories to Remember
- The Story of the Other Wise Man
- Storybook International
- Taotao
- Teddy Drop Ear
- Teenage Mutant Hero Turtles
- Tell Me a Story
- Three Kittens in the House
- Thunderbirds 2086
- Timeless Fairytales
- Tiny Toon Adventures
- Tom and Jerry
- Tom and Jerry Kids
- Tom of T.H.U.M.B.
- Tottie: The Story of a Doll's House
- The Ugly Duckling and Me!
- Ultimate Book of Spells
- Vicky the Viking
- Walt Disney's Mickey and Donald
- Warner Bros. Cartoons
- Where's Wally?
- Widget, the World Watcher
- The Wind in the Willows
- Wish Kid
- The World of David the Gnome
- The Wuzzles
- The Yaarling
- Zoo Olympics

===== Anthology =====
- Alfred Hitchcock Presents
- The Epilogue
- Insight
- Special Treat
- Tales of the Unexpected
- The Wonderful World of Disney

===== Children's programmes =====
- ABC Afterschool Special
- ABC Weekend Special
- Adventures on Kythera
- The Adventures of Black Beauty
- All for One
- The Animal Families
- Animal Park
- Animals in Action
- Baby Animal Fun
- Bananas in Pyjamas
- Barney and Friends
- Bellamy on Botany
- Big Bag
- The Big Comfy Couch
- The Big Hex of Little Lulu
- Bits and Bytes
- Body Talk
- BrainBounce!
- Brothers by Choice
- Brum
- Bush Beat
- Butterfly Island
- Cedric the Crow
- Chicken Minute
- Cloppa Castle
- Comedy Capers
- The Dodo Club
- Doffel, Babbel and Bekki
- The Doodlebops
- Elmo's World
- The Famous Five
- Fanjan die Towenaar van Drakenstein
- Five Children and It
- F.R.O.G.
- Ghostwriter
- The Girl from Tomorrow
- Goodsports
- Halfway Across the Galaxy and Turn Left
- Haydaze
- The Henderson Kids
- Hotshotz
- Huckleberry Finn and His Friends
- Hullabaloo
- I Want to Know
- Inside/Out
- Interster
- Jay Jay the Jet Plane
- Johnson and Friends
- Just for the Record
- The KangaZoo Club
- Kappatoo
- Kids Incorporated
- The Kids of Degrassi Street
- Kitty Cats
- Lassie
- Liewe Heksie
- Little Lulu
- The Little Sweep
- Little Zoo
- The Littlest Hobo
- The Longhouse Tales
- Mac and Muttley
- Mannemerak
- Matt and Jenny
- McGee and Me!
- Mike & Angelo
- Mina Moo
- Miraculous Mellops
- Mission Top Secret
- Mof and Mat
- Mother Nature
- Mr. Wizard's World
- Muggsy
- The Mystery Files of Shelby Woo
- My Secret Identity
- Ocean Girl
- The Odyssey
- Open Sesame
- Peter and his Toybox
- Pippi Longstocking
- Polka Dot Door
- Pugwall
- Pugwall's Summer
- Pumpkin Patch
- Press Gang
- Raider of the South Seas
- Rat-a-Tat-Tat
- Read All About It!
- Rockabye Bubble
- Rosie and Jim
- Round the Twist
- The Saddle Club
- Sami's Science Lab
- The Scheme of Things
- The Secret Place
- The Shak
- Shining Time Station
- Spatz
- Spirit Bay
- Spit MacPhee
- Star Runner
- Stepping Stones
- Stories Van Bergplaas
- Streetwise
- Sugar and Spice
- The Sunkist Kids
- Super Gran
- Super Gran and the World's Worst Circus
- Takalani Sesame
- Take a Look
- Take One
- Tiny Tales
- The Tomorrow People
- Tots TV
- Unfabulous
- Unicorn Tales
- Wide World of Kids
- Wielie Walie
- Wild Guess
- Winners
- Wishbone
- Wizadora
- Woof!
- Young Dracula
- Young People's Specials
- You Can Choose
- Ziki Zikombot
- Zoo Family

===== Comedy =====
- 'Allo 'Allo!
- About Face
- ALF
- All Is Forgiven
- All of Us
- Baby Boom
- The Benny Hill Show
- The Bernie Mac Show
- Better Days
- The Beverly Hillbillies
- Blackadder
- Boy Meets World
- Bustin' Loose
- Camp Wilderness
- Charles in Charge
- Cheers
- Coach
- Coming of Age
- The Cosby Show
- Da Kink in My Hair
- Dear John
- Desmond's
- A Different World
- Doc
- Dog House
- Doogie Howser, M.D.
- Duty Free
- Evening Shade
- Everybody Hates Chris
- Family Matters
- Family Ties
- Fawlty Towers
- Finnegan Begin Again
- First Impressions
- FM
- For Love and Honor
- The Fresh Prince of Bel-Air
- Full House
- The Game
- Gloria
- The Golden Girls
- Great Scott!
- Growing Pains
- Haggard
- He's the Mayor
- The Hogan Family
- Home to Roost
- The Hughleys
- The Jeffersons
- Karen's Song
- Lenny Henry in Pieces
- Life Goes On
- Life's Most Embarrassing Moments
- Man of the People
- Ma-plotters
- Melba
- Mr Bean
- Mr. Belvedere
- Newhart
- The New Statesman
- Night Court
- Off the Hook
- One on One
- Oos/Wes
- The Orchestra
- Orkney Snork Nie
- Out All Night
- Perfect Strangers
- Punky Brewster
- Red Dwarf
- The Righteous Apples
- Saved by the Bell
- Scorch
- The Slap Maxwell Story
- Taxi
- Tycoon: The Story of a Woman
- Tyler Perry's House of Payne
- Valerie
- We Got It Made
- Who's the Boss?
- WKRP in Cincinnati

===== Detective =====
- Riptide

===== Documentary =====
- The Animal Express
- Animals of Africa
- The Africans: A Triple Heritage
- Art of the Western World
- As Long as the Rivers Flow
- The Ascent of Man
- Be the Creature
- The Beer Hunter
- Black Gold: The History of Oil
- Blue Revolution
- The Classic Touch
- Cosmos: A Personal Voyage
- Cover Story
- The Day the Universe Changed
- The Desperate Passage Series
- Destination America
- Disaster Chronicles
- Elizabeth R: A Year in the Life of the Queen
- Eyes on the Prize
- Faces of Culture
- Fragile Earth
- From Monkeys to Apes
- From the Pacific Rim
- Football Made in Germany
- The Greatest
- Gute Laune mit Musik
- Hans Haas: My Life in the Sea
- Heat Personal Fitness
- How an Aeroplane Flies
- Jerusalem of Heaven and Earth
- The Living Planet
- Living with Lions
- Local Heroes, Global Change
- Love: Stories in a Time of HIV/AIDS
- Maria Callas: Vissi d'arte
- Mobutu, King of Zaire
- The Most Extreme
- National Geographic Explorer
- Noah's Ark
- Our Finite World
- Perspective: Laser Surgery
- The Planets
- Portrait of the Soviet Union
- Race to Save the Planet
- Rescue 911
- Smithsonian World
- Starring... the Actors
- Stories from an African Hospital
- Stress, Are You Coping?
- Suspended Dreams
- Thanh's War
- The Trials of Life
- Two Deserts: Sahara and Sonora
- Under African Skies
- A View of Britain
- Vista
- What About Tomorrow
- What's Up Doc?: A Salute to Bugs Bunny
- Women in Jazz
- The World We Live In

===== Drama =====
- 50/50
- 7th Heaven
- Aaron's Way
- Act of Will
- Adderly
- The Adventures of Sherlock Holmes
- The Adventures of the Black Stallion
- African Journey
- The Agatha Christie Hour
- After the War
- Airwolf
- The Alien Years
- All the Rivers Run
- Always Greener
- Always Remember I Love You
- Anne of Green Gables
- Around the World in 80 Days
- Assault and Matrimony
- Automan
- The A-Team
- Baywatch
- Beauty and the Beast
- Beryl Markham: A Shadow on the Sun
- Beverly Hills, 90210
- Billionaire Boys Club
- A Bit of a Do
- The Black Tower
- Blue Murder
- The Blue Revolution
- Bordertown
- Born Free
- The Bourne Identity
- The Boys of St. Vincent
- Breakers
- Brideshead Revisited
- Brotherhood of the Rose
- Call to Glory
- The Campbells
- Capital News
- Captain James Cook
- Casino
- A Child Lost Forever: The Jerry Sherwood Story
- The Conversion of Colonel Bottomly
- Counterstrike
- Crime Story
- The Critical List
- Crossbow
- The Crucifer of Blood
- Crusoe
- C.A.T.S. Eyes
- Dadah Is Death
- Danger Bay
- Daniel and the Lions
- Daniel Boone
- The Darling Buds of May
- Darlings of the Gods
- Das Rätsel der Sandbank
- DEA
- Dead on the Money
- Der Fuchs
- Die Insel
- Die Seders van Lebanon
- Die seltsamen Methoden des Franz Josef Wanninger
- The District
- Doctors' Quarters
- Dreunkrans
- Dr. Kildare
- Earth Star Voyager
- Echoes
- Edward & Mrs. Simpson
- Emerald Point N.A.S.
- Emergency!
- The Equalizer
- E.N.G.
- The Fall Guy
- Fame
- The Fifteen Streets
- Fine Things
- First Among Equals
- The Flash
- The Flying Doctors
- Fly by Night
- Gabriel's Fire
- Game, Set and Match
- Games Mother Never Taught You
- Glory Enough for All
- The Gravy Train
- Guillam Woudberg
- Hardcastle and McCormick
- Hart to Hart
- The Haunting Passion
- Hawkins
- Here's Boomer
- Highway to Heaven
- Hill Street Blues
- Hoekie vir Eensames
- Hold the Dream
- Homefront
- Homicide: Life on the Street
- Hooperman
- Hot Pursuit
- I'll Fly Away
- I'll Take Manhattan
- If Tomorrow Comes
- In a Time of Violence
- In the Heat of the Night
- The Incredible Hulk
- Inspektion Lauenstadt
- Intimate Contact
- Island Son
- Jack the Ripper
- Jamaica Inn
- Jennifer's Journey
- The JFK Conspiracy
- Judith Krantz's Till We Meet Again
- Just Cause
- J.J. Starbuck
- Kane and Abel
- Katrin Becomes a Soldier
- Katts and Dog
- Kay O'Brien
- The Kennedys of Massachusetts
- Kinders van die Sabbatsee
- King Lear
- Knight Rider
- Kojak
- The Lancaster Miller Affair
- The Last Place on Earth
- The Last to Go
- The Law & Harry McGraw
- LBJ: The Early Years
- A Life Interrupted
- Liken: Esther and the King
- Lorentz and Sons
- Lou Grant
- L.A. Law
- MacGyver
- A Man Called Hawk
- The Man Who Lived at the Ritz
- Matlock
- Matt Houston
- McLeod's Daughters
- Memories of Midnight
- Miami Vice
- Michigan Melody
- Mickey Spillane's Mike Hammer
- Midnight Caller
- Mom P.I.
- Moonlighting
- Moord op die Lug
- Mount Royal
- Mr. Krueger's Christmas
- Murder, She Wrote
- My Brother Tom
- The Mysterious Stranger
- Neon Rider
- Night of the Fox
- Norah's Christmas Gift
- North and South
- The Old Fox
- Onassis: The Richest Man in the World
- Operation Julie
- Orpheus Descending
- The Other Side of Paradise
- Our House
- Pacific Drive
- Paris
- Peter the Great
- A Place to Call Home
- Policewoman Centerfold
- Poor Little Rich Girl: The Barbara Hutton Story
- Prime Suspect
- Princess Daisy
- Prison Stories: Women on the Inside
- The Private War of Lucinda Smith
- Pros and Cons
- Prospects
- The Protectors
- P.S. I Luv U
- Race Against Tomorrow
- Rage of Angels
- Random Passage
- Reasonable Doubts
- Remington Steele
- Rieksie Rautenbach: Baasspeurder
- Rienie
- The River Kings
- Road to Avonlea
- Roc
- The Rogue Stallion
- Rose Against the Odds
- Roots: The Next Generations
- The Ruth Rendell Mysteries
- Saartjie
- Sea Hunt
- Selling Hitler
- Separate But Equal
- Shadows in Paradise
- Sherlock Holmes and the Leading Lady
- Shillingbury Tales
- Sidney Sheldon's If Tomorrow Comes
- Silence of the Heart
- Silk Stalkings
- Snoops
- Snowy
- Spenser: For Hire
- Stanley and the Women
- Stay Lucky
- The Streets of San Francisco
- St. Elsewhere
- A Taste for Death
- Tattingers
- Thirtysomething
- This Man... This Woman
- This Is Wonderland
- The Ties That Bind (local drama, 2008)
- Thornwell
- Tinker Tailor Soldier Spy
- To Be the Best
- Top of the Hill
- Touched by an Angel
- The Trials of Rosie O'Neill
- Travellers by Night
- Tropical Heat
- Twice Shy
- Twin Peaks
- T. and T.
- T. J. Hooker
- Urban Angel
- A Very British Coup
- Via Mala
- The Villagers
- Voice of the Heart
- Waldhaus
- The War of the Oxen
- The White Shadow
- Wild Card
- Wild Grizzly
- Wilson's Reward
- Windmills of the Gods
- The Wizard
- Wolf
- A Woman Named Jackie
- A Woman of Substance
- A Year in the Life
- Young Ramsay
- Zorro

===== Education =====
- Beyond 2000
- Discover: The World of Science
- Group One Medical
- Follow Me!
- National Geographic Specials
- The Voyage of the Mimi
- Thy Whys and Wherefores

===== Game shows =====
- Fun & Fortune
- Treasure Hunt

===== Magazine =====
- After Nine
- Ebony/Jet Showcase

===== Music =====
- An Evening with Plácido Domingo
- Dancedaze
- The Joy of Music
- Disco Rally
- The Herb Alpert Show
- Living Concert with Don Francisco
- Fela Kuti: Music Is the Weapon
- The New Generation
- On the Beam
- Paul Simon's Concert in the Park
- Perahia Plays Beethoven Piano Concerto
- Power Hits USA
- Ray Charles: 50 Years in Music
- Red Hot and Cool
- The Roxy

===== Musical =====
- Alice in Wonderland (1985 film)

===== Reality =====
- Boot Camp
- Candid Camera
- Counterpoint
- Gettin' Over
- Lifestyles of the Rich and Famous
- Prime Time Pets

===== Soap operas =====
- Another Life
- The Black Forest Clinic
- Dynasty
- Falcon Crest
- Home and Away
- Knots Landing
- Mount Royal
- Neighbours
- Prime Time
- Santa Barbara

===== Sports =====
- Gillette World Sport Special
- World of Guinness Records

===== Talk shows =====
- The 700 Club
- Dr. Phil
- The Jerry Lewis Show
- Jimmy Swaggart
- The Oprah Winfrey Show
- The Patricia Show
- Police File
- Show Express
- Teletien
- Uiet en Tuis
- The Whoopi Goldberg Show

===== Telenovelas =====
- The Gardener's Daughter
- My 3 Sisters
- No One But You
- Shades of Sin
- The Rich Also Cry

===== Variety =====
- Applause, Applause
- Frank Sidebottom's Fantastic Shed Show
- Showtime at the Apollo

===== Western =====
- The Alamo: 13 Days to Glory
- The Big Valley
- Calamity Jane
- Father Murphy
- Five Mile Creek
- Gunsmoke
- Harts of the West
- The High Chaparral
- How the West Was Won
- Lonesome Dove
- Paradise
- The Young Riders
