= List of programmes broadcast by RTÉ2 =

The following is a list of broadcasts aired on what has at various times been identified by a combination of the following: RTÉ 2/Network 2/ RTÉ Two and RTÉ2.

== Current broadcasts ==
Home-produced

- (Republic of Ireland) Dancing with the Stars (2017–present)
- (Republic of Ireland) It's a Park's Life
- (Republic of Ireland) Living the Wildlife
- (Republic of Ireland) Natural World
- (Republic of Ireland) News Feed (2014–present)
- (Republic of Ireland) Pet Island
- (Republic of Ireland) Republic of Telly (2009–present)
- (Republic of Ireland) The Sunday Game (1979–present)
- (Republic of Ireland) Two Tube (2009–present)

Australia & New Zealand

- (Australia) Home and Away (1988–present)
- (Australia) Neighbours (1985–present)
- Wild New Zealand

USA

- (United States) 90210 (2008–2013)
- (United States) Agent Carter (2015–present)
- (United States) Agents of S.H.I.E.L.D. (2013–present)
- (United States) The Americans (2013–present)
- (United States) The Big Bang Theory
- (United States) The Big C (2010–2013)
- (United States) Chicago P.D.
- (United States) Cougar Town (2010–2015)
- (United States) CSI (2000–2015)
- (United States) CSI Cyber (2015–present)
- (United States) Entourage (2005–2012)
- (United States) The Goldbergs (2013–2025)
- (United States) Gotham
- (United States) Grey's Anatomy (2005–present)
- (United States) Homeland (2011–present)
- (United States) How to Get Away with Murder
- (United States) Masters of Sex (2013–present)
- (United States) NCIS: New Orleans
- (United States) New Girl (2013–present)
- (United States) Once Upon a Time
- (United States) Reign (2013–present)
- (United States) Resurrection (2014–2015)
- (United States) The Simpsons (1997–present)
- (United States) Suburgatory (2011–present)
- (United States) The Walking Dead (2010–present)

Canada

- (Canada) The Next Steps

UK

- (United Kingdom) Alan Carr: Chatty Man
- (United Kingdom) Amazing Hotels
- (United Kingdom) Deadly 60
- (United Kingdom) The Dog Rescuers
- (United Kingdom) Don't Tell the Bride
- (United Kingdom) Emmerdale
- (United Kingdom) Father Ted (1995–present)
- (United Kingdom) Fawlty Towers
- (United Kingdom) The General
- (United Kingdom) Live at the Apollo
- (United Kingdom) Mr. Bean: The Animated Series
- (United Kingdom) Top Gear
- (United Kingdom) World's Busiest Cities

Young children's programming

- (United Kingdom) 64 Zoo Lane
- (United Kingdom) Abadas
- (Republic of Ireland) AbraKIDabra!
- (United Kingdom) Angelina Ballerina: The Next Steps
- (United Kingdom) The Animals of Farthing Wood (1993–present)
- (United States) Animaniacs (1994–present)
- (United States) (Canada) Arthur
- (United Kingdom) Balamory
- (Australia) Bananas in Pyjamas (CGI series)
- (France) Best Bugs Forever
- (United Kingdom) Ben & Holly's Little Kingdom
- (United Kingdom) Bing
- (Australia) Bluey
- (United Kingdom) Bob the Builder (2015 series)
- (United Kingdom) Bob the Builder: Project Build It
- (United Kingdom) Boj
- (Republic of Ireland) Brain Freeze
- (Republic of Ireland) Brewster the Rooster
- (United Kingdom) Chuggington
- (United Kingdom) The Clangers (2015 series)
- (France) (China) Corneil and Bernie
- (Republic of Ireland) Critters.TV
- (United Kingdom) Danger Mouse (2015 series)
- (United States) Dawn of the Croods
- (Republic of Ireland) The Day Henry Met
- (Canada) The Deep
- (Republic of Ireland) Dig in Diner (2015–present)
- (Canada) Dorg Van Dango
- (United Kingdom) Dream Street
- (Australia) Drop Dead Weird
- (United States) (Russia) (United Kingdom) (France) (Canada) Enchantimals: Tales From Everwilde
- (United Kingdom) Everything's Rosie
- (United Kingdom) Fifi and the Flowertots
- (United Kingdom) Fimbles
- (Wales) Fireman Sam
- (Republic of Ireland) Fluffy Gardens (2006–2016)
- (United States) Gabby's Dollhouse
- (United Kingdom) Gigglebiz
- (United Kingdom) Go Jetters
- (United Kingdom) Hey Duggee
- (Canada) (United States) Holly Hobbie
- (United Kingdom) Horrible Histories (2015 series)
- (Canada) (United States) Hotel Transylvania: The Series
- (United Kingdom) In the Night Garden...
- (Republic of Ireland) Inis Spraoi
- (United States) Jumanji
- (Canada) (United Kingdom) Kate & Mim-Mim
- (Japan) K-ON!
- (Canada) (United States) Kody Kapow
- (United States) Kiva Can Do
- (Republic of Ireland) Lifeboat Luke
- (Canada) Life with Boys
- (United Kingdom) Lily's Driftwood Bay
- (Republic of Ireland) Little Roy
- (United States) The Loud House
- (Republic of Ireland) Magical Sites
- (United States) The Marvelous Misadventures of Flapjack
- (United Kingdom) (Canada) (India) Matt Hatter Chronicles
- (United Kingdom) (Scotland) Me Too!
- (United Kingdom) Millie Inbetween
- (United Kingdom) (Canada) Mike the Knight
- (France) Molang
- (United Kingdom) Mr Bloom's Nursery
- (Republic of Ireland) Mr. Mender and the Chummyjiggers
- (United Kingdom) My Pet and Me
- (United Kingdom) Nelly and Nora
- (United Kingdom) Nina and the Neurons
- (United Kingdom) (France) Noddy, Toyland Detective
- (United Kingdom) The Numtums
- (United Kingdom) (Republic of Ireland) The Octonauts
- (United Kingdom) Old Jack's Boat
- (Republic of Ireland) Our Seaside
- (United Kingdom) (Republic of Ireland) Pablo (2017–present)
- (Canada) Paw Patrol
- (United Kingdom) Peppa Pig
- (Japan) Pokémon
- (United States) Pinky and the Brain (1996–present)
- (United Kingdom) Pip Ahoy!
- (United Kingdom) Poppy Cat
- (United Kingdom) Postman Pat (2003 series)
- (Canada) (Australia) Prank Patrol Down Under
- (Republic of Ireland) Puffin Rock (2015–present)
- (Republic of Ireland) Punky
- (Republic of Ireland) Rocketeers
- (United Kingdom) Sarah & Duck
- (United Kingdom) Shaun the Sheep
- (United Kingdom) Show Me Show Me
- (United Kingdom) Spot Bots
- (Republic of Ireland) Storytime
- (United Kingdom) Strange Hill High
- (Republic of Ireland) Sullivan Sails (September 2021–present)
- (United Kingdom) Swashbuckle
- (United States) Teen Titans Go!
- (United Kingdom) Thomas & Friends
- (United Kingdom) (New Zealand) Thunderbirds Are Go
- (United Kingdom) (Republic of Ireland) Tilly and Friends
- (United Kingdom) Tree Fu Tom
- (France) Trust Me I'm a Genie
- (United States) Turbo Fast
- (United Kingdom) Wallace & Gromit
- (Republic of Ireland) What Makes My Day
- (United States) (Canada) Wild Kratts
- (Brazil) (United Kingdom) Wildernuts
- (Republic of Ireland) Wildwoods
- (Republic of Ireland) WooHOO Splash!
- (United Kingdom) Woolly and Tig
- (Japan) Yu-Gi-Oh!: GX: Rise of the Sacred Beasts
- (Republic of Ireland) (United Kingdom) Zig and Zag

Nordic region

- (Denmark) 1864 (2014)
- (Denmark) The Saboteurs: The Heavy Water War (2014)

== Historic home-produced television programmes ==
=== 0–9 ===
- 2Phat
- 2TV

=== A ===
- Against the Head
- Anonymous
- Après Match
- Auld Ones

=== B ===
- Bachelors Walk
- Bazil's Culture Clash
- The Beatbox
- Black Box
- Blackboard Jungle
- The Blizzard of Oz
- Bosco

=== C ===
- The Cassidys

=== D ===
- The Daisy Shoe
- Dan & Becs
- Deep Fried Swamp
- Dempsey's Den/The Den/Den TV/Den 2
- The Disney Club
- Do the Right Thing
- Don's Slot
- Don't Feed the Gondolas
- Dream Teams
- Dummy Run
- Dustin's Daily News

=== E ===
- Echo Island
- Ed Byrne's Just For Laughs/Neil Delamere's Just For Laughs
- The End
- The Ex-Files

=== F ===
- Fade Street
- The Fame Game
- Fergus's Wedding
- FISH
- The Floradora Folk
- Finbar's Class

=== G ===
- Good Grief Moncrieff!
- Gridlock
- Green TV

=== I ===
- ICE
- Island Wildlife

=== J ===
- Jo Maxi
- Jump Around

=== K ===
- Katherine Lynch

=== L ===
- The Last Furlong
- Later on 2
- Leave It to Mrs. O'Brien
- Legend
- Livin' with Lucy
- The Lucy Kennedy Show

=== M ===
- Makin' Jake
- Marketplace
- Meet Your Neighbours
- Mission Beach USA
- The Modest Adventures of David O'Doherty
- Monday Night Soccer
- The Morbegs
- The Movie Show
- MT-USA
- Murphy's America
- Murphy's Australia

=== N ===
- Naked Camera
- Neddy
- Network News
- News 2
- news2day
- Newsnight
- Nighthawks
- No Disco

=== O ===
- The Once a Week Show
- Other Voices
- Our House

=== P ===
- Pajo and the Salty Frog
- Pajo and the Salty Frog in Space
- Pajo's Junkbox
- The Panel
- Paths to Freedom
- Plastic Orange
- Play the Game
- The Podge and Rodge Show
- Popscene
- The Premiership/Premier Soccer Saturday
- Prosperity
- Pure Mule

=== R ===
- Raw
- The Remini Riddle
- Republic of Telly
- Return of the Swamp Thing
- RTÉ News on Two

=== S ===
- The Saturday Club
- A Scare at Bedtime
- The Selection Box
- Soupy Norman
- The Sports Files
- Stew
- Stream
- The Sunday Game
- The Swamp
- The Swamp Shop
- The Swamp Summer Salad

=== T ===
- This Is Nightlive
- TX

=== U ===
- The Unbelievable Truth

=== V ===
- The View

=== W ===
- Wanderlust

=== X ===
- X-it File
- X-it Poll

== Imported programming ==
=== Current ===
- Grey's Anatomy
- Home and Away
- Orange
- Locodol
- Parenthood
- The Simpsons

=== Historic ===
- 16 Days of Glory
- 100 Great Paintings
- 240-Robert
- 3rd Rock from the Sun
- The 5 Mrs. Buchanans
- 9 to 5
- 'Allo 'Allo!
- The A-Team
- The Abbott and Costello Show
- Absolutely Fabulous
- The Adventures of Brisco County, Jr.
- The Adventures of Lano and Woodley
- The Adventures of Swiss Family Robinson
- The Adventures of the Black Stallion
- African Skies
- After the War
- Agatha Christie's Poirot
- Airline (1982 series)
- Airwolf
- Alexei Sayle's Stuff
- Alfred Hitchcock Presents
- ALF
- Alias
- All Creatures Great and Small
- Ally McBeal
- Ally
- Amazon
- American Dreamer
- The Americans
- An Exceptional Child
- ...And Mother Makes Three
- Apple's Way
- Are You Being Served?
- Armchair Thriller
- After Henry
- Arthur C. Clarke's Mysterious World
- Arthur C. Clarke's World of Strange Powers
- Austin Stories
- And Mother Makes Five
- The Avengers
- The Barchester Chronicles
- Barnaby Jones
- Barney Miller
- Bangkok Hilton
- Battlestar Galactica
- Baywatch
- The Beatles Anthology
- Becker
- Beggars and Choosers
- The Benny Hill Show
- Benson
- Bergerac
- Best Sellers
- Bewitched
- The Beverly Hillbillies
- Beverly Hills, 90210
- Beyond 2000
- The Big Easy
- The Big Match
- Big Shamus, Little Shamus
- The Bill
- Biography
- The Bionic Woman
- Blackadder Goes Forth
- Black Books
- Black Forest Clinic
- Blake's 7
- Blankety Blank
- Blind Justice
- Blue Heelers
- Blue Thunder
- Bonanza
- Boogies Diner
- Bookmark
- Boston Common
- Boston Public
- Boys from the Blackstuff
- The Brady Bunch
- Brass
- The Bretts
- Brideshead Revisited
- Brimstone
- The Bronx Zoo
- Brooklyn Bridge
- Buck Rogers in the 25th Century
- Bugs
- Cabbages and Kings (Game show)
- California Dreams
- Call My Bluff
- Callan
- The Campbells
- Campus Cops
- Cannon and Ball
- The Cape
- Capital News
- Captains and the Kings
- Car 54, Where Are You?
- Cardiac Arrest
- Caroline in the City
- Carry On Laughing
- The Castaways
- Celebrity Squares
- Central Park West
- Charlie's Angels
- Check It Out!
- Cheers
- A Child's Christmas in Wales
- China Beach
- Christy
- The Cisco Kid
- The Civil War
- Clueless
- Coach
- Code Red
- The Colbys
- Colditz
- Columbo
- The Commish
- Coronation Street
- Consuming Passions
- The Cosby Show
- A Country Practice
- Covington Cross
- The Cowra Breakout
- Crazy Like a Fox
- The Critic
- Crossbow
- The Crow: Stairway to Heaven
- Crusades
- Cybill
- Danger Bay
- Dark Angel
- Dawson's Creek
- The Days and Nights of Molly Dodd
- Deadly Games
- Death Valley Days
- Dempsey and Makepeace
- Desperate Housewives
- Dharma and Greg
- Diagnosis: Murder
- Diamonds
- Dickens of London
- The Dick Cavett Show
- The Dick Emery Show
- Die Geschwister Oppermann
- Diff'rent Strokes
- Dinosaurs
- The District
- Doc Elliot
- The Donny and Marie Show
- Doogie Howser, M.D.
- Drama with Anna
- Dr. Quinn, Medicine Woman
- Due South
- Durrell in Russia
- Dweebs
- Dynasty (1981 series)
- Earth: Final Conflict
- Ed
- The Eddie Capra Mysteries
- Edward and Mrs. Simpson
- Eerie, Indiana
- Ellen
- Empty Nest
- Entourage
- ER
- The Event
- Executive Stress
- Explore
- Extra
- Ever Decreasing Circles
- Every Window Tells a Story
- Everybody Loves Raymond
- E.N.G.
- Falcon Crest
- The Fall and Rise of Reginald Perrin
- The Fall Guy
- Fame
- Fame L.A.
- Family Matters
- Family Ties
- Father of the Pride
- Felicity
- Ferris Bueller
- A Fine Romance
- First Time Out
- Flambards
- A Flame to the Phoenix
- Flash Gordon Conquers the Universe
- FlashForward
- Flight into Hell
- The Flintstones
- Flipper (1964 series)
- The Flying Doctors
- Fortunes of War
- Foul-Ups, Bleeps & Blunders
- The Foundation
- Frasier
- Frankenstein's Aunt
- Frank's Place
- The Fresh Prince of Bel-Air
- The Fugitive
- Game On
- Game, Set and Match
- The Generation Game
- Get Smart
- Globe Trekker
- Gloria
- God, the Devil and Bob
- The Golden Girls
- Golden Soak
- Golden Years
- Goodbye, Mr Kent
- Grace Under Fire
- Great Little Railways
- The Great Moghuls
- The Gregory Hines Show
- The Grimleys
- Grounded for Life
- Guitar with Frederick Noad
- Gun
- Halifax f.p.
- Hamish Macbeth
- Hang Time
- Happy Days
- Hardcastle and McCormick
- The Hardy Boys
- Harry and the Hendersons
- Harry O
- Hart to Hart
- Hawkeye
- Head of the Class
- Heimat: A Chronicle of Germany
- Heartbreak High
- The Henderson Kids
- Here's Lucy
- Higher Ground
- Hill Street Blues
- Hippies
- Home Improvement
- A Home in the Green Land
- Home to Roost
- Homicide: Life on the Street
- The Hong Kong Beat
- House of Cards
- How We Learned to Ski
- Hoyt 'n Andy's Sportsbender
- I Dream of Jeannie
- I, Claudius
- In Loving Memory
- In the Heat of the Night
- Inspector Morse
- The Invisible Man (1975 series)
- Island Son
- It's Like, You Know...
- The Jackie Gleason Show
- Jake and the Fatman
- Jeeves and Wooster
- Jesse
- The Jewel in the Crown
- Jim'll Fix It
- Joey
- Kate and Allie
- Katts and Dog
- King of the Hill
- King Lear (1982 series)
- The Knock
- Knots Landing
- Knight Rider (1982 series)
- Kojak
- Kung Fu
- Land of the Giants
- The Larry Sanders Show
- The Last Days of Pompeii
- The Late, Late Breakfast Show
- Laurel and Hardy
- Laurence Olivier Presents
- Law & Order
- The League of Gentlemen
- Legendary Trails
- Life Goes On
- Life on Earth
- Lillie
- The Living Planet
- Lois & Clark: The New Adventures of Superman
- Longstreet
- Lou Grant
- Love & War
- Lost
- The Lotus Eaters
- Love in a Cold Climate
- The Lucie Arnaz Show
- Lytton's Diary
- MacGyver
- Major Dad
- Malibu Shores
- Manimal
- Manions of America
- The Man from U.N.C.L.E.
- Marlin Bay
- Married... with Children
- The Mary Tyler Moore Show
- Mastermind
- May to December
- McKenna
- Melrose Place (1992 series)
- Men Behaving Badly
- Messengers from Moscow
- Mickey Spillane's Mike Hammer (1984 series)
- Millennium
- Minder
- The Mind of Mr. J.G. Reeder
- Mind Your Language
- Misfits of Science
- Mistral's Daughter
- Mitch
- Moesha
- Mom P.I.
- The Monkees
- Monster: A Portrait of Stalin in Blood
- Monty Python's Flying Circus
- Moonlighting
- Mork and Mindy
- Movie Magic
- Mr. Belvedere
- Mr. Merlin
- Mr. President
- Mr Smith's Favourite Garden
- The Munsters Today
- The Muppet Show
- Muppets Tonight
- Murder Call
- Murder, She Wrote
- Murphy Brown
- Music at Harewood
- My Favorite Martian
- My So-Called Life
- Mysteries of the Sea
- M*A*S*H
- Nancy Astor
- The Nanny
- Nanny
- The Nature of Things
- Nature's Kingdom
- Nash Bridges
- Nashville Swing
- Neon Rider
- Never the Twain
- Newhart
- The New Adventures of Robin Hood
- New York Undercover
- No Job for a Lady
- The Norman Conquests
- Northern Exposure
- Nowhere Man
- The Nutt House
- NYPD Blue
- The Odd Couple (1970 series)
- Oh Madeline
- Oh No, It's Selwyn Froggitt!
- Old House, New House
- One Foot in the Grave
- One Man and His Dog
- One More Time!
- Only Fools and Horses
- Only When I Laugh
- Operavox: The Animated Operas
- The Optimist
- The Osbournes
- Our Gang
- Our Hero
- The Outer Limits
- Palmerstown, U.S.A.
- Pan Am
- The Paper Chase
- Paradise Postponed
- The Parkers
- Party of Five
- Peer Gynt and His Mother
- The People's Court
- Perfect Strangers
- Persuasion (1971 series)
- The Petrov Affair
- Peyton Place
- Planet Earth
- Pole to Pole
- Poor Little Rich Girl: The Barbara Hutton Story
- Popular
- Porridge
- Praying Mantis
- Prime Suspect
- Prison Break
- Private Practice
- Private Schulz
- Project Z
- Quincy, M.E.
- Rapido
- Reasonable Doubts
- Red Dwarf
- The Return of Sherlock Holmes
- Return of the Saint
- Return to Treasure Island
- Rhoda
- Riding High
- Ripley's Believe It or Not! (1949 series)
- Rising Damp
- The Rivals of Sherlock Holmes
- The Road to War
- The Rockford Files
- Roots: The Next Generations
- Roseanne
- Rowan & Martin's Laugh-In
- The Royle Family
- Rumpole of the Bailey
- Ryan's Hope
- Sabrina the Teenage Witch
- Saved by the Bell
- Scarecrow and Mrs. King
- Scotland's Story
- Screen Two
- Scrubs
- SeaQuest DSV
- Secret Army
- The Secret Life of Us
- Secret Nature
- Seinfeld
- Selling Hitler
- Shakespeare: The Animated Tales
- Sha Na Na
- Shillingbury Tales
- Sidekicks
- Silver Spoons
- Sister, Sister
- Sledge Hammer!
- Sliders
- Slinger's Day
- Smallville
- The Smith Family
- Something Wilder
- The Sopranos
- Spaced
- Spaceflight
- Space Precinct
- Special Squad
- Spenser: For Hire
- Spies
- Spin City
- Spitting Image
- Square Deal
- Stargate SG-1
- Starman
- Star Runner
- Star Trek
- Star Trek: Deep Space Nine
- Star Trek: The Next Generation
- The Stationary Ark
- Stay Lucky
- The Story of Fashion
- The Storyteller
- Strangers and Brothers
- Street Legal (1987 series)
- The Streets of San Francisco
- St. Elsewhere
- Suddenly Susan
- The Sullivans
- The Sun Also Rises (1984 film)
- Surgical Spirit
- Survival
- $weepstake$
- Sweet Valley High
- Swim
- The Sword of Islam
- Sykes
- Taggart
- Tales from the Dark Side
- Tales of the Unexpected
- Taxi
- Telford's Change
- Tenko
- That '70s Show
- That's Hollywood
- That's My Boy (1981 series)
- Third Watch
- Thirtysomething
- This Is Your Life (British version)
- This Life
- The Three Stooges
- Tide of Life
- The Timeless Land
- Tinsel Town
- Tom Grattan's War
- Tomorrow's World
- Top of the Hill
- Top of the Pops
- The Tracey Ullman Show
- Trapper John, M.D.
- The Travelin' Gourmet
- Treasure Island in Outer Space
- The Trials of Life
- Tripper's Day
- The Twilight Zone (1985 series)
- Twin Peaks
- Two of a Kind
- Two's Company
- UC: Undercover
- Unforgettable (1981 series)
- United States of Tara
- The Unknown War
- Unsub
- Up the Garden Path
- Upstairs, Downstairs (1971 series)
- Veronica's Closet
- Vietnam: The Ten Thousand Day War
- The Virginian
- Wait Till Your Father Gets Home
- Walking with Beasts
- Wanted Dead or Alive
- War and Remembrance
- Water Rats
- Wayne and Shuster
- We Got It Made
- When the Boat Comes In
- Where the Sky Begins
- White Fang
- Who Pays the Ferryman?
- Who's the Boss?
- Wild, Wild World of Animals
- Wilde Alliance
- Wings
- Wiseguy
- WKRP in Cincinnati
- Wogan
- The Wonder Years
- World in Action
- The X-Files
- Xena: Warrior Princess
- A Year in the Life
- Young at Heart
- Young Lions
- The Young Indiana Jones Chronicles
- The Young Ones
- The Young Person's Guide to Becoming a Rock Star
- Zorro (1990 series)

=== Young children's programming ===
- The 13 Ghosts of Scooby-Doo
- 2 Stupid Dogs
- 24Seven
- 3-2-1 Contact
- Ace Ventura: Pet Detective
- Action League Now!
- Action Man (1995 series)
- Action Man (2000 series)
- The Addams Family (1973 series)
- The Addams Family (1992 series)
- The Adventure Series
- The Adventures of Blinky Bill
- The Adventures of Bottle Top Bill and His Best Friend Corky
- The Adventures of a Mouse
- The Adventures of Dawdle the Donkey
- The Adventures of Hyperman
- The Adventures of Jimmy Neutron, Boy Genius
- The Adventures of Mole
- The Adventures of Paddington Bear
- The Adventures of Pete and Pete
- The Adventures of Raggedy Ann and Andy
- The Adventures of Rocky and Bullwinkle
- The Adventures of Rupert Bear
- The Adventures of Sam
- The Adventures of Scrapiron O'Toole
- The Adventures of Skippy
- Adventures of Sonic the Hedgehog
- The Adventures of Super Mario Bros. 3
- The Adventures of Teddy Ruxpin
- The Adventures of Tintin
- Adventures on Kythera
- Adventure Time
- Against the Odds
- Agent Z and the Penguin from Mars
- Aladdin
- Albie
- Alias the Jester
- Alien's First Christmas
- Ali and the Camel
- Alligator Pie
- All Change
- All Dogs Go to Heaven: The Series
- All Grown Up!
- All for One
- The All-New Pink Panther Show
- The All-New Popeye Show
- Alvin and the Chipmunks
- The Amazing Adrenalini Brothers
- Amigo and Friends
- Andrew's Ark
- Andy Pandy
- Angelina Ballerina
- The Angry Beavers
- Animal Alphabet
- Animal Ark
- Animal Park
- Animal Spies!
- The Animal Shelf
- Animated Hero Classics
- Animated Tales of the World
- Animorphs
- Anthony Ant
- Aquila
- Are You Afraid of the Dark?
- ARK, the Adventures of Animal Rescue Kids
- Around the World in 80 Days
- Around the World with Willy Fog
- As Told by Ginger
- Astro Boy (2003 series)
- Atomic Betty
- Atom Ant
- The Avengers: United They Stand
- A.J.'s Time Travelers
- The Babaloos
- Babar
- Babar and Father Christmas
- Baby Bollies
- Back to the Future
- Bananas in Pyjamas (Original series)
- Barriers
- Barney & Friends
- The Basil Brush Show
- Batman Beyond
- Batman: The Animated Series
- Bay City
- Bear in the Big Blue House
- The Bear's Island
- The Bears Who Saved Christmas
- Beethoven
- Beetlejuice
- The Berenstain Bears
- Bernard's Watch
- The Bellflower Bunnies
- Beyblade
- Beyond the Break
- The BFG
- Big Cook, Little Cook
- Big Guy and Rusty the Boy Robot
- Big Kids
- Biker Mice from Mars (1993 series)
- Biker Mice from Mars (2006 series)
- Bill and Ben
- Bimble's Bucket
- Binka
- The Biskitts
- The Biz
- Black Beauty
- The Blobs
- Blue Peter Special Assignment
- Blue Water High
- Bluetoes the Christmas Elf
- Bob Morane
- Bob the Builder (Original series)
- Bobobobs
- Bonkers
- Boo!
- Boo to You Too! Winnie the Pooh
- Boohbah
- Bouli
- The Box of Delights
- The Boy from Andromeda
- The Boy with Two Heads
- Braceface
- Brambly Hedge
- Brand Spankin' New! Doug
- BraveStarr
- Breaker High
- Breakpoint
- Brendon Chase
- Bright Sparks
- The Brollys
- Broomstick Cottage
- Brown Bear's Wedding
- Brum
- Bruno the Kid
- Budgie the Little Helicopter
- The Bugs Bunny Show
- Bugs Bunny's Howl-oween Special
- Bugs Bunny's Looney Christmas Tales
- Bugs Bunny's Mad World of Television
- Bugs Bunny's Wild World of Sports
- Bugs vs. Daffy: Battle of the Music Video Stars
- Bump
- Bump in the Night
- A Bunch of Munsch
- Bunnicula
- Bushfire Moon
- Busytown Mysteries
- Butterfly Island
- Brandy & Mr. Whiskers
- Bratz
- Brothers by Choice
- Brown Bear's Wedding
- Bruno the Kid
- Bugtime Adventures
- The Buzz on Maggie
- Buzz Lightyear of Star Command
- Byker Grove
- C Bear and Jamal
- Cadillacs and Dinosaurs
- Caillou
- The California Raisin Show
- Captain Cook's Travels
- Captain Fracasse
- Captain Planet and the Planeteers
- Captain Scarlet and the Mysterons
- Captain Simian and the Space Monkeys
- Captain Zed and the Zee Zone
- Cardcaptors
- Care Bears
- Casper and the Angels
- Casper and Friends
- Casper Classics
- Casper the Friendly Ghost
- Casper's First Christmas
- The Castle of Adventure
- CatDog
- Catscratch
- Catweazle
- Cave Kids
- CBS Schoolbreak Special
- CBS Storybreak
- ChalkZone
- Charlie Chalk
- Chick, Chick, Chick
- The Chiffy Kids
- Children of Fire Mountain
- Children's Island
- Children's Ward
- The Chimpmates
- Chip 'n Dale: Rescue Rangers
- The Chipmunks Go to the Movies
- Chocky
- Christopher the Christmas Tree
- Chris Cross
- Christmas Everyday
- The Christmas Star
- A Christmas Story
- The Christmas Toy
- The Christmas Visitor
- The Chronicles of Narnia
- The Chimpmates
- Chucklewood Critters
- City Tails
- Clarissa Explains It All
- Classic Fairy Tales
- Class of the Titans
- Close Up
- Clowning Around
- Cockleshell Bay
- Codename Icarus
- Come Outside
- A Connecticut Rabbit in King Arthur's Court
- Construction Site
- Cooking for Kids with Luis
- Cool McCool
- The Coral Island
- Corneil & Bernie
- Cornflakes for Tea
- A Cosmic Christmas
- Courage the Cowardly Dog
- Count Duckula
- The Country Mouse and the City Mouse Adventures
- Cow and Chicken
- The Crayon Box
- Crayon Shin-Chan
- Creepy Crawlers
- Cro
- Curious George
- Cyborg 009
- Daffy Duck in Hollywood
- Dastardly and Muttley in Their Flying Machines
- David and the Gnomes
- David and the Magic Pearl
- Defenders of the Earth
- The Demon Headmaster
- Dennis the Menace and Gnasher
- Degrassi Junior High
- Detective Bogey
- Detention
- Dexter's Laboratory
- Diabolik
- Dig and Dug
- Digimon
- Dink, the Little Dinosaur
- Dinky Dog
- Dinky Winky Circus
- Dinobabies
- Dinozaurs
- Dirty Beasts
- Dirty Rat Tales
- Disney's Adventures of the Gummi Bears
- Disney's House of Mouse
- Doctor Dolittle
- Doctor Snuggles
- Dog and Cat
- Dog City
- Dogtanian and the Three Muskehounds
- Dogstar
- Donald's Quack Attack
- Don't Eat the Neighbours
- The Doombolt Chase
- Dot and Spot's Magical Christmas Adventure
- The Dot and the Kangaroo Films
- Doug
- Dr. Seuss on the Loose
- Dramarama
- Dragon's Lair
- The Dreamstone
- Droopy
- Droopy, Master Detective
- DuckTales (Original series)
- Earthwatch
- Earthworm Jim
- Ed, Edd n Eddy
- Eddy and the Bear
- The Edison Twins
- Edward and Friends
- Eerie, Indiana: The Other Dimension
- Elephant Boy
- The Elephant Show
- Elmo Saves Christmas
- Emlyn's Moon
- Enchanted Tales
- The Enid Blyton Adventure Series
- Enid Blyton's Enchanted Lands
- Enid Blyton's Secret Series
- Erky Perky
- Escape from Jupiter
- Extreme Dinosaurs
- Extreme Ghostbusters
- The Fabulous Fleischer Folio
- Faireez
- The Fairly OddParents!
- The Fairytaler
- Family Dog
- The Famous Five (1978 series)
- The Famous Five (1995 series)
- Fantaghirò
- The Fantastic Adventures of the Ugly Duckling
- Fantastic Four (1978 series)
- The Fantastic Voyages of Sinbad the Sailor
- Fantomcat
- Father Christmas and the Missing Reindeer
- Fennec
- Fergus McPhail
- Ferry Boat Fred
- Fetch the Vet
- Fiddley Foodle Bird
- Fievel's American Tails
- Fillmore!
- Fireman Sam (Original series)
- Fireman Sam: Snow Business
- Five Children and It
- The Flaxton Boys
- Flight 29 Down
- A Flintstone Christmas
- A Flintstone Family Christmas
- The Flintstone Kids
- Foofur
- For Better or For Worse (TV specials)
- The Forgotten Toys
- Fourways Farm
- Foxbusters
- Fox Tales
- Fraidy Cat
- Franklin
- Freakazoid
- Free Willy
- Frog and Toad are Friends
- The Frog Show
- Frosty Returns
- Frosty the Snowman
- The Fruitties
- Fudge
- The Funky Phantom
- Funnybones
- Funny Little Bugs
- Gadget and the Gadgetinis
- Gadget Boy & Heather
- Garfield and Friends
- Gargoyles
- Garth and Bev
- Gather Your Dreams
- The Genie From Down Under
- Gentle Ben
- George and Martha
- George of the Jungle (2007 series)
- George Shrinks
- Gerald McBoing-Boing
- Get Ed
- Ghostwriter
- The Girl from Tomorrow
- The Gingerbread Man
- Gladiator Academy
- The Gnoufs
- Godzilla: The Animated Series
- Goof Troop
- Goosebumps
- Gophers!
- Gordon the Garden Gnome
- Granpa
- Gravity Falls
- The Great Grape Ape
- Grimm's Fairy Tales
- Grizzly Tales for Gruesome Kids
- Groove High
- The Growing Summer
- Grossology
- Halfway Across the Galaxy and Turn Left
- Hamilton the Musical Elephant
- A Handful of Songs
- Happily Ever After: Fairy Tales for Every Child
- The Happy Castle
- Happy Ness: Secret of the Loch
- The Happy Prince
- Harry and His Bucket Full of Dinosaurs
- Harry and the Wrinklies
- Harry's Mad
- The Haunted School
- He-Man and the Masters of the Universe (1983 series)
- Heads and Tails
- Henry's Cat
- Henry's Leg
- Henry's World
- Here's How!
- Hey Arnold!
- High Flyers
- Hilltop Hospital
- Hills End
- Histeria!
- Hobberdy Dick
- Hokey Wolf
- Horrid Henry
- The Hot Rod Dogs and Cool Car Cats
- Hotshotz
- How
- How Bugs Bunny Won the West
- Hoze Houndz
- Huckleberry Hound
- Huntingtower
- Hurricanes
- Hypernauts
- I am Weasel
- If You'd Believe This
- Iggy Arbuckle
- In the Wild with Harry Butler
- The Incredible Detectives
- The Incredible Hulk
- Inspector Gadget
- Inspector Mouse
- Into the Labyrinth
- Inuk
- Iron Nose: The Mysterious Knight
- It's a Big Big World
- It's a Wonderful Tiny Toons Christmas Special
- Ivanhoe
- Iznogoud
- Jackanory Playhouse
- Jackie Chan Adventures
- Jackson Pace: The Great Years
- Jacob Two-Two
- Jakers! The Adventures of Piggley Winks
- James Bond Jr.
- Jason of Star Command
- Jennifer's Journey
- The Jetsons
- Jim Button and Luke the Engine Driver
- Jim Henson's Animal Show
- Jim Henson's Mother Goose Stories
- Joe 90
- Joey and Redhawk
- Johann's Gift to Christmas
- Johnny Bravo
- Johnson and Friends
- Jonny Quest
- Josie Smith
- Joshua Jones
- The Journey of Allen Strange
- Journey to the Center of the Earth
- Jungle Beat
- Junglies
- Juniper Jungle
- Just So Stories
- Just William
- KaBlam!
- Kaboodle
- Kangaroo Creek Gang
- Kelly
- Kenan & Kel
- Ketchup: Cats Who Cook
- Kid Clones from Outer Space
- Kid Paddle
- Kideo
- Kidsongs
- The Kids of Degrassi Street
- The Kids from Room 402
- Kim Possible
- Kipper
- Kit and Kaboodle
- K10C: Kids' Ten Commandments
- The Land Before Time
- Lassie (1954 series)
- Lassie (1997 series)
- Laugh and Learn with Richard Scarry
- Lavender Castle
- The Legend of Prince Valiant
- The Legend of White Fang
- The Legends of Treasure Island
- Lilly the Witch
- The Lionhearts
- Little Bear
- The Little Engine That Could
- The Little Match Girl
- The Little Mermaid
- Little Miss
- Little Monsters
- Little Mouse on the Prairie
- A Little Princess
- Little Red Tractor
- Little Robots
- Little Sir Nicholas
- The Little Troll Prince
- Little Wizards
- Little Zoo
- The Littlest Hobo
- Littlest Pet Shop
- Lizzie's Library
- Lloyd in Space
- The Long Enchantment
- Look Up
- Looney Tunes
- Loopy De Loop
- Los Luchadores
- The Lost World
- LRTV
- Lunar Jim
- L.A. 7
- Madballs
- Madeline
- Madeline in London
- Madeline's Christmas
- McGee and Me!
- Maggie and the Ferocious Beast
- The Magical Adventures of Quasimodo
- The Magician
- The Magic Crown
- Magic Adventures of Mumfie
- The Magic Library
- Magic Mountain
- The Magic Pencil
- The Magic School Bus
- The Magnificent Six and 1/2
- Make Way for Noddy
- Marsupilami
- Martin Mystery
- Marvel Action Hour
- Mary-Kate and Ashley in Action!
- The Mask: Animated Series
- Masked Rider
- Mathematical Eye
- Matilda's Dream
- Max and Moritz
- Max & Ruby
- Max Steel
- Maya the Bee
- Medabots
- Mega Man
- Men in Black: The Series
- Mental Block
- Merlin the Magical Puppy
- Mermaid Melody Pichi Pichi Pitch
- Merrie Melodies
- A Merry Mirthworm Christmas
- Metalheads
- Miami 7
- Microsoap
- Middle English
- Mighty Ducks
- Mighty Max
- Mighty Morphin Power Rangers
- Mighty Mouse: The New Adventures
- Mighty Mouse and Friends
- Mike and Angelo
- Mike, Lu & Og
- Mirror, Mirror
- Mirror, Mirror II
- Miss BG
- Mission Top Secret
- Mole's Christmas
- Mona the Vampire
- Monchhichis
- Monster Buster Club
- A Monster Christmas
- Monster Warriors
- Monty
- Moomin
- Moonacre
- Moondial
- The Moonkys
- The Moon Stallion
- Mopatop's Shop
- Mort & Phil
- Mouse and Mole
- A Mouse, a Mystery and Me
- Mowgli: The New Adventures of the Jungle Book
- The Mozart Band
- Mr. Magoo
- Mr Majeika
- Mr Men
- Mr Men and Little Miss
- Mr. T
- Mr Wymi
- Mumble Bumble
- Mummies Alive!
- Mummy Nanny
- Muppet Babies
- Muzzy in Gondoland
- The Mysterious Cities of Gold
- The Mystic Knights of Tir Na NOg
- My Gym Partner's a Monkey
- My Little Prince
- My Zoo
- M*U*S*H
- NASCAR Racers
- Naturally, Sadie
- Ned's Newt
- The Neverending Story
- The New Adventures of Flash Gordon
- The New Adventures of Captain Planet
- The New Adventures of Madeline
- The New Adventures of Mother Goose
- The New Adventures of Ocean Girl
- The New Adventures of the Shoe People
- The New Adventures of Speed Racer
- The New Adventures of Winnie the Pooh
- The New Adventures of Zorro (1981 series)
- The New Adventures of Zorro (1997 series)
- The New Batman Adventures
- The New Lassie
- The New Pink Panther Show
- The New Scooby-Doo Movies
- The New Scooby-Doo Mysteries
- The New Fred and Barney Show
- The New Woody Woodpecker Show
- The New World of the Gnomes
- The New Worst Witch
- The New Yogi Bear Show
- Newton's Apple
- The Nightingale
- Nilus the Sandman
- Ninja Turtles: The Next Mutation
- Noah's Island
- Nobody's House
- Noddy
- Noddy's Toyland Adventures
- No Sweat
- O Christmas Tree
- Oakie Doke
- Ocean Girl
- Oceans Alive!
- The Odyssey
- On Christmas Eve
- Once Upon a Time... Life
- Once Upon a Time... Space
- Once Upon a Time... The Americas
- Once Upon a Time... The Discoverers
- Once Upon a Time... The Explorers
- Orson and Olivia
- Oscar and Friends
- Oscar's Orchestra
- Ovide Video
- The Owl Service
- OWL/TV
- The Ozlets
- Pals
- Papa Beaver's Storytime
- Papyrus
- Paw Paws
- PB&J Otter
- Pecola
- Peep and the Big Wide World
- Pelswick
- Pepper Ann
- Percy the Park Keeper
- The Perils of Penelope Pitstop
- Peter Swift and the Little Circus
- Phantom 2040
- Phil of the Future
- The Phoenix and the Carpet (1997 series)
- Picme
- Pig's Breakfast
- The Pilis
- The Pillow People Save Christmas
- Pingu
- The Pink Panther and Friends
- Pink Panther and Sons
- The Pink Panther Show
- Pinky, Elmyra and the Brain
- Pinocchio's Christmas
- Pip the Appleseed Knight
- Pippi Longstocking
- Pirate Family
- The Pirates of Dark Water
- Pitfall!
- Pitt & Kantrop
- Pixie and Dixie and Mr. Jinks
- Planet Sketch
- Pocket Dragon Adventures
- The Poky Little Puppy's First Christmas
- Polka Dot Shorts
- Pop Pirates
- Popeye and Friends
- Popeye and Son
- Postman Pat (Original series)
- Postman Pat and the Toy Soldiers
- Postman Pat Takes the Bus
- Potamus Park
- Potsworth & Co
- Power Rangers Dino Thunder
- Power Rangers in Space
- Power Rangers Lightspeed Rescue
- Power Rangers Lost Galaxy
- Power Rangers Mystic Force
- Power Rangers Time Force
- Power Rangers Wild Force
- The Powerpuff Girls
- Press Gang
- Preston Pig
- Prince of Atlantis
- The Princess and the Flying Shoemaker
- Princess Sissi
- Puff the Magic Dragon
- Puff the Magic Dragon in the Land of the Living Lies
- Pugwall
- Pugwall's Summer
- Punkin' Puss & Mushmouse
- A Pup Named Scooby-Doo
- The Puppy's Further Adventures
- P.J.'s Unfunnybunny Christmas
- Quack Pack
- The Queen's Nose
- Quick Draw McGraw
- The Raccoons
- The Raccoons on Ice
- Radio Free Roscoe
- Ramona
- Rarg
- Rat-a-Tat-Tat
- The Real Adventures of Jonny Quest
- The Real Ghostbusters
- The Real Story of...
- ReBoot
- Recess
- The Red and the Blue
- Redbeard the Pirate
- Redwall
- Regular Show
- Renford Rejects
- Rescue Heroes
- The Return of Dogtanian
- Return of the Antelope
- Return to Jupiter
- Ric the Raven
- The Riddlers
- River Rivals
- Road Rovers
- The Road Runner Show
- Road to Avonlea
- RoboCop: Alpha Commando
- Rocket Power
- Rocky Hollow
- Roger and the Rottentrolls
- Rolie Polie Olie
- The Roly Mo Show
- Romie-0 and Julie-8
- Romuald the Reindeer
- Roobarb and Custard Too
- Rosie and Jim
- Rotten Ralph
- Round the Bend
- Round the Twist
- Ruby & The Rockits
- Ruby Gloom
- Rudolph and Frosty's Christmas in July
- Rudolph the Red-Nosed Reindeer
- Rugrats
- Runaway Bay
- Rupert
- S Club 7 Go Wild!
- Saban's Adventures of Oliver Twist
- Saber Rider and the Star Sheriffs
- Sabrina: The Animated Series
- Sailor Moon
- Samson Superslug
- Sandokan
- Santa and the Tooth Fairies
- Santa Claus Is Comin' to Town
- Santa's First Christmas
- Santo Bugito
- Sara (1996 series)
- The Save-Ums!
- The Scientific Eye
- Scooby-Doo
- Scooby and Scrappy-Doo
- Scooby, Scrappy and Yabba-Doo
- Scrooge Koala's Christmas
- Scruff
- Seabert
- The Second Voyage of the Mimi
- The Secret Garden (TV series)
- The Secret Garden (1987 film)
- The Secret Lives of Waldo Kitty
- The Secret Show
- The Secret of the Stone
- Secret Valley
- The Secret World of Alex Mack
- The Secret World of Santa Claus
- Sergeant Stripes
- Sesame Street
- Sesame Street Celebrates Around the World
- Sesame Street Jam: A Musical Celebration
- Sharky & George
- Sheeep
- Sheep in the Big City
- She-Ra: Princess of Power
- Shining Time Station: 'Tis a Gift
- Shinzo
- Ship to Shore
- Shoebox Zoo
- The Shnookums and Meat Funny Cartoon Show
- Shuriken School
- The Silver Brumby
- Silver Surfer
- Simba: The King Lion
- Simon and the Witch
- Simsala Grimm
- Skippy: Adventures in Bushtown
- Skippy the Bush Kangaroo
- Sky Trackers
- Slimer! And the Real Ghostbusters
- The Small One
- The Smoggies
- The Smurfs
- Snailsbury Tales
- The Sniffing Bear
- Sniffles
- Snooper and Blabber
- Snorks
- The Snow Spider
- The Snowman
- Son of the Sahara
- Sonic the Hedgehog
- Sonic X
- Spartakus and the Sun Beneath the Sea
- Speed Racer
- Spellbinder
- Spellbinder: Land of the Dragon Lord
- Spider-Man (1994 series)
- Splash
- Splash Special
- The Spooktacular New Adventures of Casper
- Sport Billy
- Sport Goofy in Soccermania
- Spot
- Spot's Magical Christmas
- Spunky's First Christmas
- Steel Riders
- Stingray (1964 series)
- Storybook International
- Storybook World
- The Story of Santa Claus
- The Story of Tracy Beaker
- The Story Store
- Strangers
- Street Sharks
- The Suite Life of Zack & Cody
- Super Duper Sumos
- The Super Mario Bros. Super Show!
- Super Mario World
- Superman (1988 series)
- Superman: The Animated Series
- SuperTed
- Swamp Thing
- Sweat
- T-Bag
- Take Me Up to the Ball Game
- The Tales of Beatrix Potter
- Tales from the Rubbish Dump
- Teddy Bear's Adventures
- Teen Titans
- Teenage Mutant Hero Turtles (1987 series)
- Teenage Mutant Hero Turtles (2003 series)
- Teletubbies
- Tell Me a Story
- Thomas the Tank Engine and Friends (original series)
- The Three Fishketeers
- Three Little Tramps
- Thunderbirds
- Thunderbirds 2086
- Thunderstone
- The Tick
- The Timberwood Tales
- Timbuctoo
- Time Riders
- Tiny Toon Adventures
- Titch
- Toad Patrol
- The Tofus
- Tom and Jerry
- The Tomorrow People (1992 series)
- Toonsylvania
- The Toothbrush Family
- Top Cat
- Tots TV
- Tottie: The Story of a Doll's House
- Toucan Tecs
- Touché Turtle and Dum Dum
- The Town That Santa Forgot
- Tracey McBean
- Tractor Tom
- Transformers: Armada
- Transformers: Cybertron
- Transformers: Energon
- Treasure in Malta
- The Treasure Seekers
- Tricks of Brer Rabbit
- The Tribe
- The Trouble with 2B
- The Trouble with Sophie
- Truckers
- The True Meaning of Crumbfest
- True Tilda
- Tugs
- Tukiki and His Search for a Merry Christmas
- Tutenstein
- Tweenies
- The Twisted Tales of Felix the Cat
- 'Twas the Night Before Christmas (1974 special)
- Ultraforce
- Ulysses 31
- The Unbroken Arrow
- Unfabulous
- The Untouchables of Elliot Mouse
- A Valentine for You
- Valley of the Dinosaurs
- Victor and Hugo
- The Village by the Sea
- Wacky and Packy
- Wacky Races
- Walter Melon
- Watership Down
- Waynehead
- The Wayne Manifesto
- We All Have Tales
- We Wish You a Merry Christmas
- What-a-Mess
- What's New Mr. Magoo?
- What's with Andy?
- Where's Wally?: The Animated Series
- When I Grow Up
- Wicked
- Widget
- The Wiggles
- Wil Cwac Cwac
- The Wild Puffalumps
- The Wild Thornberrys
- Wild West C.O.W.-Boys of Moo Mesa
- Wildfire
- William's Wish Wellingtons
- Willy Fog 2
- The Wind in the Willows
- Winners
- Wisdom of the Gnomes
- Wishbone
- The Wish That Changed Christmas
- The Wizard of Oz
- Wizards of Waverly Place
- Wizbit
- The Wombles
- Wonderstruck
- Woof!
- Words and Pictures
- The World of David the Gnome
- The World of Peter Rabbit and Friends
- The Worst Witch
- Worzel Gummidge
- Worzel Gummidge Down Under
- The WotWots
- The Wubbulous World of Dr. Seuss
- The Wuzzles
- Xyber 9: New Dawn
- X-Men
- X-Men: Evolution
- The X's
- Yakkity Yak
- Yes, Virginia, there is a Santa Claus
- Yolanda, the Black Corsair's Daughter
- Yogi Bear
- Young Dracula
- Yoho Ahoy
- Young Sherlock: The Mystery of the Manor House
- The Zack Files
- The Zeta Project
- Ziggy's Gift
- Zoe Kezako
- Zoey 101
- Zoo Family
- Zoom the White Dolphin

== Sport ==
- Olympic Games
- FIFA World Cup
- UEFA European Football Championship
- FIFA Confederations Cup
- UEFA Champions League
- Six Nations Championship
- League of Ireland Premier Division
