= Kominsky =

Kominsky is a surname. Notable people with the surname include:

- Morris Kominsky (1901–1975), American writer and former communist
- Nancy Kominsky (1915–2011), Italian-American artist
