= Living with Lions =

Living with Lions may refer to:

- Living with Lions (film), 1997 documentary
- Living with Lions (band)
