= Abdullah Haron =

South African imam (1924–1969)

- Born: 8 February 1924; Claremont, Cape Town, South Africa
- Disappeared: May 28, 1969 (aged 45); Caledon Square Police Station
- Died: 27 September 1969 (aged 45); Cape Town, South Africa
- Cause of death: Tortured
- Citizenship: South African
- Occupation: Muslim cleric
- Organization(s): Al-Jamia Mosque, Claremont, Cape Town
- Known for: anti-apartheid activist, community leader
- Title: Imam
- Spouse: Galiema Sadan

Abdullah Haron (8 February 1924 – 27 September 1969), also known as Imam Haron, was a South African Muslim cleric and anti-apartheid activist. He is best known for his anti-apartheid activism and subsequent death by the Security Branch of the apartheid-era South African Police Force in 1969. Haron was posthumously awarded the Order of Luthuli in Gold in 2014 for his "exceptional contribution to raising awareness of political injustices".

== Early life and education ==
Haron was born the youngest child from a family of five children. He was raised by his childless aunt on his father's side following his mother's death when he was still an infant. On 15 March 1950 he married Galiema Sadan and the couple later had three children.

After graduating standard 6 from Talfalah Primary School he travelled to Mecca to pursue Islamic studies, where he was taught by Sheikh Alawi al-Maliki. He returned to Cape Town after two years and continued his studies with Sheikh Abdullah Taha Gamieldien and Shaykh Ismail Ganief. He was influenced by the thinking of the Teachers' League of South Africa and the Non-European Unity Movement through family members who were members of the organisations.

== Anti-apartheid activities ==
He was made the Imam of the Al-Jamia Mosque in Claremont, Cape Town in 1955 where he set up discussion groups and engaged in anti-apartheid activities. In 1958 he established the Claremont Muslim Youth Association and went on to establish the community newspaper Muslim News (1960-1986). In the 1960s Haron met Pan African Congress (PAC) member and activist Barney Desai through whom he first contacted the PAC. In 1965 he was affected by the Group Areas Act and was forced to move from his family home on Jefferson Road, Lansdowne to Repulse Road in the demarcated Coloured neighbourhood of Athlone. Haron gave a number of speeches and sermons against apartheid policies and laws including a notable speech at the Cape Town Drill Hall on 7 May 1961 where he described the Group Areas Act as "inhuman, barbaric and un-Islamic".

In 1968 he travelled to Mecca where he met King Faisal of Saudi Arabia and Saudi Minister of Education Hasan `Abdullah `Ali Shaykh to discuss educational issues. He then went on to Cairo where he met PAC members and address a conference of Muslim representatives that was also attended by the PAC and African National Congress. He then went on to London via the Netherlands, where he met with the director of the International University Exchange Fund, Lars Gunner Erickson. While abroad he was informed that he had become a target of the South African Security Branch and was advised to emigrate. He returned to Cape Town due to concerns for his father's ill health, after his application to emigrate to Canada was rejected.

== Death ==
Haron was arrested shortly after his return to Cape Town when he was summoned to the Security Branch office at the Caledon Square Police Station (now Cape Town Central Police Station) on 28 May 1969. He was detained by police Special Branch member Spyker van Wyk and held in solitary confinement for 123 days, with daily interrogations about his involvement in the struggle. During this period United Party MP Catherine Taylor issued an official request for information into the reason for Haron's detention. The Minister of police stated that giving such information "was not in the public interest".

In the morning of 27 September 1969 he died. The official government inquest, revealing that he had sustained two broken ribs and 27 bruises, into his death ruled that he died from falling down a flight of stairs. Haron's family and attorney argued that he had "died as a result of a heart attack which was triggered off by trauma".

On 29 September, his funeral was attended by 40,000 mourners, with his coffin carried about 10 kilometres (6.2 mi) to its final resting place in the Muslim cemetery in Mowbray. On the night of his funeral, the most destructive earthquake in the recorded history of South Africa struck, with its epicentre at Tulbagh in the Western Cape.

== Aftermath, legacy and significance ==
Haron was the first cleric of any faith to die in custody under the apartheid regime. On 6 October 1969, Haron was the first Muslim commemorated in St Paul's Cathedral in London. His friend, Canon John Collins, spoke of him as a martyr.

Haron was posthumously awarded the Order of Luthuli in Gold in 2014 for his "exceptional contribution to raising awareness of political injustices".

After his 93-year-old widow, Galiema, died on the 50th anniversary of her husband's funeral on 29 September 2019, the imam's family demanded a fresh inquest into the cause of his death.

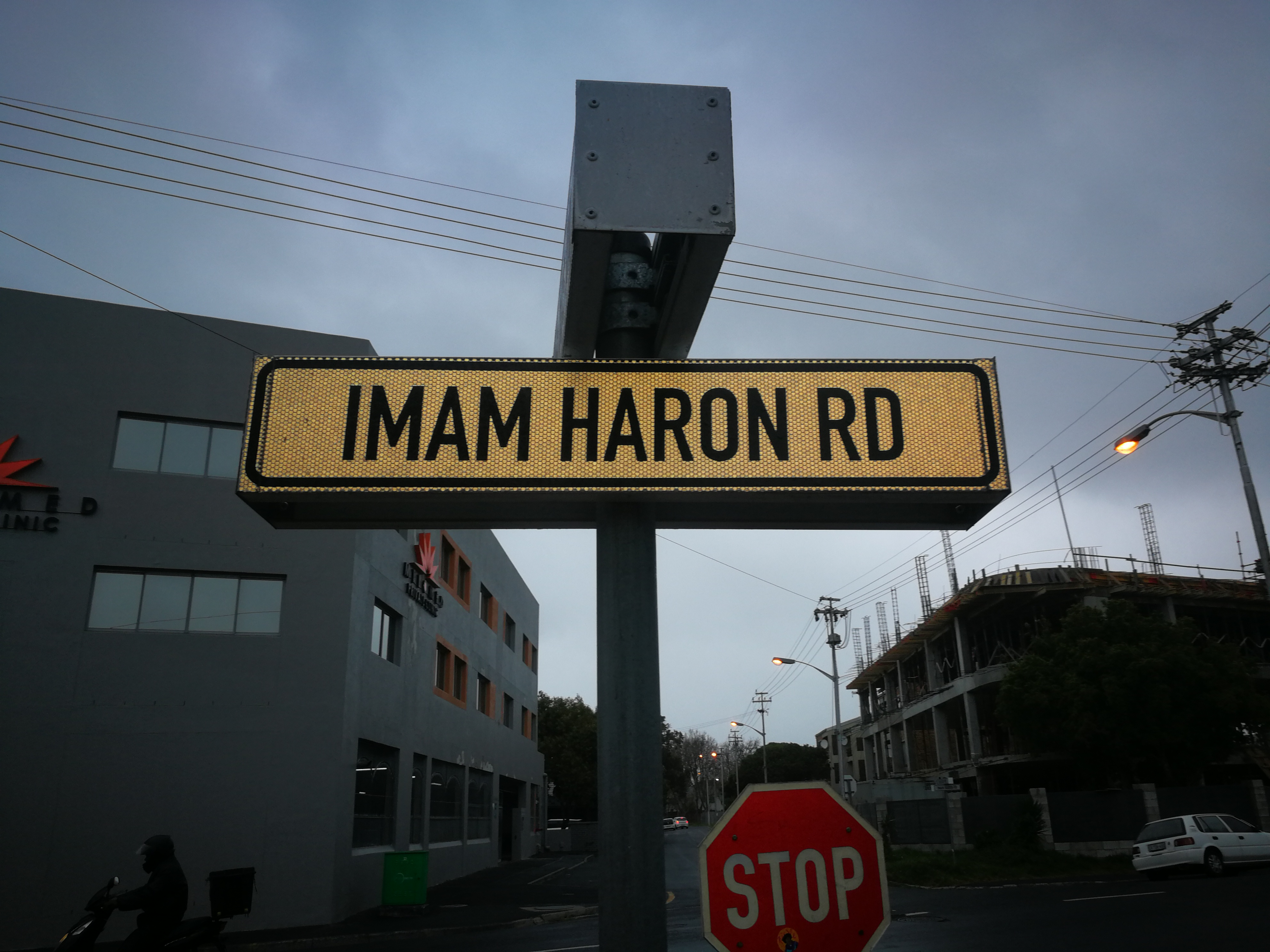
Lansdowne Road, Cape Town, has from Turfhall to Palmyra roads it is now Imam Haron Road

Visual artist Haroon Gunn-Salie has created several works as memorials to Haron, including the 2019 installation "Crying for Justice" in the grounds of the Castle of Good Hope, symbolising 118 unmarked graves, one for each person who died in detention during apartheid years.

Western Cape High Court Judge Daniel Thulare on 9 October 2023 handed down his judgment in the reopened inquest into Haron’s death. Judge Thulare said, “The Security Branch of the South African Police are held responsible for the acts and omissions leading directly to the death of Imam Abdullah Haron.”

A documentary about Haron's final years, The Imam and I, was created by his grandson, Khalid Shamis in 2011.
