= Shinsuke Chikaishi =

Japanese actor (1931–2022)

- 近石 真介
- Born: Yasuzō Chikaishi (近石 安蔵); January 20, 1931; Toyotama District, Tokyo Prefecture, Japan
- Died: October 5, 2022 (aged 91); Tokyo Metropolis, Japan
- Occupations: Actor; voice actor; narrator
- Years active: 1950–2020
- Agent: Mouvement
- Notable credit: Sazae-san as Masuo Fuguta
- Spouse: 1
- Children: Masato Hijikata (born 1960)
- Website: Official profile

Shinsuke Chikaishi (近石 真介, Chikaishi Shinsuke; born Yasuzō Chikaishi (近石 安蔵, Chikaishi Yasuzō), January 20, 1931 – October 5, 2022) was a Japanese actor.

== Biography ==
Chikaishi was born in Toyotama District, Tokyo Prefecture on January 20, 1931.

After graduating from Nihon University Second High School, he entered the Department of Russian Literature at Waseda University, but left after two years.

After dropping out of university, Chikaishi was hired by Mitsui Marine and Fire Insurance Co. thanks to his ability to use a typewriter in Russian and arrangements made by his high school mentor. He joined the company's theater club because he had a crush on a female colleague from another department who was a member, thinking that it would be a good way to get to know her. Later, as a result of acting as her co-star, he became deeply engrossed in the play, and the production went on to win the Award of Excellence at a workplace theater competition in Tokyo. One of the judges at the competition was Motoo Hatta, who later became his mentor. At his recommendation, Chikaishi began to attend the night classes at the Motoo Hatta Acting Research Institute and subsequently left his day job to become a full-time actor when the institute was reorganized into a theater company, making his stage debut in Rekitei.

He got into the voice acting industry because he had gotten married and his wife had become pregnant, which made him realize he had to do something. He jumped at the opportunity because it was television work that paid a flat rate per episode, even though the pay was quite low.

He provided the Japanese dubbing voice for actors such as James Cagney, Jerry Lewis, and Jackie Cooper in foreign films. In anime, he served as the original voice actor of Masuo Fuguta in Sazae-san from the show's start in October 1969 to June 1978 and also served as the original narrator of Old Enough! for a very long time.

Chikaishi gained widespread popularity as a radio personality through Hello, I'm Shinsuke Chikaishi, which debuted on October 4, 1971, and earned him the prestigious Galaxy Award NPO Foundation for the Study of Broadcast Criticism. Due to his advanced age, he continued working until September 25, 2020, when the radio program Hello via Postcard—which began during the era of Hello, I'm Shinsuke Chikaishi and ran for 49 years—had came to an end. Consequently, this ended up becoming his final job.

After working at the Enshigekijo (Performing Theater), he participated in the founding of the theater group Gekidan 3-no-Kai in 1957. He joined the Engeki-za theater company in 1958, participated in the founding of the Seien Theater Company in 1961, and was a member of the theater company Gekidan Toen (formerly Tokyo Engeki Seminar) from December 1962 to 2002.

Throughout his career, Chikaishi was managed by the Tokyo Actor's Consumer's Cooperative Society, then Parata Project, and Mouvement.

=== Death ===
Chikaishi died at his home of senility on October 5, 2022, at the age of 91.

== Personal life ==
Active since the early days of television, Chikaishi focused primarily on stage performances as an actor, while also making appearances in television dramas.

=== Features and hobbies ===
His voice range was baritone.

His hobbies included rakugo, fishing, and horseback riding. He was also really into making his own miso. Particularly when it came to rakugo, he was skilled enough to perform on-stage under the name of "Gyorometei Shinsho".

== Filmography ==
=== Television animation ===
List of voice performances in television animation
Year	Title	Role(s)	Notes	Source
1964	Wolf Boy Ken	Additional voice		
1965	Uchuu Patrol Hopper	Donkey		
1965	The Amazing 3	Puukko		
1966	Osomatsu-kun	Additional voice		
1966	Astro Boy	Additional voice		
1967	Kaminari Boy Pikkaribee	005emon		
1967	Gokū no Daibōken	Narrator, Plankton Leader, Shakyamuni Buddha		
1967	Tom of T.H.U.M.B.	Tom	Lead role	
1968	Sasuke	Saizō Kirigakure		
1969–1970	Marine Boy	Moderator, Section Chief, Engineer A		
1969–1978	Sazae-san	Masuo Fuguta	First voice	
1969	Sabu to Ichi Torimono Hikae	Gorōta, Genma		
1970	Kirin Monoshiri Daigaku Manga Jinbutsu Shi	Dr. Fun		
1971	Tensai Bakabon	Additional voice		
1971	Andersen Stories	Big Claus	Ep. 41	
1972	New Moomin	Tapir	Ep. 1	
2003	KochiKame: Tokyo Beat Cops	Daisaku Omagari		
2004	Monster	Old Man in the Forest	Ep. 32	

=== Theatrical animation ===
List of voice performances in theatrical animation
Year	Title	Role	Notes	Source
1987	Aitsu to Lullaby: Suiyobi no Cinderella	Tetsuhiko Sugimoto		
1991	Roujin Z	Yoshihiko Hasegawa		
2015	The Boy and the Beast	Sage		

=== Original video animation (OVA) ===
List of voice performances in original video animation
Year	Title	Role	Notes	Source
1966	Princess Knight	Garigori	Pilot episode	
1969	Lupin the Third: Pilot Film	Inspector Zenigata	CinemaScope version	
1995	Super Atragon	Kōtarō Nishimura		
