= The Killing of the Imam =

- Directed by: Khalid Shamis
- Screenplay by: Khalid Shamis
- Produced by: Tubafilms
- Cinematography: Khalid Shamis
- Edited by: Khalid Shamis
- Music by: Mark Roberts
- Release date: 2010
- Running time: 10 minutes
- Country: South Africa

The Killing of the Imam is a 2010 South African short documentary film. The film is also known under the title The Imam and I.

== Synopsis ==
In 1969, Imam Abdullah Haron was incarcerated and killed in detention in Cape Town, South Africa. A much loved community leader, he was active within an inactive community in raising awareness of the plight of his compatriots living under apartheid. During the 60s, Imam Haron became more active and began travelling abroad to raise funds for impoverished families back home. Mixing animation, documentary and stock footage, this short film looks at the last few years of the Imam's life and death. It is told by his grandson, the filmmaker Khalid Shamis, through the eyes of a child.

== Awards ==
- SAFTA 2011
