= Professor Moffett's Science Workshop =

Canadian 1970s children's science television program

- Genre: children's science
- Presented by: Maxwell G. Moffett
- Starring: Claire Anne Bundy; Stuart Bundy
- Country of origin: Canada
- Original language: English
- No. of seasons: 2

Production
- Running time: 30 minutes
- Production companies: Mediavision; Durelle Productions

Original release
- Network: CBC Television
- Release: 11 September 1972 – 4 March 1974

Professor Moffett's Science Workshop is a Canadian children's science television program that aired on CBC Television from 1972 to 1974.

== Premise ==
Scientific topics such as aeronautics, astronomy, biology, geology, optics and thermodynamics were geared towards an audience between ages nine and fourteen. British designer, engineer and professor Maxwell G. Moffett demonstrated these principles with basic items such as bells, bottles and cans. Moffett hosted this program with assistance from young siblings Claire Anne Bundy and Stuart Bundy.

== Scheduling ==
This half-hour program was broadcast Mondays at 5:00 p.m. (Eastern) in two seasons from 11 September 1972 to 19 March 1973 and from 10 September 1973 to 4 March 1974.
