= Ancient Warriors =

- Genre: History
- Directed by: Phil Grabsky
- Country of origin: United States
- Original language: English
- No. of episodes: 20

Production
- Production company: Seventh Art Productions

Original release
- Network: Discovery Channel
- Release: April 17, 1994 – June 11, 1995

Ancient Warriors is a 1994 20-part documentary series from the Discovery Channel.

== Overview ==
Each 30 minute episode looks at a major fighting people or force and charts the reasons for their rise to dominance and subsequent fall. The show explores the motivations of ancient soldiers, as well as how they lived, fought, trained, died, and changed their world. It also uses re-enactments and computer graphics to demonstrate tactics and military strategy.

== Episodes ==
The shows were aired as "three series" over a one-year period, from April 1994 to June 1995.

No.	Title	Original release date
1	"The Assyrians: Masters of War"	April 17, 1994
Observing the 8th-century B.C. Assyrians, whose success at warfare created the largest empire to date, stretching from the Persian Gulf to the Mediterranean.
2	"The Celts"	April 24, 1994
3	"The Normans"	May 1, 1995
4	"The Legions of Rome"	May 8, 1994
5	"The Macedonians"	May 15, 1994
6	"Soldiers of the Pharaoh"	May 22, 1994
7	"The Spartans"	May 29, 1994
8	"The Janissaries: An Army of Slaves"	September 11, 1994
9	"The Huns"	September 18, 1994
10	"The Knights Templar"	September 25, 1994
11	"The Vikings"	October 2, 1994
12	"The Highlanders"	October 9, 1995
13	"The Irish: Warriors of the Emerald Isle"	October 16, 1995
14	"The Maurya: Warriors of the Elephant"	October 23, 1995
15	"The Aztecs"	May 7, 1994
16	"The Samurai"	May 14, 1994
17	"The Shaolin: Masters of Kung Fu"	May 21, 1994
18	"The Hawaiians: Warriors of Paradise"	May 28, 1995
19	"The Ninja: Warriors of the Night"	June 4, 1995
20	"The Sioux: Warriors of the Plains"	June 11, 1995
Special	"The Zulu"	TBA
Special	"The Romans"	TBA

== Home media ==
A DVD set of the three series was released in October 2002. Each Volume contains two discs.

- Volume I - Episodes 1–7
- Volume II - Episodes 8–14
- Volume III - Episodes 15–20

=== Details ===
- Release Date: October 8, 2002
- Format: Color, NTSC
- Language: English
- Region: Region 1 (U.S. and Canada only.)
- Aspect Ratio: 1.33:1
- Number of discs: 2 (per Volume)
- Rated: Not Rated
- Run Time: 197 minutes (Volume 1, Volume 2)
