= Tom of T.H.U.M.B. =

American anime television series

- Also known as: Tom Thumb

Japanese name
- Kanji: キングコング⅐親指トム
Transcriptions
- Revised Hepburn: Kingu Kongu 00 1/7 Oyayubi Tomu
- Genre: Science fiction comedy
- Based on: Tom Thumb by English folklore
- Voices of: Carl Banas; Susan Conway; John Drainie; Billie Mae Richards; Alf Scopp; Paul Soles; Bernard Cowan
- Theme music composer: Maury Laws
- Countries of origin: United States; Canada; Japan
- Original languages: English; Japanese
- No. of seasons: 1
- No. of episodes: 25

Production
- Executive producers: Arthur Rankin Jr. Jules Bass
- Producers: William J. Keenan; Larry Roemer
- Running time: 28 minutes (regular episodes); 56 minutes (special episode)
- Production companies: Videocraft International; Animation: Toei Animation

Original release
- Network: ABC (United States); NET (Japan)
- Release: September 6, 1966 – March 4, 1967

Tom of T.H.U.M.B. (Japanese: 001/7おや指トム, lit. '001/7 Tom's Thumb'). is an American anime-influenced animated series produced by Videocraft International (later Rankin/Bass) of North America, and Toei Animation of Japan. ABC would run the series in the United States on Saturday mornings between September 6, 1966, and March 4, 1967, as it was bundled with The King Kong Show.

In Japan, it was also broadcast with The King Kong Show and was broadcast on NET (currently TV Asahi) from April 5, 1967 to October 4, 1967.

== Synopsis ==
A parody of spy films of the 1960s called Tom of T.H.U.M.B. (based on the character in English folklore 'Tom Thumb'), about a secret agent for T.H.U.M.B. (short for Tiny Human Underground Military Bureau) named Tom and his Asian sidekick Swinging Jack, who are accidentally reduced by a shrinking laser ray gun to 3 in (76 mm) tall. The pair are sent out in a variety of miniature vehicles by their bad-tempered boss Chief Homer J. Chief to foil the fiendish plots of M.A.D. (short for Maladjusted, Anti-social and Darn mean), an evil organization made up of black-hatted and black-cloaked scientists "bent on destroying the world for their own gains".

== Characters ==
Tom (トム)

Voice: Carl Banas, Japanese voice: Shinsuke Chikaishi

Head of T.H.U.M.B., him and Swinging Jack were shrunken.

Swinging Jack (ジャック)

Japanese voice: Shun Yashiro

Tom's Asian sidekick, who was also shrunken.
