= The Desperate Passage Series =

American television series

The Desperate Passage Series is an American television docu-drama series which ran on KTLA with world-wide syndication from 1988 to 1994. The entire series was directed by Lee Stanley and during its six-year run was nominated for thirty-three Emmy Awards and won thirteen statues. The shows often focused on juvenile prisoners who were released into Stanley's custody for ten days at sea aboard his sailboat for the journey of their lives and a voyage viewers would never forget.

Each episode was made for a modest budget, the first for only $25,000 and each one after for less than $200,000. Often Stanley would make the shows with a skeleton crew and modernized the run and gun approach, usually producing with his son Shane Stanley or wife Linda. Regardless of the budgets, each episode except for "A Time for Life" was nominated and won several Emmy Awards against big- budgeted network counterparts.

== Guest Star Hosts ==
Michael Landon, Louis Gossett Jr., Sharon Gless, Marlo Thomas, and Edward James Olmos.

== Series Titles ==
"Desperate Passage", "Maiden Voyage", "A Time for Life", "Gridiron Gang", "Father/Son", "A Step Apart", and "Good Cop, Bad Kid".

== Spin-offs and Cultural References ==
Gridiron Gang was made into a major motion picture for Sony Pictures that starred Dwayne “The Rock” Johnson.

The Comebacks had several quotes and spoofs from Gridiron Gang.

Drug Watch Los Angeles was a quarterly series hosted by Lee Stanley offering an in depth look as a city and its residents crack down on drug dealers and users.

"A Time for Life" was developed into a major motion picture by The Walt Disney Company but never made it to the big screen.
