= Born into Struggle =

Born Into Struggle
- Directed by: Rehad Desai
- Screenplay by: Rehad Desai, Anita Khanna
- Produced by: Uhuru Productions
- Cinematography: Simon Wilkie
- Edited by: Francesco Biagini
- Music by: Phillip Miller
- Release date: 2004
- Running time: 74 minutes
- Country: South Africa

Born Into Struggle is a South African 2004 documentary film.

== Synopsis ==
In this documentary, the filmmaker Rehad Desai takes us on an intimate journey mapped out by the scars etched into his family's life from having a father who was intensely involved in politics. Barney Desai was a political activist during South Africa's struggle for freedom, yet as a father he was absent emotionally. Rehad spent most of his young life in exile and became politically active himself. On this intensely personal journey into his past, Rehad realizes he is following in his fathers footsteps as he reviews his relationship with his own estranged teenage son.

== Festivals ==
The film had its world premiere as a work in progress on 28 April 2004 as part of "Ten Years Of Freedom - Films from the New South Africa," a festival held in New York City.

== Awards ==
- Encounters 2004
- Apollo 2004
- Durban 2004
- World Cinema Festival, Cape Town 2004
- African Film Festival of Cordoba
