= Living with Lions (film) =

- Directed by: Duncan Humphreys; Fred Rees
- Release date: 29 November 1999
- Running time: 167 minutes
- Country: United Kingdom

Living with Lions is a documentary film that was released on video (and later DVD) that follows the 1997 British Lions tour to South Africa.

The film concentrates on the backroom effort, with less attention paid to the on-field rugby. Even when rugby is shown, it is often cut with the reactions of the coaches on the bench and other backroom staff.

The documentary balances pain of various injuries to Rob Howley, Will Greenwood and Doddie Weir, the tensions within the camp (Barry Williams fighting with Mark Regan), the humour of John Bentley's visit to the gym and Keith Wood, and finally jubilation after victory in the second Test.

It is largely concerned with events up to the end of the second Test, with the third Test being dealt with via a textual epilogue. Due to its success, a follow-up documentary Living With The Lions 2 - The Final Week was produced. Both films are included in the DVD.

Wales and Lions player John Taylor was an executive producer on the film.

For the 2001 tour to Australia, another documentary was produced. However, the Lions lost that tour, and there were suggestions that it had been censored to edit out the fact that the players (especially Austin Healey) were displeased with the coach, Graham Henry.

== Reception and impact ==
Leading rugby journalist Owen Slot has said that "No rugby film has ever told the story as well as Living with Lions." Paul O'Connell has said "That video had a huge impact on me. It genuinely made me fall in love with rugby." Both Johnny Sexton and Sam Warburton have said they watched it many multiple times.
