= Nancy Kominsky =

American art teacher and television personality

Nancy Circelli Kominsky
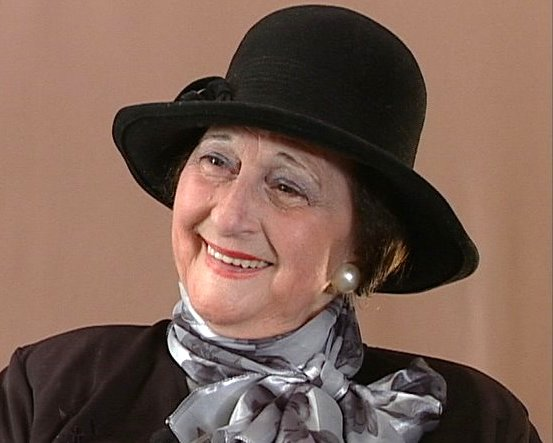
- Nancy Kominsky in 2004
- Born: Emanuela Agneta Circelli; September 24, 1915; Philadelphia, Pennsylvania
- Died: March 11, 2011 (aged 95); London, England
- Known for: Art teacher, television personality
- Website: http://nancykominsky.com/

Nancy Circelli Kominsky (born Emanuella Agneta Circelli, 24 September 1915 – 11 March 2011) was an Italian-American artist and television presenter, who found fame in Britain with her paint-along series in the 1970s.

== Personal life ==
Kominsky met her second husband, Patrick Wodehouse, nephew of PG Wodehouse, when he became one of her pupils in Rome. They were married in 1983. After leaving Italy the couple settled at Wimbledon, London.

Nancy Kominsky was the author of 12 books on painting and pastels along with the autobiography This Is How I Did It - A Self-portrait of Nancy Kominsky. The book was a 2010 prize winner in the Writer's Digest Annual Competition for memoirs.

Kominsky died in London on March 11, 2011, at the age of 95, predeceased by her husband on January 29, 2011, at the age of 90.

== Paint Along TV series ==
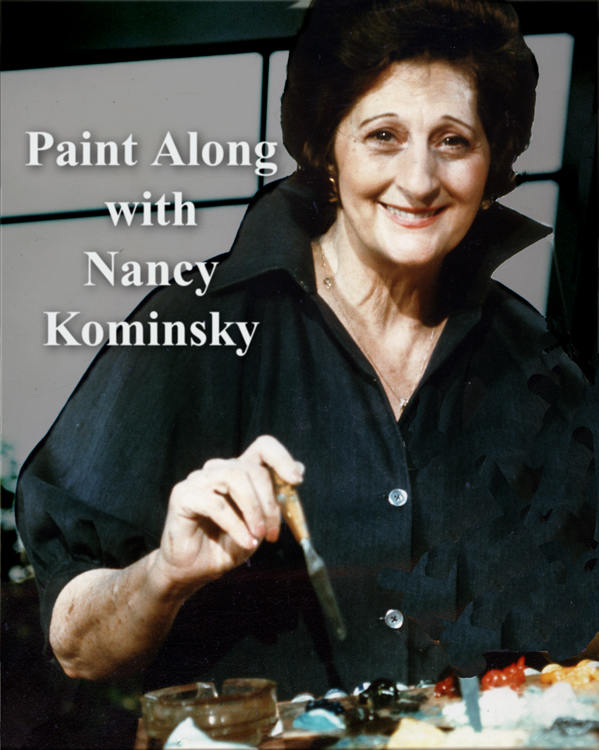

Kominsky's series Paint Along with Nancy comprised 52 half-hour programmes made by HTV West from 1974 to 1978, and transmitted on ITV network in the United Kingdom.

She also made a follow-up series in the US for PBS for a 26 half hour programmes, which ran on PBS affiliates into the mid-1980s, distributed by Connecticut Public Television.

At a film festival in France, a friend introduced Kominsky to the well-known producer Peter Orton, who liked her idea of a television programme aimed at people who wanted to learn how to paint. She began to "commute" between Rome and Bristol, where she made Paint Along With Nancy. Nancy Kominsky's instruction was accompanied by an amusing, unscripted running commentary. To demystify the mixing of colours, she described the process in the manner of recipe directions: "For the background, mix a teaspoonful of orange, half a teaspoon of vermilion and a quarter of purple … ". Demonstrating as she went, she would slash on the colour with a palette knife, and would always finish with a picture that her viewers could copy. The series extended over four years and was shown extensively in several countries.

Her oil painting lessons were followed with enthusiasm by housewives, shift workers, and schoolchildren, many of whom would race home after school to switch on the television set to watch her demonstrate her unusual system of painting.

== Selection of her work ==
Paintings by Nancy Kominsky (oil on canvas—various sizes 1974–1986)

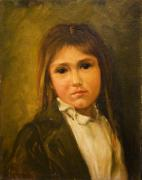
Angelina

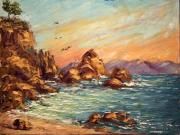
Cypress Point

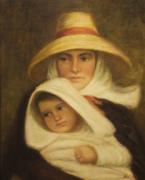
Mother and Child

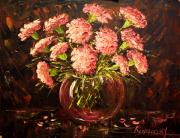
Pink Carnations

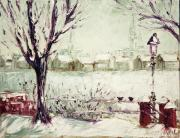
Snow in Hamburg
