= Bay City (TV series) =

Australian children's television series

Bay City is an Australian children's television series that first screened on the Seven Network in 1993. The thirteen part series follows the lives of four children in a small city on Australia's west coast.

Bay City was produced by Douglas Stanley, directed by Andrew Prowse and Howard Rubie and written by Roger Vaughan Carr, Ken Kelso, Murray Oliver and Trevor Todd.

== Cast ==
- Michael Muntz as Mike Walker
- Wendy Strehlow as Sue Walker
- Christopher Fare as Steve Walker
- Isla Fisher as Vanessa Walker
- Rachel Goodman as Joanne Zandona
- Shayne Vea as Luke Carter

== See also ==
- List of Australian television series
