= Martine Beck =

French psychotherapist (born 1947)

- Born: 1947 (age 78–79); Paris
- Education: University of Paris
- Occupations: Psychotherapist, children's author
- Writing career
- Language: French
- Genre: Picture books

Martine Beck (born 1947) is a French psychotherapist, as well as an author of picture books and other children's literature.

== Biography ==
Beck is a lifelong citizen of Paris, her city of birth. She studied child psychology and French literature at the University of Paris.

Perhaps her most commercially successful books are Le Mariage d'Ours Brun et d'Ourse Blanche (1989), Ours Brun et Ourse Blanche sous l'avalanche (1990), and Balibar et les oursonnes (1991). They tell a story of two lonely bears, Brown Bear and White Bear, who find each other, marry, and have a son: Balibar. But when they have twins, Balibar feels abandoned.

These books, illustrated by Marie H. Henry, have been translated into English as The Wedding of Brown Bear and White Bear (1990), The Rescue of Brown Bear and White Bear (1991), and Benjamin and the Bear Twins (1992), respectively. Her books have also been translated into German, Chinese, Japanese, and Greek.

FilmFair adapted the Brown Bear and White Bear stories into two animated television films (Brown Bear's Wedding and White Bear's Secret), with screenplays by Barbara Slade.

== Bibliography ==
=== Picture books ===
==== Illustrated by Joëlle Boucher ====
- Tu te souviens? (2001)
  - Oboeteiru? (Japanese: おぼえている?) (2002)
- Mélina fabrique son miel (2002)
- Priscilla tisse sa toile (2002)
- Soleillou perd sa queue (2002)
- Talpa cherche son repas (2002)
- Titine se réveille (2002)
- Tout-Roux fait ses provisions (2002)
- Zinzine fait son nid (2002)
- Sublime devient papillon (2003)

==== Illustrated by Pierre Cornuel ====
- Léopardi Galoupi (1999)

==== Illustrated by Stéphane Girel ====
- Une grande fête au jardin du Luxembourg (2000)

==== Illustrated by Agathe Hennig ====
- Pluche (2013)
- Promenons-nous dans les mois: Au fil des fêtes et des saisons (2003)
  - Greek: Περίπατος στους μήνες και στις εποχές (2012)

==== Illustrated by Marie H. Henry ====
- Le Mariage d'Ours Brun et d'Ourse Blanche (1989)
  - The Wedding of Brown Bear and White Bear (1990)
  - Brauner Bär heiratet (1990)
- Ours Brun et Ourse Blanche sous l'avalanche (1990)
  - The Rescue of Brown Bear and White Bear (1991)
  - Brauner Bär wird Vater (1991)
- Balibar et les oursonnes (1991)
  - Benjamin and the Bear Twins (1992)
  - Balibar der kleine Bär (1992)

==== Illustrated by Gilbert Houbre ====
- Le sommeil et ses secrets (1987)
  - Sleep and Dreams (1988)
  - Die Welt entdecken: Schlaf und Traum (1988)
  - Chinese: 睡覺和作夢; pinyin: Shui jiao he zuo meng (1992)

=== Other children's books ===
- Petit dictionnaire de la mythologie (1985)
