= The Red and the Blue (TV series) =

Short animated programs made in Italy

- Also known as: Red and Blue
- Genre: Stop-motion animation
- Created by: Francesco Misseri
- Written by: Francesco Misseri
- Directed by: Francesco Misseri
- Starring: Carlo Bonomi
- Theme music composer: Piero Barbetti
- Country of origin: Italy
- Original language: Onomatopoeia/gibberish (no language spoken)
- No. of episodes: 39

Production
- Running time: 4-5 minutes
- Production company: 1976 series: P.M.B.B. 2005 series: Misseri Studio

Original release
- Network: Rete 1
- Release: 1976 – 2005

The Red and the Blue (Il Rosso e il Blu) is an Italian stop-motion animated series for children. It has two clay animated characters, antagonistic shapeshifters, one colored red, the other blue.

The show sets the two characters in an undifferentiated white plane in which they interact. They are able to assume various forms at will, for example in one episode The Blue becomes a boat while The Red becomes an island, later the Blue becomes a suitcase while The Red partially converts his body into a chest-of-drawers, filling the suitcase with red 'clothes'.

Misseri's website describes the situation as:

Two blocks of clay. The Red is big and passionate; he like driving fast cars, eating... enjoying all the pleasures of life. The blue is small, smart and cunning, and he's there just to bother the red.

The characters communicate in a prelingual form that conveys emotions without using any particular language. This avoided the need for translation or subtitles. Francesco Misseri describes the language "non-verbal" and "onomatopoeic" on the website and in a comment on YouTube.

The series was written and directed by Francesco Misseri with music by Piero Barbetti. In Australia it was first broadcast on the ABC. In the United States, it first aired as part of Captain Kangaroo on CBS, and later as post-show interstitials on Nickelodeon in the mid-1980s.

During some reprints and recent YouTube releases, the title was also shortened as Red and Blue while the original name still remains intact on recent YouTube releases.

== Episodes ==
=== 1976 series ===
- The Car
- The Little Plant
- The Gun
- The Suitcase
- The Opera
- The Slot-Machine
- The Umbrella
- The Imitation
- The Lion Tamer
- The TV Set
- The Camera
- The Magician
- The Robot

=== 2005 series ===
- The Policeman
- The Tap

== TV Broadcast aired history ==
AUS

- ABC Television

USA

- CBS (Captain Kangaroo)
- Nickelodeon

GER

- Sat.1 (JuxBox)

CAN

- Canal Famille

NED

- Kindernet
