= Storybook International =

- Also known as: Stories and Fables
- Genre: Fantasy
- Based on: Storybook International by Veronica Kruger
- Written by: Barry Levinson, Virginia Boston
- Directed by: Sebastian Robinson; Peter Sasdy; Andrew Grieve
- Narrated by: Claire Nielson; Isla Blair; Virginia Boston
- Theme music composer: Larry Grossman
- Opening theme: "The Storyteller" by Larry Grossman and Barry Levinson
- Composer: Larry Grossman
- Country of origin: United Kingdom
- Original language: English
- No. of seasons: 3
- No. of episodes: 65

Production
- Producer: Barry Levinson
- Editors: Viv Grant; Dave Camps
- Running time: 26 minutes

Original release
- Network: ITV
- Release: 31 July 1981 – 24 September 1987

Storybook International (also known as Stories and Fables) is a British children's anthology television series, produced for ITV by Harlech Productions, a part of HTV and written by Barry Levinson and Virginia Boston. The weekly, half-hour show was a collection of folk tales and fairy stories from all over the world, based on an anthology of stories for children published by Gollancz in 1981, edited by Veronica Kruger.

Filmed in such locales as Russia, Ireland and Scandinavia, the series' live-action playlets were based on stories which originated in England, Czechoslovakia, France, Romania, Turkey, Wales, Israel, Norway, China, Africa, India and elsewhere. A few of the stories were campfire legends derived from the Native Americans of New England and the Maori of New Zealand.

== Broadcasting ==
First broadcast in 1981, it consisted of 65 episodes, aired as three seasons. Although its distribution was originally confined to Britain and Europe, Storybook International enjoyed extensive cable play in the US, Scandinavia and the Middle East in subsequent decades. In 1984 they released Stories and Fables under Walt Disney Home Video. Fitfully released on VHS throughout the 1980s and 1990, the full series was finally made available on DVD in 2006.

== Theme song ==
The show famously began with an animated title sequence with a troubadour singing the theme song, The Storyteller, accompanied by a friendly fox. The original version was sung in a traditional English folk style, but subsequent international versions had different versions of the song. Notably the US version replaced the line "In England, I am John" with "In America, I'm John".

== List of episodes ==
- Simpleton Peter (England)
- The Soldier Who Didn't Wash (Russia)
- Hinemoa (Maori)
- The foolish brother (Turkey)
- Cap O' Rushes (England)
- Sorrow (Hungary)
- The island of drums (Samoa)
- The priest knows all (Norway)
- The pedlar's dream (England)
- The Russian and the tartar (Russia)
- The grief of Pi Kari (Māori)
- The straw hat (Germany)
- The well at the world's end (Scotland)
- Five Loaves (Romania)
- Moses and the lime kiln (Middle East)
- The haunted pasture (England)
- The widow's lazy daughter (Ireland)
- The Twelve Months (Hungary)
- Nikorima (Māori)
- Riches or happiness (India)
- Morwen of the woodslands (Wales)
- Clever Manka (Czechoslovakia)
- The forbidden door (Arabia)
- The emperor and the abbot (Austria)
- Secret Soup (Wales)
- A hundred cattle (Africa)
- The black cape (Spain)
- The Perfect Prince (India)
- Minu (Africa)
- Basket of flowers (Scandinavia)
- The talking pony (Spain)
- The spoiled son (Romania)
- The king's secret (China)
- The miraculous doctor (Eastern Europe)
- Rich man, poor man (Africa)
- The woodcutter and the devil (France)
- The mysterious woodcutter (Japan)
- The Surprise Gift (India)
- The robber chief (Scandinavia)
- The discontented daughter (Wales)
- The three coins (Spain)
- The foolish lad (Eastern Europe)
- The blacksmith (Africa)
- The bar of gold (Eastern Europe)
- The clever thief (China)
- The squires bride (Scandinavia)
- The lost ruby (India)
- The hired help (Eastern Europe)
- The blind beauty (Philippines)
- The Enchanted King (Romania)
- The three helpers (Turkey)
- The strange guest (Canada)
- The ambitious taylor (Slovenia)
- The little beggar (Arabia)
- Myself (Canada)
- Bags of silver (Croatia)
- The stubborn princess (Eastern Europe)
- Two for one (Arabia)
- The clever trapper (Canada)
- The great slayer (Eastern Europe)
- The old kitbag (Canada)
- The wise merchant (Arabia)
- The magic stone (Serbia)
- Great Heart (North American Indian)
- The princess who never laughed (Slovenia)
