= List of South African television series =

The list of South African television series lists TV series that were created and/or shown in South Africa since 1975. It includes both South African originals and foreign imports that were dubbed into local languages.

== 0-9 ==
South African TV Series that Start with 0-9
| Title | Language | Date Released | # Seasons/Episodes | Corporation or Channel | Notes |
|---|---|---|---|---|---|
| 1945 | Afrikaans | 1983 | 1 season | SABC | A South African Broadcasting Corporation (SABC) commissioned series about a family divided between the two sides of World War II |
| 21 Jump Street | English | 1987–1991 | 5 seasons, 103 episodes | 20th Century Fox Television Patrick Hasburgh Productions Stephen J. Cannell Productions | A Canadian police procedural crime drama television series starring various teen idols including then unknown Johnny Depp as special agents. These special agents infiltrate schools and colleges to catch troubled youths and discourage kids from drinking, committing hate crimes, using drugs, spreading racism, spreading homophobia, spreading AIDS, performing domestic abuse, and being sexually promiscuous. |
| 240-Robert | English | 1979–1981 | 2 seasons, 16 episodes | Rosner Television Filmways | The series title is a reference to the call-sign designation for the LASD's search and rescue paramedic teams. Produced in the US. Stars Mark Harmon. |
| 3rd Degree | English | 2000–May 2013 | | e.tv | Local investigative journalism. Produced for e.tv, and hosted by Debora Patta. |
| 50/50 | English and Afrikaans | 1987– | | TV3, SABC1, SABC2, SABC3 | Local environmental news and documentaries. Produced for TV3, later SABC2 |
| 7de Laan | Afrikaans, with some English and Zulu | 2000–2023 | 22 seasons, over 5000 episodes as of January 2021 | SABC 2, SABC 3 YouTube | Pronounced "Sewende-laan", translates to "7th Avenue". Local soap opera centered on the lives of the people who live and work in the fictional Hillside suburb in Johannesburg. |
| 99 Caroline Street | English | 1979 | 13 episodes | SABC | A local comedy series featuring two girls who live in a flat in Hillbrow. |

== A ==
South African TV Series that Start with A
| Title | Language | Date Released | # Seasons/Episodes | Corporation or Channel | Notes |
|---|---|---|---|---|---|
| The A-Team | English | 1985–1990 | 5 seasons, 98 episodes | Universal Television Stephen J. Cannell Productions | American action-adventure television series about a fictional group of ex-Special Forces soldiers who work as mercenaries, usually pro bono publico. Hugely influential on South African schoolboys who gave spirited renditions of "Howling Mad" Murdock and B. A. Baracus on local playgrounds. |
| Adam-12 | English | 1980s | 7 seasons, 174 episodes | Mark VII Limited Universal Television | A police drama that followed the daily activities of a pair of LAPD patrol officers. The series was produced in the US from (1968–1975). Stars Martin Milner and Kent McCord. |
| Adam Strange | English, dubbed in Afrikaans | | 16 episodes | Arena Productions | From the original ITC British series Strange Report starring Anthony Quayle. |
| Against the Wind | English | 1980s | 13 episodes | Seven NetworkPegasus Productions | Australian television mini-series. It is a historical drama portraying both the British occupation of Ireland and the development of New South Wales and Australia. The series was filmed at Old Sydney Town (near Sydney), and at Warrandyte, Colac and Geelong and stars Mary Larkin and Jon English. |
| Agter Elke Man | Afrikaans | 1985–1990 | 2 seasons, 66 episodes | SABC, TV1 | Locally produced drama series starring Steve Hofmeyr. |
| Airwolf | English | 1980s | 4 seasons, 80 episodes | Belisarius Productions Universal Television Atlantis Communications MCA TV | American action-adventure television series about a high-tech military helicopter, code named Airwolf, and her crew as they undertake various missions, many involving espionage, during the Cold War. Stars Jan-Michael Vincent. |
| Aladdin: The Series | English | | 3 seasons, 86 episodes | Walt Disney Television Animation | An animated television series made by Walt Disney Television. |
| ALF | Dubbed in Afrikaans | 1980s | 4 seasons, 102 episodes | Alien Productions | An American science fiction sitcom wherein a furry alien crashes on Earth and is adopted by the Tanner family. |
| Alice's Adventures in Wonderland | English | 1980s | | | American animated series. |
| All in the Family | English | 1980s | 9 seasons, 205 episodes | Tandem Productions | American sitcom starring Carroll O'Connor as Archie Bunker. |
| Alpha 1999 | Dubbed in Afrikaans | 1980s | 2 seasons, 48 episodes | Group Three Productions (Series One) Gerry Anderson Productions (Series Two) | From the British Space: 1999 starring Martin Landau. |
| Amalia | Afrikaans | 2005–2006 | 13 episodes | Sonneblom Ateljees | TV drama series produced in South Africa, starring Marius Weyers. |
| Ambitions | | 2018–2020 | 1 season, 18 episodes | Will Packer Productions Lionsgate Television Debmar-Mercury | American drama series. |
| Anderkant die Grens | | 1989 | 6 episodes | | Translated from German series Die Wächter |
| Amen | | | 5 seasons, 110 episodes | Carson Productions Stein & Illes Productions | American television sitcom produced by Carson Productions starring Sherman Hemsley as Deacon Ernest Frye of the First Community Church of Philadelphia. |
| American Gothic | | | 1 season, 22 episodes | Renaissance Pictures Universal Worldwide Television | American horror series created by Shaun Cassidy revolving around young Caleb Temple (Lucas Black) and the town's corrupt sheriff, Lucas Buck (Gary Cole). |
| Angélique, Marquise des Anges | Dubbed in Afrikaans | 1980s | film | Compagnie Industrielle et Commerciale Cinématographique Franco London Films Gloria Film | Dubbed from a series of 5 French films starring Michèle Mercier as Angélique Sancé de Monteloup and Robert Hossein as Joffrey de Peyrac. The films were in turn based on a series of adventure novels by Anne and Serge Golon. |
| Animaniacs | English | 1990s | 5 seasons, 99 episodes | Warner Bros. Animation Amblin Entertainment | American animated series. |
| Anne of Green Gables | English | 1985 | 1 season | Anne of Green Gables Productions Sullivan Entertainment TV-60 Filmproduktion WonderWorks | Red haired Anne, an orphan, is adopted by siblings Marilla and Matthew Cuthbert. |
| Aquila | English | | 2 series, 13 episodes | | British children's television show. |
| Ark II | English | 1980s | 1 season, 15 episodes | Filmation | American live-action science fiction series aimed at children. The series was best-remembered for its titular vehicle, a futuristic six-wheeled combination RV and mobile laboratory. |
| Arende | Afrikaans | 1990s | 3 seasons, 33 episodes | SABC 1, Cape Rebel | Arende I, II and III. Historical drama about the Boer struggle during the Boer War with British imperialism, British scorched earth approach to Boer farms, and British Boer prisoner of war camps etc. Stars Ian Roberts. |
| Arendsvlei | Afrikaans | 2018– | 4 seasons | kykNET & kie | |
| Around the World with Willy Fog | English, Spanish | 1980s | 26 episodes | BRB Internacional Televisión Española | Children's cartoon created by Spanish studio BRB Internacional. Animation done by Nippon Animation. |
| Arsène Lupin | Dubbed in Afrikaans | 1980s | 2 series, 26 episodes | | Dubbed from the French TV series about a gentleman thief named Arsène Lupin. Starring Georges Descrières. |
| Ashes to Ashes | Multilingual | 2015–2016 | 2 seasons, 280 episodes | eTV | A South African telenovela about secretes, lies and sacrifices that built the Namane family, starring Nambitha Mpumlwana as Maggie Benedict. |
| Attie en Joos | Afrikaans | 1980 | | | Comedy series about the trials and tribulations of two Johannesburg hobos, starring Al Debbo and Bill Flynn. |
| Automan | Dubbed in Afrikaans | 1980s | 1 season, 13 episodes (1 unaired) | 20th Century Fox Television The Kushner-Locke Company Glen A. Larson Productions | Dubbed from the short-lived American science fiction show of the same name produced by Glen A. Larson and starring Chuck Wagner. |
| Die Avonture van Kuifie | Dubbed in Afrikaans | 1980s | 7 seasons, 102 episodes | | Dubbed from the French animated series Les Aventures de Tintin. |

== B ==
South African TV Series that Start with B
| Title | Language | Date Released | # Seasons/Episodes | Corporation or Channel | Notes |
|---|---|---|---|---|---|
| Baasspeurder Faber | Dubbed in Afrikaans | 1984–1993 | 11 seasons, 197 episodes | | Dubbed from the German Transtel police crime series Der Fahnder, starring Klaus Wennemann. |
| Backstage | English | 2000–2007 | | e.TV | Locally produced soap opera. |
| Bagpuss | English | | 1 season, 13 episodes | Smallfilms | UK children's television series, made by Peter Firmin and Oliver Postgate through their company Smallfilms. The title character is "an old, saggy cloth cat, baggy and a bit loose at the seams". |
| Bailey's Bird | English | 1979 | 1 season, 26 episodes | Fauna Productions | Australian TV series filmed in Asia featuring a father and son running a flight charter plane. |
| Balke toe | Afrikaans | 1976 | | | Boeremusiek variety show |
| Ballade vir 'n Enkeling (Ballad for an Individual) | Afrikaans | 1987 | 14 episodes | SABC1 | Drama set in 1985 featuring the sudden and mysterious disappearance of journalist Jacques Rynhard, starring Gavin van den Berg. |
| Bangalory Time | | 1976 | | SABC | SABC commissioned children's series, hosted by Janice Honeyman. |
| Banacek | English | 1970s | 2 seasons, 17 episodes | Universal Television | American detective series starring George Peppard. |
| Bananaman | English | 1980s | 3 series, 40 episodes | | Whimsical British animation. When Eric eats a banana he transforms into an adult superhero. |
| Barbapapa | English | 1970s | 2 seasons, 93 episodes | | Animated children's show originally from France. |
| Baretta | Dubbed in Afrikaans | 1980s | 4 seasons, 82 episodes | Roy Huggins-Public Arts Productions Universal Television | Dubbed from the American detective series of the same name starring Robert Blake. |
| Barney Barnato | English | 1989 | 7 episodes | SABC | Mini-series on the life of mining magnate Barney Barnato. |
| Barones Von Gees | Dubbed in Afrikaans | 1990s | 2 seasons, 21 episodes | | Dubbed from German TV series (originally titled "Der Hausgeist") starring Susanne Uhlen. |
| Battle of the Planets | Dubbed in English | 1980s | 85 episodes | Gallerie International Films, Ltd. Tatsunoko Production | American dub of the original Japanese animated show Kagaku ninja tai Gatchaman. Five young people known as G-Force, consisting of Mark, Jason, Princess, Keyop, and Tiny use their ship, the Phoenix, to battle invaders. |
| Battlestar Galactica | English | 1980s | 1 season, 24 episodes | Glen A. Larson Productions Universal Television | American science fiction series, produced in 1978 by Glen A. Larson and starring Lorne Greene, Richard Hatch and Dirk Benedict. |
| Battlestar Galactica | English | 2006–2008 | 4 seasons, 76 episodes | David Eick Productions R&D TV NBC Universal Television Studio Universal Media Studios Universal Cable Productions | A military science fiction serial drama television series. Often abbreviated as BSG or just Galactica. |
| BattleTech: The Animated Series | English | 1990s | 13 regular episodes, 1 special | Saban EntertainmentWorldwide Sports and Entertainment | An animated television series based on the BattleTech fictional universe. The series takes place in the year 3050 as the Inner Sphere, the central region of settled interstellar space, is suddenly invaded by a powerful human faction identifying itself as the Clans. |
| Batman: The Animated Series | English | 1992–1995 | 2 seasons, 85 episodes | DC Entertainment Warner Bros. Animation | Often shortened as Batman: TAS. An American, two-time Emmy Award-winning animated series adaptation of the comic book series starring the famous DC Comics superhero Batman. |
| Baywatch | English | 1989–1999 | 11 seasons, 242 episodes | | American television series about the lifeguards who patrol the crowded beaches of Los Angeles County, California. Actor of note: David Hasselhoff. |
| Beauty and the Beast | English | 1987–1989 | 3 seasons, 56 episodes | Republic Pictures | Creator Ron Koslow's updated version of the classic fairy tale, focusing on the relationship between Vincent, a noble man-beast from a utopian underground community, and Catherine, a savvy assistant District Attorney in New York, starring Ron Perlman, Linda Hamilton and Roy Dotrice. |
| Beertjie Boot | Afrikaans | | | | |
| Ben Brandt | Afrikaans | 1977 | | | South African cowboy type TV series adapted from photo comic book. Starred Vonk de Ridder as Ben Brandt & Jacques Loots. |
| Benson | | 1979–1986 | 7 seasons, 158 episodes | Witt/Thomas/Harris Productions | American television sitcom spin-off featuring the wise-cracking yet level-headed black butler from Soap, starring Robert Guillaume. |
| Die Beskermers | Dubbed in Afrikaans | 1972–1974 | 2 series, 52 episodes | Group Three Productions | Dubbed from the British ITC series The Protectors. Starring Robert Vaughn as Harry Rule and Nyree Dawn Porter as the Contessa di Contini. |
| Beste Profesor | Dubbed in Afrikaans | 1978–1979 | 4 seasons, 59 episodes | 20th Century Fox Television | Dubbed from The Paper Chase, a series set in Harvard Law School, starring John Houseman, James Stephens. |
| Beyond 2000 | | 1981–1999 | 525 episodes | | Australian science and technology television series produced by Beyond Television Productions. The show began as Towards 2000. |
| Bietjies van Voetheuwelwoud | Afrikaans | Early 90s | | | Adopted from the Littl'Bit Elves who lived in a magical foothill forest. |
| The Big Question | | | 5 parts | | British science documentary miniseries featuring notable scientists such as Stephen Hawking |
| Biltong and Potroast | | 1975 | | | Question and answer style game show between South Africans (Biltong) and UK expatriates (Potroast), hosted by longtime Springbok Radio broadcaster Clark McKay, with comedians including Con Travers (Travis, Original Biltong Team Captain), Len Davis, Cyril Green, Noel Glover, Mel Miller and Denis McLean. |
| Binnelanders | Afrikaans | 2005– | 14 seasons, over 3000 episodes as of June 2018 | Stark Films | South African hospital soap opera. |
| Big Brother South Africa | | 2000s | 5 series | MNET, DSTV | Occasional reality show, airing on MNET and all day via CCTV on DSTV. |
| Big City Heat | | | | SABC | Commissioned by the SABC. Short-lived series about the lives of two policemen. Based loosely on the long running Springbok Radio series Squad Cars. |
| The Big Valley | | 1965–1969 | 4 seasons, 112 episodes | Levy-Gardner-Laven Productions Four Star Television Margate SABC, SABC TV | American family Western series, broadcast on SABC on Friday evenings 1979 and again on SABC TV in 1986, starring Barbara Stanwyck, Lee Majors, Richard Long, Peter Breck, Linda Evans. |
| Biker Mice from Mars | | 1993–1995 | 3 seasons, 65 episodes | Brentwood Television Funnies Worldwide Sports & Entertainment, inc. Marvel Productions New World AnimationPhilippine Animation Studios | American animated science fiction series created by Rick Ungar. |
| Bionic Six | | 1987 | 2 seasons, 65 episodes | TMS Entertainment | American/Japanese animated superhero television series produced by TMS Entertainment and distributed by Studios USA and MCA Television, shown in South Africa. |
| Bitten: Sarah Graham Cooks Cape Town | English | 2013 | | Okuhle Media Sunrise Productions SABC 3 | A lifestyle, culinary series starring author and blogger, Sarah Graham. Broadcast internationally. Distributed by DCD Rights. Golden Horn Winner - 2014 SAFTAs Produced by Okuhle Media. |
| Black Beauty | English | 1980s | 2 seasons, 52 episodes | The Fremantle Corporation London Weekend Television | Produced by London Weekend Television for child audiences, starring William Lucas and Judi Bowker. |
| Blitspatrollie | Dubbed in Afrikaans | | 4 seasons, 53 episodes | Euston Films Ltd Thames Television | Dubbed from the British police drama The Sweeney. |
| Blonde Ambisie | Afrikaans | | | | (English: "Blonde Ambition") Lifestyle-show centered on the home-life of singer Patricia Lewis. Each episode features her participating in various, often random, day-to-day tasks like yoga or home renovation and home cooking. |
| Blood & Water | English | 2021–present | | Netflix | Teen crime drama that follows a girl, Puleng Khumalo (Ama Qamata), whose sister was abducted as a baby. She transfers to an elite school to find answers. |
| The Brady Bunch | English | | 5 seasons, 117 episodes | Redwood Productions Paramount Television | American sitcom |
| Brakanjan | Dubbed in Afrikaans | 1980s | 26 episodes | BRB Internacional Nippon Animation | Dubbed from the Spanish/Japanese children's cartoon D'Artacan y los tres mosqueperros/Wanwan Sanjushi |
| BraveStarr | | 1987 | 65 episodes | | American space Western animated television series. |
| The Bob Newhart Show | English | 1980s | 6 seasons, 152 episodes | MTM Enterprises | American sitcom about psychologist Dr. Robert "Bob" Hartley, starring Bob Newhart. |
| Die Boere Orkes Kompetisie | Afrikaans | 1980s | | | A music competition where bands from across the country competed against each other. The music played was a unique country style called Boeremusiek. Hosted by Dana Niehaus. Winners included the orchestras of Nico van Rensburg, Dirkie Smit and Piet van Heerden. |
| Bonanza | English | 1970s | 14 seasons, 431 episodes | NBC | American Western series starring Lorne Greene, Pernell Roberts, Dan Blocker and Michael Landon. |
| Bonkers | | 1993–1995 | 4 seasons, 61 regular episodes and 4 half-hour episodes | Walt Disney Television Animation | American animated television series from the Disney Channel. |
| Die Bosveld Hotel | Afrikaans | 1980s | mini-film | Zack du Plessis | Starring Danie Smuts, Zack du Plessis, and Christine Basson. |
| Die Brandkluis | Afrikaans | 1979 | 27 episodes | SABC, YouTube | Science fiction series commissioned by the SABC, hosted by Marinus Wijnbeek. |
| Bret Maverick | English | | 1 season, 18 episodes | | American western television series |
| Brimstone | | 1999 | 1 season, 13 episodes | Lars Thorwald Inc Warner Bros. Television | American detective TV series featuring a dead police detective, Ezekiel "Zeke" Stone (Peter Horton) whose mission (assigned by the Devil) is to return to Hell 113 spirits who have escaped to Earth. |
| Buck Rogers in die 25ste eeu | Dubbed in Afrikaans | 1980s | 2 seasons, 37 episodes | Glen A. Larson Productions Bruce Lansbury Productions John Mantley Productions Leisure Concepts Universal Television | Dubbed from the hit American science fiction series Buck Rogers in the 25th Century. Starring Gil Gerard as Capt. William 'Buck' Rogers, a US Air Force pilot who is frozen in space for five centuries due to a freak accident. Upon his revival in the 25th century he joins the Earth Defence Forces and proceeds to topple despots on sovereign planets, become romantically involved with various women and generally preserve the American way. Also starring Erin Gray as Colonel Wilma Deering. |
| Buffy the Vampire Slayer | English | 1997–2003 | 7 seasons, 144 episodes | Mutant Enemy Productions Sandollar Television Kuzui Enterprises 20th Century Fox Television | American supernatural drama television series. |
| Butler Parker | English | 1972–1973 | 2 seasons, 26 episodes | Südwestfunk | Since the novels about Butler Parker were very successful and another fictitious British pulp fiction hero (Percy Stuart) had already been adapted for the TV screen with huge success, the idea of a TV series about Butler Parker seemed like common sense. However, the show only lasted for 26 episodes. |

== C ==
South African TV Series that Start with C
| Title | Language | Date Released | # Seasons/Episodes | Corporation or Channel | Notes |
|---|---|---|---|---|---|
| Call Me Kelly | English | 1977 | 6 episodes | Heyns Films | South African show about rural life. The theme song, "Kelly's Song" by Bobby Angel and Hennie Bekker, was released as a single by Teal Records and reached #13 on Springbok's Top 20 in December 1977, spending 7 total weeks on the charts. |
| Cagney & Lacey | English | 1982–1986 | 7 seasons, 125 episodes and 4 TV movies | Mace Neufeld Productions, Filmways Television | American television series about two female police detectives, starring Tyne Daly and Sharon Gless. |
| Candid Camera | | 1970s | 38 seasons, 1000+ episodes | Allen Funt Productions | American prank comedy show |
| Cannon | English | 1971–1976 | 5 seasons, 122 episodes | QM Productions, CBS Productions | American detective series about Frank Cannon, who resigned from the LAPD and become a private detective. He charged high fees to his well-to-do clients so that he could work for poorer clients at little or no charge. Starring William Conrad. |
| The Carol Burnett Show | English | | 11 seasons, 279 episodes | Burngood, Inc. | American musical variety show featuring sketch comedy and popular guest stars. |
| Car Torque | | 2004–2007 | 6 series | SABC 3 | South African motoring show. |
| Carte Blanche | | 1988– | | M-Net | South African investigative journalism series. |
| Captains and the Kings | English | 1976 | 9 part miniseries | | American nine-part miniseries about Joseph Armagh, a poor Irish immigrant who came to the United States in the mid-19th century and proceeded, through struggle, heartache, and hard work, to become one of the richest and most powerful men in the country, starring Richard Jordan and Perry King. |
| Cash en Kie | Dubbed in Afrikaans | | 13 episodes | Seven Network | Dubbed from the original Australian series Cash and Company. |
| Catch Kandy | English | 1970s | 1 season, 13 episodes | Seven Network | Australian children's program about an orphaned brother and sister who go on the run after apparently killing their malevolent uncle. |
| Charlie Jade | English | 2004–2005 | 20 episodes | CinéGroupe | Canadian/South African science fiction television program about a detective from a parallel universe who finds himself trapped in the present day universe. The show was filmed mainly in Cape Town and stars actor Jeffrey Pierce. |
| Charlie's Angels | English | 1976–1981 | 5 seasons, 115 episodes | Spelling-Goldberg Productions, 20th Century Fox Television | American series about three women who work for a private investigation agency, one of the first shows to showcase women in roles traditionally reserved for men. The show features actresses Jaclyn Smith, Farrah Fawcett-Majors, and Kate Jackson. |
| Chip 'n Dale Rescue Rangers | | 1989–1993 | 3 seasons, 65 episodes | Walt Disney Television | American animated series produced by Walt Disney Television Animation. Created by Tad Stones and Alan Zaslove, it featured the established Disney characters Chip 'n' Dale in a new setting. |
| Casimir | Dubbed in Afrikaans | 1972–1982 | | | Dubbed from French children's TV show L'Île aux enfants Casimir |
| Chapi Chapo | | 1974 | 60 episodes | Belocapi | French short stop-motion series featuring two characters with large round hats. Created by Italo Bettiol and Stephano Lonati, with music by François de Roubaix, it premiered in 1974 on the ORTF and ran for 60 5-minute episodes. |
| Cheers | English | 1982–1993 | 11 seasons, 275 episodes, including 3 double length episodes and a triple length finale | Charles/Burrows/Charles Productions, Paramount Network Television | American situation comedy series that ran for eleven seasons, featuring actors Ted Danson, Kelsey Grammer and Woody Harrelson. |
| Cheesecake | | 1981–1982 | | SABC | SABC-commissioned children's programme. |
| CHiPs | English | 1977–1983 | 6 seasons, 139 episodes | Rosner Television, MGM Television | American television drama series following the lives of two motorcycle police officers of the California Highway Patrol. |
| Chopper One | | | 13 episodes | Spelling-Goldberg Productions | American drama series about a police helicopter team, starring Dirk Benedict. |
| Clangers | Dubbed in Afrikaans | | 5 seasons, 150 episodes | Smallfilms | Dubbed from the British stop-motion series of the same name. |
| Crime Story | English | 1986–1988 | 2 seasons, 44 episodes | Michael Mann Productions New World Television | American crime drama series. Set in the early 1960s, the series pitted two men against each other – Lt. Mike Torello (Dennis Farina) and mobster Ray Luca, (Anthony Denison) – in an obsessive drive to destroy each other. As Luca moved from street crime in Chicago, was "made" in the Chicago Outfit and was sent to Las Vegas to monitor their casinos, Torello followed Luca as part of a special Organized Crime Strike Force. |
| The Coconuts | Afrikaans and English | 2008 | | Multichoice Studios | A local sitcom featuring a white family that wakes up to find out that they have turned black, while their black maid has turned white. |
| Collage | | 1985 | | | |
| Columbo | English | 1971–1978 | 10 seasons, 69 episodes | Universal Television | American crime drama series starring Peter Falk as Lieutenant Columbo, a homicide detective with the Los Angeles Police Department. The show popularized the inverted detective story format: almost every episode began by showing the crime and its perpetrator. |
| Captain Power and the Soldiers of the Future | | 1987–1988 | 22 episodes, 3 cartoons, and 1 TV movie | | Canadian-American science fiction/action television series that merges live action with computer animation. |
| Cybernet | | 1990s | | SABC 2, Bop TV | A weekly video gaming magazine programme. |

== D ==
South African TV Series that Start with D
| Title | Language | Date Released | # Seasons/Episodes | Corporation or Channel | Notes |
|---|---|---|---|---|---|
| Dallas | | 1978–1991 | 14 seasons, 357 episodes | Lorimar Productions | American prime-time television soap opera revolving around the story of the Ewings, a wealthy Texan family well-established in the oil and cattle-ranching industries. Dallas was one of the most successful and longest-running shows in American prime-time television history, and was also hugely successful across the world. The show starred actor Larry Hagman. |
| Dark Angel | | 2000–2002 | 2 seasons, 43 episodes | Cameron/Eglee Productions 20th Century Fox Television | American biopunk/cyberpunk science fiction television series set in a post-apocalyptic Seattle. Genetically enhanced super-soldier Max Guevara fights corruption and encounters others like her. Created by James Cameron and Charles H. Eglee. The show stars actors Jessica Alba and Michael Weatherly. |
| Darkwing Duck | | 1991–1995 | 3 seasons, 91 episodes | Walt Disney Television Animation | American animated television series produced by the Walt Disney Company. It featured an eponymous superhero anthropomorphic duck with the alter ego of Drake Mallard (voiced by Jim Cummings). It is the first of two spin-offs of Ducktales. |
| Dawie die kabouter | Dubbed in Afrikaans | 1987 | 26 episodes | BRB Internacional Televisión Española | Dubbed from David, el Gnomo, a Spanish animated television series based on the children's books Gnomes and The Secret Book of Gnomes by the Dutch author Wil Huygen and illustrator Rien Poortvliet. |
| Defenders of the Earth | English | 1980s | 1 season, 65 episodes | Marvel Productions King Features Entertainment | American animated series. In the year 2015, the Earth is under constant attack and a host of heroes including Flash Gordon, the Phantom, and Mandrake the Magician are tasked to protect it. |
| Denver, the Last Dinosaur | English | 1988–1990 | 2 seasons, 50 episodes | World Events Productions Calico Entertainment Groupe IDDH Centre National Cinématographie La Ville D'Angoulême | American/French cartoon for children originally released in 1988 by World Events Productions. Episodes often focused on issues of conservation, ecology, and friendship. |
| Derrick | Dubbed in Afrikaans | 1974–1998 | 25 seasons, 281 episodes | | Dubbed from the German series of the same name. Detective Chief Inspector Stephan Derrick and his loyal assistant Inspector Harry Klein solve murders in Munich. The show stars actors Horst Tappert and Fritz Wepper. |
| Devilsdorp | English, Afrikaans | 2021 | 4-part series | Showmax | True crime documentary series about the Krugersdorp murders. |
| Diamond City | Multilingual | 2018 | | SABC 1 / Netflix | Court drama |
| DiepCity | Multilingual | 2021 | | Mzansi Magic | Telenovela |
| Dikolong | | 1990s | 13 episodes | | A Sesotho drama depicting college life. |
| Dis Hoe Dit Is, ...met Steve | Afrikaans | 2001 | | Clive Morris Productions | An Afrikaans talk-show hosted by singer Steve Hofmeyr. |
| The Dingleys | English | 1976–1977 | | SABC | South Africa's first locally produced sitcom. Set in Pietermaritzburg in Natal (now KwaZulu-Natal), it centred on a fictional middle class white South African English-speaking family called the Dingleys. The theme song was composed by Duncan Faure and performed by Rabbitt. |
| Dino-Riders | English | 1988 | 1 season, 14 episodes | MNET KTV | A cartoon television series about warring humanoids sent back in time to the age of the dinosaurs. |
| Dis My Geheim | Afrikaans | 1980s | | | Locally produced quiz show, starring Cobus Robinson, Carel Trichardt, Alwyn Lee and Sybil Coetzee. The show is remembered for the disembodied and mysterious voice announcing a contestant's 'secret' profession, "Ek is 'n Stoomketelmaker". |
| Disney's Adventures of the Gummi Bears | English | 1985–1989 | 6 seasons, 65 episodes | Walt Disney Television Animation | American animated television series about the escapades of the eponymous Gummi Bears, anthropomorphic bears who are the last remnants of a once-great civilization of Gummis that fled the land centuries ago when humans, jealous of the advancements and magical skills of the Gummi Bears, forced the species into exile. Now regarded by most of humankind as fairytales, the show's main cast of Gummi Bears (six in number at the outset of the series, increased to seven during the third season) live in the vast subterranean warren of Gummi Glen in the medieval kingdom of Dunwyn. |
| Doctor Snuggles | English | 1980 | 1 season, 13 episodes | | British animated series about an optimistic inventor, Doctor Snuggles, who has unusual adventures with his friends in a psychedelic world. |
| Dokter-Dokter | Afrikaans | 1976–1977 | 30 episodes | SABC | Comedy |
| Dragon Ball Z | Dubbed in English | 1998 | 291 episodes | Toei Animation | Japanese action-based anime. Funimation's English dub was the most commonly aired version. |
| Dot en Kie | Afrikaans | 1988 | | SABC | Local comedy series |
| DuckTales | English | 1987–1990 | 4 seasons, 100 episodes, and 1 film | Walt Disney Television Animation | American animated television series produced by Walt Disney Television Animation., based on Carl Barks's Uncle Scrooge comic book series featuring the adventures of Scrooge McDuck and his nephews. |
| Dynamite Diepkloof Dudes | | 1990s | | SABC 3 | Six boys on bicycles solve crimes in Soweto. |
| Dynasty | English | 1981–1989 | 9 seasons, 220 episodes | Aaron Spelling Productions 20th Century Fox Television | American prime time television soap opera revolving around the Carringtons, a wealthy oil family living in Denver, Colorado. The show stars actors Joan Collins, John Forsythe, and Linda Evans. |

== E ==
South African TV Series that Start with E
| Title | Language | Date Released | # Seasons/Episodes | Corporation or Channel | Notes |
|---|---|---|---|---|---|
| Early Edition | English | 1999–2000 | 4 seasons, 90 episodes | Columbia TriStar Television | American television series that chronicles the life of Gary Hobson (played by Kyle Chandler) of Chicago, Illinois who mysteriously receives the Chicago Sun-Times newspaper a day in advance, effectively giving him knowledge of the future. |
| The Edison Twins | English | 1980s | 6 seasons, 78 episodes | Nelvana | Canadian sitcom focused on the adventures of the main cast as they stumble upon one problem after another, using the science wits of fraternal twins Tom and Annie Edison to solve each situation. Each episode ends with a short animated sequence illustrating a key scientific principle demonstrated in the preceding live action story. |
| Eendag was daar | Dubbed in Afrikaans | 1980s | 26 episodes | | Dubbed from the French children's animated series Il était une fois... la vie (English: Once Upon a Time... Life). |
| Egoli: Place of Gold | multilingual | | 19 seasons, 4500+ episodes | M-Net | Soap opera. |
| Eight is Enough | English | 1977–1981 | 5 seasons, 112 episodes | Lorimar Productions | American television comedy-drama series modeled after the book of the same name by syndicated newspaper columnist Thomas Braden, a real-life father with eight children. The series was one of the few hour-long television series to use a laugh track. |
| Emergency! | English | 1972–1977 | 6 seasons, 112 episodes, and 6 TV movies | Mark VII Limited Universal Television | American drama series. The crew of Los Angeles County Fire Dept. Station 51 (particularly the paramedic team) and the fictional Rampart Hospital respond to emergencies in their operating area. The show stars actor Randolph Mantooth. |
| Emile | Dubbed in Afrikaans | 1978 | | | Dubbed from the German-Swedish TV series Michel aus Lönneberga, based on the children's book series Emil i Lönneberga by Astrid Lindgren. Theme song: "Emile was 'n stoute rakker, het gewoon in Swede, net vir kwajongstreke, was hy altyd lus..." |
| Erfsondes | Afrikaans | 2006–2010 | 5 seasons | Imani Media SABC 2 | Drama series about the sins of the past and how they revisit us in the present. Created by Henriëtta Gryffenberg under the mentorship of Rosa Keet. |
| Everwood | | 2002–2006 | 4 seasons, 89 episodes | Berlanti-Liddell Productions Warner Bros. Television | American drama series about a city doctor who moves his family to the fictional small town of Everwood, Colorado, after the death of his wife. Created by Greg Berlanti. |
| Everywhere Express | | | | SABC | SABC-commissioned children's series |

== F ==
South African TV Series that Start with F
| Title | Language | Date Released | # Seasons/Episodes | Corporation or Channel | Notes |
|---|---|---|---|---|---|
| Fables of the Green Forest | | 1973 | 52 episodes | Zuiyo Eizo | 52-part anime adaptation of a series of books published in the 1910s and 1920s by Thornton W. Burgess about the adventures of forest animals. It was created by the animation studio Zuiyo Eizo (the predecessor to Nippon Animation). |
| The Facts of Life | | 1979–1988 | 9 seasons, 201 episodes | T.A.T. Communications Co. | American spin-off of the sitcom Diff'rent Strokes. The series' original premise focused on the character Edna Garrett (Charlotte Rae) as she becomes housemother (and later, dietitian) to seven girls at the fictional Eastland School, a prestigious all-girls boarding school in Peekskill, New York. |
| The Faizal Sayed Show | | | | | TV talk show hosted by Faizal Sayed. The show tells the stories of people ranging from politicians and stars to anyone who has a story that may inspire or make a positive difference. |
| Falcon Crest | English | 1981–1991 | 9 seasons, 227 episodes | Amanda & MF Productions | American prime-time television soap opera. A total of 227 episodes were produced, starring Jane Wyman and Robert Foxworth. |
| Fame | English | 1980s | 6 seasons, 136 episodes | SABC TV4 | Hugely popular American musical drama, remembered mostly for the fictional character Leroy Johnson (Gene Anthony Ray) and the title song by Irene Cara. Aired on SABC's TV4. |
| Family Feud (South Africa) | English | 2020–present | | e.tv | Hosted by Steve Harvey, which is also hosted on the American version. |
| Family Ties | English | 1982–1989 | 7 seasons, 176 episodes, and 1 film | Ubu Productions Paramount Television | American television sitcom that aired in South Africa for seven seasons. The sitcom reflected the move in the United States from the cultural liberalism of the 1960s and 1970s to the conservatism of the 1980s. This was particularly expressed through the relationship between young Republican Alex P. Keaton (Michael J. Fox) and his liberal, former hippie parents, Elyse and Steven Keaton (Meredith Baxter-Birney and Michael Gross). |
| Fear Factor (South Africa) | | | | Pulse Creative Evolution Media | |
| Flinkdink | Afrikaans | 1977 | | | An Afrikaans general knowledge quiz game produced in South Africa and hosted by Edwill van Aarde. |
| The Flipside | English | | | MNET Series | |
| Flower Stories | | 1970s | | | |
| Four Jacks and a Jill on the Move | | 1977 | | | Music show featuring South African folk rock ensemble Four Jacks and a Jill. |

== G ==
South African TV Series that Start with G
| Title | Language | Date Released | # Seasons/Episodes | Corporation or Channel | Notes |
|---|---|---|---|---|---|
| Ga Re Dumele | SeTswana | 2010–2019 | 6 seasons | SABC 2 | Sitcom |
| The Adventures of the Galaxy Rangers | English | 1986–1989 | 1 season, 65 episodes | Gaylord Entertainment Company (Production) Tokyo Movie Shinsha (Animation) | American animated space Western series, created by Robert Mandell and Gaylord Entertainment Company. The series combined sci-fi stories with a typical wild-west-"feel", elements of a space opera, and traditional fantasy elements of sword and sorcery. It was one of the first anime-style shows to be primarily created in the US, although the actual animation was done in Japan by the famed Tokyo Movie Shinsha. At the time it was aired, it was a revolutionary children's show. |
| Gargoyles | | | 3 seasons, 78 episodes | Walt Disney Television Animation | American animated series created by Greg Weisman featuring a species of nocturnal creatures known as gargoyles that turn to stone during the day, focusing on a clan led by Goliath. |
| Generations | Multilingual | 1 February 1993 – 31 October 2014 | 4 seasons, 4246 episodes | SABC 1 | South African fantasy series. |
| A Gift to Last | | | 3 seasons, 22 episodes, and a Christmas special | | A popular Canadian series starring Gordon Pinsent from CBC Television. |
| Glaskasteel | Afrikaans, English | 1993 | | Safritel, SABC 2 | |
| Glee | | | 6 seasons, 121 episodes | MNET Series | |
| Ghostbusters | | 1986–1988 | 65 episodes | Filmation | Full name Filmation's Ghostbusters; an American animated series created by Filmation and distributed by Tribune Broadcasting. |
| The Girl from St. Agnes | English | 2019– | 1 season | Showmax | Dark secrets are revealed when a tragic event at an elite boarding school sets off a search for the truth. South African drama series. |
| Giyani: Land of Blood | Tsonga | 2019 | 2 seasons, 60 episodes | SABC 2 | First Xitsonga-language drama series |
| Groenie die draak | Dubbed in Afrikaans | 1972 | 2 seasons, 53 episodes | | Dubbed from the Italian cartoon Grisù by the Pagot brothers, about a little dragon that wants to be a firefighter. "Ek wil 'n brandweerman wees! 'n Brandweerman!" |
| Going Nowhere Slowly | | 2005–2009 | 7 seasons, 136 episodes | SABC 3 | South African travel series. |
| Goeie Môre Alaska | Dubbed in Afrikaans | | 6 seasons, 110 episodes | Universal Television | Dubbed from American TV series Northern Exposure. Joel Fleischman (Rob Morrow), a physician fresh out of medical school from New York, finds himself in the fictional remote Alaskan town of Cicely under contract to pay off his student loan. |
| Good Morning South Africa | | 1985– | | TV1, SABC 3 | Morning news show. |
| Growing Pains | English | 1985–1992 | 7 seasons, 166 episodes | Warner Bros. Television | American sitcom based on the fictional Seaver family, who reside in Long Island, New York. Dr. Jason Seaver, a psychiatrist, works from home because his wife, Maggie Malone, has gone back to work as a reporter. Jason has to take care of the kids: troublemaker Mike, honors student Carol, and rambunctious Ben. The show stars Alan Thicke, Joanna Kerns and Kirk Cameron. |
| Grootbek en katvis | Dubbed in Afrikaans | 1976 | 34 episodes | | Dubbed from American animated series Misterjaw, a show about a blue-colored great white shark dressed in a purple vest with a white collar, a black bow tie, and tall black top hat who liked to leap out of the water and shout "Het jou Katvis". |
| Gunsmoke | English | | 9 series, 480 episodes | | Long-running American Western series starring James Arness as Marshall Matt Dillon. |

== H ==
South African TV Series that Start with H
| Title | Language | Date Released | # Seasons/Episodes | Corporation or Channel | Notes |
|---|---|---|---|---|---|
| Haas Das se Nuuskas | Afrikaans | 1976 | | TV1 | (English: Haas Das's news box) Haas Das refers to the main character, a stuffed rabbit with a tie as his only clothing. The show is an Afrikaans children's programme aired on TV1 and produced by Louise Smit. Haas Das is the news anchor for Diereland (a country populated with anthropomorphic animals) and features the voice of real-life news anchor Riaan Cruywagen. |
| Happy Days | | 1974–1984 | 11 seasons, 255 episodes | Miller-Milkis Productions | This American television sitcom presents an idealized vision of life in 1950s and early 1960s America. The show features actors Ron Howard and Henry Winkler. |
| Hardcastle and McCormick | | 1983–1986 | 3 seasons, 67 episodes | Stephen J. Cannell Productions | Hardcastle and McCormick was an action/drama television series featuring Judge Milton C. Hardcastle and an ex-con and race car driver Mark "Skid" McCormick. The show stars actors Brian Keith and Daniel Hugh Kelly. |
| The Hardy Boys/Nancy Drew Mysteries | | 1977–1979 | 3 seasons, 46 episodes | Glen A. Larson Productions Universal Television | The Hardy Boys/Nancy Drew Mysteries (retitled The Hardy Boys Mysteries for season three) was a television series which aired for three seasons, starring Parker Stevenson and Shaun Cassidy as amateur sleuth brothers Frank and Joe Hardy, respectively, and Pamela Sue Martin as girl detective Nancy Drew. The Hardy Boys/Nancy Drew Mysteries was unusual in that it often dealt with the characters individually, in an almost anthological style. That is, some episodes featured only the Hardy Boys and others only Nancy Drew. |
| Hart to Hart | | 1979–1984 | 5 seasons, 110 episodes | Rona II Productions Spelling-Goldberg Productions Columbia Pictures Television | Hart to Hart was an American television series starring Robert Wagner and Stefanie Powers. The series was created by writer Sidney Sheldon and produced by Aaron Spelling and Leonard Goldberg. Actors of note include Robert Wagner and Stefanie Powers. |
| He-Man | English | 1983–1985 | | | He-Man is a heroic fictional character in the Masters of the Universe franchise by toy company Mattel. |
| Head of the Class | | 1986–1991 | 5 seasons, 114 episodes | Eustis/Elias Productions Warner Bros. Television | American sitcom following a group of gifted students in the Individualized Honors Program (IHP) at the fictional Monroe High School (later Millard Fillmore High School) in Manhattan, and their history teacher Charlie Moore. The show stars actors Howard Hesseman and Billy Connolly. |
| Hectic Nine-9 | | | | Okuhle Media, SABC 2 | Daily live children's magazine programme produced by Okuhle Media |
| Heidi | Dubbed in Afrikaans | 1980s | 52 seasons | Zuiyo Eizo | Dubbed from the Japanese anime Arupusu no Shōjo Haiji, which in turn was based on the books by Swiss author Johanna Spyri. It follows the life and of a pre-teen girl who lives with her grandfather in the Alps. |
| Here We Go Again | | 1973 | 1 season, 13 episodes | Bobka Productions Metromedia Producers Corporation | American Sitcom starring Larry Hagman. |
| Here's Boomer | | | 2 seasons | A. C. Lyles Productions Daniel Wilson Productions Paramount Television | American children's series about a dog called Boomer. |
| Het van Verlangekraal | Afrikaans | 1980s | 3 episodes | Scholtz Films | Afrikaans show written by Johann Bekker, with a script by Leon van Nierop. |
| The High Chaparral | | 1967–1971 | 4 seasons, 98 episodes | Xanadu Productions in association with NBC | The High Chaparral was a Western-themed television series which aired on NBC from 1967 to 1971. The show was created by David Dortort, who had previously created the hit Bonanza for the network. The theme song was also written and conducted by Bonanza scorer David Rose. |
| The Highwayman | English | 1989 | 10 episodes | Twentieth Century Fox Television (pilot) New West Entertainment (series) | An action-adventure themed television series starring Sam J. Jones, set in "the near future". It was created by Glen A. Larson and Douglas Heyes. |
| Hill Street Blues | | 1981–1987 | 146 episodes | MTM Enterprises | Hill Street Blues was a serial police drama that ran for 146 episodes. Actors of note include Andy Romano and Daniel J. Travanti. |
| Homeland | English, Afrikaans | 1996 | | Fevertree Productions | Starring actor Paul Buckby, this show was shot and filmed in South Africa during the 1990s. |
| Holmes & Yo-Yo | | | 13 episodes | Heyday Productions Universal Television SABC | An American comedy television series that aired on SABC for 13 episodes. The series follows Detective Holmes and his new android partner Yoyo on their adventures and misadventures, as Holmes teaches Yoyo what it is like to be human while trying to keep his quirky partner's true nature a secret from criminals and fellow cops. |
| Hunter | | 1984–1991 | 7 seasons, 152 episodes | Stephen J. Cannell Productions Stu Segall Productions NBC Studios 20th Century Fox Television | Hunter was a police drama television series. The titular character, Sgt. Rick Hunter, is a wily, physically imposing, and often rule-breaking homicide detective (badge# 089 in the early seasons, badge# 378 in later seasons) with the Los Angeles Police Department. Stepfanie Kramer co-starred in the first six of the series' seven seasons as Hunter's female partner Sgt. Dee Dee McCall. Actors of note Fred Dryer and Stepfanie Kramer. |

== I ==
South African TV Series that Start with I
| Title | Language | Date Released | # Seasons/Episodes | Corporation or Channel | Notes |
|---|---|---|---|---|---|
| Imbewu: The Seed | English, Zulu | April 2019– | 3 seasons, 615 episodes | e.tv | Drama series |
| Idols | English | 2000– | 16 seasons, 300+ episodes | M-net | South African iteration of the British reality singing competition Pop Idol. |
| Interster | Afrikaans | 1983 | 2 seasons, 37 episodes | C-films SABC | A locally produced supermarionation show similar to Thunderbirds. The main plot involved an undercover planetary defence agency operating from Cape Town under the guise of being an interstellar shipping company. |
| Inspector Carr Investigates | | | | SABC | Based on the very popular Springbok Radio series written by Michael Silver, starring Michael McCabe as Chief Inspector Carr of Scotland Yard. Commissioned by the SABC. |
| Inspector Morse | | 1980s | 7 series and 5 specials, 33 episodes | SABC 3 | British detective drama with John Thaw as Chief Inspector Morse and Kevin Whately as Sergeant Lewis. |
| Die Inspekteur | Dubbed in Afrikaans | | | | Dubbed animated series about an inspector who has to solve a crime at the end of each episode by using clues to find one of three suspects guilty and announcing "Die skuldige is dus...". |
| Iron Horse | | 1966–1968 | 2 seasons, 47 episodes | Dagonet Productions Screen Gems | Shown in South Africa in 1976; the show is an American Western television series featuring Ben Calhoun and starring Dale Robertson. |
| Isidingo | English | 2000–2020 | 22 seasons, 5414 episodes as of March 2020 | Endemol Shine Africa Pomegranate Media SABC 3 | Multilingual soap opera. |
| The Secrets of Isis | | 1980s | 2 seasons, 22 episodes | Filmation | The Secrets of Isis (also called simply Isis) starred JoAnna Cameron as Andrea Thomas, a high school science teacher who found an ancient mystical amulet on an archeological dig in Egypt. |
| The Invisible Man | English | | 2 seasons, 46 episodes | SABC 3 | An American sci-fi television series revolving around Darien Fawkes (Vincent Ventresca), a thief facing life imprisonment who was recruited by a low-rent spy organization and given the power of invisibility via implantation of a special "Quicksilver gland" in his head. |
| Isibaya | | 2013–2021 | 8 seasons, 2,028 episodes | The Bomb Shelter M-Net | South African daily drama series. |
| Isono | | 2020– | | BET Africa DsTV Channel 129 | A 2020 TV series that airs on BET Africa. |
| Is'Thunzi | Zulu, English | 2016 | 1 season, 26 episodes | Mzansi Magic | Telenovela |

== J ==
South African TV Series that Start with J
| Title | Language | Date Released | # Seasons/Episodes | Corporation or Channel | Notes |
|---|---|---|---|---|---|
| Jake and the Fatman | | 1987–1992 | 5 seasons, 106 episodes | The Fred Silverman Company | Jake and the Fatman was a television crime drama starring William Conrad as prosecutor J. L. (Jason Lochinvar) "Fatman" McCabe and Joe Penny as investigator Jake Styles. The series ran on CBS for five seasons. |
| Jam Sandwich | | 1982–1983 | 2 seasons | Australian Broadcasting Commission | |
| Jantjie | | | | | |
| Jopie Adam | Dubbed in Afrikaans | 1974–1982 | film | Sunn Classic Pictures | The American television series The Life and Times of Grizzly Adams was dubbed into Afrikaans as "Jopie Adam". In the series, Grizzly Adams is a woodsman during the frontier era who flees into the mountains after he is wrongly accused of murder. While struggling to survive, Adams discovers an orphaned grizzly bear cub whom he takes in and calls Ben. The shows stars actor Dan Haggerty. |
| Jasper le Feuvre | Afrikaans | 1984 | | Constantia Films | Afrikaans drama series. |
| Judge Thenjiwe Khambule | English, Zulu | 2018–present | | DStv | Court comedy |
| Jacob's Cross | English | 2006/2007-2013 | 7 seasons, 104 episodes | M-Net, SABC, Mzansi Magic, Africa Magic | South African/Pan African Drama Series |

== K ==
South African TV Series that Start with K
| Title | Language | Date Released | # Seasons/Episodes | Corporation or Channel | Notes |
|---|---|---|---|---|---|
| Kamera 1 | Afrikaans | 1976 | | | |
| Kamera 2 | Afrikaans | 1976 | | | |
| Kammaland | Dubbed in Afrikaans | 1976? | | | Dubbed from a French show in which marionettes are used to tell children's stories about the life of a mouse named Violetta |
| Kate & Allie | English | 1980s | 6 seasons, 122 episodes | Alan Landsburg Productions | American series starring Susan Saint James as the free-spirited Kate McArdle and Jane Curtin as her more traditional childhood friend, Allie Lowell. The two decide to share a brownstone in New York City's Greenwich Village after their respective divorces, raising their families together. The show also starred Ari Meyers as Kate's daughter Emma and Frederick Koehler and Allison Smith as Allie's children Chip and Jennie. |
| Kaptein Skarlaken | Dubbed in Afrikaans | 1970s | 1 series, 32 episodes | Century 21 Television Productions | Dubbed from Captain Scarlet and the Mysterons |
| Katch It With Khanyi | | 2014– | 3 seasons, 91 episodes as of January 2021 | e.tv | Locally produced talk show hosted by Khanyi Mbau for E.tv. |
| Kelders van Geheime | English | 2000s | 1 season, 13 episodes | Frequency Films Simon West Productions The Littlefield Company | An American action, comedy-drama television series that follows a brash NYPD detective who goes to London when one of his cases goes sour and remains there to work with New Scotland Yard. Starring Mark Valley and Sienna Miller. |
| Kind van die sterre | Dubbed in Afrikaans | 1990s | | | Dubbed from Omer et le fils de l'étoile (1992–1993). |
| The Knicky Knacky Knoo Show | English | 1976 | | SABC | SABC commissioned comedy series starring Hal Orlandini and Rod Hudson. |
| Knight Rider | English | 1983–1986 | 4 seasons, 90 episodes | Glen A. Larson Productions Universal Television | An American television series starring David Hasselhoff as Michael Knight with smart car KITT (Knight Industries Two Thousand). |
| Koffiehuis | Afrikaans | 1977 | | | Locally produced contemporary journalism. |
| Kojak | English | 1970s | 5 seasons, 118 episodes | Universal Television | American detective series starring Telly Savalas as the eponymous, bald New York City Police Department Detective Lieutenant Theo Kojak with his signature red lollipop. Kojak's Greek heritage, shared by actor Savalas, was prominently featured in the series. |
| Kommissaris Lea Sommer | Dubbed in Afrikaans | 1994 | 66 episodes | | Dubbed from German police TV series (originally titled "Die Kommissarin") starring Hannelore Elsner. |
| Koöperasie stories | Afrikaans | 1982–1987 | 2 seasons | Pendulum Films | Locally produced comedy drama. Set in a small Afrikaans town, filmed on location in the mining town of Cullinan, about a very close-knit community always gossiping about each other, "Ja, so is die mensdom, Mietie!", with "Oom Genis" usually bearing the brunt of the gossip. Starring Alex Heyns as Oom Botes, Jacques Loots as Genis, Marie Pentz as Mietie and Emgee Pretoruis as Veldsman. |
| Die Kraaines | Afrikaans | 1976–1980 | | | Locally produced youth journal hosted by Carike Keuzenkamp. |
| Konings | Afrikaans, English | 1992 | 20 episodes | Leisureco | |

== L ==
South African TV Series that Start with L
| Title | Language | Date Released | # Seasons/Episodes | Corporation or Channel | Notes |
|---|---|---|---|---|---|
| L.A. Law | | 1986–1994 | 8 seasons, 172 episodes | 20th Century Fox Television | L.A. Law was an American television legal drama. The show reflected the social and cultural ideologies of the 1980s and early 1990s. Actors of note include Harry Hamlin, Corbin Bernsen and Jimmy Smits. |
| Largo Winch | English | 2000s | 39 episodes | | A television program based on the Belgian comic book series of the same name by Philippe Francq and Jean Van Hamme starring Paolo Seganti as Largo Winch. |
| Las Vegas | English | 2004–2009 | 5 seasons, 106 episodes | Gary Scott Thompson Productions | An American television series that focuses on a team of people working at the fictional Montecito Resort & Casino dealing with issues that arise within the working environment, ranging from valet parking and restaurant management to casino security. |
| Late Nite News with Loyiso Gola | | 2010– | 11 seasons | Diprente, e.tv, eNCA | A weekly local late-night satirical television series. |
| Law & Order | | 1990–2008 | 20 seasons, 456 episodes | Wolf Films Universal Television | An American police procedural and legal drama television series created by Dick Wolf. It has been broadcast on NBC since its debut on 13 September 1990. Set in New York City, the series follows the professional lives of several police officers and prosecutors who represent the public interest in the criminal justice system. Actors of note: List of Law & Order characters. |
| La Femme Nikita | | 1997–2001 | 5 seasons, 96 episodes | Baton BroadcastingLPN Productions Fireworks Entertainment Warner Bros. Domestic Television Distribution | The television series differs from the film versions in one fundamental respect; Nikita is innocent. She is not a killer, nor a drug user, just a homeless young woman in the wrong place at the wrong time. Section One, an elite, top-secret counterterrorist organization with no affiliation to any specific government falsely believes Nikita is a killer and has what it takes to become a deadly operative. Because Nikita will be killed (or "canceled") if she fails to comply, she is forced to carry out the organization's ruthless methods of fighting terrorism while attempting to keep her moral integrity and her soul intact. This personal struggle becomes the primary conflict of the series. The show stars actress Peta Wilson. |
| La dame de Monsoreau | Afrikaans | 1976 | | | French production translated into Afrikaans based on the novel La dame de Monsoreau by Alexandre Dumas. |
| La Linea | | | 3 seasons, 90 episodes | B. Del Vita (season 1) HDH Film/TV (season 2) | |
| Ladies Man | | | 2 seasons, 30 episodes | Christopher Thompson Productions | American sitcom. |
| Lesilo | | | | | (SeTswana) Horror series. |
| Liewe Heksie | Afrikaans | 1981 | 2 seasons, 52 episodes | SABC | Liewe Heksie (Liewe means "Dear" or "Sweet" and Heksie means "little witch" - pronounced "lee-vuh heck-see") is a fictional character created in 1961 by Afrikaans children's books author Verna Vels. The Liewe Heksie series consisted of a number of books. The series was dramatised on the Afrikaans Radio Service of the SABC and was made into a popular Afrikaans language television programme complete with marionettes in 1981. |
| Little House on the Prairie | | 1974–1984 | 9 seasons, 204 episodes, 4 specials | Ed Friendly Productions NBC Productions | An American one-hour dramatic television program about Charles Ingalls, a farmer who cares very much about his family. The show stars actor Michael Landon. |
| Littlest Hobo | | | 6 seasons, 174 episodes | | Canadian series about the life of a German Shepherd, starring London the dog. |
| The Lone Ranger | | | 5 seasons, 221 episodes | Apex Film Wrather Productions | Long running American Western series starring Clayton Moore as The Lone Ranger & Jay Silverheels as Tonto |
| Looney Tunes | | | | Warner Bros. Animation | American animated shorts. |
| Longstreet | English | | 1 season, 23 episodes | Edling Productions Corsican Productions Paramount Network Television | American Series about a blind detective starring James Franciscus. |
| The Lost Islands | English | 1979 | 1 season, 26 episodes | Paramount Television Network 10 | Australian adventure series. A hurricane nearly sinks the "United World", a ship holding 40 teenagers from all around the world. 35 flee the ship on time - 5 are left behind and end up on 2 islands unknown to the outside world, inhabited by people who got there under similar circumstances 200 years ago. |
| Louis Motors | English | 1979 | | | Whacky and funny situations at a garage owned by Louis and his sister Mel. More Antics added by outrageous mechanics and a petrol attendant also not forgetting the customers. |
| Ludik | English, Afrikaans | 2022 | 1 season, 6 episodes | Netflix | Netflix’s first Afrikaans title. The racy, skop-skiet-en-donder six-part series features South African-born Hollywood actor Arnold Vosloo (Silverton Siege) in the titular role. He is styling himself as a wholesome family man running a successful furniture business—but steeped in the underworld that sees him crossing paths with mobsters and murderers. |

== M ==
South African TV Series that Start with M
| Title | Language | Date Released | # Seasons/Episodes | Corporation or Channel | Notes |
|---|---|---|---|---|---|
| Madam&Eve | English | 2000 | 3 seasons | Penguin Films | Sitcom based on the South African comic strip Madam&Eve. |
| Mad About You | English | 1993– | 8 seasons, 176 episodes | In Front Productions (1992–1999) The Cloudland Company (2019) Nuance Productions Comedy Dynamics (2019) TriStar Television (1992–1999) Sony Pictures Television (2002-2006; 2019) | An American sitcom that starred Paul Reiser and Helen Hunt as a newly married couple in New York City. |
| Major Dad | English | | 4 seasons, 96 episodes | S.B.B. Productions Spanish Trail Productions Universal Television | |
| Maan Basis Alpha | Dubbed in Afrikaans | 1975–77 | 2 series, 48 episodes | | Dubbed from the original Space: 1999, a British science-fiction television by Gerry Anderson with Martin Landau as Commander John Koenig, the leader of Moonbase Alpha. |
| Magnum, P.I. | English | | 8 seasons, 162 episodes | Belisarius Productions, Inc. Glen A. Larson Productions T.W.S. Productions, Inc. Universal Television | American detective series starring Tom Selleck. |
| Manakwalanners | Afrikaans | 1993 | 2 seasons | Quantum Produksies | A radio presenter and his sound technician set out to document the people of North West South Africa (Namaqualand). |
| Man from Atlantis | | | 13 episodes, 4 TV films | Solow Production Company | American sci-fi series starring Patrick Duffy. |
| The Man from U.N.C.L.E. | English | 1978 | 4 seasons, 105 episodes | Arena Productions Metro-Goldwyn-Mayer Television | American espionage series starring Robert Vaughn and David McCallum as special agents Napoleon Solo and Illya Kuryakin. |
| Mann & Machine | Afrikaans | | 1 season, 9 episodes | Wolf Films Universal Television | Broadcast in Afrikaans as Mann en Masjien, a futuristic police drama series starring Yancy Butler. |
| Man van Intersek | Dubbed in Afrikaans | 1976 | 1 season, 11 episodes | Harve Bennett Productions Universal Television | Dubbed from the American series Gemini Man. Sam Casey gets caught on the ocean floor when the probe is blown up by a planted mine and exposed to a massive dose of radiation which would have killed him. However, this freak accident causes him to turn invisible. The show stars actor Ben Murphy. |
| Man van Staal | Dubbed in Afrikaans | | 5 seasons, 99 episodes, 6 films | | Dubbed from the original American series The Six Million Dollar Man. Steve Austin, astronaut, is nearly killed in a crash. His body is repaired with cybernetic limbs, giving him superhuman abilities. The show stars Lee Majors. |
| Manions of America | | 1981 | 6-hour miniseries | | Mini-series about Irish immigrants in the United States during the great Famine of the mid-19th century - first American role for actor Pierce Brosnan. |
| Manemarak | Afrikaans | | | | Local children's series about an alien visiting earth. |
| Die Mannheim-sage | Afrikaans, English | 1986 | 15 episodes | Talent Films | Local drama starring Hans Strydom, Sandra Prinsloo, written by Lerina Erasmus. The show is based on the original Springbok Radio afternoon Afrikaans Serial. |
| Married... with Children | English | | 11 seasons, 259 episodes | Embassy Communications(1987–1988) (seasons 1–2) ELP Communications(1988–1997) (seasons 2–11) Columbia Pictures Television(1988–1997) (seasons 2–11) | American sitcom. |
| Marsupalami | English | 1990s | | | Children's animation. |
| M*A*S*H | English | | 11 seasons, 256 episodes | 20th Century Fox Television | American sitcom. |
| Masada | English | 1981 | 4 episodes | Universal Television | Mini-series about Jewish resistance against Roman occupation. |
| Mathaka | | 1983 | | | Soap-opera / musical comedy featuring the mbaqanga team Makgona Tsohle Band. |
| Matlock | English | | 9 seasons, 193 episodes | | American detective drama. |
| Maude | English | | 6 seasons, 141 episodes | Tandem Productions | American sitcom. |
| Maya the Bee | English | | 4 seasons, 130 episodes | Studio 100 Animation | German animation. |
| MacGyver | English | | 7 seasons, 139 episodes, 2 TV films | Henry Winkler-John Rich Productions Paramount Network Television | American action series about a secret agent who uses inventive and non-violent solutions to resolve crimes and diffuse conflict, starring Richard Dean Anderson. |
| Meisie van Avignon, Die | Dubbed in Afrikaans | 1980s | 13 episodes | Koba Films | Dubbed from the very popular French series La demoiselle d'Avignon. Romantic and bittersweet. |
| Meneer Rossi | Dubbed in Afrikaans | | | | Dubbed animated series. |
| Misdaad in Miami | | | 5 seasons, 112 episodes | Michael Mann Productions Universal Television | American detective series (Miami Vice dubbed into Afrikaans). |
| Michael Strogoff | English | | | | Animated series based on the novel of the same name by Jules Verne |
| Midweek | | 1977 | | | News and events show |
| Mike Hammer | | Early 1980s | 51 episodes | Jay Bernstein Productions Columbia Pictures Television | American detective series starring Stacey Keach as detective Mike Hammer. Shown in South Africa in the early 1980s. |
| Miena Moo | Multilingual | | | | Multilingual children's programme about a cow and her friends. |
| Millennium | English | 1990s | 3 seasons, 67 episodes | Ten Thirteen Productions 20th Century Fox Television | American television series created by Chris Carter, starring Lance Henriksen as Frank Black, a freelance forensic profiler and former FBI agent with a unique ability to see the world through the eyes of serial killers and murderers. |
| Mirage | Dubbed in Afrikaans | 1976 | 3 seasons, 39 episodes | Office de Radiodiffusion Télévision Française | Story about two fighter pilots, Tanguy and Laverdure, dubbed from the 1967 French series Les Chevaliers du ciel; also dubbed into English as The Aeronauts for the UK market. |
| Misdaad | Dubbed in Afrikaans | 1970– | 50 seasons, 1150 episodes (continuing) | | Dubbed in Afrikaans from the German series Tatort |
| Molly en Wors | Afrikaans | 2009 | 26 episodes | kykNET | Afrikaans sitcom centered around the married life of Vetkoekpaleis character Worsie Visagie. |
| Moemin | Dubbed in Afrikaans | | | | Dubbed in Afrikaans from the Swiss series |
| Money or the Box Show | | | | SABC | SABC commissioned quiz programme based on the long running Springbok Radio series Pick A Box. Hosted by Bob Courtney & Peter Lotis. |
| Monkey Magic | Dubbed in Afrikaans | | 13 episodes | B-Factory | |
| Moonlighting | English | 1985 | 5 seasons, 66 episodes | Picturemaker Productions ABC Circle Films | Comedy drama about private detectives, starring Bruce Willis and Cybill Shepherd. |
| Môre is nog 'n dag | Dubbed in Afrikaans | 1990s | 4 seasons, 83 episodes | Toots Productions Warner Bros. Television | Dubbed from the American drama series Life Goes On. |
| Mork and Mindy | English | 1986 | 4 seasons, 91/95 episodes | Henderson Production Company, Inc. Miller-Milkis Productions (1978–1981) Miller-Milkis-Boyett Productions (1981–1982) Paramount Television | Sitcom starring Robin Williams as a wacky, free-spirited humanoid who visits Earth to learn about its backward ways. |
| Mr. Belvedere | English | | 6 seasons, 117 episodes | Lazy B/F.O.B. Productions 20th Century Fox Television | |
| Muis op Mars | Dubbed in Afrikaans | | | | |
| Moses, Bemiddelaar van die ou verbond | Dubbed in Afrikaans | | 6-hour mini-series | ITC/RAI | Dubbed from the series Moses The Lawgiver, starring Burt Lancaster as Moses and Anthony Quayle as Aaron. |
| MTN Gladiators | | 1999–2001 | 8 total series | MTN, SABC 3 | Local gameshow based on the Gladiators franchise. It pitted contestants against "gladiators" in various physical challenges. Sponsored by the South African telecommunications company MTN. |
| Murder, She Wrote | English | | 12 seasons, 264 episodes, 4 TV films | Universal Television Corymore Productions | |
| Murphy Brown | | | 11 seasons, 260 episodes | Shukovsky-English Productions/Entertainment Bend in the Road Productions Warner Bros. Television | |
| Musiek Roulette | Afrikaans | 2014 | | | Musiek Roulette with Nadine, produced by Johan Stemmet. |
| Muvhango | Venda | 1997– | | SABC 2 | |
| My Two Dads | | | 3 seasons, 60 episodes | Michael Jacobs Productions | |
| The Mysterious Cities of Gold | English | 1980s | 39 episodes | Studio Pierrot DIC Audiovisuel | Animated children's adventure. |

== N ==
South African TV Series that Start with N
| Title | Language | Date Released | # Seasons/Episodes | Corporation or Channel | Notes |
|---|---|---|---|---|---|
| Nasty Boys | English | 1989 | 1 season, 13 episodes | Wolf Films Universal Television | Action drama series based on the real life narcotics officers of the North Las Vegas Police Department. |
| Net 'n Bietjie Liefde | Afrikaans | 1977 | | SABC | Local sitcom starring Dana Niehaus, Esme Euvrard, Julie Strydom, Frederic Stark, and Gert Potgieter. |
| The New Avengers | English | 1979 | 2 series, 26 episodes | | British secret agent series starring Mike Gambit (Gareth Hunt), Purdey (Joanna Lumley) and John Steed (Patrick Macnee). |
| Nie vanwee die Duisternis | Afrikaans | 1980 | | Pendulum Films | Afrikaans drama series. |
| Night Court | English | | 9 seasons, 193 episodes | Starry Night Productions | American sitcom. |
| Night Hood | English | 2000s | 1 season, 26 episodes | TF1, Canal+, YTV | A cartoon series inspired by the Arsène Lupin novels. The series was originally produced by Cinar and France Animation S.A. for television audiences in both English and French-speaking nations. |
| Niklaas | Dubbed in Afrikaans | | | | Animated TV show dubbed into Afrikaans from the Japanese animated series Furandāsu no Inu. Based on the book A Dog of Flanders by English author Maria Louise Ramé. |
| Nils Holgersson | Dubbed in Afrikaans | 1980 | 52 episodes | | Animated series dubbed from the Japanese anime Nils no Fushigi na Tabi. Based on the book Nils Holgerssons underbara resa genom Sverige by Swedish author Selma Lagerlöf. |
| Nommer Asseblief | Afrikaans | 1979 | 22 episodes | | Locally produced small town comedy. The title refers to a telephone operator asking "Number Please". |
| Noddy | English | | 2 seasons, 66 episodes | BBC Worldwide Americas Catalyst Entertainment Inc. Enid Blyton Ltd. | British animated series for children. |
| Noot vir Noot | Afrikaans | 1991– | 40 seasons | Stemmburg Television, SABC 2 | English "Note for Note" (i.e. musical note for a banknote) - Locally produced musical quiz show starring Johan Stemmet. |
| Now and Again | English | 2000 | 1 season, 22 episodes | Picturemaker Productions CBS Productions Paramount Network Television | American television series that revolves around the United States government engineering the perfect human body for use in espionage, but not being able to yet perfect the brain, starring Eric Close and Dennis Haysbert. |
| Nowhere Man | English | 1995–1996 | 1 season, 25 episodes | Lawrence Hertzog Productions Touchstone Television | American television series that aired from 1995 to 1996 starring Bruce Greenwood and created by Lawrence Hertzog. Despite critical acclaim, including TV Guide's label of "The season's coolest hit," the show was cancelled after only one season. |
| Nuustak | Afrikaans | | | | Early morning puppet comedy show placed before the local news. |

== O ==
South African TV Series that Start with O
| Title | Language | Date Released | # Seasons/Episodes | Corporation or Channel | Notes |
|---|---|---|---|---|---|
| Oompie in die Ruimte | Dubbed in Afrikaans | 1980s | | | Dubbed from the French children's series Il était une fois... l'espace. This is a sequel in a series of French edutainment programs. See: Eendag was daar... |
| Opdrag | Afrikaans | 1977 | | | Local drama series about the South African Defence Force starring James White. |
| Orkney Snork Nie | Afrikaans | 1989–1992 | 52 episodes | SABC | Local sitcom (English: Orkney isn't snoring, implying that Orkney is not a boring place). |
| Ouboet en Wors | Afrikaans | 2017 | 26 episodes | Westel Produksies | Crossover spin-off of Orkney Snork Nie, Molly en Wors and Vetkoekpaleis centering around the life of mechanic Ouboet van Tonder and his hairdresser son Hendrik (Orkney Snork Nie), battery salesman and former chef Wors Visagie and beauty specialist and former waitress Boeboe Botha (Vetkoekpaleis). The four of them co-own a house that's been converted into a business property. |
| Ouma Kom Help | Afrikaans | 1976 | | | |
| Oskar in Asblikfontein | Afrikaans | 1978, 1982–1983 | | SAUK TV1, IDTV | Locally produced puppet series about the inhabitants of Asblikfontein ("Trashcanville"), where discarded objects come to life. The main characters are Oscar, a cheeky but lovable rabbit, and Knersus, a prehistoric pterodactyl with a taste for rabbit meat. Knersus lives in a cave with his three sets of spare teeth, and it's here that he makes his wicked plans to catch Oscar and to annoy the inhabitants of Asblikfontein. Oscar's friends are knight and inventor Prins Poggenpoel, who went off course during a dragon hunt and was never found; Snorkie the little dragon; and Marietjie the pretty rag doll. The second series introduced Wonderwoef, a dog with a love for dancing and many magic tricks up his magician's hat. Oscar was based on a children's book by Norman Dahl, and the TV series was a co-production between SAUK TV1 and IDTV. |
| Our Living Planet | English | | | | |
| The Outer Limits | English | 1992–1993 | 7 seasons, 152 episodes | Alliance Atlantis Communications | American sci-fi series. |
| Onder die Dekmantel | Dubbed in Afrikaans | 1984–1985 | 1 season, 22 episodes | 20th Century Fox TelevisionGlen A. Larson Productions | Dubbed from the American series Cover Up, where character Dani pretends she is still a photographer and Mac her model, while they are secretly an undercover team. the character Mac was later replaced by Jack after an onset accident. |
| Onder draai die duiwel rond | Afrikaans | 1997 | 9 episodes | Sonneblom Films | Set in Hartbeespoort, South Africa. |
| Ovide and the Gang | | 1987–1988 | 1 season, 65 episodes | CinéGroupeOdec Kid Cartoons | A 1980s animated TV show produced by the Canadian animation studio CinéGroupe |

== P ==
South African TV Series that Start with P
| Title | Language | Date Released | # Seasons/Episodes | Corporation or Channel | Notes |
|---|---|---|---|---|---|
| Pasella | Afrikaans | 1998– | | | Local magazine programme. |
| Paddington Bear | English | 1989 | 13 episodes, 1 special | Hanna-Barbera | British animated show for children. |
| Pepero | Dubbed in Afrikaans | | 26 episodes | Wako Pro | |
| People Like Us | | 1987 | | | Local comedy TV series. |
| Persuaders, The | | | 1 series, 24 episodes | Television Reporters International Tribune production | British ITV Series starring Roger Moore and Tony Curtis. |
| Petrocelli | English | | 2 seasons, 44 episodes | Miller-Milkis Productions Paramount Network Television | American legal drama. |
| Phoenix en Kie | Afrikaans | 1979 | | Sonneblom Films, SABC | Local drama series about a boxer (played by Marius Weyers). The theme song, "Kinders van die Wind", became a SA Top 20 hit when Laurika Rauch performed the song. The series starred Dana Niehaus as the boxer's trainer. |
| Pinky and The Brain | English | | 4 seasons, 66 episodes | Warner Bros. Animation Amblin Entertainment | American animated series for children. |
| Pippi Langkous | Dubbed in Afrikaans | | 13 episodes | Nord Art Sveriges Radio | Dubbed from the Swedish television series Pippi Långstrump, based on the series of children's books written by Astrid Lindgren. |
| Pinocchio | Dubbed in Afrikaans | 1979 | 52 episodes | TV Asahi | Dubbed from the Japanese television series Piccolino no Bōken or the "Adventures of Pinocchio", based on a 52 episode anime series by Nippon Animation first aired in 1976. The story is based on the novel Pinocchio by Italian author Carlo Collodi. |
| Pieriewierie park | Afrikaans | 1980s | | | Locally produced children's series. |
| Die Plesier Boot | Dubbed in Afrikaans | 1980s | 9 seasons, 250 episodes, 5 specials | Douglas S. Cramer Productions Aaron Spelling Productions | Dubbed from the American romantic comedy series The Love Boat. 'The Captain' encourages passengers to find love every week while semi-famous guest stars roam the decks. |
| Police File | English | | | | Hosted by David Hall Green, Adrian Steed and Colin Fluxman. Written by Capt Fred Peach of the South African Police. |
| Pop Shop | English | 1976 | | | Popular music and videos. The show also features music chart countdowns. |
| Postman Pat | English | 1980s | 8 seasons, 184 episodes | Woodland Animations | A British stop-motion animated children's television series about the adventures of Pat Clifton, a postman. |
| The Pretender | English | 1990s | 4 seasons, 86 episodes | Mitchell/Van Sickle Productions NBC Studios MTM Enterprises (1996–1997) 20th Century Fox Television (1997–2000) | American television series starring Michael T. Weiss as Jarod, a genius and former child prodigy with "the ability to become anyone he wants to be". Patrick Bauchau and Andrea Parker co-star as Sydney, Jarod's childhood teacher and mentor, and Miss Parker, a childhood friend and an operative for the mysterious organization (called "The Centre") that took Jarod from his parents as a child and forced him to unwittingly use his talents for their own interests. |
| Proesstraat | Afrikaans | 2010 | 3 seasons, 78 episodes | kykNet | An improvisational comedy show based on the German concept of Schillerstrasse. |
| PULSE | English | 1976 | | | Locally produced popular talk show hosted by Neil Bagg. |
| Pumpkin Patch | English | 1987 | | | Locally produced children's series. |
| Pugwall | English | 1989 | 42 episodes | | An Australian children's TV series about the dreams of a teenage boy nicknamed Pugwall who forms a band called the Orange Organics with his friends. |

== Q ==
South African TV Series that Start with Q
| Title | Language | Date Released | # Seasons/Episodes | Corporation or Channel | Notes |
|---|---|---|---|---|---|
| Quaq Quao | | 1980s | 26 episodes | L + H Studios | An Italian animated television series for children about the adventures of a duck. |
| Quantum Leap | English | 1990s | 5 seasons, 97 episodes | Belisarius Productions Universal Television | American sci-fi series created by Donald P. Bellisario and starring Scott Bakula as Dr. Sam Beckett, a scientist who becomes lost in time following a botched experiment. Co-starring Dean Stockwell as the Al. |
| Quincy, M.E. | English | 1970s | 8 seasons, 148 episodes | Glen A. Larson Productions, Universal Studios | American detective series from Universal Studios starring Jack Klugman in the title role, a Los Angeles County medical examiner. |
| The Queen | Multilingual | 2016–present | | Mzansi Magic | Telenovela |
| Queen Sono | English | 2019 | 1 season, 6 episodes | Diprente Films | South African crime drama series from Netflix. Starring Pearl Thusi in the title role, Queen Sono. |

== R ==
South African TV Series that Start with R
| Title | Language | Date Released | # Seasons/Episodes | Corporation or Channel | Notes |
|---|---|---|---|---|---|
| Recipes for Love and Murder | English | 2022 | 1 season | M-Net | Based on the novel series by Sally Andrew. |
| Redding Internasionaal | Dubbed in Afrikaans | 1965 | 2 series, 32 episodes, 2 anniversary specials | AP Films | Dubbed from Thunderbirds. |
| Remington Steele | Dubbed in Afrikaans | | 5 seasons, 94 episodes | MTM Enterprises | Dubbed from the American detective series of the same name. |
| Republiek van Zoid Afrika | Afrikaans | 2014 | 6 episodes, 78 seasons | kykNet | Afrikaans-based music-themed talk-show hosted by South African rock singer Karen Zoid. Each episode features at least one musical guest that Zoid performs a duet with at the end of the episode. |
| Rescue 911 | English | | 7 seasons, 186 episodes, 2 specials | CBS Entertainment Productions (1989–1995) CBS Productions (1995–1996) Arnold Shapiro Productions | Informational reality television series hosted by William Shatner. |
| Reyka | English | 2021 | 1 season | M-Net | |
| Rhythm City | Multilingual | 2007–16 July 2021 | 13 seasons, 3660 episodes as of 16 July 2021 | e.tv | Youth oriented soap opera produced for e.tv. |
| Rich Man, Poor Man | English | 1976 | 12 episodes | Harve Bennett Productions Universal Television | Based on the best-selling 1970 novel by Irwin Shaw, this show spans the period from 1945 through the late 1960s and follows the divergent career courses of impoverished German immigrants the Jordache brothers. |
| The Ringmaster | | 2013– | | BiteSizeTV | |
| Riptide | English | | 3 seasons, 56 episodes | Stephen J. Cannell Productions Columbia Pictures Television | American detective series starring Perry King as Cody Allen and Joe Penny as Nick Ryder, two former Army buddies who open their own detective agency. However, realizing that computers and technology play a major role in many investigations, the guys recruit the help of Murray "Boz" Bozinsky (played by Thom Bray), a brilliant but socially inept scientist. |
| The River | English Setswana, IsiZulu, IsiXhosa | 2018–present | 3 seasons, 715 episodes as of October 2020 | 1Magic | South African telenovela created by Phathu Makwarela and Gwydion Beynon. It airs on 1Magic (formally vuzuamp). |
| Robotech | English | 1980s | 1 season, 85 episodes | Harmony Gold USA Tatsunoko ProductionsUncredited:Studio Nue Artland Artmic | Animated action sci-fi series from Japan. |
| The Rolf Harris Show | English | | 7 seasons, 68 episodes | Zweites Deutsches Fernsehen, British Broadcasting Corporation, Canadian Broadcasting Corporation, London Weekend Television | Australian light entertainment in which Rolf Harris doodles on large canvases with music, magic and humour thrown into the mix. |
| Rooi en Blou | No language | | 39 episodes | L + H Films | Italian animated children's show. |
| The Ropers | English | | 2 seasons, 28 episodes | The NRW Company | American sitcom spinoff of Three's Company, based on the British sitcom George and Mildred. The series focuses on middle-aged couple Stanley and Helen Roper (played by Norman Fell and Audra Lindley) who were landlords to Jack, Janet, Chrissy, and Larry on Three's Company. |
| Rupert Bear | Dubbed in English | | 4 seasons, 156 episodes | ATV | British puppet series from ITC. Due to the Equity ban on SA Television the series was redubbed in English with Yvonne Banning doing the voice acting. |

== S ==
South African TV Series that Start with S
| Title | Language | Date Released | # Seasons/Episodes | Corporation or Channel | Notes |
|---|---|---|---|---|---|
| Saartjie | Afrikaans, English | 1989 | 12 episodes | Independent Film Centre | Comedy about Saartjie Bauman written by Bettie Naude. |
| The Saint | English | | 6 series, 118 episodes | New World (B/W) Bamore (colour) | British action series starring Roger Moore. |
| Sanford and Son | English | | 6 seasons, 136 episodes | Tandem Productions | American sitcom. |
| Santa Barbara | English | | 9 seasons, 2137 episodes | Dobson Productions New World Television | American soap opera. |
| S'gudi S'naysi | Zulu | 1986–1992 | 4 seasons | Penguin Films, TV 2 | Long-running comedy series made by Penguin Films and broadcast on SABC. it achieved the highest audience ratings ever for any SABC show. 78-hour-long episodes were broadcast; it was also shown in Zimbabwe and Swaziland. The series starred Daphne Hlomuka, Gloria Mudau, Thembi Mtshali, and Joe Mafela. |
| Scandal! | English | 2005– | 11 seasons, 287 episodes | e.tv | Local soap opera produced for e.tv. |
| Seepsteenbateljon | Afrikaans | 1978 | | | Local drama based on a one-hour Afrikaans radio drama starring Francois de Bruin. |
| Señor Onion | English | | | | Mexican onion who used to play a guitar, sing and live in constant fear of being eaten. |
| Shaka Zulu | English, Zulu | 1986 | 1 series, 10 episodes | SABC | Locally produced historical drama about the life of the legendary Zulu king Shaka. |
| Shane | English | | 1 season, 17 episodes | Titus Productions | American TV Western. |
| Sha Na Na | English | | 4 seasons | | American musical variety show. |
| Shōgun | English | 1980 | 5 episodes | Paramount Television | American mini-series. |
| Sien Jy Nou | Afrikaans | 1984 | 10 episodes | Sonneblom Films | Afrikaans youth series about a girl's life after she is blinded in an accident at a school concert. |
| Silver Spoons | English | | 5 seasons, 116 episodes | Lightkeeper Productions Embassy Television Embassy Communications | American sitcom starring Rick Schroder as Ricky Stratton. |
| Simon & Simon | English | | 8 seasons, 156 episodes | Universal Television | American detective series. |
| Simon in the Land of Chalk Drawings | English | | 2 seasons, 24 episodes | FilmFair | British children's animated television programme. |
| Sinbad die Seeman | Dubbed in Afrikaans | 1980s | 52 episodes | Nippon Animation | 1980s children's cartoon Sinbad de Zeeman (tekenfilm), dubbed from the Japanese Arabian Nights: Sinbad's Adventures (Arabian Naito: Shindobatto no Bōken) into Afrikaans |
| Sinbad Jr. and his Magic Belt | English | 1970s | 102 episodes | Hanna-Barbera, SABC | Shown on SABC as filler 5-minute cartoons, originally aired in the US between 1965 and 1966, produced by Hanna-Barbera studios for the American International Television division of American International Pictures. |
| The Simpsons | English | 1990– | 32 seasons, 695 episodes | Gracie Films 20th Television | American animated sitcom created by Matt Groening revolving around a satirical parody of a middle class American lifestyle epitomized by its family of the same name, which consists of Homer, Marge, Bart, Lisa and Maggie. |
| Skemergrond | Afrikaans | 2024– | June 2024 season 1 began to aired monday-thursday | Kyknet &kie (channel 145) | after the cancellation of Arendsvlei a new telenovela is replacing Arendsvlei with the name Skemergrond. An Afrikaans telenovela in the cape town flats. This telenovela made his debut in June 2024 on Kyknet & kie Channel 145 |
| Skooldae | Afrikaans | | | | Popular local drama about life in an Afrikaans high school starring Ben Kruger. |
| Skoppensboer | Afrikaans | 1984 | TV film | Scholtz Films | Local drama |
| Die Slampampersirkus | Afrikaans | | | | Local drama about life in a circus starring Dana Niehaus. |
| Sledge Hammer! | English | | 2 seasons, 41 episodes | Alan Spencer Productions D'Angelo Productions New World Television | American police sitcom. |
| Small Wonder | English | | 4 seasons, 96 episodes | Metromedia Producers Corporation 20th Century Fox Television | American sitcom about a small robot girl. |
| The Smurfs | English | | 9 seasons, 256 episodes | Hanna-Barbera SEPP International S.A. Lafig S.A. | Popular 1980s animated television series from Hanna-Barbera Productions |
| SNITCH | English, Afrikaans | 2004–2007 | 2 seasons, 16 episodes | Endemol South Africa | Local series created by Gray Hofmeyr, the creator of Isidingo. |
| Space Precinct | English | 1990s | 1 season, 24 episodes | Gerry Anderson Productions Grove Television Enterprises Mentorn Films SABC 1 | A show on SABC 1 in the 1990s |
| Special Assignment | English | 1998– | Weekly broadcast | SABC 3 | Investigative journalism |
| Spioen Spioen | Dubbed in Afrikaans | 1984–1989 | 4 seasons, 88 episodes | B & E Enterprises Shoot the Moon Enterprises Warner Bros. Television | English: Scarecrow and Mrs. King. Starring actors Kate Jackson & Bruce Boxleitner. |
| Sol en Gobele | Dubbed in Afrikaans | | 4 seasons, 62 episodes | | French children's television show. |
| Die Sonkring | Afrikaans | 1991 | 15 episodes | Scholtz Films | Local drama starring Anna-Mart van der Merwe and Trudie Taljaard. |
| SOS | English | 2000–2004 | 2 seasons, 18 episodes | Penguin Films | South African produced youth sitcom about the lives of 5 flatmates. |
| Space Goofs | | 1990s–2000s | 2 seasons, 104 episodes | Gaumont Multimedia | French animated series. |
| Spartakus and the Sun Beneath the Sea | Dubbed in English | 1985 | 2 seasons, 52 episodes | | Translation of the French animated series Les Mondes engloutis, a story about a fictional lost city called Arkadia. |
| Spellbinder | English | 1995 | 2 seasons, 26 episodes | Film Australia Telewizja Polska | Polish: Dwa światy (Two worlds) - sci-fi television series produced by Film Australia and Telewizja Polska. |
| Spenser: For Hire | English | 1980s | 3 seasons, 66 episodes, 4 TV films | John Wilder Productions Jadda Productions Warner Bros. Television | A mystery television series based on Robert B. Parker's Spenser novels. |
| Spies en Plessié - Met Permissie | Afrikaans | | | | Popular comedy talk show presented by PG du Plessis and Jan Spies featuring interesting characters and storytellers. |
| Sport Billy | English | 1980s | 1 season, 26 episodes | Filmation Associates SABC | SABC animated television cartoon made by Filmation Associates |
| Sportfokus | Afrikaans | 1976–1980 | | SABC | Tuesday night sport programme presented in Afrikaans and hosted by Jan Snyman. |
| Sportsview | English | 1976–1980 | | SABC | Friday night sport programme hosted by Martin Locke. |
| Sportsvision | English | | | | Wednesday night sports programme hosted by Kim Shippey. |
| Star Trek | English | Various years | Various shows | Various companies | Extremely popular American science fiction series starring William Shatner. The series follows the exploits of Captain Kirk and the crew of the starship Enterprise as they right wrongs across the galaxy. |
| Starsky & Hutch | English | | 4 seasons, 93 episodes | Spelling-Goldberg Productions Columbia Pictures Television | American detective series. |
| Stolen Lives | English | | | | Local drama series about a woman who finds out she was kidnapped as a baby and her search for her original family, starring Gina Benjamin and Brumilda van Rensburg. |
| Straatvalk | Dubbed in Afrikaans | | 13 episodes | Limekiln-Templar Productions Universal Television | Dubbed from the American series Street Hawk, about a police officer who fights crime on his all-terrain attack motorcycle |
| Die Strate van San Francisco | Dubbed in Afrikaans | | 5 seasons, 121 episodes | QM Productions Warner Bros. Television | Dubbed from the American police series The Streets of San Francisco starring Karl Malden |
| Streetwise (South Africa) | | | | | Sunday night Christian youth programme hosted by Bonny Leibov, Hans van Heerden, and Shvonne. |
| Suburban Bliss | English | 1996– | 1 season | Dapple Films Endemol Entertainment SABC | Local sitcom. |
| Supersterre | | | | | Afrikaans reality singing competition produced and co-hosted by South African singer Patricia Lewis. Unlike similar reality singing shows like American Idol and The Voice, the show ditched the viewer-based voting-lines in favour of an audience-based reaction (as the show was filmed in front of a live studio audience). |
| Survivor (South Africa) | English | 2006– | 7 seasons, 107 episodes | Strix Endemol Afrokaans Film & Television | Local adaptation of the popular reality show Survivor. |
| Die Swart Kat | Afrikaans | 1980s | 1 season, 13 episodes | Brigadiers Films | Locally produced children's crime buster series based on the popular Afrikaans novels of the same name. |
| Storybook International | | 1983–1984 | 3 series, 65 episodes | Harlech Productions | A British children's television series produced for ITV by Harlech Productions, a part of HTV. The weekly, half-hour show was a collection of folk tales and fairy stories from all over the world based on an anthology of stories for children. |
| Skattejag | | 1985 | | | Local show in which action hero Scot Scott jumps from helicopters, climbs mountains, and dives into rivers to win prizes for a clever couple back in the Skattejag studio. The contestants had to solve three cryptic clues using maps and reference books. They then radioed the information to Scott, who'd race against the clock to find the treasure. |
| Sundowner | | | | | Local magazine show. |

== T ==
South African TV Series that Start with T
| Title | Language | Date Released | # Seasons/Episodes | Corporation or Channel | Notes |
|---|---|---|---|---|---|
| Tales from the Darkside | English | 1980s | 4 seasons, 89 episodes | Laurel EntertainmentJaygee Productions Ter wille van Oorlewing Tribune Entertainment | 1980s anthology TV series similar to The Twilight Zone, produced by George A. Romero. |
| Tales of the Gold Monkey | English | | 1 season, 22 episodes | Belisarius Productions Universal Television | American television show capitalizing on the fame of the movie Raiders of the Lost Ark, starring Stephen Collins as Grumman Goose pilot Jake Cutter. |
| TaleSpin | English | | 1 season, 65 episodes | Walt Disney Television | Disney production capitalizing on the fame of the movie Raiders of the Lost Ark. Very similar to the live action series Tales of the Gold Monkey. |
| Takalani Sesame | Venda | 2000 | 1 season, 19 episodes | SABC | Multilingual children's programme based on (and produced in co-operation with) the United States series Sesame Street. |
| Take Hart | English | | 10 series | | Featuring Tony Hart and Morph. |
| Teen Titans | | 2011 | 5 seasons, 65 episodes and a TV film | DC Comics (season 5) Warner Bros. Animation | An American series produced by Glen Murakami. |
| Tekkies | Afrikaans | | | | Youth entertainment using puppets and human actors. |
| Tandarra | | 1976 | 13 episodes | | An Australian show about the story of an unlikely trio: Joe Brady, the bounty hunter and Ryler and Jessica Johnson, and their battle against the corruption and lawlessness of Australia's gold rush. With Jessica's homestead, Tandarra, as their base, this humorous adventure follows the three as they struggle and triumph over kidnappers, robbers and swindlers who roamed the land during this bygone era. Filmed on location at Emu Bottom Homestead, Sunbury, Victoria. The show stars actor Gerard Kennedy. See: Cash and Company. |
| Tarzan koning van die oerwoud | Dubbed in Afrikaans | 1976 | 36 episodes | Filmation | Dubbed from the 1970s animated series Tarzan Lord of the Jungle. |
| Taz-Mania | | 1990s | 4 seasons, 65 episodes | Warner Bros. Animation | American cartoon series. |
| Techno Challenge | English | | | Atomic Productions | Kids' science series produced by Atomic Productions. |
| Teenage Mutant Ninja Turtles | | 1989 | 10 seasons, 193 episodes | Murakami-Wolf-Swenson Shogakukan Studios | Also known as Teenage Mutant Hero Turtles, an animated television series produced by Murakami-Wolf-Swenson and Shogakukan Studios. |
| Tell Me Something | Multilingual | 2009– | | SABC 2 | Teen-oriented talk show focusing on daily issues faced by South Africa's teens. Co-produced by Okuhle Media and independent producer Tamara Gondwe. |
| Temptation (South Africa) | | | | | |
| Ter wille van Oorlewing | Dubbed in Afrikaans | | 900+ episodes | Anglia Television | Dubbed from the British series The World of Survival. |
| Thabang Thabong | | 2003 | | SABC 2 | Children's variety programme. |
| Thirtysomething | | | 4 seasons, 85 episodes | The Bedford Falls Company MGM/UA Television Productions | |
| Those Crowded Years | | | | SABC | A documentary series commissioned by the SABC about South Africa's participation in World War II. Hosted by Dewar McCormack. |
| Three's a Crowd | | | 1 season, 22 episodes | NRW Productions Bergman-Taffner Productions | |
| Three's Company | | | 8 season, 172 episodes | NRW Productions T.T.C. Productions, Inc. | |
| Throb | | 1986–1988 | 2 seasons, 48 episodes | Swany, Inc. Procter & Gamble Productions Taft Entertainment Television | Throb is an American sitcom that aired in syndication from 6 September 1986 to 21 May 1988. |
| ThunderCats | | 1985 | 4 seasons, 130 episodes | Rankin/Bass Productions | American animated television series produced by Rankin/Bass Productions |
| The Thorn Birds | English | 1985 | 4 episodes | David Wolper-Stan Margulies Productions Edward Lewis Productions | American mini-series starring Richard Chamberlain and Rachel Ward. |
| Die Tierbrigade | Dubbed in Afrikaans | 1980s | 6 seasons, 36 episodes | Bayerischer Rundfunk (BR) France 2 (FR2) (as Antenne-2) Office de Radiodiffusion Télévision Française (ORTF) TV-60 Filmproduktion Télécip | Dubbed from the popular French detective series Les Brigades du Tigre. The series is set in early 20th century Paris and follows the activities of France's first motorized police force and their slow motion car chases. The show stars Jean-Claude Bouillon as Valentin. |
| Tiny Toons | | 1990s | 3 seasons, 98 episodes | Warner Bros. Animation Amblin Entertainment | |
| TJ 7 | Afrikaans | 1978 | 10 episodes | Brigadiers Films SABC | Comedy drama series commissioned by the SABC starring Wena Naude, Marius Weyers & Tobie Cronje. |
| T. J. Hooker | English | | 5 seasons, 91 episodes | Spelling-Goldberg Productions Columbia Pictures Television | American police drama starring William Shatner and Heather Locklear. |
| Top Billing | English | 1992–2019 | | Tswelopele Productions SABC 3 | Local magazine programme. |
| Tour of Duty | English | 1987–1990 | 58 episodes | | The show follows an American infantry platoon on a tour of duty during the Vietnam War. It ran for three seasons from September 1987 to April 1990 as 58 one-hour episodes. The show was created by Steve Duncan and L. Travis Clark and produced by Zev Braun. The Rolling Stones' Paint it Black was the show's theme song. |
| Transformers | | 1984–1992 | 4 seasons, 98 episodes | Sunbow Productions Marvel Productions Toei Animation (seasons 1–3) AKOM (seasons 2–4) | Generation One. |
| Trans-karoo | Afrikaans | 1984 | 1 season, 13 episodes | Clarens Films | Local drama about the life of the crew on the Trans-Karoo train. |
| Trompie En Die Boksembende | Afrikaans | 1980 | 11 episodes | SABC | Boys' adventure series featuring Trompie and his gang written by Topsy Smith. |
| Tropika Island Of Treasure | English | 2010 | | | Reality TV Show hosted by DJ Fresh. |
| Twin Peaks | English | | 3 seasons, 48 episodes | Lynch/Frost Productions Propaganda Films Spelling Television Twin Peaks Productions Showtime (season 3 only) Rancho Rosa Partnership (season 3 only) | American television serial drama created by David Lynch and Mark Frost. The series follows the investigation, headed by FBI Special Agent Dale Cooper (Kyle MacLachlan), of the brutal murder of a popular teenager and homecoming queen, Laura Palmer (Sheryl Lee). |
| The Big Time | English | 1991–1993 | | Dapple Films | Local production about a Greek Cypriot immigrant who starts a business in South Africa and devises a lot of get-rich-quick schemes (insurance fraud, bioscope shows etc.) The show's theme song is "I'm gonna make it big time". The show stars Frank Opperman as the character Chris Karedes. |
| The Twilight Zone | English | | 3 seasons, 65 episodes | CBS ProductionsPersistence of Vision Productions London Films CBS Broadcast International Atlantis Films | American serial featuring offbeat science fiction and light horror. Revival of Rod Serling's acclaimed 1950/1960s television series of the same name. |
| The Equalizer Die Laaste Uitweg | Dubbed in Afrikaans | 1985–1989 | 4 seasons, 88 episodes | Universal Television | Dubbed from the original American series The Equalizer. The series stars British actor Edward Woodward as Robert McCall, a former secret agent of an unnamed U.S. Government intelligence organization often referred to as "The Agency" or "The Company". McCall tries to atone for past sins by offering, free of charge, his services as a troubleshooter, protector, and investigator. |
| Tropical Heat | English | 1991–1993 | 3 seasons, 66 episodes | | Also known as Sweating Bullets - Canadian TV series starring Rob Stewart and produced in cooperation with Mexico, Israel, South Africa and the Isle of Mauritius. |
| Torings | Afrikaans | 1994 | 10 episodes | Eklips Films Leisureco | Sequel to Konings. |
| Touched by an Angel | | | 9 seasons, 211 episodes | Moon Water Productions CBS Entertainment Productions CBS Productions | American drama series created by John Masius and produced by Martha Williamson. The series stars Roma Downey as an angel named Monica and Della Reese as her supervisor Tess. |
| Telly Fun Quiz | | 1989–1990 | | | Game show starring quizmasters Martin Bailie and Eddie Eckstein. |

== U ==
South African TV Series that Start with U
| Title | Language | Date Released | # Seasons/Episodes | Corporation or Channel | Notes |
|---|---|---|---|---|---|
| Uit En Tuis | Afrikaans | 1977 | | | Local magazine programme |
| Unseen | English | 2023 | 1 season, 8 episodes | | |
| Under the Mountain | English | 1982 | 2 seasons, 12 episodes | | New Zealand children's adventure series. Teenage twin siblings, Rachel and Theo are on vacation in Auckland. There they meet Mr. Jones, an alien fighter from a distant planet who wants their help in fighting a family of slug-like extraterrestrials led by Mr. Wilberforce. |
| Uzalo | IsiZulu | 2015– | 1845 episodes as of July 2022 | Stained Glass Productions SABC | Uzalo is a television show that depicts the lives of two boys who were switched at birth. The show stars Baby Cele, Masoja Msiza and Siyabonga Rhadebe. |

== V ==
South African TV Series that Start with V
| Title | Language | Date Released | # Seasons/Episodes | Corporation or Channel | Notes |
|---|---|---|---|---|---|
| V | English | 1980s | 1 season, 19 episodes | Daniel H. Blatt-Robert Singer Productions Warner Bros. Television | American series about an invading alien race known as "The Visitors" (reptilian humanoids disguised as human beings) trying to take over Earth and the human Resistance attempting to stop them. |
| Van der Valk | | 1972–1977 | 6 series, 35 episodes | Thames Television | British television series, dubbed into Afrikaans, produced by Thames Television for the ITV network. It starred Barry Foster in the title role as Dutch detective Commissaris Piet, real name Simon van der Valk. Based on the characters of the novels of Nicolas Freeling. |
| Vers en Kapitel | Afrikaans | 1980 | | SABC | Afrikaans religious quiz programme hosted by Ds Robert Schmidt broadcast on Sunday evenings. |
| Vetkoek Paleis | Afrikaans | 1996 | 6 seasons | Westel Films | English: Vetkoek Palace - Afrikaans sitcom centered around the day-to-day lives of the staff of the popular Vetkoekpaleis, a vetkoek-themed fast food restaurant. Co-written by and starring Willie Esterhuizen, Zack du Plessis, Liane Hyle, and Alwyn Bruinders. |
| Vidoq | Dubbed in Afrikaans | 1977 | | | Dubbed from the French series of the same name. Broadcast on Saturday evenings. |
| Vicky die Viking | Dubbed in Afrikaans | 1984 | 3 seasons, 78 episodes | Zuiyo EizoTaurus Film | Children's cartoon called Vicky the Viking dubbed from the German Wickie und die starken Männer into Afrikaans. |
| Villa Rosa | Afrikaans | 2004–2016 | 2262 episodes | kykNet | Drama series about a guest house in Bloemfontein. |
| The Villagers | English | 1976 | 26 episodes | SABC | Locally produced drama series starring Gordon Macholland as Hilton Macrae, Brian O'Shaugnessy as Buller Wilmot, Clive Scott as Ted Dixon, and Stuart Brown as Cheesa. |
| Viper | English | | 4 seasons, 78 episodes | Pet Fly Productions Paramount Network Television Paramount Domestic Television | American action TV series about a special team of investigators who have a high tech Dodge Viper that can transform instantaneously from a red convertible boulevard cruiser into a sleek silver crime-busting machine. |
| Die Vlakte Duskant Hebron | Afrikaans | 1982 | TV film | Philo Pieterse Produksies | Locally produced drama. |
| Violetta | Dubbed in Afrikaans | | 3 seasons, 240 episodes | Pol-ka Producciones | |
| The Visitor | English | | 1 season, 13 episodes | Centropolis Television 20th Century Fox Television | A science fiction television series starring John Corbett as Adam McArthur, a man abducted by extraterrestrials 50 years earlier and who escapes back to Earth to help improve life for humanity. |
| Vliende Pierings | Dubbed in Afrikaans | 1980s | | | TV series dubbed into Afrikaans about UFOs and aliens. Shown in the very early 1980s. |
| Vlug van die Onregverdiges | Dubbed in Afrikaans | 1980s | 4 episodes | Hungarofilm Mafilm, RAI, Radio Télévision Belge Francophone, TF1, Technisonor | Russian melodrama based on the novel Michel Strogoff by Jules Verne. Dubbed into Afrikaans from the French series Michel Strogoff (1975). Remembered for the famous title music by Vladimir Cosma and scene in which the hero's eyes are seared shut with a red hot sword. The show stars Raimund Harmstorf. |
| The Voice South Africa | | 2009– | 4 seasons | M-Net | |
| Voyagers! | English | 1982–1983 | 1 season, 20 episodes | James D. Parriott Productions Scholastic Productions Universal Television | American science fiction time travel-based television series that aired on NBC during the 1982–1983 season. The series stars Jon-Erik Hexum and Meeno Peluce. |
| Voltron | Dubbed in English | 1984–1985 | 72 episodes | World Events Productions Toei Animation | Voltron was a Japanese animated television series first titled Voltron: Defender of the Universe. A remake of the series, Voltron: The Third Dimension was made in the 1990s using CGI. The 1980s Voltron series was based on two unrelated Japanese anime series, Beast King GoLion and Kikou Kantai Dairugger XV (both originally produced by Toei Animation & Bandai). The anime was later dubbed into English and edited by the North American television production and distribution company World Events Productions. |
| Vyfster | Afrikaans | 1984–1985 | 8 episodes | Kinnerland | English: Fivestar - Afrikaans prison drama about prison life in Pretoria Central Prison starring George Ballot as Skollie, Patrick Mynhardt as Pappa, and Emgee Pretorius as Priester. The show also starred Marius Weyers, At Botha, Carel Trichardt and Bettie Kemp. |

== W ==
South African TV Series that Start with W
| Title | Language | Date Released | # Seasons/Episodes | Corporation or Channel | Notes |
|---|---|---|---|---|---|
| Die Waaghals | Dubbed in Afrikaans | 1980s | 5 seasons, 113 episodes | Glen A. Larson Productions 20th Century Fox Television | Dubbed from the original American series The Fall Guy. The show stars Lee Majors as a stuntman. |
| Walala Wasala | | | | | |
| Die Waltons | Dubbed in Afrikaans | | 9 seasons, 221 episodes | Lorimar Productions | Dubbed from the original American series The Waltons. Affectionately immortalised by the salutation: "Goeie nag John Boy... Goeie nag Mary Ellen" |
| Wattoo Wattoo Super Bird | Dubbed in Afrikaans | 1978 | 60 episodes | Platforme 2000, Star Productions | French dubbed cartoon about a black and white ovoid bird from a cube-shaped planet called Auguste. |
| The Weakest Link (South Africa) | English | 2003–2007 | | SABC 3 | South African version of the popular game show. Hosted by Fiona Coyne. |
| Webster | English | 1980s | 6 seasons, 150 episodes | Georgian Bay Ltd. Emmanuel Lewis Entertainment Enterprises Paramount Network Television Paramount Domestic Television | American comedy series in which an orphaned African-American boy is adopted by the Papadapolis family. Every week's episode featured a different moral lesson. Starring Emmanuel Lewis as Webster. |
| Westgate | English | 1981–85 | | Independent Film Centre | |
| Winnie The Pooh | | 1990s | 4 seasons, 50 episodes | Walt Disney Television Animation | |
| Which Way? | | 2006– | | SABC 3 | Children's travelogue produced by Okuhle Media. Winner of the 2009 SAFTA Golden Horn Award for Children and Youth Programming. |
| What's your Flava? | | | | SABC 3 | Children's cooking programme produced by Okuhle Media. |
| Who Wants to be a Millionaire? (South Africa) | English | 1999–2005 | | M-Net, SABC 3 | Hosted by Jeremy Maggs which currently leads the News Night broadcast on the eNews Channel (as of 1 June 2008). |
| Who's the Boss? | English | 1980s | 8 seasons, 196 episodes | Embassy Television Embassy Communications Hunter-Cohan Productions ELP Communications Columbia Pictures Television | American comedy series in which main characters Angela and her housekeeper Tony struggle for almost eight years to not fall in love. |
| Wielie Walie | Afrikaans | 1976 | | SABC | Locally produced children's variety programme. |
| Willem | Afrikaans | 1976 | 10 episodes | SABC | |
| Wiseguy | | | 4 seasons, 75 episodes | Stephen J. Cannell Productions | Features Vinnie Terranova as an undercover agent for the OCB. |
| WKRP In Cincinnati | English | 1980s | 4 seasons, 90 episodes | | American sitcom. |

== X ==
South African TV Series that Start with X
| Title | Language | Date Released | # Seasons/Episodes | Corporation or Channel | Notes |
|---|---|---|---|---|---|
| The X-Files | English | 1990s | 11 seasons, 218 episodes | Ten Thirteen Productions 20th Century Fox Television | American science fiction television series created by Chris Carter. The show was a hit for the Fox network, and its characters and slogans (e.g., "The Truth Is Out There", "Trust No One", "I Want to Believe") became pop culture touchstones in the 1990s. Seen as a defining series of its era. The show stars David Duchovny and Gillian Anderson. |

== Y ==
South African TV Series that Start with Y
| Title | Language | Date Released | # Seasons/Episodes | Corporation or Channel | Notes |
|---|---|---|---|---|---|
| Yizo Yizo | | 1999–2004 | 3 seasons, 39 episodes | SABC 1 | Drama series. |
| Yizo Yizo 2 | | | | SABC 1 | Drama series. |
| Yu-Gi-Oh! | | 1998– | 1011 episodes, 7 specials as of January 2021 | Toei Animation, SABC 2 | |

== Z ==
South African TV Series that Start with Z
| Title | Language | Date Released | # Seasons/Episodes | Corporation or Channel | Notes |
|---|---|---|---|---|---|
| Zap Mag | English | 1988–1995 | | Louise Smit Productions | Locally produced entertainment program for teenagers. |
| Zet | Afrikaans, later multi-lingual | | | | Locally produced children's series featuring a strange creature of the same name. |
| Zama Zama | | | | | Game show hosted by Patricia Lewis and Menzi Ngubane. |
| ZANEWS | | | 9 seasons | Both Worlds | Satirical news series with puppets |
| Zone 14 | English | 2005–2012 | 5 seasons | | |

== See also ==
- Television in South Africa
- SABC
- Multichoice
- eTV
- List of Afrikaans-language films
