= Esterhuizen =

Esterhuizen is a surname. Notable people with the surname include:

- André Esterhuizen (born 1994), South African rugby union player
- Bernard Esterhuizen (born 1992), South African track cyclist
- Connor Esterhuizen (born 2021), South African cricketer
- Quintin Esterhuizen (born 1994), Namibian rugby union player
- Willie Esterhuizen, South African director, producer, writer and actor (born 1954)
