= Frank Opperman =

Frank Opperman may refer to:

- Frank Opperman (South African actor) (born 1960), South African actor and musician
- Frank Opperman (American actor) (1861–1922), actor in American silent films
