= Weg! =

Afrikaans language outdoor and travel magazine

- First issue: April 2004
- Company: Media24
- Country: South Africa
- Language: Afrikaans
- Website: www.weg.co.za

Weg! (literal English translation: Away!; title of English-language version: Go!) is an Afrikaans-language outdoor and travel magazine. It was first published in April 2004 and is owned by the Media24 division of Naspers. The magazine focuses on affordable destinations in South Africa and the rest of Africa.

In addition to travel articles, the magazine also contains photographic portfolios focusing on nature and recipes, as well as car, book, music, and outdoor equipment reviews.

The original name of the magazine was Wegbreek (Break Away), but it was forced to change its name after a court case with Ramsay, Son & Parker, the publishers of the rival Getaway magazine.

In February 2006, the magazine achieved a circulation of 77,174 (as audited by the Audit Bureau of Circulations of South Africa), making it the largest outdoor and travel magazine in any language in South Africa. This position was consolidated by the launch of its English-language sister magazine, Go!, in June of the same year, which resulted in a combined circulation figure of 113,248 by November 2006.

In December 2006, WegSleep (Tow Away), a former caravanning and camping supplement, was launched as an independent magazine.

The founding editor of the magazine was Bun Booyens. He was succeeded by Barnie Louw from 2010 to 2013, with Pierre Steyn taking over the reins as editor early in 2014.

In 2011, Weg! produced its first stand-alone travel map of the Baviaanskloof, created by in-house cartographer François Haasbroek. Since then, the magazine has published detailed travel maps of Namibia and the Kruger National Park.

== Awards ==
The magazine has received several awards, including:

- At the 2006 Magazine Publishers' Association of South Africa's Sappi Pica Awards:
  - The inaugural Jane Raphaely Award for Editor of the Year to Booyens.
  - The best magazine in the Travel, Wildlife and Conservation category.
  - The best supplement, for WegSleep.
- In both 2005 and 2006, travel editor and columnist Dana Snyman won the "ATKVeertjie" award from the Afrikaanse Taal en Kultuurvereniging (Afrikaans Language and Cultural Society) for magazine journalism.
- At the 2006 ADvantage awards of the South African magazine industry:
  - Best overall magazine.
  - Magazine editor of the year.
  - Best magazine in the leisure category.
