= Dana Snyman =

South African journalist, writer and playwright

Dana Snyman is a South African journalist, writer and playwright.

Snyman was born in Stellenbosch and matriculated from Nylstroom High School. He later followed a journalism course at the Tshwane University of Technology before joining the Afrikaans newspaper Beeld as a crime reporter.

Three years later he became a journalist at Huisgenoot magazine, where he worked for ten years. As of 2007, Snyman is the travel editor of Weg! magazine.

His first book, Uit die binneland (From the country) was published in 2005 and his second, Anderkant die scrap (On the other side of the scrap), in 2006. Both are collected short-short stories and sketches.

Snyman's first play, the one-man comedy Die Uwe, Pottie Potgieter (Yours Truly, Pottie Potgieter), was first performed in 2006 by Frank Opperman and was the runner-up for the AngloGold Ashanti/Aardklop-Smeltkroes Award for new texts in the same year.

== Awards ==
- 2005 Mondi Magazine Award for "Commentary and Critique".
- 2005 ATKVeertjie award from the Afrikaanse Taal en Kultuurvereniging (Afrikaans Language and Cultural Society), for magazine journalism.
- 2006 ATKVeertjie for magazine journalism.

== Publications ==
- Uit die binneland, 2005, ISBN 978-0-7981-4485-8.
- Anderkant die scrap, 2006, ISBN 978-0-7981-4714-9.
