= Car Torque =

South African television show

Car Torque is a South African television show produced by Hooper Productions, which deals with automotive journalism, including car reviews and analysis. It premiered on 11 April 2004 on SABC 3.

The program format is generally straightforward and simple, preferring to review cars in a conversational, sedate way. It is co-hosted by columnist David Bullard.

== See also ==
- List of South African television series
