= Anton Goosen =

South African musician and songwriter (born 1946)

- Born: 5 March 1946 (age 80); Middelburg, Eastern Cape
- Genre: Afrikaans Folk/Rock
- Instruments: Guitar and voice
- Website: www.antongoosen.co.za

Anton Goosen (born 5 March 1946 in Middelburg, Eastern Cape) is a South African musician and songwriter. He became a pivotal figure in Afrikaans music and is generally regarded as the father of Afrikaans Rock.

== Early years ==
As a young boy in school, Goosen was not considered 'bright'. At the age of 9, his teachers sought to place him in a class for mentally challenged children as his behaviour became disruptive. When he was 17, a guidance counsellor suggested to Goosen that he abandon his music career.

In 1963, Goosen was expelled from boarding school after being caught in a bath playing guitar and smoking. His guitar was confiscated and its case filled with bricks. Despite this, Goosen persevered and formed his high school's first rock band that same year.

Goosen attended the Teachers Training College Heidelberg, and qualified in Special Education after which he taught school for awhile, and worked as a writer and reviewer for Beeld, before becoming a full-time song writer.

== Career ==
Goosen wrote songs for other artists, most notably and prodigiously for Sonja Herholdt, but also for Carike Keuzenkamp, Laurika Rauch, Richard Clayderman, Francis Goya, and Koos Kombuis. He released his own first album, Boy Van Die Suburbs, in 1979, and it sold over 80,000 copies. He was noted for being the first to produce an album of his own works entirely in Afrikaans. He used irony and symbolism in his songs to protest against removals to Bantustans and to underline the injustices behind the Soweto riots.

Goosen is noted for two films for which he wrote music and directed: 'n Brief vir Simone (1980) and Sing vir die Harlekyn (1980). He wrote the theme music for Die Laaste Tango (2013), 'n Pawpaw vir my Darling (2016) and Siembamba (Lullaby) (2017). As early as 1980 Goosen was referred to as the father of the Afrikaans chanson.

== Personal life ==
Goosen married Estie Geldenhuys in June 2017. In June 2026, at age 80, he had a son with her.

== Discography ==
=== Singles ===
- "Trompie" (1980) Theme from the TV Series 'Trompie' made from the books written by Topsy Smith
- "Boy Van Die Suburbs" (1981)
- "'n Brief Vir Simone" (1981) Theme from the film of the same name
- "Deurdruk Dag Toe" (1981)
- "Baai Baai Bokkie" (1983)

=== Albums ===
- Boy Van Die Suburbs (1979)
- 2de Laan 58 (1980)
- Liedjieboer (1980)
- Jors Troelie (1981)
- Lappiesland (1985)
- Liedjieboer In Die Stad/City (1986)
- Winde Van Verandering (1988)
- Danzer (1992)
- Riviersonderend - 21 Greatest Hits (1994)
- Bushrock (Of A White Kaffir In Africa) (1996)
- Putonnerwater (1999)
- 'n Vis Innie Bos (2001)
- Anton en Vrinne Live in die Staatsteater (2003)
- Die Groen Blomme-projek (2005)
- 33 A-sides (Grootste treffers) (2008)
- 33 B-sides (getye van verandering) (2008)
- 33 Sea-sides (om te rock 'n roll) (2008)
- Volledig Vol 1 (2014)
- Volledig Vol 2 (2015)
- Volledig Vol 3 (2016)
- Love Songs (2016)
- Padkos (2017)
- 40 Jaar liedjieboer innie langpad (2019)
- Sirkels (2024)

=== Appears On ===
- Muses Op Besoek
- Alternatief Op Sy Beste
- Glenys Lynn Treffers
- Jy Is My Liefling
- Houtstok Rockfees
- Die Beste Afrikaanse Album
- Om Te Breyten
- Geraas Musiek Toekennings
- Vloek Van Die Kitaar

== Awards ==
Year	Award	Category
1979	Sarie Award	Best composition for Kruidjie-Roer-My-Nie
1979	Sarie Award	Best Singer of the Year
1999	ATKV	Contribution to Afrikaans music DECLINED
2001	Geraas	Lifelong contribution to Afrikaans music, Producer award "om te breyten"
2001	SAMA	Album of the year for Om te Breyten
2003	SAMA	Best Afrikaans album of the year for Vis innie bos
2005	Vonk	Oskar for Groen Blomme
2006	Volksblad	Artist of the year
2009	Academy of Arts and Science	Centenary Medal
2009	SAMA	Lifetime achievement award
2010	ATKV East Pretoria	Songwriting award
2011	Voortrekkers	Medal of Honour
2013	Inniebos	Contribution to Afrikaans music
2016	Federasie van Afrikaanse Kultuur (F.A.K.)	Lifelong achievement
2019	Krone Award	
