= Judge Thenjiwe Khambule =

South African comedy TV series

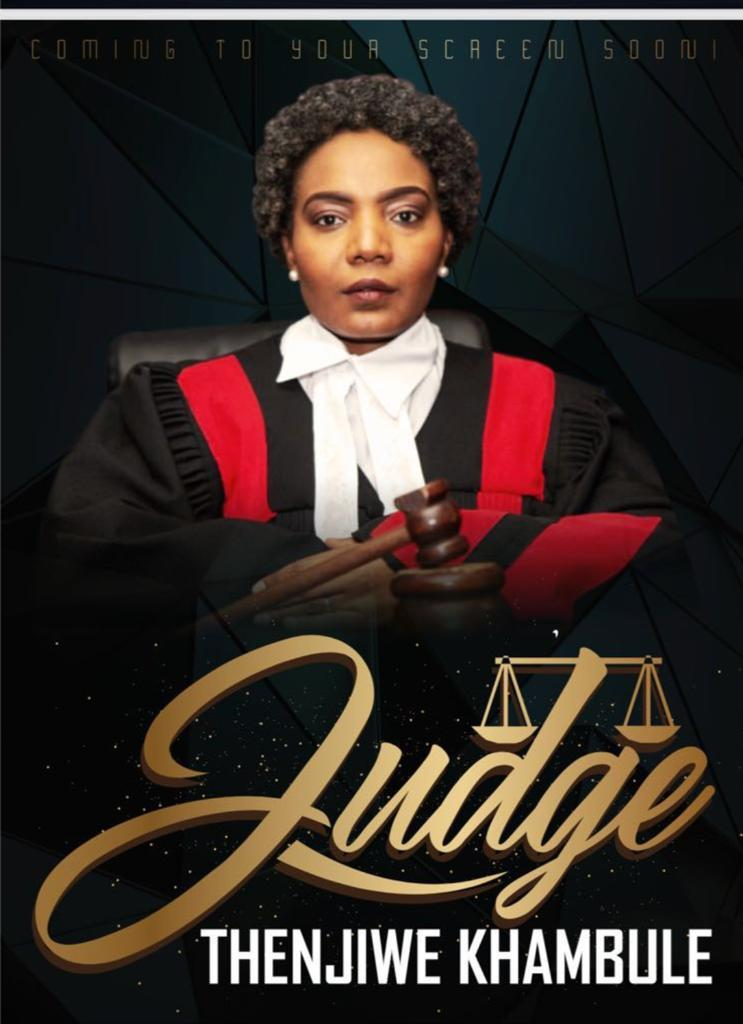
- Genre: Comedy
- Created by: Thenjiwe Moseley
- Written by: Thenjiwe Moseley
- Directed by: Zuko Nodada
- Starring: Thenjiwe Moseley; Sthembiso Khumalo; Noko Moswate; Ntombenhle Gumede; Sandile Makhanya
- Country of origin: South Africa
- Original languages: English, IsiZulu
- No. of seasons: 3
- No. of episodes: 39

Production
- Executive producer: Zamo Missie
- Production location: Pretoria
- Camera setup: Multi-camera
- Running time: 24mins
- Production company: Site Et Sons Production

Original release
- Network: DStv
- Release: February 17, 2018

Judge Thenjiwe Khambule is a South African comedy series created and written by Thenjiwe Moseley and produced by Zamo Missie,

== Plot ==
The plot consist of different court cases introduced each week, starring Thenjiwe as the judge, who presides over the cases. Much as the show has been scripted, it is based on real life court cases but given a colourful and satirical twist.

The show which initially began on YouTube was later picked up by Moja Love, is on its third season with 39 episodes to date. In season 1, the first episode premiered on 17 February 2018 and the season finale was on 12 May 2018. Season 2 premiered on 18 August 2018 with the finale on 10 November 2018 and season 3 began on 17 November, and ended on 9 February 2019.

== Cast ==
Lead Cast
Name	Role	Appearance	Notes
Thenjiwe Moseley	Judge Thenjiwe Khambule	Season 1,2&3	
Sthembiso Khumalo	Attorney	Seasons 1&2	
Noko Moswate	Court Officer	Season 1	
Ntombenhle Gumede	Clerk	Season 1	
Sandile Makhanya	Court Officer	Season 2	

Support Cast
Name	Role	Appearance
Ntosh Madlingozi		Season 1
Zimkitha Kumbaca		Season 1
Nicholas Pule Welch	Pule Welch	Season 1
Lutho John		Season 1
Siphiwe Vilakazi		Season 1
Yolo Noruwana		Season 1
Khanyisa Bunu		Season 1
Tshepi Mashego	Tshepi Masheco	Season 1
Thobani Mbhele		Season 1
Buhle Moletsane		Season 1
Mdu Ntuli		Season 1
Tlotlang Molebatsi		Season 1
Busani Mbili		Season 1
Xolile Khumalo		Season 1
Sphumuzo Sidzumo		Season 1
Nandipha Mlombi		Season 1
Reggie Ndlovu		Season 1
Thandeka Masango		Season 1
Sipho Manzini		Season 1
Gcebisa Dlamini		Season 1
Buhle Mazibuko		Season 1
Akhona Makasi		Season 1
Sifiso Nene		Season 1
Jay Boogie		Season 1
Cherise Filen	Cherise "Hlengiwe" Filen	Season 1
Sbonakaliso Mazibuko	Sbonakaliso M. Mazibuko	Season 1
Lihle Dhlomo		Season 1
Siphelele Mchunu	Siphelele "Pele-Pele" Mchunu	Season 1&2
Sthembiso Mbatha		Season 1
Aya Mpama	Ayanda Mpama	Season 1
Chumisa Cosa		Season 1
Bhekisizwe Mahlawe		Season 1
Mbalenhle Cele		Season 1
Bongani Tshabalala		Season 1
Charmaine Vukeya		Season 1
Hilda Sethosa	Hilda "Sister H" Sethosa	Season 1&2
Thapelo Mametja	Thapelo "King Flat" Mametja	Season 1
Sfundo Maphumulo		Season 1
Jabulani Mthembu		Season 1
Eugene Mathibela		Season 1
Sibongile Langa		Season 1
Denel Honeyball		Season 1
Sdu Majola		Season 1
Phumzile Mlangeni		Season 2
Mira Hewana		Season 2
Bulela Mokoena		Season 2
Welile Khanyile		Season 2
Nhlanhla Mangwaloti		Season 2
Ndumiso Ndawonde		Season 2
Xolani Ncobeni		Season 2
Phiwokuhle Twala		Season 2
Mshoza		Season 2
Olwethu Mashinga		Season 2
Busiswa Mambi		Season 2
Nqobani Mzizi		Season 2
Gift Kiva		Season 2
Clementine Zitha		Season 2
Gcina KaMajola		Season 2
Sive Matiwane		Season 2
Bongane Phethela		Season 2
Nonhlanhla Sadiki		Season 2
Sanele Zungu		Season 2
Hamashe Zungu		Season 2
Sipho Ngema		Season 2
Sthandiwe Kgoroge		Season 2
Tony Kgoroge		Season 2
Sonto Ndlozi		Season 2
Diana Maseko		Season 2
Trevor Ramothokang		Season 2
Dineo Nkosi		Season 2
Lihle Msimang		Season 2
Gabriel Mini		Season 2
Magic Hlatshwayo		Season 2
Senzo Radebe	Senzo Radebe	Season 2
Nokwazi Dlamini		Season 2
Nhlanhla Mdlalose		Season 2
