= Trudie Taljaard =

South African actress

- Born: Trudie Taljaard; 19 March 1948; Johannesburg, South Africa
- Died: 31 January 2009 (aged 60); Johannesburg, South Africa
- Education: University of Pretoria
- Occupations: Actress, Theater coach, Casting director
- Years active: 1974–2008
- Spouses: Errol Roelofsz; Nico Liebenberg
- Children: 3

Trudie Taljaard (19 March 1948 - 31 January 2009) was a South African actress, theater coach, and casting director. She is best known for the roles in the films Windprints (1989), Hitchhiker (2008) and Hearts & Minds. She founded the drama school, "Another Center for Training Actors" (ACTA). She was playfully known as the 'two-year guarantee aunt' after appearing in a well-known furniture store's commercial for a long time.

== Personal life ==
She was born on 19 March 1948 and grew up in Melville, Johannesburg, South Africa. She graduated with a bachelor's degree in drama at the University of Pretoria.

She was married to fellow actor Errol Roelofsz. After the divorce, she married the actor Nico Liebenberg. She had three daughters: Marlene, Justine and Eloise from these two marriages.

On 31 January 2009, she died at the age of 60 after being diagnosed with bone cancer in 2007.

== Career ==
Started as a theatre actress, Trudie has performed in the stage plays such as A Cedar Fall in Waterkloof, The Pencil Thief and the Angel, The Dead, Three Seasons, The Other Man, The Miracle, Raka, Dream Smuggler, and Train Stories. In 1989, she was nominated for the Artes Award. She also performed in the controversial one-man piece Kitchen Blues produced by author Jeanne Goosen. Even though it was controversial, the play received critics acclaim and she was nominated for several awards for her acting, including the Computicket Award in 1991. In 1990, she played the role of "Charlene Brits" in the TV4 comedy serial People Like Us. For that role, she was nominated for several awards and won the Star Tonight! Award for Best Actress in 1991. In the same year, she was nominated for the Dalro Theater Award for Best Actress in an Afrikaans Leading Role and the Fleur du Cap Drama Award. In 1992, she was nominated at the IGI Life for Vita Drama Award for Natal.

Then she acted in many television serials and soap operas such as; Doctor, Doctor, Sun Circle, Home Affairs, Tekwan, The Sorrow Waltz, Eagles III, Suburban Bliss, Pastorie Petals, People Like Us, Dit Wat Stom Is and Saartjie. She also starred in the films such as; Elsa's Secret (1979), Brother Matie (1984), Windprints (1990), The Long Run (2000) and Hitchhiker (2007). In 2008, she played the last television role in the Afrikaans soap opera 7de Laan by playing as matron Netta Nortjé's sister "Esther".

== Filmography ==
Year	Film	Role	Genre	Ref.
1974	Geluksdal	Set decorator	Film	
1976	Ridder van die Grootpad	Linet Hugo	Film	
1976	Liefste Madelein	Nurse	Film	
1976	Dokter, Dokter	Bekkie Hartzenberg	TV series	
1978	Drama Drama		TV series	
1979	Elsa se Geheim	Mina	Film	
1979	Grensbasis 13	Smitty's girl	Film	
1979	Phoenix & Kie	Ins	TV series	
1981	Die Avonture van Joachim Verwey	Nakkie	TV series	
1981	Beloftes van Môre	Sarie Bekker	Film	
1982	Harmonie	Anna Potgieter	TV series	
1983	Mattewis en Meraai	Suffie Barnard	TV series	
1984	Broer Matie	Lettie Summers	Film	
1984	Broer Matie	Casting director	Film	
1984	Laat Vrugte	Annie	TV movie	
1985	Two Weeks in Paradise	Charlene Britz	TV movie	
1985	Die Hartseerwals	Kotie	TV movie	
1985	Dirk Hoffman	Nellie van Rensburg	TV series	
1986	Konflikhantering		Film	
1986	Die Mannheim-Sage	Helga	TV series	
1986	Tekwan	Corrie	TV movie	
1988	Dot en Kie	Mrs. Smit	TV series	
1989	Saartjie	Mrs. Baumann	TV series	
1989	Windprints	Marie Bruck	Film	
1989	Vleuels	Corrie Ketelman	TV series	
1991	Die Sonkring	Nelmarie Vermeulen	TV series	
1993	Die Sonkring II	Nelmarie Vermeulen	TV series	
1993	Arende III: Dorsland	Katrina Stewart	TV series	
1995	Hearts & Minds	Elsa Fourie	Film	
1999	Sterk Skemer	Unemployed woman	TV movie	
2001	The Long Run	Second 1	Film	
2001	Malunde	Tannie van Rooyen	Film	
2002	Behind the Badge	Ina van Wyk	TV series	
2003	Beat the Drum	Lauren	Film	
2005	Gabriël	Tant Malie	TV series	
2008	Triomf	Dialogue coach	Film	
2008	Hitchhiker	Michelle	Film	
2008	7de Laan	Esther	TV series	
