= Thabang Thabong =

Thabang Thabong was an educational children's television programme from South Africa broadcast weekday mornings on SABC2. The programme featured a mixture of human and puppet characters plus some animation. It is no longer aired by SABC.

== Plot ==
The programme revolves around Tumi, a woman who lives in a house in Thabang Thabong with a four-year-old girl Tandi, and two meerkats Tiki and Toko. Tumi is the teacher, and also the parental figure of the program. The characters have adventures, sing songs, read books and do dances and exercises. If they have questions, they usually ask Blob, a clay animated blob, that makes shapes and objects to answer their questions because he can't speak. Once a week the flamboyant Thembi comes in with mail from fans. These letters are then read out and drawings sent in are shown.

== Characters ==
- Boitumelo Maretele as Tumi: (Human) The teacher/parent-figure of the program.
- Juanita Bermeister as Tandi: (A puppet) A little 4 year old purple girl with orange hair, that lives in Thabang Thabong.
- Neo Mothopeng as Tiki: (A puppet) A boy meerkat that lives with his sister in Thabang Thabong.
- Flakie Lakie as Toko: (A puppet) A girl meerkat that lives with her brother in Thabang Thabong.
- Thembi: (A puppet) The black-girl in Pink outfits that weekly delivers the mail to Thabang Thabong.
- Blob: (Clay animated) A clay character that makes shapes and objects to answer the others questions.
- Kevin: (Human) He only appeared in the early seasons. He only joined in the songs and exercises.
- Phuti: (Human) She originally lived in the house, but the character was then replaced by Tumi.

== Crew ==
- Producer: Alf Montso
- Executive Producer: Johann Coetzee
- Director: Marilyn Chauke
- Script Writer: Zelda Gardner
- Original Music: Fred Woods
- Puppets: Althea Oelofse
- Props: Zelda Josi Gardner
- Sets: Ben Du Plessis
- Production Runner: Lulama Hlebo
- Studio Production Assistant: Andrea Vosloo
- Production Assistant: Marilyn Chauke
