= Frank Opperman (South African actor) =

South African actor and musician (born 1960)

- Born: 8 June 1960 (age 65); Johannesburg, South Africa
- Education: University of Pretoria
- Occupation: Actor
- Spouse: Esmarie Meyer
- Children: 2

Frank Opperman (born 8 June 1960) is a South African actor and musician.

== Career ==
Born in Johannesburg, Opperman attended numerous schools across South Africa in Worcester, Benoni, Hermanus and Middelburg. He matriculated from Silverton High School in Pretoria in 1978. Opperman started studying law in 1979 at the University of Pretoria but soon lost interest and joined the South African Defence Force in 1980, where he played in an army marching band. Upon leaving the service, he dated a female drama student and became interested in acting as a career option. He subsequently obtained a three-year national diploma in acting at the Pretoria Technikon and received the Pretoria Trust Award for best student.

The following two years he worked for PACT (Performing Arts Council Transvaal) and acted in productions such as Spring awakening and Caspar in my tuin. He also acted alongside fellow South African actor Arnold Vosloo in a full-length feature film called Boetie gaan border toe, but gained popularity in an Afrikaans sitcom called Orkney Snork Nie, created by Willie Esterhuizen, playing the character named Ouboet van Tonder. In the 1990s, he starred in a South African television drama series The Big Time as Chris Karedes, a Cypriot emigrant. The series received numerous SABC Artes awards.

In 2010, he played the title role in the SABC2 sitcom Die Uwe Pottie Potgieter. In 2014 he landed a starring role in the kykNET anthology drama series Pandjieswinkelstories.

In 2018, Opperman participated in Dancing with the Stars South Africa alongside professional dancer, Jeanné Swart.

== Family ==
In 1988, he married South African actress Susan Coetzer, but in 1992 they divorced; they have one adult son, Frankie. Since 2005, he has been in a relationship with Esmarie Meyer. Their daughter was born in 2006.

== Music and more ==
In 1993 he moved to America for a few years but later returned to South Africa to become co-owner of a jazz club called Bassline in Johannesburg. He also released a rock album called Serial Boyfriend.

In the following years, he participated in various projects, amongst others Gauteng-Aleng, a sitcom where he worked once again alongside Willie Esterhuizen. He also appeared in Dryfsand, an Afrikaans television drama written by P.G. du Plessis. After twelve years, he returned to the theatre, starring in Die Uwe Pottie Potgieter, a one-man show written for him by Dana Snyman.
