= Mannemerak =

Afrikaan television show

Manemarak is an Afrikaans puppet television show about a tiny alien who regularly travels from his far-away planet to study life on earth.

== Story ==
Manemarak, following in the footsteps of his grandfather, travels to and explores the earth. His faithful companion is an artificially intelligent space-ship computer. The computer has knowledge of earth that was recorded by Manemarak's grandfather.
