= Matthys Gerhardus Smith =

South African Youth fiction Writer

Topsy Smith

Personal details
- Born: Matthys Gerhardus Smith; July 12, 1914 Parys, Free State, South Africa
- Died: March 5, 1985 (aged 70)
- Spouse: Josie Stuart-Bertram
- Children: 2
- Education: Stellenbosch University, University of Pretoria
- Occupation: Principle of Primary school in Johannesburg
- Known for: Youth fiction writer
- Nom de plume is Bettie Naude

Matthys Gerhardus Smith (1914-1985) was a South African fiction writer, mostly known for youth literature. He has written mainly under the nom de plumes “Topsy Smith” and “Bettie Naude”.

== Roots and private life ==
He was born in Parys, Free State, South Africa, on 12 July 1914. He was the son of Matthys Gerhardus Smith and Elizabeth Catharina Naude. He married Josie Stuart-Bertram. They had 2 children. He died on 5 March 1985.

== Education and work ==
Smith obtained a BA degree at University of Stellenbosch and later a Higher Diploma in Education at the University of Pretoria. He was a teacher and retired as principal of Sandringham Primary in Johannesburg.

== Writer ==
- Smith is best known for writing youth series. Trompie and Saartjie books are his bestsellers. The first series is called Trompie and the second the Saartjie. In the Trompie series (Trompie is the name of a schoolboy) 33 books were published. This was done between 1950 and 1970. A movie was made from the Trompie books.(1975) André Laubscher played the main character in the film. Anton Goosen sang the theme song. The Saartjie series (Saartjie is the name of a schoolgirl) 24 books were published. He wrote this under his mother's name Bettie Naude. This was written between 1953 and 1958. A television series was made from these books in 1989, with Annie Malan playing Saartjie.
- Apart from the above series he also wrote the following series in Afrikaans:
  - Bosapies van Bergville (translated: Apes from the bush from Bergville) – Twelve books (1958-1959)
  - Hendrik Hoffman– Six books (1959-1960)
  - Louws van Linton (translated Louws from Linton) –Eight books (1960-1964)
  - Gampietjie –Five books (1963-1964)
  - Jantjie – Six books (1963-1967)
- He also wrote in English, two series of books
  - Nicky – four books (1958)
  - Leon –four books (1963-1969)
- Adult fiction – This he wrote under the name M.G. Smith in Afrikaans
  - Juffrou Jackie se man (1970) (translated: Miss Jackkie's husband)
  - Die ontluiking van tant Matilda (1971) (translated: Aunt Matilda's change)
  - Blonde godin (1980) (translated: Blonde goddess)
- Non-fiction
  - Ons Springbok-rugbyspelers en Tokkelossie (1946) (translated: Our Springbok rugby players and the spirit of our forefathers)
  - Atlete van Springbokland (1950)(translated: Athletes from South Africa
