= The Big Question (TV series) =

British television series

The Big Question is a five-part science documentary television series broadcast in the United Kingdom on the Five channel, beginning January 2004 and continuing into 2005. In the North American market, it has been re-released on the Discovery Science network. Each half-hour episode is hosted by a renowned authority, and examines the following provocative questions:

- Part 1 – "How Did the Universe Begin?" presented by Stephen Hawking
- Part 2 – "How Did Life Begin?" presented by Harry Kroto
- Part 3 – "Why Are We Here?" presented by Richard Dawkins
- Part 4 – "Why Am I Me?" presented by Susan Greenfield
- Part 5 – "How Will It All End?" presented by Ian Stewart

The series attracted controversy and criticism from creationists, as well as praise from other reviewers.
