= Orkney Snork Nie =

- Created by: Willie Esterhuizen
- Starring: Zack du Plessis; Annette Engelbrecht; Frank Opperman; Sally Campher; Anrich Herbst; Clara Joubert
- Opening theme: by Nicky Saks
- Country of origin: South Africa
- No. of episodes: 52

Production
- Running time: 26 minutes per episode

Original release
- Network: SABC
- Release: May 1989 – 1992

Orkney Snork Nie is a Afrikaans sitcom, originally broadcast by the SABC in South Africa between 1989 and 1992. The name translates directly into Orkney Doesn't Snore, but the message being conveyed in Afrikaans is that the town isn't sleepy, there's always something happening. The series was written and directed by Willie Esterhuizen who was also involved in other popular South African series and movies. The series consists of four seasons, with two movies also produced (see below for more details). As of 2006, the series was rebroadcast on the Afrikaans DStv channel KykNet.

== Plot ==
The show was based in the mining town of Orkney, near the city of Klerksdorp (and not too far from Johannesburg), and followed the exploits of an Afrikaner family named Van Tonder, a common Afrikaans surname.

The head of the household, Hendrik (played by Zack du Plessis), worked on the mines and his wife, Maggie (Annette Engelbrecht), was a housewife. They had four children (oldest to youngest): Ouboet, Bennie, Hester and Wimpie. Ouboet (Frank Opperman) was a car mechanic. He and his wife, Yolanda (Sally Campher), had a little baby of their own, named Hendrik after his grandfather. "Ouboet" is an Afrikaans term of endearment meaning "older brother", his name really being Neels. Hester (Clara Joubert) and Wimpie (Anrich Herbst) were both at school. The character of Bennie (Charl van Heyningen) was rarely seen as he first was in the army and later left the town of Orkney. Wimpie had an on and off relationship with a girl named Sonja (Carien Wandrag), and his best friend was named Koert (Rinus van Niekerk).

From time to time other family members, such as grandfathers and grandmothers would stay over with the family and cause all sorts of mischief. Later the family also adopted two orphans, a young Afrikaner girl named Riekie (Bernice Du Plessis) and a coloured boy named Neelsie (Eugene Martin).

== History ==
Esterhuizen had played around with the idea since the early 1980s, but the SABC rejected the proposal for five years claiming it was "in bad taste". The series was finally given the go-ahead in 1987, but only after it was laboriously rewritten several times, and even then the SABC held the view that very few Afrikaners would associate with the series.

In May 1989 the first season of 13 episodes was finally broadcast. It was received extremely well, and led to three more seasons, the second being broadcast from August 1990 and the third one starting in April 1992 with season 4 starting in March 1993.

The success of the TV series, which occupied a top ten spot on ratings for most of its run and held the number one spot for weeks on end, lead to two movies also being produced. Both were extremely successful at the South African box office.

== Controversy ==
Although the series was one of South Africa's best loved and most successful series at the time of its original screening, a small but vocal minority were critical of the show. Some of those opposed to it felt that the show contained too many English words and slang, so harming the Afrikaans language.

== Season 1 (1989) ==
The first season contains a total of 13 episodes which were originally broadcast on SABC (TV1).

Snapshot	Ep #	Title	Original airdate	KykNet airdate
	1x01	"Bossie Botha se longe"	17 May 1989	7 April 2007
After Hendrik sees Bossie Botha's lungs in a jar at work, Hendrik decides to quit smoking. Ouboet has trouble putting their new all-in-one cot together. Wimpie and Koert are caught smoking in the garage by Hendrik.
	1x02	"Wingnuts"	24 May 1989	14 April 2007
Yollie is in labour but her car's wheels have not yet been replaced by Ouboet. Ouboet also makes an error when he registers his new son's name. This is baby Hendrikkie's first appearance.
	1x03	"Die Mynbestuurder se Bal"	31 May 1989	21 April 2007
Hendrik takes Maggie to a ball. Grandpa feels unwelcome. Maggie, Yolie and Rusty wear gowns made from exactly the same material to the ball. Grandpa picks a fight at the ball. The family receives a letter from Bennie.
	1x04	"Man Tot Man"	1989	2007
	1x05	"Rusty Sit en Roes"	1989	2007
	1x06	"Stink Pap en Stywe Lyne"	1989	2007
	1x07	"Kwaliteit - Tyd"	1989	2007
	1x08	"Flaminco en Koffietafel"	1989	2007
	1x09	"Ma Staak"	1989	2007
	1x10	"Bennie Kom Huistoe"	1989	2007
	1x11	"Die Kursus"	1989	2007
	1x12	"Ouboet En Yolanda Se Trek"	1989	2007
	1x13	"Wiele"	1989	2007

== Season 2 ==
Snapshot	Ep #	Title
	2x01	"Wimpie verloor sy waardigheid"
	2x02	"Sny sny, knip knip"
	2x03	"Daar's 'n bulldog in die koek"
	2x04	"Is ek vet?"
	2x05	"Ongelukkig van Orkney Skryf"
	2x06	"Konyn Koning"
	2x07	"Giepie Wie?"
	2x08	"Bella Vemaas se nood"
	2x09	"'n Ma weet alles"
	2x10	"'n Kar het ook gevoelens"
	2x11	"Kompetisie-holics"
	2x12	"Hallo Skattebol"
	2x13	"Hoes, Snork en Knor"

== Characters ==
Name	by
Hendrik van Tonder (Season 1-4)	Zack Du Plessis
Maggie van Tonder (Season 1–4)	Annette Engelbrecht
Bennie van Tonder (Season 1)	Charl van Heyningen
Wimpie van Tonder (Season 1–4)	Anrich Herbst
Hendrik "Hendrikkie" van Tonder (Season 1)	Ruan de Jager
Ouma Gouws (Season 3-4)	Dulsie van den Bergh
Koert Wessels (Season 1–4)	Rinus van Niekerk
Sonja Conradie (Season 3-4)	Carien Wandrag
Riekie van Zyl (Season 3-4)	Bernice Du Plessis
Yolanda van Tonder (Season 1-4)	Sally Campher
Neelsie van Zyl (Season 3-4)	Eugene Martin
"Ouboet" van Tonder (Season 1-4)	Frank Opperman

== Films ==
In later years two films were released based on the television sitcom. Many of the same actors were involved in the films, though Ouboet was portrayed by Marcel van Heerden in the first one since Frank Opperman was acting in the lead role of another South African series The Big Time. The films were:

- Orkney Snork Nie (Die Movie), tagline "Dis Lekker By Die See" (translation: It's Fun At The Sea), released 27 November 1992
- Orkney Snork Nie 2, tagline "Nog 'n Movie" (translation: Another Movie), released 24 December 1993
