= Zack du Plessis =

South African actor

- Born: 28 November 1950
- Died: June 2011 (aged 60–61); Pretoria, South Africa
- Occupation(s): Actor, comedian
- Spouse: Magda van Biljon
- Children: Bernice du Plessis; Wenef du Plessis

Zack du Plessis was a South African actor famous for his roles as Hendrik van Tonder in Orkney Snork Nie and as Frik Delport in Vetkoekpaleis. He died on 16 June 2011.

== Filmography ==
- Die Winter van 14 Julie 1977
- Pretoria, O Pretoria! 1979
- The Fifth Season 1979
- Blink Stefaans 1981
- Roep van die Visarend 1982
- Koöperasiestories 1983-1985
- Orkney Snork Nie 1989
- Vetkoekpaleis 1996-
- Kaalgat tussen die daisies 1997
- Mr Bones 2001
- Afspraak in die Kalahari 1975
- Liefste Veertjie 1975
- Jakkalsdraai se mense 1975
- Willlem 1976
- Funny People 1976
- Die Rebel 1976
- Springbok 1976
- Dokter, Dokter 1976
- 'n Sondag in September 1976
- Thaba 1977
- Net 'n Bietjie Liefde 1977
- TJ 7 1978
- Diamant en die Dief 1978
- Sonja 1978
- Billy Boy 1978
- Weerskant die Nag 1979
- Die Eensame Vlug 1979
- Die Siel van die Mier 1979
- Skelms 1980
- Oom Kaspaas en Nefie 1980
- Kiepie & Kandas 1981
- Gazette 1981
- Harmonie 1982
- Gideon Scheepers 1982
- Bosveld Hotel...Die Moewie 1982
- Trans-Karoo 1984
- Die Hartseerwals 1985
- Die Jare Daarna 1986
- Konflikhantering 1986
- Hoekie vir Eensames 1986
- Koos Kluities 1987
- Die Seders van Lebanon 1987
- Dot en Kie 1988
- Vleuels 1989
- Tolla is Tops 1990
- Simon en Sandra 1990
- Tough Luck 1992
- Orkney Snork Nie! (die movie): 'Dis Lekker By Die See' 1992
- Orkney Snork Nie! 2 (nog 'n movie) 1993
- Torings 1994
- Lipstiek Dipstiek 1994
- Triptiek 1997
- Onder Draai die Duiwel Rond 1997
- Kaalgat Tussen die Daisies 1997
- Arsenaal 2002
