= Willie Esterhuizen =

South African actor

- Occupation(s): Actor, director, producer
- Years active: 1982–present

Willie Esterhuizen is an Afrikaans actor, writer and director. He is known for his roles in the popular TV series Vetkoekpaleis and Gauteng-aleng-aleng.

Esterhuizen received dance training at the University of Cape Town, after which he studied drama for two years at the Arts Educational School in London. Two years later he became a member of KRUIK and moved to Johannesburg to do television work.

== Filmography ==
As director:

- Vir Beter of Baie Beter (TV-series), 2014
- Molly en Wors (TV-series)
- Stoute Boudjies, 2010
- Vaatjie sien sy gat, 2008
- Poena is Koning, 2007
- Begeertes (TV-series), 2006
- Lipstiek Dipstiek, 1994
- Orkney Snork Nie 2, 1993
- Orkney Snork Nie (Die Moevie), 1992
- Orkney Snork Nie (TV-series), 1989–1992

As writer:

- Vir Beter of Baie Beter, 2014
- Stoute Boudjies, 2010
- Vaatjie sien sy gat, 2008
- Begeertes (TV-series), 2006
- Vetkoekpaleis, 1996–2000
- Gauteng Aleng(TV-Series), 2003 - 2004
- Lipstiek Dipstiek, 1994
- Orkney Snork Nie (TV-series), 1989–1992

As actor:

- Faan se Trein, 2014
- Stoute Boudjies, 2010
- Vaatjie sien sy gat, 2008
- Liewe Hemel, Genis!, 1987 as Visser Botes (Vissertjie)
- Vetkoekpaleis, 1996–2000
- Orkney Snork Nie! Die movies as Gielie Basson
- Wie Laaste Lag, 1985 as Lafras
- Koöperasiestories (TV-series) as Vissertjie, 1983
- Wat Jy Saai, 1979 as Christiaan MacDonald

== Awards ==
- Golden Loerie Award for TV advertising (2002)
- Avanti Award for Best Actor (1999)
- Avanti Award for Best Comedy Production (1999)
- Avanti Award for Best Writer (1999)
