= Television in South Africa =

Television in South Africa was introduced in 1976. The country is notable for its late adoption of widespread television broadcasting. Although closed-circuit experiments took place in exhibits in 1929 and 1936, upon South Africa's adoption of apartheid in the mid-1940s, television was seen with massive skepticism from the ruling government, a position that lasted for nearly thirty years. During the early years of television, it was heavily regulated among ethnic lines, with whites receiving the only channel at launch, while blacks received their own channel at the end of 1981. Commercial television emerged in 1986 in the form of a subscription channel, though the SABC decided to counteract in advance with the launch of a supplementary white service on the frequencies of the black network after 9pm.

Post-apartheid, the television sector began to liberalise and several minor languages, such as Ndebele, made their first appearances on national television. The free-to-air monopoly was broken in 1998 when e.tv, the first free-to-air private television channel, opened. Currently (as of early 2026), South Africa is nearing the end of the shutdown of analogue terrestrial signals, the process of which was delayed several times and taken to court.

== History ==
=== Early developments ===
On 7 September 1928, The Star reported on the arrival of the first television experiments in South Africa, with the participation of John Logie Baird, who was negotiating an arrangement with the Schlesinger organisation to market sets. The service would start in Johannesburg by the end of the year and would subsequently expand to other South African cities over time. The first demonstration took place on 22 August 1929, being limited to members of the South African Association for the Advancement of Science (SAAAS) at the engineering laboratory of the South African College in Cape Town. Initial pictures were of poor quality and plagued by interference. A second test was conducted at the Empire Exhibition in Johannesburg in 1936. These initial experiments were seen with skepticism, with the 1936 demonstration showing concerns that television could be used for voyeurism.

The 1929 exhibition was marked by several other goals which were pivotal for the usage of television in South Africa: in addition to the participation of theatre personality Gwyneth Nelson Keys, The Sunday Times reported that it could also be used for broadcasting pictures of wanted criminals to police stations across the country. Airing of current events would put it in competition with the bioscope (movie theatres), which was the leading form of visual media at the time. There wasn't sufficient funding, as the three radio stations of the time were facing financial difficulties.

The arrival of the television equipment from London for the 1936 Empire Exhibition was delayed due to logistical problems regarding its shipment, which only arrived by 22 September, a week after its opening. The first image seen in the second tests was of a laughing girl, which the Rand Daily Mail incorrectly thought to be the first picture seen on television in South Africa, disregarding the 1929 experiments. The demonstration was held in private to a number of guests, among them representatives of the Reuters news agency. Viewers came to be televised at the exhibition; by the end of the year, 25,000 people appeared on screen as part of the experiments. F. R. Milsom foresaw the use of television to deliver news as it happened, in opposition to newspapers where the news came delayed, at the time of printing.

Despite the success of the second exhibition, the view the press had of television differed: it would not lead to an immediate launch of a television network in South Africa, and that such a service would take a long time to set up, largely due to cost issues, as well as the only possible company that set it up would be a wealthy company. The Rand Daily Mail suggested a long wait for a regular service. British firms held a demonstration of television in Johannesburg in April 1950, but it was exected that a television network would not arrive to South Africa for "several years".

=== Opposition to introduction ===
Opposition leader K. Ueckermann was the first politician to propose a television service for the SABC, submitting a question to the Minister of Posts and Telegraphs, J. F. Naudé, on 6 April 1951. The SABC had set goals for television as early as 1944, as one of its goals after the war ended.

The broadcaster later reiterated that introducing a television service was considered too costly, especially given the early global developments in television technology, whose impact was still being studied. In 1952, Naudé stated that South Africa was interested in developing its own television service in the future. However, at the time, the costs were still seen as prohibitive for the Government of South Africa.

The SABC, for its part, maintained that it was unlikely South Africa would have a television service in the near future due to the high costs associated with installing equipment, importing television sets, and producing local programmes.

The first proposal to introduce television in South Africa was made by The Rank Organisation in 1953, but it was rejected by the governing National Party. Even though the state-controlled South African Broadcasting Corporation (SABC) held a virtual monopoly on radio broadcasting, it viewed the new medium as a threat to Afrikaans and the Afrikaner volk, fearing it would give undue prominence to English and create unfair competition for the Afrikaans press.

Moreover, as the 1950s progressed, the SABC faced increasing financial difficulties. Its budget was strained by the purchase of additional land for its Auckland Park facilities, the expansion of Bantu radio services, and loans to install FM transmitters and services. These financial constraints hindered the SABC’s ambitions.

By the late-1950s, United Party member B. Wilson had argued that the idea of introducing television was no longer an "astronomical" expense. However, throughout the 1960s, the National Party maintained that the benefits of television did not justify its high operational costs. Advertising, however, was to be limited to big companies, due to high costs. This would spell a large downfall for the print industry, which would mean a mass exodus for advertisers, causing the shutdown of newspapers.

Prime Minister Hendrik Verwoerd compared television to atomic bombs and poison gas, stating, "They are modern things, but that does not mean they are desirable. The government has to watch for any dangers to the people, both spiritual and physical."

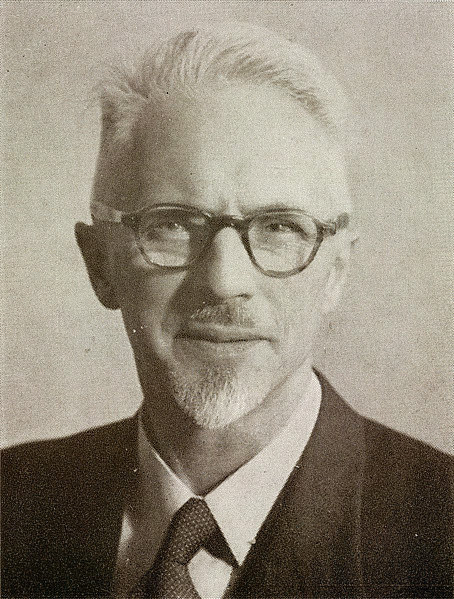
Dr. Albert Hertzog, Minister for Posts and Telegraphs 1958–1968

Dr. Albert Hertzog, the Minister for Posts and Telegraphs at the time, argued that "the effect of wrong pictures on children, the less developed, and other races can be destructive." Declaring that television would come to South Africa "over [his] dead body," Hertzog denounced it as "only a miniature bioscope which is being carried into the house and over which parents have no control."

He also claimed that "South Africa would have to import films showing race mixing, and advertising would make Africans dissatisfied with their lot."

On the other hand, the South African government had been producing filmed content for television broadcasters as far ahead as the late-1950s. The Department of Information's Television Section produced more than 200 films, which were sent to television stations in the United States, Canada, Australia, West Germany, the Netherlands, Belgium, Italy, Finland, Switzerland, Sweden, Rhodesia, France, and the United Kingdom between 1958-63.

These films featured news, interviews, and documentary segments and were viewed by millions of people, with production costs amounting to thousands of rand. While the opposition did not object to the films in principle, they questioned the government's stance on television.

However, many White South Africans, including some Afrikaners, did not share Hertzog's hostility towards what he called "the little black box." When Neil Armstrong became the first man to set foot on the Moon in 1969, South Africa was one of the few countries unable to watch the event broadcast live. This led one newspaper to remark, "The moon film has proved to be the last straw… The situation is becoming a source of embarrassment for the country."

In response to public demand, the government arranged limited viewings of the landing, allowing people to watch recorded footage for fifteen minutes.

The opposition United Party highlighted that even less economically developed countries in Africa had already introduced television.

In addition, neighbouring Southern Rhodesia had launched its own television service in 1960, becoming the first country in Africa south of the equator to do so. Known as Rhodesia Television (RTV), its major shareholders included South African companies, such as the Argus Group of newspapers through its subsidiary, the Rhodesian Printing and Publishing Company, as well as Davenport and Meyer, which also operated LM Radio, based in Mozambique, then under Portuguese rule.

Commenting on Rhodesia's experience with television, Ivor Benson, who served as Director of the Government Information Department under Ian Smith, remarked that the South African government "had been wise to stand firm against a great deal of well-organised pressure and to insist on waiting until some means might be found of separating television from some of the evils which have attended it in other countries."

In the absence of television in South Africa, a radio adaptation of the British television series The Avengers was produced by Sonovision for the SABC's commercial network, Springbok Radio, in 1972. Although it ran for only 18 months, the series proved highly popular.

In 1968, the government's opposition to the introduction of television began to soften after Hertzog was removed as Minister for Posts and Telegraphs by Prime Minister John Vorster.

In 1971, the government appointed a "Commission of Inquiry into Matters Relating to Television," headed by Piet Meyer, chairman of the Afrikaner Broederbond and later of the SABC. A majority of the commission's members, nine of whom were Broederbond members, recommended that a television service be introduced, provided that "effective control" was exercised "to the advantage of our nation and country."

The commission also argued that people in South Africa would eventually be able to receive foreign television broadcasts via satellite, thereby bypassing government censorship. It suggested that this should be pre-empted through the introduction of a domestic service.

Additionally, it would be inconceivable for the Publications Control Board to censor each video cassette that entered the country once they became available in large quantities.

=== Introduction of television ===
The SABC was finally allowed to introduce a television service, scheduled for 1975. Initially, the 1971 proposal was for two television channels—one in English and Afrikaans, alternating between the two languages and aimed at White audiences, and another, known as TV Bantu, aimed at Black viewers. TV Bantu never launched.

The transmitter network switched on in early 1975 to deliver the first test cards in order to prepare for the test phase a few months later. Test transmissions in Johannesburg began on 5 May 1975, followed by test broadcasts in Cape Town and Durban in July. Nationwide services finally commenced on 5 January 1976, with only one channel, the English/Afrikaans service. On its first day on air, there were 220,000 television sets for a total of approximately one million viewers.

The first broadcast started at 6pm with a bilingual introduction from Afrikaans presenter Heinrich Maritz:

It is 5 January 1976. We welcome you to the opening night of the full television service of the SABC. For us, it is an exceptional event, and we are pleased to let you share, from tonight, the results of the past five years' planning and preparations.

This was continued by the English presenter Dorianne Berry:

And because tonight is just that little bit special, we thought it might be appropriate to deviate slightly from our planned programme pattern – just to give you an idea of the variety and scope of our new service.

The first programme was A Special Programme in the Wielie Walie Speelkamer, an introductory programme to the children's productions of the SABC, featuring Haas Das (Riaan Cruywagen) introducing himself to the characters and co-workers of the SABC Children and Youth Programmes unit. Haas Das se Nuuskas quickly became one of the most popular programmes, among both children and adults. The launch night was followed by The Everywhere Express, which had been shown in the SABC TV test phase in the previous year. After the introduction to children's programmes, viewers saw what to expect from SABC TV in terms of documentaries and dramas. There was also news, sport, comedy and drama, including the airing of the first episode of The Bob Newhart Show and the documentary Camera I. The first news bulletins were also shown that day, read in English by Michael de Morgan and in Afrikaans by Cor Nortjé. At 8pm, prime minister B. J. Vorster made an official bilingual announcement regarding the opening of the network, stating that it was still too early to predict what influence would television have in South Africa. His outline for South African television was to "provide fresh and correct information, and healthy entertainment, and to be part of the education of the nation", that the SABC would provide "objectivity and balance" and to "bring the world to South Africa". There was also a variety show produced specifically for the first night, Knicky Knacky Knoo, which H. J. Fischer compared to quality overseas programming.

In common with most of Western Europe, South Africa used the PAL system for colour television, becoming only the second terrestrial television service in sub-Saharan Africa to launch with a colour-only service. Zanzibar in Tanzania had introduced the first such service in 1973. (Tanzania itself did not establish a television service until the early 1990s, similarly concerned about the expense and perceived threat to cultural norms.)

The government, advised by SABC technicians, took the view that colour television would have to be available to avoid a costly migration from black-and-white broadcasting technology.

It became apparent that from the beginning, television in South Africa was a mere propaganda tool favouring the government. Public perception of the first night favoured entertainment programming. Even Haas Das became more popular than the real newsreaders.

Initially, the TV service was funded entirely through a licence fee, similar to the United Kingdom, charged at R36. Advertising began on 1 January 1978.

=== Emergence of TV2/TV3 and M-Net ===
On 31 December 1981, two services were introduced: TV2, broadcasting in Zulu and Xhosa, and TV3, broadcasting in Sotho and Tswana, aimed at a Black urban audience. The existing SABC TV channel was renamed TV1. In 1985, a new service called TV4 was introduced, carrying sports and entertainment programming, using the TV2 and TV3 broadcast channels, which then had to end transmission at 21:00.

In 1992, TV2, TV3, and TV4 were combined into a new service called CCV (Contemporary Community Values). A third channel, known as TSS (Topsport Surplus Sport), was introduced, with Topsport being the brand name for the SABC's sports coverage. However, this was replaced by NNTV (National Network TV), an educational, non-commercial channel, in 1994.

The main channel, now called TV1, was divided evenly between English and Afrikaans, as before. It also became available in Walvis Bay, an enclave of South Africa in Namibia, which was then under South African administration. A live feed of the channel was broadcast via Intelsat and retransmitted on a local low-power repeater.

In 1986, the SABC's monopoly was challenged by the launch of a subscription-based service known as M-Net, backed by a consortium of newspaper publishers, on 1 October. However, as part of M-Net’s licensing restrictions, it could not broadcast news programmes, which remained the preserve of the SABC. Despite this, M-Net began broadcasting a current affairs programme called Carte Blanche in 1988.

As the state-controlled broadcaster, the SABC was accused of bias towards the apartheid regime, providing only limited coverage of opposition politicians.

=== Bantustans ===
The bantustan of Bophuthatswana was served by Bop TV (31 December 1983) and Mmabatho Television (1990), both established by the Bophuthatswana Broadcasting Corporation (BopBC). Not long after Bop TV started, Ciskei started a privately-owned TBN station (TBN Ciskei) and Transkei started an M-Net affiliate under a public-private arrangement (M-Net Transkei).

== Programming ==
=== Imported programming ===
Many imported programmes were dubbed into Afrikaans, some of the first being the British detective series The Sweeney (known in Afrikaans as Blitspatrollie) and Van der Valk, as well as the puppet series Thunderbirds. However, in July 1986, to accommodate English speakers, the SABC began to simulcast the original soundtrack of American series on an FM radio service called Radio 2000. These included Miami Vice (known as Misdaad in Miami).

This also applied to German and Dutch programmes dubbed in Afrikaans, such as the German detective series Derrick, and the Dutch soap opera Medisch Centrum West, known in Afrikaans as Hospitaal Wes Amsterdam.

Similarly, many programmes, such as The Jeffersons, were dubbed into Zulu.

Owing to South Africa's apartheid policies, the British Actors' Equity Association started a boycott of programme sales to South Africa. This, combined with a similar boycott by Australia, meant that South African TV was dominated by programming from the United States. As a result, it was only after the end of apartheid that the boycott was lifted and non-US programming became much more widely available.

However, some US production companies, such as Lorimar, withdrew series like Knots Landing and Falcon Crest from South African circulation, while the transmission of the Academy Awards ceremony to South Africa was also banned.

=== Local programming ===
The first locally produced TV programmes in South Africa were in English and Afrikaans. English-language programmes included the family drama series The Dingleys and The Villagers, as well as the comedy series Biltong and Potroast, featuring South African and British comedians, and the variety programme The Knicky Knacky Knoo Show. Other programmes included the children's series Bangalory Time, the music series Pop Shop, and the sports programme Sportsview.

Afrikaans programmes included the comedy series Nommer Asseblief and Die Bosveldhotel, which were later made into feature films. Children's programmes included puppet shows, such as Haas Das se Nuuskas and Liewe Heksie. Other programmes in Afrikaans included the sports programme Sportfokus and the music programme Musik en Liriek.

However, it was the Zulu-language comedy 'Sgudi 'Snaysi that achieved the SABC's highest viewing figures in the late 1980s. It was also shown in Zimbabwe and Swaziland.

The drama series Shaka Zulu, based on the true story of the Zulu warrior King Shaka, was shown around the world in the 1980s. However, this was only possible because the SABC had licensed the series to a US distributor.

Since the end of apartheid, some South African-produced programmes have been shown internationally, such as SABC 3's sci-fi/drama series Charlie Jade, a co-production between the Imaginarium and Canada's CHUM. It has been broadcast in over 20 countries, including Japan, France, South Korea, and in the United States on the Sci-Fi Channel.

M-Net's soap opera Egoli: Place of Gold was shown in 43 African countries and was even exported to Venezuela, where it was dubbed in Spanish. Venezolana de Televisión aired 130 episodes from a package of 260 episodes in 1998.

== Political change ==
Following the easing of media censorship under State President F. W. de Klerk, the SABC's news coverage moved towards being more objective, although many feared that once the African National Congress (ANC) came to power, the SABC would revert to type and serve the government of the day. However, starting on 15 March 1993, the SABC also carried CNN International after regular transmission ended, throughout the night, thereby giving South African viewers new sources of international news. This was followed by a further agreement with Sky News, with the SABC channels gaining access to a live feed for eleven to twelve hours a day from 15 September.

When the Equity ban was lifted in late 1993, both M-Net and the SABC decided to buy a heavy number of British imports, much to the irritation of the local film and television production scene.

On 4 February 1996, two years after the ANC came to power, the SABC reorganised its three TV channels to be more representative of different language groups. This resulted in the downgrading of Afrikaans' status by reducing its airtime from 50% to 15%, a move that alienated many Afrikaans speakers.

SABC TV programmes in Afrikaans and other languages are now subtitled in English, but programmes in English are not usually subtitled in other languages, as the perception is that all South Africans understand English.

Previously, subtitling was confined to productions such as operas and operettas. It was not used on TV1, on the assumption that most viewers understood both Afrikaans and English, nor on CCV, despite presenters using two or more different languages during a single segment.

== New services ==
The launch of PanAmSat's PAS-4 satellite saw the introduction of Ku band direct-broadcast satellite broadcasting services on 2 October 1995, soon after MultiChoice launched DStv. This was known as Kusatcom and most of the beneficiaries were blacks living in rural areas. Two years later, the SABC launched its ill-fated satellite channels, AstraPlus and AstraSport, which were intended to catapult the corporation into the Pay TV market, called AstraSat. However, a lack of financial backers and the initial insistence on using analogue technology instead of digital technology led to their failure.

The SABC's monopoly on free-to-air terrestrial television was broken with the introduction of the privately owned channel e.tv in 1998. e.tv was backed by Midi-E Television, the defeated competitors were: Afrimedia (which lacked a foreign partner), Community Television Network (backed by Canadian company UTV International Holdings), Free To Air (backed by British company United News and Media and the Swedish Modern Times Group), New Channel Television (backed by TF1) and Station for the Nation (established in 1996, where the Nine Network held 20% of the shares). e.tv also provided the first local television news service outside of the SABC stable, although M-Net's parent company, MultiChoice, offers services such as CNN International, BBC World News, and Sky News via direct-broadcast satellite as part of its paid offering.

The first 24-hour local business channel, CNBC Africa, was launched in 2007 with eight hours of local programming, with the remainder pulled from other CNBC affiliates. CNBC Africa competes with Summit, a business television station owned by media group Avusa, which broadcasts only during evening prime time. Both stations are available only on the MultiChoice direct-to-home platform, although the inclusion of CNBC Africa in the offerings of new satellite players seems a near certainty.

In November 2007, regulators announced the award of four new broadcast licences following a process that saw 18 applications. The successful applicants were Walking on Water, a dedicated Christian service; On Digital Media, a broad-spectrum entertainment offering; e.sat, a satellite service from e.tv; and Telkom Media, a company 66% owned by telecommunications operator Telkom Group Ltd. The MultiChoice licence was renewed at the same time.

e.sat decided not to launch services but rather adopt a content provider business model. e.sat launched eNCA, a 24-hour news channel, in 2008 on the MultiChoice platform. Telkom Media, which was also granted an IPTV licence, decided in April 2009 not to pursue the launch of television services, as its parent company Telkom did not believe adequate investment returns could be achieved, and it was liquidated. The remaining licensees were expected to be operational by late 2009, and all would operate direct-to-home services using standard small-aperture satellite dishes.

On Digital Media announced on 18 March 2010 that it would be launching TopTV in May 2010 as a second pay satellite TV competitor. TopTV would offer a total of 55 channels, with 25 channels in its basic offering.

On 30 April 2013, shareholders of On Digital Media voted to approve China-based company StarTimes taking over a 20% share of ODM. By doing so, StarTimes effectively acquired a 65% economic interest in ODM. The vote also included the adoption of a business rescue plan.

TopTV was officially rebranded as StarSat on 31 October 2013. The new packages and channels associated with the rebrand were made available on 1 December 2013.

On 15 October 2013, eMedia Investments launched South Africa's first free-to-view platform, Openview, consisting of 18 channels, including additional e.tv channels.

On 31 March 2018, M-Net shut down its analogue signal to its last remaining legacy subscribers, who were redirected to DStv and GOtv.

The end of analogue TV in South Africa has been delayed several times, before ultimately deciding for 31 March 2025. However, two weeks before the shutdown, the issue was taken to the courts, as there was no previous consultation with the regulators. After e.tv succeeded in leading court action, it was delayed again to a later date.

== Community television ==
Another model of public service television, known as community television, was introduced to South Africa in the early 1990s. The impetus for this form of television arose from a desire to overcome the divisions and imbalances in broadcasting resulting from apartheid. An important conference held in the Netherlands in 1991 saw a broad range of NGOs and community groups resolve that the full diversity of the country should be expressed in its broadcasting. Subsequently, community television was introduced to South Africa through legislation known as the Independent Broadcasting Authority Act of 1993. The act enabled three tiers of broadcasting: public, commercial, and community.

While many community radio stations sprang up from that time, initially in Durban and Cape Town, community television was initially only permitted for temporary event licences of up to four weeks in duration. It was only after the national broadcasting regulator, the Independent Communications Authority of South Africa (ICASA), promulgated its position paper on community television in 2004 that longer-term licences, of up to one year, were introduced. This licensing regime was revised in 2010, when the duration for class licences was set at seven years.

Community television stations must, by law: a) serve a particular community; b) be run by a non-profit organisation; and c) involve members of the community in the selection and production of programming. Issues surrounding frequency availability are complicated by the migration to digital broadcasting, which led ICASA to declare a moratorium on considering new community TV licence applications in March 2010.

The first community television station to receive a one-year licence was Soweto TV in 2007. The station serves the southern Johannesburg region, primarily Soweto, and is also available by satellite on the MultiChoice platform. The second community television licence was granted to Cape Town TV, which was first licensed in 2008. The station serves the greater Cape Town metro region.

In addition to the above-mentioned services, a channel called Bay TV (now known as Mpuma Kapa TV and available only on DStv) started in Port Elizabeth, Tshwane TV in Pretoria, and 1KZN TV in Richards Bay. All of these channels held seven-year 'class' licences. In 2014, these channels collectively reached an audience of around 12 million viewers, and all are carried both terrestrially on local analogue frequencies as well as nationally on pay-TV platforms, principally DStv. In 2013, Alex TV launched on the OpenView platform, serving residents of Gauteng, and lasted for two years.

== Regional television ==
Following the 1996 reforms, the SABC introduced three regional opt-outs, airing on weeknights at 6-6:30pm on SABC 2:

- Cape @ Six for the Western Cape, Xhosa on Mondays and Wednesdays, Afrikaans on Tuesdays and Thursdays, English on Fridays
- KZN Tonight for KwaZulu-Natal, Zulu on Mondays and Thursdays, English on Tuesdays and Fridays, Afrikaans on Wednesdays
- Mopame for Limpopo and Mpumalanga, Swati and Ndebele on Mondays and Wednesdays, Sepedi and Venda on Tuesdays, English and Afrikaans on Thursdays, Tsonga and Sepedi on Fridays

These services were broadcast as break-away output from the national schedule. Often, stories that were featured in these bulletins would end up airing on the national SABC News bulletins. Despite these problems, these services were popular, but the cost of producing was higher than the national news. After an external survey conducted by McKinsey, Cape @ Six and KZN Tonight were terminated in 2001 and Mopame followed in 2003. Gauteng was excluded from the study because it had access to Bop TV (which the SABC acquired in the mid-90s) but eventually shut down in March 2003 after a cabinet decision.

Following the closure of these services, ICASA announced plans to introduce regional television stations into South Africa, having granted frequencies for potential stations in 2003, but nothing concrete came out of the plan.

== Digital technology ==
The first digital television implementation in South Africa was a satellite-based system launched by pay-TV operator MultiChoice in 1995. On 22 February 2007, the South African government announced that the country's public TV operators would begin broadcasting in digital by 1 November 2008, followed by a three-year dual-illumination period that would end on 1 November 2011.

On 11 August 2008, the Department of Communications announced its Broadcasting Digital Migration Policy. The policy governs the switchover from analogue to digital transmission and states that the department will provide funding to the national signal distributor, Sentech, to begin the migration process according to the published timetable. The timetable was phased as follows, which was a delay of 4 years from the original proposal:

- 8 August 2008 – MultiChoice launches South Africa's first HDTV channel (DStv channel 170)
- 2013 – Begin digital transmissions (DTV)
- 2015 – ~100% digital coverage and switch-off of all remaining analogue transmitters

The government had a goal to have digital television, as well as mobile television, up and running in time for the South Africa-hosted 2010 FIFA World Cup. However, it ran into political complications, along with private broadcasters agitating for certain television standards.

On 14 January 2011, the South African Department of Communications chose the European standard DVB-T2 as the digital television standard in South Africa, following the trend set by several African nations.

The August 2008 digital migration project remains delayed, and the analogue switch-off remains uncertain. On 5 December 2024 Communications Minister Solly Malatsi had set the analogue switch-off deadline to 31 March 2025, but it was suspended by the Pretoria High Court just a few days before the deadline. Stakeholders that include eMedia and organisations like Media Monitoring Africa and the SOS Coalition argued that unless rational consultation could be made, millions of South Africans would no longer have access to broadcast television after the switch-off.

== Satellite television ==
South African-based MultiChoice's DStv is the main digital satellite television provider in Sub-Saharan Africa, broadcasting principally in English, but also in Portuguese, Hindi, German, and Afrikaans.

In May 2010, On Digital Media launched the TopTV satellite television service. It offers a number of South African and international television channels and broadcasts principally in English, but also in Hindi, Portuguese, and Afrikaans. The platform rebranded to StarSat later in 2013.

In October 2013, eMedia Investments launched its free-to-view platform, OpenView HD, offering both local and international programming.

== Other technologies ==
There are no cable television networks in South Africa, as maintaining a cable network is expensive due to the need to cover larger and more sparsely populated areas. MMDS was previously used in South Africa for business and educational TV services, but since the introduction of Ku-band satellite transmissions in 1995, most MMDS transmitters have been dismantled.

== Most-viewed channels ==
Source: South African Audience Research Foundation (2025/ 2026)

Position	Channel	Group	Monthly reach (%)
1	SABC 1	South African Broadcasting Corporation	85%
2	SABC 2	South African Broadcasting Corporation	84%
3	e.tv	Hosken Consolidated Investments	81%
4	SABC 3	South African Broadcasting Corporation	76%
5	Newzroom Afrika	Ngwato Nkosi Group	40%
6	M-Net Movies	M-Net	19%
7	Studio Universal	NBCUniversal International Networks	18%
8	Mzansi Magic	DStv	17%
9	Channel O	M-Net	16%
10	Mzansi Wethu	DStv	15%

== See also ==
- List of South African television series
- List of television stations in South Africa
