= List of Australian child actors =

This is a list of child actors from Australia. Films and/or television series they appeared in are mentioned only if they were still a child at the time of filming.

Current child actors (under the age of eighteen) are indicated by boldface.

== A ==
- Daniel Amalm (born 1979)
  - Home and Away (1994–1999, 2000)

== B ==
- Morgan Baker (born 1997)
  - Neighbours (2008–2017, 2017)
- Jordana Beatty (born 1998)
  - Life Support (2002)
  - All Saints (2005)
  - Superman Returns (2006)
  - Home and Away (2007)
  - Legend of the Seeker (2009)
  - Judy Moody and the Not Bummer Summer (2011)
  - Mind Over Maddie (2013)
- Charlotte Best (born 1994)
  - Home & Away (2007-2020)
- **Alyla Browne** (born 2010)
  - Mr Inbetween (2019)
  - Children of the Corn (2020)
  - Sonic the Hedgehog 3 (2024)

== C ==
- Ryan Clark (born 1983)
  - Home and Away (1991-2003, 2004, 2005)
  - Our Lips Are Sealed (2002)
  - White Collar Blue (2003)
  - Bondi Rescue (2006)
  - The Black Balloon (2008)
- Sasha Close (born 1973)
  - Neighbours (1987–1989)
- Jamie Croft (born 1981)
  - Mighty Morphin Power Rangers: The Movie (1995)
- Teagan Croft (born 2004)
  - Home and Away (2016)
  - Titans (2018)

== D ==
- Morgan Davies (born 2001/02)
  - Green Fire Envy (2008)
  - The Tree (2010)
  - The Hunter (2011)
  - Julian (short film, 2012)
  - Growing Up (short film, 2013)
  - Kharisma (short film, 2014)
  - Breath (short film, 2014)
  - Devil's Playground (2014)
  - The Boyfriend Game (short film, 2015, also second assistant director)
  - Hench (short film, 2015)
  - The Girlfriend Experience (2017)
  - Calliope's Prelude (2019)
  - Storm Boy (2019)
  - The End (2020)
  - Beautiful They (2021)
- Olivia DeJonge (born 1998)
  - Hiding (2015)
  - The Visit (2015)
  - Scare Campaign (2016)
  - Better Watch Out (2017)
  - Will (2017)
  - Stray Dolls (2019)
  - Josie & Jack (2019)
  - The Society (2019)
  - Elvis (2021)
- Matt Doran (born 1976)
  - Home and Away (1991–1996)
  - The Thin Red Line (1998)
  - The Matrix (1999)
  - Star Wars: Episode II – Attack of the Clones (2002)
  - Macbeth (2006)
  - Next Door to the Valinskys (2008)
  - Battle of the Damned (2012)

== E ==
- Anthony Engelman (born 1974)
  - Pugwall (1989–1991)
- Indiana Evans (born 1990)
  - Snobs (2003–2004)
  - Home and Away (2004–2008)

== F ==
- Rhiannon Fish (born 1991)
  - Neighbours (2003–2005)
  - As the Bell Rings (2007–2009)
- Amelia Frid (born 1975)
  - Neighbours (1989–1991)

== G ==
- Nicholas Gledhill (born 1975)
  - Careful, He Might Hear You (1983)
  - Bodyline (miniseries) (1984)
  - A Country Practice (1984)
- Melissa George (born 1976)
  - Home and Away (1993–1996)
- Ben Guerens (born 1979)
  - Neighbours (1990–1993)
  - Body Melt (1993)

== H ==
- Anthony Hammer (born 1987)
  - Neighbours (2001–2002)
  - Bootleg (TV series) (2002)
- **India Rose Hemsworth** (born 2012)
  - Thor: Love and Thunder (2022)
  - Avengers: Doomsday (2026)
- Liam Hemsworth (born 1990)
  - Home and Away (1 episode, 2007)
  - McLeod's Daughters (1 episode, 2007)
  - Neighbours (25 episodes, 2007-2008)
  - The Elephant Princess (18 episodes, 2008-2009)
- Lauren Hewett (born 1981)
  - Halfway Across the Galaxy and Turn Left (1991)
  - Home and Away (1996, 1999)
- Nicholas Hamilton (born 2000)
  - Danger Close: The Battle of Long Tan (2019)

== J ==
- Kaiya Jones (born 1996)
  - The Saddle Club (2008–2009)
  - Neighbours (2009–2014)

== K ==
- Angela Keep (born 1981)
  - Hey Dad..! (1993–1994)
  - Home and Away (1995)
- Marny Kennedy (born 1994)
  - Mortified (TV series) (2006–2007)
  - The Saddle Club (TV series) (2008–2009)

== L ==
- **Diesel La Torraca** (born 2011)
  - Little Monsters (2019)
  - Lambs of God (2019)
- Heath Ledger (1979–2008)
  - Clowning Around (1995)
  - Sweat (1996)
  - Paws (1997)
  - Home and Away (1997)
  - Roar (1997)
  - 10 Things I Hate About You (1999)
  - Two Hands (1999)
  - The Patriot (2000)
  - A Knight's Tale (2001)
  - Monster's Ball (2001)
  - The Four Feathers (2002)
  - Ned Kelly (2003)
  - The Order (2003)
  - Lords of Dogtown (2005)
  - The Brothers Grimm (2005)
  - Brokeback Mountain (2005)
  - Casanova (2005)
  - Candy (2006)
  - I'm Not There (2007)
  - The Dark Knight (2008)
  - The Imaginarium of Doctor Parnassus (2009)

== M ==
- Indiana Massara (born 2002)
  - Chicken Girls (2017-2023)
  - Attaway Appeal (2017)
- Callan McAuliffe (born 1995)
  - Flipped (2010)
  - Cloudstreet (2011)
  - I Am Number Four (2011)
- Cleo Massey (born 1993)
  - H_{2}O: Just Add Water (2006–2010)
- Levi Miller (born 2002)
  - Pan (2015)
  - Better Watch Out (2016)
  - Red Dog: True Blue (2016)
  - Jasper Jones (2017)
  - American Exit (2019)
- Maia Mitchell (born 1993)
  - Mortified (2006–2007)
  - Trapped (2008–2009)
  - K-9 (2009)
  - Castaway (2011)
- Ryan Moloney (born 1979)
  - Body Melt (1993)
  - Neighbours (1994, 1995–2022)
- Sarah Monahan (born 1977)
  - Sons and Daughters (1986)
  - Hey Dad..! (1986–1993)
  - Home and Away (1995)
- Dacre Montgomery (born 1994)
  - Betrand the Terrible (2011)

== O ==
- Fletcher O'Leary (born 1997)
  - Neighbours (2007–2009)
- Ed Oxenbould (born 2001)
  - Julian (2012)
  - Alexander and the Terrible, Horrible, No Good, Very Bad Day (2014)
  - Paper Planes (2015)
  - The Visit (2015)
  - Better Watch Out (2016)
  - The Butterfly Tree (2017)
  - Wildlife (2018)

== P ==
- Mouche Phillips (born 1973)
  - Playing Beatie Bow (1986)
  - Princess Kate (1988)
  - Dadah Is Death (1988)
  - Home and Away (1989–1990)
- Colin Petersen (1946-2024)
  - Smiley (1956)
  - The Scamp (1957)
  - A Cry From The Streets (1958)

== R ==
- Angourie Rice (born 2000)
  - Black Mirror (2019)
  - Spider-Man: Far From Home (2019)
  - Every Day (2018)
  - Jasper Jones (2017)
  - The Doctor Blake Mysteries (2014)
- Kate Ritchie (born 1978)
  - Cyclone Tracy (1986)
  - Home and Away (1988–2008)
- Rebecca Ritters (born 1984)
  - Neighbours (1992–1999, 2005)
- Jordan Rodrigues (born 1992)
  - Home and Away (2008–2009)
  - Dance Academy (2008–2009)
- Justin Rosniak (born 1977)
  - Home and Away (1988, 1995)

== S ==
- Everlyn Sampi (born 1988)
  - Rabbit-Proof Fence (2002)
- Kristian Schmid (born 1974)
  - Neighbours (1988–1992)
  - The Tomorrow People (1992–1995)
- Jansen Spencer (born 1981)
  - Neighbours (1997–2001, 2005)
- Jesse Spencer (born 1979)
  - Neighbours (1994–2000, 2005)
- Caitlin Stasey (born 1990)
  - Neighbours (2005–2009)
  - The Sleepover Club (2003, 2007)

== T ==
- Rod Taylor (1930-2015)
  - The Time Machine (1960)
  - One Hundred and One Dalmatians (1961)
  - The Birds (1963)
- Eliza Taylor (born 1989)
  - Neighbours (2003, 2005–2008)
- Jiordan Anna Tolli (born 1994)
  - Neighbours (1994–2001)
- Jason Torrens (born 1975)
  - Pugwall (1989)

== W ==
- Jeffrey Walker (born 1982)
  - House Rules (1988)
  - The Flying Doctors (1989)
  - Pugwall (1991)
  - Round the Twist (1993)
  - Police Rescue (1993)
  - Halfway Across the Galaxy and Turn Left (1994)
  - Ocean Girl (1994–1997)
  - The Wayne Manifesto (1995–1997)
  - Thunderstone (1999–2000)
- Matthew Werkmeister (born 1992)
  - Neighbours (2005–2011)
- Tamsin West (born 1974)
  - Neighbours (1987–1988, 1991)
  - Round the Twist (1989)
- Adam Willits (born 1972)
  - Home and Away (1988–1991, 1995–1996, 1997, 1998, 2000, 2002, 2003, 2008)

== Y ==
- Breanna Yde (born 2003)
  - The Haunted Hathaways (2013–15)
  - Santa Hunters (2014)
  - School of Rock (2016–18)
  - Escape from Mr. Lemoncello's Library (2017)
  - All I Want for Christmas Is You (2017)
  - Malibu Rescue (2019)
