= Bop TV =

South African television station (1994–2003)

- Country: Bophuthatswana (until 1994); South Africa (1994–2003)
- Broadcast area: Bophuthatswana (until 1994); South Africa (1994–2003)

Programming
- Languages: Tswana (Use in some programs), English

Ownership
- Owner: Bophuthatswana Broadcasting Corporation (until 1998); SABC (1998–2003)
- Sister channels: Mmabatho Television (until 1998)

History
- Launched: 31 December 1983; 42 years ago
- Closed: 31 July 2003; 23 years ago

Bop TV was a television station owned by the Bophuthatswana Broadcasting Corporation, which operated from 1983 to 2003. Initially confined to the black homeland of Bophuthatswana (which included townships near Johannesburg and Pretoria), the channel found its foothold by means of signal overspill, becoming an attractive alternative to the existing SABC and later M-Net channels. Following the end of apartheid and the dissolution of Bophuthatswana, it was integrated into the South African Broadcasting Corporation, after which it shut down.

== History ==
Commencing operations in on 31 December 1983, primarily it transmitted imported programmes in an unedited form, allowing all comical references to race issues to be aired. While initially intended for the Bophuthatswana homeland, it was later relayed from the Johannesburg TV transmitter toward Soweto, on the UHF band. The first programme seen was reportedly a Woody Woodpecker cartoon. The station was founded by an American, who worked with a British deputy, Robin Welch, from Bristol.

In the apartheid era, a small number of white people who were able to receive unintentional overspill watched Bop TV, which offered alternative entertainment and current affairs programming to the state-controlled South African Broadcasting Corporation, even though the signal was transmitted in a tight beam from the main Johannesburg TV transmitter toward Soweto. It was strongly recommended that the signals were to be limited to areas with a high Tswana population. Unlike the three SABC channels available at the time (TV1, TV2, and in the case of eastern South Africa TV3), which broadcast on the VHF band with horizontal polarity in Johannesburg (channels 6, 9, and 13), Bop TV broadcast over the UHF band with vertical polarity in Johannesburg (channel 37). Furthermore, both Bop TV and the SABC had set up an agreement whereby each side would not broadcast opinions contrary to the other. While the SABC had no jurisdiction over the independent homeland of Bophuthathswana, if Bop TV violated those agreements, the SABC would shut off the Johannesburg relay. Within three months of its founding, Bop TV rapidly overtook the SABC channels in terms of ratings. The channel was set up by Tim Ellis, who also assisted in the creation of the SABC's TV4 in 1984 (which went live after the 9pm closing time for both TV2 and TV3) and later M-Net. Beginning in 1985, it started carrying the Edutel pilot project, which became a full service in 1986; in 1991, Edutel moved to Mmabatho Television, while its airtime on Bop TV was replaced by its Music TV service.

The signals were restricted to within Bophuthatswana in 1986 following the rapid success of its broadcasts by means of overspill to parts of South Africa; the restrictions were put to place after the ITU recommended that the station considered as a "foreign broadcaster" in South Africa. There could be no overspill from Bophuthatswana to major cities like Johannesburg, Pretoria, or Soweto, since Bophuthatswana was hundreds of kilometres away. However, from the Johannesburg transmitter beamed toward the intended target of Soweto, there was some overspill into south-western Johannesburg suburbs Bop TV started satellite broadcasts in 1988, using a satellite from the Intelsat IV fleet for that purpose. The channel was even carried in the early years of cable television in Israel and was the primary way Israel saw CNN International during the Gulf War, being removed over concerns due to its American imports, program contracts and the refusal of the Israeli cable companies to pay for its reception.

By 1990, Bop TV was received by some 350,000 television sets in its coverage area, for a daily schedule of nine hours. The channel was already interested in buying new series such as The Simpsons (before it even premiered on M-Net) and The Arsenio Hall Show, but the prices for such were expensive. Its executives were in screening sessions from numerous production companies, including American juggernauts.

A post-apartheid reshuffling of the SABC in 1996 resulted in the former bantustan broadcasters being integrated into it. This infuriated the bosses of Bop Broadcasting. During the late 90s, it was used to provide training for prospective Botswana Television staff.

In 1997, the State Reorganisation Act led to the creation of subsidies for the former bantustan broadcasters that were now under the SABC's control. The said subsidy ended in November 2001. From then onward, the SABC was now funding Bop Broadcasting in its entirety. The channel started airing the Setswana SABC news bulletin at 9pm on 4 January 2000, coinciding with changes to SABC2's primetime schedule. In 2003, the SABC announced that they would shut the channel down on 31 July. After its closure, the SABC planned to use its infrastructure for a regional broadcasting base.

== Network ==
During the 1990s, Bop TV broadcast on the following UHF transmitters:

- Bethanie: channel 44
- Brixton: channel 37
- Ganyesa: channel 42
- Itoseng: channel 59
- Kameelsdrift: channel 36
- Kuruman: channel 56
- Mabopane: channel 54
- Madibogo: channel 55
- Madikwe: channel 26
- Makadima: channel 54
- Mmabatho: channel 24
- Mogwase: channel 66
- Motswedi: channel 45
- Pankop: channel 64
- Pilanesburg: channel 57
- Taung: channel 39
- Thabanchu: channel 67
- Tihabane: channel 40

== List of programmes ==
=== Domestic ===
==== Music ====
- South Africa Music TV
- South Africa On the Beat

==== Lifestyle ====
- South Africa Panorama

==== Children's ====
- South Africa Adventures at the Waterhole
- South Africa Teeny Bop

==== Sports ====
- South Africa Bop Sports

==== Horse racing ====
- South Africa See How They Run

==== News & current affairs ====
- Bop TV News (until 2000)
- South Africa SABC Dikgang (from 2000)

==== Talk shows ====
- South Africa Rhema Church Hour

==== Drama ====
- South Africa Stolen Lives

==== Game show ====
- South Africa Moving Up Quiz

==== Education ====
- South Africa Edutel

=== Foreign ===
==== Comedy ====
- United States America's Funniest Home Videos
- United States America's Funniest People
- United Kingdom Are You Being Served?
- United States The Army Show
- United States Batman
- United States Benson
- Canada Bizarre
- United States Brooklyn Bridge
- United Kingdom Brush Strokes
- Canada Check It Out!
- United States Cheers
- Scotland, United Kingdom City Lights
- United States Diff'rent Strokes
- United Kingdom Don't Wait Up
- United Kingdom Drop the Dead Donkey
- United States The Dukes of Hazzard
- United Kingdom Executive Stress
- United Kingdom Ever Decreasing Circles
- United Kingdom Father Charlie
- United Kingdom French Fields
- United Kingdom Fresh Fields
- United States The Fresh Prince of Bel-Air
- United States Full House
- United States Get a Life
- United States Gimme a Break!
- United Kingdom The Good Life
- United Kingdom Goodnight Sweetheart
- United Kingdom Grace and Favour
- Australia Hampton Court
- United States Harry
- United Kingdom Health and Efficiency
- United Kingdom Heartburn Hotel
- Australia Hey Dad..!
- United States Hit Squad
- United Kingdom Joint Account
- United Kingdom Keep It in the Family
- United Kingdom Keeping Up Appearances
- United States Ladies Man
- United Kingdom Last of the Summer Wine
- Canada Material World
- Canada Max Glick
- United States Moesha
- Australia Mother and Son
- United Kingdom Murder Most Horrid
- United Kingdom Never the Twain
- United States Night Court
- United Kingdom Oh, Doctor Beeching!
- United States Out of This World
- United States Private Benjamin
- United States Punky Brewster
- United States The Redd Foxx Show
- United Kingdom Rich Tea and Symphony
- United States Seinfeld
- United Kingdom Some Mothers Do 'Ave 'Em
- United States Spencer
- United States The Ted Knight Show
- United Kingdom Three Up, Two Down
- United States Three's Company
- United States Three's a Crowd
- United Kingdom To the Manor Born
- United Kingdom Valentine Park
- United Kingdom Very Big Very Soon
- United States Webster
- Australia Willing and Abel
- United Kingdom Whose Line Is It Anyway?
- United Kingdom 'Allo 'Allo!

==== Anthology ====
- United States Ghost Story
- United States The Hitchhiker
- United States In the Name of Love
- United Kingdom Murder Most Horrid
- United States Monsters
- United States Night Flight
- United States Project U.F.O.
- United States Shadow Theater

==== Western ====
- United States The Big Valley
- Canada, France Bordertown
- United States Empire
- United States Father Murphy
- United States Kung Fu
- United States Lonesome Dove: The Series
- United States The Lone Ranger
- Canada Queen of Swords

==== News ====
- United States Sightings

==== Drama ====
- United States 21 Jump Street
- United States 240-Robert
- United Kingdom 99-1
- United States, Mexico Acapulco Bay
- Canada, France, New Zealand The Adventures of the Black Stallion
- United Kingdom All Creatures Great and Small
- United States The A-Team
- Australia Bailey's Bird
- United Kingdom The Barbara Vine Mysteries
- United States Barnaby Jones
- Australia Barrier Reef
- Canada The Beachcombers
- United Kingdom Bergerac
- United Kingdom Between the Lines
- United States, Canada Beyond Reality
- United States The Big Easy
- Australia Blue Heelers
- United Kingdom Body & Soul
- Australia Bony
- Canada, France Bordertown
- Australia Breakers
- United Kingdom The Broker's Man
- United Kingdom The Buddha of Suburbia
- Australia Burned Bridge
- United States Cagney & Lacey
- Canada Catwalk
- United Kingdom Chandler & Co
- United States CHiPS
- United Kingdom Christabel
- Australia Come In Spinner
- United Kingdom Connie
- Canada, France Counterstrike
- United Kingdom Cracker
- United States Crime Story
- United Kingdom Crocodile Shoes
- Australia Cyclone Tracy
- Canada Danger Bay
- United Kingdom Danger UXB
- United Kingdom Dangerfield
- United States Dangerous Curves
- United Kingdom The Duchess of Duke Street
- United States, Canada Due South
- Australia The Dunera Boys
- United Kingdom Edge of Darkness
- United States Eleanor and Franklin
- Canada Emilie
- Canada E.N.G.
- United Kingdom Firm Friends
- United States The Flash
- Australia A Fortunate Life
- United Kingdom Fortunes of War
- Australia G.P.
- United States Gavilan
- United Kingdom The Ginger Tree
- United Kingdom Gone to the Dogs
- Mexico, United States The Guilt
- United States Hardcastle and McCormick
- United States Hawkeye
- United Kingdom, Australia The Heroes
- United States Holocaust
- United Kingdom The House of Eliott
- United Kingdom Howards' Way
- United States In the Heat of the Night
- United States Ironside
- United Kingdom The Invisible Man
- New Zealand Jackson's Wharf
- United States Jessie
- United States JFK: Reckless Youth
- United Kingdom, United States Kennedy
- United States Knight Rider
- Australia Land of Hope
- United Kingdom The Legend of King Arthur
- United Kingdom Lytton's Diary
- United Kingdom Love Hurts
- United States Manions of America
- Australia The Man from Snowy River
- New Zealand Marlin Bay
- United States Miami Sands
- United States The Mississippi
- United States The Mod Squad
- United Kingdom My Family and Other Animals
- Canada North of 60
- United States One West Waikiki
- United Kingdom The Onedin Line
- United States The Outsiders
- Australia Pacific Drive
- United Kingdom A Perfect Spy
- Australia Police Rescue
- United Kingdom The Professionals
- United States Quantum Leap
- United States Q.E.D.
- United States Rags to Riches
- United Kingdom Rescue
- United Kingdom Rides
- United States The Rockford Files
- United States Roots
- United States Roots: The Next Generations
- Canada Scoop
- Australia Seven Deadly Sins
- New Zealand Shark in the Park
- United Kingdom Shine on Harvey Moon
- Canada Side Effects
- United Kingdom Silas Marner
- United Kingdom Sloggers
- United States Star Trek: Deep Space Nine
- United States Star Trek: The Next Generation
- Canada Street Legal
- United States The Streets of San Francisco
- United States St. Elsewhere
- United States Supercarrier
- United States Supertrain
- United States Swamp Thing
- United States Swans Crossing
- Australia Sword of Honour
- United Kingdom Tender Is the Night
- United States Thunder in Paradise
- United States Tour of Duty
- United Kingdom To Play the King
- Canada Tropical Heat
- Canada T. and T.
- United States Veronica Clare
- United States Walker Texas Ranger
- United States Wiseguy
- United States The Women of Brewster Place
- United States The Wonder Years
- United Kingdom Wycliffe
- United Kingdom Wynne and Penkovsky
- United States Zorro

==== Sports ====
- United States Everyday Workout
- United States Gillette World Sport Special
- United Kingdom Trans World Sport
- United States WCW Pro

==== Music ====
- United Kingdom Later... with Jools Holland
- United States Night Flight

==== Lifestyle ====
- United States Lifestyles of the Rich and Famous
- Canada Painted House

==== Soap opera ====
- United States Another Life
- Australia Chances
- Australia E Street
- Australia Echo Point
- United Kingdom Eldorado
- Australia Home and Away
- New Zealand Homeward Bound
- United States Hotel
- United States Knots Landing
- Canada Mount Royal
- Australia Paradise Beach
- Australia Richmond Hill
- United States Santa Barbara
- Australia Starting Out
- Canada Strange Paradise
- Canada Time of Your Life

==== Variety ====
- United States Night Flight
- Ireland Secrets
- United States Showtime at the Apollo

==== Documentary ====
- United Kingdom Airport
- Canada Audubon Wildlife Theatre
- United States Born Famous
- United Kingdom Civilisation
- Australia The Extraordinary
- United Kingdom The Face of Tutankhamen
- United States Hollywood's Leading Men and Women
- Canada Inside the Vatican
- United States Mega Movie Magic
- United Kingdom Memories of 1970-1991
- United States Mysteries, Magic and Miracles
- United States Mysteries of the Bible
- United Kingdom Nautilus
- United States National Geographic Specials
- United States Nature
- United Kingdom Police Camera Action!
- United Kingdom The Power and the Glory
- Canada Profiles of Nature
- United States Return to the Sea
- United Kingdom River Journeys
- United States SeaTek
- United Kingdom The Shadow Circus: The CIA in Tibet
- United Kingdom The Spice of Life
- United Kingdom Tigers on the Tiles
- United Kingdom Walking with Dinosaurs
- United States World of Audubon

==== Food ====
- United Kingdom Delia Smith's Cookery Course
- United Kingdom Floyd on Britain and Ireland
- United Kingdom Ken Hom's Chinese Cookery

==== News ====
- United States Front Runners

==== Education ====
- Australia Beyond 2000
- Canada F.R.O.G.
- Canada Look Up
- Canada The Magic Library
- United States Newton's Apple
- Canada Polka Dot Door
- Canada Return to the Magic Library

==== Travel ====
- United Kingdom Dominika's Planet

==== Animation ====
- United Kingdom, Wales Operavox: The Animated Operas
- United States The Simpsons

==== Children's ====
- United Kingdom 50/50
- United States Adventures from the Book of Virtues
- United Kingdom The Adventures of Portland Bill
- Australia The Adventures of Skippy
- United States Adventures of Sonic the Hedgehog
- United States The Adventures of Super Mario Bros. 3
- United States, Japan The Adventures of the Galaxy Rangers
- Japan The Adventures of the Little Prince
- France, Canada The Adventures of Tintin
- Australia Adventures on Kythera
- United Kingdom, France, Canada Albert - the 5th Musketeer
- Japan, Netherlands Alfred J. Kwak
- United Kingdom The Alphabet Game
- United States Alvin and the Chipmunks
- United States, Germany, Canada Amazing Tails
- United States Animal Miracles
- United Kingdom, France The Animals of Farthing Wood
- Spain The Authentic Adventures of Professor Thompson
- France, Canada Babar
- United States Baggy Pants and the Nitwits
- Spain Basket Fever
- United States Batman: The Animated Series
- Canada BB and Jennifer
- United States Biker Mice from Mars
- United States, Canada Beetlejuice
- United Kingdom Belfry Witches
- United States, Australia The Berenstain Bears
- United Kingdom Bertha
- New Zealand Betty's Bunch
- United States Beverly Hills Teens
- Canada The Big Comfy Couch
- Canada, France, Belgium, Germany Billy the Cat
- United Kingdom The Biz
- France Bob Morane
- United Kingdom Bod
- Canada Bookmice
- United Kingdom The Borrowers
- United Kingdom The Box of Delights
- United Kingdom Breakpoint
- United Kingdom The Brollys
- Canada Brownstone Kids
- Australia Boffins
- France, United States Bucky O'Hare and the Toad Wars!
- Hungary The Bunny with the Checkered Ears
- United States C Bear and Jamal
- Australia c/o The Bartons
- Canada Camp Cariboo
- United States Captain Planet and the Planeteers
- United States, Canada Care Bears
- United Kingdom Century Falls
- United Kingdom Charlie Chalk
- New Zealand Children of Fire Mountain
- Japan Choppy and the Princess
- United Kingdom The Chronicles of Narnia
- United States Conan and the Young Warriors
- United States, France, Canada Conan the Adventurer
- United Kingdom The Country Boy
- United Kingdom Count Duckula
- United States Critter Gitters
- France Cupido
- Australia The Curiosity Show
- Canada Curse of the Viking Grave
- United Kingdom, Canada Cyberkidz
- United Kingdom Dappledown Farm
- Australia, New Zealand, France Deepwater Haven
- United States Defenders of the Earth
- France Delfy and His Friends
- United States, France Dennis the Menace
- United States, France Denver, the Last Dinosaur
- Spain Detective Bogey
- Australia The Digswell Dog Show
- United States Dink, the Little Dinosaur
- United States Dino-Riders
- United Kingdom, Netherlands Doctor Snuggles
- United States, France Dragon Flyz
- Canada Eric's World
- Australia Escape from Jupiter
- United Kingdom Eye of the Storm
- United States The Fabulous Reggae Dogs
- United Kingdom The Famous Five
- United States Fangface
- United States Fat Albert and the Cosby Kids
- Australia Fat Cat and Friends
- Wales Fireman Sam
- United Kingdom Five Children and It
- United States The Flintstones
- Canada The Forest Rangers
- New Zealand The Flying Kiwi
- United States Flying, Trying and Honking Around
- United States, United Kingdom, Canada Fraggle Rock
- Canada F.R.O.G.
- New Zealand Gather Your Dreams
- Japan G-Force
- United States G.I. Joe Extreme
- Australia, United Kingdom The Genie from Down Under
- United States Gerbert
- United States, France The Get Along Gang
- United States Ghostbusters
- Australia The Girl from Tomorrow
- Australia Glad Rags
- United Kingdom Gran
- Italy The Great Book of Nature
- United States The Great Space Coaster
- United Kingdom Gumdrop
- United Kingdom Haunting of Cassie Palmer
- Australia Haydaze
- Canada Hello Mrs. Cherrywinkle
- United Kingdom Henry's Cat
- United States Here Comes the Grump
- Australia Hills End
- Australia Hot Science
- United States The Houndcats
- Canada Huckleberry Finn and His Friends
- United States Hulk Hogan's Rock 'n' Wrestling
- United States, United Kingdom, Scotland Hurricanes
- United States Incredible Dennis the Menace
- United States, Japan Inhumanoids
- Canada Inquiring Minds
- France, United States, Canada Inspector Gadget
- United Kingdom Jack in the Box
- United States, United Kingdom Jackson 5ive
- United States James Bond Jr.
- United States Jay Jay the Jet Plane
- United States Jim Henson's Animal Show
- United States Jem
- Italy Jesus: A Kingdom Without Frontiers
- Australia Johnson and Friends
- Japan Jungle Book Shōnen Mowgli
- Australia Kaboodle
- France, Canada, South Korea Kassai and Luk
- United Kingdom Kevin's Cousins
- Australia Kids Down Under
- United States Kids Incorporated
- United States Kids TV
- United States The Kid-a-Littles
- Japan Kimba the White Lion
- United States Laurel and Hardy
- United States The Legend of Prince Valiant
- France, Canada The Legend of White Fang
- Croatia, Canada The Little Flying Bears
- Canada, United States Little Rosey
- United Kingdom Little Sir Nicholas
- Canada The Littlest Hobo
- Canada Look Up
- Canada The Magic Library
- France Marsupilami
- Canada Mathica's Mathshop
- Canada The MAXimum Dimension
- Japan Medabots
- Australia The Miraculous Mellops
- Australia, New Zealand Mirror, Mirror
- Australia More Winners
- United States Mother Nature: Tales of Discovery
- United States Muppet Babies
- Canada Music Box
- Canada, United States My Pet Monster
- United States The New Adventures of Flash Gordon
- United States, Japan The New Adventures of Speed Racer
- United Kingdom, Canada, United States Noddy in Toyland
- United Kingdom Oasis
- Canada The Odyssey
- United States Old MacDonald's Sing-A-Long Farm
- Canada Panda Bear Daycare
- United Kingdom Panic Station
- United States Pee-wee's Playhouse
- United Kingdom Penny Crayon
- United States Pigasso's Place
- United Kingdom Pigeon Street
- United Kingdom Pirates
- Italy Pocahontas
- Canada Polka Dot Door
- Yugoslavia, Croatia Professor Balthazar
- Australia Pugwall
- Australia Pugwall's Summer
- United States The Puppy's New Adventures
- United States The Puzzle Place
- Canada Ramona
- United States Rambo: The Force of Freedom
- United States The Real Ghostbusters
- United Kingdom The Really Wild Show
- United States, Canada ReBoot
- France Redbeard
- Germany Renada
- United Kingdom The Return of the Psammead
- Canada Return to the Magic Library
- United States Rimba's Island
- Japan Robotech
- United Kingdom Rosie and Jim
- Australia Round the Twist
- Canada Ruffus the Dog
- United Kingdom, Canada, France Rupert
- Japan, United States Saber Rider and the Star Sheriffs
- Canada Scoop and Doozie
- Canada, France Sea Dogs
- United Kingdom The Secret Garden
- United States Sesame Street
- France, Canada Sharky & George
- New Zealand The Shelly T. Turtle Show
- Italy Simba the Lion King
- United Kingdom Simon and the Witch
- Australia Simon Townsend's Wonder World
- Austria, Germany Simsala Grimm
- United States Skeleton Warriors
- United States, France Sky Dancers
- United States, Japan Skysurfer Strike Force
- France Small Stories
- Canada, France The Smoggies
- United States, Belgium The Smurfs
- United States, Belgium Snorks
- United Kingdom Sooty & Co.
- France Spartakus & the Sun Beneath the Sea
- Australia, Poland Spellbinder
- United States Spiral Zone
- United Kingdom Spooks of Bottle Bay
- United States Sport Billy
- New Zealand Star Runner
- United States, Canada Star Wars: Droids
- United States, Canada Star Wars: Ewoks
- United States, United Kingdom, France Stone Protectors
- Russia, United States Stories From My Childhood
- Japan The Story of Cinderella
- United Kingdom Streetwise
- United States Superhuman Samurai Syber-Squad
- United States The Super Mario Bros. Super Show!
- Italy, United States Super Mario World
- Canada T. and T.
- United Kingdom Tales from Bledlow Ridge
- United Kingdom, Canada Tales of the Riverbank
- United States Tattooed Teenage Alien Fighters from Beverly Hills
- United States Teenage Mutant Ninja Turtles
- United Kingdom Terrahawks
- Canada Today’s Special
- Japan, United States The Transformers
- Spain The Triplets
- South Korea, United States Twinkle, the Dream Being
- United States The Twisted Tales of Felix the Cat
- United Kingdom Uncle Jack
- France, Japan Ulysses 31
- Australia Wonder World!
- United States Vid Kids
- United States Visionaries: Knights of the Magical Light
- Canada Waterville Gang
- United Kingdom Wavelength
- United Kingdom Who Sir? Me Sir?
- United States Wide World of Kids
- United States, South Korea Widget the World Watcher
- France, United Kingdom The Wild Bunch
- United Kingdom The Wild House
- United Kingdom Wimpole Village
- Australia Winners
- United Kingdom, New Zealand Worzel Gummidge Down Under
- Canada, France Zoe and Charlie

==== Video games ====
- United Kingdom Cybernet
- United Kingdom Movies, Games and Videos

==== Talk shows ====
- United States The 700 Club
- United States Jimmy Swaggart
- United States Kenneth Copeland
- United States The Oprah Winfrey Show
- United States The Phil Donahue Show
- United States Sally Jesse Raphael

==== Sci-fi ====
- United States Beyond Reality
- Canada RoboCop: The Series
- United States Starman
- United States VR.5

==== TV specials ====
- United States The Ann Jillian Story
- United States The Benny Goodman Special
- United States Frosty's Return
- United States Inspector Gadget Saves Christmas
- United States Tales of Washington Irving
- Canada The Teddy Bears' Christmas

==== Reality ====
- United States Lifestyles of the Rich and Famous
- United States That's Incredible!

==== Game shows ====
- United Kingdom The Alphabet Game
- United Kingdom The Crystal Maze
- United States Infatuation

==== Telefilms ====
- Australia Cassidy

==== TV movies ====
- United States And Your Name Is Jonah
- United States Broadway Bound
- United States Callie and Son
- Austria, United States, Germany Catherine the Great
- United Kingdom, Australia Children of the Dragon
- United States Cooperstown
- United States Criminal Justice
- United States Death at Love House
- France, United States The Fatal Image
- United States The Heart of Justice
- United States Jailbirds
- United States The Jesse Owens Story
- United States LBJ: The Early Years
- United Kingdom, United States Letting Go
- United States Memorial Day
- United States Mercy Mission: The Rescue of Flight 771
- United States Mrs. 'Arris Goes to Paris
- United States Murder Ordained
- United States, United Kingdom Indiscreet
- United States Return of the Rebels
- United States The Right of the People
- United States Rockabye
- United Kingdom Silas Marner
- New Zealand, Canada The Sound and the Silence
- United States Spider-Man
- United States The Trial of Harvey Lee Oswald
- United Kingdom Under the Sun
- United States The Users
- United States The Witching of Ben Wagner
