= Interster =

- The cover of the first volume of Interster released in Afrikaans by the SABC on 10 March 2009 featuring the main characters from the series.
- Created by: Lindsay du Plessis
- Developed by: Dirk De Villiers
- Written by: Dr Johann Beukes
- Directed by: Gavin Keyser
- Composers: Tully Macallaugh; Lloyd Ross
- Country of origin: South Africa
- Original language: Afrikaans
- No. of seasons: 2
- No. of episodes: 37

Production
- Running time: 25 minutes
- Production company: C-Films

Original release
- Network: TV1
- Release: 20 July 1982 – 26 April 1986

Interster (Afrikaans, Inter-star) (author Dr Johann Beukes 1949–2007) is a two-season science-fiction puppet television series made for children and shown in South Africa from the early 1980s. At the time of its production the show was variously compared to the series Thunderbirds, which was previously broadcast in South Africa in Afrikaans under the title Redding Internasionaal (International Rescue).

The main plot involved an undercover planetary defense agency operating from Cape Town under the guise of an interstellar shipping company. The show mirrored the real world political issues of international isolation facing Apartheid South Africa with the Earth being depicted as a galactic pariah of the "Interplanetary League" due to its cold war with the planet "Krokon". The villain in the series was depicted by Prince Karnati or his evil henchmen.

The spaceships used in the show were called Impalas after the South African Air Force aircraft, the locally assembled Italian Aermacchi MB-326. There was a pragmatic reason for calling the aircraft Impalas - the basis of the models were 1/48 scale plastic model kits of the AM326, so that they would be recognizable to South African youth.

== Plot ==
The main characters were based in the city of Cape Town while enemies were aliens from a distant space system. The entire series was produced in Afrikaans.

Plot wise, Interster was far removed from any of the Anderson stories. There was no unified government as seen in either Captain Scarlet and the Mysterons or Fireball XL5 - South Africa alone possessed interstellar flight, and alone was in contact with the first aliens to visit earth, who supposedly hailed from Alpha Centauri, the star closest to Earth.

In the stories, the protagonists were concerned only with the defense of South Africa - the rest of the world was more of an abstraction. Interaction with the Centauri's was the primary interaction with South Africa. A number of fascinating concepts were explored - relative to humans, the Centauris are only the size of dolls, and their ships and technology are scaled to match. Perhaps the greatest triumph of the puppeteers are not just the human puppets, but the Centauris - for they were as intricate, but barely 10 cm high as compared with the 32 cm human puppets for simultaneous shots.

The plot contained some content of interest to South African adults who could see the political connotations to some of the themes like political isolation. One character (a villain) bore a remarkable resemblance to the then South African President PW Botha.

== Production ==
The same team that produced Interster had started in the late 1970s with Liewe Heksie, with the same sophisticated puppetry making its first appearance in the adventures of a well-meaning but absent-minded little witch. The internal-wiring puppeteers made their final work a set of musical crickets that played music for a children's program featuring two more puppets, Sarel Seemonster, a friendly sea monster which could blow steam from his nostrils, and Karel Kraai, a crow which was fully functional to the point of being able to remove his hat, for the children's TV program Wielie Walie, named for the first line of a traditional Afrikaans children's verse version of 'Ring a Ring a Rosie'.

Interster was the brain-child of filmmaker Lindsay du Plessis. Du Plessis also worked on the puppet series Tales of Africa before that. Interster was produced almost 10 years after the last Gerry Anderson television show to use supermarionation techniques (The Secret Service, 1969) and almost 15 years after Thunderbirds, and as a result was technically superior:

- Puppets were internally wired, and movable in a large range of motion.
- Apple II programmed and controlled servos provided better motion.
- Pyrotechnics were also more impressive, requiring a special permit from the production crew.
- Many of them models 'Fly' using a sophisticated process involving ultra-thin lines and servo motor control, permitting a very convincing anti-gravity/flight special effect. With the film and TV camera process in use at the time of production, the thin lines are of course optically invisible on all shots of spacecraft.

The cockpits of the Impalas are noteworthy for including a fairly sophisticated wiring loom, including flashing lights and a complete fully functional TV screen which is able to display computer text. In addition, the pilots sit in a semi-reclining position, echoing the seating of the F-16 jet fighter.

The future Cape Town is a detailed model, and can be seen in considerable detail during the opening credits of the program in a downward looking flyby.

The longer story arc and individual plots were also unusually sophisticated for a children's show.

== See also ==
- Supermarionation, the animation technique using puppets
- Thunderbirds (TV series), similar series
- X-Bomber, similar non-Anderson puppet series made around the same time in Japan.
- List of South African animated television series
