= Riaan Cruywagen =

South African television news reader and voice artist

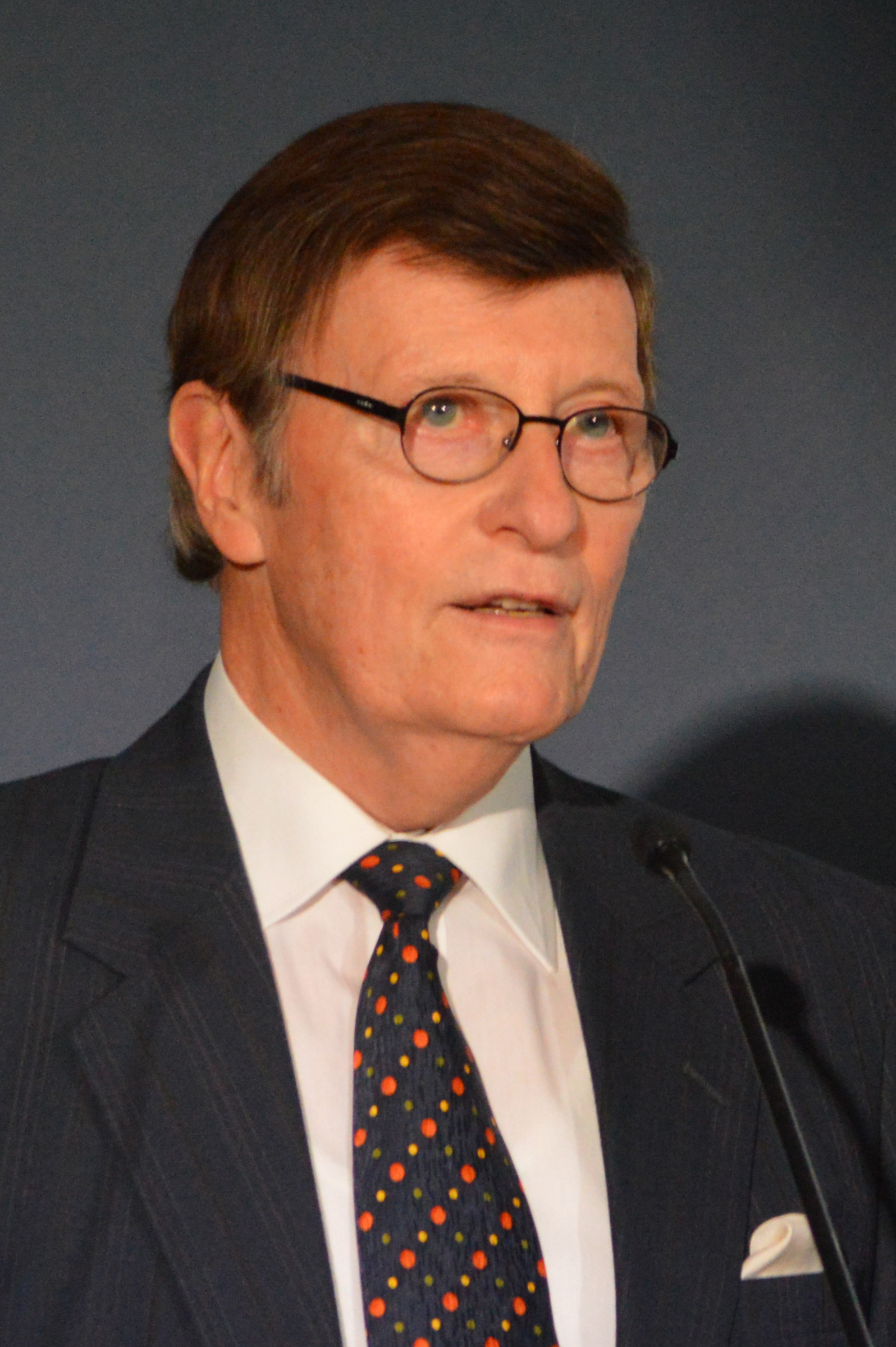
- Born: 5 October 1945 (age 81)
- Education: University of Stellenbosch
- Known for: TV news presenter

Riaan Cruywagen (born 5 October 1945) is a South African television news reader and voice artist who has been associated with the South African Broadcasting Corporation since its first television broadcasts in 1975. Cruywagen continued to present the Afrikaans news on the SABC network every weeknight until his final broadcast on SABC 2 on 26 November 2012 at 7pm CAT. He has made approximately 7000 news broadcasts.

== Career ==
He began his career as a journalist in 1965 when he started working part-time at the SABC in Cape Town, while studying at the University of Stellenbosch. He presented his first news bulletin on 26 November 1975 at 8:00 pm – the first story he read on that night was the sentencing of Breyten Breytenbach to nine years in jail.

In June 2003, following an outcry over reports that Cruywagen's contract with the SABC would not be renewed, an agreement between the SABC and UASA (United Association of South Africa) was reached. His contract was renewed and it was announced that he would continue with his duties for a period of time. Cruywagen presented his final news bulletin on SABC 2 on 26 November 2012 at 7 pm.

The name Riaan Cruywagen has become synonymous with Afrikaans television news through his lengthy career. In the mid-2000s, following the contract renewal issue, Cruywagen was once more the focus of popular culture in South Africa for a time, when a number of e-mail and internet jokes originally referring to Chuck Norris and David Hasselhoff were modified by using his name in their place. South African-themed jokes in a similar vein were also circulated, mostly related to his perennially youthful appearance and intellectual prowess.

Cruywagen was also the voice artist for the character Haas Das on the popular Afrikaans children's news programme Haas Das se Nuuskas in 1976. He also voiced the character when it was revived in a movie Haas Das hou konsert (Hare Tie Holds A Concert) in 2007. He originally landed the job when he told the show's creator Louise Smit a joke. She grabbed him and screamed: "I've got my rabbit!". He also voiced numerous characters in another popular children's programme, "Liewe Heksie".

He appeared in an ad-campaign for ATKV/Pendoring, as a waiter in a restaurant with a board on the wall saying: "Moenie die taal afskeep nie! (Don't neglect the language!)" – referring to Afrikaans. Cruywagen has appeared in a number of films, playing himself as a newsreader, including an appearance reading the news in Zulu in Leon Schuster's Sweet 'n Short. He was also seen in Stander as a nostalgic reminder of his long career as newsreader.

Following his retirement from SABC presented the morning show Dagbreek on kykNET until retiring from that show in 2019. As of 2025 he continues to present Afrikaans language programming from a studio in Mossel Bay.

== See also ==
- Haas Das se Nuuskas
- Liewe Heksie
