= Haas Das se Nuuskas =

Television show in South Africa

Haas Das se Nuuskas (literally Haas Das's News Box, or Newscast) is a weekly short television show in South Africa about a rabbit and a mouse running a news broadcast in Diere Land (Animal Land). Created by Louise Smit in 1976, at the time of television's introduction in South Africa, it was the first children's television programme in that country. The "news" typically revolved around all the animals' complaints, achievements and scandals. The voice of Haas Das was performed by a real South African news anchorman, Riaan Cruywagen.

== Characters ==
=== Puppets ===
- Haas Das (news reader/anchorman) ("Haas Das" is Afrikaans for "Hare Tie". The character is a hare wearing a tie.)
- Piet Muis (assistant and weather forecaster) ("Peter Mouse" -"Muis" is Afrikaans for "mouse".)

=== Animated/Drawn characters ===
- Koning Leeu (King Lion)
- Skriba Sekretarisvoel (Skriba ("Scribe") Secretarybird)
- Skillie Skilpad (Skillie Tortoise)
- Grootoom Flapoor Olifant (Great-uncle Flap-ear Elephant)
- Moeder Raaf (Mother Raven)
- Oupa Dassie (Grandpa Dassie)
- Krokkie Krokodil (Krokkie Crocodile)
- Bettina Bobbejaan (Bettina Baboon)
- Bakkies Bobbejaan (Bakkies Baboon)
- Bulletjie Wildebees (Bulletjie ("Little Bull") Wildebeest)
- Sersant-Inspekteur Tienie Ratel (Sergeant-Inspector Tienie Badger)
- Bella Bokooi (Bella Goat)
- Droster Renoster (Droster Rhinoceros)
- Floris Volstruis (Floris Ostrich)
- Spiekeries Springbok (Spiekeries Springbuck)
- Dr. Karoolus Krap (Dr.Karoolus Crab)
- Martin Miskruier( Martin the Dung-Beetle)
- Vlossie Mossie (Vlossie Sparrow)
- Hasie Kwassie (Bunny Tuft)

== Creative team ==
- Creator: Louise Smit
- Writer: Louise Smit
- Graphic Artist and Animator: Butch Stoltz
- Channel: SAUK/SABC
- Voice Talents:- Riaan Cruywagen, Monica Breed
- Original Puppet Builder: Alida von Maltitz/van Deventer
- Theme Song: Gert Van Tonder

== Revival ==
The show was revived as a direct-to-DVD movie in 2007 and released by Sony BMG. Just like Wielie Walie, it was the first of Louise Smit's original creations to be redone. Haas Das hou konsert (Haas Das holds a concert), a movie based on the new book by Smit, was all about Koning Leeu (King Lion) having a terrible headache from all the animals' complaints, and Haas Das organising a concert in his honour to make him feel better. All of the original animated characters were recreated as puppets for this production, and even a few new characters were added, like Boeboe Bobbejaan (Boeboe Baboon) and Stinkie Muishond (Stinky Skunk). The new puppet versions of Haas Das and Piet Muis were designed and made by Althea Oelofse while some of the other puppets were supplied by Antoinette Snyman, Morgwyn Fourie and Elize Jordan. Riaan Cruywagen returned as voice talent. Gert Van Tonder from Wielie Walie makes a guest appearance.

=== New voice cast ===
Haas Das: Riaan Cruywagen

Piet Muis: Jan Wolmarans (speaking), Annaretha Naude (singing)

Koning Leeu: Rouel Beukes

Grootoom Flapoor Olifant: Nic De Jager

Bettina Bobbejaan: Annaretha Naude

BoeBoe Bobbejaan: Dulinda Pieters

Bakkies Bobbejaan: Dulinda Pieters

Kleinstinkie Muishond: Verna Vels

Moeder Raaf: Nic De Jager (speaking), Riana van Vollenhoven (singing)

== Other appearances ==
Haas Das and Piet Muis (the show's original puppets) appeared in the ads for the KKNK (Klein Karoo Nationale Kunstefees/Klein Karoo National Arts Festival) in 2002, where he announced the festival. The ads included TV ads and posters. On the TV ads he was a news reader at DNN (Diere Nuus Netwerk/Animal News Network), but on the posters he was seen as a DJ sitting at a spinning table, instead of his well-known news desk.

After that he also performed shows at arts festivals, with puppets made by Hansie Visagie, in his own unique style.

Haas Das also recently appeared in an ad-campaign for ATKV/Pendoring to promote Afrikaans. He is pictured as a fat bum in a living room, on a couch with cans all around him (with the name "Das bier/Das beer" on the cans), but here he is not a puppet, he is a full body costume/puppet resembling the original puppet. The campaign shows what happens to the characters when if the language is unused or extinct. This is the usual message of the ATKV (Afrikaanse Taal en Kultuur Vereeniging/Afrikaans Language and Culture Organisation).

== Books ==
Louise Smit has written two Haas Das books: Haas Das se Nuuskas (2006), illustrated by Fred Mouton, and Haas Das raak weg (2008), illustrated by Tanja Joubert. Both are published by Human & Rousseau.

== DVDs ==
The original Haas Das Nuuskas-series and Haas Das hou konsert-movie are available in South Africa on DVD.

== See also ==
- Liewe Heksie
- Television in South Africa
- List of South African television series
