= Bophuthatswana Broadcasting Corporation =

- Type: Terrestrial television and radio network
- Country: South Africa
- Availability: Bophuthatswana
- Founded: 1983; 43 years ago
- Headquarters: Mmabatho, South Africa
- Broadcast area: Bophuthatswana
- Launch date: 1976 (radio); 1983 (television)
- Television: Bop TV; Mmabatho Television; Edutel
- Radio: Radio Bop; Radio Mmabatho; Radio Sunshine

The Bophuthatswana Broadcasting Corporation (BopBC or BBC) was the public broadcaster of the former apartheid-era bantustan of Bophuthatswana in South Africa. It provided three radio stations (the general service Radio Bop, the public station Radio Mmabatho and the religious station Radio Sunshine), two television channels (Bop TV and Mmabatho Television) and an educational service (Edutel).

After apartheid ended and Bophuthatswana was dissolved, BopBC was dissolved between 1996 and 1998. One of its core assets, Bop TV, was absorbed into the SABC and later shut down.

== History ==
The Bophuthatswana Broadcasting Corporation was created by its government in 1983, operating the newly launched Bop TV station and Radio Bop in the Bop and Soweto areas, later joined by the Mmabatho stations for the Molopo region. It was one of the four broadcasting corporations to be established in the TBVC homelands. Its main channel Bop TV delivered its services by arrangement with the SABC, broadcasting over eleven transmitters.

BBC/BopBC was also seen as a propaganda tool for the Bophuthatswana government under Lucas Mangope. When it was incorporated into South Africa in 1994, the company continued operating, although it feared a takeover from the SABC, which, in that period, was aligned to the centrist ANC. On 8 March 1994, all 350 staff members took over the control of Bop TV and took the corporation's chariman Eddie Mangope hostage. By February 1996, its staff feared integration into the SABC, having only two months left before its funding was cut off. One possible solution was a total rebrand of the corporation, with new logos for its assets.

After its absorption into the SABC, the two parties were involved in a R429 million legal dispute in 2007 with Sentech, regarding the use of some of its infrastructure.
