= Steve Adams (actor) =

Australian actor

- Occupation: Actor
- Years active: 1985-2019

Steve Adams is an Australian actor. For his performance in Something in the Air he was nominated for the 2001 Australian Film Institute Award for Best Performance by an Actor in a Guest Role in a Television Drama Series.

Roles he has played include the TV series Something in the Air as Father Brian, Spanish teacher Pablo in the film Strange Fits of Passion and stage roles of Charles Manson in The Charles Manson Variety Hour and Valentin in Kiss of the Spider Woman.
