= Strange Fits of Passion =

- Directed by: Elise McCredie
- Written by: Elise McCredie
- Produced by: Lucy Maclaren
- Starring: Michela Noonan; Mitchell Butel; Samuel Johnson
- Cinematography: Jaems Grant
- Edited by: Chris Branagan; Ken Sallows
- Music by: Cezary Skubiszewski
- Release date: 1999
- Country: Australia
- Language: English
- Box office: A$22,590 (Australia)

Strange Fits of Passion is a 1999 Australian film directed by Elise McCredie and starring Michela Noonan. It is about a young woman determined to lose her virginity.

== Cast ==
- Michela Noonan as She
- Mitchell Butel as Jimmy
- Samuel Johnson as Josh
- Steve Adams as Pablo
- Anni Finsterer as Judy
- Bojana Novakovic as Jaya
- Rob Carlton as Blackson
- Jack Finsterer as Francis
- Nathan Page as Simon
- Tommy Dysart as Taxi Driver
- Maude Davey as Woman in Gay Bookshop
