= Mitchell Butel =

Australian actor and singer

- Born: Mitchell Patrick Butel; 10 February 1970 (age 56)
- Education: University of NSW
- Occupations: Actor, singer, writer, director
- Awards: Helpmann Award (4); Green Room Award (2); Sydney Theatre Award (4)

Mitchell Patrick Butel (born 10 February 1970) is an Australian actor, singer, director and writer. He is best known for his work in theatre, including musical and opera productions. He was the artistic director of the State Theatre Company of South Australia from 2019 to 2024 and will take up the position of artistic director of the Sydney Theatre Company in November 2024.

== Early life and education ==
Mitchell Patrick Butel was born on 10 February 1970 and educated at Marcellin College Randwick. He became interested in theatre as a child after seeing the musical Song and Dance and later Little Shop of Horrors.

He attended the University of New South Wales and studied for a degree in arts/law, majoring in Theatre Studies and working as a paralegal in a law firm between terms.

== Theatre ==
=== Acting ===
Butel was part of the original cast of the Australian production of Avenue Q in 2009, playing the roles of two puppet characters, Princeton and Rod. He has since then worked for many theatre companies.

In 2012 he played Friar Laurance in Kip Williams' production of Romeo and Juliet with the Sydney Theatre Company.

He has also worked in a number of musical theatre productions, and as of 2018 was the voice of the Play School theme song.

In 2017, Butel played two characters, Mr Burns and Gibson, in Mr. Burns, a post-electric play, a co-production between Sydney's Belvoir St Theatre and the State Theatre Company South Australia. His performance was met with good reviews, and won a Helpmann Award. The play was performed at Space Theatre in the Adelaide Festival Centre in April–May 2017 and at the Belvoir in May–June 2017.

=== Writer and director ===
Butel's writing credits include Excellent Adventure and Killing Time and he wrote additional material for Meow Meow's Little Match Girl, Belvoir St Theatre's production of The Government Inspector and Opera Australia's production of The Mikado.

His directing credits include Violet at the Hayes Theatre which was awarded Best Production of an Independent Musical at the 2015 Sydney Theatre Awards and for which he was awarded Best Director of a Musical. Violet had its Melbourne season at Chapel Off Chapel.

He directed the winning play of the 2016 Lysicrates Prize for New Australian Playwriting, Mary Rachel Brown's Approximate Balance. In 2016, Butel directed Spring Awakening for Australian Theatre for Young People which won Best Production for Young People at the Sydney Theatre Awards and Porgy and Bess at the Sydney Opera House for the Sydney Symphony Orchestra.

In 2018 Butel co-directed An Act of God for the Darlinghurst Theatre Company and directed the Australian premiere of Jordan Harrison's play, Marjorie Prime as part of the Ensemble Theatre's 60th Anniversary Season. Also in 2018, directed Funny Girl and The Bernstein Songbook for the Sydney Symphony Orchestra.

In September 2018, he directed a production of the operetta Candide, staged at the Sydney Opera House with the Sydney Philharmonia Choirs, Sydney Youth Orchestra, and stars from Opera Australia, and also played the part of Dr Pangloss as well as the narrator. Alexander Lewis played Candide, Annie Aitken was Cunegonde, and veteran actress Caroline O'Connor took the part of The Old Lady.

In 2019, he directed Mary Rachel Brown's Dead Cat Bounce for Griffin Theatre and Tony Kushner and Jeanine Tesori's Caroline, Or Change for the Hayes Theatre.

=== State Theatre Company of South Australia ===
In March 2019 Butel was appointed artistic director of State Theatre Company South Australia (STCSA), taking over from Geordie Brookman. He oversaw a project called Decameron 2.0, a collaboration between STCSA and ActNow Theatre consisting of a series of 10 stories written, directed and acted by a diverse group of local talent. They were released as videos online from June 2020, when theatres were closed during the COVID-19 pandemic. It was one of largest pieces of online theatre in the world.

In 2021, he directed Gli amori d'Apollo e di Dafne for Pinchgut Opera.

In February–March 2022, he directed Dennis Kelly's one-woman play, Girls & Boys, staged by STCSA at the Odeon Theatre, Norwood in Adelaide as part of the Adelaide Festival, and stars Justine Clarke.

In September–October 2022, Butel acted in The Normal Heart, a play set in the HIV/AIDS crisis of the 1980s in New York City, in an STCSA production directed by Dean Bryant.

In May 2024, he again directed and performed Candide in a co-production by the STCSA and State Opera South Australia, performed for three nights in Her Majesty's Theatre, Adelaide, with the three main actors reprising their roles.

=== Sydney Theatre Company ===
In 2024, Butel was appointed as the artistic director of the Sydney Theatre Company, replacing Kip Williams. He took up the position in November 2024.

== Film ==
Butel has acted in a number of films, including Dark City (1998); Strange Fits of Passion (1999); Two Hands (1999); The Bank (2001); Gettin' Square (2003); Dance Academy: The Movie (2017); and A Sunburnt Christmas (2020), as well as many TV series, including Bordertown (1999); Janet King, Deep Water (2016); and Stateless (2020).

== Opera ==
In May 2011, Butel made his Opera Australia debut in the Gilbert and Sullivan production The Mikado where he played the comedic role of Ko-Ko. In February 2013, he took part in another Opera Australia production, Orpheus in the Underworld, where he played the role of John Styx. Later in 2013, Butel performed the part of Luther Billis in Bartlett Sher's production of South Pacific for Opera Australia.

== Music ==
Killing Time is a live album Butel recorded during the Adelaide Cabaret Festival in 2010, and consists of songs with a time-related theme, as well as poetry and anecdotes. The album features a mixture of genres including jazz and cabaret. The album was released in March 2012 and was mixed and mastered by Tony King.

He can also be heard on the original cast recordings of The Republic of Myopia, Meow Meow's Little Match Girl and Opera Australia's The Mikado.

== Other roles and interests ==
Butel was a member of Actors Equity from 1988, and was deputy president of Actors Equity and vice president of superseding body the Media, Entertainment and Arts Alliance from 2009 to 2013.

He was a member of the National Performers Committee from 2007 to 2018, and on the board of Belvoir Theatre from 2012 to 2019.

As of 2022 Butel is a trustee of the Adelaide Festival Centre Trust, a member of the advisory councils of the Sydney Philharmonia Choir and Adelaide Symphony Orchestra, a peer of the Australia Council, and a fellow at the Australian Institute of Music.

== Awards ==
As of October 2022 Butel has been awarded four Helpmann Awards (one for Mr. Burns, a post-electric play); two Green Room Awards and four Sydney Theatre Awards. He was also awarded Best Actor in Play in the 2017 Broadway World Sydney Awards for Mr. Burns, a post-electric play.

He received Helpmann nominations for Little Me (2008), Summer Rain (2006) and The Republic of Myopia (2004).

He was nominated for two Australian Film Institute (AFI) Awards for Best Supporting Actor in a Feature Film for Gettin' Square (2003) and Strange Fits of Passion (1999).
