= Michela Noonan =

Australian actress

- Born: 30 January 1975 (age 51); London, England
- Occupation: Actress
- Years active: 1990–present
- Notable work: Strange Fits of Passion; The Miraculous Mellops; Spellbinder

Michela Noonan is an Italian-Australian actress who was born in England. In 1999 Noonan was nominated for an AACTA Award for Best Actress in a Leading Role for her performance in the film Strange Fits of Passion.

Noonan works in Australia and Italy. She had main roles in the Australian TV series The Miraculous Mellops and Spellbinder and played the lead in the film Strange Fits of Passion. She has appeared on film and TV in Italian productions such as Apnea, Quore and Il Destino a Quattro Zampe

== Early life ==
Noonan was born in London to an Italian father and an Australian mother. When she was 4 her parents separated and she moved with her mother to Sydney. She got her first break at age 15 in the Australian Young People's Theatre production of Romeo and Juliet.

== Filmography ==
=== Film ===
Year	Title	Role	Type
1997	Square One	Vicky	Film
1998	The Sugar Factory	Angela	Feature film
1999	Mumbo Jumbo		TV movie
1999	Strange Fits of Passion	She	Feature film
2002	Il Destino Quattro Zampe		TV movie
2002	Quore	Paola	Feature film
2002	Pier Paolo Pasolini e la ragione di un sogno	Self	Documentary film
2005	Apnea	Chiara	Feature film

=== Television ===
Year	Title	Role	Type		
1990	Home and Away	Girl #2	TV series, 1 episode		
1991	G.P.	Simone Meyer	TV series, 1 episode		
1991-92	The Miraculous Mellops	Harmony Dump	TV series, 21 episodes		
1993	A Country Practice	Donna Martin	TV series, 2 episodes		
1995-96	Spellbinder	Katrina Muggleton	TV series, 26 episodes		
1996	Ocean Girl		TV series, 1 episode		
1997	Dwa swiaty	1997	Roar	Edain	TV series, 1 episode
1998	All Saints	Julie Allen	TV series, 1 episode		
1998	Wildside	Juliette Crawley	TV series, 1 episode		
1998-2000	Water Rats	Catarina Luvece / Rebecca	TV series, 3 episodes		
2000	Farscape	Vyna	TV series, 1 episode		
2003	White Collar Blue	Dana	TV series, 1 episode		
2006	The Chaser's War on Everything	Guest	TV series, 1 episode		
2014	The Code	Annie Joyce	TV series, 1 episode		
2014	Devil's Playground	Nun	TV series, 1 episode		
