= Waterville Gang =

Canadian children's television series

The Waterville Gang is a Canadian children's television series, which aired on CTV Television Network from 1972 to 1974. Using puppetry, the series centred on a group of marine animals living at or under the sea, including Dodger Dolphin, Angel Fish, Sharky Shark, Eloise "Frenchie" the Seahorse, Sergeant Perch, Pearl Van Oyster, Tucker Turtle and Ace Seagull.

The show's voice cast included Billy Van, Len Carlson, Franz Russell, Julie Amato, Sid Brown and Donna Miller. As of 1993, Amato was still owed money for her work on the show, due to ACTRA's inability to locate her in order to send her royalty cheques.

Created by children's entertainer Barry Rosenberg and produced by CFTO-TV, the network's affiliate in Toronto, the show aired for two seasons on Saturday mornings. Following the end of production in 1974, it was sometimes seen in repeats on both CTV and YTV until 1995, as well as airing on Bop TV in South Africa and syndication in the United States.

In 1980, puppets from the series were included in an exhibition on the history of puppetry at the Ontario Puppetry Association Centre.
