= Wielie Walie =

- Created by: Louise Smit
- Written by: Louise Smit
- Country of origin: South Africa
- Original language: Afrikaans

Production
- Running time: 18 minutes
- Production company: Louise Smit Productions

Original release
- Network: SABC
- Release: 6 January 1976

Related
- Haas Das se Nuuskas; Liewe Heksie

Wielie Walie (Pronounced Vee-lee Vaa-lee) is an Afrikaans children's variety programme featuring puppets, which was broadcast from the launch of television in South Africa in 1976. With Karel and Sarel, two best friends but always fighting. Bennie always ready to read a story, and the duck and the socks chatting. Bennie was called by the bee, blowing his trumpet and the flowers, singing for him to come up from his underground library. All of these characters lived in a playroom and a park, with Oom Gert and Tannie Magda. The name "Wielie Walie" also comes from a well known South African children's song, which ended up being the theme song for the show.

== Characters ==
Louise Smit is the creator and owner of Wielie Walie. The puppets were built by the SABC Modelmaking Department- headed up by Rod Campbell.

- Sarel Seemonster (Sarel Seamonster) - original characters drawn by Johan Roos in Comic strips prior to 1975; puppet made by Rod Campbell
- Karel Kraai (Karel Crow) - original characters drawn by Johan Roos (copyright holder); puppet made by Rod Campbell
- Bennie Boekwurm (Bennie Bookworm) -character copyright belongs to Louise Smit and puppet privately made by Rod Campbell
- Bytjie (Little Bee) - designed and made by Rod Campbell
- Blommetjies (Flowers) - designed and made by Rod Campbell
- Die Kouse (The Socks)
- Meend die Eend (Meend the Duck)
- Petrus Padda (Peter the Frog)

== Presenters ==
- Magda van Biljon
- Gert van Tonder

== Original voice cast ==
- Bennie Boekwurm: Verna Vels and Dulinda Pieters from EnterActive Productions are the Bennie Boekwurm voice
- Sarel Seemonster: Francois Stemmet
- Karel Kraai: Lochner De Kock
- Blommetjies: Magda Van Biljon

== Revival ==
=== DVD ===
A remake was done in 2008, and released in 2009 on DVD, with only 2 (pilot) episodes, almost in the form of a long movie. Although there were no more presenters, a brand new character "Wagga Wagga Kwagga"-(a full body character costume), was created by the writer Louise Smit and was introduced.

Puppets: The original rod controlled and hand puppets for Wielie Walie were made by Rod Campbell. The new hand puppets were created by Toby Van Eck from Toby's Puppet and Prop shop, and the "Wagga Wagga Kwagga"-costume by Louis Niemand from LifeSize Designs. The show also had an entirely new voice cast.

New voice talents:

- Bennie Boekwurm: Dulinda Pieters
- Karel Kraai: voice artists from EnterActive Productions
- Sarel Seemonster voice artists from EnterActive Productions
- Meend Die Eend voice artists from EnterActive Productions
- Wagga Wagga Kwagga voice artists from EnterActive Productions
- Blommetjies: Dulinda Pieters
- Die Kouse: Dulinda Pieters

=== Book ===
A book : Wielie Wielie Walie appeared in 2010. With illustrations by Sean Verster. Sarel Seemonster, Karel Kraai and Die Kouse are all living happily in the Wielie Walie Park, near the Walie Mountains. Bennie Boekwurm, Bytjie and Blommetjies also live there, and Bennie is, as always, reading stories to his friends - he is a clever worm and has many storybooks in his Book tunnel. One fine day, a strange character appears in the Wielie Walie Park - his name is Wagga Wagga Kwag. Sarel and his friends immediately like him and they agree that he should stay and become their new friend.

=== Other ===
Wielie Walie's animated opening logo was designed and animated by Butch Stoltz, who was head of SABC TV's Animation Department.

The character of Bennie Boekwurm is copyrighted to Butch Stoltz and has also appeared in an ad-campaign for ATKV/Pendoring to promote Afrikaans. Bennie is pictured as a small worm on a hook in the ocean, with a phrase "Moenie die taal afskeep nie! / Don't disrespect the language!", this is to show what happens to the characters when the language is mistreated.

In 1980, an orchestral group of puppets featuring the conductor Maestro Mole appeared in several episodes of Wielie Walie. The puppets were made by Rod Campbell and Mike Olivier was credited with puppet fabrication and set design for the programme. Maestro Mole was made with an advanced internal rod control system called the MARCS or Mechanical Animation Rod Control System. Rod Campbell received a UNIMA and TV award for outstanding achievement in Puppetry.

== Theme song (Traditional) ==
Wielie Walie:(Afrikaans)

Wielie wielie walie
Die aap ry op die balie
Tjoef tjaf,
val hy af
Wielie wielie walie

Wielie Walie: (Translated)

Wielie wielie walie
The monkey rides on the barrel
Boom bang,
he falls off
Wielie wielie walie

== See also ==
- Louise smit
- Haas Das se Nuuskas
- Verna Vels
