= Troy Beckwith =

Australian actor (1975/76–2024)

- Born: Troy Anthony Beckwith; 1975 or 1976
- Died: 24 January 2024 (aged 48)
- Occupation: Actor
- Years active: 1989–1999
- Known for: The Miraculous Mellops - Michael Mellop; Neighbours - Michael Martin; Pugwall - Jeremy "Bazza" Bazzlington

Troy Anthony Beckwith (1975 or 1976 – 24 January 2024) was an Australian television actor, known for his roles as Bazza in Pugwall and Michael Mellop in The Miraculous Mellops, as well as being the second actor to play Michael Martin in the soap opera Neighbours, from 1992 until 1994, with several guest reappearances until 1998.

== Career ==
Beckwith began his career playing Jeremy "Bazza" Bazlington in the children's television series Pugwall in 1989, appearing in 42 episodes. He went onto play Michael Mellop in the children's series The Miraculous Mellops from its beginning in 1991.

Beckwith is perhaps best known for being the second actor, after Samuel Hammington, to portray Michael Martin on Neighbours, a regular role he had from 1992 until 1994, before making guest appearances until 1998. The series often drew in large viewing figures in both Australia and the United Kingdom. Beckwith had previously played the recurring role of school bully Darren Wood prior to securing the role of Michael.

Beckwith made several other television and film appearances, including Blue Heelers, Good Guys, Bad Guys, and Chances. He also appeared in Snowy and Halifax f.p.. His final acting role was an appearance in the 1999 short film Caffeine.

== Death ==
On 28 January 2024, it was announced that Beckwith had died four days prior at the age of 48. His former Neighbours co-star Kym Valentine and his family confirmed that he had cancer. Tributes were paid across social media by family, fans and former colleagues. Beckwith asked not to have a funeral.

== Filmography ==
Year	Title	Role	Notes
1989–1991	Pugwall	Jeremy "Bazza" Bazlington	Main cast (42 episodes)
1991–1992	The Miraculous Mellops	Michael Mellop	Main cast
1991	Chances	Zeke	
1991	Neighbours	Darren Wood	Recurring role (6 episodes)
1992–1994, 1995, 1996, 1997, 1998	Neighbours	Michael Martin	Main cast (151 episodes)
1993	Snowy	Steve	
1995	Halifax f.p.	Rob Pringle	
1996	Blue Heelers	Brian Stenmark	
1998	Good Guys, Bad Guys	Smithy	
1999	Blue Heelers	Brendan Kelly	
1999	Caffeine	Troy	Short film
