= Something in the Air (TV series) =

Australian television series

- Genre: Soap opera
- Created by: Roger Simpson
- Developed by: Roger Simpson; Robyn Sinclair
- Theme music composer: John Kane and Mark Walmsley
- Opening theme: "Something in the Air Theme"
- Country of origin: Australia
- Original language: English
- No. of seasons: 3
- No. of episodes: 320

Production
- Executive producers: Mikael Borglund; Sue Masters; Rainer Mockert; Carole Sklan
- Producers: Roger Le Mesurier; Roger Simpson; Ros Tatarka; Alan Hardy
- Production locations: Clunes and Nyora
- Running time: 25 minutes 60 minutes (44 episodes)
- Production companies: Australian Broadcasting Corporation; Beyond Simpson Le Mesurier; MBP

Original release
- Network: ABC TV
- Release: 17 January 2000 – 2 May 2002

Something in the Air is an Australian television soap opera that was broadcast on ABC TV from 17 January 2000 until 2 May 2002. It was one of the first programs in Australia to be filmed in widescreen. It won the AACTA Award for Best Television Drama Series in 2001.

== Production ==
Something in the Air was the first nightly soap opera to be created and shown on ABC in over 30 years. The network had wanted to revamp its 6:30 pm timeslot and contacted several production companies and producers in a bid to find a show that would be the new lead-in to the flagship news bulletin at 7pm. ABC's head of drama Sue Masters thought a "locally made serial" would work particularly well and found the concept from writer-producers Roger Simpson and Roger Le Mesurier (Halifax f.p) was the right fit. Masters stated "What sold the show was its freshness, veracity and unembarrassed humanity. It was warm and funny with clear appeal to the broad demographic we hoped to attract, yet it threw in some truly bold shocks and played with such unexpected characters and storytelling we knew it would engage an audience." The network commissioned 160 episodes, hoping that it would be as successful as radio serial Blue Hills and television drama Bellbird.

Something in the Air takes place in the fictional Emu Springs, a struggling former gold-mining town. Storylines are "woven" around the local radio station and its announcers, including a football player, priest and socialite. The town is changed by the chaos caused by the arrival of "dethroned Sydney talkback-radio king" Tom Dooley, played by Colin Moody.

=== Broadcast and cancellation ===
The series initially screened four episodes weekly, Monday to Thursday at 6:30 pm, and was a moderate success. Ratings began to drop after the show was moved to Saturday evenings, and was cut down to two episodes shown in a one-hour block. It later resumed its four-episode weekly run, but it was screened in a 6:00 pm timeslot, putting it up against the high-rating Seven and Nine news bulletins, and that ultimately led to its cancellation.

The series was repeated on the-then ABC2 from 11 February 2008.

- Season 1:
  - Monday to Thursdays, 6:30 pm (25 minutes x 160 episodes)
- Season 2:
  - Saturdays, 7:30pm (2 episodes in a 60 minute block; first 44 episodes only)
  - Monday to Thursdays, 6:00 pm (25 minutes x 68 episodes)
- Season 3:
  - Monday to Thursdays, 6:00 pm (25 minutes x 48 episodes)

== Episodes ==
Season	Episodes	Originally released	
Season	Episodes	First released	Last released
1	160	17 January 2000	19 October 2000
2	112	3 March 2001	29 November 2001
3	48	11 February 2002	2 May 2002

== Cast ==
=== Main ===
- Eric Bana as Joe Sabatini (2000–01)
- Ray Barrett as Len Taylor
- Ulli Birvé as Helen Virtue
- Alan Brough as Warren Brown (2000)
- Danielle Carter as Sally Sabatini
- Vince Colosimo as Joe Sabatini (2001), replaced Eric Bana
- Kate Fitzpatrick as Julia Rutherford
- Frankie J. Holden as Stuart McGregor
- Melita Jurisic as Dr. Eva Petrovska
- Colin Moody as Tom Dooley
- Roger Oakley as Doug Rutherford
- Anne Phelan as Monica Taylor
- Jeremy Lindsay Taylor as Ryan Cassidy
- Steve Adams as Father Brian
- Tony Bonner as Bill Mackay
- Nina Liu as Dr Annie Young

=== Recurring / guests ===
- Matt King as Rolo (14 episodes)
- Arianthe Galani as Nanny Sophia
- Alan Hopgood as Bill Mackay
- Andrew Curry as Shaun Graves (3 episodes)
- Benjamin McNair as Ron Thomas (2 episodes)
- Bernard Curry as Sean Wright (3 episodes)
- Brett Climo as Steve Saks (3 episodes)
- Bud Tingwell as William Brown (7 episodes)
- Carmen Duncan as Margaret Jenkins (3 episodes)
- Christine Stephen-Daly as Stephanie Bennett (4 episodes)
- Eddie Baroo as Dingo / Skid Lightfoot / Entrant A (6 episodes)
- Elena Mandalis as Cheryl Stephanopoulas (2 episodes)
- Georgina Naidu as Ms Gibbs (1 episode)
- James Condon
- Jane Hall as Janine Baker (2 episodes)
- John McTernan as Owen Young (5 episodes)
- Kristy Wright as Lisa Cambridge (13 episodes)
- Mark Mitchell as Neville McGregor (5 episodes)
- Martin Copping as Jimmy Hibberd (4 episodes)
- Michael Veitch as Ralph Dewey (3 episodes)
- Nicholas Bell as Michael Fox (5 episodes)
- Peter Curtin as Father Mitchell (2 episodes)
- Reg Gorman as Ken (4 episodes)
- Richard Morgan as Miles Middlemass (3 episodes)
- Russell Kiefel as Tas (4 episodes)
- Samuel Johnson as Dermot Yates (7 episodes)
- Sean Scully as Paddy (2 episodes)
- Sophie Lee as Jennifer Leveson (4 episodes)
- Sue Jones as Judy (5 episodes)
- Sullivan Stapleton as Wayne Taylor (4 episodes)
- Susan Lyons as Sue Smithies (5 episodes)
- Tommy Dysart
- Tara Morice as Candy Rogers
- Terry Norris as Fred (5 episodes)
- Victoria Eagger as Lorraine McGregor (16 episodes)

== Accolades ==
The cast and crew of Something in the Air won two Australian Film Institute Awards and were nominated for seven more.

Year	Category	Nominee(s)	Result	Ref.
2000	Best Episode in a Television Drama Series (Long)	"Movers and Shakers" – Roger Le Mesurier, Roger Simpson, Ros Tatarka	Nominated	
2000	Best Episode in a Television Drama Series (Long)	"We Will Remember Them" – Roger Le Mesurier, Roger Simpson, Ros Tatarka	Nominated	
2000	Best Achievement in Direction in a Television Drama	Richard Jasek for "We Will Remember Them"	Nominated	
2000	Best Screenplay in a Television Drama	Katherine Thomson for "We Will Remember Them"	Nominated	
2000	Best Actress in a Leading Role in a Television Drama	Anne Phelan for "We Will Remember Them"	Won	
2001	Best Television Drama Series	That One Defining Moment" – Roger Le Mesurier, Roger Simpson and Alan Hardy	Won	
2001	Best Television Drama Series	"Into Thy Hands" – Roger Le Mesurier, Roger Simpson and Alan Hardy	Nominated	
2001	Best Television Drama Series	"Living in the Past" – Roger Le Mesurier, Roger Simpson and Alan Hardy	Nominated	
2001	Best Guest or Supporting Actor in a Television Drama	Steve Adams for "That One Defining Moment"	Nominated	
