= The Knicky Knacky Knoo Show =

1970s South African television program

- Genre: Comedy
- Starring: Hal Orlandini, Rod Hudson
- Original language: English

Original release
- Release: January 5, 1976

The Knicky Knacky Knoo Show was a South African variety show that gained popularity in the 1970s.

Airing during the early years of South African television broadcasting, the show featured light-hearted content and comedic segments aimed at younger audiences. The first edition was broadcast on 5 January 1976, the date regular broadcasts began.

== Content ==
At a time when South African television was still in its infancy and heavily influenced by imported content particularly from the United States, the Knicky Knacky Knoo Show stood out as a local production that resonated with young viewers. Its place in the cultural memory of 1970s South African youth underscores its role in shaping early children's programming in the country. The series starred Hal Orlandini and Rod Hudson. The first edition was touted as being as good as foreign productions.

== Legacy ==
Footage from the show resurfaced in 2008 on the third episode of SABC 2's Where Were You?.
