= Louise Smit =

South African writer

- Born: 2 January 1940 (age 85)
- Occupation(s): Writer, Children's writer, Television director

Louise Smit (née Louise Sophia Bekker, born 2 January 1940) is a South African writer of children's books and creator and director of children's television programmes and characters.

== Biography ==
Smit studied teaching at Paarl Teachers College, and Drama at the University of Stellenbosch. From 1964-1968 she did charitable work in Malawi where she performed indigenous folktales with the participation of the local children in the rural areas. This led to a weekly children's radio programme in the Chichewa language.

Returning to South Africa, she joined the Johannesburg Civic Theatre as a puppeteer before accepting the position as programme director and creator at the South African Broadcasting Corporation (SABC). Her first programmes, Haas Das se Nuuskas (featuring a rabbit news anchor wearing flashy ties) and Wielie Walie, were national hits. Haas Das se Nuuskas was also one of the first programmes to be aired on South African television in 1975. Louise is the creator of Wielie Walie, (she wrote the first 200 episodes), Haas Das se Nuuskas (150 episodes) Pumpkin Patch (500 episodes), Kideo (1000 episodes) Mina Moo en Kie (150 episodes ),Zap Mag and Professor Fossilus en die Dinosourusse (26 episodes) amongst others . She produced around 4000 programmes in seven languages and according to many, probably created the most characters in the world. She also created, directed and produced programmes in Zulu, Xhosa, Sotho, Pedi, and Tswana. Louise Smit directed the first 26 episodes of Liewe Heksie, created by Verna Vels.

In 1980 Smit formed her own company, Louise Smit Productions and built her own television studio, Kinnor Studios in Johannesburg. She sold it to Red Pepper Productions in 1998.

She has a daughter and currently lives in Cologne, Germany.

== Children’s Programmes ==
- Haas Das se Nuuskas — Haas Das and Piet Muis, Koning Leeu, etc. (in Afrikaans). A Rabbit with flashy ties reading news from Animal Land.
- Pumpkin Patch — Woofles the security dog, the cousins Speckles and Freckles etc. (in English). All the adventures of a community in a little town.
- Mina Moo & Co. — Mina Moo (a lovable cow), Bak en Terie (Bac and Teria), King Mick, Micka etc. (in Afrikaans and English).
- Professor Fossi en die Dinosourusse — A German Palaeontologist builds antime machine and visits the Dinosaurs (in Afrikaans).
- Kideo — Timothy Traddle (a tortoise), Mr. Chinwag (a donkey). A playroom programme (in English).
- Wielie Walie — Karel Kraai, Sarel Seemonster, Bytjie, Bennie Boekwurm, Wagga Wagga Kwag, Meend die Eend (in Afrikaans). A playroom series (running time - 18 years).

== Books ==
Louise Smit is a well-known writer and has published more than 25 books. They include:

- Die Bybel vir Kinders/ The Bible for Children (1982/2002)
- Professor Fossilus en die dinosaurs (2004), illustrated by Marjorie van Heerden
- Haas Das se Nuuskas (2006), illustrated by Fred Mouton
- Haas Das raak weg! (2007), illustrated by Tanja Joubert
- Wielie Wielie Walie (2010), illustrated by Sean Verster

== Awards ==
Louise Smit received national and international acclaim for her work.

Seven Artes awards for best magazine programme and children's programmes, SABC

Two Star Tonight Awards for Liewe Heksie (as director) and a series in Tswana: Kabarete ya Poone (Cabaret of the Mielies (Corn))

Unima Award for best contribution to puppetry in South Africa

M-Net Award for a children's programme: Eko-Boffins

Tokio International Television Prize (Japan Prize) for Kideo - most innovative programme, 1995

Prix de Jeunesse prize, Munich, 1996, third prize for Kideo (Denmark 1st, BBC 2nd, Sesame Street 4th)

ATKV Woordveertjie for Bennie Boekwurm se Tonnelhuisie - NB-Publishers

South African Literary Award (SALA) for her life achievement work.

== See also ==
- Haas Das se Nuuskas
- Wielie Walie
- Liewe Heksie
