= Verna Vels =

- Born: Verna Barbara Robertson Vels; 13 June 1933; Reitz, Orange Free State, South Africa
- Died: 21 August 2014 (aged 81)
- Occupations: Writer and radio/television personality

Verna Barbara Robertson Vels (13 June 1933 – 21 August 2014) was a South African writer and radio/television personality. She was responsible for programs on art and programs concerning youth. She was closely involved in the planning of television programs for the establishment of the Afrikaans service and started the children's magazine. Her most famous work was Liewe Heksie; the stories were originally written for radio and later published and edited for television and video.

== Biography ==
Verna Vels was born in Reitz, Orange Free State, South Africa. She attended the University of Pretoria, and in 1954 she completed a BA degree, majoring in Afrikaans and Dutch, English, and Art History.

In December 1954, she started working as a radio presenter at the SABC in Durban, where she developed an interest in children's programmes. In 1963, she transferred to Johannesburg. In 1968 she worked for a year at Radio Netherlands in Hilversum Wereldomroep. In 1973 she moved to Durban as organiser of the Afrikaans Programmes in Natal and became the first woman appointed as the organiser in a region. In 1974, Vels returned to Johannesburg, where she was appointed by Television as organiser of Afrikaans magazine that included children's programmes. Programs such as Kraaines and Wielie Walie were created under her guidance. For all the years of its existence, she voiced Wielie Walie's Bennie bookworm. In the two years before Television officially aired (on 5 January 1976), Vels was involved in the production and planning of programs and ultimately in the purchase of programs in foreign countries. She started writing for the radio early in her career, and most of this work was finally published.

The first Liewe Heksie (Dear little witch) stories were broadcast on radio in 1961. Several Liewe Heksie series aired.

The first "Liewe Heksie" books were published in 1965 by the publishers Human & Rousseau. Over the years, a total of 10 books, eight records, and numerous CDs, videos, and DVDs were produced. The latest book was "Liewe Heksie en die rekenaar" (Dear little witch and the computer) which appeared in 1999 (illustrated by Piet Grobler). Liewe Heksie made its television debut in 1978 in a series of 26 programs. A second series followed in 1981. For a total of 52 television programs, Vels edited old stories and wrote new stories. The series also gave rise to a number of books with illustrations from television. Liewe Heksie also appeared in plays for children at venues such as the Nico Malan-theatre in Cape Town, the Sand du Plessis Theatre in Bloemfontein and the State Theatre in Pretoria. Vels also wrote Liewe Heksie dramas for the "Klein Karoo Nasionale Kunstefees" and the Drama Department of the University of Pretoria to celebrate their thirtieth anniversary.

Vels wrote a youth novel, Alet, in 1965 for the radio; it was published in 1978 by Perskor-Publishers. She arranged several radio dramas, and did original writing for the radio programs. Original plays like for the former Little-Theatre included Helen of Troy Clemens and Uncle Bob go together and conclusion tale. It was broadcast twice. In February 1983, she was appointed Programme Director for TV1 (Afrikaans) the highest position a woman held in those years. After some restructuring within the SABC, she held several other positions and retired in 1993 after a career of nearly four decades in radio and television.

== Awards ==
She received several awards from Cultural Institutions, including:

- Die Federasie van Rapportryerskorpse for the publications of the Liewe Heksie-Family (1985).
- Medal of Honour for Cultural Advancement of Women (1993).
- Artes of the SABC for her contributions to Broadcasting.
- FAK for promoting Performing Arts (1996).
- C.P. Hoogenhout Award for Children of UNISA (2002).

== Death ==
Verna Vels died from cancer on Thursday, 21 August 2014, at the age of 81.

== Books ==
- Die Groot Liewe Heksie-Storieboek (1970s), illustrated by Dorothy Hill, ISBN 9780798134262
- Lekker Liewe Heksie Stories (1970s), illustrated by Dorothy Hill, ISBN 9780798134255
- Liewe Heksie en die rugbywedstryd (1988), illustrated by Nikki Jones, ISBN 0798121858
- Liewe Heksie en die rekenaar (1999), illustrated by Piet Grobler, ISBN 9780798139212
- Liewe Heksie Omnibus (2002), illustrated by Piet Grobler, ISBN 9780798142212

== Voices for TV ==
- Wielie Walie: Bennie Boekwurm's voice
- Liewe Heksie: Liewe Heksie, Blommie and Matewis's voices
- Haas Das hou konsert: Klein Stinkie Muishond's voice

== See also ==
- Liewe Heksie
- Louise Smit
- Wielie Walie
- Haas Das se Nuuskas
