= Pumpkin Patch (TV series) =

- Pumpkin Patch
- Genre: Children's television series
- Written by: Louise Smit
- Presented by: William Abdul; Laurel McCulloch
- Voices of: Adrian Galley; John Rothman; Anton Schmidt
- Country of origin: South Africa
- Original language: English

Production
- Producer: Ken Hardy

Original release
- Network: SABC
- Release: 1987 – 1991

Pumpkin Patch is an English language South African children's television series that combined live-action, sketch comedy, and puppetry that aired on SABC TV1 from 1987 to 1991. The series takes place in the fictional South African town of Pumpkin Patch and features Uncle Bill the town's mayor, presenter Laurel, Woofles the watchdog, and the vegetarian puppet cousins Freckles and Speckles. The cast included William Abdul as Uncil Bill, Laurel McCulloch as Laurel, Adrian Galley as Woofles, John Rothman voiced Speckles and Anton Schmidt voiced Freckles.

It was the first TV1 television show to feature a non-white presenter. The show's featuring of a mixed race cast and vegetarian, possibly homosexual, characters during the socially conservative apartheid period in South African history was noted by South African comedian and commentator Martin Evans.
