= Zoe and Charlie =

French series of animated short

Zoe and Charlie is a TVO Kids English retitle of the French series of animated shorts Léa et Gaspard which still airs on Unis. It began airing in 1993.

It had 26 episodes each 5 minutes long, and Alain Jaspard is the co-screenwriter, and was directed by Gilles Gay.
