= The Authentic Adventures of Professor Thompson =

- title screen
- Spanish: Las Autenticas Aventuras del Profesor Thompson
- Genre: Adventure
- Created by: Juan Ramon Pina; Roberto Marcano; Manuel Almela
- Written by: Juan Ramon Pina
- Directed by: Juan Ramon Pina
- Theme music composer: Eduardo Armenteros
- Country of origin: Spain
- No. of episodes: 26

Production
- Executive producers: Jose Joaquin Aguirre; Jose Luis Perona; Jose Maria Leyva
- Running time: 20-25 mins
- Production companies: Federal Animation Picture; Televisión Española

Original release
- Network: TVE
- Release: 1992 – 1994

The Authentic Adventures of Professor Thompson (Spanish: Las Autenticas Aventuras del Profesor Thompson) is a hand-drawn cartoon series produced by Federal Animation Picture and Televisión Española. It has also been translated and broadcast in England (on Channel 4), France (La Cinquième, Canal J), Germany (on RTL II), Poland (on TVP2, TV Polonia) and Sri Lanka (on Dynavision).

== Plot ==
Professor Thompson stumbles on to an Egyptian Pharaoh Apestophis who has travelled forward in time with a miniature pyramid-shaped time-travelling device. Thompson and his short Russian friend Boris subsequently agrees to help him get back to his time. Meanwhile, German explorer Frida von Krugen learns of the device and with the help of her flat-headed scientist husband Otto, tries to get it away from the pharaoh. Trouble ensures as the struggle over the pyramid takes them to various points in history.

== Cast and production ==
- Music - Eduardo Armenteros
- Story Board - Marcano, Almela, and Valentin Domenech
- Voice Director - Luis Lorenzo
- Professor Thompson (voice - Spanish) - Francisco Portes
- Boris (voice - Spanish) - Ángel De Andrés
- Frida von Krugen (voice - Spanish) - Julia Trujillo
- Otto von Krugen (voice - Spanish) - Narciso Ibáñez Menta
- Apestophis (voice - Spanish) - Manolo Andrés
- Sepis (voice - Spanish) - Ismael Abellan
- Porotosis (voice - Spanish) - Jesús Prieto
- Helga (voice - Spanish) - Luisa Armenteros
- Peter (voice - Spanish) - Laila Ripoll
- Lasagna (voice - Spanish) - Luis Lorenzo
