= Jason Torrens =

Australian actor and musician

- Born: 20 May 1975 (age 51); Melbourne, Victoria, Australia
- Occupations: Actor, musician, educator
- Years active: 1989–1996 (actor); 1997–present (musician)

Jason Torrens (born 20 May 1975) is an Australian musician and former actor.

Torrens is best known for his role as Peter Unwin George Wall ("Pugwall") in the 1989 children's television series Pugwall. Other notable roles include Dillon Renshaw in Neighbours in 1996 and Duncan in Newlyweds in 1993.

Torrens was a founding member of Middle Eastern surf band The Reefers, and is the drummer in Melbourne heavy rock act Bugdust.

Torrens is currently the Head of Audio Engineering at the Australian College of the Arts.
