= The Miraculous Mellops (TV series) =

- Genre: Comedy; Science fiction
- Created by: Karl Zwicky; Margarita Tassone
- Starring: Troy Beckwith; David Walters; Sally Warwick; Bill Conn; Julie Godfrey; Max Phipps; Michela Noonan; Drew Forsythe; Kim Walsh
- Theme music composer: Chris Harriott
- Opening theme: We Need A Miracle
- Composer: Chris Harriott
- Country of origin: Australia
- Original language: English
- No. of series: 2
- No. of episodes: 40

Production
- Executive producer: Ian Fairweather
- Running time: 20 minutes

Original release
- Network: Network Ten
- Release: 25 November 1991 – 4 December 1992

The Miraculous Mellops is an Australian sci-fi/comedy television series, created by Karl Zwicky and Margarita Tassone and produced by Film Australia and Millennium Pictures in association with the Network Ten. Aimed at children, the first season screened on Australian television in 1991 with the second season of the series screening in 1992.

== Cast ==
=== Main cast ===
- Troy Beckwith as Michael Mellop
- Lauren Hewett as Ebony / Minion
- Michela Noonan as Harmony Dump
- David Walters as Jason Mellop
- Sally Warwick as Samantha Mellop
- Bill Conn aa Bill Mellop
- Max Phipps as Bernie Dump
- Drew Forsythe as Ralph
- Julie Godfrey as Aunt Jocelyn
- Kim Walsh as Jane
- Damon Herriman as Felix
- Frankie J Holden as Narrator

=== Guest cast ===
- Abe Forsythe as Small Boy
- Abigail as Iron Peg (1 episode)
- Craig Pearce as Grub (3 episodes)
- Dave Gibson as Grand Baby
- Glenda Linscott as Professor Moorcroft (3 episodes)
- Katy Manning as Window Guru (2 episodes)
- Maggie Kirkpatrick as Mrs. Kafka (2 episodes)

== Synopsis ==
The series centred on a group of teenagers, two brothers and a sister; Michael, Jason and Samantha Mellop. A year earlier, their mother has died and their family business, 'The Lazy Daisy Nursery' is run by their rationalist father Bill and absent-minded Aunt Josey. The general plot of both seasons were the strange events that the Mellop teens would often get caught up in, without their father or aunt noticing and/or believing them.

As well as the Mellops coming across the adventures, another family would often stick their noses into the situation when not wanted. This other family, The Dumps, consisted of a trailer trash entrepreneur father; Bernie, his conniving daughter Harmony, and his annoying nephew Darren. The Dumps would often try to use the events that fell upon the Mellops for their own selfish gain.

=== Season 1 ===
The first season centred on the "Search for the Grand Baby" plot. An alien race of children exist on the moon, known as Moonlings. Their leader, The Grand Baby, is fast approaching the end of his life, and without an heir, it is decided that a great power will be sent to Earth to choose a new leader for the people there. The power itself, consisting of all the psychic and magical abilities that the Grand Baby possessed, arrived on Earth but hit the Mellops' crystal punchbowl, "splitting" around the house, hitting several household items.

Suddenly, the Mellop teens start to notice the powers associated with the items. For example; the T-Shirt of invisibility, the baseball cap of flight, the vacuum cleaner of time travel and even the toothpaste of linguistic ability. Of course, it isn't long before the Dumps hear of the powers, and concoct their own schemes to get a hold of the powers for selfish purposes such as business ventures by Bernie. Seeing no harm in the use of the powers, Michael Mellop, smitten with Harmony's charms, would often help the Dumps acquire the powers.

It isn't long before the Moonlings notice what has gone wrong, and send two of their most elite emissaries to sort out the situation. Gamma-Jane and Alpha-Ralph take a space-ship, disguised as a VW Kombi and fly to Earth. They take human form, unaware that their outfits are completely ridiculous, and rename themselves simply Jane and Ralph. Jane and Ralph spend a few days driving around in the Kombi, asking confused Sydney citizens if they are aware of who the new Grand Baby is. It isn't long before their investigation leads them to the Mellops' household.

After explaining their situation to the Mellop teens, it is decided that Jane and Ralph will stay in the Mellop household, and complete their quest with the Mellops' help. Samantha tells Bill that Jane and Ralph are friends from school who are staying over during the school holidays. Together, the Mellops and the Moonlings do their best to collect up the remaining powers. Jane concludes that once they have all the powers, they will be able to find out who the chosen new Grand Baby is. And so, begins the search and discovery, which is harder than it may seem with the Dumps constantly trying to get their hands on the powers themselves.

After all the powers are finally collected, and the Dumps have taken advantage of the Moonlings' flying Kombi, it seemed the Mellops had tried everyone in the household to find out if they were the new Grand Baby. To no avail, after trying all the Mellops and Dumps family members, it is finally discovered that the new Grand Baby is none other than the Mellops' family dog, Ajax.

Ajax is brought to the Moon, and hailed as the new leader. After a tearful goodbye, Jane and Ralph go back to the Moon to educate Ajax on being a royal ruler. The Mellops prepare for a "normal life", but things don't stay quiet for long.

=== Season 2 ===
On the distant Earth-like planet of "Peaceful", the serene planet is under attack by an awful race of huge monstrous creatures known as Grubs. The Grubs use rayguns to turn whatever they find into toffee before devouring it. They have done this to countless planets before.

Meanwhile, on Earth, Bill has purchased a fax machine for the Mellops' business, and plans to re-open the nursery with a grand gala party. Samantha instantly feels that this would be a fantastic opportunity to catch up with Jane and Ralph. Samantha, wanting to be the first to use the fax machine, sends an invitation for the party to the same phone-number she uses to contact Jane on the Moon only to found out the fax number belongs to the Grubs who receive the invitation, and trace it back to Earth. Knowing that Earth is the home of the Sydney Opera House, and it would make a delicious meal, the Grubs instantly send a 3D video-fax back to Samantha saying they accept. Confused, Samantha calls the Grubs' back and tells them they aren't actually invited. The Grubs' are annoyed and disappointed; and decide they will go to the party and eat whatever they find on Earth.

Instantly, Samantha decides she must go to the Grubs' planet and convince them face-to-face to not come but does not know how. The Mellops instantly enlist the help of Darren Dump, who is never seen without his laptop, to look up information on the internet on long distance space travel.

Darren finds information on a forum called the Pan-Galactic Bulletin Board. The best way would be through a travelling device known as a "WOOP", or a "Window of Opportunity". With alterations, any normal window will do, however a massive power source is needed to power it. Normal batteries don't get the WOOP very far, so Samantha gets Jane to send her a "Cold Fusion Reactor", the same thing that powers the Moonlings' space ships. This also is not enough.

Darren contacts a smart young girl on the forum named Ebony (who is later revealed to be really a grown up grub) lives in a black hole and has long been awaiting guests at her own party who have never arrived. Rather than simply emailing Ebony, Ebony actually appears as a 3D hologram to give the Mellops' and Darren advice on how to use the WOOP and other devices of some help in the quest to stop the Grubs. Ebony advises that the Mellops will need a "Compressed Sun", however, a Compressed Sun would blind any normal human being. Ebony has one she can give them, however it must be kept in an anti-matter paper bag.

In order to get an anti-matter paper bag, the Mellops must go to an alternate universe, one of anti-matter and retrieve one there. The Mellops convince Bernie Dump to go, because if any of the Mellops were to go to the anti-matter universe, and were to run into themselves there, the results would be cataclysmic. Bernie is very unlikely to be in the Mellop household in the other universe. Bernie does go, and finds the anti-matter universe is the same world, albeit looking reversed. Bill and Aunt Josey are there, wearing each other's clothes. Likewise, Jane and Ralph are even there, wearing each other's clothes. Seems the Mellops are still searching for the Grand Baby in this universe. Bernie manages to get a paper bag and come back through the WOOP, however is forced to bring the Bill, Josey and Ralph from the other universe back with him.

Confusion abound, Jason does his best to keep the anti-matter Bill and Josey as far away from the matter Bill and Josey until they can be returned to their own universe. Bernie prevents the Mellops from using the WOOP, claiming he now owns it. After some confusion, and the anti-matter Bill and Josey accidentally destroying the Mellops' nursery, the anti-matter Bill, Josey and Ralph are sent back to the anti-matter universe. The Mellops coerce Dump into giving them back the WOOP, and send Ebony the anti-matter paper bag. Ebony puts the compressed sun in it, and sends it back to them. Now with a Compressed Sun as a power source, the Mellops will finally be able to go to the Grubs' planet.

Before going through with the final plan, Samantha gets Jane and Ralph to come back to Earth to help rebuild the nursery. Ralph has some tricks up his sleeve and is quite helpful.

Following this, Samantha and Michael take the WOOP and go to the Grubs' planet. Finally being able to confront them, Samantha explains to the Grubs' the importance of growing up, and learning not to be destructive and hurtful to others.

The Grubs have been stuck in this stage of their evolution to a faulty clock that exists in the black hole with Ebony. Darren is able to provide Ebony with instructions on how to fix it, and when it starts chiming, trees grow around the Grubs. It's revealed that Ebony is actually a grown up Grub. Samantha and Michael are then successful in convincing the Grubs to "climb a tree" and build themselves cocoons for growing up.

Having saved the world, the two head back to Earth, and help prepare the nearly rebuilt nursery for the gala party. The gala is successful, and ends with the now grown-up Grubs sending one last 3D video-fax to and thanking the Mellops through song and appearing in the night sky.

Meanwhile, Ebony has left her Black Hole, and come to the party along with some other grown up grubs. Darren has also decided he prefers the company of the Mellops to that of his own family. Meanwhile, Bernie Dump's many debts from failed business ventures catch up to him, and the bank takes his trailer, the only thing he had left. He and Harmony watch the Grubs singing in the night sky, now left with only each other.
