= Mmabatho Television =

- Country: Bophuthatswana (until 1994); South Africa (1994–1998)
- Broadcast area: Bophuthatswana (until 1994); South Africa (1994–1998)

Programming
- Languages: Tswana, English

Ownership
- Owner: Bophuthatswana Broadcasting Corporation
- Sister channels: Bop TV (until 1998)

History
- Launched: 1990; 36 years ago
- Closed: 1998; 28 years ago

Mmabatho Television was a television station owned by the Bophuthatswana Broadcasting Corporation, sister to Bop TV and with a public service profile, similar to sister station Radio Mmabatho. Broadcasting from the city of Mmabatho (hence its name), it was available to all of Bophuthatswana via terrestrial television and all of Africa via satellite. It was known for its educational and religious programming.

== History ==
Mmabatho TV was set up in 1990 as a public service television station broadcasting in both English and Tswana. Its satellite signal was available free of charge in Bophuthatswana, where it was fed to terrestrial relay stations, and across Africa as an additional subscription service to Bop TV's satellite signal. From the beginning, the station carried educational programming, at a time when the SABC did not have such a service. The educational programming was carried on a subservice known as Edutel, which, up until 1991, was carried on Bop TV. In May 1994, Mmabatho TV was included on Multichoice's analogue satellite decoder, sold in a bundle with Bop TV, following an agreement to carry the two channels.

The station was in jeopardy in September 1995 when a preliminary decision to shut down Boputhatswana Broadcasting Corporation as a whole following the reintegration of Bophuthatswana into South Africa took place. It closed in 1998, subsequently, some of its staff made it to the Midi-E TV bid for a national private channel, which eventually became e.tv.
