= Pugwall =

Television series

- Also known as: Pugwall's Summer (Series 2)
- Created by: Margaret Clark
- Starring: Jason Torrens; Troy Beckwith; Ricky Fleming; Jay McCormack; Gareth Morley; Rebecca Blomberg; Louise Hall; Ken James; Emma Snow; Elspeth Ballantyne; Maurie Fields
- Country of origin: Australia
- No. of series: 2
- No. of episodes: 42

Production
- Running time: 25 minutes

Original release
- Network: Nine Network
- Release: 13 June 1989 – 9 August 1991

Pugwall is an Australian children's television series which first screened on the Nine Network in 1989. Based on Margaret Clark's young adult fiction novels of the same name, it revolves around the title character Peter Unwin George Wall, "PUGWALL", and his friends as they form a band. Season 2 was titled Pugwall's Summer.

== Premise ==
After receiving an electric guitar on his 13th birthday, Pugwall and his friends, Bazza, Orfo, and Stringbean form a band, but they need a lead singer. Whilst in hospital after a bicycle accident, Pugwall meets a girl called Jenny, they become friends and he asks her if she can sing. She tells him she can and he asks her to join the band; she agrees and the Orange Organics is formed. Each episode follows Pugwall's trials and tribulations as he goes about his family life, and follows the band as they attempt to secure a recording contract with a record company.

== The Orange Organics ==
- Peter Unwin George Wall (Pugwall) – guitar and vocals
- Jenny Fleet – lead vocals
- Jeremy Bazlington (Bazza) – keyboard
- Yuri Orfonsinski (Orfo) – drums
- Stringbean – bass guitar

== Character profiles ==
Pugwall

Pugwall (Jason Torrens) is a typical teenage boy, who dreams of being a rock-star and "earning a million dollars before breakfast". When he receives an electric guitar for his 13th birthday, he thinks his dreams are finally coming true, but his parents did not get him an amplifier. He forms a rock band with his friends and starts to raise money.

Jenny Fleet

Jenny (Rebecca Blomberg) meets Pugwall at the hospital at the end of the second episode after he is in an accident after dreaming of stardom while riding his bike. Jenny is a shy girl who finds herself having feelings for Pugwall, but does not know how to act on her feelings.

When Jenny and Pugwall met she was in a wheelchair, it is often hinted at in the show that her accident was due to a dark secret. This was somewhat confirmed towards the end of the series when Pugwall develops feelings for her.

Bazza

Bazza (Troy Beckwith) is the keyboard player in the band. His real name is Jeremy James Bazzlington. He has a younger brother, Jimmy. His father, Tony is frequently absent on business trips.

Orfo

Orfo (Jay McCormack) is the Organics' drummer and Pugwall's best friend. His real name is Yuri Orfonsinski and is of Russian descent and lives with his parents. The band rehearse in his garage much to the annoyance of his neighbour Mrs Walker. Orfo's father makes sparing appearances in the first season, while his mother, Anatasia, who often cooks a lot of food for the band, appears frequently in the second.

Stringbean

Stringbean (Ricky Fleming) is the band's bass guitarist. He gets his nickname because he is tall and thin. His parents run a farm, and Stringbean works there each morning "mucking out the stables". His real name is never revealed on the show, but his parents are listed on the end credits of one episode as Mr and Mrs Millard, and Bashem calls him "Millard" in class. Stringbean is shown to eat a lot but still remains thin.

Hughesy

Hughesy (Gareth Morley) is responsible for the band's sound and is in charge of the recording equipment. He appears from the second season.

Margaret "Supes" Wall

Supes (Louise Hall) is Pugwall's mother. Pugwall calls his mum Supes because when she cleans the house she is like Superman, speeding around the house at super-speed.

Frank "Herohead" Wall

Herohead (Ken James) is Pugwall's father. He works for a real estate agency and generally disapproves of Pugwall's dream of stardom and would rather he was a doctor or lawyer.

Marion "Marmaloid" Wall

Marion (Emma Snow) is Pugwall's bratty younger sister. She is a constant thorn in Pugwall's side. She keeps pestering her brother to let her join the band. He keeps telling her that she can not join the band. She loves Caramello Koalas (a type of chocolate) and is sometimes seen to take payment in these bars in exchange for not telling her parents what Pugwall is up to. She also loves Garfield, and has many of these stuffed toys and posters in her room. She can play the guitar well, and takes over for Pugwall on one song on the album when he sprains his wrist and can not play. She also has her own band, the Marmalodians, with her best friend Melissa and their friends (Pammie, Francie, Carrie and Emmie), and they featured on the Orange Organics album with "The Marmaloid Rap".

Con Tarcopolis and Wazza

(played by Peter Tzefrios and Anthony Engelman, respectively) Pugwall's primary antagonists who try invariably to make Pugwall's life a misery. More often than not their schemes will ultimately backfire on them. They have their own theme music "Bad Boys" which generally appears in any scene they are in. Con is seen as Pugwall's main rival and the brains of the outfit, whereas Wazza is his sidekick.

Daniella Valentina

(played by Marcella Toro) Pugwall's secondary nemesis who always wants to sing with the band. She becomes Orfo's girlfriend in "St. Valentina's". She works at a fish and chip shop and will not hesitate to bribe band members with offers of free food.

Aunt Annabelle

(played by Elspeth Ballantyne) Herohead's aunt, and sister to Harry. She can seem eccentric. She gives the band access to her recording studio to record their album, and finds a record company to release their album.

Uncle Harry

(played by Maurie Fields) Herohead's uncle, always turns up when he hears Annabelle is in town. His tendency to drop in on the family unexpectedly and interrupt their meals often irritates them. At the mere hint of hard work (i.e. dishwashing), Harry makes excuses to leave but ultimately changes his mind whenever dessert is mentioned.

Dr Pongerton

(played by Frank Bren) The principal of Greythorn High who frequently lectures Pugwall and at times praises him.

Bashem

(played by Roy Edmunds) Bashem is Pugwall's stern teacher who will not hesitate to punish him or any other members of the class. In one episode he suffers a heart attack during a cross-country race and Pugwall forfeits winning to save his life.

Summerbum

(played by Jennifer Jarman-Walker) Summerbum is another of Pugwall's teachers.

== Soundtracks ==
A soundtrack featuring all of the music heard in the show was released for each series on vinyl and cassette. This was nominated for the ARIA Award for Best Children's Album in 1990.

=== Pugwall ===
Pugwall: Original Music from the Television Series

Soundtrack album by Various artists
- Released: 1989
- Genre: Children's rock
- Labels: Fable; 792782

==== Track listing ====
1. A1. "Opening Theme" – 5:02
2. A2. "A Rock and a Roll." – 4:08
3. A3. "Dogs" (Instrumental) – 4:06
4. A4. "There's No Reason Why" – 3:42
5. A5. "Pugwall Instrumental 1" – 5:17
6. A6. "I'm in Love" – 2:59
7. A7. "Na Na Na" – 2:21
8. A8. "It Must Be Love" – 2:44
9. A9. "Pugwall Instrumental 2" – 1:24
10. B1. "Party Song" – 2:03
11. B2. "Was There Something" – 3:17
12. B3. "Supes" – 0:47
13. B4. "Only Ewe" – 1:47
14. B5. "Pugwall Instrumental 3" – 2:00
15. B6. "B B Boppin'" – 1:14
16. B7. "Belly Dance" – 1:34
17. B8. "You So and So" – 2:31
18. B9. "I'm Gonna Tell Your Mama" – 0:56
19. B10. "Uptown Tokyo" – 1:54
20. B11. "Closing Credits Theme" – 1:30

=== Pugwall's Summer ===
Pugwall's Summer

Soundtrack album by Various artists
- Released: 1990
- Genre: Rock
- Labels: Mushroom; L26056

==== Track listing ====
===== Side 1 =====
1. Pugwall's Summer (Instrumental) – Orange Organics
2. True Blues – Orange Organics
3. Bad Boys – Marcee Jones
4. Hoochie Coochie – Maurie Fields
5. Uptown Tokyo – Orange Organics
6. Marmaloid Rap – Emma Snow, Aimee Robertson and the Marmaloidians
7. Mix It Up Pugwall – Andrea Lees
8. Single Word – Orange Organics
9. His Eyes – Orange Organics
10. Pugwall's Summer (Slow) – Darryl Cotton

===== Side 2 =====
1. Lately – No Justice
2. A Rock and a Roll – Maurie Fields
3. Somebody To Love – Orange Organics
4. Ever Be The Same – Rebecca Blomberg
5. It's Alright – Orange Organics
6. Baby Let's Dance – Simone Robertson
7. The Things People Do (Environment Song) – Orange Organics
8. Pugwall's Summer – Darryl Cotton
9. Party Song – Orange Organics

== DVD release ==
Pugwall series 1, a two-disc set, was released on PAL Region 4 DVD in Australia while Pugwall series 2, Pugwall's Summer, was later released on DVD. These are available at EZY DVD, Sanity.com.au and other Australian online retailers.

== International broadcasts ==
The series was primarily broadcast in the UK on Channel 4 in the mornings during the school holidays and sometimes on Sundays, and also on TCC. Trouble also aired the show for several weeks in 1998. It was also broadcast in South Africa in the early 1990s on KTV – channel M-Net, and again a few years later on Tube – channel SABC2.
