= Liewe Heksie =

- Created by: Verna Vels
- Based on: Radio stories by Verna Vels
- Directed by: Louise Smit; Dalene Kotzé
- Opening theme: "Hulle noem haar Liewe Heksie"
- Country of origin: South Africa
- Original language: Afrikaans
- No. of seasons: 2
- No. of episodes: 52

Production
- Production company: SABC

Original release
- Network: SABC
- Release: September 5, 1978 – May 11, 1982

Liewe Heksie (Beloved Little Witch) is a fictional character developed by children's book author Verna Vels.

Liewe Heksie's first radio appearance was in 1961 as part of the Afrikaans children's program, Siembamba, which was followed by a 1963 radio series. Originally Blommie, rather than Liewe Heksie, was the main character, both of whom were voiced by Vels.

In 1978, Liewe Heksie debuted in an Afrikaans language children's television programme directed by Louise Smit. A second series of began in 1981. Vels created 10 Liewe Heksie books, eight records and numerous videos, CDs, and DVDs.

== Characters ==
=== Main characters ===
- Liewe Heksie (The Little Witch): A clumsy, forgetful, and incompetent witch named Lavinia who lives in Blommeland.
- Blommie Kabouter (Blommie the Gnome): Heksie's best friend and a helpful companion.
- Karel Kat (Karel the Cat): An anthropomorphic, sophisticated cat from the city who owns a helicopter and drives a car.
- Matewis: Heksie's beloved pet kitten.
- Griet: A horse, whose name was chosen by Heksie because she couldn't think of other names.

=== Antagonists ===
- Geel Heks (Yellow Witch): An evil witch who tries to take over Blommeland.
- Gifappeltjies (Kerrie and Borrie): The Yellow Witch's menacing, yellow and orange-clad gnome minions.

=== Other characters ===
- Koning Rosekrans: The king who rules Blommeland and is often frustrated by Liewe Heksie but remains fond of her.
- Kwaaitjie Kabouter and Kwaai Babatjie: A bad-tempered gnome and his baby brother.
- Feëkoningin: The Fairy Queen, who also resides in Blommeland.

== Stories ==
=== Published books ===
The first two books were illustrated by Dorothy Hill, the third by Nikki Jones and the last two by Piet Grobler.

- Die Groot Liewe Heksie-storieboek, 1983 (The Big Liewe Heksie Storybook)
- Lekker Liewe Heksie Stories, 1983 (Nice Liewe Heksie Stories)
- Liewe Heksie en die Rugbywedstryd, 1988 (Liewe Heksie and the Rugby Tournament)
- Liewe Heksie en die Rekenaar, 1999 (Liewe Heksie and the Computer)
- Die Liewe Heksie Omnibus, 2002 (The Liewe Heksie Omnibus)
