= TPH Club =

- Created by: Antoni D'Ocón
- Written by: Joseph Viciana; Ramón Herrero
- Directed by: Anna Ribas
- Presented by: Paloma Lago
- Voices of: Mar Roca; Marta Covas; Rafael Turia; Carles Di Blasi
- Music by: Theo Paul Jaskolowskí; Guy Wenger
- Opening theme: "TPH Club Theme", performed by Leticia Sabater
- Country of origin: Spain

Production
- Production companies: RTVE; D'Ocon Films Productions; Televisión Española

Original release
- Network: La 1 La 2
- Release: 13 September 1999 – September 2003

TPH Club as known as Tú Puedes Hacerlo was a Spanish children's program aired on Televisión Española between 13 September 1999 and September 2003 and hosted by Paloma Lago. The program was created by Antoni D'Ocón, the creator of Sylvan, Delfy and His Friends, The Fruitties, and Scruff.

== Plot ==
This program is addressed to children aged between 4 and 11. It's also hosted by Paloma Lago. Her friends are four computer games' characters: 6UR4 - a female kangaroo from Australia, Supereñe - a funny superhero, M4R1A - a dizzy blond tennis player, and M4X - the boy from the future. Their leader PCTPH is a talking and flying monitor.

== Characters ==
- Paloma is a young hostess of the program. She shows the painting made by the fans and answers their questions.
- Gura (6UR4) is a smart female Australian kangaroo. She's the smartest team member. Her hobby is traveling. She is voiced by Mar Roca.
- Supereñe is a very funny and kind male superhero. He's the youngest team member. His hobby is the letter Ñ, flying and encyclopedia. He is voiced by Rafael Turia.
- Maria (M4R1A) is a female tennis player and Max's girlfriend. She's the bravest team member. Her hobby is music and sport. She is voiced by Marta Covas.
- Max (M4X) is a teenager from the future and Maria's boyfriend. He's an oldest team member. His hobby is PC and console games. He has an awful twin-brother – Commander Peligro. He is voiced by Carles Di Blasi.
- PCTPH is a flying and talking monitor. He is a four characters leader.
- Commander Peligro is Max's evil twin-brother and the main antagonist. Gura, Supereñe and Maria despise him.

== Intro ==
Intro is a sequence which opens the TV block. First, Gura appears on the background with some presents. Next, Supereñe is seen on the light blue background. Later, other animated characters are seen with two first characters walking from right to left. Later on the graphical background appears Maria which rounds around. Soon the all animated stars with three protagonists appear on the blue background. At the end the TPH Club logo appears on the white background.

== Logo ==
The TPH Club logo appears everywhere. This logo is two colored squares. First square is blue with green triangle and black V shape with T (on upper left), P (on upper right) and H (on bottom middle). Second square is red with yellow round and black half-moon shape with C. Under the squares there are the words: "TPH" in blue and "CLUB" in red.

== Series aired on the block ==
- Adventures from the Book of Virtues
- Alfred J. Kwak
- Around the World with Willy Fog
- Arthur
- The Bugs Bunny Show
- Delfy and His Friends
- Digimon Adventure
- Dogtanian and the Three Muskehounds
- Doraemon
- Fix & Foxi and Friends
- Inspector Gadget
- Mr. Bogus
- Mort and Phil
- Oggy and the Cockroaches
- Patrol 03
- Peanuts
- Rugrats
- Scruff
- Sesame Street
- Space Goofs
- Sylvan
- The Country Mouse and the City Mouse Adventures
- The Fruitties
- The Mozart Band
- The Neverending Story
- Tiny Toon Adventures
- The Triplets
- The World of David the Gnome
