= List of Scruff episodes =

List of episodes of a 2000 Catalan animated TV Series

Scruff is a 2000 Catalan animated TV series by D'Ocon Films. The series is based on a 1969 book by Josep Vallverdú. It depicts the life of a puppy, Scruff, who is adopted by a farmer named Peter. The show was directed by Antoni D'Ocón and distributed in English by BKN International. The animation is rendered using Toon Boom software, through a method of creating traditional 2D animated characters over a 3D computer-generated background. A total of 105 episodes of the series were released along with six movies.

== Episodes ==
=== Season 1 (2000–2002) ===
1. Wanted A Home
2. What Will We Do with This Dog
3. The Course of Three Dogs
4. Craving for Eggs
5. Christmas is Almost Here
6. Preying Around
7. A Circus Dog
8. The Circus Star
9. Fox Hunting
10. Bringing the Flock Home
11. A Canned Tail
12. The Runaway
13. Shackled by Fear
14. Staking Out Territory
15. Two Families For Just One Dog
16. The Hero Of Nevell
17. Scruff And Peter Ltd
18. That's Not For Playing With
19. Smells Like An Adventure
20. Princess Always On His Mind
21. Fugitives
22. Prizes Galore
23. All Because Of A Mushrooms Omlett
24. Going Up The Rock
25. Where's Miaow
26. It's Time To Say Good-Bye
27. Useless and Unnecessary
28. Too Much Sun
29. The Last Of His Kind
30. A Testing Time
31. Uncle Ron and Aunt lil
32. Peter the city mechanic
33. Early Retirement
34. Friends Face off
35. Princess is not Impressed
36. Invisible scruff
37. A Foxy Tale
38. Changing places
39. America
40. Books and Roses
41. Sweet and sour dreams
42. Kidnapping of The chestnuts seller
43. Some Very Generous Truits
44. Run Aways
45. Totally barking
46. I'm not me
47. Be yourself
48. Best friends
49. The richest Treasure
50. Spring Has sprung
51. Neither mine nors yours
52. A Saint's Day For Scruff
53. Where are you scruff
54. Fire
55. Sing What you like
56. April Fool
57. Honey Tongued
58. Moonstruck
59. The Floral Games of Navell
60. Saint Anthony's Day
61. The Devils
62. The Tree Festival
63. Good luck Bad luck
64. The Godfather
65. The First cherry
66. Fireside Stories

=== Season 2 (2002–2004) ===
1. Scruff, I'll Never Leave You
2. The Messenger Dog
3. The Rain Man
4. A Puppy Forever
5. Can't Cope
6. The Monument
7. Things Aren't Always What They Seem
8. The Law of Nature
9. Contradictius Muscarius
10. I'm Not Always Happy All the Time
11. Peter is Jealous
12. Count Scruffala
13. Buttons and Circus, Owners of Tolosa Farm
14. The Tramps
15. Theory of Practice
16. Buttons, My Love
17. The Joking Dog
18. ST, the Extraterrestrial Dog
19. The Dog Who Knew too Much
20. The Other Scruff
21. Dogs and Masters
22. The Date
23. A New Home For Strummer
24. Peter, a Free Man
25. A Bad Day
26. Family Ghosts
27. Insurance For Dogs
28. No to War
29. The Peter Show
30. The Road
31. Privacy
32. The Family Feud
33. Eclipsed
34. The Crazy Firecracker
35. The Case of the Hens That Laid Fried Eggs
36. Strummer Without His Guitar
37. If They Could Talk
38. Mutiny in the Series
39. Where is Everybody

== Films (2005–2007) ==
1. Scruff and the Legend of Saint George
2. Scruff in a Midsummer Night's Dream
3. Scruff: Cinderella's Carnival
4. Scruff's Halloween
5. Scruff: A Christmas Tale
6. Scruff: Christmas Without clause

== Notes ==
- The show often re-used footage (example, the rain storm scene from "The Course of Three Dogs" was used 3 more times.
- "A Circus Dog", and "The Circus Star" was a 2-part episode.
