= Neptuno Films =

Spanish animation studio

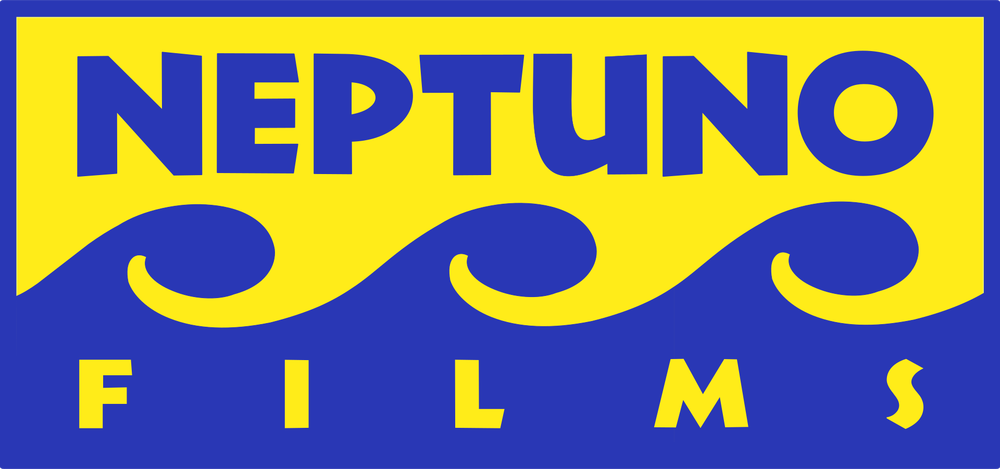
- Industry: Animation
- Founded: 1991; 35 years ago
- Founders: Josep Viciana
- Defunct: February 2017; 9 years ago
- Fate: Liquidated, dissolved
- Headquarters: Terrassa, Barcelona, Catalonia, Spain

Neptuno Films was a Spanish animation studio, headquartered in Terrassa, in the Barcelona province. Founded in 1991 by Josep Viciana, it produced animated series for Televisión Española (TVE) and TV3 and also collaborated with international producers.

In 2002 it was considered by Animation Magazine one of the 10 most important animation studios outside the U.S. and the second most prolific European studio, producing 100 half-hours of programming yearly.

== History ==
The production company was founded in 1991 by Josep Lluís Viciana, who had previously worked for D'Ocon Films in series such as Los Aurones and The Fruitties.

The new studio's first work was a series of animated shorts named Balín, seen on TVE and later on Club Super 3. This was followed by two animated series: Detective Bogey (1994–1996), based on an original idea by Viciana, and The Ugly Duckling (1997–1998), adapted from Hans Christian Andersen's story of the same name. Both aired on the children's programming blocks of La 1 and La 2.

From 2000, Neptuno started producing cartoons largely for autonomous networks, mainly for TV3. Its largest success was Connie the Cow (2003–2007), sold to over ten countries, although it also made other key works such as The Gravediggers Squad (2000), Bandolero (2002, produced for Canal Sur Televisión), Dougie in Disguise (2006–2008) and international co-productions such as Sea Princesses (2007), Megaminimals (2008) and Chuck Chicken (2015).

In 2001, it had six projects on the pipeline, but only three were presented at that year's MIPCOM.

In January 2004 the company signed a deal with Voom HD Networks for the carriage of two television series, 2020 and The Gravediggers Squad on its cartoon channel Animania HD.

On 28 September 2006, it launched El Gato Feliz, a channel exclusive to Orange España's IPTV offer, produced by Sociedad Digital de Autores y Editores (SDAE) and carrying Neptuno's portfolio in its schedule. In 2007, it signed an agreement with Singaporean company Character Farm to sell the CGI series KATAKUNE worldwide except for Asia and North America, the first time a Spain-Singapore deal was made between animation studios.

In February 2017, the company was put up under a liquidation process.

== Productions ==
Most information retrieved from Catalan Films and sorted in chronological order.

- Balin (1991)
- Detective Bogey (1994)
- The Ugly Duckling (1996)
- The Three Bears (2000)
- The Gravediggers Squad (2000)
- Bandolero (2002)
- 2020 (for Megatrix, 2002)
- Connie the Cow (2003)
- Aprendiendo con Connie (2004)
- Lapitch the Little Shoemaker (animation services)
- King Arthur's Disasters (2005)
- Tork (2006)
- Dougie in Disguise (2006)
- Pim & Pam (2006)
- The Gloops (2007)
- Sea Princesses (2007)
- Zoo Mix (2007)
- Megaminimals (2008)
- Poppets Town (2009)
- Chuck Chicken (2010, Malaysian series, Viciana wrote the scripts)
- Rupert & Sam (2011)
- The Story Isn't Over Yet! (2011)
- Tex (2015)
