= Vallverdú =

Vallverdú (Eastern Catalan: [ˌbaʎβəɾˈðu]) is a Catalan surname. Notable people with the surname include:

- Daniel Vallverdú (born 1986), Venezuelan tennis coach
- Josep Vallverdú (1923–2026), Spanish writer and poet
