= Josep Roig Boada =

Spanish musician

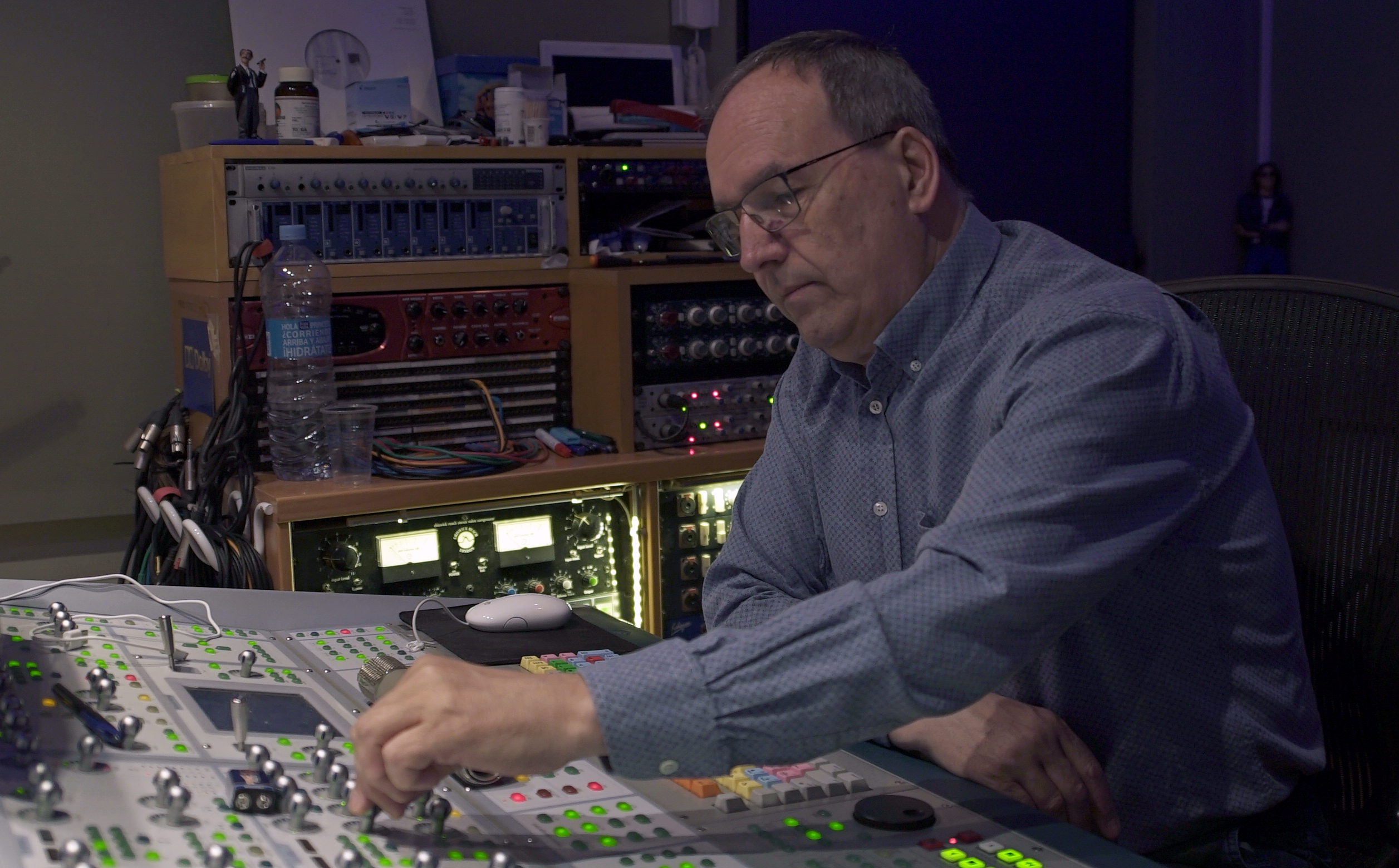
- Born: 6 August 1957 (age 68); Terrassa
- Occupations: Musician, composer, producer and sound engineer.

Josep Roig Boada (born 6 August 1957 in Terrassa, Spain) is a Spanish music composer, producer and sound engineer. He owns Temps Record company.

== Biography ==
=== Studies and professional career ===
During his early years, Roig studied Spanish guitar lessons with Emilio Gorrita, violin lessons with Josep Mª Alpiste, Alberto Licy and Josep Lluís Puig, harmony lessons with Pere Casas and Angel Soler and also attended a course of music language in cinema with José Nieto. Roig became a professional musician. He used to play the violin and the Spanish guitar in concerts of several singers, groups or orchestras.

In 1979, when he was 22, Roig started his career as a composer, creating the soundtrack for Vida de perros, a short film directed by Josep Lluís Viciana.

Since the beginning of his career, Roig has collaborated many times with audiovisual director Josep Lluís Viciana as a soundtrack composer in well-known series like "Connie the Cow", "The Ugly Duckling" or "The Fruitties".

Apart from the soundtracks, Roig has worked as a sound engineer and music producer in many music albums. His passion for music lead him to create Temps Record, a recording studio and record label located in Terrassa, Spain.

=== Featured work and awards ===
Roig has worked in more than 300 music productions as a sound engineer, music producer and composer. One of these produccions, Lídia Pujol's "Els amants de Lilith", was considered one of the 20 best music releases of 2008 by Womex.

As for soundtracks, Roig has mostly worked for Spanish production companies, but has also participated in projects originated in Norway, Australia, Malaysia and Canada, among others. "The Ugly Duckling", produced by Neptuno Films in 1997, was the first occidental animated series broadcast in China. Also, "Connie the Cow", produced by the same company in 2000 and exported to USA and Canada, was one of the most awarded series at the 2000 Cannes Film Festiva. Sauthern Star, an Australian company employed Boada in 2005 and 2008, for the creation of the soundtrack of animated series Sea Princesses and Classic Tales, respectively.

== Discography as sound engineer ==
Artist	Album title
A tota vela (Pauli Peña)	Perquè ets tu ^{[+]}
Aire	Lleno de flores
Alba Ventura	Rachmanimoff
Amadeu Casas	Strollin Bano
Anton Abad	A la corda fluixa
Anton Serra & Ayako Fujiki	Anton Serra – Schurbert
Atomic Leopards	Model ^{[+]}
Ayako Fujiki	Goyescas
Aymi & Traver	Aymi & Traver
OABCN Orquestra Àrab de BaRNA	Bàraka
Barcelona Jazz Orquestra & Jon Faddis	Dizzy's Business ^{[+]}
Barcelona Percussion Project	Barcelona Percussion Project
Ben Roig	Fi d'una segona dècada... ^{[+]}
BJO	BJO i N. Payton ^{[+]}
BJO	Nits de Swing ^{[+]}
Brossa Quartet	Músiques de l'Holocaust
Bruno Oro & Vicens Martín	Sinatra 100 anys
Burull & Farràs Quintet	Burrull & Farràs Quartet ^{[+]}
Cadira	Mar
Coral de Gràcia	Remembering Lowis
Dani Alonso	Cor gospel Barcelona
Dani Alonso	Think Pink
Dani Alonso	Shakin' All
Dani Alonso i Erwyn Seerutton	The Streets of New Orleans
Domini Màgic	Visions i cants
Domini Màgic	On
Dunedein	Dime
Eduard Iniesta	Andròmines
Eduard Iniesta	Secrets Guardats
Eduard Iniesta	Nítid
Eduard Iniesta	Els set pecats
Emmanuel Djob	The Miracle of Life ^{[+]}
Emmanuel Djob	Remember*
Enric Carreras	Negre fosc
Enric Carreras	L'enigma de Shibam
Erwyn Seerutton	Erwin Segà 4. No mèmsa ^{[+]}
Gemma Abrie	A Tribute to Ella Fitzgerald
Gemma Abrie	Wondering
Gemma Abrie	Amalgama
Gemma Vicens Band	Nobody Wins
Hosanna	Tiempo de Navidad
Hosanna	Otro lugar
Hosanna	Creo en ti
Jazzspirit i Josep Mª Farràs	Camí ^{[+]}
Joan Amèric	Direcament
Joan Amèric	Perquè sóc de poble
Joan Chamorro	Joan Chamorro & Andrea Motis
Joan Chamorro	Joan Chamorro & Eva Fernández
Joan Chamorro	Joan Chamorro & Magalí Datzira
Joan Chamorro & Andrea Motis	Feeling Good
Jordi Garriga	Nits de fred
Josep Soto	Groc ^{[+]}
Josep Tero	D'un mateix mar
Josep Tero	Fronteres
Josep Tero	Kavafis en concert
Kat Santana	One More Sound
Kesia	Qué mas da ^{[+]}
Kesia	No me beses ^{[+]}
Kesia	Lágrimas de sal
Lídia Pujol	Els amants de Lilith ^{[+]}
Lídia Pujol	Begging the Waves ^{[+]}
Llorer	Selecció natural
Los Sirgadors	La terra ensomiada ^{[+]}
Luna Cohen	Entrada do sol ^{[+]}
Luna Cohen	Flor Do Cerrado
Luna Cohen	November Sky
Luna Cohen & Jurandir Santana	Començo do caminhar
Maria Betriu	Maria Betriu
Maria Betriu	Maria Betriu canta jazz català
Maria Betriu	Speak Low
Marina Tuset	Sweet Lights
Marina Tuset	Blue Nites
Ministrils del Raval	Bona casa i bona brasa, bona...
Ministrils del Raval	Festa major de Terrassa
Miquel Gil	Eixos
Miquel Gil	Per Marcianes
Mónica Guech	Soulove ^{[+]}
Mónica Guech	La tua memoria
Mónica Guech	Memòria ^{[+]}
Mónica Guech	Oroipenak
Mónica Guech	Humanitat
Mónica Guech	Corazón con alas
Muñoz Coca & Santi Pivon	Concierto Aranjuez ^{[+]}
Muñoz Coca & Santi Pivon	2 Guitarras ^{[+]}
Natan	Sigo esperándote
Orquestra de Percussió Ibèrica	Coetus
Pauli Peña	Tamarauga
Pauli Peña	La cúmbia és per a tu
Pauli Peña	Oasis
Pauli Peña	Història Palau Plegamans
Pauli Peña	Entre atmósferas
Pere Soto & Josep Traver	Still Here
Phil Woods & Barcelona Jazz Orquestra	Our Man Benny ^{[+]}
Quebrante	Quebrante
Quico Pi de la Serra	Dues tasses
Quico Pi de la Serra	QuicoLabora
Rosa Zaragoza	Terra de Jueus
Sangre de Mayo	El recuerdo de su mirada ^{[+]}
Sant Andreu Jazz Band	Jazzing (vol, 2)
Sant Andreu Jazz Band	Jazzing (vol. 3)
Sant Andreu Jazz Band	Jazzing 4 (vol. 1)
Sant Andreu Jazz Band	Jazzing 4 (vol. 2)
Sant Andreu Jazz Band	Jazzing 6 (vol. 1)
Sant Andreu Jazz Band	Jazzing 6 (vol. 2)
Sant Andreu Jazz Band	Sant Andreu Jazz Band
Sergio Vellido	Amar sin más
Sergio Vellido	De tus ojos a mis ojos
Sergio Vellido	De tus ojos a mis ojos (vol. 2)
Sierra Nevada	La mort du cygne
Tal Ben Ari & Asikides	Hesperia
The Invisiblemens	The Invisiblemens
The Perfect Fool	The Perfect Fool
The Perfect Fool	Footprints
The Perfect Fool	Simply Therapeutic
The Perfect Fool	Segrest d'idees
Trikitown	Tevadafalú
Utropic	Utropic
Victor Blanca i les claus de Jade	Paraules d'aigua
Victor Mirallas	Protocolo
Victor Mirallas	Todos fuimos
Xalupa	Un sordo s'ho escoltava
Xavier Soranells	eXeSs

Note: ^{[+]} means Roig worked also as Artistic Producer.

== Filmography ==
Roig has created the soundtrack for many audiovisual products.

=== Productions with D'Ocon Films ===
Year	Title	Description	Contribution	Notes	Director
1980	El món màgic del màgic Bruffi: El rei i el carboner	TV series	Pilot	Coproduction with TV3 (Catalan TV)	Josep Viciana
1984	El món màgic del màgic Bruffi	TV series	26 episodes	Coproduction with TV3 (Catalan TV)	Josep Viciana
1986	The Picks	TV series	Pilot		Josep Viciana
1987	Los Aurones	TV series	52 episodes	Coproduction with TVE	Josep Viciana
1987	La tribu de los aurones	Film in 35mm	Film soundtrack		Josep Viciana
1990	Els Fruittis	TV series	78 episodes	Coproduction with TVE & TF1	Josep Viciana
1992	Delfy	TV series	78 episodes	Coproduction with TVE	Josep Viciana
1995	The Pocket Dragons	TV series	Pilot	Coproduction with Universal – USA	Josep Viciana
1996	The Herluf's	TV series	52 episodes	Coproduction with Norway TV	Josep Viciana
1996	Las Brujitas	TV series		Coproduction with TVE	Josep Viciana
1997	Problem Bert	TV series	Signature tone	Coproduction with Universal – USA	Josep Viciana

=== Productions with Neptuno films ===
Year	Title	Description	Contribution	Notes	Director
1993	Detective Bogey	TV series	Pilot	Josep Viciana	Exported to Canada and Germany.
1993	Pikototis	TV series	Pilot	Josep Viciana	
1993	Neptuno Films	Band signature tone		Josep Viciana	
1994	Balin	TV series	300 episodes	Josep Viciana	
1994	Los tornillos	TV series	Pilot	Josep Viciana	
1997	El patito feo	TV series	104 episodes	Josep Viciana	
1997	El capitán Nemo	TV series	Pilot	Josep Viciana	
1997	Los tres ositos	TV series	Pilot	Josep Viciana	
1999	Los tres ositos	TV movie	Movie soundtrack	Josep Viciana	
1999	Los tres ositos	TV series	52 episodes	Josep Viciana	
1999	Los sepultureros	TV series	52 episodes	Josep Viciana	
1999	Gomis	TV series	Trailer	Josep Viciana	
2000	El patito feo	TV movie	Movie soundtrack	Josep Viciana	
2000	Bandolero	TV series	Trailer + 52 episodes	Josep Viciana	Coproduction with Canal Sur.
2000	Connie the Cow	TV series	52 episodes	Josep Viciana	Exported to Canada and USA.
2000	Dog & Toot	TV series	Trailer	Josep Viciana	
2002	2020	TV series	26 episodes	Josep Viciana	
2003	Dogey	TV series	52 episodes	Josep Viciana	
2004	Trik	TV series	52 episodes	Josep Viciana	
2005	Sea Princesses	TV series	104 episodes	Josep Viciana	Coproduction with Sauthern Star (Australia)
2006	Glops	TV series	52 episodes	Josep Viciana	
2007	Megaminimals	TV series	104 episodes	Josep Viciana	
2008	Classic Tales	TV series	104 episodes	Josep Viciana	Coproduction with Sauthern Star (Australia)
2015	Tex	TV series	52 episodes	Josep Viciana	Coproduction with TVE (Spain)
2017	Aquest conte encara no s'ha acabat	TV series	26 episodes	Josep Viciana	

=== Other ===
Year	Title	Description	Contribution	Production company	Director
1979	Vida de perros	Short-film in 35mm	Soundtrack	Independent	Josep Viciana
1980	El món màgic del màgic Bruffi: El rei i el carboner	TV series	Pilot	TV3	Josep Viciana
1984	El món màgic del màgic Bruffi	TV series	26 episodes	TV3	Josep Viciana
1984	Oliana Molls	TV series	27 episodes	TV3	Joan Guitart
1985	L'ofici d'aprendre	TV series		Producción Vídeo y Comunicación S.A. and TV3	
1985	Lorgan	TV series	Pilot	Producción Vídeo y Comunicación S.A.	Josep Viciana
1986	Derkofilms	Brand signature tone		Derkofilms	Josep Viciana
1987	Feliz cumpleaños	Short-film in 35mm.	Soundtrack	Independent	Jesús Font
1990	La coneja	TV series	26 episodes	TVE	Hugo Estuvens
1991	El zoo del zodiaco	TV series	Pilot	TV3	
1994	No em fumis	Short-film in 35mm.	Soundtrack	Independent	Eduard Cazorla
1995	Estereoscopia	3D Audiovisual	Soundtrack	Independent	J. Martínez Barea
1997	Las Piquetas de los Gallos	Short-film in 35mm.	Soundtrack	Fòrum-Art	José Gutiérrez Gayoso
1997	Matrícula d'humor	Play	Soundtrack	Pocaconya	Jordi Porti (Script by Eduard Biosca)
1998	Iris	Short-film in 35mm.	Soundtrack	Independent	Victor
1999	Terrassa, la ciutat de les persones	Spot in 35mm	Soundtrack	Council of Terrassa	
1999	Yepeto	Play	Soundtrack	Món del Teatre i Punts Cardinals	Luciano Brassi i Marc de La Torre
2000	Noise	Short-film in 35mm.	Soundtrack	Independent	Francesc Serrat
