= Delfy and His Friends =

1992 animated television series

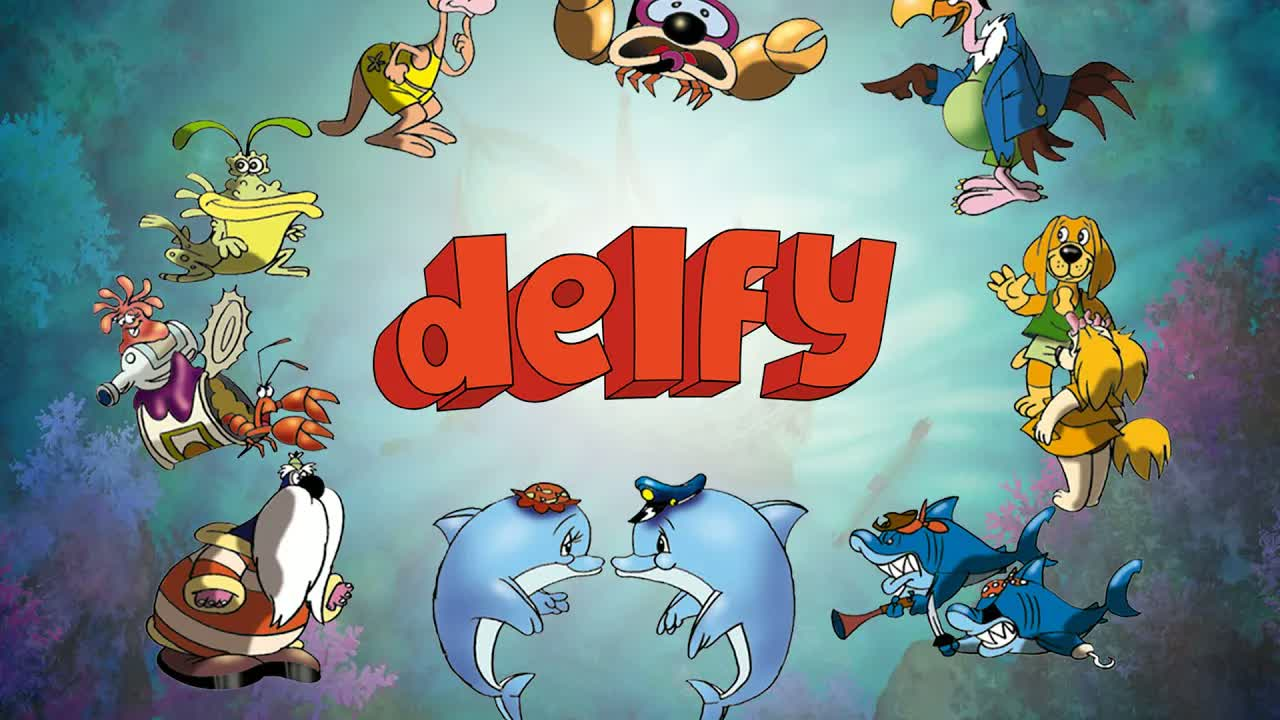
- Spanish: Delfy y sus amigos
- Created by: Antoni D'Ocón
- Written by: Josep Viciana; Ramón Herrero; Josep Peña
- Directed by: Antoni D'Ocón
- Composer: Josep Roig Boada
- Countries of origin: Spain; Italy; France
- Original language: Spanish
- No. of episodes: 91

Production
- Running time: 23 minutes
- Production companies: D'Ocon Films; Televisión Española; RAI; TF1

Original release
- Network: TVE1
- Release: 18 April – 21 November 1992

Delfy and His Friends (Spanish: Delfy y sus amigos) is an animated children's television series produced by D'Ocon Films, in co-production with Televisión Española (TVE), Radiotelevisione italiana (RAI) and TF1. Its 91 episodes were first aired on TVE1.

== Synopsis ==
English-language intro.

The series focuses on the underwater adventures of Delfy the Dolphin and his friends. In every episode, they are compelled to defend their habitat from the schemes of a greedy vulture, his kangaroo assistant and a pair of sharks.

== Characters ==
=== Protagonists ===
- Delfy - a young blue dolphin with a captain hat. He serves as the titular main protagonist of the series.
- Chees - a female dolphin with a beach hat who's Delfy's girlfriend.
- Fasty - a Hermit crab who's often carried with a cat food can replacing his shell.
- Rudy - a crab dressed like a snorkeler.
- Baby Whale - an infant whale who's always in danger from the antagonists, but most of the time, is freed from them by either Delfy and his friends or his father.
- Froggy - Delfy's best friend who's a green monkfish in the original version. Strangely, in some other versions (including the English version), he claims he is a frog due to his design, which seems to resemble a frog more than what a monkfish looks like.
- The Hammerhead Shark - a hammerhead shark who's the only shark considered gentle and friendly.
- The Swordfish - a swordfish.
- The Octopus - a gray octopus.
- Police Agent - a blue fish police officer who travels on his seahorse's back.
- The Turtle - a green sea turtle who, despite being a sea turtle, looks more like a tortoise (another type of turtle) due to his limbs.
- Dan - an elderly purple walrus with a large mustache as opposed to a walrus' tusks and a green propeller cap who's Delfy's friend who always stays on land. He works in a lighthouse.
- Mick - a friendly puppy who wears a green shirt and light-green swimming shorts.
- Gigi - a female puppy who wears orange and is Mick's best friend.

=== Antagonists ===
- Captain Vinager - a greedy pirate vulture who's Delfy's worst enemy and the main antagonist of the series. He wears a captain hat like Delfy, a blue vest and a green shirt. He always attacks the aquatic animals, but most of the time, his plans always fail.
- Boing - a dim-witted kangaroo with a yellow swimsuit and a sailor hat who's Vinager's assistant.
- Sharky - a mean pirate shark who wears a red bandana with white spots, an eyepatch and a hook.
- Sharko - another pirate shark who's Sharky's companion. Unlike Sharky, he's less intelligent and his attire includes a brown pirate hat with a red bandana below.
