= Bandolero (TV series) =

- Genre: Animated series Comedy; Adventure; Romance
- Written by: Joaquín Cera; Juan Carlos Ramis; Xavi B.Fernández; Josep Viciana
- Directed by: Josep Viciana
- Creative director: Josep Viciana
- Theme music composer: Josep Roing
- Country of origin: Spain
- Original language: Spanish
- No. of seasons: 2
- No. of episodes: 52

Production
- Executive producer: Cristina Brandner
- Running time: 25 minutes
- Production companies: Neptuno Films; Canal Sur Televisión

Original release
- Release: 28 February – 9 May 2002

Bandolero is a Spanish animated series broadcast by Canal Sur's Canal 2, co-procuced by Neptuno Films. It debuted in 18 February 2002, Andalusia Day, as part of the children's program La Banda. It is presumed to be the first animated series that was dubbed entirely with voices in an Andalusian accent.

== History ==
The story is set in rural Córdoba in the 19th century, just after the Spanish War of Independence. Cosme Jiménez is a fair and generous landowner who dies in a fire started by Captain Rodrigo. However, two people manage to escape the flames: Juan, Don Cosme's ten-year-old son, and Cándido Álvarez, the boy's tutor.

For ten years, the two hid in the forest, where Don Cándido not only educated his pupil as a teacher, but also taught him to fight, hoping that one day he would achieve justice.

As an adult, Juan publicly reveals himself as "Bandolero," a hero who fights for the people against the abuses and injustices of the rich and powerful, especially Roberto Campomayor, the new governor of the region, who has Captain Rodrigo himself under his command. Bandolero will have the support of his gang, made up of Tragabuche, Toni, Rosita, and the dog Flaco, with whom he will experience numerous adventures throughout the series.

== Characters/Voice actors ==
- Juan Jiménez/Bandolero y Cosme Jiménez (Jorge García Tomé)
- Toni (David Arnaiz)
- Tragabuche (Alberto Hidalgo)
- Rosita (Nonia Tejero de la Gala)
- Cándido Álvarez (Javier Merchante)
- Gobernador Roberto Campomayor (Antonio Inchausti)
- Capitán Rodrigo (Jesús Prieto)
- María (Lola Álvarez)
- Dolores (Mariló Seco)
- Sargento Jeremías (Rafa Torres)
- Cabo Fasto (Chema del Barco)
- Cabo Nefasto (Manolo Solo)
- Flaco (Alejando Albaiceta)

== Spin-offs ==
In 2020 eight students of the IES Profesor Tierno Galván technical school in Alcalá de Guadaíra formed Octavilla Games and made "Tragabuche: Er Videojuego", a videogame starring the character Tragabuche , Bandolero's sidekick. It was released at Google's Play Store and was in the top 5 of most downloaded apps in its first week, with 8000 downloads
