= Josep Viciana =

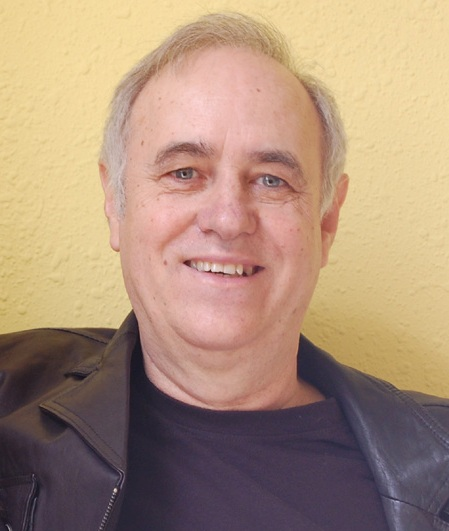
- Born: Josep Lluís Viciana i Monfort; 1951 July 2 Terrassa, Catalonia, Spain
- Occupation: Animator

Josep Lluís Viciana i Monfort (born in Terrassa in 1951 July 2) is a Catalan animator.

== Biography ==
Josep Viciana is the grandson of José Monfort Gil, who suffered from political repression in the early 1940s, dying from shots on 29 May 1941, a few meters away from the Castelló Cemetery.

In the 1980s, he worked with Antoni D'Ocón as a scriptwriter for his animation studio, then in 1991, Viciana became one of the founders of Neptuno Films, an animation studio based in his birth town of Terrassa (Barcelona metropolitan area) which quickly became important in the Spanish animation industry. His first standalone series, Balin, a series of 20-second animated shorts with no dialogue, aired in 1992. From Neptuno Films, with Viciana as a director of animated series and also creator, a number of well-known products such as Megaminimals was created, exported to different countries such as the United States, China and Kenya, thanks to interest from broadcasters at MIPCOM in Cannes.

Neptuno Films was classified as the second most prosperous European animation studio according to the CARTOON (European Animation Association) study The Global Animation Business. Additionally, Viciana's production company was elected as one of the ten best animation studios outside of the United States, according to Animation Magazine.

The Ugly Duckling was sold to China Central Television in 1997, becoming one of the first Western animated series introduced in that market. When the Castilian premiere of the series was scheduled for April 1998, Viciana's company sold the rights to 60 countries. On the other hand, Connie the Cow was exported to countries such as the United States and Canada and became one of the most awarded series at the 2000 Cannes Film Festival. Later, he won a Cartoons on the Bay award in 2005 and a Zapping Award in 2006. Detective Bogey won the award of the best Latin American series. By the time Megaminimals was already airing on Catalan television, it already received interest from seven broadcasters in China. He also held a longtime collaboration with Josep Roig Boada as far back as the mid-80s, when he still worked at D'Ocón Films, and after Neptuno Films was dissolved.

In the 2010s, Josep entered into contact with Grup per la Recerca de la Memòria Històrica de Castelló to find the whereabouts of the body of his deceased grandfather. In 2023, he announced his intent to produce a crowdfunded short film, El viatge d'en Lindo, based on Viciana's mother's dog (named Lindo) and his experience in 1936, when the Spanish Civil War began.
