= Problem Child (TV series) =

1993 American animated children's program

- Genre: Comedy
- Based on: Problem Child by Scott Alexander; Larry Karaszewski
- Developed by: Scott Alexander; Larry Karaszewski
- Directed by: Antoni D'Ocón (season 1); Lee Williams (season 2)
- Starring: Gilbert Gottfried as the voice of Igor Peabody
- Voices of: Nancy Cartwright; E.G. Daily; Ben Diskin; Jonathan Harris; John Kassir; Mark Taylor; Cree Summer (season 2)
- Composers: William Anderson (season 1); Edmund Eagan (season 2)
- Countries of origin: United States; Spain (season 1); Canada (season 2)
- Original language: English
- No. of seasons: 2
- No. of episodes: 26 (list of episodes)

Production
- Executive producers: Robert Simonds; Scott Alexander; Larry Karaszewski; Sheldon Wiseman (season 2)
- Producers: Arthur Leonardi (season 1); Kathi Castillo (season 2); Weldon Poapst (season 2)
- Running time: 21 minutes
- Production companies: D'Ocon Films Productions (season 1); Lacewood Productions (season 2); Universal Cartoon Studios

Original release
- Network: USA Network
- Release: October 31, 1993 – December 4, 1994

Problem Child is an animated television series co-produced by Universal Cartoon Studios, D'Ocon Films Productions for season 1 and Lacewood Productions for season 2, and based on the Problem Child films. The series was first premiered on USA Network (part of the USA Cartoon Express block) in October 31, 1993 until the final episode's airing in December 4, 1994. A significant feature has Gilbert Gottfried reprising his role of Igor Peabody from the films; this makes him the only actor in every film in the series and the cartoon.

== Synopsis ==
10-year-old Junior continues his not-so-evil and not-so-horrid adventures with his adoptive father Little Ben Healy (who is now a sheriff) and his new friend Cyndi in Toe Valley. Junior continues to make life miserable for uncaring people who get in his way like his principal Igor Peabody and Junior's grandfather Big Ben Healy with pranks and mischievous ideas.

== Characters ==
=== Main characters ===
- Junior Healy (voiced by Ben Diskin) – The main protagonist and a mischievous young boy who causes retributive trouble against the uncaring adults that get in his way.
- "Little" Ben Healy (voiced by Mark Taylor) – Junior's kindhearted adoptive father and the sheriff of Toe Valley.
- Yoji (vocal effects provided by John Kassir) - A large rat who is Junior's pet. He often assists Junior in his shenanigans.
- Big Ben Healy (voiced by Jonathan Harris) – One of the main antagonists of the series. Big Ben Healy is Ben's father and Junior's adoptive grandfather who is the crooked mayor of Toe Valley.
- Igor Peabody (voiced by Gilbert Gottfried) – One of the main antagonists. Mr. Peabody is the principal of the local elementary school, and one of Junior's main rivals.
- Murph (voiced by John Kassir) – One of Junior's classmates. He is a former bully turned accomplice.
- Cyndi Kerrigan (voiced by E. G. Daily) – One of Junior's classmates and kinder best friend, Cyndi is a pretty, popular girl whose name is a reference to figure skater Nancy Kerrigan.
- Spencer (voiced by Cree Summer) - One of Junior's classmates who debuts during season two.

== Television airing and home media ==
USA Network aired the series as part of their USA Cartoon Express programming block. In the mid-to-late 2000s, Spanish-speaking TeleFutura (now UniMas) aired reruns of the series.

Four tapes (containing two episodes each) were released in 1995 containing episodes from seasons 1 and 2. The series was streaming on Tubi but has since been removed.

== Episodes ==
=== Season 1 (1993–94) ===
No. overall	No. in season	Title	Original release date
1	1	"Toys Will Be Toys"	October 31, 1993
Junior wants the Li'l Trooper Missile so badly that he earns money to buy one himself and takes revenge on the manufacturer when it does not work.
2	2	"Junior and the Grammy Bombs"	November 7, 1993
Principal Peabody forces the kids of Toe Valley Elementary School to sell Grammy Bombs for a chance to get a new swimming pool for the school and a free day off.
3	3	"Junior and the Jail Break"	November 14, 1993
Ben takes Junior to see Dr. Mel Practice and Nurse Karloff while having Yoji see the veterinarian at the time when Big Ben wants Ben to make some arrests while using two criminals from another town named Kirby and Zappy who are on work release. When Junior escapes from Dr. Practice, he returns to the Sheriff Department to find Ben tied up by Kirby and Zappy. They take Junior with them as Ben enlists Yoji to help find Junior as Dr. Practice and Nurse Karloff are also in pursuit.
4	4	"Junior and the Babysitter"	November 21, 1993
Junior is excited to go on a trip to Atlantic City, but finds out he cannot go as he plans to have a party, but his plan is ruined after he is stuck with a babysitter as Junior tries to find a way to get rid of her to have his party.
5	5	"Junior and the Z Guys"	November 28, 1993
Junior fights back when media watchdog groups declare that his favorite TV show is inappropriate for children.
6	6	"Junior and the Dictator"	December 5, 1993
In order to evade trouble, Junior is sent on a field trip to Faragua where its dictator General Pierre Habib-Johnson is visiting Toe Valley. While in Faragua, Junior gets the child laborers in a revolt of the government by posing as General Pierre Habib-Johnson.
7	7	"Junior's Doomsday Debacle"	December 12, 1993
8	8	"Junior and the Clown"	December 19, 1993
Junior is being stalked by a creepy clown.
9	9	"Junior and the Bathroom Door"	December 26, 1993
Junior is trapped in the bathroom after locking himself in after not wanting to go to an annual barbecue since Big Ben is there since they always get back at each other. Then Big Ben comes and he is trapped with Junior. In the end, Junior finds a way out, but Big Ben is still trapped in the bathroom.
10	10	"Junior Dies Hard"	January 2, 1994
Peabody plans to get Junior back as he threatens to blackmail Junior and get his friends into trouble and make them suffer. As Junior agrees to obey Peabody as Junior is accused of putting glue on Peabody's chair as he claims he didn't do it, Peabody makes every student stay in the auditorium and watch a boring movie. As it seems it was Peabody's secretary whom mistaken it for wax. Junior then makes a deal with Peabody to apologize to Junior and the students, but Junior tricks him and Peabody falls off the stage and removing him from the chair.
11	11	"Junior and the Camp"	January 9, 1994
12	12	"Governing Principal"	January 23, 1994
Junior runs for mayor after his comments on why kids have it harder than adults become popular.
13	13	"Junior and the Science Fair"	February 13, 1994
Principal Peabody steals Junior and Cindy's idea for an invention that helps kids clean their rooms.

=== Season 2 (1994) ===
No. overall	No. in season	Title	Original release date
14	1	"Junior Healy, Superstar"	September 12, 1994
Junior, Cyndi, Murph, Betsy, Ross, and Spencer get scammed by a Hollywood producer named Tommy Worthmore who was hired by Big Ben Healy to dupe the parents into thinking their child will be the next big movie star.
15	2	"My Fair Cyndi"	September 19, 1994
Junior helps Cyndi become a problem child, but the transformation turns her into a bully. Meanwhile, Principal Peabody uses hypnotism to brainwash people and has his sights set on Junior.
16	3	"The Wilderness Healys"	September 26, 1994
Junior and Little Ben Healy go on a father/son camping trip, but it soon becomes a grandfather/father/son trip after Big Ben Healy runs away to escape people who want a refund from him ranging from an old lady whose vacation condo was condemned, a shaved head man stating that the encyclopedia he received were in Russian, and an aspiring farmer who received swampland instead of a farmland. The Healy family endures the shenanigans of the camping trip that involves a run in with three hillbillies.
17	4	"The Weird Olympics"	October 2, 1994
Toe Valley competes in the Weird Olympics, but Big Bob Healy and Principal Peabody are forced by an out of town gangster named Mr. Big and his mob enforcer Louie to fix the games so Toe Valley loses and enable both Big Bob and Peabody to get rich. When Junior learns of this, he becomes an obstacle for Big Bob, Peabody, Mr. Big, and Louie.
18	5	"Sawdust, Tinsel, and Junior"	October 9, 1994
Junior runs away and joins the visiting Flying Seagull Traveling Circus when he is tired of Little Ben's rules and after once of his recent pranks on Big Ben Healy. He gets caught by the ringmaster who puts him to work as Junior befriends the ringmaster's daughter Wanda. Discovering that Junior is at the circus, Big Ben cuts a deal to have the ringmaster keep Junior there in exchange that the circus continues to perform in Toe Valley.
19	6	"Junior Meets Tiny Ben"	October 16, 1994
Junior meets a kid even more destructive than him: his younger cousin.
20	7	"Junior and the Big Kids"	October 23, 1994
Junior tries to get in good with a group of sixth grade boys.
21	8	"The Legend of Big Bob Healy"	October 30, 1994
While on a trip to Fort Healy, Junior and Cyndi discover an old storeroom that holds evidence that one of Junior's ancestors cheated the Native Americans out of their land.
22	9	"Junior and the Big House"	November 6, 1994
Junior finds himself in prison after police mistake him for Small Paul, a convict who had escaped.
23	10	"Teacher of the Year"	November 13, 1994
Ms. Hill, Junior's second grade teacher, gets fired by Mr. Peabody and gets a job at a construction site. But when Peabody's secretary Miss Brook announces that Ms. Hill has won Teacher of the Year, the kids must find a way to get Ms. Hill back to her old job to accept the award.
24	11	"Junior Vanilli"	November 20, 1994
Big Bob Healy and a music producer trick Junior and the kids into starting their own band.
25	12	"The Cyndi Kerrigan Story"	November 27, 1994
On the day of a big ice-skating competition, Cyndi misses out when someone locks her in a closet and Junior plays detective to find the culprit.
26	13	"Grease My Palm"	December 4, 1994
The kids put on a telethon to save the school when Peabody tries to embezzle the school's funds.

== Credits ==
=== Cast ===
- Ben Diskin as Junior Healy
- Gilbert Gottfried as Igor Peabody
- Nancy Cartwright as Betsy, Ross
- E.G. Daily as Cyndi Kerrigan
- Jonathan Harris as Big Ben Healy
- John Kassir as Murph, Yoji
- Cree Summer as Spencer, Additional voices (Season 1)
- Mark Taylor as Ben Healy

=== Additional voices ===
- Charles Adler (Season 1)
- John Astin as General Pierre Habib-Johnson (in "Junior and the Dictator"), Ringmaster (in "Sawdust, Tinsel, and Junior")
- Michael Bell (Season 1)
- Gregg Berger (Season 1)
- Sheryl Bernstein (Season 2)
- Earl Boen (Season 2)
- Becky Bonar (Season 2)
- S. Scott Bullock
- Rodger Bumpass (Season 1)
- Corey Burton (Season 1)
- Joey Camen (Season 2)
- Victoria Carroll (Season 1)
- Dan Castellaneta as Zappy (in "Junior and the Jail Break")
- Marsha Clark (Season 1)
- Brian Cummings (Season 2)
- Jim Cummings
- Debi Derryberry
- Denny Dillon (Season 1)
- Dave Fennoy (Season 2)
- Pat Fraley
- Brad Garrett (Season 2)
- Linda Gary (Season 1)
- Benny Grant (Season 2)
- Jess Harnell as Hillbilly #1 (in "The Wilderness Healys"), Shaved Head Man (in "The Wilderness Healys")
- Billie Hayes as Old Lady (in "The Wilderness Healys")
- Dana Hill
- Michael Horse (Season 2)
- Tino Insana (Season 2)
- Maurice LaMarche as Mr. Big (in "Weird Olympics"), Louie (in "Weird Olympics")
- Katie Leigh (Season 1)
- Sherry Lynn (Season 2)
- Danny Mann
- Edie McClurg
- Candi Milo (Season 2)
- Iona Morris
- Laraine Newman
- Valery Pappas (Season 2)
- Hal Rayle (Season 1)
- Bob Ridgely (Season 1)
- Pamela Segall as Jackson (in "Junior and the Big Kids")
- B.J. Ward (Season 1)
- April Winchell

=== Crew ===
- Ginny McSwain - Voice Director
