= Scruff (TV series) =

Animated television series

- Scruff as shown in the episode “A Circus Dog”
- Also known as: Rovelló
- Genre: Children's animation
- Created by: Josep Vallverdú
- Directed by: Antoni D'Ocón
- Voices of: Audíoprojetas-Galletly, Barcelona
- Opening theme: "Hey, I'm Scruff"
- Ending theme: "Happiness is a Smile Away"
- Composers: Theo Jaskolowskí, Guy Wenger
- Country of origin: Spain
- Original language: Catalan
- No. of seasons: 2
- No. of episodes: 105 (list of episodes)

Production
- Production locations: Studío La Galera, Barcelona
- Cinematography: Davíd Alcarría, Victor Maldonado
- Editor: Xavier Blanch (La Galera)
- Running time: 30 minutes
- Production companies: D'Ocon Films Productions; La Galera

Original release
- Network: Televisió de Catalunya; RTVE
- Release: 1 November 2000 – 29 October 2004

Scruff is a 2000 Catalan animated TV series by D'Ocon Films and La Galera based on a 1969 book by Josep Vallverdú. It depicts the life of a puppy, Scruff, who is adopted by a farmer named Peter. The show was directed by Antoni D'Ocón and distributed in English by BKN International. The animation is rendered using Toon Boom software, through a method of creating traditional 2D animated characters over a 3D computer-generated background.

The series had 105 episodes and was reprised in 6 feature films, including 2 Christmas specials.

== Premise ==
=== Setting ===
Following the loss of a tourist family's puppy, a long forest search ensues. The puppy is eventually located and adopted by a young country worker named Peter, who takes the puppy to his aunt and uncle's farmhouse. Peter then names the puppy Scruff. As Peter and his relatives spend time with Scruff, they discover his skills, including acrobatics and the ability to sniff out various forest fruits.

Scruff lives amidst livestock, poultry, and two other dogs named Sanda and Tricks, who become his family over time. Each episode features a new adventure for Scruff. He learns about the farm from the animals and pets, and about the forest from the wild animals. In the village, he meets human beings.

=== Characters and cast ===
- Scruff – A young pup with boundless curiosity. His inquisitive nature sometimes gets him into a lot of trouble. He is a pointer mix puppy from a foreign land and is not good at tracking or guarding. However, he has unique skills such as acrobatics and sniffing out forest fruits.
- Strummer – A flea who lives on Scruff, often providing him with advice. He plays the guitar and once lived on a circus dog. Scruff normally gets annoyed with him and abandons the parasite.
- Peter – Scruff's owner, who shares a lot of personality points with his pet and dreams of being in a circus.
- Uncle Ron and Aunt Lil – Peter's aunt and uncle, the owners of Tolosa Farm. They are a standard farm couple.
- Sanda – The most mature dog on the farm, she serves as the watchdog and tracker for the owners. When Scruff arrives on the farm, Sanda takes him in as her adoptive son. She has a kind heart, but Scruff sometimes pushes her to her limits. She is a Nova Scotia Duck Tolling Retriever.
- Tricks – Sanda's son and Scruff's best friend. Even though he and Scruff are friends, he occasionally gets jealous of him. Nonetheless, he is still Scruff's partner in many of his antics. He is a Vizsla puppy.
- Miaow – Uncle Ron and Aunt Lil's pet cat. He has little love for the dogs on the farm, especially Scruff.
- White Socks – A fox who lives in the forest near the farm. He is said to be an endangered species of fox, and many hunters try to catch him but fail constantly. He calls many of the farm animals fools, knowing nothing about the wild world. Although selfish and unscrupulous, he does have a soft spot for Scruff, helping him on many occasions. He is said to have a crush on Sanda in the episode "Can't Cope".
- Haunty The Hound – The 300-year-old ghost of a hound dog who haunts the farmhouse cellar. He is a ghostly Beagle mix. He has an interesting outlook on life, due to living with wild and domesticated animals in his past life.
- Holly – Peter's girlfriend, a kindly and down-to-earth person. She is sometimes irritated by Peter's impulsive behavior, but deep down, she loves him very much.
- Princess – Holly's pet dog, a Pumi. Originally shown as haughty and stuck-up, she later falls in love with Scruff.
- Mr. Canute – Holly's father. A rich man, who deeply disapproves of the working-class and Peter's relationship with his daughter.
- Buttons – A mushroom vendor, who tries to make money through any means, legal or illegal. Unfortunately, that means he always tries to capture Scruff and use him for scientific research.
- Truffles – Buttons' mushroom-sniffing dog, a Bouvier des Flandres. Truffles does not agree with his master's unscrupulous activities but stays with him out of loyalty. He later has a romantic relationship with Sanda.
- One-Man Circus – A crooked clown. He is obsessed with kidnapping Scruff because he is a rare breed of dog. He wants to make him the star attraction of his circus.
- The Rats – A gang of rodents who prowl around the farm area, making trouble for anyone who runs into them.

== Other media ==
=== Films ===
Six feature films were made for television:

- Scruff: A Christmas Tale
- Scruff's Halloween
- Scruff in a Midsummer Night's Dream
- Scruff: Cinderella's Carnival
- Scruff and the Legend of St. George
- Scruff: Christmas Without Claus

The movies were all released on DVD by Image Entertainment.

=== Home video ===
A set of six DVDs were released between 2006 and 2007 by Digiview Entertainment. These DVDs do not have captions. The next line of Scruff DVDs were released in September and November 2009. Recently, the entire second season has been released on a 4-disc set. Currently, 69 episodes are available on DVD. The new line of Scruff DVDs, feature five of Scruff's television movies.

DVDs Released by Digiview Entertainment.

- Prizes Galore: Fugitives, Prizes Galore, All Because of A Mushroom Omelette, Going Up the Rock, Where's Miaow
- Too Much Sun: It's Time to Say Goodbye, Unless & Unnecessary, Too Much Sun, The Last of His Kind, A Testing Time
- Smells Like an Adventure: The Hero of Navell, Scruff & Peter Ltd., That's Not For Playing With, Smells Like an Adventure, Princess Always On His Mind
- What Will We Do with This Dog?: Wanted, A Home, What Will We Do with This Dog, The Course of Three Dogs, Craving for Eggs, Christmas is Almost Here!
- Circus Dog: Preying Around, A Circus Dog, The Circus Star, Fox Hunting, Bringing the Flock Home
- Staking Out Territory: A Canned Tail, The Runaway, Shackled by Fear, Staking Out Territory, Two Families, Just One Dog
