= Paloma Lago =

Spanish model and television presenter (born 1967)

- Born: Paloma Pérez-Lago González; 22 May 1967 (age 58); Ferrol (Corunna), Spain
- Occupation(s): Television presenter, model
- Spouse: Javier García Obregón (1990-2000)
- Website: http://www.juanchedas.com/modules/news/index.php?storytopic=5

Paloma Pérez-Lago González (born 22 May 1967 in Ferrol) is a Spanish model and television presenter.
