= The Fruitties =

- Genre: Slapstick; Comedy drama Fantasy
- Created by: Antoni D'Ocón
- Written by: Josep Viciana
- Voices of: Seán Barrett; Dan Flynn; Peter Whitman; Stacey Gregg
- Composers: Josep Roig Boada; Dave Cooke
- Countries of origin: Spain; France
- Original language: Spanish
- No. of series: 1
- No. of episodes: 52

Production
- Running time: 25 minutes
- Production companies: D'Ocon Films Productions; Tele Images Productions

Original release
- Network: TVE; TF1
- Release: 30 September 1990 – 21 June 1992

The Fruitties (Spanish: Los Fruittis) is a Spanish-French animated television series produced by D'Ocon Film Productions in collaboration with Tele Images Productions in 1989, created by Antoni D'Ocón and written by Josep Viciana. It originally aired on the Spanish television channel TVE. Originally, 91 episodes were created – each 25 minutes long – but the series was often repackaged as 52 episodes.

The series was dubbed into many languages and, in 1991, an English-language version of the show made its debut on British television.

A 3D computer graphics reboot of the Fruitties was announced in 2019.

== Story ==
The show features the adventures of anthropomorphic talking fruit, vegetables and various other plants who live in and around a forest island near a volcano. One day, the supposedly extinct volcano the Fruitties live around shows signs of erupting, thus forcing the Fruitties to send three explorers, the show's main characters Roly, Pak, and Thorny, to find them a new home.

== Characters ==
- Roly: a pineapple with a southern Spanish accent. He tends to brag and get the entire team in trouble. However, he is shown to be resourceful when he needs to be. He is also known as Gazpacho in the Spanish version.
- Pak: a knowledgeable banana who carries a backpack which contains an array of handy survival equipment for the team. He tends to bicker with Roly, due to Roly's laziness and bragging nature, yet he admires his sense of humor and his resourcefulness. He also has a rivalry with Monkus, the mad scientist monkey, who, unlike Pak, uses his scientific skills for evil. He is also known as Mochillo in the Spanish version.
- Thorny: a dim-witted cactus, speaking with a southern US accent. His prickly body saves the group from dangerous creatures on many occasions, although it is a pain in the neck to Roly. He is also known as Pincho in the Spanish version.
- Kumba: the only female and human in the group. She joins Roly, Pak and Thorny to guide them around the world. She sports a bikini made of leaves. In some episodes, she tries to meet her parents and older brother, Luke.
- Mayor Strawberry: a strawberry who's the mayor of the Fruitties' village. He is very strict and no-nonsense, caring and reasonable.
- Monkus: the main antagonist of the series and the Fruitties' arch-nemesis. He is a mad scientist monkey who seeks to conquer the world and impose his own rules. Unfortunately for him, his plans are always thwarted by the Fruitties. He is also known as Monus in the Spanish version.
- Bruce: a gorilla who's Monkus' henchman. He tries to help him to conquer the world. He is also known as Gluttonus in the Spanish version.
- Boss: a wild boar who speaks with a Bronx-style accent and is determined to capture and eat the Fruitties but always ends up failing.
- Brute: a wild boar who helps Boss to capture and eat the Fruitties even though he always fails. He is also known as Issac or Barry in some episodes.
- Thistle: a mischievous thistle who loves to pull pranks on the others.
- Artichoke the Pirate (or Pirate Artichoko): an artichoke pirate who was an enemy of the main characters at first, but later befriended them.

== Songs ==
The show is fondly remembered for its songs featured during both its opening and closing credits sequences.

In late 2014, a downloadable CD was released on iTunes. Though it does not include all the major instrumental tracks used in the show, such as Monkus's theme, it does contain all the major vocal tracks from the series and they are issued in two languages, both Spanish and English. The following URL hosts the CD:

https://music.apple.com/us/artist/docon-singers/906798318

Track List Spanish Album ITunes Release (Fruittis):

1. Intro de Los Fruittis
2. El Bosque de los Fruittis
3. Gazpacho el Campeón
4. Safari Fotográfico
5. El Pirata Alcachofo
6. Viva el Sol
7. Vaya Trio
8. Canción del Agua
9. Canción del Ahorro
10. Viva la Nieve
11. Viajando en Globo
12. Kumba

Track List UK Album ITunes Release (Fruitties):

1. The Fruitties Theme Song (Original Version)
2. The Fruitties' Forest (Original Version)
3. Roly, The Champion (Original Version)
4. Picture Taking (Original Version)
5. Artichoke, the Pirate (Original Version)
6. Tuttie Fruttie (Original Version)
7. Trio (Original Version)
8. Water (Original Version)
9. Saving (Original Version)
10. Live (Original Version)
11. Ballooning (Original Version)
12. Kumba (Original Version)

== Episodes ==
1. The Fruitties' Volcano
2. The Enigma of the Giants
3. The Floating Bottle
4. Turtle Swamp
5. The Flower Rebellion
6. Voyage to Canada
7. Terror Mountain
8. Springtime Fever
9. Journey to China
10. The Fruittilympics
11. The Fruitties in America
12. Baby Wolf
13. Prankster Thistle
14. Airborne Adventures
15. Voyage to Mexico
16. The Smart Little Duck
17. The Magical Lamp
18. A Scary Night
19. An Ice Island
20. Voyage to Paris
21. The Magical Feathers
22. Lost in the Arctic
23. Eastward Bound
24. The Thief of Paris
25. The Flower Thief
26. The Rain of Dissension
27. The Marine Ghost
28. The Painting Contest
29. Arizona Fruitty
30. The Mermaid's Singing
31. The Forest In Flames
32. Rigoletto's Book
33. One Quiet Day
34. The Rugby Match
35. The Seafaring Adventures
36. Operation Rescue
37. The Wild Boar Jinx
38. Searching for Thistle
39. The Dickpea from Outer Space
40. Journey to the Himalayas
41. The Wicked Wizard
42. The Floating Island
43. The Mountain of the Spirits
44. The Mysterious Drought
45. The Great Pyramid
46. The Endangered Jungle
47. Vocationing in the Canaries
48. Thorny's Birthday
49. The Conceited King
50. The Magic Frog
51. Cactus Desert
52. Polar Adventure
