= Fix & Foxi and Friends =

- Fix und Foxi
- Genre: Comedy
- Created by: Rolf Kauka
- Directed by: Antoni D'Ocón (season 1); Greg Ingram (Note: Fix & Foxi segments) (season 2); Margaret Parkes (Note: Fix & Foxi segments; Parkes is only credited in the German dub.) (season 2); Steve Moltzen (Note: The Peppercorn Family segments) (season 2); Greg Huculak (Note: The Peppercorn Family segments; Huculak is only credited in the German dub.) (season 2)
- Voices of: Jules de Jongh; Eric Meyers; Andy Turvey
- Theme music composer: Rolf Kauka
- Opening theme: "I am a friend, you know"
- Ending theme: "I am a friend, you know"
- Composer: Matthias Raue
- Countries of origin: Germany; Spain; Australia (season 2)
- Original languages: German; English; Spanish
- No. of seasons: 2
- No. of episodes: 52 (208 segments)

Production
- Executive producers: Wolfgang Heidrich; Peter Hille; Antoni D'Ocón (season 1); Gerry Travers (season 2)
- Producers: For WDR (season 1): Lucia Keuter; For RTV (season 1): Kerstin Esser (season 1); Ulrike Willner (season 1); For RTV (season 2): Ivanka Hahnenberger; For Energee (season 2): Rose-Ann Tisserand; Ed Trost
- Editors: Xavi Zapata (season 1); Djordje Luke (season 2); Guy Richards (season 2); Shane Elsmore (season 2)
- Running time: 22 minutes
- Production companies: D'Ocon Films; RTV Family Entertainment AG; Energee Entertainment (season 2)

Original release
- Network: Der Kinderkanal/Ki.KA (Germany); Clan TVE (Spain)
- Release: 26 February 2000 – 2002

Fix & Foxi and Friends is an animated television series and adaptation of Rolf Kauka's comic series Fix and Foxi. The series first aired in Germany in February 2000. The show ended sometime in 2002, producing 52 episodes over two seasons. It follows the adventures of the eponymous anthropomorphic fox brothers and their friends in the town of Foxburg, including Lupo the wolf, Professor Knox the raven, and the twins' Uncle Fax.

== Overview ==
Each episode consists of four segments, the first three of which star the title characters and one or more of their friends, family and pets. The fourth segment stars a family of anthropomorphic dogs called the Peppercorn Family. In addition, small comedic snippets featuring Makiki appear in between segments.

== Characters ==
=== Fix & Foxi ===
- Fix and Foxi - Twin fox brothers, who get busy and have fun throughout their time. Fix wears yellow overalls and has a tuft on his head while Foxi wears blue overalls.
- Lupo - A wolf and one of the twins' friends. He lives in a tower. Usually he is lazy, self-centered and has a love for Eusebia's cakes.
- Professor Knox - A raven and an absent-minded scientist. Half of his inventions go wrong, but his work greatly interests the twins.
- Uncle Fax - The twins' uncle, whom they live with. Quite tolerant to the twins' antics but full of opportunities to keep them content.
- Olma Eusebia - An elderly wolf who enjoys the twins' and her granddaughter's company. She is very good at making cakes and preventing Lupo from getting them.
- Lupini - Eusebia's granddaughter who is a good friend of the twins but sometimes is good at outsmarting them.
- Stinky and Limpy - Recurring canine thieves or smugglers who attempt to commit crimes, only to invariably be thwarted by the twins. Stinky is, by namesake, smelly, which bothers his partner Limpy.

=== The Peppercorn Family ===
- Papa - The father of the family. Very reckless, miserly and prone to making hasty decisions, he is not good at setting a good impression of his family and often the first to pick a fight with Snotty.
- Mama - The mother of the family. Has good common sense and often Papa's voice of reason and does more than her fair share of work in the house.
- Pip and Pep - Twins and the younger children of the family. They are quite mischievous and look for opportunities to pull pranks for whatever pleases them.
- Lucky - The adolescent of the family. He tries to be independent but always gets involved with family matters, but he sometimes enjoys the company of his younger siblings.
- Makiki - The family pet. A yellow mouse-like creature who behaves like a monkey.
- Snotty - A frog. The Peppercorns' unfriendly neighbour and the town mayor who lives just opposite their house and accuses visitors of being trespassers. As his name implies he is snobbish, rude, and dislikes the Peppercorns, but on rare occasions works with them to solve an important dilemma (mostly involving himself).
- Lizard - A lizard who has a seemingly endless slate of occupations in his work line. He does various odd jobs for the Peppercorns when hired.

== Voice cast ==
The voice actors for the series are uncredited, and a good number of them are currently unidentified, so this list is mainly going off of already-existing sources.

Character	English	German	Spanish
Fix	Jules de Jongh	David Turba	Maythe Guedes
Foxi	Jules de Jongh	Michael Wiesner	Rebeca Aponte
Lupo	Eric Meyers	Claudio Maniscalco	Frank Carreño
Professor Knox	Andy Turvey	Hermann Ebeling	Luis Carreño
Uncle Fax		Helmut Krauss	Luis Miguel Pérez
Olma Eusebia		Barbara Ratthey	
Lupini		Anne Helm	
Stinky	Eric Meyers		
Limpy			
Papa	Eric Meyers		
Mama	Lynn Cleckner		
Pip			
Pep			
Lucky	Jules de Jongh		
Makiki			
Snotty			
Lizard			

== Episodes ==
No.	Cartoons	Original release date
1	"Episode 1"	26 February 2000
Cold Cake = Lupo has a cold and Professor Knox has the pill to cure it.; Canary Catchers = Fix & Foxi try to catch Eusebia's escaped pet canary.; Slip Sliding Away = Lupo has a hard time ski racing with Fix & Foxi coming to his aid.; Missing Makiki = Makiki goes missing after Mama accuses him of stealing a cake from the kitchen.
2	"Episode 2"	TBA
Home Help = Professor Knox's Happy 2000 robot causes trouble for Fix & Foxi until they reprogramme it.; Up, Up and Away = Lupo gets airborne from a kite. Fix & Foxi try to get him down.; Garage Sale = Fix & Foxi sell Uncle Fax's old stuff, but have to recover his precious vase afterwards.; A Lucky Point of View = Lucky spies on Snotty, then his family goes inside Snotty's cellar.
3	"Episode 3"	TBA
Room for Rent = Lupo is hypnotized by the fortuneteller Mrs. Redsnake to steal valuables until Fix & Foxi put a stop to it.; Poodle Parlour = Fix & Foxi try hard to get Eusebia's dog Schnucki to take a bath.; Train Trip = Fix & Foxi tangle with a thief on a train to get their stolen luggage back.; Fender Bender = Lucky and Papa recklessly drive the car while their family is shopping.
4	"Episode 4"	TBA
What Cheek = Uncle Fax has a bad toothache, until his tooth accidentally knocked out.; Cave Man = Lupo and Fix & Foxi become lost in cave. A cave man shows them the way out.; Matinee Madness = Fix & Foxi and their friends try to run a cinema, causing some chaos.; Bedevilled = A squirrel is blown inside the house, but is mistaken for a demon.
5	"Episode 5"	TBA
Winner Takes All = Motorcyclist Harry has a competitive race against rollerskating Fix & Foxi; Alien Invasion = Fix & Foxi trail what they think is an alien robot, but is actually Professor Knox's trash collecting robot.; The Little Old Lady = Eusebia and Uncle Fax compete in a canoe race to determine who's better outdoors.; Nightmare at the Opera = The Peppercorns turn Snotty and his date's night at the opera upside down.
6	"Episode 6"	TBA
Witch of the Waves = Fix & Foxi and Lupo sail on a ghost ship and assist the captain not to repeat mistake that sunk the ship.; Mini-Knox = Professor Knox's megalomania cure makes him shrink, forcing Fix & Foxi to restore him.; Save Osmania = Fix & Foxi and Lupo are sucked into a video game and have to win it to escape.; Sleepless Nights = Mama prevents Papa from drinking coffee so he can get a good night sleep.
7	"Episode 7"	TBA
Mousing Around = A thieving mouse prevents Lupo from having a snack until they both share the food.; Frog Sandwich = While Lupo and Lupini have their picnic, a frog who is really a prince eats all their food.; The Getaway = Fix & Foxi come to the rescue of Lupo who is in Stinky and Limpy's getaway car.; Mama Goes on Strike = Fed up with her family's messiness, Mama goes on strike leaving Papa a hard day of responsibility.
8	"Episode 8"	TBA
Birthday Surprise = In an attempt to get a birthday present for Eusebia, Fix & Foxi and Lupo get themselves trapped in a pit.; Pyramid Scheme = An Egyptian spirit possesses Uncle Fax, so Fix & Foxi help him out.; Ever Bean Head? = Lupo and Lupini undergo a "Jack and the Beanstalk" adventure but with a magic carpet included.; Lights! Camera! Chaos! = Lucky films a Wild West movie, with Lizard and Snotty getting involved.
9	"Episode 9"	TBA
A Pain in the Neck = Lupo pesters Fix & Foxi to play ball when they are busy trying to paint.; Pretty Polly = Lupini and Fix & Foxi help Polly Parrot to rescue her captain from the tunnel of horrors.; The Son-in-Law = Lupo hopes to marry the Princess of Tandouri, but realises the price this has.; To Catch a Thief = A thief swipes Mama's purse and the Peppercorn family chase him.
10	"Episode 10"	TBA
Home Protection = Professor Knox has no way of getting in his security protected house so Fix & Foxi infiltrate it.; Treasure Hunt = Fix & Foxi dive below the ocean to find pirate treasure, hindered by Stinky and Limpy.; Genie Meany = Lupo finds a genie which makes Foxi a genie after three wishes, Lupo and Fix coming to the rescue.; Jinxed = Mrs. Crowford puts a jinx on Pip and Pep for a prank until Snotty crosses her path.
11	"Episode 11"	TBA
Double Trouble = A swindling salesman impersonates Lupo to rob a rich old lady's safe.; Mutiny Under the Sea = Lupini and Fix & Foxi get in the clutches of Captain Kate, but manage to outsmart her.; The Perfect Child = Fix & Foxi's unpleasant cousin Ferdinand comes to play nasty until his bad behaviour is exposed.; Luckio and Dolliet = Lucky and Dolly want to date, but Papa and Snotty won't allow it.
12	"Episode 12"	TBA
A Knight to Remember = In a jousting match at the fair, Fix & Foxi are facing what turns out to be robot knight.; Sir Fix and Sir Foxi = Fix and Foxi travel to the Middle Ages where they save Princess Clarissa from the evil wizard Zambango.; Prize Catch = In a fishing contest, Lupo has a hard time catching up with Fix & Foxi.; Baby on Board = The Peppercorns have to babysit and rescue Auntie Bea's baby daughter who crawls away.
13	"Episode 13"	TBA
Castle of Fear = Fix & Foxi and Uncle Fax enter the castle of Count Villain who intends to make them his servants.; Lupo's Treat = Lupo sneaks into Zambini's magic show causing some changes to the show.; Rainmaker = Dr. Cloudburst competes with Fix & Foxi on making it rain on the town.; Sabotage = Pip and Pep ruin Lucky's date with Wanda in order to go their promised trip to the park.
14	"Episode 14"	TBA
The Big Parcel = Lupo really wants to know what is inside a big parcel for Uncle Fax.; Toy Story = Some copycat rivals steal an inventor's advanced toys. Fix & Fox take them back.; Green Thumb = Professor Knox's super growth formula turns Lupo's household plant into a monster.; Mad Cook Disease = Mama gets obsessed with a TV show's healthy food, so the family puts a stop to this.
15	"Episode 15"	TBA
Prime Time at Lupo's = Lupo's attempt to fix his TV causes crazy cartoons to come out of the screen.; The Beauty Contest = Eusebia readies Lupini for a beauty contest. She wins by wearing a different dress.; Seems like old Times = Using Professor Knox's time machine, Lupo and Fix & Foxi explore the age of dinosaurs.; Happy Anniversary = Papa tries hard to make a special anniversary for Mama by not being himself.
16	"Episode 16"	TBA
Draggin' Dragon = A green dragon takes Lupo away with Fix & Foxi riding along to clear the matter up.; Musical Biscuits = Lupini and Fix & Foxi set off to rescue Professor Knox, kidnapped by thugs.; Candy Chaos = In a candy factory, Fix & Foxi and night watchman Lupo tangle with the machines and two crooks.; The Lovesick Pet = Makiki is unhappy and eventually reveals he is in love.
17	"Episode 17"	TBA
Crash Pilots = Lupo is attacked by a woodpecker as he takes a drive and ride on Fix & Foxi's tandem glider.; Mining Mayhem = Professor Knox and Fix & Foxi explore an old mine, trailed by Stinky and Limpy.; Three In One = Lupo competes with Fix & Foxi to be the first to get a skateboard free.; Minor Detour = Trying to take a shortcut to the fair, Papa gets the family in dangerous situations.
18	"Episode 18"	TBA
A Bear's Big Love = Lupo, Lupini, Fix & Foxi try bag an escaped circus bear hoping for a reward.; Big Trouble = Lupo plays with Professor Knox's size changing machine and Fix & Foxi proceed to stop him.; Haunted House = A ghost traps Lupo and haunts his house, so Fix & Foxi come to repel the spooks.; Scooter Blues = One summer, Pip and Pep take a joyride on a motor scooter. Lucky has to return it before his part-time boss finds out.
19	"Episode 19"	TBA
Small World = Fix & Foxi turn small from Professor Knox's shrinking drink and require his antidote to restore their sizes.; Lupo's Great Invention = Lupo's robotic invention goes maverick, but Lupini short circuits it.; Sand Island = On a sand island, Fix & Foxi rescue Lupini and some sandworms, then they escape the place.; Dinner at Eight = Papa's dinner for his boss is turned upside down by the family.
20	"Episode 20"	TBA
Cheated by a Cheetah = Mr. Fibbs pays Fix & Foxi to walk his pet cheetah, who runs at top speed.; The Game Show = In a game show, Lupo cheats against Fix & Foxi, but wins a pitiful prize.; The Leaf-Eating Machine = Stinky and Limpy steal a leaf-eating machine for robbery, but Fix & Foxi foil them.; Mad About the Bunny = The family adopts a rabbit, who proves to be destructive.
21	"Episode 21"	TBA
Ten Minute Pizza = Lupo tries to get free pizza off Fix & Foxy by delaying them for ten minutes.; Bloodsucker = Lupo, Lupini and Fix & Foxi venture into the graveyard and face a vampire.; Girls Only = Eusebia, Lupini and Lupo take part in a girls' bowling game, Lupo trying to cheat.; High Water = Papa's failed plumbing floods the house and eventually the whole town.
22	"Episode 22"	TBA
Spellbound = A witch wants to kiss and take Lupo for herself, but Fix & Foxi break her spells.; Inventor of the Year = Chaos occurs at the science contest, when Lupo plays with a replicator and a disapparator.; Trolling for Trouble = Fix and Foxi get involved with a dispute between Redbeard and the Troll King.; Over the Hill = Papa thinks Mama is dumping him for a dude, who turns out to be her lifesaving instructor.
23	"Episode 23"	TBA
Balloon Race = In a balloon race, Fix and Foxi are up against two cheating contestants.; Dogcatcher = Lupo, Fix & Foxi go on a mission to find Schnucki taken by dognapping dogcatchers.; The Hero Returns = Professor Knox and Fix & Foxi travel to the underworld save and the dwellers from a cyclops.; Makiki Meets his Match = Makiki tangles with a cute/vicious kitten, until he befriends it.
24	"Episode 24"	TBA
Potato Fish = Lupo and Fix & Foxi combine their rafting and fishing skills on a rough trip down the river.; Queen Lupinchen = A magic ring sends Fix & Foxi and Lupini into a fairy-tale land where they outsmart a dragon.; Boys Only = Lupini enters a haunted house to join the boys' club, then she plays a trick on them.; Papa Goes Green = Pip and Pep pester the neighborhood to recycle which eventually appeals to Papa.
25	"Episode 25"	TBA
Speed Boat Surprise = Fix & Foxi try to drive an out-of-control motor boat on land and sea.; Shadow Monster = Fix & Foxi and Eusebia face a shadow monster which eats people's shadows.; Interstellar Zoo = Lupini and Professor Knox escape the clutches of a Zebulon and rescue other aliens.; The Haunting = Pip, Pep and Lucky do some spooky stuff at Snotty with a synthesizer.
26	"Episode 26"	TBA
Magic Stones = Magic Stones transport Lupini and Fix & Foxi to on an adventure with Robin Hood.; Robbin' Hood = On a train ride, Lupini joins Robbin' Hood in his robberies to Eusebia's objections.; Unwelcome Guest = Lupo is tapping into Fix & Foxi's hospitality as they repair his broken tower.; Gonzo Groupies = Lucky, Pip and Pep sneak into the Spizzy Spagballs show, their parents in pursuit.
27	"Episode 27"	TBA
Maestro Lupo = Fix & Foxi and Lupo compete in modern art to win a motor scooter, but they all win it.; Hairy Hoax = Fix & Foxi try to scare away Lupini thinking she locked them in the attic.; Mole Holes = Fix & Foxi try to ward away a mole who is ruining Eusebia's flower garden.; Insuring Papa's Success = A wild goose chase ensues between Pip, Pep and Papa because Papa forgot his briefcase.
28	"Episode 28"	TBA
Window Cleaners = Professor Knox's window cleaning robot goes haywire so Fix & Foxi catch him.; High Adventure = Lupo is tasked to do the 'leap of doom' and wins the prize for doing so.; Case of the Missing Gnome = Fix & Foxi solve a mystery of robot gnomes stealing stuff for some mad scientist.; Stealing Michelangelo = When Pip and Pep take Snotty's statue, Snotty and Papa escalate a destructive garden feud.
29	"Episode 29"	TBA
Flower Power = Lupo destroys Uncle Fax's flowerbeds, but Fix & Foxi fix it just in time.; That Dog = Fix & Foxi work a lot on Van Big Bucks' dog in preparation for the dog show.; Charming Lupo = A cobra attracted to Lupo's fluting is on loose, Fix & Foxi going after it.; The Birthday Party = Pip and Pep spend their birthday with Hilda and Elmor and learn to have fun with them.
30	"Episode 30"	TBA
Streamline Fax = Fix & Foxi try to help Uncle Fax lose some weight, but it isn't working.; Pigeon Post = Led by a pigeon, Lupo and Fix & Foxi rescue a girl from a monstrous boar.; The Phantom of Foxburg = Fix & Foxi and Lupini are off to rescue Eusebia from the Phantom of Foxburg.; Buckets O' Fun = The family try to deal with their leaky roof until Lizard fixes it.
31	"Episode 31"	TBA
Rat Hunt = Eusebia has a rat problem in her kitchen, but Fix & Foxi find it's a hamster.; O Lucky Lupo = Lupo and Fix & Foxi chase a dog with Lupo's lottery ticket which turns out to be a wild goose chase.; Ups and Downs = Professor Knox creates a reverse gravity zone which messes with his mind.; Ladies Day = Mama holds a ladies' meeting at the house. Papa tries to sneak in dressed as a lady, but the children expose him.
32	"Episode 32"	TBA
Alarm Alert = Fix & Foxi bypass Professor Knox's security in Uncle Fax's house to get their soccer gear.; Hypno-Lupo = Fix & Foxi and Lupini play along with Lupo's hypnotism and fluster him.; Happy Birthday Uncle Fax = An escaped gorilla complicates Fix & Foxi's preparations for Uncle Fax's birthday party.; Camp Catastrophe = Snotty is making the family's camping trip difficult for them until a bear drives him away.
33	"Episode 33"	TBA
A Hole in One = Fix & Foxi and their friends play against Professor Knox's golf computer managing to bust it.; Pumping Pumpkins = Fix & Foxi thwart Lupo's cheating attempts to win the pumpkin contest.; Monkey See, Monkey Do = Fix & Foxi get an escaped zoo monkey to the circus rather than back to the zoo.; Surreal Life = The Peppercorns star on TV. The end result has very high ratings.
34	"Episode 34"	TBA
Whale of a Time = Lupo and Fix & Foxi enter a whale submarine and reform the greedy fish grabbing captain.; Lifesaver = To stop Eusebia's counter-productive life debt, Fix and Foxi pretend Lupo needs saving.; Havin' a Ball = A mean dog pursues Lupo and Fix & Foxi as they retrieve their ball from the dump.; Music Melee = Lucky is about to have his first gig, but his dreams are shattered, so the family form a band.
35	"Episode 35"	TBA
For Sale = Fix & Foxi mess up the house thinking Uncle Fax was going to sell it, so they hastily tidy up.; Little Fishbowl of Horrors = Fix & Foxi get a Whalaccuda Fish which eats a lot and grows fast.; Race Day = Fix & Foxi and Lupini compete in a bike race against the cheating Lupo.; The Magic Stone = Lucky finds a magic wishing stone, but they use up all three wishes.
36	"Episode 36"	TBA
The Great Helicopter Heist = Fix & Foxi outsmart a thief who steals Eusebia's necklace with a toy helicopter.; The Visitors = Fix & Foxi and Lupini try to get Eusebia away so Uncle Fax can watch TV in peace.; Toying with Trouble = Fix & Foxi dress up as girls for commercial to get free toys.; Papa's R&R = Lucky, Pip and Pep ruin Papa's peace and quiet fishing trip.
37	"Episode 37"	TBA
The Early Bird = Fix & Foxi hurriedly fetch Uncle Fax's train ticket before he misses the train.; The Pearl = Lupo gets Fix & Foxi to help him pry open a giant oyster for its pearl.; The Mice will Play = Fix & Foxi try to stop Professor Knox's robocat from catching their house mouse.; Fool's Gold = The Peppercorns go digging for gold round the garden and Lucky and Mama make a big discovery.
38	"Episode 38"	TBA
A Pizza the Action = Fix & Foxi and Uncle Fax take care of Pizza Parlor doing it by hand rather than machine.; Zoo be Doo = Fix & Foxi and Lupini try to catch an escaped zoo monkey and recover Eusebia's car tire.; Rescuing the Party = Professor Knox's airship malfunctions, so Fix & Foxi try to ensure a safe landing.; Best Pet on the Planet = The Peppercorns prepare Makiki for the pet show contest against Snotty's parrot.
39	"Episode 39"	TBA
Clear Sailing = Fix & Foxi and Lupini have to be deckhands on a sailing boat until they prove their leadership.; The Masterpiece = Fix & Foxi try to get Uncle Fax's rare painting back from the trash dump, but a bear has it.; Bedtime Bedlam = Fix & Foxi suffer insomnia from numerous noises preventing them from getting an early morning start.; It's a Gift = Pip, Pep and Lucky break their Great Aunt's statuette and complicate the situation greatly.
40	"Episode 40"	TBA
Ravenous Robot = Fix & Foxi face Professor Knox's malfunctioning recycling robot with a tennis match.; Fresh Outta Luck = Fix & Foxi tease Uncle Fax with bad luck occurrences, then Uncle Fax tricks them back.; What Goes Up = Fix & Foxi attempt to rescue Lupini on a hang glider and collide with Lupo who is fishing.; Mad Scientists = Pip and Pep play with Lucky's chemistry set which escalates into an explosion.
41	"Episode 41"	TBA
Wallpaper Madness = Lupo does a sloppy job wallpapering, but comes in clutch when Fix & Foxi do the job.; The Amazing Schnucki = Lupo takes Schnucki to a circus and Fix & Foxi have to rescue them from a fierce lioness.; Dancing for Donuts = Lupo enters a dancing contest to try grabbing the prize pastries, but unwittingly wins the prize.; La Cage Aux Peppercorns = Pip, Pep and Lucky try to spoil Papa's dinner with Jay Smith Catalyst.
42	"Episode 42"	TBA
Snow Way Out = Fix & Foxi chase after a snow-sliding Schnucki and eventually manage to rescue him.; Apes of Wrath = On a safari, Fix & Foxi and their friends study gorillas who take a liking to Lupo's candy bars.; The Last One Pays = Fix & Foxi and their friends race to a restaurant where the last arrival pays the bill.; Chocko Blocko = Pip and Pep try earn money to complete their Chocko Blocko card collection, but their methods don't work out.
43	"Episode 43"	TBA
Fax the Fearless = Fix & Foxi expose Fax's distant cousin as a scaredy cat for an explorer.; A Clean Sweep = Fix & Foxi and Lupo get cleaning Eusebia's fireplace and chimney making a new mess too.; Deuce Coupe Duo = Fix & Foxi challenge a cheating contestant in the Junior Grand Prix.; Crash Course = Pip, Pep and Papa go on a reckless flying trip in a biplane, having a hard time landing.
44	"Episode 44"	TBA
Very Fishy! = While diving, Fix & Foxi pursue Stinky and Limpy, poaching fish, scare them away and free the fish.; Swine Lake = A thief steals from Fix & Foxi Professor Knox's camera, which causes a pig and Lupini to body swap.; Home Alone Times Two = Fix & Foxi battle two burglars, using their toys for weaponry.; Tweet & Sour = A little bird takes advantage of Mama's good nature to live in the house.
45	"Episode 45"	TBA
Say Cheese = A trick on Uncle Fax sends him tumbling in a barrel all around the fairground.; Splish, Splash = Fix & Foxi and Lupini prevent a greedy captain from catching a whale for a show.; McMammoth = Professor Knox excavates a herd of frozen mammoths, which Lupo unleashes.; School Pet = Pip and Pep's chance to bring Buster the school pet iguana arouses trouble at home.
46	"Episode 46"	TBA
Spare Parts = Fix & Foxi and Lupini repair Eusebia's car with spare parts, giving the car a different look.; Little Faxie = A bump on the head reverts Uncle Fax to a childlike state until Fix & Foxi deal with it.; Rest Stop - Earth = An alien family settles in Uncle Fax's house, forcing Fix & Foxi to take drastic measures.; Sludge-O-Rama = Pip and Pep turn the tables on the cheating host of the Sludge-O-Rama TV Show.
47	"Episode 47"	TBA
Pop Corn Call = A hot dog vendor steals Professor Knox's Popcorn plant, Fix & Foxi and Lupini giving chase.; Voyage to See the Sea = Fix & Foxi dive down to rescue Professor Knox, as he searches for Incrediblus Maximus.; Cake Bandages = Fix & Foxi try to stop Lupo from pooling Professor Knox's robo-valets.; The Cherry Tree Siege = Pip and Pep try defend their tree and treehouse from Snotty.
48	"Episode 48"	TBA
The Fearful Bull = Fix & Foxi pursue a bull who is afraid of the color red, but the bull overcomes his fear.; Lupo's Little Neighbour = Fix & Foxi try to help Lupo babysit his neighbor who is a problem child.; Junior Forest Rangers = In the forest, Fix & Foxi keep Lupo out of trouble during his photography.; Nice Old Snotty = Snotty is being nice and then nasty to the Peppercorns. It turns out Snotty's cousin was visiting.
49	"Episode 49"	TBA
Tree House = Fix & Foxi save Lupini and their tree house being deposited in the dump.; Flame to the Games = Fix & Foxi run fast to retrieve Schnucki and an Olympic racer's torch.; Clowning Around = Fix & Foxi come to Lupo's aid when he gets involved in a circus act, creating an act of their own.; Make Mine Makiki = Makiki is made to be a commercial star, becoming pretty standoffish.
50	"Episode 50"	TBA
Hair-Raising Tale = Professor Knox's hair growth formula works too well on Lupo, but Knox provides the counter formula.; Bed & Breakage = Eusebia rents her bedroom to prissy Lady Penelope, who plans to steal Eusebia's wealth.; Roller Coaster Raid = Stinky and Limpy rob roller coaster riders with a giant magnet, but Fix & Foxi thwart their scheme.; The P-Files = Trapped in a canister, Makiki is mistaken for an alien life form.
51	"Episode 51"	TBA
That's the Ticket! = Fix & Foxi and Lupini search for Eusebia's winning lottery ticket, all for nothing.; Presto Change-o = Fix & Foxi play with a magician's wand and flood their house with ice-cream.; Red, She Said = While Lupini and Fix & Foxi recreate a film of Red Riding Hood, Lupo tries to steal the show.; Last Orders = The Peppercorns dine in a fancy restaurant, which escalates chaotic action.
52	"Episode 52"	2002
A Prickly Problem = Mysterious things happen in the garden, which Fix & Foxi reveal to the work of hedgehogs.; Detect This! = Fix & Foxi go detective to find who took Eusebia's cake, revealed to be celebrating ants.; Surprise = Fix & Foxi and Lupini prepare a surprise cake for Schnucki, Eusebia thinks is for her.; The Obstacle Course = Pip & Pep race against their family to prevent their teacher telling on them.
