= D'Ocon Films =

Liquidated Spanish animation studio in Barcelona (1976–2011)

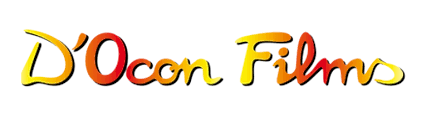
- Type: Private
- Industry: Animation studio
- Founded: 1976
- Founder: Antoni D'Ocón
- Defunct: 2011
- Fate: Liquidated, dissolved
- Headquarters: Barcelona, Spain
- Website: doconfilms.com

D'Ocon Studios (also known as D'Ocon Films or D'Ocon Productions, formerly D'Ocon Film Productions) was a Spanish animation studio and multimedia company from Barcelona, Catalonia. It was founded in 1976 by Antoni D'Ocón.

== History ==
D'Ocon Films was founded in 1976 by Antoni D'Ocón, then 18 years old.

The studio initially focused on producing puppet series before breaking new ground in animation with the creation of the D'Oc animation system, which accelerated the production of animated series without compromising frame-by-frame image quality.

The studio's first animated series, The Fruitties, became a success and was sold in several countries. Among the other series producied by D'Ocon are Problem Child, Delfy and His Friends and Pocket Dragon Adventures.

In 2000, D'Ocon Studios received the National Communication Award in the television category. In 2011, the company began liquidation after failing to emerge from the voluntary bankruptcy it had filed in May 2009.

== Productions ==
Title	Debut	End	Original network
Los Aurones	1987	1988	Televisión Española
The Fruitties	1990	1992	Televisión Española
Chip & Charly	1991	1992	France 2
Delfy and His Friends	1992	1992	Televisión Española
Basket Fever	1992	1996	TVE
Sylvan (TV series)	1995	1996	FORTA
Pocket Dragon Adventures	1996	1997	
Problem Child	1993	1994	USA Network
Fix & Foxi and Friends	2000	2002	Der Kinderkanal/Ki.KA (Germany); Clan TVE (Spain)
Scruff	2000	2004	Televisió de Catalunya
