= Connie the Cow =

Spanish animated children's television series created by Josep Viciana

- Title card
- Spanish: La vaca connie
- Genre: Children's television series Animation
- Created by: Josep Viciana
- Theme music composer: Josep Roig Boada
- Opening theme: "Connie the Cow"
- Ending theme: "Connie the Cow"
- Composer: Josep Roig
- Country of origin: Spain
- Original language: Spanish
- No. of seasons: 3
- No. of episodes: 44 (128 segments)

Production
- Executive producer: Cristina Brandner
- Running time: 21 minutes
- Production company: Neptuno Films

Original release
- Network: TVE 2
- Release: September 8, 2001 – 2005

Connie the Cow is a Spanish animated children's television series created by Josep Viciana and designed by Roman Rybakiewicz, and produced by Spain-based studio Neptuno Films for TV3. The show combined 2D cel animation for the backgrounds with 3D computer animation for the characters.

The series ran for three seasons and 44 episodes. It was broadcast in Spain from September 8, 2001, to 2005.

== Plot ==
A curious young cow named Connie explores her colorful world, including her farmland, the forest, and sometimes the woods. Those adventures are often accompanied with Patch the dog, Grouch the fox, Wally the bird, or sometimes all three. The show is narrated. The series was very formulaic most of the time: Connie would be seen walking out of her shed, sometimes with her parents walking behind her, and she sets off to find her friends. When there is a problem needed to be solved during the day, Connie and her friends come up with various creative solutions to accomplish the task. Recurring and repetitive music leitmotifs play throughout the show, and are sometimes changed up to be played in different instruments. At the end of almost every episode, Connie's house during nighttime is shown, and the same image of Connie and her parents sleeping inside the shed is shown almost every time as the narrator speaks about the lesson Connie had learned from the day, depicting that she is thinking or realizing about it in her sleep, and wishes Connie sweet dreams. However, there are a few episodes where Connie is not shown sleeping at the end, due to it still being day time.

== Characters ==
- Connie (voiced by Andrea Vega Guzman in season 1 and Ayesha Mendham in seasons 2–3) is a young female cow. She's blue with a few big white spots around her fur, her small horns and muzzle are yellow, she has a big black nose and she has a red collar with a small yellow bell attached to it. She is very curious and always tries new things.
- Patch (voiced by Alex Warner) is a playful dog who lives near Connie's farmhouse with the pig family. His fur is brown with a few dark blue spots and he has a big black nose like Connie's. He is Connie's friend and appears with her in almost every episode. He is introduced in the episode "Patch the Stray Dog".
- Wally is a plump, multicolored bird who lives in a tree near the farm. He is introduced in the episode "Wally Bird"
- Grouch is an irritable fox with orange fur and white spots around his paws and tail. He is introduced in the episode "The Grouchy Fox".
- Mollie and Bill are Connie's mother and father. They give Connie advice and help out with problems. Molly is a typical dairy cow with white fur and black spots. Her horns and muzzle are yellow. Like Connie, she has a black nose and she has a red collar with a small yellow bell attached to it, although she only sometimes wears it. Bill is a strong bull with black fur. His horns and muzzle are blue and he has a black nose.
- Clara is Connie's grandmother, who wears a flowered hat. She has white fur with light blue spots. Her horns and muzzle are yellow and she has a black nose. Connie often visits her grandmother and learns from her about the forest. She is introduced in the episode "Connie and Her Grandmother".
- Hedgy is a hedgehog who wears a sock over his nose. He is introduced in the episode "The Curious Butterfly".
- Maddie is a lamb with orange wool.
- Paddy and Pearl are pigs and Connie's neighbors. Paddy is a purple big while Pearl is pink. They are introduced in the episode "Patch The Stray Dog".
- Dodger is a naughty and crafty cat who likes to steal cakes and tease other animals. He has sharp teeth, an orange snout and legs, and an orange and black striped tail. He is the secondary antagonist. He is introduced in the episode "The Crafty Cat".
- Snooze is a sleepy turtle.
- Sergeant is a sheep dog with a blunt attitude. He has blue fur and a black nose. He is introduced in the episode "The Crafty Cat".
- Spike is a spider who likes to play a harp that he made with twigs, leaves, and silk.
- Tom is an ant with six purple legs and antennas. He is part of the ant colony that work together carrying the food and plants.
- Todd is a colorful mole who lives underground.
- Nibble is a squirrel that is often very busy carrying every acorn to her tree. She has two children.
- Donna is a mother duck who floats across the river with her ducklings.
- Fast Feather is an eagle who lives on top of a nearby mountain, puffing the clouds across the sky with his wings.
- Sandy is a sea turtle who lives at the beach. She has a flower-patterned shell.
- Norbert is a beaver who spends his time gnawing wood to build dams.
- Ronny is a mouse who rolls his cheese through the grass.
- Sam is a rabbit who lives in the forest.
- Henry is an owl who helps Connie with her adventures.
- Cyril is a friendly wolf and one of Patch's friends.
- Burt is a bat that lives in a nearby cave.
- Finny is a fish.
- John is a frog.
- Scoot is a snake who likes to sleep.
- Belinda is an orange goat.
- William is a rainbow-colored worm.
- Rebecca is a mother chicken with several chicks.
- George is a crab.
- Buddy is a mouse.
- Timmy is an orange bear. He was introduced in the episode "The Little Bear".

== Episodes ==
=== Season 1 ===
1. "A Curious Butterfly": While Connie is having breakfast with her parents, she suddenly sees a butterfly. She begins to chase it, until she realizes she is far away from home. The butterfly then helps her find her way back to her parents.
2. "Present for Mummy": Connie searches for a birthday present for her mother.
3. "The Christmas Tree": Connie needs help finding a special Christmas tree her mother told her about.
4. "The Crafty Cat": A sly and crafty cat named Dodger manipulates Connie into stealing three cakes that Sergeant, the sheep dog, is guarding. After Connie realizes she has been manipulated, she tells everyone the truth and together they save the last cake from Dodger.
5. "The Lazy Clouds": Connie sees that the sheep have no water to drink, so she climbs a nearby mountain to ask the clouds to rain.
6. "Patch the Stray Dog": When Paddy and Pearl leave Connie to play alone, a stray dog named Patch appears from a nearby bush and Connie helps him find a family.
7. "The Ugly Caterpillar": Connie visits Henry The Owl, who explains to her how caterpillars turn into butterflies.
8. "Connie and Her Grandmother": Connie's grandmother takes Connie on a nature walk to show her how to love and respect nature.
9. "The Grumpy Fox": When a fox eats a poisonous flower, his stomach begins to hurt. Connie and Patch help him to relieve his pain.
10. "Wally Bird": Connie, Patch, and Grouch enjoy a picnic, but while they play for a while, Wally eats their food. When they search for more food, they become lost, but Wally help them find their way back to the picnic.
11. "Hide and Seek": While playing hide and seek with Wally and Grouch, Connie then realizes she can't count. She asks the animals and insects around the forest to help her count to ten.
12. "The Little Bear": An orange bear named Timmy gets lost in the snow and Connie helps him find his way back to his parents.
13. "A Cold Weather Adventure": On a snowy day, Connie is cold and Maddie the lamb decides to help her. Maddie becomes tired and Connie decides to carry her, noticing that she then feels warm thanks to Maddie's wool.
14. "The Snow Ghost": Connie, Grouch, and Patch mistake a mole for a snow ghost.
15. "The Snowman": While Connie is walking in the forest, she sees a sad snowman. He explains to her that he doesn't have a cold environment to keep him from melting.
16. "The Wolf": When Connie visits Sergeant, Maddie, and her parents, she meets a friendly wolf named Cyril who has been misjudged by other animals.
17. "The Busy Squirrel": Connie spends a cold, wintry day playing with some squirrels.
18. "The Magic Spring": Connie is thirsty and finds a waterfall. A bee tries to warn Connie it isn't safe, but she takes a drink anyway and becomes very small.
19. "The Lonely Flower": Connie and Patch play matchmaker to a pair of lonely flowers.
20. "The Bird Who Didn't Know How To Fly":
21. "A Visit to Grandmother's": Connie is invited to visit her grandmother's home in the woods.
22. "A Sock for Hedgy": Hedgy loses the sock he wears on his nose and is shivering in the cold weather, so Connie and Patch help him find his sock.
23. "The Surprise Party": Connie, Grouch, and Patch prepare a surprise birthday party for Wally.
24. "Wally's Nest": Wally loses his nest and Connie and Patch help him find it.
25. "A Toy for Patch": Connie and Patch play with a ball, but it is damaged, so Connie works to create a new toy for Patch.
26. "The Search for Patch's Color": Connie helps Patch reunite with his original color.
27. "Connie Wants to Be Different" While visiting with her grandma, Connie sees how the other animals are all very different from her.
28. "Patch's Wonderful Nose": Connie, Wally, and Grouch try to help Patch, who realizes he can no longer smell anything.
29. "Connie and the Colors": Grandma Clara teaches the friends a game about colors.
30. "Connie and the Little Lamb": Connie agrees to take care of Maddie, a lamb.
31. "Connie and the Turtle": Connie and Patch help a lost turtle return to her family.
32. "A Hot Day": With the help of her friend the beaver, Connie creates a new swimming pool just for her insect friends.
33. "The Travelling Tree":
34. "The Five Senses":
35. "Connie and the Stork":
36. "The Race": Snooze and Dodger have a race that Dodger is determined to win.
37. "Connie and the Butterflies": Connie helps two butterflies find a good tree in which to live.
38. "Mummy's Hat": Connie's mom gives Connie a hat to deliver to Grandma Clara.
39. "Adventures on the River":
40. "What a Lot of Babies": Connie and Patch have fun with birds.
41. "Connie and the Cricket": Connie tries to imitate an amazing cricket.
42. "Detective Connie": Connie and Patch's basket suddenly disappears and they work together to solve the mystery.
43. "A Trip with Mum and Dad": Connie and her parents go on a trip around the forest.
44. "Connie and Her Friends": Connie experiences jealousy when she sees her friend Patch visiting with Cyril the wolf.
45. "The Trial of Strength" While Connie is making a new home for Sam the rabbit, Dodger challenges her to a test of strength.
46. "Connie Learns About Shapes": Connie and her friends play a game about shapes.
47. "The Vain Bird": Connie meets a musical bird and a spider who both have beautiful singing voices and the friends plan a singing competition.
48. "Follow the Clues": Grandma Clara teaches Connie and Patch a game that leads them to some special animals.
49. "Connie and Patch in Disguise": Connie and Patch are determined to find excellent disguises.
50. "The Lucky Stone" Connie receives a lucky stone from Belinda.
51. "The Bridge": Connie's father helps Connie and her friends create a bridge across the river.
52. "The Birthday Present":

=== Season 2 ===
1. "The Beaver's Dam": Connie and Patch cannot get water from the beaver's dam.
2. "The Ant and the Grasshopper": Connie's friend Sergeant tells her friends the story of the ant and the grasshopper.
3. "Connie and the Tin Can": Connie and her friends learn about recycling and upcycling.
4. "Connie and the Fruit":
5. "The Talking Mountain":
6. "The Secret Den":
7. "Burt Wants to Play": Connie and Patch help Burt the bat learn to have fun playing.
8. "Honey for Mummy": Connie searches for honey to make a cake.
9. "It's Going to Rain":
10. "Lost in the Snow":
11. "Connie and the Riddle":
12. "The Sad Tortoise":
13. "The Mysterious Wood":
14. "Grandma Makes Jam":
15. "The Wonderful World of Nature":
16. "The Cat and the Puppy": Dodger tricks Patch out of a cake that Connie's grandmother made for him.
17. "Where's the Food?":
18. "Animals and Their Jobs":
19. "Going South for the Winter":
20. "Wally's Hat":
21. "Connie Hunts for Treasure":
22. "The Creature that Could Change Colour":
23. "Where's Spike?":
24. "Baby Bird and His Nest":
25. "The Multi-Colored Snow":
26. "The Ant Who Couldn't Concentrate":
27. "The Sleepy Bird": Connie and Patch protect a sleep-walking Wally.
28. "Spot the Difference":
29. "The Little Piglet":
30. "Connie's Breakfast":
31. "The Mysterious Plant":
32. "The Singing Frog":
33. "Looking for Presents":
34. "Connie and the Insects":
35. "The Valley of the Butterflies":
36. "The Strongest Animal in the Woods":
37. "Patch Wants to Fly": Dodger hypnotizes Patch to make him think he is a bird.
38. "Making Colors": Grandma Clara teaches Connie and Patch how to make new colors.
39. "The Day it Snowed in Springtime":
40. "Who Do I Look Like?":
41. "Playing with Stones":
42. "The Adventurous Ant":
43. "Connie's Orchestra": Connie and her friends create an orchestra using different types of instruments.
44. "A Different Breakfast":
45. "Lots and Lots of Walnuts":
46. "Where Does it Belong?":
47. "Looking for Grandma": Connie sets out on a quest for her grandma.
48. "Connie and the Apple Tree":
49. "Cactus Flower":
50. "Songs in the Snow": After Connie hears her mother sing a beautiful Christmas song, Connie and Patch ask their friends if they know any songs, but they only know the same one Connie's mother sang. Hedgy then sings an original song they all can sing together.
51. "The Vain Butterfly":

=== Season 3 ===
1. "The Big Surprise":
2. "The Selfish Butterflies":
3. "Looking For The Color Yellow":
4. "All Shapes and Sizes":
5. "The Sounds of Nature":
6. "Snow in the Woods":
7. "The Animal That Had One Leg":
8. "The Puzzle":
9. "The Strange Trail":
10. "The Yellow Ball":
11. "Connie Helps the Flowers":
12. "Daddy's Party": Connie plans a birthday party for her father.
13. "Good Friends":
14. "Happy Times":
15. "The Fruit Festival":
16. "Connie and the Rodents":
17. "Look Carefully":
18. "A Ferret Called Willow":
19. "Nature Day":
20. "A Time for Everything":
21. "The Story of the Two Friends": Connie makes up a story about the fun she's had with Patch.
22. "Dear Mummy and Daddy": Connie writes a poem for her parents.
23. "The Basket of Blackberries": Connie and Patch search for a missing basket of blackberries.
24. "The Little Fish":
25. "Hedgy's Spines":
26. "Mummy Tells a Story": Connie takes care of Maddie the lamb and Connie's mother tells them both a story about a group of caterpillars.

== Broadcast ==
In February 2001, AAC Kids and TV-Loonland AG jointly acquired the distribution, merchandising, and licensing rights to the series, with Loonland holding the rights for Europe, including the UK, and AAC Kids for all other territories. Neptuno Films retained all rights to the series in Spain.

In April 2001, TV-Loonland announced that it had pre-sold the United Kingdom broadcast rights to Disney Channels Worldwide, with it later airing on the Playhouse Disney channel. In November 2004, the company extended the Disney deal to Germany . In Germany, the series was also aired as the final segment in certain mid-2000s episodes of Sesame Street's German co-production Sesamstraße.

In the US, the show was broadcast on Noggin from September 8, 2003 to 2007. It was repeated from 2017 to 2018 on Starz Kids & Family.
