= Sylvan (TV series) =

- Genre: Adventure; Fantasy; Romance
- Created by: Antoni D'Ocón
- Written by: Toni Babia; Antoni D'Ocón; Ramón Herrero; Josep Peña
- Directed by: Antoni D'Ocón
- Composers: Miquel Àngel Riaza; Xavier Romeu
- Country of origin: Spain
- Original language: Catalan
- No. of episodes: 91

Production
- Producer: Antoni D'Ocón
- Running time: 30 min
- Production companies: D'Ocon Films; La Forta

Original release
- Network: TV3 (Catalonia)
- Release: September 12, 1995 – June 23, 1996

Sylvan is a Spanish animated series created by Antoni D'Ocón, produced by D'Ocon Films, and co-produced by La Forta in 1989. It premiered on September 12, 1995 on TV3, running for 91 episodes until June 23, 1996, and was subsequently rebroadcast several times on Super3. The series is based on the legends of Robin Hood.

== Plot ==
The series is set in Europe during the Middle Ages, in the kingdom of King Charles, when everything was magic and sorcery. Sylvan, a man of the woods, is a young knight who, one day, is found badly wounded in the enchanted forest by the magician Linmar. He is chosen to defend the interests of good and keep evil at bay. With help from his friends, each episode charts his struggle against the negative forces that threaten justice and liberty.

== Characters ==
- Sylvan - A fox and the heroic knight in King Charles' kingdom. He has a tuft of blonde hair and wears a red tunic with yellow lining and a Phrygian cap. He is called the "Son of the Woods" due to being found wounded in the forest. From that incident, and without knowing anything about his past, he dedicates himself to fighting the Forces of Evil, led by Captain Darkness, his arch-enemy. He is young, cunning, brave, clever, and a great fighter, but the intelligence and the spirit of giving are what make him emerge victorious from all the adventures that he experiences in the kingdom of King Charles. Sylvan, however, is marked by fate, and in the long run, he will have to face his own legend.
- Evila - A grey goat with who wears a black dress and veil, and an antagonist who makes use of witchcraft.
- El Rey Carlos/King Charles - An African lion who defends and protects the kingdom from the evil forces. He wears an aqua suit, with a brass buckle leather belt and traditional king's robe. Sometimes it may seem that he acts like an authoritarian king, but deep down this is not the case. Over the years he has lost his adventurous spirit and is now content with the kingdom that he has. As the master and lord of everything seen around the castle, he has a few worries that hardly let him sleep, such as Linmer destroying a part of the castle every week, and his daughter Princess Diana's obsession with becoming a knight and fighting in the crusades. Worst of all, however, is his lifelong enemy, Captain Darkness, the emissary of the Forces of Evil.
- Capitan Tinieblas/Captain Darkness - A boar and Sylvan's arch-enemy, who leads the Forces of Evil. He wears a black suit of armour and a cape.
- El Caballero de la Muerte/The Death Warrior - A champion in a suit of armour with a frogman-styled visor.
- Princesa Diana/Princess Diana - An African lioness who wears a cream-coloured dress and a pink veil. She is Sylvan's love interest. Orphaned from a very young age, she has always grown up surrounded by knights, soldiers and the roar of battles. Unlike girls her age, Diana has only one obsession: to be knighted by her father. If it does not work out, she intends to become a nun, so that she does not have to marry any of the rich and old nobles that King Charles proposes to her. She is brave, adventurous, smart and very daring. With Sylvan, she will fight in the hope that one day he will look at her with different eyes, to become more than just a friend.
- El Mago Linmer/Linmer - A magician who wears a purple hat with a jewel and purple robes. He is witty, stubborn, funny, endearing, and sometimes a bit of a swashbuckler, and uses his tricks to create all kinds of inventions that often end up backfiring. King Charles made the mistake of welcoming him to the castle, and every week he has to bring the masons to repair the damage. Of course, he has shown more than once that without his protection against curses, the Forces of Evil would have a much easier time invading the kingdom.
- El Prior/The Prior - A mouse who wears a monk robe and sandals.
- Conde Greedo/Count Greedo - A pig with a black beard.
- Fidel - A tiger who wears an armor and helmet.

== Episodes ==
1. "El Hijo Del Bosque"/"The Son of the Woods"
2. "El Canto Fatal"/"The Fatal Song"
3. "Panico En El Bosque"/"Panic in the Woods"
4. "Donde Empieza El Abismo"/"The Start of the Abyss"
5. "Niebla Maldita"/"The Mist of Vengeance"
6. "El Arca De La Felicidad"/"The Chest of Happiness"
7. "El Saco De La Peste"/"The Plague Bag"
8. "El Sello Real"/"The Royal Seal"
9. "Ofensa Al Mal"/"On the Offensive"
10. "Todos Tenemos Algo Que Esconder"/"We've All Got Something to Hide"
11. "Amor Ciego"/"Love Is Blind"
12. "En Penumbra"/"Schrouded in Shadows"
13. "Gritos En La Noche"/"Shouts in the Night"
14. "Angus El Cobarde"/"Angus the Coward"
15. "Noche En El Dia"/"The Darkened Day"
16. "El Caza Sombras"/"The Shadow Hunter"
17. "Acero Real"/"Royal Metal"
18. "Muerte Abajo, Vida Arriba"/"Down with Death! Long Live Life!"
19. "Odia Siniestra"/"Wicked Melody"
20. "Tres Venenos"/"Three Chalices of Poison"
21. "Dos Reyes Para Un Reino"/"Two Kings for a Kingdom"
22. "Hoces Arriba"/"Power to the Sickles"
23. "La Ultima Voluntad"/"The Last Wish"
24. "Sylvan, El Inseparable"/"Forever Together"
25. "Murmullo De Pensamientos"/"Whispering Thoughts"
26. "El sendero escrito"/"The Written Way"

== See also ==
- The Legend of Zelda
- Johan and Peewit
- Robin Hood (1973 film)
- Furrlough
