= Josep Vallverdú =

Catalan poet, novelist and playwright (1923–2026)

Josep Vallverdú i Aixalà
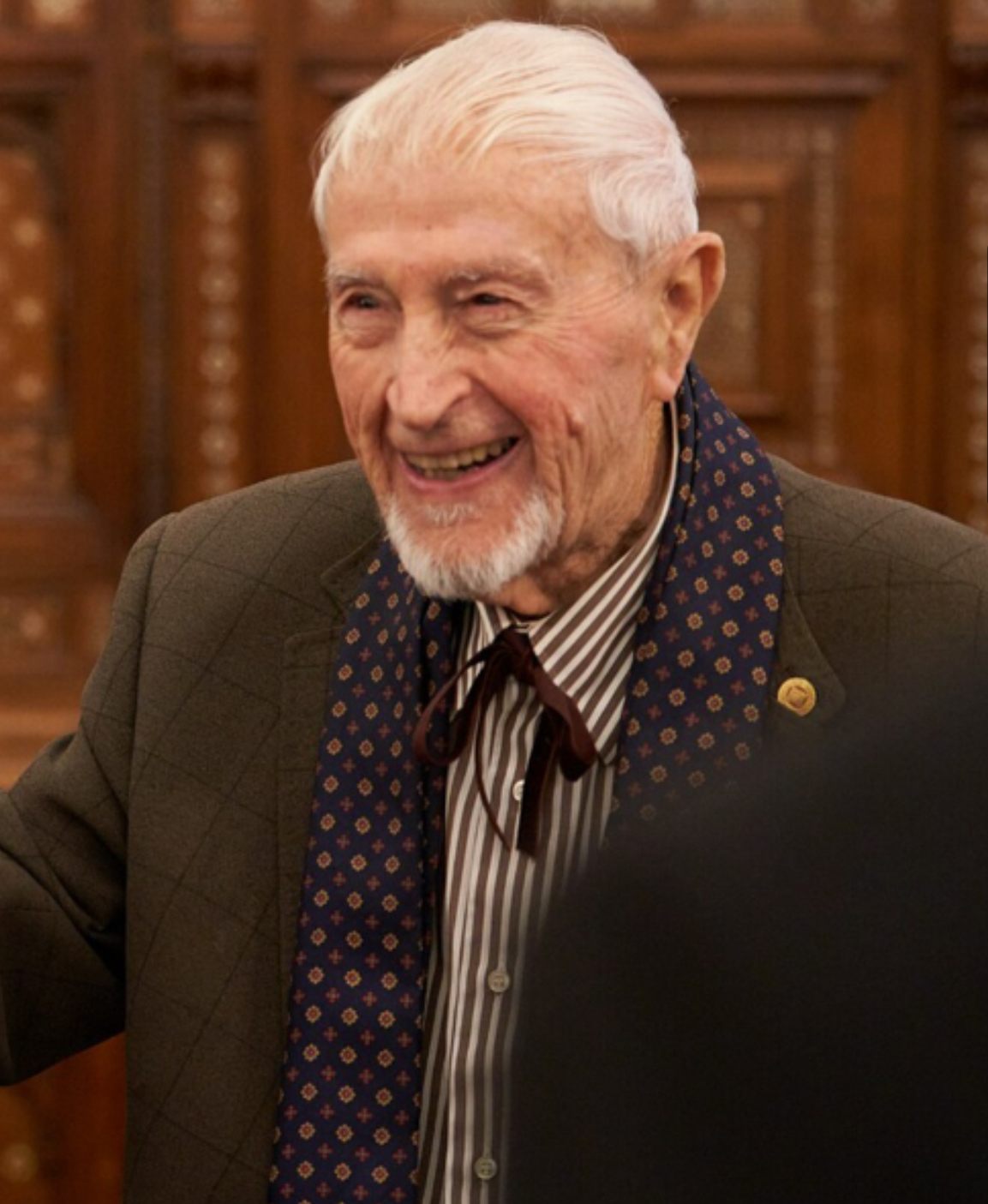
- Vallverdu in 2023
- Born: 9 July 1923; Lleida, Catalonia, Spain
- Died: 21 July 2026 (aged 103)
- Occupations: Poet, novelist, playwright, linguist, essayist
- Awards: National Prize for Children's Literature by the Spanish Ministry of Culture and Sport (1982)

Josep Vallverdú i Aixalà (Catalan pronunciation: [ʒuˈzɛb ˌbaʎβəɾˈðu]; 9 July 1923 – 21 July 2026) was a Catalan poet, novelist, playwright, linguist, and essayist. With a recognized career in children's and youth literature, he authored more than two hundred works.

== Life and career ==
Vallverdú was born in Lleida, Catalonia, Spain on 9 July 1923. Because of Franco's troops and bombings, the family left Lleida. They took refuge in Puiggròs and then in Sant Martí de Maldà. At the end of the Civil War, they returned to Lleida and a year later moved to Barcelona so he could study for his high school diploma. In 1945 he graduated in Philosophy and Letters from the University of Barcelona, specializing in classical philology.

For many years he worked as a high school professor. During that period, and from 1960, when he published his first novel El venedor de peixos, he devoted himself mainly to children's and youth fiction.

His book Rovelló, starring a puppy from a farmhouse who explores the world, won the Folch i Torres Prize in 1968 and was published in 1969. It has become a classic of Catalan children's literature and in 2025 reached its thirtieth edition. In 2025, on the day he turned one hundred and two, Vallverdú delivered the manuscript of El retorn de Rovelló to the La Galera publishing house, with new adventures of the little dog protagonist. The book has also been adapted as a television series in TV3 (Catalonia).

After his retirement in 1988, he devoted himself more to what he called "personal books", basically diaries, collections of press articles, travelogues and essays on his own work.

He also translated works by Jack London, Jean Piaget, Edgar Allan Poe, Gianni Rodari and Oscar Wilde into Catalan. Around thirty of his works have been translated into Spanish.

His works, rich in vocabulary, have been widely used in the Catalan classrooms.

His collection and archive was donated by him to the University of Lleida, and consists of more than 4,000 volumes, in addition to personal documentation and other objects, such as mentions and awards received.

Vallverdú died on 21 July 2026, at the age of 103, in Balaguer.

== Honours ==
In 2000 he received the Premi d'Honor de les Lletres Catalanes and in 2002 the Trajectòria Prize for his lifelong work. In 2004 he was awarded an honorary doctorate by the University of Lleida. In 1991 he was made a member of the Institut d'Estudis Catalans.

In 1988, the Catalan Government awarded him the Creu de Sant Jordi, and in 2019 the Gold Medal of the Generalitat of Catalonia "for his work as a narrator, poet, playwright, linguist, translator and essayist, especially in the world of children's literature".

The Lleida Council has been awarding the Josep Vallverdú Prize annually since 1984.

The celebration of the "Vallverdú Year", to commemorate the centenary of the writer, began in February 2023, with an institutional event at the Enric Granados Auditorium in Lleida. Over the year, more than two hundred activities were organized throughout Catalonia. In October 2023, the "Josep Vallverdú Symposium" took place at the University of Lleida. The proceedings of this symposium were published in the volume Amb ulls ben nets de por i polseguera. La contribució de Josep Vallverdú a literatura catalana, edited by Andreu Bosch i Rodoreda and Joan Ramon Veny-Mesquida (Pagès editors).

Vallverdú was awarded by the Ministry of Culture in 1982 the National Spanish Prize in Children's Literature.

== Works ==
=== Selected works for children and young readers ===
- Trampa sota les aigües, 1965
- Rovelló, 1969
- En Roc Drapaire, 1971
- L'home dels gats, 1972
- Un cavall contra Roma, 1975
- Saberut i Cua-Verd, National Spanish Prize in Children's Literature, 1982
- Indíbil i la boira, 1983
- L'home de gregal, 1992
