= List of radio stations in South Africa =

This is a list of radio stations in South Africa. M Note: The list of commercial stations tends to be more stable, with few additions or removals. The list of community stations tends to change quite a bit, with many changes over time (mainly due to funding issues).

== National / multiprovincial (commercial stations) ==
=== Active ===
These are the active radio stations in South Africa.

- 5FM – previously Radio 5
- CapeTalk
- Kfm 94.5
- 947 – previously 94.7 Highveld Stereo
- 99.2 YFM
- 2000FM (Radio 2000)
- Algoa FM (Radio Algoa)
- BRFM (The Border Drive)
- Capricorn FM
- Hot 1027, formerly Classic FM 102.7
- East Coast Radio (ECR)
- eRadio SA
- Gagasi FM
- Good Hope FM
- HartiesFM
- Heart 104.9 FM
- iKwekwezi FM – previously Radio Ndebele
- Jacaranda FM - previously Jakaranda Stereo
- Kaya FM 95.9
- Ligwalagwala FM
- Lesedi FM
- LM Radio 702 KHz MW
- Lotus FM
- Metro FM
- Motsweding FM
- MPowerFM
- Munghana Lonene FM
- OFM – previously Radio Oranje
- Phalaphala FM
- Power FM (Power 98.7 FM)
- Radio 702
- Radiokansel / Radio Pulpit 657 KHz MW
- RSG – previously Afrikaans Stereo, Radio Suid-Afrika (1985), Afrikaanse Diens van die SAUK (1937)
- SAfm – previously Radio South Africa (1985), English Service (1936)
- Smile 90.4FM
- Cybatar Tunes
- Thobela FM
- tru fm – previously CKI FM
- Ukhozi FM
- Umhlobo Wenene FM
- Vuma 103 FM
- YFM99.2
- Thetha FM
- VUTHA FM COMMERCIAL
- VUTHA FM NEWS
- EVRH Evogue Radio (Digital radio station)

=== Ceased ===
- Springbok Radio – owned by SABC; closed 31 December 1985
- Radio RSA – renamed Channel Africa

== Free State (community stations) ==
=== Active ===
- Koepel Stereo (KSFM 94.9)
- Kovsie FM 97.0
- Lentswe Community Radio
- Mosupatsela FM Stereo
- Motheo FM
- Overvaal Stereo
- QwaQwa Radio
- Radio Panorama 107.6 FM
- Radio Rosestad 100.6 FM
- Setsoto FM Stereo
- Central University of Technology Campus Radio (CUT FM 105.8FM)
- Dihlabeng FM

== Gauteng (community stations) ==
=== Active ===
- 90.6FM Stereo / VCR FM
- Hellenic Radio
- Hope FM
- IFM 102.2
- Jozi FM 105.8
- MIX FM 93.8
- Pretoria FM
- Tuks FM 107.2
- TUT FM 96.2
- UJFM 95.4
- Arrowline Chinese Radio AM 1269
- Radio Suid Afrika
- Impact Radio (103.0)

== KwaZulu-Natal (community stations) ==
=== Active ===
- DYR (Durban Youth Radio) 105.1 FM – reactivated as of April 2016
- Icora FM (Indonsakusa Community Radio)
- Life FM KZN NPC
- KZN Capital 104FM
- Ugu Youth Radio FM
- [ VOD RADIO ]
- [ FAITH ARMARIA ONLINE]

== Limpopo (community stations) ==
=== Active ===
- Giyani Community Radio
- Makhado FM 107.3
- Musina FM 104.0
- John Hagan Radio
- Turf Radio
- Mokopane FM 100.0MHz

== Mpumalanga (community stations) ==
=== Active ===
- Radio Laeveld 100.5FM Stereo
- Kamhlushwa Radio
- Ubuthebe FM Live

== Northern Cape (community stations) ==
=== Active ===
- Kurara FM
- Radio NFM 98.1
- Radio Orania
- Radio Riverside 98.2 FM
- Radio Teemaneng Stereo 89.1 FM
- Ulwazi FM 88.9
- X-K FM 107.9

== North West (community stations) ==
=== Active ===
- Aganang FM
- Letlhabile Community Radio
- Lichvaal Stereo (92.6FM)
- Life FM
- Mafikeng Community Radio 96.7
- Modiri FM
- PUK FM 93.6
- Radio Mafisa 93.4 FM
- Star FM
- Kopanong FM 100.0 and 103.5 MHz
- Radio Bop (formerly Radio Bophuthatswana)
- N14 District FM

== Western Cape (Cape Town radio stations) ==
=== Active ===
- 5FM - Frequency 89.0FM
- Bush Radio 89.5FM
- Bok Radio Brackenfell 98.9FM
- Smile 90.4FM
- Metro FM 93.0
- HelderbergFM 93.6
- Kfm 94.5
- Good Hope FM 95.3FM
- Lotus FM 97.8FM
- Radio 2000 98.6FM
- CCFM 107.5
- Heart 104.9FM
- Fine Music Radio
- MFM 92.6
- One FM 94.0
- Radio 786 100.4FM
- Radio Kaap se Punt
- 70vibeFM
- kaapstad FM
- The Voice of the Cape
- eRadio SA

=== Active ===
- SMYN Online Radio
- Massive Metro
- Homegrown Radio
- Cliff Central
- Urban Fusion Radio
- eRadio SA

== Border areas ==
- Botswana
- Eswatini – Eswatini Broadcasting and Information Service
- Lesotho
- Mozambique
- LM Radio
- Namibia
- Zimbabwe

== International ==
- 93.6 RAM FM
- Radio France Internationale – news, sport and features, across Africa

== See also ==
- List of newspapers in South Africa
- Media of South Africa
- Lists of radio stations in Africa
- Music of South Africa
- South African Audience Research Foundation (SAARF)
