= OpenView HD =

South African direct broadcast satellite TV provider

Openview
- OpenView logo used since 2018
- Formerly: OpenView HD (2013–2018)
- Type: Public
- Industry: Free-to-air television
- Founded: 15 October 2013; 12 years ago
- Headquarters: Cape Town, South Africa
- Area served: South Africa
- Products: Direct Broadcast Satellite; Internet Protocol television
- Services: Television
- Owners: eMedia Investments
- Website: www.openview.co.za

OpenView is a free-to-view direct broadcast satellite television provider in South Africa which is run by Platco Digital (part of the eMedia Group which includes free-to-air channel e.tv). It launched on 15 October 2013.

In addition to the "e" suite of networks, OpenView also carries the SABC networks, along with several domestic and international channels. It also carries nearly thirty audio-only radio stations.

In 2023, Openview launched Ultraview, which is the pay-tv service of Openview. It launched with 2 bouquets, SPICE and eDGE. SPICE focuses on Bollywood content and eDGE focuses on LGBTQ+ content.

As of 2023, OpenView is available in more than 3 million households.

== Channel list ==
Channel Name	Channel Number	Website
SABC 1	101	www.sabc1.co.za
SABC 2	102	www.sabc2.co.za
SABC 3	103	www.sabc3.co.za
e.tv	104	www.etv.co.za
eExtra	105	www.etv.co.za/tvguide/eextra
eMovies	106	www.etv.co.za/tvguide/emovies
eMovies Extra	107	www.etv.co.za/tvguide/emovies-extra
eReality	108	www.etv.co.za/tvguide/ereality
eSERIES	109	www.etv.co.za/tvguide/eseries
Star Life	110	
Zee One	111	www.zeeone.zeeafrica.tv
ePlesier	112	www.etv.co.za/tvguide/eplesier
The Home Channel +	113	www.thehomechannel.co.za
Star Khanya	114	
eXplore	115	
France24	121	www.france24.com
DBE TV	122	www.education.gov.za
SABC Sport	124	www.sabcsport.com
Sporty TV	125	www.sportytv.com
eToonz	130	www.etv.co.za/tvguide/etoonz
Mindset	134	www.mindset.africa
SA Music	135	www.samusic.tv

20 SABC Radio Stations

9 Privately Owned Radio Stations

Radio Stations Name	Radio Stations Number	Website
YFM	600	www.yfm.co.za
Jacaranda FM	602	www.jacarandafm.com
Gagasi 99.5 FM	603	gagasiworld.co.za
OFM	604	www.ofm.co.za
Heart 104.9 FM	605	www.heartfm.co.za
East Coast Radio	606	www.ecr.co.za
Radiokansel / Radio Pulpit	607	www.radiopulpit.co.za
Kaya FM	608	www.kaya959.co.za
Smile 90.4FM	609	smilefm.co.za
Metro FM	610	www.metrofm.co.za
5FM	611	www.5fm.co.za
Good Hope FM	612	www.goodhopefm.co.za
Radio 2000	613	www.radio2000.co.za
SAfm	614	www.safm.co.za
RSG	615	www.rsg.co.za
Lotus FM	616	www.lotusfm.co.za
Ukhozi FM	617	ukhozifm.co.za
UMhlobo Wenene FM	618	www.umhlobowenenefm.co.za
Lesedi FM	619	www.lesedifm.co.za
Ikwekwezi FM	620	www.ikwekwezifm.co.za
Thobela FM	621	www.thobelafm.co.za
Munghana Lonene FM	622	www.munghanalonenefm.co.za
Phalaphala FM	623	www.phalaphalafm.co.za
Motsweding FM	624	www.motswedingfm.co.za
Ligwalagwala FM	625	www.ligwalagwalafm.co.za
Tru fm	626	www.trufm.co.za
X-K FM 107.9	627	
Channel Africa	628	www.channelafrica.co.za
Algoa FM	637	algoafm.co.za

== History ==
The sister company of e.tv, Platco Digital, launched the Openview HD platform on 16 October 2013. The product came to the market during a time when South Africa's transition to digital terrestrial television was slowed down both due to political and corporate gridlock. In 2018, the system became known simply as OpenView.

== See also ==
- e.tv
- List of South African mass media
