= Media in Pretoria =

Radio and TV broadcasting in South Africa

Radio and TV broadcasting in Pretoria is supplied via a network of VHF/FM and UHF transmitters and repeaters owned and operated by Sentech - South Africa's state-owned broadcast signal distributor - from four transmitter sites in and around the city. A number of community radio stations operate transmitters from non-Sentech sites.

The inception of an FM broadcast service in South Africa, began on 1 September 1961 from what is now known as the Sentech Tower in Brixton, Johannesburg. The remainder of South Africa was initially served by medium wave transmitters, which were essentially localised to the larger centres. A massive drive through the 1960s and 70's saw the roll-out of the FM network to the rest of the country. Much of the original equipment supplied was through technology exchange programmes, meaning that the transmitters were of European design, but manufactured in South Africa. Original networks were based on 3 kW tube FM equipment, operating into channel combining equipment to allow the use of a common transmit antenna system, with a gain of around 10-12 dB. Sentech embarked on a huge programme in the late 1980s to effect replacement of these ageing FM transmitter and antenna systems. In world terms, it was the single largest contract awarded to a local manufacturer for the supply of FM transmitters.

In South Africa, digital migration still has to happen. Currently, analogue TV occupies the VHF frequencies where digital radio needs to migrate. Once digital migration is done, South Africa will have Digital Terrestrial Television (DTT) and listen to digital radio on the DAB system. For now, virtually all South Africans rely on analogue terrestrial (FM/AM/SW) broadcasts for their radio consumption.

== Pretoria-Gelukskroon Transmitting Station ==
Gelukskroon is the main broadcast site for Pretoria, situated west of the city close to the Hartebeespoort Dam. It is designed to beam signals down into the valley ("moot") formed by the Magaliesberg. Twelve radio and six TV services are broadcast from this site.

RADIO

- 87.90 MHz - SABC Thobela FM
- 89.30 MHz - SABC Ligwalagwala FM
- 91.00 MHz - SABC Motsweding FM
- 92.40 MHz - SABC Metro FM
- 94.20 MHz - Jacaranda 94.2
- 95.60 MHz - SABC Munghana Lonene FM
- 96.80 MHz - SABC Ikwekwezi FM
- 97.50 MHz - SABC Radio 2000
- 101.0 MHz - SABC Radio Sonder Grense
- 102.4 MHz - SABC Ukhozi FM
- 104.6 MHz - SABC SAfm
- 106.0 MHz - Talk Radio 702

DAB+ Terrestrial Frequency 239.200 MHz (13F)

- SABC 5FM
- SABC Radio 2000
- SABC Metro FM
- SABC SAfm
- SABC Radio Sonder Grense
- SABC Ukhozi FM
- Talk Radio 702
- 947 (radio station)
- East Coast Gold
- Ελληνική Ραδιοφωνία
- Fine Music Radio
- Hot 1027
- Radio Islam
- Jacaranda FM
- Kaya FM
- LM Radio
- Mix FM
- OFM
- Power FM
- Pretoria FM
- Radio Pulpit / Radiokansel
- Simply Smooth

TV

- 8n - SABC 1
- 5n - SABC 2
- 11 - SABC 3
- 21 - M-Net
- 25 - M-Net Community Services Network (CSN)
- 29n - e.tv

== Sunnyside-Lukasrand Transmitting Station ==
The Telkom Lukasrand Tower on Lukasrand, which dominates the Pretoria skyline, carries four radio services and TV repeaters.

RADIO

- 90.50 MHz - Grootfm
- 100.1 MHz - SABC Lotus FM
- 103.6 MHz - SABC 5 FM
- 107.2 MHz - Tuks FM

TV

- 63n - SABC 1
- 55n - SABC 2
- 59 - SABC 3
- 67 - M-Net
- 46 - M-Net CSN
- 38n - e.tv
- 27 - Tshwane TV

== Menlo Park Transmitting Station ==
This is a repeater station, designed as gap-filler for the eastern parts of Pretoria.

RADIO

- 90.5 MHz - GROOTfm 90.5
- 89.00 MHz - SABC Motsweding FM
- 93.60 MHz - SABC Ikwekwezi FM
- 95.30 MHz - Jacaranda 94.2
- 98.60 MHz - SABC Radio 2000
- 102.1 MHz - SABC Radio Sonder Grense
- 105.7 MHz - SABC SAfm

TV

- 57n - SABC 1
- 53n - SABC 2
- 65 - SABC 3
- 61 - M-Net
- 44 - M-Net CSN
- 48n - e.tv

== Pretoria North Transmitting Station ==
This is essentially a TV repeater station for the area north of the Magaliesberg.

RADIO

- 89.90 MHz - SABC 5 FM

TV

- 52n - SABC 1
- 40n - SABC 2
- 46 - SABC 3
- 50 - M-Net
- 56 - M-Net CSN (changed from 54 which is now DTT MUX1 Gauteng SFN)
- 37n - e.tv

All major transmitting stations in Pretoria are broadcasting DTT Multiplexes 1 and 2 on channel 54 and 58 as part of the Gauteng allotments in DVB-T2. The two trial bouquets include SABC channels, etv, Soweto TV, Tshwane TV, Mindset Health and Education, Lesotho TV and some encrypted DSTV channels.

== Community Radio Stations on non-Sentech sites ==
- 88.2 MHz - Poort FM 88.2 (Eersterust and surrounding areas within Tshwane)
- 90.50 MHz - Grootfm 90.5 (Tshwane)
- 92.80 MHz - Kangala Community Radio (Verena-Renosterkop)
- 93.00 MHz - Soshanguve Community Radio (Soshanguve)
- 93.60 MHz - Tshwane FM (Tshwane University of Technology-Pretoria West)
- 96.20 MHz - TUT FM (Tshwane University of Technology-Soshanguve)
- 103.0 MHz - Impact Radio (Magaliesberg)
- 104.2 MHz - Pretoria FM (Kleinfontein)
- 106.6 MHz - Moretele Community Radio (Babelegi-Hammanskraal)

== Medium wave (AM) and short wave radio stations ==
The following medium wave and short wave radio stations can also be heard in Pretoria. Some stations will be clearer at night. Short wave frequencies vary according to time of day. More information is at www.sentech.co.za.

MEDIUM WAVE (AM)

- 576 kHz - SABC Metro FM (Meyerton, Gauteng)
- 657 kHz - Radio Pulpit (Meyerton, Gauteng)
- 909 kHz - Voice of America (Moepeng Hill, Botswana)
- 1197 kHz - Family Radio (Lancers Gap, Maseru, Lesotho)
- 1440 kHz - Radio Pulpit (Kameeldrif) - DRM test transmissions started in 2014

SHORT WAVE (all at Meyerton, Gauteng)

- BBC World Service
- SABC Channel Africa
- SA Radio League
- Trans World Radio
- Family Radio

== Broadcasts from outside the city ==
Due to Pretoria's proximity to Johannesburg, most radio services broadcast from the 234m high Sentech Tower in Brixton, Johannesburg can also be heard in the southern parts of Pretoria (where the line of sight is not blocked by the Magaliesberg or ridges) These include:

- 88.40 MHz - SABC Lesedi FM
- 93.20 MHz - SABC Umhlobo Wenene FM
- 94.70 MHz - 94.7 Highveld Stereo
- 95.90 MHz - Kaya FM
- 99.20 MHz - Y-fm
- 102.7 MHz - Classic FM
- 107.8 MHz - SABC PhalaPhala FM

In certain areas of Pretoria (especially on hilltops) it is also possible to pick up radio stations transmitted from Sentech's sites at Thabazimbi, Limpopo and Middelburg, Mpumalanga.

== Private Radio Stations serving Pretoria or operating from Pretoria ==
- Pretoria FM - Kleinfontein Transmitter - 104.2 MHz (Bronkhorstspruit, East of Pretoria)
- Pretoria FM - Magaliesberg Transmitter - 106.6 MHz (Brits, West of Pretoria)
- Pretoria FM - Studio - Loftus Park Pretoria
- Radio Pulpit - Studio - Kilnerpark
- Grootfm - Studio - Lynnwood Manor

== Pretoria radio at a glance ==
Excluding the SA Radio League, there are 36 conventional (FM/AM/SW) radio stations available in Pretoria (including those broadcasting from Johannesburg).

- 15 are owned by the national public broadcaster, the SABC (13 PBS; 2 PCBS)
- 6 are privately owned commercial enterprises (only two private stations has transmitters in Pretoria - Jacaranda 94.2 and Talk Radio 702)
- 9 are single-transmitter community radio stations with limited reach
- 11 broadcast only in English
- 5 broadcast in Afrikaans or are bilingual (Afrikaans & English)
- 14 broadcast in vernacular African languages
- 12 have their studios situated in the Pretoria/Centurion area
- 3 are international news and current affairs services (external services)
- 3 are multilingual international Christian radio stations
