= Leanne Manas =

South African TV presenter at the SABC (born 1974)

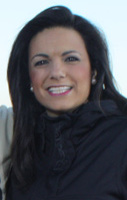
- Manas in 2012
- Born: 14 October 1974 (age 51); Johannesburg, South Africa
- Education: Rhodes University
- Occupations: Journalist; News presenter; TV presenter; UNHCR Goodwill Ambassador
- Years active: 2001–present
- Notable work: Morning Live
- Spouse: Marc Menelaou (m. 2005)
- Children: 2

Leanne Manas (/ˈmɑːnəs/ MAH-nəs; born 14 October 1974) is a South African television presenter, businesswoman and journalist. She is best known as the anchor of the South African Broadcasting Corporation's flagship morning programme Morning Live, a position she has held since 2004. In addition to her broadcasting career, she serves as a Goodwill Ambassador for the United Nations High Commissioner for Refugees, and is active in humanitarian and social impact initiatives.

In 2022, Manas was awarded the French National Order of Merit, specifically Chevalier de l’Ordre national du Mérite, by the French government in recognition of her contribution to journalism, media, and charitable projects. The following year she received the SA Style Award in the Media category, the Charlotte Mannya Maxeke Institute's "Bring Her Up" Award for Excellence in Social Impact, and was named Glamour Magazine's Icon Woman of the Year.

== Education ==
Manas holds a BA Honours degree in English and Communications and a Diploma in Speech and Drama teaching from Trinity College London. She later completed a Postgraduate certificate in Economics Journalism at Rhodes University.

== Career ==
Manas began her broadcasting career in 2001 as a news anchor for the business channel Summit TV. She went on to host SABC 3's Business Update and Business Focus before joining Morning Live on SABC 2 in August 2004. She has remained the show's main presenter since then.

In addition to her television work, Manas has presented on several South African radio stations, including Algoa FM, Jacaranda FM, Radio 702, SAfm and East Coast Radio. She is also active as a public speaker, MC and corporate trainer.

In January 2019, she was named a UNHCR Goodwill Ambassador. As part of this role, she has reported from refugee camps in Kenya and Malawi, hosted the Nansen Refugee Award ceremony in Geneva, and supported fundraising and awareness initiatives for displaced communities.
