= SABC =

State-owned public broadcaster in South Africa

South African Broadcasting Corporation
- Logo used since 2003

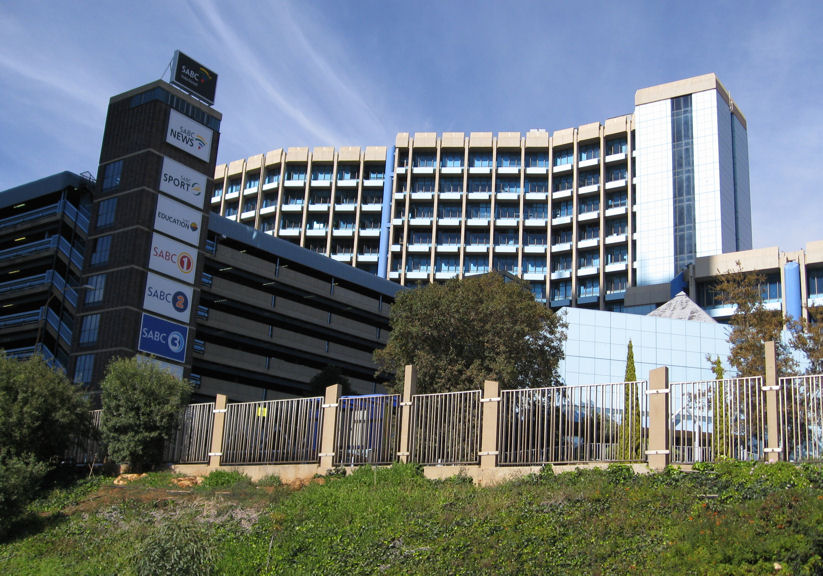
- SABC headquarters in Uitsaaisentrum, Johannesburg
- Type: Terrestrial television and radio network
- Country: South Africa
- Availability: South Africa Also reachable in nearby countries: Botswana; Eswatini; Lesotho; Mozambique; Namibia; Zimbabwe
- Founded: 1 August 1936; 90 years ago by the Government of South Africa
- Motto: Vuka Sizwe ("Nation Arise") "Everywhere For Everyone, Always"
- Revenue: ▲R 5.1 billion (2024)
- Net income: ▼−R 198 million
- Headquarters: Johannesburg, South Africa
- Broadcast area: South Africa
- Owner: Government of South Africa
- Key people: Khathutshelo Mike Ramukumba (chairman); Nomsa Chabeli (CEO)
- Launch date: 1936 (radio); 1976 (television)
- Television: SABC 1; SABC 2; SABC 3; SABC NEWS; SABC LEHAE; SABC Education; SABC Children; SABC Sport; SABC Encore
- Radio: 19 radio stations
- Official website: www.sabc.co.za/sabc/

The South African Broadcasting Corporation (SABC; Afrikaans: Suid-Afrikaanse Uitsaaikorporasie, SAUK) (Note: Though both Suid-Afrikaanse Uitsaaikorporasie and SAUK are no longer used even in Afrikaans broadcasts) is the public broadcaster in South Africa, and provides 19 radio stations (AM/FM) as well as six television broadcasts and three OTT Services to the general public. It is one of the largest of South Africa's state-owned enterprises and the biggest state broadcaster in Africa.

Opposition politicians and civil society often criticise the SABC, accusing it of being a mouthpiece for whichever political party is in majority power, thus currently the ruling African National Congress; during the apartheid era it was accused of playing the same role for the National Party government.

== Company history ==
=== Early years ===
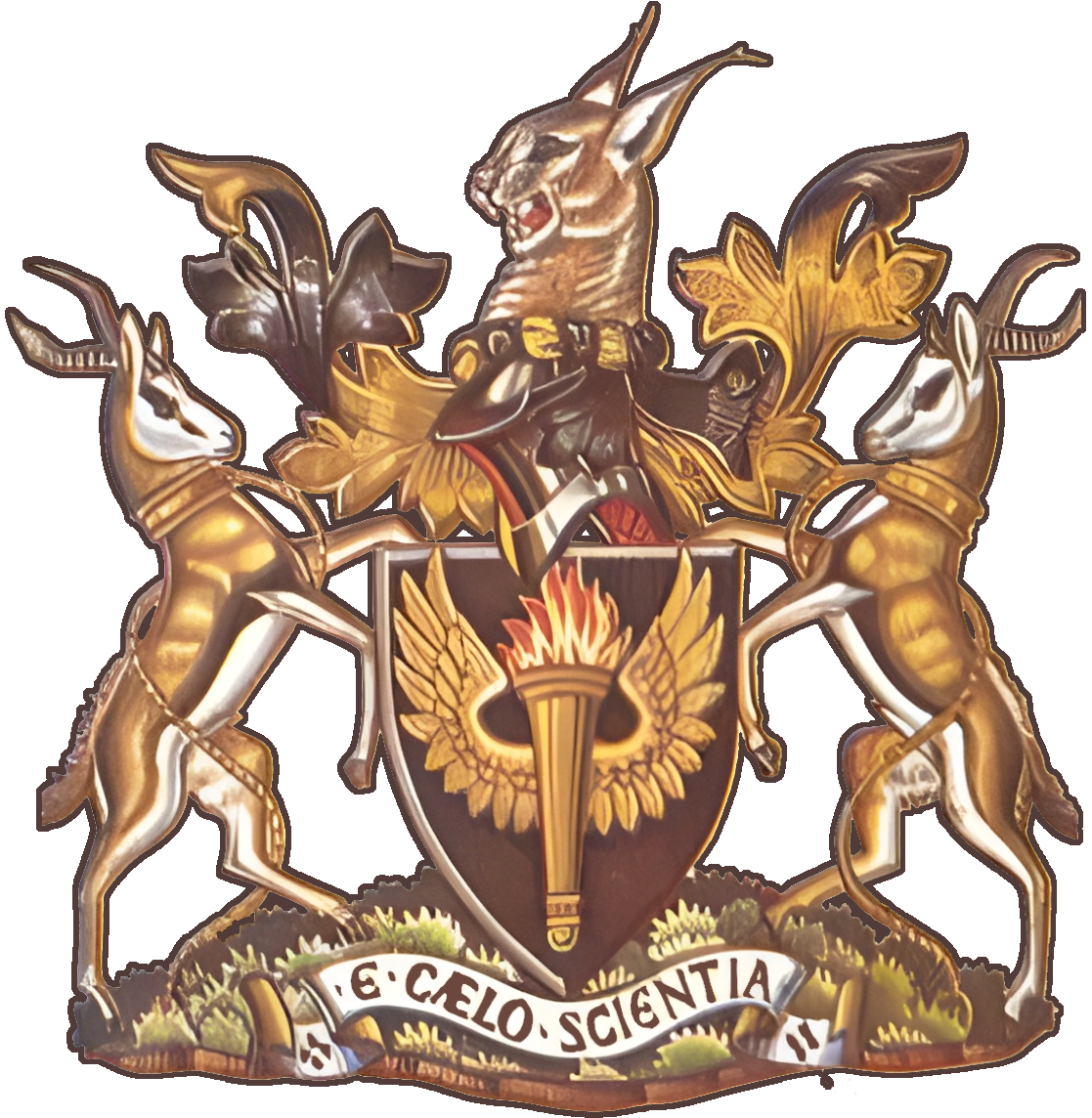
Corporate arms of the South African Broadcasting Corporation (1958–1994)

Radio broadcasting in South Africa began in 1923, under the auspices of South African Railways, before three radio services were licensed: the Association of Scientific and Technical Societies (AS&TS) in Johannesburg, the Cape Peninsular Publicity Association in Cape Town and the Durban Corporation, which began broadcasting in 1924.

These merged into the African Broadcasting Company in 1927, owned by I. W. Schlesinger, a wealthy businessman, but on 1 August 1936, they were sold to the SABC, established that year through an Act of Parliament. The SABC took over the African Broadcasting Company's staff and assets. It maintained a state monopoly on radio until the launch in December 1979 of Capital Radio 604, then Radio 702 in 1980. Although the subscription-funded television service M-Net launched in 1986, the SABC had a monopoly on free-to-air television until the launch of e.tv in 1998.

During National Party rule from 1948, it came under increasing accusations of being biased towards the ruling party. At one time most of its senior management were members of the Broederbond, the Afrikaner secret society, and later from institutions like Stellenbosch University.

The SABC was a radio service until the introduction of television in 1976. There were three main SABC radio stations: the English Service (later known as Radio South Africa), the Afrikaans Service (later known as Radio Suid-Afrika and Afrikaans Stereo) and the commercial station, Springbok Radio.

Programmes on the English and Afrikaans services mainly consisted of news; plays such as The Forsyte Saga, Story of an African Farm, and The Summons, written and produced in South Africa; serious talk shows; BBC radio shows; children's programmes, such as Sound Box; and light music featuring South African orchestras, arrangers, musicians and singers. Accomplished musicians such as pianist and composer Charles Segal featured on all three stations regularly in shows like Piano Playtime. Accordionist Nico Carstens was a regular on the Afrikaans programmes.

=== Recent history ===
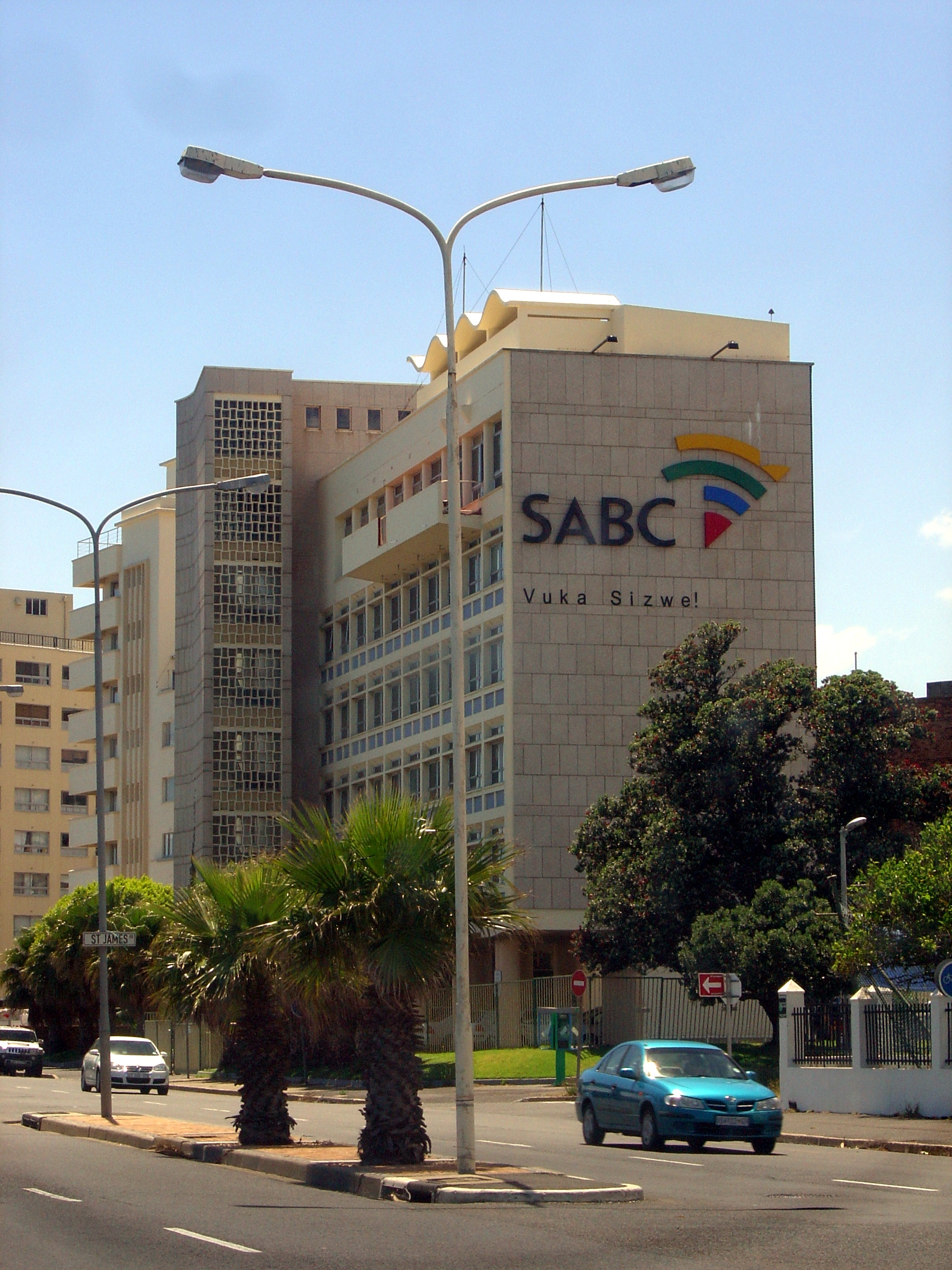
SABC offices in Sea Point, Cape Town

An IBA report on the state of the broadcasting industry in South Africa was released on 29 August 1995. Recommendations were given for the SABC to lose one of its three television channels, with the network being used for private television, demanding the creation of two or three private networks. The broadcaster would be restructured, and Sentech would be separated. Other recommendations included the sale of seven radio stations, while being granted eleven radio stations, nine of which in individual Bantu languages, provisions of an hour a day of regional programming windows on television and radio, at an estimated cost of 262 million rand/year, reintroduction of a third channel but on satellite television and the provision of an "education and information driven service" to the subcontinental region.

All of the channels were set to be rebranded by March 1996, in line with a restructuring that began in the 1993 CODESA talks. Preliminary changes were set to take place in 1993, but were delayed after the elections in April 1994.

In November 1995, Africa Monitor reported that the SABC was in talks with Channel 4 to deliver its television channels by satellite, to cover the entire population. Up until then, it was believed that a quarter of the national population received at least one of the three channels. By January 1996 a fourth channel carrying Channel 4's programmes was set to begin, and would convert to digital in July 1996, with the aim of creating an eight-channel pay-TV service.

At the end of 1995, the SABC lost its contract with Sky News. Footage on news bulletins broadcast by the corporation's television channels was now supplied by BBC World.

On 4 February 1996, two years after the ANC came to power, the SABC reorganised its three TV channels, so as to be more representative of different language groups. The repositioning of the networks gave the SABC's television service the chance to be "the new voice and the new vision of the rainbow nation". Under the new structure, SABC TV was compared to a "tower of Babel" regarding SABC 1 and SABC 2's programming structure, in the eleven official languages, while SABC 3 was all in English. The relaunch party was also heavily criticised by some, such as Angela Van Schalkwyk, who mentioned that an American face presented the new television offer. This resulted in the downgrading of Afrikaans by reducing its airtime from 50% to 15%, a move that alienated many Afrikaans speakers. Starting July 1997, the corporation was commercialised.

In late 1998, the SABC finally started broadcasting its channels on DStv, per an agreement with Sentech to convert its channels to digital. The agreement encompassed its three national terrestrial networks, Bop TV and its thirteen radio stations, with the hopes of starting two pan-continental television networks, an entertainment channel and a news channel.

The launch of e.tv prompted the SABC to restructure its three television channels in late September 1998. The strategies were due to e.tv's promise that the service would be a "full-spectrum" channel as opposed to the niche programming of both the SABC and M-Net. SABC 1 repositioned itself as an entertainment channel for South African youth and young adults, SABC 2 would carry content related to educational and social issues from the rest of Africa to South African audiences, SABC 3 concentrated on a mix of news, current affairs and entertainment. Two satellite channels, available on DStv, opened on 16 November 1998, SABC Africa and Best of Africa (later renamed Africa2Africa).

In line with its ambitions to be "the pulse of Africa's creative spirit" (SABC's tagline at the turn of the millennium), the SABC opened up to protocols and co-operation agreements with partners such as URTNA, FRU and the Television Trust for the Environment, eyeing in at the rest of Africa.

On 8 August 2003, the SABC unveiled its current logo, coinciding with the Your SABC campaign, which was unveiled on its three television channels at 7:30pm that day. Simultaneously, the Topsport brand was ditched in favour of SABC Sport.

The SABC has since been accused of favouring the ruling ANC party, mostly in news. It remains dominant in the broadcast media.

Criticism intensified around 2003–2005, when it was accused of a wide range of shortcomings including self-censorship, lack of objectivity and selective news coverage.

On 20 October 2020, SABC and the government were in discussion to get TV and streaming providers in South Africa to collect TV licence on their behalf.

On 27 March 2021, SABC and eMedia Investments expanded their partnership which allowed OpenView customers to receive 3 additional channels as well as their 19 radio stations.

=== Leaders ===
Director General of the SABC:

Surname	Name	From	To
Caprara	René Silvio	1936	1948
Roos	Gideon Daniel	1948	1959
Meyer	Pieter Johannes	1959	1980
De Villiers	Steve	1980	1983
Eksteen	Riaan	1983	1988
Harmse	Wynand	1988	1994

Chairman of the SABC Board:

Surname	Name	From	To
Matsepe-Casaburri	Ivy Florence	1994	1996
Zulu	Paulus	1996	2000
Maphai	Thabane Vincent	2000	2003
Funde	Sonwabo Eddie	2003	2008
Mkhonza	Khanyi	2008	2009
Charnley	Irene	2009	2009
Ngubane	Baldwin Sipho	2010	2013
Tshabalala	Zandile Ellen	2013	2014
Maguvhe	Mbulaheni Obert	2014	2017
Makhathini	Bongumusa Emmanuel	2017	2022
Ramukumba	Khathutshelo Mike	2023	

== CEOs ==
Chief executive officers of the SABC
Term	Name
1994–1998	Sisulu, Z.
1998–2000	Mbatha, H.
2000	Khuzwayo, C.
2000-2005	Matlare, P.
2002–2008	Mpofu, D.
2008–2009	Mampone, G.
2009–2011	Mokoetle, S.
2011–2014	Mokhobo, L.
2014–2015	Motsoeneng, H.
2015	Matlala, F.
2015–2016	Matthews, J.
2017–2023	Mxakwe, M.
2023–present	Chabeli, N.

== Radio ==
=== Establishment ===
Following its establishment in 1936, the SABC established services in what were then the country's official languages, English and Afrikaans, with the Afrikaans service being established in 1937. Broadcasts in languages such as Zulu, Xhosa, Sesotho and Tswana followed in 1940.

=== Springbok Radio ===
Springbok Radio, the SABC's first commercial radio service, started broadcasting on 1 May 1950. Bilingual in English and Afrikaans, it broadcast from the Johannesburg Centre for 113 1/2 hours a week. The service proved to be so popular with advertisers that at the time of its launch, commercial time had been booked well in advance.

The station featured a wide variety of programming, such as morning talk and news, game shows, soap operas like Basis Bravo, children's programming, music request programmes, top-ten music, talent shows and other musical entertainment. One popular Saturday noontime comedy show was Telefun Time, whose hosts would phone various people and conjure up situation comedy, a similar brand of humour to the films of Leon Schuster.

By 1985, Springbok Radio was operating at a heavy loss. After losing many listeners with the handing over of its shortwave frequencies to Radio 5 and facing competition from television, it ceased broadcasting on 31 December 1985.

=== SABC News Service ===
The News Service was established in June 1950, replacing the programmes of the BBC. Although this was because the BBC broadcasts were seen as giving a British viewpoint of current affairs, there were also concerns that the SABC service would become overly pro-government, or "Our Master's Voice". By 1968, it had over 100 full-time reporters in the main cities and local correspondents all over the country, with overseas news provided by Reuters, AFP, AP and UPI. There was a News Film Unit which, prior to television in 1976, produced films for news agencies and television organisations.

=== SABC Symphony Orchestra ===
The SABC Symphony Orchestra has its origins in its three studio ensembles in Johannesburg, Durban and Cape Town and the Municipal Orchestra of the Johannesburg City Council. When the SABC centralised its broadcasting in Johannesburg, the future of the three ensembles were in doubt but at the same time, the Municipal Orchestra of the Johannesburg City Council had been disbanded. The SABC was able to form an orchestra of 80 musicians from these groupings in 1954, and while its main base was at the Johannesburg City Hall, it would tour the country. The orchestra would be led for many years by the SABC's head of music, Anton Hartman, but had other conductors as well, such as Francesco Mander and Edgar Cree. There were also international composers such as Igor Stravinsky. The SABC Junior Orchestra was also created and began in February 1966 under Walter Mony.

=== Regional radio ===
Regional commercial FM music stations were started in the 1960s.

Station	Launch date	Replaced by
Radio Highveld	1964	947
Radio Good Hope	1965	Good Hope FM
Radio Port Natal	1967	East Coast Radio
Radio Jacaranda	1986	Jacaranda FM
Radio Oranje	1986	OFM
Radio Algoa	1986	Algoa FM

=== Popular music ===
Following the establishment of a republic and withdrawal from the Commonwealth in 1961, the Afrikaners' goal was to promote their culture and so, at first, the SABC's choice of popular music reflected the National Party government's initial conservatism, especially on the Afrikaans channel, with musicians such as Nico Carstens. However Carstens was also ostracised by the SABC, as his music was influenced by the Coloured and Malay communities of Cape Town.

Eventually, musicians broke through the barrier, when the young, English-speaking Jewish musician and composer, Charles Segal collaborated with the older Afrikaans lyric-writer, Anton Dewaal, to write songs. Segal's songs like "Die Ou Kalahari" became highly popular with the Afrikaans-speaking public. However, there was tight censorship over all broadcasts, particularly of pop music, with, for example, the music of the Beatles being banned by the SABC between 1966 and March 1971.

In 1966 the SABC established an external service, known as Radio RSA, which broadcast in English, Swahili, French, Portuguese, Dutch and German. In 1969 the SABC held a national contest to find theme music for the service. This contest was won by the popular South African pianist and composer, Charles Segal and co-writer, Dorothy Arenson. Their composition, "Carousel" remained the theme song for Radio RSA until 1992, when it was replaced by Channel Africa.

In 1986, the SABC ran a competition to promote South African music. Each of the 15 radio stations, represented by an artist, entered a song to compete for the Song for South Africa in the National Song Festival. The finals were broadcast live on television. The Radio Port Natal submission won the competition with the Don Clarke song, Sanbonani, performed by P J Powers and Hotline.

SABC compiled the album sales chart from the end of 1981 to 1995, and the singles sales chart from 1958 to 1989 when singles stopped being manufactured.

=== 1996 restructuring ===
In 1996 the SABC carried out a significant restructuring of their services. The main English-language radio service became SAfm. The new service, after some initial faltering, soon developed a respectable listenership and was regarded as a flagship for the new democracy. However, government interference in the state broadcaster in 2003 saw further changes to SAfm which reversed the growth and put it in rapid decline once more. Today it attracts only 0.6% of the total population to its broadcasts. The main Afrikaans radio service was renamed Radio Sonder Grense (literally 'Radio Without Borders') in 1995 and has enjoyed greater success with the transition.

By contrast, SABC Radio's competitors, like Primedia-owned Radio 702, Cape Talk and 94.7 Highveld Stereo have grown steadily in audience and revenue, while other stations such as the black-owned and focused YFM and Kaya FM have also attracted black audiences.

=== Programming policy ===
As of 12 May 2016, the SABC has implemented a policy to promote local content. 90% of all music played on the broadcaster's 18 radio stations will be sourced from local artists with a focus on kwaito, jazz, reggae and gospel genres.

=== Station list ===
Station	Language	Former name(s)	Launch date	Website	Webcast
SAfm	English	"A" Service; Radio South Africa	1936	www.safm.co.za	
5FM	English	Springbok Radio	1975	www.5fm.co.za	
Metro FM	English	Radio Metro	1986	www.metrofm.co.za	
Radio 2000	English	Radio South Africa	1986	www.radio2000.co.za	
Good Hope FM	English and Afrikaans	Radio Good Hope	1965	www.goodhopefm.co.za	
RSG	Afrikaans	"B" Service; Radio Suid-Afrika; Afrikaans Stereo	1937	www.rsg.co.za	
Ukhozi FM	Zulu	Radio Zulu	1960	www.ukhozifm.co.za	
Umhlobo Wenene FM	Xhosa	Radio Xhosa (& Radio Transkei)	1960	www.uwfm.co.za	
Lesedi FM	Southern Sotho	Radio Sesotho	1960	www.lesedifm.co.za	
Thobela FM	Northern Sotho	Radio Lebowa	1960	www.thobelafm.co.za	
Motsweding FM	Tswana	Radio Setswana (& Radio Mmabatho)	1962	www.motswedingfm.co.za	
Phalaphala FM	Venda	Radio Venda (& Radio Thohoyandou)	1965	www.phalaphalafm.co.za	
Munghana Lonene FM	Tsonga	Radio XiTsonga	1965	www.munghanalonenefm.co.za	
Ligwalagwala FM	Swazi	Radio Swazi	1982	www.ligwalagwalafm.co.za	
iKwekwezi FM	Ndebele	Radio Ndebele	1983	www.ikwekwezifm.co.za	
tru fm	English and Xhosa	Radio Ciskei; CKI FM	1983	www.trufm.co.za	
Lotus FM	English and Hindi (for the Indian community)	Radio Lotus	1983	www.lotusfm.co.za	
X-K FM	!Xu and Khwe		2000		

== Television ==
=== Early history (1975–1995) ===
SABC logo, used from 1976 to 1996

In 1975, after years of controversy over the introduction of television, the SABC was finally allowed to introduce a colour TV service, which began experimental broadcasts in the main cities on 5 May 1975, before the service went nationwide on 6 January 1976. Initially, the TV service was funded entirely through a licence fee just like the UK, but began advertising in 1978. The SABC (both Television and Radio) is still partly funded by the licence fee (currently R250 a year).

The service initially broadcast only in English and Afrikaans, with an emphasis on religious programming on Sundays. A local soap opera, The Villagers, set on a gold mine, was well received while other local productions like The Dingleys were panned as amateurish.

The majority of acquired programming on South African television came from the United States, although owing to their opposition to apartheid, some production companies stopped selling programmes to the country. The British actors' union Equity had already started a boycott of programme sales to South Africa, which was not lifted until 1993. However, the Thames Television police drama series The Sweeney and Van der Valk, were briefly shown on SABC TV, as was the original version of Thunderbirds.

Many imported programmes were dubbed into Afrikaans and other indigenous languages, but in 1985, in order to accommodate English speakers, the SABC began to simulcast the original-language audio of series on an FM radio service called Radio 2000, allowing viewers to watch them in the original language; the first English-language series to be simulcast was Miami Vice.

SABC TV also produced lavish musical shows featuring the most popular South African composers, solo musicians, bands and orchestras. For example, the pianist and composer, Charles Segal, was given a half-hour special show: The Music of Charles Segal, where a selection of his music was performed by various local artists, such as Zane Adams, SABC Orchestra and others. However, it also broadcast pop music series like Pop Shop, which consisted of overseas and local music, and Double Track, which consisted entirely of local acts.

With a limited budget, early programming aimed at children tended to be quite innovative, and programmes such as the Afrikaans-language puppet shows Haas Das se Nuus Kas and Oscar in Asblikfontein are still fondly remembered by many.

On 1 January 1981, two services were introduced, TV2 broadcasting in Zulu and Xhosa and TV3 broadcasting in Sotho and Tswana, both targeted at a black urban audience. The main channel, then called TV1, was divided evenly between English and Afrikaans, as before. In 1986, a new service called TV4 was introduced, carrying sports and entertainment programming, taking over the frequencies used by TV2 and TV3, which then had to end broadcasting at 21:00.

In 1991, TV2, TV3 and TV4 were combined into a new service called CCV (Contemporary Community Values). A third channel was introduced known as TSS, or Topsport Surplus Sport, Topsport being the brand name for the SABC's sport coverage, but this was replaced by NNTV (National Network TV), an educational, non-commercial channel, in 1993.

=== Competition and restructuring ===
In 1986, the SABC's monopoly on the television industry was challenged by the launch of a subscription-based service known as M-Net, which was backed by a consortium of newspaper publishers. This service was prohibited from broadcasting its own news programmes, which were still the preserve of the SABC. Direct-to-home satellite television in South Africa began when M-Net's parent company, Multichoice, launched its first-in-the-world digital satellite TV service, DStv, in 1995. At the time, SABC TV channels, were not broadcast on this network, but agreements were later reached that allowed DStv to carry the SABC channels as well. In 1998, the SABC's dominance of free-to-air terrestrial television was further eroded by the launch of the first free-to-air private TV channel, e.tv.

In 1996, the SABC reorganised its three TV channels with the aim of making them more representative of the various cultural groups. These new channels were called SABC 1, SABC 2 and SABC 3. The SABC also absorbed the Bop TV channel of the former Bophuthatswana bantustan. Between 1996 and 1998, the SABC had a satellite television service called AstraSat, which operated two channels, AstraSport and AstraPlus. Technological problems and advertising losses led to the scrapping of the service.

SABC TV programmes in Afrikaans and other languages are now subtitled in English, but programmes in English are not usually subtitled in other languages, the perception being that all South Africans can understand English. Previously, subtitling was confined to productions like operas and operettas. It was not used on TV1, on the assumption that most viewers understood both Afrikaans and English, nor on CCV, despite presenters using two or more different languages during a single programme.

=== New services ===
In 2005, the SABC announced proposed the creation of two complementary regional television channels, SABC4 and SABC5, to emphasise indigenous languages. SABC4, based in Mafikeng, was to be broadcast in Tswana, Sesotho, Pedi, Tsonga, Venda, and Afrikaans, to the northern provinces of the country, while SABC5, based in Cape Town, was to broadcast in Xhosa, Zulu, Ndebele, and Swazi, as well as Afrikaans, to the southern provinces. Unlike other SABC TV services, SABC4 and SABC5 were not to be available via satellite. Apart from soundbites on news or current affairs programmes, no English-language programming would be shown on either channel. However, the plans fell through and in 2015, the SABC stated that it would launch two new channels, SABC News and SABC Encore.

In 2013, the SABC announced plans to launch a new news channel, SABC News, to be available on DStv, instead of waiting for the introduction of digital terrestrial television.

In 2015, SABC partnered up with online TV platform Tuluntulu to launch two more channels which were SABC Education and SABC Children.

According to the SABC, the factors which are considered when deciding how much time a language gets on television are the following: how many home language speakers exist in the coverage area of a channel; the geographical spread of the language; the extent to which members of a language community are able to understand other languages; the extent of marginalisation of a language; the extent to which the language is understood by other South Africans; and whether there is available content that uses the language. SABC currently plans to launch five channels, the four of them being language-targeted:

- A channel targeting Tswana, Pedi and Sotho speakers
- A channel targeting Zulu, Xhosa, Swazi and Ndebele speakers
- A channel targeting Tsonga and Venda speakers
- A channel targeting Afrikaans speakers
- A SABC sports channel

SABC TV has an audience of over 30 million. SABC1 reaches 89% of the public, SABC2 reaches 91% of the public, and SABC3 reaches 77% of the public, according to the broadcaster. The SABC has 18 radio stations, which have more than 25 million weekly listeners.

In 2018, SABC scrapped part of the plans from 2015 and downsized their DTT plans from 18 TV channels to just 9 TV channels due to financial woes. The SABC have SABC 1-3 and News falling under the 9 channels with the rest being:

- A sports channel
- A health channel
- A history channel
- A parliamentary channel
- An education channel

These cahnnels required funding to materialize. teeveetee.blogspot.com as one credible source clarifies that these channels will heavily rely on external partnerships to create their content. In 2018, the group executive Nomsa Philiso at the SABC mentioned that if they get the sports channel running in SD, they may get to run a ninth channel which is history. as of November 2026, only Sports channel, Parlimentry Channel & Education channel are aired, while the Health channel & History channel are yet to be materialized.

On 4 May 2020 amidst the coronavirus outbreak, the SABC launched its educational channel called SABC Education through DTT and YouTube with additional platforms added soon.

SABC Encore shut down from the end of May apparently MultiChoice and SABC agreement for the channel ended back in 2018 giving the channel a 2-year open window. The SABC said they were exploring other the idea of continuing the channel through another platform.

In November 2020, SABC signed a channel and radio distribution agreement with Telkom for their new streaming service. They also launched their own catch-up and video on demand streaming service called SABC Plus on 17 November 2022, similar to BBC iPlayer, following two years of announcements.

== Reception outside South Africa ==
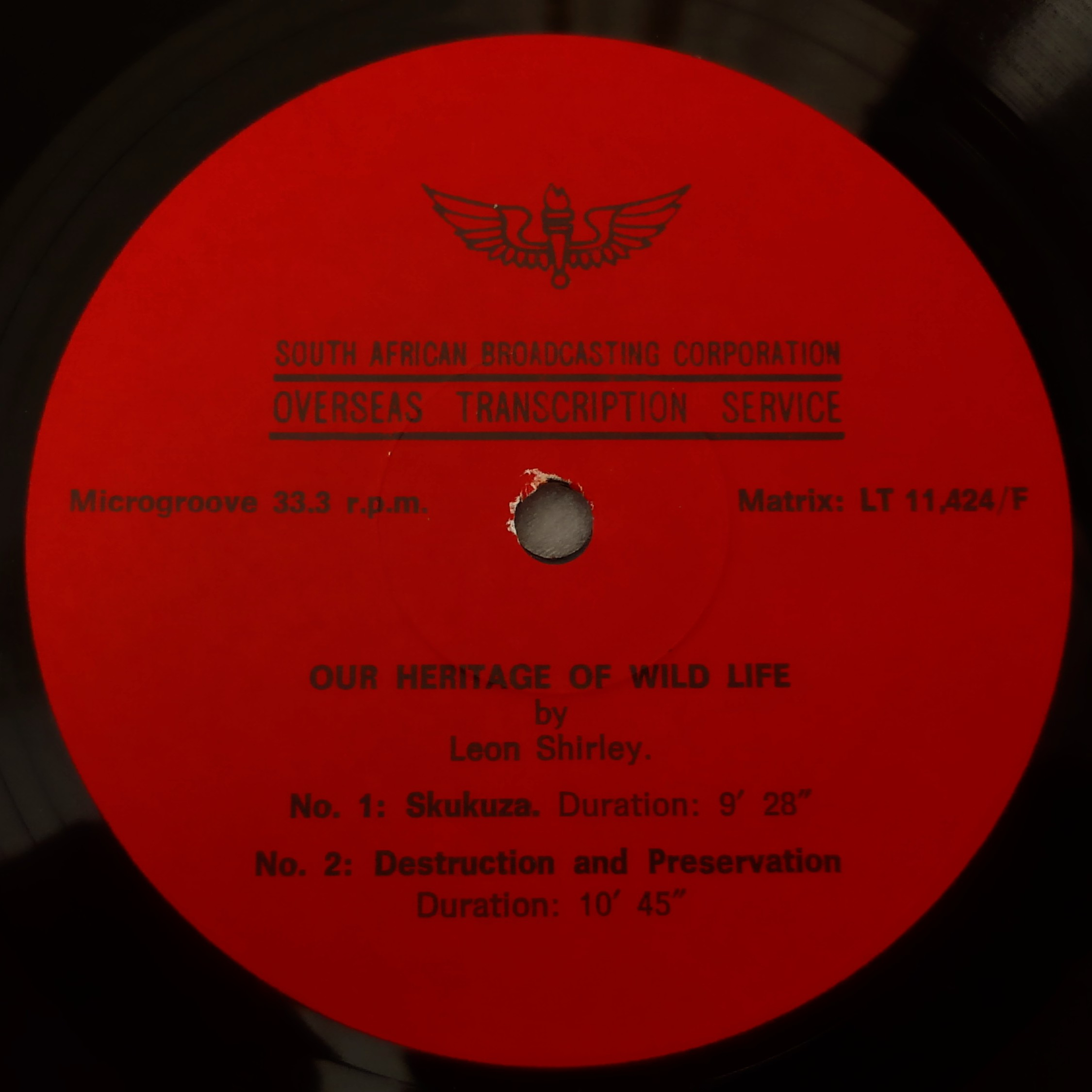
1970s SABC record for overseas transcription services.

=== Botswana, Lesotho and Eswatini ===
SABC television via satellite had also been widely available in neighbouring Lesotho and Eswatini, as well as Botswana. During the AstraSat period, SABC 1 and SABC 3 had more audience than Swazi TV, as locals believed the service to be biased and underdeveloped. When the shutdown of AstraSat signals began on 11 September 2000 with SABC 3, the audience was deprived of its access, revealing the limitations of the Swazi media structure. After complaints from rights holders in Botswana, SABC encrypted its TV channels, thereby cutting off viewers in those countries.

=== Namibia ===
Until 1979, the SABC operated broadcasting services in Namibia, which was then under South African rule, but in that year, these were transferred to the South West African Broadcasting Corporation (SWABC). However, the SWABC retained technical personnel from the SABC, and a number of its programmes were prepared at the SABC's studios in Johannesburg before being dispatched to Windhoek for transmission.

The SABC also helped the SWABC to establish a television service in 1981. This comprised a mix of programming in English, Afrikaans and German, 90 per cent of which came from or via the SABC. Programmes were shown locally a week after South Africa. The SWABC received SABC TV programming (which it recorded, edited and rebroadcast) first by using a microwave link, and later via an Intelsat satellite link. The SWABC became the Namibian Broadcasting Corporation (NBC) after the country's independence in 1990.

However, Walvis Bay, an enclave of South Africa in Namibia until 1994, received the SABC's TV1 on a low-power repeater, which was broadcast live via Intelsat from 1986.

=== Mozambique ===
When Televisão de Moçambique (at the time Televisão Experimental de Moçambique) was in its infancy, and it operated on a single transmitter in Maputo, it was reported that, in 1987, officials of said country's ruling party FRELIMO were reported to tune in to stronger SABC TV signals, coming from Johannesburg. At the time, the lone TVE Moçambique transmitter had weak power.

The cable company TVCabo (Visabeira) offered SABC1, SABC3 and Bop TV in its first few years of operation. These alongside e.tv were removed due to rights issues, in a situation similar to what would happen in Botswana ten years later, being replaced by other channels from the DStv bouquet, in August 2003, causing uproar from subscribers.

== International services ==
In 1998, the SABC began to broadcast two TV channels to the rest of Africa: SABC Africa, a news service, and Africa 2 Africa, entertainment programming from South Africa and other African countries, via DStv. In 2003, Africa 2 Africa was merged with SABC Africa to create a hybrid service, drawing programming from both sources. SABC Africa closed in August 2008 after the SABC's contract with DStv was not renewed. In 2007, the SABC launched a 24-hour international news channel, SABC News International, but closed in 2010.

== Criticisms and controversies ==
=== Accusations of pro-ANC bias ===
The SABC has been accused of being a government and ruling party mouthpiece, particularly in the lead-up to the 2014 South African elections, particularly after it refused to air the campaign adverts of various opposition parties, and again in 2015 when it censored the video feeds of the 2015 State of the Nation address that portrayed the ANC and President Jacob Zuma in a negative light. In 2015, Minister of Communications, Faith Muthambi reinforced the notion that the SABC was a state-owned company, and therefore, subject to control by the Department of Communications and the ruling party.

In August 2005, the SABC came under heavy fire from independent media and the public for failing to broadcast footage in which deputy president Phumzile Mlambo-Ngcuka was booed offstage by members of the ANC Youth League, who were showing support for the newly axed ex-deputy president, Jacob Zuma.

Rival broadcaster e.tv publicly accused SABC of biased reporting for failing to show the video footage of the humiliated deputy president. Snuki Zikalala, Head of News and ex-ANC spokesperson retorted that their cameraman had not been present at the meeting. This claim was later established to be false when e.tv footage was released which showed an SABC cameraman filming the incident.

The SABC's government connections also came under scrutiny when, in April 2005, Zimbabwean president Robert Mugabe was interviewed live by Zikalala, who is a former ANC political commissar. The interview was deemed by the public to have sidestepped 'critical issues', and to have avoided difficult questions regarding Mugabe's radical land-reform policies and human rights violations.

=== Accusations of censorship ===
In May 2006, the SABC was accused of self-censorship when it decided not to air a documentary on South African president Thabo Mbeki, and in early June 2006, the news organisation requested that the producers (from Daylight Films) not speak about it. This was widely criticised by independent media groups. In response, the International Freedom of Expression Exchange issued an alert concerning the SABC's apparent trend toward self-censorship.

In June 2006, the International Federation of Journalists denounced the cancelling of the Thabo Mbeki documentary, citing "self-censorship" and "politically-influenced managers".

Also in June 2006, SAfm host John Perlman disclosed on air that the SABC had created a blacklist of commentators. A commission of inquiry was created by SABC CEO Dali Mpofu to investigate the allegations that individuals had been blacklisted at the behest of Zikalala. Perlman eventually resigned from SAfm, and the broadcaster came under heavy criticism from free media advocates.

Shortly before the ANC's 2012 elective conference in Mangaung, the board of the SABC handed control of news, television, radio and sport to COO Hlaudi Motsoeneng. The board's decision was interpreted by some at the SABC as a calculated attempt to ensure that an ANC faction close to President Jacob Zuma was given positive coverage. During a press conference held by the SABC on 6 December 2012, to explain why it had prevented three journalists from participating in a discussion on how the media would cover the ANC's elective conference in Manguang, Hlaudi Motsoeneng said that whenever the ANC is discussed on the SABC an ANC party representative must be present.

In April 2014, journalists were warned by SABC chairperson, Ellen Zandile Tshabalala, that their phones were being wiretapped by the NIA, and reminded them to be loyal to the ANC ruling party. When challenged on the matter, Tshabalala insisted that her comments had been taken out of context. The scandal erupted at the same time that the DA official opposition accused the SABC of censorship when they stopped airing a television advert that referred to the ongoing Nkandlagate scandal.

In February 2015, the SABC was accused of censoring video and audio feeds of the State of the Nation address in Parliament, after opposition party EFF was forcefully ejected by armed plain-clothes policemen after interrupting the President's speech. Footage of opposition party DA walking out in protest over the presence of the armed personnel was also censored. This was in addition to the presence of a signal-jamming device that prevented journalists and MP's from being able to use their mobile devices to post news online.

The SABC was criticised for banning footage that showed protests and demonstrations in the run-up to the 2016 local elections. In July 2016, eight SABC journalists challenged the broadcaster's decision to censor news items, and were dismissed from the organisation. A subsequent hearing at the Labour Court found the dismissals were unlawful and ordered the reinstatement of four of the full-time SABC employees. During this period the eight journalists, including Suna Venter, were subjected to a number of death threats and other forms of intimidation.

In October 2016, the South African parliament began investigating corruption allegations against SABC and its Group Executive of Corporate Affairs - Hlaudi Motsoeneng. On 12 December, the Western Cape High Court ruled that Motsoeneng be removed from office effective immediately.

=== SABC Encore's launch party ===
At the channel's launch event, the COO of SABC at the time used that event to rant about making pay-TV platforms like MultiChoice's DStv pay for SABC 1-3 and how the SABC is run by a 'blind person'. He also took the stage to call out those with their 'lack of knowledge' over the deal the public broadcaster has for the channel alongside SABC News.

== See also ==
- Television in South Africa
- List of South African television series
- List of children and youth programs produced by the SABC
- World Indigenous Television Broadcasters Network
