= One FM 94.0 =

- Cape Town; South Africa
- Broadcast area: South Africa
- Frequency: 94.0 FM

Programming
- Language: English, Afrikaans and isiXhosa
- Format: Talk, contemporary hit radio

Ownership
- Owner: Blouberg Development Foundation NPC

History
- First air date: 12 August 2015; 10 years ago

Links
- Website: www.onefm.co.za

One FM 94.0 in Cape Town, South Africa is a community radio station that broadcasts to the community of the Western Atlantic Seaboard, in Cape Town, South Africa. One FM 94.0 received its Community Broadcast License from ICASA in 2014, but only went live to air on 12 August 2015 with automated programming. The license was granted as a geographically founded community radio station. The official live broadcast date with presenters was 21 March 2016 at 12H00, which coincides with Human Rights in South Africa.

In South Africa, Human Rights Day is celebrated on 21 March, in remembrance of the Sharpeville massacre which took place on 21 March 1960. This massacre occurred as a result of protests against the Apartheid regime in South Africa. South African Human Rights Day was declared a national holiday when the ANC was elected as the government with Nelson Mandela as the first democratically elected leader. Parliament's role on this day is to empower the people so that the democratic processes becomes known to all South Africans.

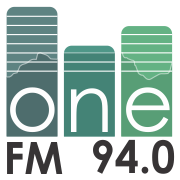
Official station logo of One FM 94.0

Broadcast Footprint of One FM 94.0

One FM 94.0 broadcasts to the geographical area of Table View, Blouberg, Big Bay, Milnerton, Bothasig, Monte Vista, Edgemead, Century City, Melkbosstrand, Parklands and includes the areas in between. Being a geographically founded station, the station's programming specifics focusses on 'local' content and news, and delivers information about pertaining to the broadcast areas.

Ownership of One FM 94.0

The broadcast license (No.: Class/Com/R238/Aug14) of One FM 94.0 was issued to the Blouberg Development Foundation NPC (Not-For-Profit Company), which was established to obtain a community broadcast license. The founding directors of the BDF are Ian Ward, Stacey Robertson, Riaan Combrink, Shadrack Dilima, Anne-Marie Jordaan, Pastor Brad Espin, Samantha Africa and Jeanette Jarvis. Pastor Brad Espin was elected as chairperson, Riaan Combrink as Vice Chairperson, Stacey Robertson as Secretary, and Samantha Africa as Treasurer.

Brainchild behind One FM 94.0

Radio veteran Ian Ward put pen to paper to establish a community radio station for the Western Atlantic Seaboard in 2009. Upon research that was available at the time, no frequencies were available to start a new community radio station. The idea was shelved, and it wasn't until 2013, while Ian Ward was working at Good Hope FM, that he fell ill will colon cancer. He took a sabbatical to have an operation, and it was during his recovery period and chemotherapy that he reignited the idea for a community radio station in the area that he stayed in.

Ian Ward approached Peter Bacon from Broadcast Solutions Electronics (Pty) Ltd to search for a spare frequency. After a frequency was found independently, Ian Ward tasked SENTECH to do a frequency map. SENTECH found similar findings to BSE, and these frequency maps were used to convince ICASA that there was in fact a spare frequency available. After much convincing, a Frequency Spectrum License was issued, and a Community Broadcast application was submitted to ICASA. The license was approved on 6 August 2014.

SENTECH was selected to provide the broadcasting service, and an antenna was erected on the roof of their Milpark offices in Milnerton, Cape Town. The first live transmission was on 12 August 2015 with an automated program, playing music, adverts and pre-recorded content. Meanwhile, a studio was built with the communities help at the Pick n Pay Table View Shopping Centre, and the first fully live broadcast went out to air on 21 March 2016, which is also Human Rights Day in South Africa.
