= 90.6 FM Stereo =

Community-based radio station based in Vanderbijlpark, South Africa

Coordinates: 26.668323°S 27.933769°E

90.6 FM Stereo is a community-based radio station based in Vanderbijlpark, South Africa. It broadcasts on 90.6 FM in the Vaal Triangle.

== See also ==
- List of radio stations in South Africa
