= TUT FM 96.2 =

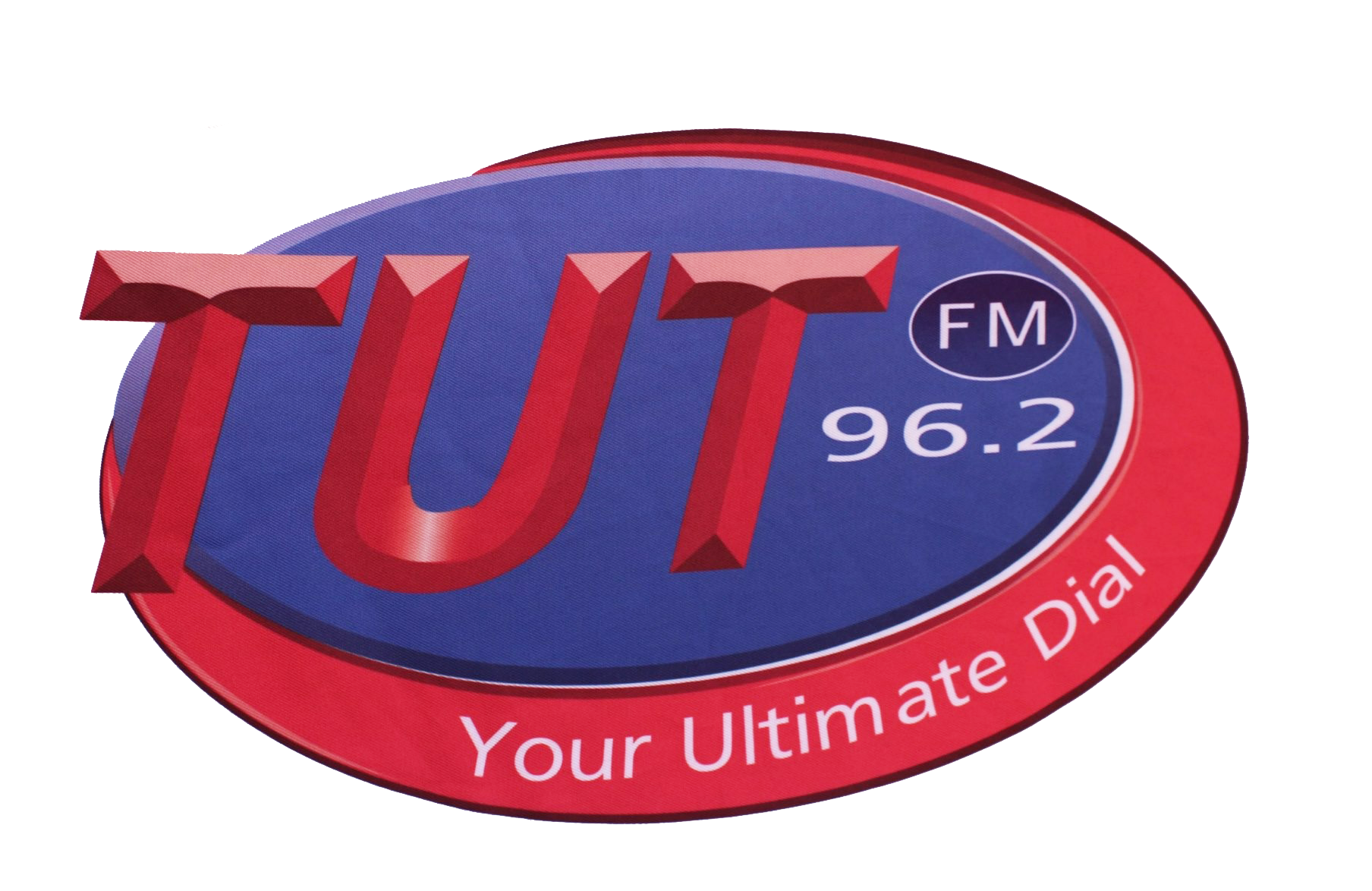

Soshanguve, Gauteng; South Africa
- Frequency: 96.2 MHz

Links
- Website: www.tutfm.co.za

TUT FM 96.2 is a South African university campus radio station based in Soshanguve, Gauteng. It broadcasts from the Soshanguve Campus of the Tshwane University of Technology.

The station mainly targets the youth / students.

It is one of the first campus community radio stations to be given a one-year term broadcasting licence by the then Independent Broadcasting Authority (IBA) in 1994. The station has been able to renew its licence under the Electronic Communications Act awarded in 2014.

The station broadcasts within a 50 km radius from 06:00 AM to 12:00 AM daily and has a listenership of about 50 000. It targets mainly the youth aged between 15 and 35 and broadcasts in six languages that are English, isiZulu, Sepedi, Setswana, Tshivenḓa, and Xitsonga as per regulatory framework.

TUT FM 96.2 broadcasts on 96.2 MHz FM Stereo from studios in the Tshwane University of Technology's Soshanguve Campus to most areas in Pretoria that are within a 50 km radius including Soshanguve, Ga-Rankuwa, Mabopane, Winterveldt, Pretoria suburbs and CBD, Centurion, Hatfield, Brooklyn, and many more. The station targets the listeners between 15 – 35 in the LSM group 3–7. The programming reflects a multi-cultural flavour targeted at the young black listener in the township, high school, college and university and the community, consists of about 40% talk and 60% music and includes the local news, traffic reports, and weather reports.

== Broadcast languages ==
- English
- Tswana
- Venda
- Zulu
- Pedi
- Tsonga

== Broadcast time ==
- 24/7
  - 18 hours of shows (6am to 12am)
  - 6 hours of automated shuttle (12am to 6am)

== Target audience ==
- Low to Middle Class
- Age Group 14 - 35
- Semi-urban and urban audience

== Programme format ==
- 60% Music
- 40% Talk

== Listenership figures ==
Estimated Listenership
	7 Day
Feb 2013	40 000
Dec 2012	58 000
Oct 2012	67 000
Aug 2012	63 000
Jun 2012	51 000

== Location ==
The station's physical address is:
No. 2 College Block L, Soshanguve, Gauteng

Soshanguve South campus of Tshwane University of Technology., ± 35 km North of Pretoria CBD.
