= Radio NFM 98.1 =

Okiep, Northern Cape; ZA
- Frequency: 98.1 MHz

History
- First air date: 2003

Links
- Website: www.radionfm.co.za

Radio NFM 98.1 is a South African community radio station based in Northern Cape.
The preparation and research phases date back to 1996 since the concept of community radio was introduced to the people of Namaqualand by the then Independent Broadcasting Authority (IBA) and it became a registered organisation in 2003.

== Coverage areas ==
- It has an area of coverage of 120 km/r, centered on Okiep
- Springbok
- Keetmanshoop
- Vanrynsdorp
- Alexander Bay
- Pofadder
- Rigtersveld
- Okiep
- Lutzville (30 Towns Surrounding Springbok)
- 100 km into Namibia.

== Broadcast languages ==
- Afrikaans
- English
- Nama
- Xhosa

== Broadcast time ==
- 24/7

== Target audience ==
- Community

== Programme format ==
- 40% Talk
- 60% Music

== Listenership figures ==
Estimated Listenership
	7 Day
May 2013	51 000
Feb 2013	52 000
Dec 2012	51 000
Oct 2012	50 000
Aug 2012	15 000
Jun 2012	16 000

== Location ==
The station's physical address is:
2 Main Road, Okiep
