= Lichvaal Stereo (92.6FM) =

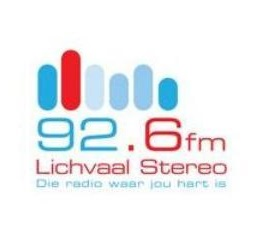

South Africa
- Frequency: 92.6 FM

Links
- Website: www.lichvaalstereo.co.za

Lichvaal Stereo (92.6FM) is a South African community radio station based in the North West.

== Coverage areas ==
- Lichtenberg
- Sannieshof
- Biesiesvlei
- Golingne
- Mafikeng
- Slurry Buhrmansdrift
- Mmabatho
- And 30 km into Botswana

== Broadcast languages ==
- Afrikaans

== Broadcast time ==
- 18 hours a day (everyday), from 05:00 to 23:00

== Target audience ==
- Afrikaans community
- LSM Groups 5 - 10
- Age Group 15 - 50+

== Programme format ==
- 60% Talk
- 40% Music

== Listenership Figures ==
Estimated Listenership
	7 Day
Jun 2013	2 000
May 2013	2 000
Feb 2013	0
Dec 2012	0
