= Makhado FM 107.3 =

South African radio station

Makhado FM is a community radio station based in the small town of Louis Trichardt in the Makhado Local Municipality of South Africa. It covers a radius of a few kilometres away from the town and is found on the 107.3 FM. It caters for all age groups.
