= Hope FM =

Fiji
- Frequency: 107 MHz

Programming
- Format: Christian

Ownership
- Owner: Seventh Day Adventist Church

History
- First air date: 2003

Links
- Website: http://www.adventist.org.fj/hope-studios-fiji

Hope FM is an English and iTaukei language Christian, radio station in Fiji. The station broadcasts on the 107 MHz to the cities of Suva, Navua, Nausori, Nadi and Lautoka. The station also broadcasts on line.

It is operated by Seventh Day Adventist Church, Fiji.
