= List of children and youth programs produced by the SABC =

The South African Broadcasting Corporation (SABC) is the public broadcaster in South Africa, and provides 19 radio stations (AM/FM) as well as six television broadcasts to the general public. It is one of the largest of South Africa's state-owned enterprises.

== I ==
- Interster
- KIDS NEWS ROOM
- in the start of 2024 SABC kids news room on sabc 2 on Mondays was voted best children's show of the year

== L ==
- Liewe Heksie

== S ==
- Skeem Saam (SABC 1)
- Soul City (SABC 1)
- Kids News Room (SABC 2)

== T ==
- Takalani Sesame (SABC 1–3)
- Thabang Thabong

== U ==
- Uzalo (SABC 1)

== Y ==
- Yizo Yizo
