= Kurara FM =

- South Africa
- Broadcast area: Northern Cape
- Frequency: 98.9 MHz

Kurara FM is a South African community radio station based in the Northern Cape.

== Coverage Areas & Frequencies ==
Kuruman and the borders of North West reaching 180 Villages

== Broadcast Languages ==
- Setswana (50%)
- English (30%)
- Afrikaans (20%)

== Broadcast Time ==
- 24/7

== Target Audience ==
- LSM Groups 1 – 8
- Kids (20%), Adults (30%), Youth (50%)

== Programme Format ==
- 70% Music
- 30% Talk

== Listenership Figures ==
Estimated Listenership
	7 Day
May 2013	5 000
Feb 2013	34 000
Dec 2012	34 000
Oct 2012	33 000
