= Icora FM =

South Africa
- Frequency: 100.4FM

History
- First air date: 10 December 1997

Links
- Website: www.icorafm.co.za

Icora FM (Indonsakusa Community Radio) is a South African community radio station based in KwaZulu-Natal.
It was established on 10 December 1997 in King Dinuzulu Township, Eshowe.

== Coverage areas ==
- From St Lucia, down the coast past Richards Bay & Stanger, through to Ballito.
- Includes:
  - Eshowe
  - Empangeni
  - Ulundi
  - Nongoma
  - Vryheid
  - Dundee
  - Glencoe
  - Madadeni
  - And touches parts of Utrecht & Newcastle.

== Broadcast languages ==
- Zulu

== Broadcast time ==
- 24/7

== Target audience ==
- LSM Groups 1 - 6
- Age Group 16 - 49
- From grassroots to upper middle class

== Programme format ==
- 30% Talk
- 70% Music

== Listenership Figures ==
Estimated Listenership
	7 Day
May 2013	59 000
Feb 2013	136 000
Dec 2012	135 000
Oct 2012	136 000
Aug 2012	205 000
Jun 2012	203 000

== Location ==
The station's physical address is:
25 Osborne Rd, Eshowe
