= Radio Mafisa 93.4 FM =

Radio Mafisa

South Africa
- Frequency: 93.4 FM

Links
- Website: new.mafisafm.co.za

Radio Mafisa 93.4 FM is a South African community radio station based in the North West.

== Coverage areas ==
- Rustenburg
- Brits
- Hartebeespoort
- Magaliesburg
- Swartruggens
- Ventersdorp
- Ga-Rankuwa

== Broadcast languages ==
- Tswana
- English

== Broadcast time ==
- 24/7

== Target audience ==
- Whole community, primarily youth
- LSM Groups 1 - 8
- Age Group 16 - 35

== Programme format ==
- 40% Talk
- 60% Music

== Listenership figures ==
Estimated Listenership
| | 7 Day |
|---|---|
| Jun 2013 | 137 000 |
| May 2013 | 133 000 |
| Feb 2013 | 177 000 |
| Dec 2012 | 179 000 |
