= Radio Riverside 98.2 FM =

Riverside 98.2 FM
- South Africa
- Broadcast area: Northern Cape
- Frequency: 98.2 MHz

Riverside 98.2 FM is a South African community radio station based in the Northern Cape.

== Coverage Areas & Frequencies ==
- Upington
- Karos
- Keimoes
- Morning Glory
- Nisikilelo
- Currieskamp

== Broadcast Languages ==
- English
- Afrikaans
- Xhosa
- Setswana

== Broadcast Time ==
- 06h00 – 24h00

== Target Audience ==
- LSM Groups 1 – 7

== Programme Format ==
- 40% Music
- 60% Talk

== Listenership Figures ==
Estimated Listenership
	7 Day
May 2013	87 000
Feb 2013	54 000
Dec 2012	53 000
Oct 2012	54 000
Aug 2012	69 000
Jun 2012	72 000
