= Radio Panorama 107.6 FM =

Radio Panorama

South Africa
- Frequency: 107.6 FM

Radio Panorama 107.6 FM is a South African community radio station based in the Free State.

== Coverage areas ==
- Welkom
- Virginia
- Kroonstad
- Ventersburg
- Allanridge
- Odendaalsrus
- Henneman
- Touches Senekal, Theunissen, Bothaville, and Wesselsbron

== Broadcast languages ==
- Afrikaans
- English

== Broadcast time ==
- 00h01 – 00h00

== Target audience ==
- Whole community
- LSM Groups 3 - 10
- Age Group 16 – 50+

== Programme format ==
- 40% Talk
- 60% Music

== Listenership Figures ==
Estimated Listenership
| | 7 Day |
|---|---|
| Jul 2014 | 46 000 |
| May 2013 | 16 000 |
| Feb 2013 | 13 000 |
| Dec 2012 | 10 000 |
