= BRFM (The Border Drive) =

South African radio station

BRFM (The Border Drive) is a South African radio station.

The station received a broadcast license from ICASA.

== Listenership Figures ==
Estimated Listenership
	7 Day	Ave. Mon-Fri
May 2013	127 000	45 000
Feb 2013	134 000	52 000
Dec 2012	135 000	53 000
Oct 2012	149 000	58 000
Aug 2012	109 000	43 000
Jun 2012	109 000	42 000
