= Ulwazi FM 88.9 =

Ulwazi FM

South Africa
- Broadcast area: Northern Cape
- Frequency: 88.9 MHz

Ulwazi FM is a South African community radio station based in the Northern Cape.

== Coverage Areas & Frequencies ==
Emthanjeni Local Municipality in Pixley ka Seme District Municipality, De Aar (88.9 FM).

== Broadcast Languages ==
- English
- Afrikaans
- isiXhosa

== Broadcast Time ==
- 24/7

== Target Audience ==
- LSM Groups 1 – 8

== Listenership Figures ==
Estimated Listenership
| | 7 Day |
|---|---|
| May 2013 | 7 000 |
| Feb 2013 | 24 000 |
| Dec 2012 | 25 000 |
| Oct 2012 | 24 000 |
| Aug 2012 | 24 000 |
| Jun 2012 | 24 000 |
