= IFM 102.2 (South Africa) =

South Africa
- Frequency: 102.2FM

Links
- Website: www.ifmradio.co.za

IFM 102.2 (IFM 102.2 Radio) is a South African community radio station based in Gauteng.

== Coverage areas ==
- Vanderbijlpark
- Mittal Steel Works
- Vereeniging
- Sasolburg
- Sebokeng
- Sharpeville
- Meyerton
- Evaton
- And parts of Lenasia

== Broadcast languages ==
- Afrikaans
- English
- Zulu
- Sotho

== Broadcast time ==
- 24/7

== Target audience ==
- LSM Groups 6 - 10
- Age Group 25 - 49
- Mainly Mittal Steelworkers and their families in the surrounding communities

== Programme format ==
- 30% Talk
- 70% Music

== Listenership Figures ==
Estimated Listenership
	7 Day
May 2013	26 000
Feb 2013	37 000
Dec 2012	34 000
Oct 2012	34 000
Aug 2012	33 000
Jun 2012	25 000

== Location ==
The station's physical address is:
Arcelor Mittal, HR Building - Main Gate, Delfos Boulevard, Vanderbijlpark
