= Letlhabile Community Radio =

South Africa
- Frequency: 99.5 FM

Links
- Website: www.letlhabile.mobi

Letlhabile Community Radio is a South African community radio station based in the North West.

== Coverage areas ==
- Mabopane
- Brits
- Sun City
- Koster
- Rustenburg
- Ga-Rankuwa
- Hartebeespoort
- Olievenhoutbosh

== Broadcast languages ==
- Afrikaans
- Xhosa
- Tswana
- North Sotho
- Zulu
- English

== Broadcast time ==
- 24/7

== Target audience ==
- African language speaking listeners in community
- LSM Groups 1 - 6
- Age Group 18 - 50+

== Programme format ==
- 50% Talk
- 50% Music

== Listenership Figures ==
Estimated Listenership
	7 Day
Jun 2013	28 000
May 2013	20 000
Feb 2013	59 000
Dec 2012	59 000
