= Mosupatsela FM Stereo =

Mangaung; South Africa
- Frequency: 107.4 FM

Mosupatsela FM Stereo is a South African community radio station based in c section in Botshabelo (near Bloemfontein), Free State.

== Coverage areas ==
- Bloemfontein
- Botshabelo townships A, B, C, D, E, F, G, H, J, K, L, M, N, R, S, U, V, W Sections
- Edenburg
- Dewetsdorp
- Thaba Nchu
- Clocolan
- Brandfort
- Marquard
- Winburg
- Petrusburg
- Theunissen
- Bultfontein
- Virginia

== Broadcast languages ==
- English
- Sesotho
- Xhosa
- Tswana

== Broadcast time ==
- 24/7

== Target audience ==
- Black community
- LSM Groups 1 - 8
- Age Group 16 – 49

== Programme format ==
- 60% Talk
- 40% Music

== Listenership Figures ==
Estimated Listenership
	7 Day
Jun 2013	96 000
May 2013	103 000
Feb 2013	125 000
Dec 2012	143 000
