= Lentswe Community Radio =

- South Africa
- Frequency: 93.0 FM

Lentswe Community Radio was a South African community radio station based in the Free State province of South Africa.

== Coverage areas ==
- Based in Parys, it covered most of Ngwathe (Fezile Dabi District Municipality) in the Free State.
- Also reached most of the southern part of Gauteng and a small section of the eastern part of the North West.
- Includes Brits, Potchefstroom, Kroonstad, Sasolburg, Johannesburg and Soweto.

== Broadcast languages ==
- English
- SeSotho
- Xhosa
- Afrikaans

== Broadcast time ==
- 24/7

FORMER RESENTERS

.Mamokebisa Ditlame

. Armour Mojaki

.Tsekiso Mantoro

.Steve Naale

. Thomas Nopheche

.Fuzile Ncai

.Lucky Selai

.Thami Thandiso

. Thabo Mbele

. Thabo Mokoena

. Mzwandile Sontyale

. Sello Pheto

. Ace Mpinga

. Timothy Masemola

.Mamello Rathebe

.Teboho Mokoena .Isaac Mohamad

.Isaac Mohaka

. Bonnie Nzunga

.Mbulelo Mtshilibe

== Target audience ==
- General public and working community
- LSM groups 1-8
- Age group 16–50+

== Programme format ==
- 60% talk
- 40% music

== Listenership figures ==
Estimated listenership
	7 day
Dec 2012	24 000
Feb 2013	29 000
May 2013	6 000
Jun 2013	9 000

In 2019, the station was closed down by ICASA for not adhering to its rules and regulations.
