= MPowerFM =

Radio station in Mpumalanga, South Africa

South Africa
- Broadcast area: Mpumalanga

Programming
- Language: English
- Format: Adult Contemporary

History
- First air date: December 2007

Links
- Website: http://www.mpowerfm.co.za

MPowerFM is a commercial radio station serving Mpumalanga. Broadcasting from studios in eMalahleni and Mbombela, MPowerFM went on air in December 2007.

== History ==
MPowerFM was a dream that became a reality in the early part of 2006. With African Media Entertainment (AME) and Direng, shareholders and owners of various radio stations in South Africa, approaching the Lowveld Chamber of Business and Commerce to enter into a bid for the tender of the only commercial radio licence to be issued by ICASA in Mpumalanga. After a lengthy process of acquiring potential local investors, as well as investors from up country, a successful bid was presented to ICASA and won. This resulted in the birth of MPowerFM - the first and only commercial radio station in Mpumalanga.

State of the art equipment was installed into their studios, which broadcast across the province on the 7 frequencies made available to them by Sentec.

Over the past few years some changes have occurred, with challenges that are faced by many startup companies. From opening the Witbank (Emalahleni) Studio at the Ridge to moving their main studio's to the Grove Shopping Centre in the Riverside Precinct in Nelspruit (Mbombela). Things have progressed and MPowerFM is fast becoming the heart of Mpumalanga. With great emphasis being placed on supporting charities and communities with specific needs, the radio station continues to strive and meet the expectations of the community at large.

== Take over ==
Mpowerfm was bought out by Times Media Group in December 2013. The radio station now goes by the name RISEfm (www.risefm.co.za)

== Coverage Areas & Frequencies ==
Broadcasting from eMalahleni (Witbank) to all of Mpumalanga

Coverage Areas & Frequencies
| Area | Freq. |
|---|---|
| Nelspruit / White River / Komatipoort / Barberton | 94.3 FM |
| eMhalahleni (Witbank) / Middleburg | 106.4 FM |
| Davel / Ermelo / Secunda / Standerton / Bethal | 105.8 FM |
| Sabie, Graskop / Pilgrims Rest / Mashishing (Lydenburg) | 89.7 FM |
| Piet Retief | 89.0 FM |
| Dullstroom | 101.6 FM |
| Chrissiesmeer / Carolina | 94.8 FM |

== Current Presenters ==
•Shaun Lukhele •Portia Adams •Tony Murrell •Dave Walters •Sasha •Sam Jagger •Celani Dubai •Desire Malunga

== Broadcast Languages ==
- English

== Broadcast Time ==
- 24/7

== Target Audience ==
- LSM Groups 7 – 10
- Adults

== Programme Format ==
- 80% Music
- 20% Talk

== Listenership Figures ==
Estimated Listenership
| | 7 Day | Ave. Mon-Fri |
|---|---|---|
| May 2013 | 109 000 | 40 000 |
| Feb 2013 | 85 000 | 30 000 |
| Dec 2012 | 84 000 | 23 000 |
| Oct 2012 | 61 000 | 19 000 |
| Aug 2012 | 68 000 | 21 000 |
| Jun 2012 | 82 000 | 28 000 |
