= Mafikeng Community Radio 96.7 =

Mafikeng Community Radio
- South Africa
- Frequency: 96.7 FM

Links
- Website: www.maffm.co.za

Mafikeng Community Radio 96.7 is a South African community radio station based in the North West.

== Coverage areas ==
Radius of 100 km centered on Mafikeng:

- Mafikeng
- Setlaole
- Madibogo
- Gelukspan
- Kopela
- Ramatlabama
- Itsoseng
- Lichtenburg
- Tshidilamolomo

== Broadcast languages ==
- Tswana
- English

== Broadcast time ==
- 24/7

== Target audience ==
- Community
- LSM Groups 2 - 9

== Listenership Figures ==
Estimated Listenership
	7 Day
Jun 2013	71 000
May 2013	72 000
Feb 2013	154 000
Dec 2012	148 000
