= RAM FM (West Bank) =

Radio station in Palestine

- Ramallah; Palestine
- Broadcast area: Palestine and Israel
- Frequency: 93.6 MHz (87.7 MHz in Jerusalem)

Programming
- Format: Hot AC

Ownership
- Owner: Middle East Broadcasting Holding Ltd.

History
- First air date: 21 February 2007
- Last air date: 7 August 2008

RAM FM was an independent English-speaking radio station broadcasting from Ramallah, Palestine.

== History ==
Radio 702's success in Johannesburg, South Africa – in Primedia Broadcasting's stable of four radio stations – led Issie Kirsh, the founder and first chairperson, to seek to emulate this winning formula in Israel and Palestine. In 2004, Issie Kirsh met Raf Gangat, the former South African Representative to the Palestinian Authority, and the seed was planted. Three years later, after much research, groundwork and implementation, 93.6 RAM FM was born – a licensed radio station, broadcasting from Palestine into Israel and Jordan, with studios in Ramallah and Jerusalem with Gangat hosting one of the main shows 9@9 which gained popularity thanks to Raf's diplomatic experience and knowledge in the region. The Talk@10 was the main segment of the show and Palestinian and Israeli officials were hosted to discuss contentious issues.

The Hot AC Music Format created a listenership of Palestinians, Israelis and Jordanians as well as a substantial number of foreign nationals who worked for Embassies, UN and international organizations and foreign press in the region. 93.6 RAM FM’s format comprised music, Middle East news on the hour, presenters from South Africa, Palestine, England and Australia. Its intent was to create a bridge between Palestinians and Israelis, providing a platform for both sides to discuss and listen to the other’s narrative and thereby create meaningful understanding. With Studios in Ramallah and Jerusalem, connected by microwave link, it employed state-of-the-art technology which is used by modern media today. Middle East Eyewitness News was ‘in touch, in tune and independent’. In order to maintain neutrality, the station played only English music and opted to air only commercials from multinational brands.

== Awards ==
RAM FM was awarded two international prizes for the significant role it played in the region. The owner and chairman of the station in South Africa applauded the management's role in making the station a success which was reflected in the unprecedented increase in its listenership within a short period of time.

== Closure ==
Ram FM officially closed down at 7pm on 7 August 2008 with the final song being Give Peace a Chance by John Lennon after less than two years on air.
