= KZN Capital 104FM =

KZN Capital 104fm
- South Africa
- Frequency: 104.0 MHz

History
- First air date: mid-2014

Links
- Website: capital104.co.za

KZN Capital 104fm is a South African community radio station based in Pietermaritzburg, KwaZulu-Natal which started broadcasting in mid-2014. The station was founded by Jerry Jones, a former municipal employee, mobile DJ and community radio presenter.

== History ==
Jones had been applying for funding for a radio station for Pietermaritzburg for over 25 years, from various sources. In 2011, an application was made to the Independent Communications Authority of South Africa (ICASA) who granted a community radio licence. In 2013, an application and presentation for funding was made to the Media Development and Diversity Agency (MDDA), a statutory development agency for promoting and ensuring media development and diversity. The application was successful and funds were made available to equip the station with a broadcasting studio and a production studio.

Premises were secured at 152 Langalalibele Street in Pietermaritzburg. The transmitter is situated at the Worlds View base station.

== Output ==
The station broadcasts 24 hours a day and is streamed online. The weekday format is breakfast, mid-morning, afternoon and drive shows with presenters from the local community. Evening shows cover community affairs, as well as talk, sport and music.

At weekends the station broadcasts a Saturday breakfast show, a motoring show and an Afrikaans community show followed by current affairs shows and sport with Sundays catering for various religious communities and a specific show aimed at youth and children.

The station has no fixed music policy due to the wide age and cultural demographic.
