= Cape Community FM =

Community radio station in South Africa

CCFM
- Cape Town; South Africa
- Broadcast area: Cape Town, False Bay, Stellenbosch, Goodwood, Fish Hoek, Simon’s Town, Atlantis.
- Frequency: 107.5 MHz 96.7 MHz

Programming
- Format: Music, news, sport

Links
- Website: www.ccfm.org.za

CCFM (Cape Community FM) is a community radio station based in Cape Town, South Africa.

As a non-profit radio station who must adhere to ICASA Community Broadcasting regulations, CCFM broadcasts a mix of contemporary Christian music, combined with talk, views and interviews, and up-to-the-minute news, weather, and traffic information. Its slogan is “Changing lives for good.”

== History ==
CCFM started as Radio Fish Hoek in 1993. The station was founded by the Fish Hoek Baptist Church. It currently broadcasts in Cape Town, False Bay, Stellenbosch, Goodwood, Fish Hoek, Simon’s Town, and Atlantis on 96.7 & 107.5 FM. English is its primary language, but airs some Xhosa & Afrikaans as well.

== Demographic ==
CCFM styles itself as a Christian radio station, boasting about 152,000 listeners as of October 2014. About 10% are younger than 25, a quarter are 25–34, a third are 35–49, and 30% are 50 or older. The sex of the audience breaks 48% male, 52% female.
