= Setsoto FM Stereo =

Setsoto Fm Stereo

Ficksburg; South Africa
- Broadcast area: Eastern Free State
- Frequency: 93.7Mkhz

Programming
- Format: Multicultural

Ownership
- Owner: Maluti Media Networks

History
- First air date: 28/02/2000

Technical information
- Transmitter coordinates: Key People=P. Mothijoa & T Sibiya

Links
- Webcast: www.setsotofm.caster.fm/

Setsoto FM Stereo is a South African community radio station based in the Free State. The station is directly responsible and accountable to Maluti Media Network as a community-based project; Setsoto FM is operated by volunteers from within the community of Greater Ficksburg and its surrounding areas.

== Coverage areas ==
From its studios in Ficksburg

- East into Bloemfontein, covering areas such as:
  - Ficksburg
  - Senekal
  - Marquard
  - Clocolan
  - Ladybrand
  - Maseru in Lesotho
  - Leribe in (Lesotho)

== Broadcast languages ==
- English 30%
- SeSotho 60%
- Afrikaans 10%

== Broadcast time ==
- 24/7

== Target audience ==
- Multicultural community
- LSM Groups 1 - 8
- Age Group 16 - 49

== Programme format ==
- 45% Talk
- 55% Music

== Listenership Figures ==
Estimated Listenership
	7 Day
July 2016	16 000
July 2017	27 000
July 2022	62 000
