= Modiri FM =

South Africa
- Frequency: 91.7 FM

Links
- Website: www.modirifm.co.za

Modiri FM is a South African community radio station based in the North West.

== Coverage areas ==
- Delarayville
- Vryburg
- Sannieshof

== Broadcast languages ==
- Afrikaans
- Tswana
- English

== Broadcast time ==
- 24/7

== Target audience ==
- Working Class, and Farm Workers
- LSM Groups 6 - 8
- Age Group 16 - 80

== Programme format ==
- 40% Talk
- 60% Music

== Listenership Figures ==
Estimated Listenership
	7 Day
Jun 2013	2 000
May 2013	-
