= Koepel Stereo (KSFM 94.9) =

South Africa
- Frequency: 94.9FM

Links
- Website: ksfm.co.za

Koepel Stereo (KSFM 94.9) is a South African community radio station based in the South African province Free State.

== Coverage areas ==
- Sasolburg
- Parys
- Vereeniging
- Heilbron
- Koppies
- Vredefort
- Vanderbijlpark
- Potchefstroom

== Broadcast languages ==
- Predominantly Afrikaans
- A bit of English
- A bit of Sotho

== Broadcast time ==
- 24/7

== Target audience ==
- World Heritage Site of Vredefort Dome
- Municipal district of Ngwathe
- LSM Groups 6 - 10
- Age Group 16 - 60

== Programme format ==
- 20% Talk
- 80% Music

== Listenership Figures ==
Estimated Listenership
	7 Day
Feb 2022	5 000
Feb 2021	1 000
Feb 2020	000
Feb 2019	000
Feb 2018	000
Feb 2017	15 000
Feb 2016	12 000
Feb 2015	8 000
Feb 2014	6 000
Feb 2013	4 000
Jun 2013	3 000
May 2013	4 000
Feb 2013	4 000
Dec 2012	2 000

https://www.ksfm.co.za==References==
