= Aganang FM =

Coordinates: 26°43′13.27″S 27°3′56.23″E

North West; South Africa
- Frequency: 90.0 FM

Links
- Website: www.aganangfm.org.za

Aganang FM is a South African community radio station based in the North West.

== Coverage areas ==
Covers a 100 km radius that includes:

- Potchefstroom
- Klerksdorp
- Ventersdorp
- Orkney
- Stilfontein
- Merafong

== Broadcast languages ==
- Afrikaans
- SeSotho
- North Sotho
- English

== Broadcast time ==
- 24/7

== Target audience ==
- LSM Groups 4 - 8
- Age Group 14 - 60

== Programme format ==
- 60% Talk
- 40% Music

== Listenership Figures ==
Estimated Listenership
	7 Day
Jun 2013	59 000
May 2013	65 000
Feb 2013	58 000
Dec 2012	48 000
