= Radio Kaap se Punt =

Radio Kaap se Punt is a community radio station which broadcasts in the Northern and Southern Suburbs of Cape Town, the Cape Flats and all the directions from a town called Grabouw. It is governed by the Kaapse Kulturele Uitsaai Assosiasie. Radio Kaap se Punt was founded in the terms of the Electronic Communications Act (ECA), the ICASA Code of Conduct and the Broadcasting Complaints Code of South Africa of the National Association of Broadcasters (NAB). After being established in February 2010, broadcasting officially commenced on 31 May 2013. The current frequency which the radio station broadcasts at is 90.7 FM. Two new frequencies will be launched in 2015. These frequencies will be 99.0 FM and 102.7 FM. Radio Kaapse Punt broadcasts a variety of genres. These genres include talk, news, drama and music. It broadcasts in three of the eleven national languages. The languages in which it broadcasts are Afrikaans, English and isiXhosa. With an annual total budget of less than R1 million, Radio Kaap se Punt is run by two full-time managers (interns in terms of EPWP) and many volunteers who together manage to provide radio and online services to a geographic area of 3.2 million people. The upside of a shortage of financial resources available to RKP is a dependence on these volunteers at a time in the history of South Africa when voluntarism is anything but de rigueur.

Radio Kaap se Punt is also informally referred to as RKP. Its theme of heritage finds reflection in many of its Talk programmes which themselves consistently promote a diversity of views and perspectives.

The primary goal of RKP is to provide a voice for people in the Cape who are increasingly beginning to feel that they are being socially and politically marginalised in the new post-liberation landscape.

Key stakeholders Kezzi Milani - business woman, outgoing Chair Sylvia Thomas - founding member, director Terry Lester - Arch deacon, director Peter Rontsch- publisher, director Doreen Musson - founding member, director

History The first community radio stations were established only in a post-apartheid South Africa, after 1994. Since then hundreds of community radios have taken to the air across the country providing voices to every citizen who cares to take up the platforms.

Today community radio is beginning to shed its Cinderella status as they compete with public-funded public radio stations and commercial radio stations supported by an army of advertisers, for the same listener-communities.

In its short history RKP has weathered more than its fair share of storms, which have provided it with all the lessons needed to shape and build a sustainable future & is intent in its vision to contribute towards development and information sharing.
