= Vuma FM =

South Africa
- Broadcast area: Kwa-Zulu Natal
- Frequency: 103.0 MHz

Vuma FM is a Zulu language South African commercial radio station based in Durban, Kwa-Zulu Natal.The station can also be heard online from its website and can be found on Facebook and Twitter

Launched on the 22 November 2012 as a commercial radio station. Content is 90% isiZulu and 10% English. Music accounts for 70% of the content and is inspirational with a 50/50 split between international and local. The remainder of the content covers topics such as lifestyle, news, current affairs, events and roadshows, and is inspired by community involvement.
