= X-K FM 107.9 =

Indigenous San peoples radio station in South Africa

X-K FM
- South Africa
- Broadcast area: Northern Cape
- Frequency: 107.9 MHz

Ownership
- Owner: SABC

History
- First air date: 18 August 2000; 26 years ago

Links
- Webcast: web.sabc.co.za/digital/player/1.0/xkfm/index.html
- Website: www.sabc.co.za/sabc/radio/

X-K FM (or !Xunkhwesa Dom Kxui FM) is a South African community radio station based in the Northern Cape. It was founded on 18 August 2000. Its mission is to preserve the !Xun and Khwe languages and cultures, uplifting, developing and informing the community.

== History ==
X-K FM started broadcasting on 18 August 2000 to prevent the death of !Xun and Khwe languages. For this end, the SABC spent 700,000 rand to set it up. At launch, it was based in a shipping container, had a 20-40km range, and had a potential audience of 20,000 San people. In addition to cultural programming, it has also carried news and music since the beginning.

== Coverage Areas & Frequencies ==
30 km radius around Platfontein (Sol Plaatje Local Municipality), which is approximately 15 km from Kimberley on the road to Barkly West in the Northern Cape.

== Broadcast Languages ==
- !Xun
- Khwe
- Afrikaans (as a bridging language)

== Broadcast Time ==
- 06:00 - 18:00
- 06:00 - 21:00

== Target Audience ==
- San people of Platfontein in the Northern Cape
- LSM Groups 1 – 6
- Age Groups:
  - 16 - 24 (21%)
  - 25 - 34 (34%)
  - 35 - 49 (15%)
  - 50+ (30%)

== Listenership Figures ==
Estimated Listenership
| | 7 Day |
|---|---|
| May 2013 | 3 000 |
| Feb 2013 | 1 000 |
| Dec 2012 | 3 000 |
| Oct 2012 | 6 000 |
| Aug 2012 | 7 000 |
| Jun 2012 | 5 000 |
