= QwaQwa Radio =

Phuthaditjhaba; South Africa
- Broadcast area: Eastern Free State
- Frequency: 87.5 - 100.3FM

Links
- Website: www.qwaqwafm.mobi

QwaQwa Radio (Qwa-Qwa Radio 100.3FM) is a South African community radio station based in the Free State.

== Coverage areas ==
- QwaQwa
- Kestel
- Harrismith
- Bethlehem, Free State
- Phutaditjhaba

== Broadcast languages ==
- English
- SeSotho

== Broadcast time ==
- 24/7

== Target audience ==
- LSM Groups 3 - 8

== Programme format ==
- 60% Talk
- 40% Music

== Listenership Figures ==
Estimated Listenership
	7 Day
May 2013	200 000
Feb 2013	205 000
Dec 2012	205 000
Oct 2012	205 000
Aug 2012	185 000
Jun 2012	186 000

== Location ==
The station's physical address is:
Witsieshoek, Phuthaditjhaba
