= UMhlobo Wenene FM =

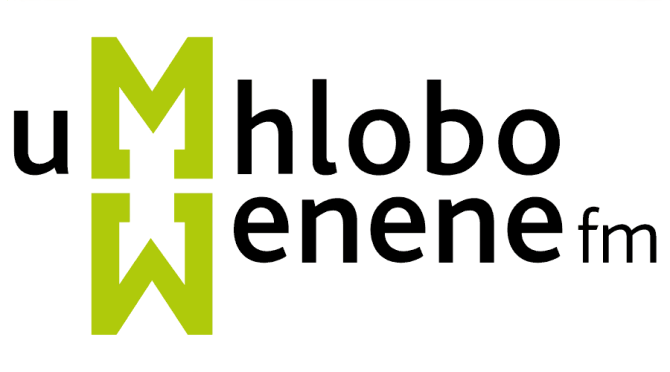

Port Elizabeth; South Africa
- Broadcast area: South Africa
- Frequency: FM: 88-106 MHz

Ownership
- Owner: SABC
- Sister stations: Ukhozi FM

History
- First air date: 6 May 1960; 65 years ago

Links
- Website: www.umhlobowenenefm.co.za

UMhlobo Wenene FM (UWFM) is a South African radio station, providing news, sports, and entertainment broadcasts in isiXhosa. The station broadcasts 24/7 on Channel 818 on DStv. It is the second-largest radio station in South Africa, with 4 million listeners.

Broadcasting began on May 6, 1960, from the city of Grahamstown now Makhanda before moving to Kingwilliamstown now Qonce and finally settled in Port Elizabeth (now Gqeberha), under the name Radio Xhosa, before a renaming following the fall of apartheid and the 1994 election.

The station has a broadcasting license from ICASA (Independent Communications Authority of South Africa).

The station has received a number of awards.

The name "uMhlobo Wenene" means "True Friend" in Xhosa.
