= Tru fm =

Tru FM
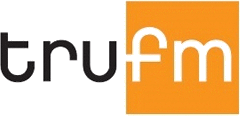

Bhisho; South Africa
- Broadcast area: Eastern Cape
- Frequency: 89.9 to 104.1 MHz

Ownership
- Owner: SABC

History
- First air date: 2008

Links
- Website: http://www.trufm.co.za

Tru FM is a South African commercial radio station based in the Eastern Cape. The station is unique in the SABC PBS stable as it is the only station primarily targeting the youth with two languages of broadcast, IsiXhosa and English.

The station is a successor of CKI fm which itself was formerly known as Radio Ciskei. The station was rebranded and relaunched in 2008

trufm runs an annual presenter search called tru talent search. Some of the winners include Boyz Mpunzi in 2016 and Ntombozuko Balintulo.

== Broadcast Languages ==
- English
- isiXhosa

== Broadcast time ==
- 24/7

== Listenership Figures ==
Estimated Listenership
	7 Day	Ave. Mon-Fri
Jan 2023	293 000	92 000
Dec 2022	286 000	92 000
Sep 2022	262 000	87 000
June 2022	259 000	90 000
Mar 2022	242 000	78 000
Jan 2022	238 000	69 000
Oct 2021	261 000	77 000
Aug 2021	282 000	76 000
May 2013	245 000	102 000
Feb 2013	299 000	131 000
Dec 2012	315 000	141 000
Oct 2012	339 000	151 000
Aug 2012	317 000	116 000
Jun 2012	275 000	98 000
