= Radiokansel / Radio Pulpit =

South African radio station

South Africa
- Frequency: 657 AM

Radio Pulpit is a Christian radio station in South Africa.

== Broadcast languages ==
- English
- Afrikaans

Radio Pulpit has an LSM of 6-10 and broadcasts in multiple languages. These include 35% Afrikaans and 35% English. The remaining 30% consists of vernacular languages.

== Broadcast time ==
- 24/7

== Target audience ==
- LSM groups 2–9
- Age group 35-49
- Christians

== Coverage areas and frequencies ==
- National on 657 AM
- DStv channel 882
- Open View channel 607

== Listenership figures ==
Estimated Listenership
| | 7 Day | Ave. Mon-Fri |
|---|---|---|
| May 2013 | 126 000 | 49 000 |
| Feb 2013 | 133 000 | 53 000 |
| Dec 2012 | 158 000 | 60 000 |
| Oct 2012 | 176 000 | 71 000 |
| Aug 2012 | 141 000 | 54 000 |
| Jun 2012 | 165 000 | 55 000 |
