= OFM (South Africa) =

South Africa
- Broadcast area: Central South Africa
- Branding: OFM 94 – 97

Programming
- Format: Adult Contemporary

Ownership
- Sister stations: Algoa FM

History
- First air date: 1986
- Former call signs: Radio Oranje

Links
- Website: www.ofm.co.za

OFM is a regional radio station based in Bloemfontein, South Africa.

It was originally a split of Radio Highveld, and began broadcasting under the name Radio Oranje (Radio Orange – after the Orange Free State, its home province) in 1986.

== Footprint ==
OFM covers four provinces – the Free State, the North West province, Gauteng and the Northern Cape. In 2005, it commenced broadcasts into the Vaal Triangle area. It broadcasts in English and Afrikaans, in an adult contemporary format. OFM runs a full news service, broadcasting up to 14 news bulletins daily. OFM is a commercial radio station licensed by ICASA. The head office is situated in Bloemfontein. In 2024 its listenership was 216 000.

== Ownership ==
It was privatised in 1996 after the South African Broadcasting Corporation decided to sell off its commercial regional stations. Current owners are African Media Entertainment (75%) and Kagiso Media (24.9%).
