= SAfm (South Africa) =

National public radio station in South Africa

- South Africa
- Frequencies: 104–107 MHz FM & DAB+ Trial In Cape Town Johannesburg and Pretoria

Programming
- Format: News radio, talk radio

Ownership
- Owner: SABC

History
- First air date: 1936
- Former names: "A" Programme; English Service (1937–1985); Radio South Africa (1985–1995)

Links
- Webcast: www.antfarm.co.za/clients/safm/safm_22.asx
- Website: www.safm.co.za/sabc/home/safm

SAfm is a national, English-language public radio station in South Africa. It has been operated by the South African Broadcasting Corporation (SABC) since its founding in 1936.

== History ==
SAfm was the SABC's first radio station, and the country's first public radio station. From 1924 to 1936, the only radio service in South Africa was a privately owned station called JB, which broadcast to the cities of Johannesburg, Durban, and (later) Cape Town. An Act of Parliament in 1936 made official the conversion of JB into a public broadcaster.

In its early days as a public radio service, the station was called the "A" Programme. When the SABC started an Afrikaans-language station in 1937, the two stations came to be called the English Service and the Afrikaans Service, respectively. In 1985 the English Service was renamed Radio South Africa; it has had its current name, SAfm, since 1995. The SAfm studio is now in SABC Radio Park, in the Johannesburg suburb of Auckland Park.

== Programming ==
From 1995 to 2003, it gradually reduced the scope of its programming from a general, multi-genre format to a news and talk radio format. In 2006, the Independent Communications Authority of South Africa required SAfm to re-add drama and children's radio programmes, and these are now among the station's offerings. In 2012, SAfm was broadcasting 24 hours per day.

== Audience figures ==
Most SAfm listeners are in age range of 35 to 49, and LSM groups 7–10.

Estimated number of listeners
Month	7-day	Average Monday–Friday
May 2013	645,000	281,000
February 2013	566,000	263,000
December 2012	517,000	218,000
October 2012	516,000	218,000
August 2012	550,000	219,000
June 2012	540,000	221,000

== See also ==
- Channel Africa
- List of radio stations in South Africa
- Springbok Radio
