= Phalaphala FM =

Polokwane; South Africa
- Broadcast area: Limpopo
- Frequency: See table

Programming
- Format: Middle of the Road (MOR)

Ownership
- Owner: SABC

History
- First air date: 2 February 1965

Links
- Website: www.phalaphalafm.co.za

Phalaphala FM is a South African radio station operating through SABC, South Africa's government owned national broadcaster. Phalaphala FM broadcasts in the Venda language and can be received mainly in Gauteng and Limpopo provinces. The station's Music format is Middle of the Road Format (MOR) with Mid Tempo Bit.

== History ==
Phalaphala FM was born on 2 February 1965 and came into being after a merge between Radio Venda and Radio Thohoyandou in 1998. The two radio stations of different backgrounds with the one being Venda Bantustan origin and the other being a SABC public broadcaster. Radio Thohoyandou had a commercial wing which did broadcast in English and did not have the same license conditions as Radio Venda. The station broadcasts live from Polokwane or Thohoyandou SABC studios . its historical Djs Line up includes the legendary Mpho Nefale, Mbalavhali D, Terry 'Big Dude" Mudau, Dj Lagugga & Many More. It is also known for hosting the biggest music festival called Phalaphala Fm Royal Heritage Festival in Limpopo and throughout South Africa. The station broadcasts out of Limpopo in Tshivenda.

== Coverage and frequencies ==
Coverage Areas & Frequencies
Area	Freq. MHz
Pretoria	100.1
Johannesburg	107.8
Potgietersrus	103.1
Tzaneen	99.1
Louis Trichardt	90.7
Punda Maria	87.9
Sibasa	106.9
Gaba	88.2
Molema	93.0
Malamba	99.5
Mpzema	101.6
Mavhunga	104.7
Dzamba	93.3
Tshamavudzi	100.5
Thohoyandou	106.9 9
Musina	90.7

== Broadcast time ==
- 24/7

== Target audience ==
- Ages 16 – 24 (43%)
- Ages 25 – 34 (20%)
- Ages 35 – 49 (21%)
- Female (51%)
- Male (49%)
- LSM 1-4 (46.6%)
- LSM 5-6 (42.9%)
- LSM 7-10 (10.5%)

== Listenership figures ==
Estimated Listenership
	7 Day	Ave. Mon-Fri
May 2013	739 000	447 000
Feb 2013	1 024 000	579 000
Dec 2012	1 007 000	570 000
Oct 2012	969 000	543 000
Aug 2012	1 021 000	575 000
Jun 2012	1 031 000	599 000
