= Lotus FM =

South African radio station

South Africa
- Frequency: 87.7 - 106.8 MHz

Programming
- Format: Indian ethnic

Ownership
- Owner: SABC

History
- First air date: 1983

Links
- Website: http://www.lotusfm.co.za

Lotus FM (formerly, Radio Lotus) is a South African national radio station based in Durban, loosely similar to the BBC Asian Network in the United Kingdom, that caters for the needs of the Indian South African community. It combines a mix of Indian music, news, current affairs, interviews and entertainment. Lotus FM targets South African Indians between the ages of 25-34 (core) and 35-49 (secondary) in the LSM 7-10 segment.

Lotus FM has occasionally been the subject of complaints, with people of South Indian descent claiming that the station's broadcasts favour Hindi music over Tamil music.

The Lotus FM studio complex is based at the SABC in Durban, next to the famous Kingsmead Cricket stadium.

== Disc jockeys ==
The following is a list of On-Air Personalities who present and produce shows on the station (including weekends)

- Jovan Munsamy
- Rivash Soni
- Keshav Dass
- Trevor Williams
- Neelofar Sayed
- Zakia Ahmed Siddiqui
- Krsna Priya Dasa
- Romeo Chonco
- Jailoshini Naidoo
- Mala Lutchmanan
- Nicholas Pillay
- O'Neil Nair
- Pravina Maharaj
- Raeesa Mahomed
- Shaastra Nagasur
- Taliesha Naidoo
- Varshan Sookhun
- Mariam Khan
- Archana Shridhar
- Dhanaseelan Dorasamy
- Veena Lutchman
- Ashit Desai
- Niven Lalmund
- EB Mahmode
- MO Vawda
- Samantha Darsan
- Koobeshan Naidoo
- Tobani Dlamini
- Bhavna Govender
- Amahle Mkhize
- Bianca Lalbahadur

== Frequencies ==
The station broadcasts in FM on the following frequencies throughout South Africa

Coverage Areas & Frequencies
Area	Freq.
Durban	87.7 MHz
Ladysmith	87.9 MHz
Port Shepstone	88.2 MHz
Pietermaritzburg	88.3 MHz
North Coast	87.7
Durban North	89.4 MHz
Glencoe	90.0 MHz
Cape Town	97.8 MHz
Port Elizabeth	98.3 MHz
Pretoria	100.1 MHz
Johannesburg	106.8 MHz

== Listenership Figures ==
Estimated Listenership
	7 Day	Ave. Mon-Fri
May 2013	339 000	189 000
Feb 2013	323 000	186 000
Dec 2012	331 000	189 000
Oct 2012	323 000	181 000
Aug 2012	317 000	178 000
Jun 2012	331 000	187 000
