= Living Standards Measure =

Marketing and research tool

The Living Standards Measure or LSM is a marketing and research tool ( same as social economic class: SEC but more refined ) used in South Africa to classify standard of living and disposable income. It segments the population into ten deciles based on their relative means, with LSM 1 being the decile with the least means and 10 being the decile with the greatest means. It does this by ranking people based on ownership of the components of a standard basket of goods (which varies over time). For instance, those people who owned a television set would rank higher in the LSM than those who did not.

In effect, the LSM is an income inequality metric, despite specifically excluding income as one of the tested metric. Its components are reflective of the fact that South Africa has a high Gini coefficient.

== Current variables ==
The current (2015) basket of variables used to calculate LSM is:

- Metropolitan dweller (250 000+)
- Living in a non-urban area
- House / cluster house / town house
- Tap water in house / on plot
- Flush toilet inside house
- Hot running water
- Built in kitchen sink
- No domestic workers or gardeners
- Home security service
- 2 cellphones in household
- 3 or more cellphones in household
- Zero or one radio set in household
- Air conditioner (excl. fans)
- Television set(s)
- Swimming pool
- DVD player / Blu Ray player
- Refrigerator or combined fridge/freezer
- Electric stove
- Microwave oven
- Deep freezer – free standing
- Washing machine
- Tumble dryer
- Dishwasher
- PayTV (M-net / DSTV / TopTV) subscription
- Home theatre system
- Vacuum cleaner
- Motor vehicle in household
- Computer – desktop / laptop
- Land line telephone (excl. cellphone)
