= Gagasi 99.5 FM =

Radio station in Durban, South Africa

Gagasi FM

Durban; South Africa
- Broadcast area: Durban, KwaZulu-Natal
- Frequencies: 99.5 MHz; Pietermaritzburg: 98.5 MHz

Programming
- Format: Urban

Ownership
- Owner: MRC Media (PTY) Ltd
- Sister stations: Heart FM

History
- First air date: 13 March 2006
- Former names: P4 99.5 FM; P4 Radio Durban

Links
- Website: https://gagasiworld.co.za/

Gagasi FM (previously P4 99.5 FM or P4 Radio Durban) is a radio station broadcasting in Durban and surrounding areas in KwaZulu Natal, South Africa, specialising in R&B, Afro pop, hip hop, house and kwaito. As of May 2007 it had a listenership of approximately 10 million. The station launched on 13 March 2006. It claims to be the only English and Zulu radio station in the country.

The station had 1 million listeners during its first year of operation.

== Broadcast time ==
- 24/7

== Listenership figures ==
Estimated listenership
| | 7-day | Avg. Mon-Fri |
| May 2013 | 1,791,000 | 801,000 |
| Feb 2013 | 1,769,000 | 833,000 |
| Dec 2012 | 1,736,000 | 796,000 |
| Oct 2012 | 1,765,000 | 824,000 |
| Aug 2012 | 1,778,000 | 777,000 |
| Jun 2012 | 1,836,000 | 795,000 |
