= Smile 90.4FM =

North West FM
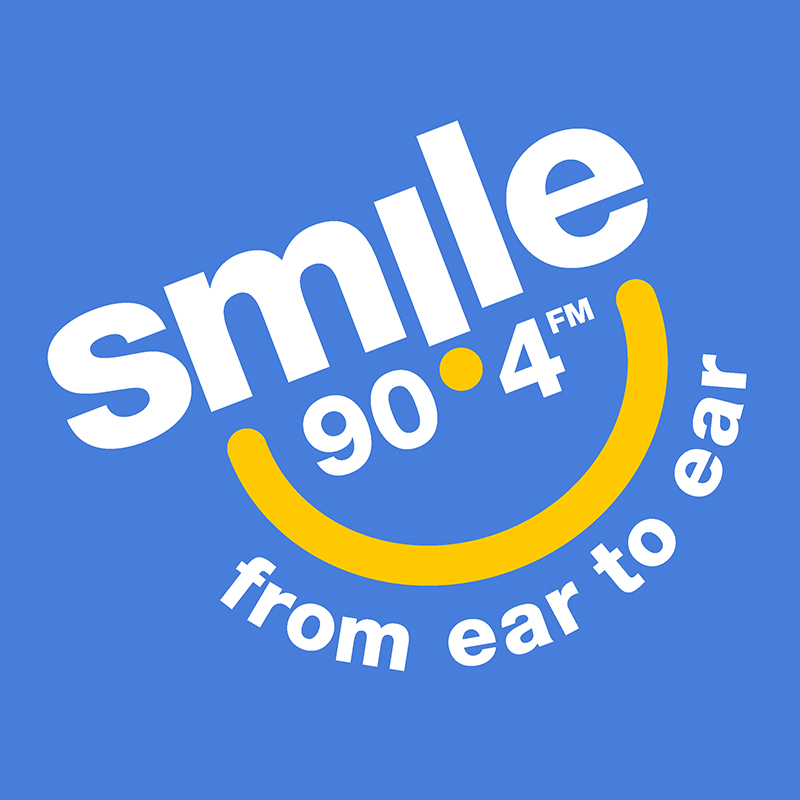

South Africa
- Broadcast area: Cape Town, South Africa
- Frequency: 90.4 FM

Programming
- Format: Adult Contemporary and Pop Hits

Ownership
- Owner: Private

Links
- Website: smilefm.co.za

Smile 90.4FM is a South African private commercial radio station based in Cape Town in the Western Cape. It mainly plays music from the 1980s, along with South African music. It launched in 2013.

== Broadcast Languages ==
- English
- Afrikaans

== Target Audience ==
- Age Group 35 – 49
