= Heart 104.9 FM =

South Africa
- Broadcast area: Cape Town, South Peninsula, Stellenbosch, Paarl, The Helderberg Basin and Langebaan
- Frequency: 104.9 MHz

Programming
- Format: Rhythmic CHR

History
- First air date: July 1997
- Former call signs: P4

Links
- Webcast: http://www.1049.fm/live-stream/
- Website: http://www.1049.fm/

Heart 104.9 FM is a 24-hour music radio station based in Green Point, Cape Town, South Africa. It is known as "Cape Town's Beat".

Heart FM broadcasts throughout the greater Western Cape region, including Cape Town (104.9 FM) and surrounding areas such as the Drakenstein (102.7 FM), West Coast (106.3 FM), Swartland (106.3 FM), Overberg (88.1 FM), and Overstrand (88.8 FM).

== About ==
Heart FM broadcasts in the greater Western Cape region including Cape Town and surrounding areas including the Drakenstein, West Coast, Swartland, Overberg and Overstrand.

The station attracts more than 634 000 listeners weekly (RAMS 2015/1) with its mix of jazz, soul, pop, old school, house and disco, old and new. There is also talk radio and entertainment spanning across shows.

Heart FM broadcasts in English and Afrikaans.

== History ==
Heart 104.9 FM was originally launched as P4 radio in July 1997. Then P4 radio was considered one of the fastest growing radio stations in South Africa at the time. P4 Radio was the first radio station in South Africa to target and attract high-income earners from the Black and Coloured communities of South Africa and it experienced positive growth in both revenue and audience. 8 years after inception P4 radio was re-launched as Heart 104.9 FM with the tag line 'Cape Town Soul'. Prior to the name change, research among the listeners found that they had no strong attachment to the name and didn't mind it changing. IBy 2014, it had become one of the largest radio stations in Cape Town and was often referred to as "Cape Town’s Beat". In 2013, the station increased their frequency to cover the Western Cape.

== Team of DJs ==
The station’s current line-up includes:

The Week Day Wake up with KB (Weekdays 4am-6am), Heart Breakfast with Aden Thomas (Weekdays 6am-9am) featuring Tapfuma Makina (sport) and Julian Naidoo (traffic), 9-12 with Irma G (Weekdays 9am-12pm), Lunchbox with Clarence Ford (Weekdays 12pm - 3pm) and Me Time with Clarence Ford Sunday's (6pm - 10pm), Drive 326 with Suga featuring Jeremy Harris on sport and Jo-Dee Butler on traffic, In the Mix with Diggy Bongz (Mon-Thur 6pm - 10pm), The Nightshift with JP Carelse (Sun - Thur 10 pm - 1am)

Weekends

The Heart Beat with Tyrone Paulsen (Fri & Sat 6pm - 10pm) The Weekend Party with Lunga Singama (Fri 10pm - 1 am), The Weekend Party With JP Carelse (Sat 10pm - 1am)

Saturday Breakfast with Jo-Dee Butler(6-9am), OTC (On the Couch) with Jeremy Harris (Saturday 9-10am), The CTM Heart Top 40 with Paul Playdon (Saturday 10am - 2pm), Lunga Singama (Saturday 2pm - 6pm), All Request Breakfast with Paul Playdon (Sunday 6am - 10am), Sunday Lunch with Lunga Singama (10am -2pm), Sound of Sunday with Irma G (2pm - 6pm), Me Time with Clarence Ford (6pm - 10pm)

== Events ==
Heart FM has three signature annual events namely, Mommy and Me, #HeartBeats4Youth and Women At Heart

- Mommy and Me is an annual event celebrating mothers and children, traditionally held in the lead-up to Mother's Day in May.
- #HeartBeats4Youth is a celebration of youth to coincide with Youth Month in June. The aim is to motivate, inspire and lend a hand where needed for the youth of the Western Cape. What started out at celebrities inspiring schools with motivational talks has morphed into a fully fledged 16-day campaign in 2015.
- Women At Heart is an annual celebration of women and takes place in August each year. Heart FM provides 600 women with a day of food, entertainment, and pampering.

== Topics ==
- #AR2L - Always Remember to Live: The #HeartBreakfast team had a Motto Monday where listeners and presenters were asked to share their life mottos. Always Remember To Live was the motto of sport presenter Tapfuma Makina. #AR2L generated a trend on Twitter as listeners got behind the saying
- Heart Relay Event: Following the win of Wayde Van Niekerk who holds the World Record for the 400m sprint, the #HeartBreakfast team came up with an annual Heart Relay Event where they challenged the #Drive326 team to a run off. The breakfast team won the event.

Estimated Listenership
	7 Day	Ave. Mon-Fri
RAMS 2015/1	634 000	
