= Fine Music Radio =

Classical music and jazz radio station in Cape Town, South Africa

Coordinates: 33°55′12″S 18°25′49″E

South Africa
- Broadcast area: Western Cape
- Frequency: 94.7 / 97.1 / 107.9 / 101.3 MHz

Links
- Website: https://www.fmr.co.za/

Fine Music Radio is a radio station that is based within the Artscape Theatre Centre in Cape Town, South Africa. Founded in 1995, Fine Music Radio focuses mainly on classical music and jazz, and broadcasts on frequencies 101.3 in the greater Cape Town area - 107.9 in Noordhoek and Fish Hoek - 94.7 in Hout Bay and Llandudno - 97.1 on the Atlantic seaboard. The station also live streams its programming.

== Listenership figures ==
Estimated Listenership
	7 Day
Feb 2015	43 000
Oct 2014	35 000
May 2013	18 000
Feb 2013	22 000
Dec 2012	30 000
Oct 2012	33 000
Aug 2012	33 000
Jun 2012	31 000
