= Metro FM =

South African radio station

- South Africa
- Broadcast area: South Africa, broadcast nationwide
- Frequencies: Regional (varies) & DAB+ Trial In Johannesburg, Pretoria & Cape Town

Programming
- Format: Urban contemporary

Ownership
- Owner: SABC

History
- First air date: October 1986

Links
- Webcast: www.metrofm.co.za

Metro FM is a national commercial radio station in South Africa owned by the South African Broadcasting Corporation. The station broadcasts on FM Stereo as well as the DStv Bouquet Channel 801. Telephone :

== History ==
The station started broadcasting in October, 1986 as Radio Metro to compete with the now defunct Radio Bop. Playing a mix of urban contemporary and bubblegum pop Radio Bop was able to reach black audiences in parts of the Transvaal by broadcasting on the AM band from the "independent" bantustan of Bophuthatswana where it was licensed. This prompted the SABC's then white management to launch Radio Metro which was put on air in about six months, from the planning stages.

The station launched the careers of a number of radio celebrities including, Bob Mabena, Shado Twala, Treasure Tshabalala and Lawrence Dube.

Over the years the station has had a number of competitors, including in the very competitive Johannesburg radio market where two stations, Kaya FM and YFM, launched in mid/late 1990s have taken away some audience from Metro FM.

Metro sponsors the Metro FM Music Awards, the 2016 edition being the 15th. Known as Mabhena FM.

== Broadcast time ==
- 24/7

== Listenership figures ==
Estimated Listenership
	7 Day	Ave. Mon-Fri
May 2013	5 713 000	2 110 000
Feb 2013	5 722 000	2 143 000
Dec 2012	5 763 000	2 171 000
Oct 2012	6 013 000	2 223 000
Aug 2012	6 252 000	2 317 000
Jun 2012	6 423 000	2 432 000
