= Motsweding FM =

- Mahikeng; South Africa
- Broadcast area: Mmabatho

Ownership
- Owner: SABC

History
- First air date: 1 June 1962

Links
- Website: www.motswedingfm.co.za

Motsweding FM is an SABC radio station based in Mahikeng, South Africa, broadcasting mainly in the Tswana language. Formerly known as Radio Tswana, the country-wide broadcast station evolved from a Bophuthatswana Broadcasting Corporation, which had been operating from Mmabatho in the former Bophuthatswana homeland.

Motsweding FM plays a wide variety of music, to help increase listenership throughout South Africa's dynamic cultures. At any time, a mixture of hip-hop/pop/soft rock can be mixed with house music followed by Simphiwe Dana or Madonna and ending with Freshlyground or Mo'Molemi.

In addition, Motsweding FM also does talkshows, where presenters talk about current events, and issues faced by the Tswana-speaking community.

== Broadcasting time ==
- 24/7

== Listenership figures ==
Estimated Listenership
	7 Day	Ave. Mon-Fri
May 2013	3 162 000	1 746 000
Feb 2013	3 204 000	1 765 000
Dec 2012	3 141 000	1 774 000
Oct 2012	3 182 000	1 817 000
Aug 2012	3 251 000	1 869 000
Jun 2012	3 180 000	1 841 000
