= Good Hope FM =

- South Africa
- Broadcast area: South Africa
- Frequencies: 94 - 97 MHz & DAB+ 13F In Cape Town

Programming
- Format: Contemporary Hit Radio (CHR)

Ownership
- Owner: SABC

History
- First air date: 1965

Links
- Website: http://www.goodhopefm.co.za/

Good Hope FM is an SABC regional radio station for Cape Town, which was launched in 1965. It broadcasts in the contemporary hit radio format containing news, current affairs, traffic and sport information, features, and a music mix of R&B, pop, hip hop and dance. It targets young, global, routed and "now generation" listeners. Its footprint covers the Cape including the city, surrounding towns and villages the Overberg and Plettenberg Bay. The station has a target audience of LSM 6-9, 22-32 year olds.

It contributes to the development of South African music and local content through a consistent delivery according to ICASA guidelines and expectations. The station has regular interviews with local artists and supports the local music industry. It broadcasts predominantly in English with English/Afrikaans news, traffic reports and commercials.

== Coverage and frequencies ==
The Good Hope FM broadcast footprint covers Cape Town metropolis and surrounding suburbs, towns and villages and also extends to the Overberg and Plettenberg Bay regions. The surrounding towns and villages include Langebaan, Saldanha Bay, Malmesbury, Paarl, Wellington, Worcester, Franschhoek, Stellenbosch and Gordon's Bay.

Transmitters and frequencies:
Site name	Frequency
Simons Town	93.9 MHz
Franschhoek	93.9 MHz
Paarl	94.8 MHz
Stellenbosch	94.1 MHz
Tygerberg	96.2 MHz
Constantia Berg	95.3 MHz
Table Mountain	95.3 MHz
Sea Point	96.7 MHz
Overberg	90.9 MHz
Hermanus	91.9 MHz
Riviersonderend	90.2 MHz
Plettenberg Bay	91.3 MHz

== Broadcast Languages ==
- English (predominantly)
- Afrikaans (sometimes)

== Broadcast time ==
24 hours a day, 365 days a year.

== Listenership figures ==
Estimated listenership
	7 Day	1 Day
Feb'22-Jan'23	698,000	266,000
