= Ukhozi FM =

Programming
- Language: Zulu
- Format: Adult contemporary

Ownership
- Owner: SABC
- Sister stations: Umhlobo Wenene FM

History
- First air date: 1960

Ukhozi FM is a South African national radio station & owned by SABC, based in Durban, KwaZulu-Natal that caters to the needs of the Zulu-speaking community. Founded in 1960, it is the largest radio station in South Africa and Africa (by listenership). The station has a broadcasting licence from ICASA.

Ukhozi means "eagle" in Zulu.

== Coverage areas and frequencies ==
- KwaZulu-Natal
- Gauteng
- Mpumalanga
- North-eastern parts of Eastern Cape
- Eastern parts of Free State
- Eastern parts of North West
- Southern parts of Limpopo

Coverage Areas & Frequencies
TX Station	MHz	Pol
Donnybrook	92,7	V
Durban	90,8	H/V
DurbanNorth	92,5	V
Eshowe	93,4	V
Glencoe	93,1	V
Greytown	91,7	V
Ladysmith	91,0	H
Mooi River	92,2	V
Nongoma	92,9	V
Pietermaritzburg	91,4	V
Port Shepstone	91,3	V
The Bluff	92,0	H
Ubombo	92,4	V
Vryheid	91,2	V

== Broadcast languages ==
- IsiZulu

== Broadcast time ==
- 24/7

== Target audience ==
The station caters to people ranging from young to elderly, however it focuses on the youth.

== Listenership figures ==
Estimated Listenership
	7 Day	Ave. Mon-Fri
Oct 2014	7 859 000	4 787 000
Aug 2014	7 616 000	4 585 000
Jun 2014	7 623 000	4 671 000
Nov 2013	7 711 000	4 705 000
Aug 2013	7 426 000	4 637 000
Jun 2013	7 122 000	4 437 000
May 2013	7 132 000	4 450 000
Feb 2013	7 031 000	4 336 000
Dec 2012	6 798 000	4 194 000
Oct 2012	6 889 000	4 217 000
Aug 2012	7 289 000	4 461 000
Jun 2012	7 188 000	4 385 000
