= Ligwalagwala FM =

South African radio station

Nelspruit; South Africa
- Frequency: 87.7 - 104.0 FM

Ownership
- Owner: SABC

History
- First air date: 1982

Links
- Website: ligwalagwalafm.co.za

Ligwalagwala FM is a South African national PBS radio station based in Mbombela, South Africa.

== History ==
The year 2008 marked the rebirth of the station by launching a brand new, vibrant, jubilant and dynamic image. The launch of the new logo was ceremoniously followed by the station's birthday bash which was voted concert of the year by the Saturday Star newspaper.

Achievements : SABC Gospel Crow Awards, PMR Awards, 2008 – Birthday Bash voted concert of the year by Saturday Star, 2008 – Top 10 Favourite Radio Station, 2013 – Top 10 Favourite Radio Station, 2012 – Best Gospel Radio Show, 2005 – Diamond Arrow, 2007 – Diamond Arrow, 2013 – Diamond Arrow,

== Music format ==
- Local Music (70%)
- International Music (30%)
- House Ntombe mhlophe(18%)
- Kwaito (16%)
- Gospel (15%)
- R&B (13%)
- Worl Music (9%)
- South African Hip hop (8%)
- Afro Pop
- Choral
- Contemporary Jazz
- Reggae
- Maskandi/Mbaqanga

== Coverage areas and frequencies ==
- Mpumalanga
- Parts of Gauteng
- Kwa-Zulu Natal
- Limpopo
- North West

Coverage Areas & Frequencies
Area	Freq.
Carolina	93 MHz
Davel	91.3 MHz
Dullstroom	90.8 MHz
Hectorspruit	87.7 MHz
Hoedspruit	104 MHz
Lydenburg	92.8 MHz
Mbuzini	93.7 MHz
Middelburg	103.8 MHz
Nelspruit	92.5 MHz
Pretoria	89.3 MHz
Volksrust	89.5 MHz
Nelspruit	92.5 MHz

== Broadcast languages ==
- siSWATI

== Broadcast time ==
- 24/7

== Target audience ==
Target Audience
	Core Audience	Secondary Audience
Age	18 - 35	35 - 50+
Age	16 - 24	25 - 49
LSM	1 - 5	5 - 8
Gender	Male / Female	Female
Geographical Penetration	Mpumalanga & Limpopo	Gauteng

== Listenership figures ==
Estimated Listenership
	7 Day	Ave. Mon-Fri
May 2013	1 294 000	711 000
Feb 2013	1 081 000	561 000
Dec 2012	1 129 000	596 000
Oct 2012	1 216 000	640 000
Aug 2012	1 405 000	733 000
Jun 2012	1 391 000	737 000
