= Radio 2000 =

South African radio station

- South Africa
- Broadcast area: South Africa
- Frequencies: FM: 97.2 – 100 MHz & DAB+ 13F In Johannesburg, Pretoria & Cape Town

Programming
- Format: Music, news, sport

Ownership
- Owner: SABC

History
- First air date: 1986

Links
- Website: Radio2000.co.za

Radio 2000 is a South African national radio station. Owned by the South African Broadcasting Corporation (SABC), and based in Johannesburg, it broadcasts nationally between 97.2, and 100 FM. It is one of several radio stations in South Africa that broadcasts live sport reports.

When it was established in July 1986, Radio 2000 would "simulcast" the original soundtracks of television programmes which were dubbed in Afrikaans, thereby catering for English speakers who wished to watch them in the original language.

== Coverage areas & frequencies ==
- National (97.2 - 100.0 FM)
- DAB+ Terrestrial in Cape Town frequency 13F

== Broadcast languages ==
- English

== Broadcast time ==
- 24/7

== Target audience ==
- LSM Groups 7 – 10

== Listenership figures ==
Estimated Listenership
	7 Day	Ave. Mon-Fri
Feb 2013	890 000	297 000
Dec 2012	860 000	285 000
Oct 2012	857 000	289 000
Aug 2012	823 000	282 000
Jun 2012	790 000	266 000
