= Ikwekwezi FM =

iKwekwezi FM

Pretoria; South Africa
- Frequency: 90.6 - 107.7

Ownership
- Owner: SABC

History
- First air date: 1 April 1983
- Former call signs: Radio Ndebele

Links
- Website: http://www.ikwekwezifm.co.za/

iKwekwezi FM (previously Radio Ndebele) is a South African national radio station based in Johannesburg in the Gauteng province broadcasting in the Southern Ndebele language.The most popular presenters are the current station manager Philip ThizaThiza Mahlangu and Mbuzana Nyathi. A powerful sports commentator and anchor of this station is Lucky Professor Mahlangu. The station was advocated by the late Pinky Mabona and Nofanezile Matjhiyana.

== History ==
=== Founded ===
Ikwekwezi FM, previously known as Radio Ndebele, was founded on 1 January 1983. As this was a New Year's Day, workers first reported for duty on the first working day of the year.

=== First airing ===
It was first heard in the FM 93.6 (Nylstroom) transmitter on 1 April 1983 after a three-month staff induction. The first continuity presenter was David Malatsi and the first news reader was Mandla Masanabo.

=== Location ===
The Station was then housed at the SABC Northern Transvaal Region, based at Minnaar Street in Pretoria. It later relocated to Weavind Park also in Pretoria, then to Auckland Park in Johannesburg, based in Hatfield, Tshwane and now it is currently at Auckland Park in Johannesburg again, as of 2021.

=== Staff ===
The staff consisted of the management team, announcers, operations assistance, a translator, music compiler, typist clerk and station secretary. Technical staff belonged and reported directly to the station. News and current affairs were presented by the station announcers on a rotational basis as per time table specifications. The station management had full editorial rights.

=== Program format ===
The program format was to educate, inform and entertain with the aim to promoting isiNdebele language to a written language. The staff all studied isiZulu at school because isiNdebele was then not offered at schools. The radio station participated in language development through its program format and participated in the then isiNdebele Language Board by designating a representative to attend all language sittings. isiNdebele language was first introduced in schools at Sub Standard A (Grade 1) in 1985. The first authors were Language Board members, inclusive of station representatives; viz. Batjeleni Skosana and Peter Mahlangu. The station logo was then "Sikhuluma Isikhethu" meaning: "We Speak Our Language".

=== Change of the slogan ===
In 1986 the station slogan was changed to "Ikulethela Ubuhle Obunethabo" meaning: Radio Ndebele "Brings you the beauty of joy.". The slogan was based on the argument that the station would change people's lives for the better in terms of socio-economic development.

=== Radio transformation ===
Since the new dispensation in 1994, there started a process of transforming the radio stations from being ethnic based to be reflective of the country's rainbow nation. That process was then effected in 1996, when Radio Ndebele was changed to be named "iKwekwezi FM" (meaning "The Star") with the slogan "Lapho Sikhona Kunokukhanya" ("Wherever we are there is Light"). It was during the era of the first audience representative as the station manager; i.e. Oupa Mahlangu, one of the first announcers. His successor is the current station manager, Phillip Mahlangu who went through the ranks of the station.

== Coverage areas and frequencies ==
The station broadcasts in these areas and in FM on the following frequencies throughout South Africa.

- Mpumalanga (i.e. Highveld & Eastveld)
- Gauteng
- Limpopo
- Parts of the North West

Coverage Areas & Frequencies
Location	Freq. (MHz)
Gembokspruit	97.3
Dullstroom	107.7
Gauteng	106.3
Modimolle	90.6
Kameeldrift	96.8
Kwa-Mhlanga	93.8
Potgietersrus	104.1
Middelburg	91.8
Davel	94.5

KWAZULU NATAL |109.7-107.7

== Broadcast languages ==
- Ndebele

== Broadcast time ==
- 24/7

== Target audience ==
- LSM groups 4–7
- Primary: ages 25–49
- Secondary: ages 16–24

== Listenership figures ==
Estimated Listenership
	7 Day	Ave. Mon-Fri
May 2013	1 560 000	856 000
Feb 2013	1 541 000	755 000
Dec 2012	1 604 000	785 000
Oct 2012	1 603 000	784 000
Aug 2012	1 663 000	820 000
Jun 2012	1 734 000	852 000
