= Thobela FM =

- South Africa
- Frequency: 87.6 - 92.1 MHz

Programming
- Format: Contemporary

Ownership
- Owner: SABC

History
- First air date: 1960

Links
- Website: http://www.thobelafm.co.za/

Thobela FM is the contemporary voice of Sepedi speaking/understanding South Africans.

== Coverage and frequencies ==
The station broadcasts in these areas and in FM on the following frequencies throughout South Africa.

Coverage Areas & Frequencies
Area	Freq.
Blouberg	89.2
Johannesburg	90.1
Mokopane	88.3
Dullstroom	87.7
Louis Trichardt	87.6
Pretoria	87.9
Haenertsburg	90.3
Middelburg	88.7
Thabazimbi	91.9
Hoedspruit	88.9
Nylstroom	89.8
Tzaneen	89.5

== Broadcast time ==
- 24/7

== Target Audience ==
- LSM Groups 4 – 8
- Age Group 16 - 49

To update and entertain a wide quantity of people from anywhere in South Africa

== Programme Format ==
- 60% Music
- 40% Talk

== Listenership Figures ==
Estimated Listenership
	7 Day	Ave. Mon-Fri
May 2013	2 975 000	1 817 000
Feb 2013	3 314 000	2 000 000
Dec 2012	3 198 000	1 917 000
Oct 2012	3 119 000	1 884 000
Aug 2012	2 732 000	1 478 000
Jun 2012	2 798 000	1 494 000
Mar 2024		
