= Radio Sonder Grense =

RSG
- South Africa
- Broadcast area: South Africa Broadcast Nationwide (via, repeaters)
- Frequencies: 100-104 FM & DAB+ In Johannesburg, Pretoria & Cape Town

Programming
- Format: PBS Full Service

Ownership
- Owner: SABC

History
- First air date: 1937

Links
- Website: www.rsg.co.za

Radio Sonder Grense (RSG), i.e. Radio Without Borders, is an Afrikaans-language radio service run by the South African Broadcasting Corporation for the whole of South Africa. Since Afrikaans is one of South Africa's 11 official languages, the SABC is required to carry an Afrikaans-language service on both radio and television. RSG is the radio part of this Afrikaans-language service. RSG broadcasts mostly on FM utilizing transmitters owned and operated by Sentech, the former signal distribution division of the SABC.

RSG was launched as the SABC's "B" service in 1937 - one year after the inception of the Corporation and its "A" service (English) in 1936. It was known as the "Afrikaanse Diens van die SAUK" (Afrikaans Service of the SABC) for many years until the Corporation restructured its entire radio portfolio in 1986 and it became known as "Radio Suid-Afrika". In the early 1990s it changed its name to "Afrikaans Stereo" and then took on its slogan "Radio Sonder Grense" as name after the 1996 SABC Radio restructure during which each one of the language services dropped the name of the actual language out of the station names.

RSG was a publisher of a chart of the best-selling CD albums in South Africa called SA Top 20.

The station opted to start a multimedia platform for radio, TV, internet and WAP broadcasts in May 2000.

== Broadcast time ==
- 24/7

== Listenership figures ==
Estimated Listenership
	7 Day	Ave. Mon-Fri
May 2013	1 852 000	1 106 000
Feb 2013	1 741 000	1 075 000
Dec 2012	1 710 000	1 066 000
Oct 2012	1 735 000	1 084 000
Aug 2012	1 886 000	1 157 000
Jun 2012	1 935 000	1 164 000

== See also ==
- Amore Bekker (RSG radio personality).
