= Algoa FM =

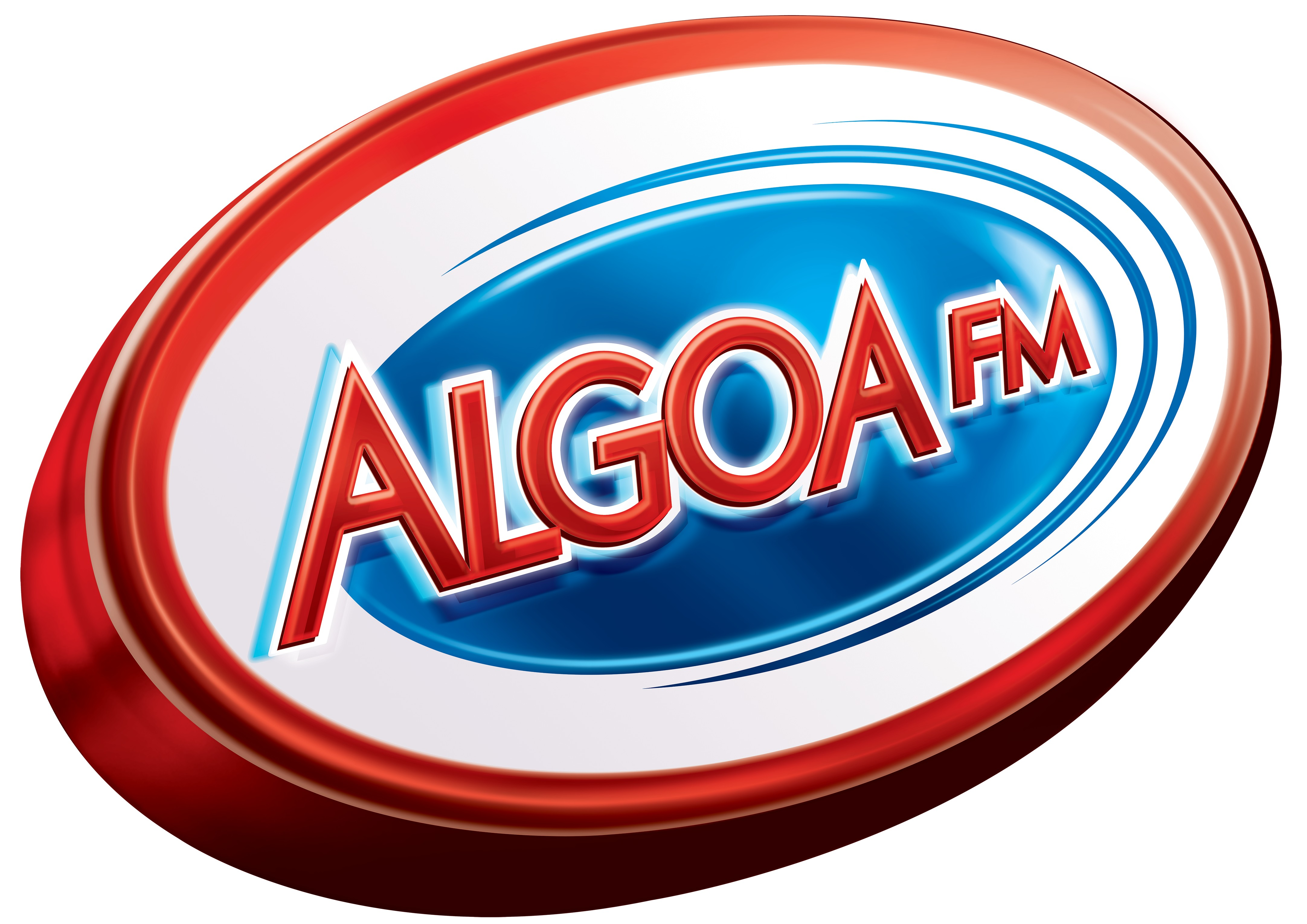
- Gqeberha; South Africa
- Frequency: 94.0 to 97.0 MhZ (FM)

Programming
- Format: The station connects with adults who enjoy good music and indulge in quality life experiences from the Garden Route to the Wild Coast, and inland through the Karoo.

Ownership
- Owner: Umoya Communications (Pty) Ltd

History
- First air date: January 1, 1986

Technical information
- Licensing authority: ICASA

Links
- Website: https://www.algoafm.co.za/

Algoa FM is the main South African commercial radio station serving the Eastern Cape province and Garden Route. It started broadcasting on 1 January 1986 as part of the South African Broadcasting Corporation (SABC). It was privatised in October 1996. Algoa FM is licensed by the Independent Communications Authority of South Africa.

== Corporate ==
Algoa FM is a subsidiary of Africa Media Entertainment (AME), which was established in 1997, and is listed on the Johannesburg Stock Exchange.

== Footprint ==
Algoa FM reaches through the Eastern Cape and Garden Route, from Mossel Bay to Barkly East and as far north as Colesberg. Algoa FM's on-air audience stretches from the Garden Route through to the Wild Coast, and inland through the Karoo Hinterland. It is also available on DStv Channel 837. The station is celebrating its 40th year in broadcasting during 2026.
