= Kaya FM =

- Johannesburg; South Africa
- Frequency: 95.9 MHz FM

Programming
- Format: Urban/Jazz/African Indigenous

History
- First air date: August 1997

Links
- Website: https://www.kaya959.co.za/

Kaya 959, formerly known as Kaya FM 95.9, is a commercial radio station that broadcasts from Johannesburg, Gauteng, South Africa.

== History ==
Kaya 959 was launched in August 1997, and was one of the first frequencies to be approved for private commercial radio in South Africa. The station format is 60% music and 40% talk, thus making it unique to other ICASA approved licences.

== Format and listeners ==
According to its website, the current listenership stands at 628 000 per average day. Most of the target audience of Kaya 959 resides in the urban areas. The music format offers a mix including Adult Contemporary music and Rhythm and Blues, Soul, and Contemporary Jazz. It also includes African Indigenous Genre to its sound. Kaya 959 programming contains news, sport, and topical driven issues as well.

== Footprint ==
- Greater Johannesburg Metropolis
- Northern Boundary: Pretoria Boundary
- Eastern Boundary: East Rand
- Southern Boundary: Vanderbijlpark
- Western Boundary: Carletonville

== Broadcast time ==
- 24/7

== Listener figures ==
Estimated Listenership
	Ave. 7 Day Mon-Sun
2018'3	865 000
2018'2	897 000
2018'1	899 000
2017'4	953 000
2017'3	979 000
2017'2	931 000
