= Nic Marais =

Kfm Breakfast with Nic Marais
- Genre: Zoo
- Running time: 3 hours per show Monday through Friday
- Country of origin: South Africa
- Home station: 94.5 Kfm
- Starring: Nic Marais; Mel Jones; Deon Bing; Wesley Peterson; Darren Simpson; Dingo Dave Marshall; Survivor Jean; Alan Committie
- Executive producer(s): Ian Bredenkamp, Lance Witten, Steve Werner
- Original release: 28 January 2002 – 27 June 2008
- No. of episodes: ±1,500

Nic Marais (born 6 June 1980) is a former South African radio personality. Marais hosted Kfm Breakfast from January 2002 to June 2008. His remains the most listened-to breakfast show in Cape Town's history with 1.3 million weekly listeners. During his time on radio, he conducted numerous high-profile interviews with local and international politicians and celebrities. These included Nobel Prize laureates Nelson Mandela, Desmond Tutu and F.W. de Klerk, and movie stars Charlize Theron and Morgan Freeman.

He is a member of the Yale Law School class of 2011. In 2011, he took top honors in the final round of the Thomas Swan Barristers' Union Mock Trial Competition at Yale Law School; he was awarded the John Fletcher Caskey Prize for best presentation of a case on final trial.

Marais now resides in San Francisco, California United States. He is an attorney at the law firm, Keker, Van Nest & Peters, a litigation boutique.
