= Debora Patta =

South African broadcast journalist and editor

- Born: 1 September 1964 (age 62); Southern Rhodesia (now Zimbabwe)
- Education: University of Cape Town
- Occupations: Senior Foreign Correspondent, Broadcast journalist, television producer, radio personality
- Years active: 1990–
- Spouses: Mweli Mzizi (m. 1996–2002) Lance Levitas (m. 2003–2011)
- Partner: Andrew Levy (2012–)
- Children: 2

Debora Patta (born 1 September 1964) is a South African investigative broadcast journalist and television producer, who served as a foreign correspondent for CBS News in the United States (since 2013) until in 2025, when she was laid off alongside eight other female on air personalities by incoming editor-in-chief, Bari Weiss. She was previously the host of the long-running e.tv investigative and current affairs program 3rd Degree with Debora Patta.

== Early life ==
Patta was born in Southern Rhodesia (now Zimbabwe), where her Italian father had emigrated as a railway employee. Her father was from Rome, Italy and she lived there for a while when she was young. Her Italian family is originally from Praia a Mare in Calabria. She considers Italy her second home and travels there regularly.

She moved to South Africa with her mother, a nurse and devout Catholic, and her sister in 1976 after her parents divorced. She attended Rustenburg School for Girls in the Rondebosch suburb of Cape Town, where she matriculated in 1981.

Patta studied at the University of Cape Town where she obtained a Bachelor of Social Sciences in 1984. She briefly taught aerobics while at college.

== Career ==
After graduating from college, Patta worked as a political activist teaching literacy in Cape Town's squatter camps until 1990, when she started working as a freelance reporter for the BBC.

=== Radio ===
Patta joined Radio 702 in Johannesburg as a reporter in 1990 and worked her way up to news editor in 1994 and special assignments editor in 1997.

The first news story she worked on that was aired on Radio 702 was about the return of ANC leader Oliver Tambo from exile in December 1990.

In 1997 and 1998, while working as news and special assignments editor for Radio 702 and its sister station Cape Talk, she investigated and reported on the 1986 plane crash in which Mozambican President Samora Machel was killed. She received several threatening phone calls during the investigation. In June 1998 she participated in a post-apartheid Truth and Reconciliation Commission special hearing, providing expert opinion and assisting with questioning regarding the 1987 Helderberg plane crash and the Machel plane crash. She was later interviewed for a 2008 Mayday (Air Crash Investigation or Air Emergency) documentary on the Helderberg plane crash.

In October 2013, Patta returned to Radio 702 as a stand-in talk radio host.

=== Television ===
Patta has worked for e.tv, the first privately owned free-to-air television station in South Africa, since its inception in 1998. She started as a senior correspondent in Johannesburg and was subsequently appointed chief anchor of e.tv news.

From 2000 to 2013, she was the executive producer and anchor of the weekly current affairs television programme 3rd Degree, a show conceptualized by her which focused on hard-hitting interviews. The final episode of 3rd Degree aired on 14 May 2013.

She has reported on major international stories such as the September 11 attacks and the death of Diana, Princess of Wales and has interviewed many notable individuals including Shimon Peres, Oprah Winfrey, Nelson Mandela, Thabo Mbeki, Jacob Zuma, Cyril Ramaphosa, Julius Malema, Eugène Terre'Blanche and Robert McBride.

She was appointed editor-in-chief of e.tv news in 2005. In 2009 she resigned her position as editor-in-chief, "to follow her passion for journalism" and focus on 3rd Degree.

She played a key role in the launch of South Africa's first 24-hour news channel eNews Channel Africa (eNCA) by e.tv in 2008.

In 2012, a puppet version of Patta voiced by Nikki Jackman was cast as co-host of the satirical television news programme ZANEWS.

On 7 May 2013, e.tv and eNCA announced that Debora Patta had resigned "to pursue other interests as a freelancer for international news companies".

==== CBS News ====
Following her departure from e.tv in 2013, Patta began working as a foreign correspondent for CBS News.

Since 2013, Patta has reported on important stories including the Ebola outbreaks in Africa, the Chibok schoolgirls kidnapping by Islamic terrorist organization Boko Haram, and the famine in South Sudan. Other notable stories include the ambush of American and Nigerian soldiers by Islamic militants (the Tongo Tongo ambush), child labor in Democratic Republic of the Congo cobalt mines, child labor in the Ghana fishing industry, and her ongoing coverage of the effects of climate change in Africa.

In 2020, Patta covered the effects of the COVID-19 pandemic In Africa.

In August 16, 2025, Patta’s reported on the ongoing war in Gaza. Other recent Patta stories include criticism of the Trump administration for its cuts to international aid programs. She is also critical of Israel’s Prime Minister Benjamin Netanyahu, and the President of the United States of America Donald Trump for their handling of the crisis in Gaza.

Patta was laid off during a major restructuring at CBS News following the Paramount–Skydance merger. The Johannesburg bureau, where she worked from, was subsequently closed, with some Africa coverage reassigned to London-based correspondents.

== Reporting style ==
Patta has been described as "direct", "to the point", "unafraid" and "being a voice for the voiceless":

South Africans know her best as the hard-core investigative reporter who ruthlessly rips into everyone from crooked cabinet ministers to medical doctors on the take.

— Louise Liebenberg, The Herald

Patta has been called names and is often described as aggressive, but it doesn't seem to bother her much.

— Bongiwe Khumalo, Times Live

Her hard-hitting journalism exposing racism in South Africa has angered conservative whites. Black members of the public have also accused her of being racist, e.g. after exposing corrupt black doctors who sold medical certificates and after interviewing "bling queen" Khanyi Mbau, and Jewish members of the public have accused her of being anti-Semitic after airing the controversial 2002 documentary Palestine Is Still the Issue.

She has also been criticized as not being qualified to talk about black culture by former ANC Youth League president Julius Malema during an interview with him and by black viewers offended by a 3rd Degree show on black hair weaves.

AWB leader Eugène Terre'Blanche walked out of an interview with Patta after his release from prison in 2004. A complaint lodged against e.tv about the interview was dismissed by the Broadcasting Complaints Commission of South Africa.

In 2010, Patta publicly apologized on television to Chrisna de Kock, a Freedom Front Plus youth leader at the University of the Free State, after accusing her of being a racist in an interview on 3rd Degree. An e.tv spokesperson conceded that "the manner in which the allegation was put across was unfortunate" and the racism comment was subsequently retracted.

Patta has responded to criticism of her reporting with statements such as "that means I am doing my job well" and "we are doing this because we have a true democracy".

== Personal life ==
In April 1995, Patta married Mweli Mzizi. The interracial couple had encountered hostility for a year, so she was surprised by the positive response of listeners to her announcement. They were married in January 1996 and the wedding was attended by hundreds of guests including Nelson Mandela. After the wedding the Department of Home Affairs notified Mzizi that the marriage was invalid because he did not fill out a form requiring black men to say that they were not already married. Newsweek reported that few South Africans were aware of this requirement and "many of the country's marriages are probably illegal in the eyes of the bureaucracy".

In 2000, Patta and Mzizi unsuccessfully attempted to enter a whites-only picnic resort in the Free State together, filming the incident on a hidden camera for a 3rd Degree show on racism following which Patta received hate mail.

Patta was voted one of the FHM 50 Most Eligible Women in the World by South African FHM readers in 2003.

In June 2003, she married Lance Levitas.

She has two daughters. Her elder daughter, Chiara Mzizi, has worked as a presenter for YoTV, a youth entertainment show broadcast by SABC 1, and was a student at the University of Cape Town.

As of 2019, Patta lived in Johannesburg with her youngest daughter, Ella, and her partner, Andrew Levy.

== Awards ==
Patta has won several awards:

- 1992 South African Checkers Journalist of the Year
- 2004 Vodacom Journalist of the Year Gauteng Region
- 2004 MTN 10 Most Remarkable Women in Media
- 2007 Simonsvlei Journalist Achiever of the Year
- 2009 Vodacom Women in the Media
- 2010 CEO Magazine South Africa's Most Influential Women in Business and Government
- 2010 She received a Tricolor Globe Award from the Italian Women in the World association which recognizes outstanding achievers of Italian origin abroad.
- 2015 She was part of the CBS News team nominated to receive an Emmy Award for their coverage of the Ebola virus epidemic in West Africa.

== Publications ==
- Baby Micaela : the inside story of South Africa's most famous abduction case. Co-authored by Anne Maggs and Debora Patta. Sandton: Zebra Press, 1996. ISBN 9781868700493.
- One step behind Mandela : the story of Rory Steyn, Nelson Mandela's chief bodyguard. Co-authored by Rory Steyn and Debora Patta. Rivonia: Zebra Press, 2000. ISBN 9781868722693
