= Nic Billington =

- Origin: Durban, South Africa
- Occupation(s): Singer, songwriter, model
- Website: www.nicbillington.co.za

Nic Billington is a singer, songwriter and model from Durban, South Africa. His debut album, Overload, was released in February 2013. The lead single, by the same name, reached number 5 on 94.7 Highveld Stereo and 94.5 Kfm's Take 40 SA.

Billington was discovered on YouTube by his record company, Clango Media. A few months later, they signed him on.

== Discography ==
=== Singles and Music Videos ===
- "Kiss" (2011)
- "Overload (Into the Wonderful)" (2012)
- "Overload" (2013)
- "Vixen" (2013)
- "Say It Right" (2013)
