= Jacaranda FM =

South African radio station

Coordinates: 25.9274°S 28.1436°E

- South Africa
- Broadcast area: Gauteng, Limpopo, Mpumalanga, North West
- Frequencies: 93.9–97.1 MHz FM

Programming
- Format: Adult Contemporary

Ownership
- Owner: Kagiso Media; Lagardère Active
- Sister stations: East Coast Radio; OFM; iGagasi 99.5fm; Kaya FM

History
- First air date: 1 January 1986
- Former names: Jacaranda 94.2

Technical information
- ERP: 110 kilowatts

Links
- Webcast: Listen live (via TuneIn)
- Website: Jacaranda FM Website

Jacaranda FM, previously known as Jacaranda 94.2, is a South African radio station, broadcasting in English and Afrikaans, with a footprint that covers Gauteng, Limpopo, Mpumalanga and the North West Province and boasts a listening audience of 2 million people a week and a digital community of more than 1.1 million people a month. The station's format is mainstream with programming constructed around a playlist of hit music from the 1980s, 1990s and now.

According to the latest official numbers from the South African Advertising Research Foundation released in 2014, Jacaranda FM used to be the no. 1 station among Afrikaans home language consumers in Gauteng province, and one of the top 10 stations in the country.

Jacaranda FM operates a regional transmitter split service from a studio in Mbombela. It can be heard in most of the Capricorn, Bushveld and Lowveld regions of the Limpopo Province as well as in the Mpumalanga Lowveld, notably Mbombela and the Kruger National Park. Split broadcasts occur each weekday from 12:00–16:00 and on Saturdays from 10:00–14:00. Morning and afternoon drive time newscasts are also fed to the regional audience.

== History ==
Jacaranda FM is named after the Jacaranda tree, a prominent tree in Pretoria and Johannesburg. The station started broadcasting at midnight on 1 January 1986 during a special outside broadcast from a New Year's Eve ball in the Pretoria City Hall. Radio Jakaranda/Radio Jacaranda was established as a result of the restructuring of the South African Broadcasting Corporation's regional radio portfolio following their decision to discontinue the popular Springbok Radio on 31 December 1985. The original three regional services, Radio Good Hope, Radio Port Natal and Radio Highveld were expanded with three new services - Radio Jacaranda, Radio Oranje and Radio Algoa. Jacaranda's transmitting signal was upgraded to stereo in 1990 - coupled with a name change to Jakaranda Stereo/Jacaranda Stereo. In 1994, the name was changed again to Jacaranda 94-97. The original location was Studio RS9 at SABC Northern Transvaal Broadcasting Services in Weavind Park, Pretoria until a move to a highly visible location next to the N1 Ben Schoeman Freeway on Samrand Avenue, Centurion, when the station was privatised in 1997 - and renamed "Jacaranda 94.2 - More Music, More Stars/Meer Musiek, Meer Sterre". In 1999, the payoff line changed to "Your Soothing Companion/Jou Streler Speler", and currently is "More Music You Love".

Prominent past presenters of this radio station include: Maurice Carpede, Fanus Rautenbach, Willem Engelbrecht, Ben Theunissen, Helen Naudé, Theo Conradie, Tom Henderson, Alida Theron, Anelle Schotkamp-Hugo, Pierre Schnehage, Anton Schmidt, Derrich Gardner, Morné Zeelie, Elana Afrika-Bredenkamp, Kieno Kammies, Duncan Pollock, Clayton Robbertze, Darren Scott and Martin Bester.

Jacaranda FM is part of Kagiso Media, South Africa's biggest black-owned media company. Jacaranda FM is the group's top performer and is currently South Africa's number 1 independent radio station by weekly audience figures (2,089,000 weekly listeners - RAMS June 2014)

Radio legend Alan Khan and media expert Mile Siluma were both former CEOs of Jacaranda FM.

== Location ==
Jacaranda FM operates primarily from their studio offices in Midrand, Johannesburg Region A. The address is: Jacaranda Broadcast Centre, 89 14th Road, Erand Gardens, Midrand, PO Box 11961, Centurion 0046.

They also have a secondary studio in the Montecasino complex, Johannesburg. The regional split is broadcast from Mbombela, where another satellite studio can be found at Emnotweni Casino.

The station moved into a new building in Midrand, in December 2012, approximately 6 km south of the previous location on Samrand Avenue, Kosmosdal.

== Playout and transmission ==
Jacaranda FM utilises G-Selector music scheduling and Zetta playout software from Radio Computing Services (RCS).

The FM signal is beamed via STL from the Jacaranda Broadcast Centre in Centurion and carried on 22 transmitters broadcasting on frequencies ranging from 93.9 - 97.1 MHz. These transmitters are operated by South Africa's state-owned broadcast signal distributor Sentech.

In addition to the conventional over-the-air FM broadcast, Jacaranda FM is also available on the DStv audio bouquet (Channel 158). The DStv IS-7 K_{u} band satellite footprint blankets the whole of South Africa, Lesotho, Eswatini, Namibia, Botswana, Zimbabwe, Mozambique and the southern half of Malawi.

Live worldwide audio streaming is hosted on its website.

=== List of analogue terrestrial (FM) transmitters ===
GAUTENG

- 94.2 MHz - Pretoria-Gelukskroon
- 95.3 MHz - Menlo Park

LIMPOPO

- 93.9 MHz - Louis Trichardt
- 94.6 MHz - Potgietersrus-Sugarloaf Hill
- 95.1 MHz - Thabazimbi-Kransberg
- 95.2 MHz - Hoedspruit-Mariepskop
- 95.5 MHz - Blouberg-Addney
- 95.8 MHz - Tzaneen-Houtbosdorp-Pypkop
- 96.1 MHz - Nylstroom-Ruskloof

MPUMALANGA

- 94.0 MHz - Dullstroom-Mareskop
- 95.0 MHz - Middelburg-Elandspruit
- 95.3 MHz - Piet Retief-Goedetrouw
- 95.7 MHz - Mbombela-Spitskop
- 95.8 MHz - Volksrust
- 96.0 MHz - Lydenburg
- 96.2 MHz - Carolina-Pittville
- 96.7 MHz - Davel-Spioenkop
- 97.1 MHz - Sabie-Klein-Spitskop

NORTH WEST

- 93.9 MHz - Rustenburg-Ishufi
- 94.8 MHz - Enzelsberg-Derdepoort
- 95.5 MHz - Groot Marico
- 95.8 MHz - Zeerust-Ottoshoop

== Broadcast time ==
- 24/7

== Listenership figures ==
Estimated Listenership
	7 Day	Ave. Mon-Fri
May 2015	1 955 000	1 000 000
May 2013	1 855 000	909 000
Feb 2013	1 744 000	831 000
Dec 2012	1 796 000	835 000
Oct 2012	1 869 000	843 000
Aug 2012	1 771 000	780 000
Jun 2012	1 774 000	804 000
