= List of radio stations in Lesotho =

- Lesotho National Broadcasting Service or LNBS, is the state-controlled radio broadcaster of Lesotho.
  - Radio Lesotho 93.9-99.3FM (Broadcasts in Sesotho and English)
- BBC World Service Africa 90.2FM (Broadcasts in English around Maseru)
- Harvest FM H
- 357 FM
- Sublime Radio, 357FM 94.3FM

106.9FM (Maseru music, talk Sesotho, English)

- Lesotho Catholic 103.3FM
- MoAfrika FM
- People's Choice FM 95.6FM
- RFI Afrique (Broadcast in French and English)
- Bokamoso FM 97.4FM Maseru 98.2 Leribe 92.6 Mafeteng
- Ultimate Radio 99.8FM (Commercial Radio Station Owned by the Government/State-State Controlled. Broadcasts in Sesotho and English)
- LM Radio 104 FM(English radio station with the highest music content in Maseru and surrounding areas)
- T`senolo FM 104.6FM
- Soul Radio Internet based only

Ultimate FM 99.8 was first established on May 9, 2006, as the first state owned commercial radio in Lesotho. Its mandate is to cater for the business community and the youth and to become Ministry of Communication's cash cow. The station was established through former Radio Lesotho presenters, who were tasked to ensuring that there is a clear and proper roadmap, strategy, content and programmes.

The team was also tasked at recruiting temporary staff to start broadcasting by the end of May 2006. In 2008 Manyokole, 8 more permanent staff was hired. Ultimate FM changed to the Ultimate Radio later on as it extend its transmission to AM 891 and AM 1197. In 2013 the station briefly aired on FM 88.6 in Leribe which later stopped. From 2014 the station held the successful Annual Ultimate Radio Music Awards (UMAs). Ultimate Radio broadcasts mainly in English for 19 hours a day, it is a predominantly music service which also offers sports, advertisements and news summaries.
