= Naledi Theatre Awards =

South African national theatre award

- Awarded for: Excellence in Theatre
- Country: South Africa
- First award: 2004; 22 years ago
- Website: naleditheatreawards.com

The Naledi Theatre Awards are annual South African national theatre awards held in Gauteng launched in 2004 by Dawn Lindberg after the Vita Awards ended. Productions staged throughout the previous year are eligible, and the candidates are evaluated by the Naledi panel of judges.

== Ceremonies ==
#	Season	Date	Venue	MC(s)
1st	2003	2004	Sound Stage, Midrand	
2nd	2004	13 February 2005	Barnyard Theatre Broadacres	Yvonne Chaka Chaka and Anthony Fridjhon
3rd	2005	19 February 2006	University of Johannesburg Arts Centre	Bill Flynn and Rosie Motene
4th	2006	19 February 2007	University of Johannesburg Arts Centre	Marc Lottering and Jeannie D
5th	2007	3 March 2008	Lyric Theatre, Gold Reef City	Leanne Manas and Tumisho Masha
6th	2008	19 April 2009	South African State Theatre	Mark Banks and Sade Giliberti
7th	2009	7 March 2010	South African State Theatre	Corne and Twakkie
8th	2010	7 March 2011	Lyric Theatre, Gold Reef City	Nik Rabinowitz
9th	2012	18 March 2013	Lyric Theatre, Gold Reef City	Alan Committie
10th	2013	17 March 2014	Lyric Theatre, Gold Reef City	Lebo Mashile
11th	2014	18 March 2015	Lyric Theatre, Gold Reef City	Lebo Mashile and Chester Missing
12th	2015	19 April 2016	Lyric Theatre, Gold Reef City	Mark Banks and Bridget Masinga
13th	2016	5 June 2017	Lyric Theatre, Gold Reef City	Mark Banks
14th	2017	18 June 2018	Teatro at Montecasino	
15th	2018	20 May 2019	Joburg Theatre	
16th	2019	13 September 2020	South African State Theatre (online)	Sne Dladla

== Regular categories ==
Play:

- Performance by a Female Actor in a Lead Role
- Performance by a Male Actor in a Lead Role
- Performance by a Female Actor in a Supporting Role
- Performance by a Male Actor in a Supporting Role
- Director
- Best Play

Musical:

- Performance by a Female Actor in a Lead Role
- Performance by a Male Actor in a Lead Role
- Performance by a Female Actor in a Supporting Role
- Performance by a Male Actor in a Supporting Role
- Director
- Best Musical
- Best Musical Revue
- Musical Direction
- Musical score / arrangement

Musical or Play:

- Breakthrough Performance
- Ensemble Performance
- Performance in a Solo Production
- Independent / Fringe Theatre Production
- Best New South African Script

Youth:

- Production for Children and Young Audiences
- Performance in a Production for Children and Young Audiences
- Tertiary Student / Incubator Theatre Production

Tech and design:

- Sound Design
- Lighting (LX) Design
- Set Design
- Costume / Props
- Animation / AV Design

Dance and choreography:

- Original Choreography
- Contemporary Dance or Ballet

== Special categories ==
- Lifetime Achievement Award, for individuals with over 30 years experience in the industry
- Innovation in Theatre Award, for outstanding contribution to South African theatre
- World Impact Award, for individuals or productions that garner international recognition
- Lesedi Spirit of Courage Award, for individuals who have overcome extreme circumstances
