= Noeleen Maholwana-Sangqu =

South African radio and TV host and philanthropist

- Born: 14 September 1967 (age 59); Umtata, South Africa
- Education: University of Transkei
- Spouse: Andile Sangqu
- Children: 3
- Awards: Crystal Award for Best Talk Show Host, 2004 and 2005; Stars of Mzansi Award for Best TV Presenter 2008
- Presenting career
- Show: 3Talk
- Station: SABC3
- Station: Radio 702
- Website: https://www.noeleenmaholwanasangqu.co.za/

Noeleen Maholwana-Sangqu (born 14 September 1967) is a former South African radio and TV talk show host and philanthropist. She is best known for hosting the SABC daily talk show 3Talk.

== Biography ==
Maholwana-Sangqu was born in Umtata, South Africa in 1967 and was educated at John Bisseker High School in the Eastern Cape. She studied law at the University of Transkei in Umtata.

Maholwana-Sangqu started her presenting career on Radio Transkei in 1986, broadcasting in both English and isiXhosa. She then moved on to Radio 702 in 1994, where she was the second black woman on air at the station. She later served as a member of the Primedia Broadcasting Board.

Maholwana-Sangqu began her television career in 2003 on the South African Broadcasting Corporation (SABC)'s daily show 3Talk. The show explored topics including contemporary racism in South Africa. Maholwana-Sangqu also interviewed celebrity guests, such as Lionel Richie, Kelly Rowland, Yudhika Sujanani, Desmond Tutu and Tats Nkonzo.

In 2004, Maholwana-Sangqu also hosted Great South Africans with Denis Beckett. The show became embroiled in a national controversy over the rankings accorded to some South African political figures. For example, Hendrik Verwoerd, the "Architect of Apartheid", ranked higher on the list than Albert Luthuli, South Africa's first Nobel Peace laureate, or Chris Hani, a famous anti-apartheid activist. The show was cancelled before the top ten were announced.

In 2004 and 2005, Maholwana-Sangqu won the Crystal Award for Best Talk Show Host for 3Talk. In 2008, she was awarded the inaugural Stars of Mzansi Award for Best TV Presenter. She became known as the "Queen of Talk." Maholwana-Sangqu quit 3Talk with Noleen in 2015, after hosting the show for 12 years. Her last show aired on 20 April 2015.

Maholwana-Sangqu then became a philanthropist, motivational speaker and a director of the HIRS Women’s Development Consultancy. She also runs a soup kitchen for women in need.

== Personal life ==
Noeleen Maholwana-Sangqu is married to South African businessman Andile Sangqu. The couple has three children: their eldest son Thando Sangqu, and twin daughters Khanya and Siyanda Sangqu.

In 2025, she was hospitalised due to a health scare.
