= Darren "Whackhead" Simpson =

South African comedian (born 1977)

- Born: Darren Simpson; 19 April 1977 (age 49); Durban, South Africa
- Other name: Whackhead
- Occupations: Radio presenter; Comedian; Phone prankster
- Employer(s): Primedia Broadcasting (94.7 Highveld Stereo & K-FM)
- Known for: Radio show presenting; Radio phone pranking; Stand-up comedy
- Spouse: Samantha Teixeira (m. 2010)

Darren "Whackhead" Simpson (born 19 April 1977) is a South African comedian and radio presenter working for Primedia, a broadcasting company that owns the radio stations 947 and 94.5 Kfm (among others) in South Africa. He presented the morning show, Breakfast Xpress, on 947 in Johannesburg between April 2003 and March 2017, before moving to the Cape Town based sister station of 94.5 Kfm, to present a morning show, Kfm mornings.

== Radio career ==
As of Monday 2 August 2010, Simpson had been hosting 94.7's morning show Breakfast Xpress. The show was previously hosted by Jeremy Mansfield under the name The Rude Awakening. The Breakfast Xpress Team changed time slots with Anele Mdoda and the 947 Drive Team on 3 April 2017 and now runs under the name 947 Xpress Drive. In April 2017, Simpson started to host the 94.5 KFM Breakfast Show, hosting both shows for the remainder of 2017. In January 2018, Simpson left 947 in order to exclusively focus on the "KFM Breakfast Show".

Simpson's prank call slot titled Whackhead's Window on the World used to be broadcast on 947 in Johannesburg, during his tenure there, and continued on Kfm Breakfast in Cape Town after his transfer there in 2017. His pranks are available for podcast on a daily basis by the radio stations.

Simpson has also co-starred with Mansfield on the M-Net hidden camera show, Laugh Out Loud.

=== Tom Cruise scam ===
On 27 January 2009, Simpson scammed Australia's radio breakfast duo, Kyle and Jackie O, making them believe that they were going to interview Tom Cruise about the film Valkyrie. The Australian show had ridiculed one of Simpson's pranks in the past, and he had been working on the prank for about two months. Once on air, Simpson announced that they had been scammed and congratulated the Proteas cricket team on their victory over the Australian side on the day before. The Australian station, 2Day FM, had spent approximately AUD$150 000 on advertising the interview in the preceding days. Simpson commented that the entire prank cost him about R 60 for the phone call.

=== Discography ===
Between 2004 and 2016, Simpson has compiled a yearly CD compilation of his pranks, as heard on 947. Following is a list of all his releases, as of 2011:

- The Best of Whack Head's Prank Calls

Released: 2004
Number of discs: 1

- Oh My Greatness Hits!

Released: 2005
Number of discs: 2

- Serial Prankster

Released: 2007-11-05
Number of discs: 2
This is the first album to offer bonus tracks from its official website.

- Off the Hook

Released: 2008
Number of discs: 2

- Thrown in the Deep End

Released: 2009
Number of discs: 2

- Phowned

Released: 2010
Number of discs: 2

- Epic Fail

Released: 2011
Number of discs: 2

== Biography ==
Simpson was born on 19 April 1977, in Durban, South Africa.

On 2 February 2010, he announced his engagement to Samantha Teixeira. The wedding took place on 25 September 2010.
