= David Gresham =

South African record producer

- Born: David Gresham; 1943 (age 81–82); Mbabane, Swaziland
- Citizenship: South African
- Occupation: Record producer
- Years active: 1967–present
- Known for: David Gresham Entertainment Group
- Spouse: Ismay
- Children: 3
- Website: David Gresham Entertainment

David Gresham (born 1943 in Mbabane, Swaziland) is a South African independent record producer, publisher, promoter, and radio & television personality. He is best known for his career on SABC's Springbok Radio show, South Africa's Top 20 and on SABC TV's, Pop Shop. He owns David Gresham Entertainment Group. His career, starting in the 1960s and has spanned five decades.

== Early life ==
The son of a German father, he was born and brought up in Mbabane, Swaziland. He attended St Mark's School in Mbabane. After finishing high school, he was sent to South Africa by his father to become an electromedical engineer.

== Broadcast career ==
Not wanting a career as an x-ray technician, he instead wanted to be a sound engineer. He auditioned for LM Radio's Rod Vickers, a radio station in Mozambique, for a job as a sound engineer but failed the interview but was given an introduction to a job at Herrick Merryl Recording Studios. Gresham spent three years there learning sound engineering as the company that produced and recorded radio dramas for SABC and he produced the sound and music for radio shows.

His break back into LM Radio occurred a few years later when he met the editors of the station at a jazz concert in Swaziland. Gresham arrived at LM Radio in January 1965, six months after the station had changed its format to pop music and broadcast as a 24 hour station. His station manager and managing director there was David Davies and worked with Darryl Jooste, John Berks, and Evelyn Martin. He would broadcast with LM Radio for two and half years but really wanted to compose and record music.

Leaving LM Radio, Gresham returned to Johannesburg in 1967 and joined Teal Records as an artists and repertoire (A&R) and promotions manager at their subsidiary World Records. At the same time as working for Teal, he was offered a freelance position as a host of on the SABC's Springbok Radio's 5.30pm drive show The Record Express. The radio show would eventually move to 4.30pm and was renamed The David Gresham Show and broadcast from 4pm to 6pm.

In 1969, on a trip to London to interview music stars, he was invited to interview John Lennon. Lennon and the Beatles had been banned from SABC for five years after his 1966 comments about Christianity. In his interview with Gresham, Lennon apologised for his comments describing himself as a fan of Jesus Christ. On his return to Johannesburg, Gresham could not get the interview played on SABC Radio as the censors were now offended by Lennon's comments about being a fan, the censors believed one could only be a follower.

In 1971, Gresham was asked to host Springbok Radio's Top 20 on Friday nights, rebroadcast on Saturday afternoon as SA Hits Of The Week at 5.00pm. The Friday show was later called the South African Top 20 and he hosted the show until 1985 when the station Springbok Radio was closed down. After the end of Springbok Radio, he continued presenting on radio until 1991.

When television arrived in South Africa in 1975, Gresham presented a variety show, Sunshine 30, on the SABC test channel. When television officially started in 1976, he presented the early evening music show on Friday's called Pop Shop and would host it for two years. Gresham courted controversy in the conservative parts of white South Africa when on Pop Shop, he played a music video featuring an American black singer for the first time on television. Later he would host the SABC TV show Easy Beat for two years.

== Music career ==
Gresham left Teal Records after they wouldn't produce a song he had written. Instead went to EMI and produced two songs with two artists and Clive Calder A&R Manager at EMI would release them. At the same time Gresham met Mutt Lange through Calder. The song he wrote and produced, costing him $1.50 per hour in the studio to record, was I’ll Walk With You by the singer Irishman Sean Rennie and the song went on to reach the Top 10 chart in South Africa.

In 1972, Gresham and his partner Allan Goldswain formed a record label called Nitty Gritty Records. The company obtained its current name in 1984 when it was changed to David Gresham Records. In its early days the company would write jingles for advertisements which gave the label extra money while Gresham's SABC salary paid the company's bills.

== Honours ==
Gresham was awarded a gold medal in 2016 from Midem in honour of role in the music industry.

== Marriage ==
He is married to Ismay, an ex-dancer and had three children, Larry, Leigh and Angela.
