= Broadcasting Complaints Commission =

Broadcasting Complaints Commission may refer to:

- A predecessor of the Broadcasting Authority of Ireland
- Broadcasting Complaints Commission (UK)
- Broadcasting Complaints Commission of South Africa
