= Masinga =

Masinga may refer to:

- Bennett Masinga (1965–2013), South African footballer
- Bridget Masinga (born 1981), South African actress, television and radio personality, fashion model and philanthropist
- Phil Masinga (1969–2019), South African professional footballer and manager
- Masinga Constituency, an electoral constituency in Kenya
- Masinga Hydroelectric Power Station, Tana River, Kenya

== See also ==
- Massinga District, a district of Inhambane Province, Mozambique
- 760 Massinga, a minor planet
