= 5FM =

South African radio station

Coordinates: 26.1859°S 28.0094°E

- South Africa
- Frequencies: Various Nationwide, 98.0 FM in Johannesburg & DAB+ Trial in Cape Town Johannesburg and Pretoria

Programming
- Format: CHR (Contemporary hit radio)

Ownership
- Owner: SABC

History
- First air date: 13 October 1975
- Former names: Radio 5 (1975–1992)

Links
- Webcast: Listen live
- Website: www.5fm.co.za

5FM is a South African FM radio station forming part of the South African Broadcasting Corporation (SABC), South Africa's public broadcaster. 5FM follows a Top 40 music format aimed at a youth market, together with news and sports coverage.

Originally named Radio 5, the station was re-branded as "5FM" in 1992, and has as its current logo a red "5" and superscripted "FM" within a circle and the words "The Power of" inscribed along the upper periphery of the circle.

The station is currently managed by Masixole Mdingane, Business Unit Manager of the PCS Combo (Good Hope FM & 5FM).

== Origin and history ==
Formerly known as "Radio 5", the station developed from a commercial station, LM Radio, which had been broadcasting to a South African youth audience from Lourenço Marques (now Maputo) in neighbouring Mozambique. When LM Radio was shut down by the incoming Frelimo government after Mozambique gained its independence, the South African government instructed the SABC to take over the staff and the service. The station was renamed Radio 5, and former LM Radio presenter Nick Megans presented the first live show starting at 05:00 on 13 October 1975 from SABC Broadcast House in Commissioner Street. Radio 5 broadcast in the medium wave band from transmitters at Welgedacht, Maraisburg, Pietersburg, Durban, Bloemfontein, Brackenfell, Port Elizabeth and Grahamstown. Broadcasting was later moved to the basement of the Broadcast Centre, Auckland Park in Johannesburg.

The name Radio 5 indicated that it was the SABC's fifth national radio channel at that time, after Radio Suid-Afrika, Radio South Africa, Springbok Radio and Radio Bantu.

Initially the government-controlled SABC required Radio 5 to be bilingual with an equal weighting of English and Afrikaans. Music content was strictly controlled and censored. Radio 5 competed with the independent Channel 702 (later renamed to Radio 702) broadcasting from Bophuthatswana and Capital 604 from the Transkei. Radio 702 changed its music format to a Top 40 format, on the advice of an American consultant, Bob Hennaberry, and head hunted the former Radio LM presenter John Berks from Radio 5. Within a year 702 claimed nearly a million listeners from the PWV area (now Gauteng) while the nationwide Radio 5 had less than 150,000.

Malcolm Russell, a former Rhodesian TV and radio host, who hosted host the new Radio 5 Breakfast Show, was appointed Programme Director and initiated a mandate to improve the station, with the support of Riaan Eksteen who became Director General of the SABC in 1984. English became the primary broadcast language and commercial scheduling was overhauled to be less intrusive. Presenters were re-engaged on an annual freelance contract with shows named for and designed by them.

New evening shows were launched to compete with television one of them being Chris Prior - the "Rock Professor". FM stereo was introduced nationally, and broadcasts extended to 24/7. The Chuckle and Chat, a live phone-in show interspersed with music, was introduced as the first talk show on a South African music station, presented by David Blood and Tony Sanderson. It became the most popular programme with listenership peaking at around 1 million nightly.

Russell made the presenters responsible for their own success or failure with the promise that, when their year's contract expired, they would be free to renegotiate based on the audience the shows delivered. However, Russell remained on salary and sought to negotiate the same performance-based contract for himself. Senior management rejected the proposal and Russell resigned to begin his own company, the Broadcast Development Group, and was later contracted to assist Radio 702 with its repositioning and transition to 702 Talk Radio.

== Current On-Air Lineup ==
Line Up Correct As Of 1 April 2025.
Weekdays
4 am - 6 am	5 Early Mornings	Tshepi ‘The Big Chief’ Moji
6 am - 9 am	5 Breakfast	Nick Hamman with Thabo Baloyi (News), Xoli Zondo (Sport) and Marli van Eeden (Traffic)
9 am - 12 pm	5 Mid Mornings	Steph B with Yonaka Theledi (News)
12 pm - 3 pm	5 Lunch	Lula Odiba with Nadia Romanos (News)
3 pm - 6 pm	5 Drive	Zanele Potelwa & Nick Archibald with Yanga Mjoli (News) and Jude van Wyk (Sport)
6 pm - 7 pm (Mon - Thurs)	The Kyle Cassim Show on 5	Kyle Cassim
6 pm - 10 pm (Friday)	The Roger Goode Show on 5	Roger Goode
7 pm - 10 pm (Mon - Thurs)	5 Nights	Karabo Ntshweng
10 pm - 1 am (Mon - Thurs)	5 After Hours	Leah Jazz
10 pm - 1 am (Friday)	In Das we Trust on 5	Das Kapital
Saturday
4 am - 7 am	5 Weekend Early Mornings	Tom Hele & Mtha Agbiriogu
7 am - 10 am	5 Weekend Breakfast	Mike V with Palesa Lemeke (News) & Aaron Masemola (Sport)
10 am - 2 pm	Top 40 on 5	Harrison Mkhize
2 pm - 5 pm	Smash Afrika Weekends	Smash Afrika with Karabo Hobo (News), Kaybee Modishane (Sport)
5 pm - 7 pm	The CINIMIN Show	Kyle Cassim & Austin Cassim
7 pm-10 pm	Piano Plug on 5	DJ Tshepi
10 pm - 1 am	5 Weekend Nights	Boipelo Mooketsi
Sunday
4am - 7am	5 Weekend Early Mornings	Tom Hele & Mtha Agbiriogu
7am - 10am	5 Weekend Breakfast	Mike V with Palesa Lemeke (News) & Aaron Masemola (Sport)
10am - 2pm	5 Takeover	Jodell Tantij
2 pm - 5 pm	Smash Afrika Weekends	Smash Afrika with Karabo Hobo (News), Kaybee Modishane (Sport)
5 pm - 7 pm	The Sunday Sizzle	Austin Cassim
7 pm - 10 pm	5 Hip Hop Nights	DJ Speedsta
10 pm - 1 am	5 Weekend Nights	Boipelo Mooketsi

=== Former Presenters ===
- Mark Gillman
- Alex Jay
- Kevin Savage
- Brian Oxley
- Martin Bailey
- Rafe Lavine
- Tony Blewitt
- Tich Mataz
- Ian F (Also Hosted the 5fm Top 40 with Sasha Martinengo)
- Darren Scott (Drive time with John Walland, Ray White and Leigh-Ann Mol (née Van der Stadt))
- Mark Pilgrim with Ray White (Weekend Breakfast Show)
- Rob Vega
- Tony Murrell
- Cleone Cassidy
- Ursula Stapelfeldt (Host of the World Chart Show)
- Sami Sabiti (Host of the World Chart Show)
- Koula (Host of the World Chart Show)
- Nicole Fox
- Sasha Martinengo
- Zuraida Jardine
- Gareth Cliff
- Derek the Bandit
- Keith Lindsay
- Barney Simon
- Phil Wright
- Christina Knight (Knight School The Really Early Morning Show on Weekends)
- Thando Thabethe
- Ms Cosmo
- DJ Fresh
- Minnie Ntuli

== 5FM On-Air Shows ==
=== Breakfast Shows ===
The Mark Gillman show was hosted by Mark Gillman and supported by Kevin Fine and Reuben Goldberg, Catherine Strydom (Grenfell) and stuntman "DangerBoy". Gillman was known for his loud personality and his slogan "I Love it in the Mornings".

After a brief stint as the host of the drive-time show, Gareth Cliff replaced Gillman as 5fm's Breakfast Show host. With Cliff as the host, the show was supported by Leigh-Ann Mol on News, Mabale Moloi on traffic & Sias DuPlessis on Sport, with the production team featuring Damon Kalvari (Assistant to the Producer), and Thabo Modisane (Executive Producer). The show ended in 2014 when Cliff began an online radio platform, to which all of his team, save DuPlessis & Modisane, followed him.

Following Cliff's departure in 2014, DJ Fresh took over the morning show, having hosted the drive-time show since 2003. He was joined by Carmen Reddy on News, Duran Collett on Sports News, Sol Phenduka (and later Nonala Tose) on Traffic. On 31 March 2017, Fresh left 5FM for sister station, Metro FM.

He was replaced by Roger Goode, who hosted the show alongside Robbie Kruse on Sports, Sureshnie Rieder on News and Zanele Potelwa (nicknamed 'Young Boomerang') on traffic.

Dan Corder assumed the role of host on the Breakfast Show in April 2021, accompanied by Thabo Baloyi delivering the latest news updates, Xoli Zondo covering sports, and Marli van Eeden providing traffic reports. However, in April 2024, just a month after signing his contract for the 2024/2025 lineup, Corder announced his departure from the show.

In July 2024, former Drive Presenter Nick Hamman took over the reins of the Breakfast Show, retaining his predecessor's team.

=== Weekday Mid-Morning Shows ===
5FM weekday mid-morning presenters include Rob Vember, Poppy Ntshongwana and prior to their Drive Shows, Thando Thabethe, Nick Hamman & Zanele Potelwa.

In May 2020, Msizi James and Stephanie Be paired up to present the Mid Mornings on 5 show during the brunchtime slot. Since then, the show has seen James’ departure for Johannesburg-based rival station 947 and Stephanie currently hosts the show alongside Yonaka Theledi on news.

Rob Forbes and Fix Moeti hosted the Forbes&Fix show during the lunchtime slot, with Kim Schulze on news. In 2021, they left the station, and the lunchtime show was taken over by Zanele Potelwa, until July 2024, when former YFM jock Lula Odiba made the move to 5FM, presenting the show with Nadia Romanos on news.

=== Drive Time Shows ===
Until 2014, DJ Fresh hosted "The Fresh Drive" alongside Catherine Grenfell, Poppy Ntshongwana, Duran Collett & Carmen Reddy. They were replaced by Roger Goode, Ms Cosmo, Sureshnie Rieder and Sias du Plessis, who was later replaced by Robbie Kruse.

In 2017, Thando Thabethe became the station's first woman to host the Drive Time show. "The Thabooty Drive" featured Durbanite Msizi James as the co-host, Sibaphiwe Matiyela (and later, Nadia Romanos) on News and Duran Collett on Sports.

In May 2020, Nick Hamman, who had previously hosted the Hamman Time show during the mid-morning slot, took over as the host of 5Drive with producer Mad Money Mike, Nadia Romanos on news, Yonaka Theledi on traffic and Jude van Wyk on sports.

In July 2024, a new Drivetime show was launched, with former Lunch show presenter Zanele Potelwa as the host, and former Top 40 on 5 presenter Nick Archibald as co-host and traffic presenter. They were joined by Yanga Mjoli on news and Jude van Wyk, who had been on the prior iteration of the station's drivetime show, on sporting duties.

=== Weekday Evening & Night Programming ===
Evening Programming commences with Kyle Cassim, who presents an hour-long mix show on Mondays to Thursdays, and Roger Goode, who hosts a four-hour specialist dance show on Friday evenings. The evening show, 5Nights is hosted by Karabo Ntshweng from 19:00 - 22:00 Monday to Thursday. The presenters play genre-specific chart music (indie, pop, hip hop, etc.) each day.

The late-night show which airs Monday to Thursdays, 5 After Hours is hosted by Leah Jazz, while Friday’s late night offering, a dance music show titled In Das We Trust, is presented by Das Kapital.

=== Early Morning Programming ===
Until 2021, 5FM had round-the-clock broadcasting. The station is now automated with music between 01:00 and 04:00 daily. 5FM’s early morning programming comes in the form of 5 Early Mornings, hosted by Tshepang ‘The Big Chief’ Moji between Monday and Friday between 04:00 and 06:00, and their weekend counterpart, 5 Weekend Early Mornings hosted by UCT Radio alumni Thomas Hele & Mtha Agbiriogu on Saturdays and Sundays between 04:00 and 07:00.

=== Weekend Breakfast Shows ===
Before 2019, the Weekend Breakfast show, A Cuppa JT was hosted by Justin Toerien, with Nadia Romanos & Jude van Wyk on News & Sports respectively.

In April 2019, Nicole da Silva took over the reins of the weekend morning slot, naming the show 5FM Xtra Loud Mornings. She is joined by Sibaphiwe Matiyela on News and Duran Collett on Sports.

As of May 2022 KwaZulu-Natal born Minnie Ntuli from East Coast Radio joined the national youth radio station to anchor 5 Weekend Breakfast with Monique De Villiers on News and Aaron Masemola on Sports. A 2023-line up change saw Retshepile Seakamela take over the reins of the show, retaining Aaron Masemola on the sports desk and introducing Palesa Lemeke as a Newsreader. Mike V took over the Weekend Breakfast Show in April 2025.

=== Weekend Shows ===
Weekend music shows are hosted by a collective of specialist music show hosts including Roger Goode, DJ Speedsta, Das Kapital, DJ Tshepi, as well as dance DJ outfit CINIMIN, made up of brothers Kyle & Austin Cassim.

Harrison Mkhize anchors the Top 40 on 5 chart show on Saturday afternoons, with TuksFM alumna Jodell Tantij hosting the 5 Takeover request show on Sundays.

The weekend afternoon slot, Smash Afrika Weekends is anchored by Smash Afrika, who hosts the show alongside newsreader Karabo Hobo & sportsreader Kaybee Modishane, while the evening offering, 5 Weekend Nights, is hosted by Boipelo Mooketsi.

== Listenership figures ==
Estimated Listenership
	7 Day
Nov 2015	1 745 000
Sep 2015	1 706 000
Jun 2015	1 724 000
Feb 2015	1 707 000
Dec 2014	1 749 000
Oct 2014	1 904 000
Aug 2014	1 962 000
Jun 2014	1 878 000
May 2014	1 925 000
Feb 2014	2 021 000
Dec 2013	2 131 000
Nov 2013	2 064 000
Aug 2013	2 068 000
Jun 2013	2 127 000
May 2013	2 089 000
Feb 2013	2 025 000
Dec 2012	2 146 000
Oct 2012	2 176 000
Aug 2012	2 189 000
Jun 2012	2 246 000
