= Stan Katz (broadcaster) =

South African broadcaster (born 1949)

- Born: Stanley Bernard Katz; 25 March 1949 (age 77); Mafikeng, South Africa
- Education: University of the Witwatersrand
- Occupations: Broadcaster, consultant, author
- Spouse(s): Dixi Katz (divorced); Philippa Sklaar (1999-2001)
- Partner(s): Jani Allan; Kate Normington

Stan Katz (born 25 March 1949) is a South African broadcaster, best known as the presenter of Radio 702's highly rated Morning Zoo show. Katz would later become the CEO of Primedia Broadcasting.

== Background ==
Katz completed a B.Com. at the University of the Witwatersrand and began his broadcasting career at Swazi Music Radio where he was a radio presenter and programme director. In 1976 he began his own communications company and began staging music festivals in South Africa. He wrote and produced 'A Tribute to Jimi Hendrix' at the Market Theatre (Johannesburg).

He returned to radio presenting in 1982 with an afternoon slot on Radio 702 presenting “The Stan Katz Goodtime Lowdown Rock and Roll Radio Show”. Three years later he became the station's Sales and marketing director. By 1987 he was both the managing director of the station and popular host of the highly rated Morning Zoo.

In 1994 he became CEO of Primedia Broadcasting and oversaw the establishment of Cape Town's premier radio station, Cape Talk. Several years later, he co-founded MobiBlitz, a mobile media company specializing in the deployment of Bluetooth systems in shopping malls.

Katz was inducted into the MTN Radio Awards Hall of Fame in 2012 and continues to work as a radio consultant, lending his expertise and experience to both domestic and international radio stations.

He has also authored a book on radio advertising and marketing entitled: “Radio Advertising. A Sound Investment. 10 Key Principles for Maximising Returns”.

== Personal life ==
Katz' grandparents came to South Africa from England and Lithuania. His first marriage was to Dixi Katz, with whom he has one daughter. Their marriage ended at the height of his success at 702. He married Philippa Sklaar in 1999 and the pair divorced two years later. Katz has a second child from another relationship. He was later in a long-term relationship with the actress, Kate Normington.

His best-known relationship was with the Sunday Times columnist, Jani Allan in the 1980s. At this time, both were tabloid favourites and Katz was voted “South Africa's Sexiest Man of the Year” by a glamour magazine. South African tabloids christened Katz and Allan as “South Africa's Best Looking Couple”. Allan regularly appeared on the Zoo Show and wrote about it in her newspaper column. Allan details her relationship with Katz in her 2015 memoir, Jani Confidential. Allan, a long-time friend of Katz, died of cancer in 2023.
