= Alan Committie =

South African Comedian, actor and director (1974)

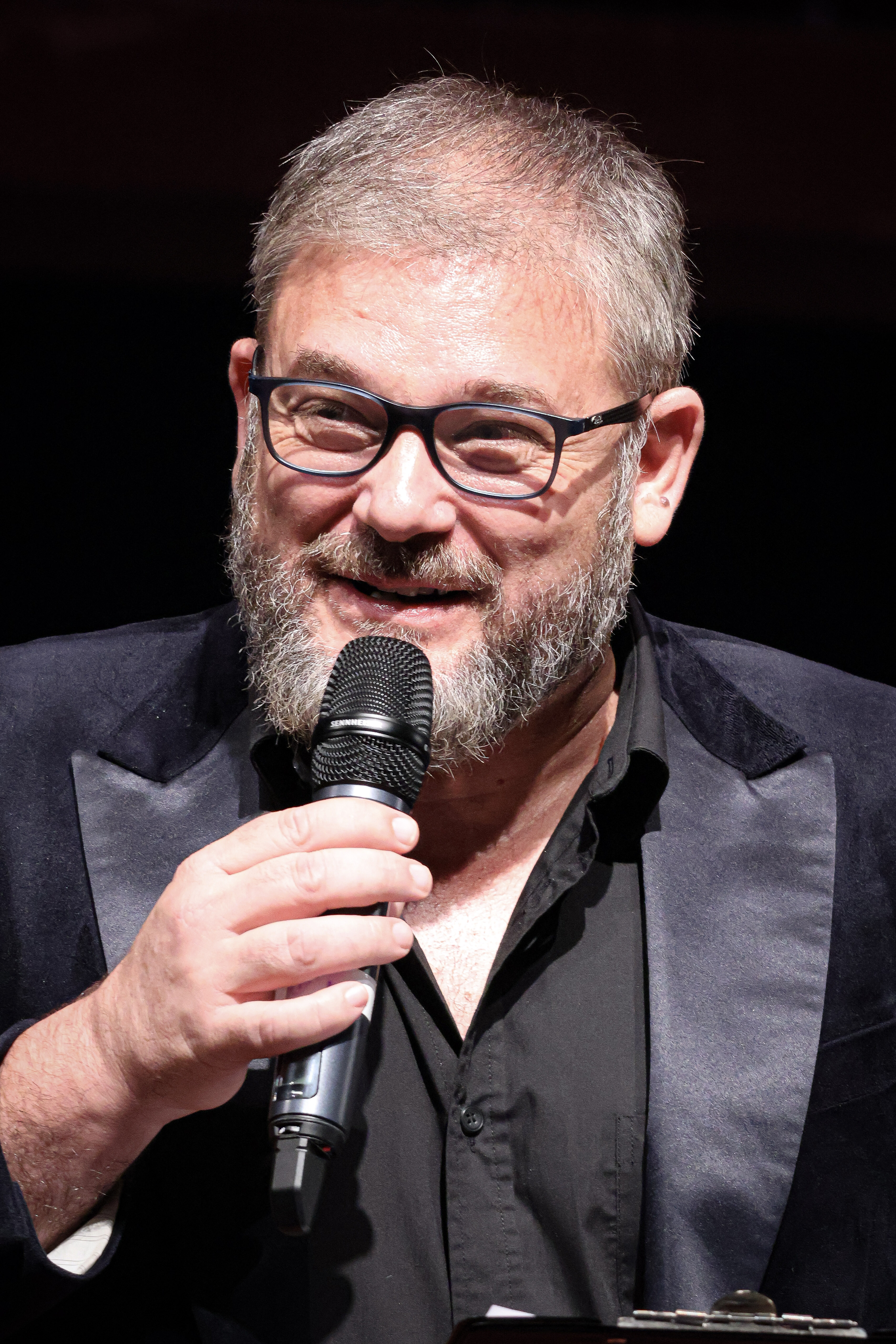
- Committie in 2026
- Born: 6 January 1974 (age 52); Cape Town, South Africa
- Occupations: Comedian; Actor; Entertainer; Director
- Years active: 1997 - present
- Website: www.alancommittie.co.za

Alan Committie (born 6 January 1974) is a South African comedian, actor, theatre director and qualified high school teacher.

Committie has performed on stage, television, radio and the Internet. In addition to his own self-written shows, Committie has performed a number of other stage productions including Rob Becker's Defending the Caveman. He is particularly well known for his character 'Johan van der Walt', a highly officious, disturbingly pedantic, offensive security officer and part-time film critic.

== Performance career ==
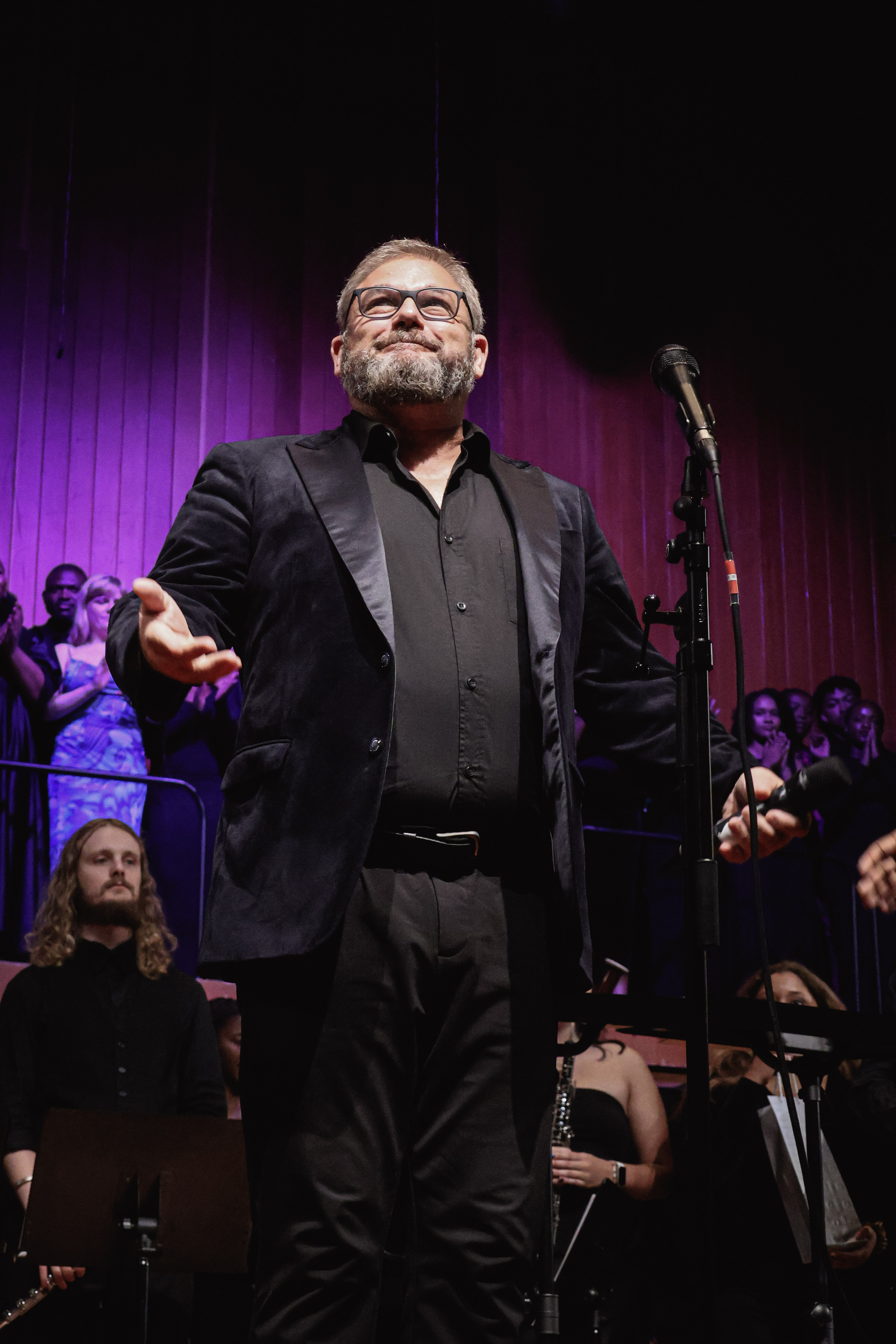
Alan Committie with SACM in 2026

=== Committie's own stage plays ===
- Stressed for Success
- Stressed to Kill
- One Man One Remote
- TV or not TV
- Titanic on Ice
- Once upon a Laugh (with Robyn Scott)
- Dracula - Unclotted (with Geatan Schmid)
- Dick and Di
- The Clown Jewels Part 2
- The Clown Jewels Part 1

=== Appearing in ===
- Rob Becker's Defending the Caveman
- Tom Stoppard's Rosencrantz and Guildenstern Are Dead
- Michael Frayn's Noises Off

=== Other appearances ===
- Fleur du Cap Awards as Master of Ceremonies, Baxter Theatre, Cape Town (2008)
- Stand Up South Africa Comedy Festival in London, UK (2002)
- Smirnoff International Comedy Festival (1997–2003)

=== Television ===
- Appearing as Johan van der Walt in M-Net's Laugh out Loud
- Starring as Johan van der Walt in M-Net's Van der Walt's Fault
- Cameo appearances in many SA sitcoms including Marc Lottering and Friends
- Appearing in various TV adverts including FAMSA, Polo Classic, OK Bazaars, Castle Lager and Cadbury's
- Character voice-over for SABC's animation series URBO.
- As Cornel van Wyk in Recipes for Love and Murder

=== Radio ===
- Character voices for various radio spots
- "Unofficial" film reviewer as Johan van der Walt for Nic Marais' breakfast show on KFM

=== Internet ===
- Performed and co-wrote a number of viral ads for Rugby 365

== Awards ==
- Naledi Theatre Awards 'Best Comedy Performance (Male)' for Stressed To Kill (Johannesburg, 2008)
- Fleur du Cap Awards 'Best Performance by an actor' in Rosencrantz and Guildenstern Are Dead (Cape Town, 2008)
- S.A. Film & Television Awards 'Golden Horn for Best Supporting Actor in a TV Comedy' for Committie's role of Johan van der Walt (Johannesburg, 2007)

== Education ==
- Higher Diploma in Education, University of Cape Town
- Performer's Diploma, University of Cape Town
- Bachelor of Arts, University of Cape Town (1996)
