= Stan Katz =

Stan Katz may refer to:

- Stan Katz (psychologist)
- Stan Katz (broadcaster)

== See also ==
- Stanley Nider Katz (born 1934), American historian
