= Bridget Masinga =

South African Actress and Radio Personality

- Born: 26 February 1981 (age 45); Durban, Kwazulu-Natal (South Africa)
- Education: Ridge Park College; Boston Media House; University of South Africa
- Occupations: Fashion Model, Actress, Television and Radio Personality
- Years active: 1997–present
- Parent(s): Elvis Jabulani Masinga and Patricia Zodwa Roberson

Bridget Masinga (born 26 February 1981) is a South African actress, television and radio personality, fashion model and philanthropist. She placed 3rd in the 2002 Miss South Africa pageant and is known for her roles on the South African television shows Generations and Bay of Plenty, as well as for her work on radio. She hosts the Workzone 1 with Bridget Masinga on Jacaranda FM (formerly Jacaranda 94.2).

== Early life ==
Bridget Masinga was born and raised in Durban, South Africa – to Elvis Jabulani Masinga and Patricia Zodwa Roberson, who divorced relatively early in her childhood. She is one of the first people to attend Addington Primary after they opened their doors to non-white. She attended Ridge Park College – the school from which she would later matriculate. She mentions, regarding her time in school, "I was a prefect in Grade 12 and part of the drama club, though I used to dodge sports all the time."

Upon completion of her matric year, Masinga studied Media Studies at Boston Media House, until she had to stop studying due to financial distress.

== Career ==
=== Modeling ===
In the year 1997, at the age of 16, Masinga signed with Fork Models. She has appeared in Durban Fashion Week and campaigns for MTN Africa, Edgars South Africa and Levi's Jeans.

In 2002 Masinga competed in the Miss South Africa pageant and placed 3rd. She cites her participation in the pageant as the start of her career as well as what would go on to be a long-standing relationship with M-Net.

=== Television (Post Miss South Africa Pageant) ===
2003 - 2005

Upon completion of the Miss South Africa reality show, Masinga relocated to Johannesburg, where she continued to work with M-Net. Although she unsuccessfully auditioned to present the first season of Idols South Africa; the producer of the televised vocal contest (Gavin Wratten, who also happened to have directed the Miss South Africa pageant) told Masinga about a future project by the name of Go! - a youth-focused television channel that was set to be broadcast on DStv. Masinga stayed with the channel from 2003 up until 2006. While at Go! she hosted two music formatted shows: Beatlab (2003-2005) and Selekta (2004-2005).

2006

After appearing on Go! for a number of years, in 2006 Masinga landed the role of Zoe on the iconic South African television series Generations (which aired weekday nights on SABC 1).

In the same year she co-presented Temptation SA, alongside James Lennox (a game show which aired on M-Net and was directed, again, by Gavin Wratten). She also made a cameo appearance on e.tv’s Backstage - another hit South African television series.

2007 – 2008

In 2007, Masinga signed on to star as Theresa Nyawose on the television series, Bay of Plenty - which aired on SABC 1 in 2008. The series ran for one season and went on to do well for the channel; with the show being awarded Ensemble Cast at the 2008 South African Film and Television Awards (SAFTAS).

2009 - 2012

After appearing on Bay of Plenty - in 2009, Masinga began hosting The M-Net Movie Show (directed by Elana Afrika – Bredenkamp, it aired as a weekly special on the M-Net Movies Channel). In the same year Masinga, simultaneously joined both the SuperSport team as well as M-Net’s All Access; continuing to work with both channels well into 2012.

Between the years 2011 and 2012 – Masinga hosted the 1st and 2nd season of The Road to Miss SA (a reality television series that was aired on Mzansi Magic.)

2013

Masinga landed a featured role in the first season of Mzansi Magic’s Rockville (in 2013) - where she played a young prostitute. In the same year, she also made a cameo appearance in Isibaya (another series which aired on Mzansi Magic) as an attorney, Ms. Masinga.

2015

In 2015 – Masinga competed (as one of the ten celebrity contestants) on the eighth season, of (the popular South African version of the televised Ballroom dance competition) Strictly Come Dancing - which aired Friday nights on SABC 3.

=== Radio ===
2005 – 2010

In the year 2005 (at the age of 24) Masinga joined YFM, hosting The Elevator – a graveyard slot that was broadcast on weekday mornings before the breakfast show. In 2007, she began presenting Bridget on Y – which was broadcast on weekends from 12PM – 3PM.

She describes her weekend slot, "Bridget on Y was a music driven, magazine formatted, lifestyle show; where Saturdays were dedicated to entertainment and Sundays were about aspirational content."

Regarding the show, Masinga cites the feature Young, Black and Fabulous (during which she would introduce listeners to young dynamic black South Africans) as a favourite. In 2010, she made the decision to leave YFM – explaining that the desire to focus on furthering her studies, and developing a production company, led to the decision.

2011

Masinga returned to radio in 2011, presenting revolving slots (weekend mornings from 4AM – 7AM and Sunday evenings from 9PM – 12PM) on 947 (formerly 94.7 Highveld Stereo).

2015

From August 2015 - August 2016, Masinga hosted the Workzone 1 with Bridget Masinga on Jacaranda FM (formerly Jacaranda 94.2).

== Production company and further education ==
After the shooting for Rockville and Isibaya was completed, Masinga made the decision to take a hiatus from all work obligations, in order to dedicate her time towards the development of her production house – Bridget Productions. The company is aimed at producing documentary content that focuses on telling African stories (work that is written, produced and directed by African talents) and since its registration in 2012, has worked with the likes of Mandla Mandela.

Masinga is also pursuing a Bachelor of Arts; Government, Admin and Development from the University of South Africa (UNISA).

== Other notable work ==
Masinga appeared in the 2006 inaugural Marie Claire: The Naked Issue – targeted at raising awareness about the HIV/AIDS pandemic in South Africa. Thereafter in 2009, she was named the celebrity face of Organic Root Stimulator (for which she remain the ambassador until 2012). In 2011 she was also announced as the ambassador for Vaseline B3 lotion (2011 - 2012).

Aside from her work on television and radio, Masinga is also a Master of Ceremonies; having hosted the week-long Democratic Celebrations of the South African Embassy, which took place in Beijing (2007), the Calvin Klein SA Launch and the Design Indaba (2010), the Africa Fashion International (AFI) Awards and the Hisense Africa Launch (2011), the Grand Design Expo and the South African Film and Television Awards (SAFTAS) (2012). She has also worked with Sasol, Total and AngloGold Ashanti.

== Philanthropy ==
Masinga has worked with non–profit organisations such as the Nelson Mandela Children's Fund, Joburg Child Welfare and the Reach for a Dream Foundation. In 2012, she founded the Jane’s Daughters Foundation, a non-profit organisation aimed at enhancing the lives of female children through mentorship programmes, as well as financial and other lifestyle aids. The organisation is mainly focused on child-headed and single parent households, participating in collaborations with the Durban Children’s Home and Joburg Child Welfare.
