= LM Radio =

Radio station in Maputo, Mozambique

- Type: terrestrial radio station
- Branding: LM Radio
- Country: Mozambique
- Availability: Mozambique,(terrestrial); Lesotho, (terrestrial); Gauteng, (terrestrial) 702 KHz MW; Southern Africa by satellite
- Launch date: 1936 and resurrected 2010

LM Radio is a radio station based in Maputo, Mozambique. Historically it was a shortwave station broadcasting to South Africa and Rhodesia from Lourenço Marques (as Mozambique's capital city was called before it was renamed Maputo in 1976), hence the name "Lourenço Marques Radio" from 1936 to 1975 when it was shut down by the government of the then newly independent country. In 2010, following political reforms and economic development in Mozambique a new station was launched with the brand "Lifetime Music Radio", trading on the nostalgia of the original LM Radio.

== History 1933 to 1975 ==
The first radio station in Mozambique began broadcasting on shortwave and AM on 18 March 1933, but suspended transmissions for a while in 1934 owing to a shortage of money. A South African, G. J. McHarry became involved, and in 1935 Rádio Clube de Moçambique was launched, broadcasting mostly in English. In 1947, Colonel Richard L. Meyer, who prior to World War II was General Manager of the International Broadcasting Company of London, together with John Davenport formed Davenport and Meyer and took over the management of Lourenço Marques Radio. The station recruited David Davies to run the station and he, together with another announcer, David Gordon, were the first two announcers on the new commercial station. David Gordon left in 1950 to join the staff of Springbok Radio. In 1948 LM Radio moved into a new purpose built 4-storey building which became known as the "Radio Palace". The station started producing variety shows in front of live audiences. "Anything Goes" hosted by Peter Merrill and recorded in 1948 at the 20th Century Theatre in Johannesburg was one of the first South African radio variety shows. In the late 1950s the station underwent a major format change to cater for the younger generation who were not being catered for in South Africa by the state owned SABC. LM Radio was renowned for its Top Twenty chart show, the LM Hit Parade, and played a major role in promoting South African artists and their music. LM Radio lost much of its sparkle when it was taken over by the SABC in 1972. On 7 September 1974 the station was occupied during a bloody uprising in Lourenço Marques and the administration of the station was taken over by the Frelimo army. On 12 October 1975, following Moçambican independence from Portugal in June of that year, LM Radio facilities were nationalised and the station closed down on 13 October 1975. It was replaced in South Africa by Radio 5, later known as 5FM.

"And now, wherever you are, in the Transvaal, Natal, Orange Free State, the Cape, Southwest Africa or Rhodesia [...] greetings. And to you, to you, and especially to you, vaya con Dios", so went David Davies' farewell message at the end of a broadcast (a Portuguese version was done by Manuela Arraiano).

=== Influence ===
Until the early 1980s, broadcasting in South Africa was state controlled - the sole broadcaster being the SABC (South African Broadcasting Corporation). LM Radio was privately owned and operated, and served the vast audience of young people by transmitting pop and rock music which had limited exposure on the SABC stations. Many young South African artists made their debut on LM Radio through the numerous road shows which toured the country. LM Radio also trained a whole generation of announcers and disc jockeys who later went on to make their careers on other stations in South Africa and all over the world. Names like John Berks, Gary Edwards, Fritz Greyling, Frank Sanders, Robin Alexander, Darryl Jooste (DJ the DJ), George Wayne and David Gresham all started out at LM Radio before moving to other stations such as Swazi Music Radio (SMR), Radio 702, Springbok Radio and other SABC stations, 2JJ (now known as Triple J in Sydney) and Capital 604.

Other names who became famous through LM Radio included Gerry Wilmot (Big Daddy), Clark McKay, Evelyn Martin (Duarte Lacueva), Daryl Jooste, Reg de Beer and Lorna Harris.

== Relaunch in 2010 ==
After an absence of more than 34 years, a new LM Radio, opened in Maputo. On Christmas Eve 2009, a voice that had last been heard on the airwaves three decades earlier returned with an emotion-filled announcement. "This is LM Radio, Mozambique’s English-language music station", it said. "We are back after a break of 34 years. I’m Peter de Nobrega. I made the closing announcement on LM Radio on 12 October 1975 and it gives me great pleasure to make the opening announcement on this historic day in 2009". The broadcast licence was granted on 20 September 2010. It is Mozambique's only English-language broadcaster. The station's official name is "Lifetime Music Radio" and the slogan is "Happy Listening". LM Radio broadcasts on 87.8 FM in Maputo and surrounding areas including Matola, on 87.8 FM in Ponta do Ouro, and on 702 kHz MW in Gauteng South Africa and on satellite in Southern Africa and webstreaming.

== Licence to broadcast in Gauteng, South Africa ==
In early 2014 LM Radio was granted a licence to broadcast in Gauteng on 702 kHz on AM. This date has changed to the first 6 months of 2015 due to the company Sentech not being able to deliver the transmitters and towers on time and due to the shareholders of LM Radio not being able to get the necessary finances to pay for the transmitters and launch the station in SA. Test transmissions on 702 kHz from the Welgedacht transmitter site commenced during the first week of April 2017.
