= John Berks =

South African radio presenter (1941–2022)

- Born: John Berkowitz; 24 August 1941; Krugersdorp, South Africa
- Died: 4 June 2022 (aged 80); Johannesburg, South Africa
- Other names: Long John Berks, Berksie
- Occupation: Radio Broadcaster
- Years active: 1964–2001
- Known for: Talk 702
- Partner: Manda Wessels
- Children: Lance, Sherise

John Berks (born John Berkowitz; 24 August 1941 – 4 June 2022) was a well-known South African radio presenter. Known for his role as a breakfast presenter on Radio 702 in Johannesburg. His broadcast career covered many countries in Southern Africa and stretched from 1964 until 2001.

== Early life ==
Berks was born in Krugersdorp to Jewish parents Louis Berkowitz and Hennie Nochimowitz. He grew up in Klerksdorp, the youngest of three siblings. His father died when he was fourteen. He dropped out of Milner High School before finishing standard eight. He found work at Dandy Polish and on the production line of a soap factory in Rosettenville owned by a family member. He worked as a delivery boy for the Klerksdorp Rekord and then at the Germiston Advocate as a sports journalist. He then completed his national service in the SADF.

== Broadcast career ==
As a child, Berks had a strong interest in radio, imitating his favourite stars and sports presenters. As an adult he took elocution lessons with Colin du Plessis, an SABC English language service broadcaster, to remove his Afrikaans accent and make himself more sellable in broadcasting. He would audition for LM Radio, first with Rob Vickers and then with Gerry Wilmot before being offered a position in 1964 with the broadcaster. He would become a programme manager for them in 1969 in Johannesburg before leaving them in 1970. While at LM Radio, he was sent by David Davies to Australia to study techniques for commercial radio.

After LM Radio, he would work for Springbok Radio, Swazi Music Radio out of Johannesburg, Radio 5 and Capital Radio 604 in the Transkei. He then joined the independent radio station Channel 702 on the 1 October 1981 taking over the breakfast show from Clackie McKay. The music station had started broadcasting in June 1980 in competition with Radio 5 (now 5FM), also on medium wave. By 1983, Berks was the highest paid DJ on radio in South Africa. In 1988, Berks took a year's sabbatical from the station. He was one of the key staff members that changed the direction of the station in 1988 to talk and entertainment and finally rebranding it as Talk 702, talk-news station. Berks investigated talk radio in America when Radio 5 rebranded as 5FM broadcasting nationwide in 1985 and 702 found it could not compete for audience as a medium wave channel. He would retire from 702 several times before returning one last time on the channel as John and Gary. In January 2001, John Berks retired and was replaced by Gareth Cliff.

== Death ==
Berks died in June 2022 after a long illness. He was survived by his partner of 16 years, Manda Wessels and two children from his ex wife, "Celeste Greenblatt" Lance and Sherise and grandchildren Joshua, Tia, Benjamin, Mia, and Jesse. He was buried in the Jewish section of West Park Cemetery on 7 June 2022.

== Honours ==
In 2010, he was honoured with a Lifetime Achievement Award for his work in radio in South Africa and was inducted into the Radio Hall of Fame.

He also had a laneway in Klerksdorp named in honour of him, John Berks Road.

== Filmography ==
=== Films ===
- Nipagesh Basivuv (1987)
- Deadly Passion (1985)
- Those Naughty Angels (1974)
