= Yudhika Sujanani =

South African celebrity chef

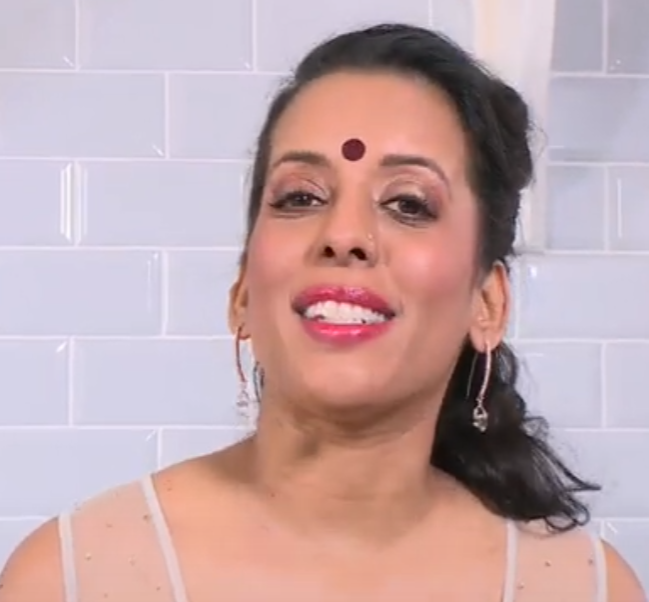
- In a 2019 cooking video
- Occupations: Chef, restaurateur, writer, activist
- Spouse: Rob Latang (m. 2012)

Yudhika Sujanani is a South African celebrity chef, restaurateur, writer and activist. She launched the Holi Cow Cooking School and Deli in February 2014.

== Career ==
Sujanani began her public career in 2009 giving cookery demonstrations at food and wine shows.

Sujanani was appointed as Celebrity Chef and Food Presenter for Sugar 'n Spice in March 2013. She also presented cookery shows for the South African Broadcasting Corporation (SABC) and was interviewed about Indian cooking by Noeleen Maholwana-Sangqu.

Sujanani has published recipes in South African newspapers and websites, including the Sunday Times, the Home Channel, Independent Online, and The Witness. She also wrote the book Curry Me Home Again and contributed to the Great South African Cookbook in 2016.

In February 2014, Sujanani launched Holi Cow Cooking School and Deli in Fourways, Johannesburg. She is brand ambassador for AMC Cookware.

Sujanani is also an activist and a Hunger Advocate for the United Nations World Food Programme.

=== Controversy ===
In 2020, Sujanani complained that an ENO advertisement depicted bunny chow in a fashion that was disrespectful to the heritage of Indians, however the Advertising Regulatory Bureau (ARB) ruled that associating bunny chow with heartburn or indigestion is not in itself offensive.

In 2021, a petition drafted by South African Indians have Rights (SAIR) directed allegations of cultural appropriation against the Holi Cow Cooking School and Deli over the company logo and food. The controversy was widely reported in the South African press. It was commented on by organisations including the World Hindu Foundation South Africa.

== Personal life ==
Sujanani married businessman Rob Latang at a private ceremony in Thailand in 2012.
