= Rory Steyn =

Rory Steyn was Nelson Mandela's former chief of security. He also served as the security liaison for the New Zealand All Blacks during the 1995 Rugby World Cup.

In 2001, Steyn published a memoir, One Step Behind Mandela: The Story of Rory Steyn, Nelson Mandela's Chief Bodyguard, co-authored with Debora Patta. In the memoir he claims that the All Blacks had "definitely been poisoned" before the 1995 Rugby World Cup Final, becoming the first high-profile South African to acknowledge any wrongdoing.
