= Swazi Music Radio =

Swazi Music Radio (SMR) was a South African radio station broadcasting from Swaziland between 1972 and 1978. It was initially established as Swaziland Commercial Radio but was soon taken over by the South African entrepreneurs Issie and Natie Kirsh as a competitor to LM Radio which broadcast from nearby Mozambique. The studios were based in central Johannesburg and the transmitters were in Sandlane in Swaziland, just across the eastern border of South Africa, not far from the small town of Amsterdam.

Programmes were recorded in Johannesburg and the tapes taken by road to the transmitting station for broadcast the next day. It had been hoped that the medium wave transmission would reach the Johannesburg area during the day, however long distance medium wave propagation in the former Transvaal Province was poor and only really effective at night. Daytime listening was on short wave.

During the years it operated, SMR recruited many of the announcers who had been on LM Radio and SABC stations, among them Gary Edwards, Frank Sanders, John Berks, Darryl Jooste, Leon Fourie, Barry O'Dee and Gordon Hoffman. Another former LM radio announcer George Wayne also returned briefly from Australia to join the station. (Stan Katz, who later went on to become one of South Africa's most prominent broadcasters, joined the station in its early days as a junior programming assistant). Overall, SMR was not commercially successful as it could not compete with the superior technical transmission of Radio 5 (now 5FM) which took over from LM Radio when that station closed in October 1975 and relocated from Mozambique to South Africa.

Operated by the South African Broadcasting Corporation, Radio 5 was heard via local medium wave transmitters in all the major cities in South Africa and also had good short wave coverage. When SMR eventually closed, the studios and transmitters were used to broadcast three ethnic radio services - Radio SR, targeted to the black African market, Radio Paralello 27 which broadcast in Portuguese and Radio Truro aimed at Indian South Africans under the direction of radio veterans Rob Vickers and Zena Watkins. These stations all closed down in the 1980s.

When commercial broadcasting licences were issued in the South African 'homeland' of Bophuthatswana, SMR's directors Natie and Issie Kirsh established Channel 702 which became Radio 702 and then Talk Radio 702. The first Channel 702 transmissions originated from the studios of the original Swazi Music Radio.
