= Dawn Lindberg =

South African singer and actress (1945–2020)

- Born: Dawn Avril Silver; 19 April 1945; Durban, Natal, South Africa
- Died: 7 December 2020 (aged 75); Plettenberg Bay, Western Cape
- Education: University of the Witwatersrand
- Occupations: Singer, Actress, Producer
- Years active: 1960–2020
- Known for: Des and Dawn; Naledi Theatre Awards
- Spouse: Des Lindberg
- Children: 2

Dawn Lindberg (19 April 1945 – 7 December 2020) was a South African folk singer, actress, theatre producer, director and founder of the South African Naledi Theatre Awards, but was more commonly known for her part in the musical folk group Des and Dawn with her husband Des Lindberg. Her career spanned almost six decades.

== Early life ==
Dawn was born in Durban, South Africa in 1945 to Julius Lionel Silver and Maida Rademeyer and was one of seven children. She would attend Parktown Girls High School in Johannesburg. As high school student, she was a AFS exchange student and was based in Detroit, Michigan in the United States, and would meet President John F. Kennedy on a trip to Washington, DC. After completing high school in 1961, she attended the University of the Witwatersrand where she studied for a Bachelor of Fine Arts. She would later obtain a Diploma in Stage Design in Salzberg and a Diploma in Graphic Arts in Urbino, Italy.

== Career ==
Des Lindberg taught her how to play the guitar while at university. He was already an accomplished folk singer and they would both perform at the Troubadour Club in Doornfontein singing compilations of protest songs by Bob Dylan and Joan Baez, some like We Shall Overcome which had been banned in South Africa. After marriage, they formed the theatre company, Cabaret and Theatre in 1965 and then spent three years travelling South Africa and Rhodesia in a caravan performing their music at informal venues to sold-out audiences. Their first album, released in 1967, Folk On Trek, would be banned in South Africa because of what censors called obscene lyrics and the copies of the record destroyed. The Seagull's Name Was Nelson was released by the duo in 1971 and spent 20 weeks on the South African charts, a subtle song about Nelson Mandela. Other subtle protest songs included This Land is your Land in 1976.

They moved into theatre production in 1973 when they produced the musical Godspell at the Holiday Inn, Maseru, Lesotho for five months. Bringing the production to South Africa was more difficult and when it ran at the University of the Witwatersrand it was banned for blasphemy. Hiring Anton Mostert, he fought their case in the supreme court and won, allowing the musical to tour the country for eighteen months.

In 1976, they produced The Black Mikado, a West End musical, in Diepkloof, Soweto with white patrons subject to unnecessary police searches on entering the township. It would eventually tour the country and at one venue, all the patrons' car tires were slashed, while the duo themselves were subjected to death threats. Theatres in South Africa would eventually open to all races in 1978.

When The Best Little Whorehouse in Texas was produced, the censors banned the word "whore" in the posters and publicity material but were again overturned in court when lawyer Jules Browde successfully argued about the confusion patrons might have with the title, The Best Little House in Texas, if they did not understand what they were coming to see.

She and Des would go on to produce ten musicals and ten plays including Pop Corn, King Afrika, The Shrew, Gloo Joo, Lennon and the Vagina Monologues.

Continuing their musical protests, at their mansion home on Houghton Ridge, Sunday soirees were conducted over the years defying a law that prohibited public entertainment on Sundays in South Africa. South African artists including Johnny Clegg, Sipho Mchunu, John Kani, Winston Ntshona, Oswald Mtshali, Abigail Kubeka, the Soweto String Quartet, Hugh Masekela, Jonas Gwangwa, and the Drakensberg Boys Choir were only some of the performers.

In 2004 Dawn conceived the idea of a theatre award to replace the Vita Awards which had ended due to lack of sponsorship and so created the Naledi Theatre Awards funded by herself and by begging for sponsorship. Internationally recognised, the award show would eventually feature on SABC television and later the cable channel KykNet.

== Marriage ==
She met her future husband, Desmond Charles Lindberg, at the university in 1962 where he was studying law. They would later marry on 4 September 1965.

== Death ==
Dawn died at a Plettenberg Bay hospital on 7 December 2020, from COVID-19 during the COVID-19 pandemic in South Africa after announcing by video message six days earlier that she had contracted the virus. She is survived by her husband Des, children Joshua, Adam and grandchildren Saria and Shia.

== Honours ==
In 2015, Minister of Arts and Culture, Nathi Mthethwa named the duo as designated Living Legends.

== Discography ==
=== Albums ===
Album	Year	Label	Notes
Folk On Trek	1967	CBS	
Unicorns, Spiders And Things	1967	CBS	
Des Lindberg And Dawn Silver On Stage In Rhodesia	1967	CBS	
What's The Difference	1968	CBS	
The Seagull's Name Was Nelson	1971	IRC	
What D'You Know?	1973	CBS	
Raindrops Whales & Dragon's Tails	1977	Music for Pleasure	
Memories Are Made Of This	1987	Gold Record Music	

=== Singles ===
Singles	Year	Label	Notes
Dawn Silver / Des And Dawn - "Mommy I Like To Be ..." / Hey! Mr. Noah	1966	CBS	
Bottle Of Wine	1968	CBS	
Des and Dawn	?	CBS	

=== Compilations ===
Singles	Year	Label	Notes
Folk-On-Trek On The Banned Wagon	1968	CBS	
Their Best	1977	Embassy	
Greatest Hits	1978	RCA Camden	
The Des & Dawn Collection	1994	Gallo Music Productions	

== Filmography ==
- Oh Brother..! (1974)
- The Men from the Ministry (1971)
