= Nick Hamman =

South African radio DJ

- Born: 16 February 1991 (age 35); Cape Town, South Africa
- Education: Rondebosch Boys' High School, Stellenbosch University
- Occupations: Radio presenter, social media personality
- Years active: 2012–present
- Height: 189 cm (6 ft 2 in)
- Website: hammyeats.co.za

Nick Hamman (born 1991) is a South African radio presenter, television contributor, and digital content creator. He is best known as the host of 5FM’s breakfast show “5Breakfast” and of “Hammy Eats,” a growing food content platform that highlights diverse South African cuisine and culture.

== Early life and education ==
Nick Hamman was born and raised in Cape Town, South Africa. He attended both Rondebosch Boys' Preparatory School and Rondebosch Boys' High School, where he excelled in the arts, particularly music and drama. He later enrolled at Stellenbosch University, where he studied politics, philosophy, and English.

== Career ==
Nick Hamman began his broadcasting career in 2011 at Stellenbosch University’s campus radio station MFM 92.6, where he hosted the afternoon drive show and worked as a producer. In 2012, he won an MTN Radio Award for Best Campus Drive Show and was the winner of Good Hope FM’s Campus DJ Search, which led to a stint hosting their weekend breakfast program.

In May 2014, Hamman joined national youth station 5FM, becoming one of the youngest presenters to host a daytime show. He hosted the weekday mid-morning show Hamman Time from 2014 to 2020. In 2020, he transitioned to the afternoon slot as the host of 5Drive, a role he held until 2024. In July 2024, he took over the station’s flagship morning show as host of 5Breakfast, a position he currently holds.

Outside of his daily radio shows, Hamman has led several innovative broadcast initiatives that blend travel and storytelling. In 2016, he undertook a 330 km Walk to Polokwane, a two-week journey on foot from Johannesburg to Polokwane that was broadcast live on 5FM. He followed this with two national Heritage Tours in 2017 and 2018, each covering over 10,000 km across South Africa, aimed at spotlighting the stories, people, and culture of the country. In 2022, Hamman traveled to Antarctica as part of the "Matrics in Antarctica" expedition, accompanying five South African students on a live broadcast experience. The following year, in 2023, he continued cross-border storytelling with 5FM’s Africa Tour, broadcasting from Mozambique to explore its people and culture.

In addition to radio, Hamman has worked across other media platforms. He was a scriptwriter and presenter on the SABC 3 television series The Insider SA, which profiled stories of South African innovation, lifestyle, and culture. He also contributed content to HuffPost in 2017, discussing music and youth issues.

In 2025, he launched the YouTube series Hammy Eats, dedicated to exploring South Africa’s food scene through stories of culture, tradition, and community. The series quickly gained traction, earning tens of thousands of views and helping spotlight small businesses and lesser-known food destinations. As a digital content creator, Hamman is widely followed on platforms like Instagram and TikTok, where he shares engaging content focused on food, people, and South African identity.

== Awards and nominations ==
Year	Award ceremony	Prize	Result
2013	MTN Radio Award	Best Afternoon Campus Drive Show	Won
