= Radio 702 =

South African radio station

702

Johannesburg; South Africa
- Broadcast area: Gauteng
- Frequencies: 92.7 MHz, 106 MHz

Programming
- Format: Adult talk radio, news and information

Ownership
- Owner: Primedia
- Sister stations: CapeTalk, 947, KFM

History
- First air date: 28 June 1980

Links
- Webcast: www.702.co.za/livestreaming

702 (also known as Talk Radio 702) is a commercial FM radio station based in Johannesburg, South Africa, broadcasting on FM 92.7 and FM 106 to the greater Gauteng province. The station is also webcast via its website. It claims to be Johannesburg's number one news and talk station, offering news, sport, business, and actuality programming, along with phone-in debates.

The station was established in 1980, originally as a music station, before transitioning to a talk format in 1988. During South Africa's apartheid era, when media was heavily censored, 702 and Capital Radio 604 were notable as independent sources of broadcast news. The station is owned by Primedia.

Until 2006, 702 was broadcast on the 702 kHz AM frequency. In March 2006, the Independent Communications Authority of South Africa (ICASA) granted the station two FM frequencies. A 12-month "double illumination" period followed, where the station broadcast on both AM and FM to manage the transition. The first FM broadcast took place on 24 July 2006, and the AM signal was shut down on 28 June 2007.

702's sister station is CapeTalk, a Cape Town-based talk radio station.

== History ==
Channel 702 was founded by entrepreneurs Natie and Issie Kirsh and began broadcasting on 28 June 1980. The station was established in the nominally independent Bantustan of Bophuthatswana, which allowed it to operate outside the control of the South African government and its restrictive broadcasting regulations. Its creation followed the launch of Capital Radio 604, another independent station that had broadcast from the Transkei but struggled with technical issues that prevented it from reliably reaching the lucrative urban audience in the southern Transvaal province. Based in Bophuthatswana, 702 could effectively cover the Johannesburg and Pretoria markets. The station's signature line was "In touch, in tune and independent."

Radio 702 was initially a music station with a Top 40 format, tagged "The Rainbow of Sound," inspired by US radio and other offshore stations like LM Radio. The Kirsh brothers had previously operated Swazi Music Radio (SMR), and many of 702's early presenters, including John Berks, Gary Edwards, and Stan Katz, had experience at SMR or LM Radio. In its early years, 702 targeted a multiracial audience, but commercial pressures led it to focus on the white market for a time. On Sunday afternoons in the 80s and early 90s, they had a show called "Solid Gold Sundays" where they would play oldies songs from the fifties and sixties.

Facing increased competition from SABC stations that had stronger FM signals, Issie Kirsh made the decision to pivot from music to a news and talk format between 1985 and 1988. This proved to be a pivotal success. As one of the only independent news broadcasters, the station became a primary source of information during a turbulent period in South Africa. According to former presenter Chris Gibbons, "If you wanted to know what was going on in South Africa in those years, you went to 702 and you went nowhere else."

Because it was based in Bophuthatswana, the South African government could not easily censor its content without undermining the homeland's supposed independence. This freedom of speech provided a crucial platform for opponents of the apartheid government. Members of banned organizations, including the ANC, used the station to voice their opinions and stay informed, and the station is recognized for having contributed to the peaceful transition to democracy.

== Name ==
Radio 702's name came from the AM frequency on which it broadcast, 702 kHz. In March 2006, the station was allocated frequencies of 92.7 MHz for Johannesburg and 106.0 MHz for Pretoria. Following a transitional period of broadcasting on both bands, the AM transmission was shut down on 28 June 2007, and the station became known simply as 702.

== Awards ==
- May 2007 – "Station of the Year" in the first BBC "Africa Radio Awards" held in Nairobi, Kenya.
- April 2011 – "Radio of the Year" at the inaugural MTN Radio Awards held in Johannesburg, South Africa.
- April 2014 – "Commercial Radio Station of the Year" in the 2014 MTN Radio Awards.

== Notable journalists ==
- Debora Patta
- Stan Katz
- Noeleen Maholwana-Sangqu
- John Robbie
- Redi Tlhabi

== See also ==
- Cape Talk
- Primedia
- Swazi Music Radio
- LM Radio
- Capital Radio 604
