= Des and Dawn Lindberg =

South African musical duo

- Genres: Folk music
- Years active: 1967–2020
- Members: Des Lindberg
- Past members: Dawn Lindberg
- Website: www.desdawn.co.za

Des and Dawn Lindberg were a South African husband and wife folk musical group who won a SARIE award in 1971 and 1973 for best vocal group.

Their first album, Folk on Trek was banned by the Apartheid government.

Their song, The Seagull's Name Was Nelson entered the charts at Number 8 in June 1971, reaching number 4 and spending twelve weeks on the charts.

Dawn died of COVID-19 related illness in 2020.

== Discography ==
=== Albums ===
Album	Year	Label	Notes
Folk On Trek	1967	CBS	
Unicorns, Spiders And Things	1967	CBS	
Des Lindberg And Dawn Silver On Stage In Rhodesia	1967	CBS	
What's The Difference	1968	CBS	
The Seagull's Name Was Nelson	1971	IRC	
What D'You Know?	1973	CBS	
Godspell		Cat	
Raindrops Whales & Dragon's Tails	1977	Music for Pleasure	
Memories Are Made Of This	1987	Gold Record Music	

=== Singles ===
Singles	Year	Label	Notes
Dawn Silver / Des And Dawn - "Mommy I Like To Be ..." / Hey! Mr. Noah	1966	CBS	
Bottle Of Wine	1968	CBS	
Des and Dawn	?	CBS	

=== Compilations ===
Singles	Year	Label	Notes
Folk-On-Trek On The Banned Wagon	1968	CBS	
Their Best	1977	Embassy	
Greatest Hits	1978	RCA Camden	
The Des & Dawn Collection	1994	Gallo Music Productions	
