= East Coast Radio (South Africa) =

Commercial radio station in KwaZulu-Natal, South Africa

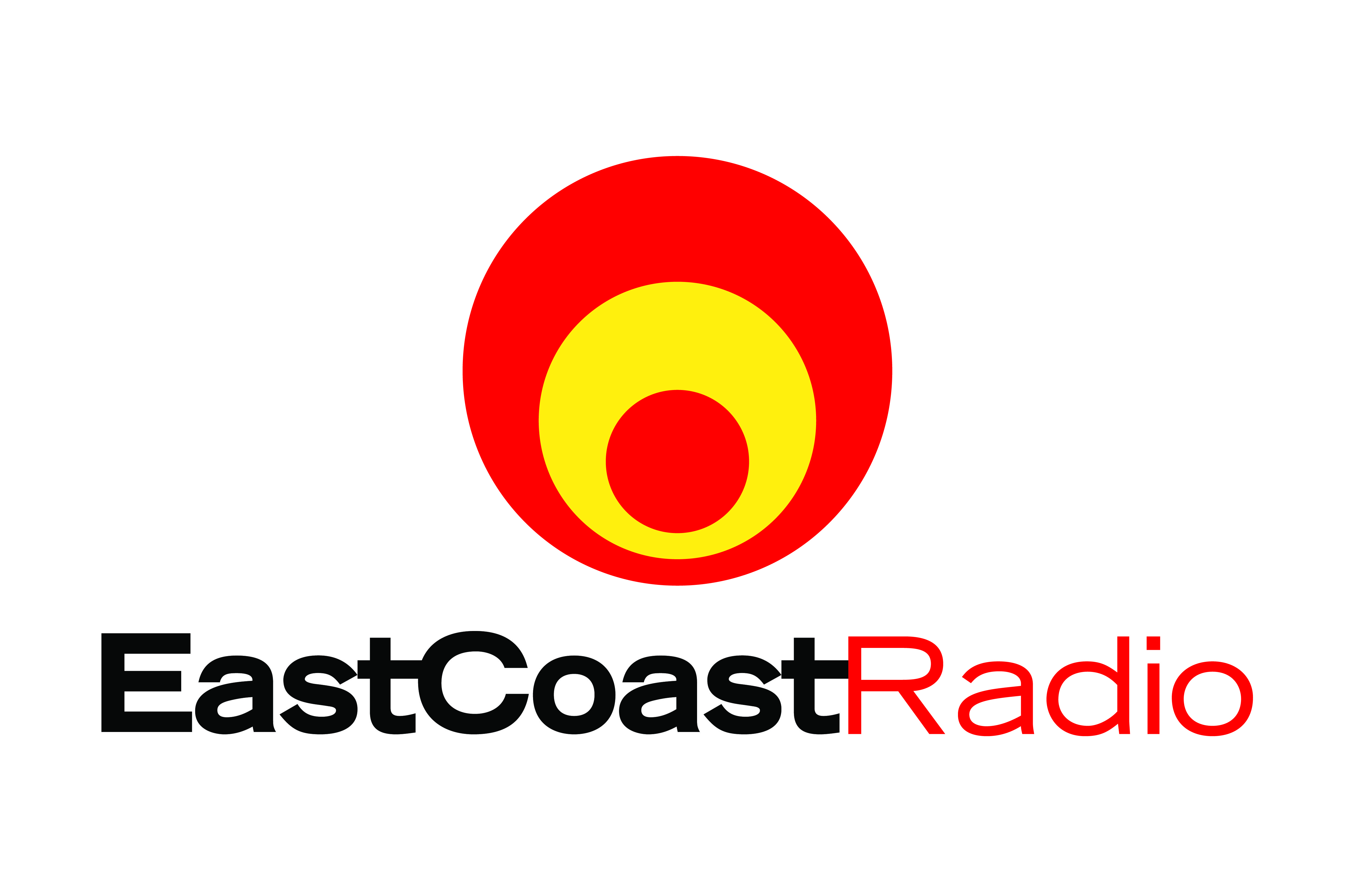
- South Africa
- Broadcast area: KwaZulu-Natal, certain areas of the Eastern Cape and Free State and small portions of Swaziland
- Frequency: 94.00 - 95.90 MHz

Programming
- Format: Contemporary

Ownership
- Owner: Kagiso Media
- Sister stations: Jacaranda FM

Links
- Website: www.ecr.co.za

East Coast Radio (ECR) is a KwaZulu-Natal commercial South African radio station with an audience of approximately 2 million. It is one of the largest regional radio stations in South Africa.

The station can also be heard online via its website and on channel 26 via Digital Worldspace Radio and is also available for listen on their app which is downloadable from the App Store and Google Play Store. It broadcasts from Umhlanga, KwaZulu-Natal. In November 2019, East Coast Radio had enabled a new online feature to listeners called East Coast Gold, which enables them to play music from the 1960s and the years that succeeded it. The station also seem to have a limited selection of music, as they constantly repeat songs.

East Coast Radio started as Radio Port Natal, broadcasting from the SABC studios in Old Fort Road, Durban on 1 May 1967. When the station upgraded its technology to include stereo broadcasts, it was rebranded to RPN Stereo. It was sold to the Kagiso Media Group on 1 July 1994.

The list of former radio presenters includes Daryl Ilbury, Alan Khan, Dave Guselli, Di Brophy, Damon Beard, Paul Harper, Nigel Maud, Tim Thabethe, Clayton Robbertze, Omar Essack, Mags van der Westhuizen, Mel Massyn, Makhosi Khoza, Lev David and Ravi R, Minnie Ntuli, Keri Miller, Vic Naidoo, Mike V, Jane Linley Thomas amongst others. And the current presenters are, Darren Maule, Carmen Reddy, Sky Tshabalala, Carol Ofori, Stacey Norman, J Sbu, Tee Xaba, Sam Cele, Buhle Hlatshwayo, Andy James, Sershen Moodeliar, Nick Taithen, Danny Guselli.

ECR is also a leading host in the Province of KwaZulu-Natal, planning and putting on great events, such as The Toy Story charity drive, The Big Walk, and even Durban Day. ECR dominates in the affluent LSM 6-10 urban group in KwaZulu-Natal with an operating profit margin of 50.8% in 2006.

East Coast Radio is a sister station to Jacaranda FM based in Pretoria.

In 2015 the station appointed former KZN Tourism Marketing manager Boni Mchunu as its General Manager.

East Coast Radio has long term sponsorship partnerships with sports teams based in KwaZulu-Natal, including Super Rugby outfit, The Sharks, soccer outfit AmaZulu as well as cricket franchise The Sunfoil Dolphins.

== Award & Recognition ==
The station has won several coveted MTN radio awards including the 2011 prize for Best News and Actuality Producer for "150 Years: Relive The Legacy."

The feature, which aired from 1 November to 16 November 2010 looking back to when the first indentured Indians arrived in South Africa.

In 2014 The Drive with Damon team won an MTN Radio Award for Best Promotions/Stunt, while the station's imaging producer, Salendran Thulukanam, was honoured as an MTN Radio Awards Bright Star.

In 2015 Damon Beard, who hosts The Big Favour every week, where deserving individuals and organisations receive assistance, trumped other national nominees to be named Best Community Project.

East Coast Radio journalist, Khatija Nxedlana, was recognised as a young achiever. She was honoured with membership to the exclusive MTN Radio Awards Bright Stars Club.

== Events & Functions ==
East Coast Radio Big walk

The Big Walk is KZN's largest outdoor event with 30 000 walkers annually. The first edition of the event which was held in 2004 had just over 1 800 participants. The walk has 5 km, 10 km, 15 km and 20 km routes.

Durban Day.

Durban day is an annual outdoor music event hosted by East Coast Radio every September. The event has been held annually at the Moses Mabhida Stadium People's Park in recent years and attracts over 15 000 music lovers. Some of South Africa's top music acts have graced the Durban Day including Lira, Prime Circle, AKA, Khuli Chana, Mango Groove and The Parlotones.

ECR Toy Story

East Coast Radio Toy Story is the station's annual CSI initiative and seeks to collect toys and cash donations for underprivileged children in KwaZulu-Natal. The drive has been running for more than 15 years and has grown year on year since its inception. In 2015 more than 100 000 new toys were donated to charity drive.

As part of the initiative East Coast Radio hosts its Corporate Day Challenge. Here celebrities and jocks from the station donate their time to take pledges from corporates. In 2014, a record-breaking R1.6 million was raised, the following year just over R1.2 million was raised during the challenge.

== Shows ==
Weekdays (Monday-Friday)

00:00-04:00 Automation (Music)

04:00-06:00 The Fresh Start with Ndabe Zondi

06:00-09:00 East Coast Breakfast with Darren, Sky and Carmen

09:00-12:00 Mid-morning Hangout with Carol Ofori

12:00-15:00 Midday Ease with Danny Guselli

15:00-18:00 East Coast Drive with Stacey & J Sbu

18:00-21:00 Trending Tonight with Deon G

21:00-00:00 The Wrap with Tee Xaba (Monday-Thursday)

18:00-22:00 East Coast Party People (Friday) Deon G

22:00-01:00 East Coast Urban Sam Cele (Friday)

Weekends (Saturday-Sunday)

Saturday

01:00-06:00 Automation (Music)

06:00-10:00 The Weekend Breakfast with Mike V

10:00-14:00 ECR 40 Countdown with Styles Mbatha

14:00-17:00 Wind-down with Shaina-Rae

17:00-18:00 East Coast Breakfast (Catch-up/Highlights)

18:00-21:00 East Coast Party People with Deon G

21:00-01:00 East Coast Urban with Sam Cele

Sunday

01:00-06:00 Automation (Music)

06:00-10:00 The Weekend Breakfast with Mike V

10:00-14:00 The Weekend Hangout with Styles Mbatha

14:00-17:00 Wind-down with Shaina-Rae

17:00-18:00 East Coast Drive (Highlights/Catch-up)

18:00-21:00 Local Hits with Deon G

21:00-01:00 East Coast Urban with Sam Cele

== Listenership figures ==
Estimated Listenership
	7 Day	Ave. Mon-Fri
May 2023	1 983 000	1 892 000
June 2021	2 001 000	1 967 000
May 2020	1 873 000	1 002 000
Feb 2019	1 679 000	913 000
Dec 2017	1 686 000	893 000
Oct 2016	1 684 000	913 000
Aug 2015	1 747 000	916 000
Jun 2014	1 726 000	912 000
