= Alan Khan =

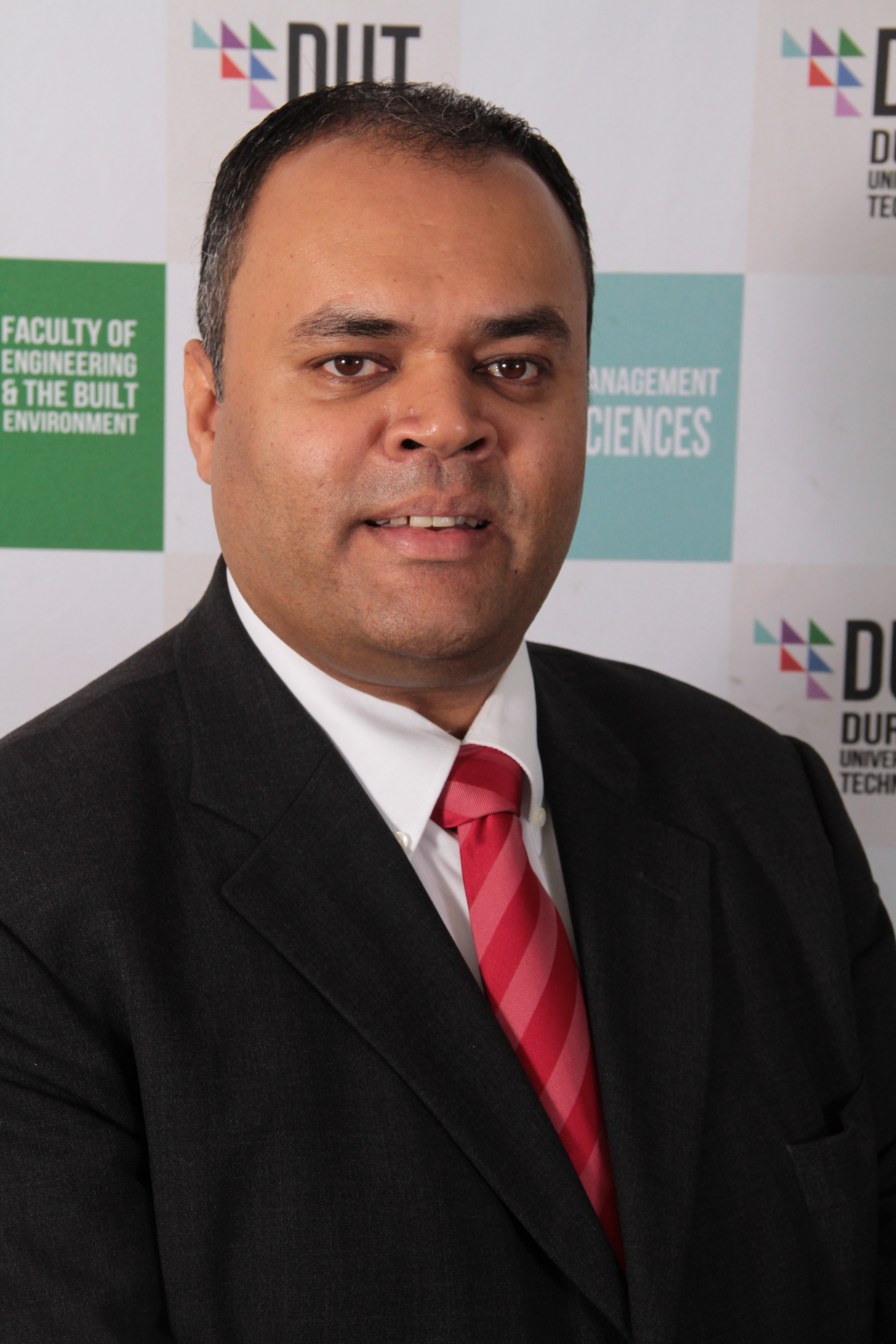
Alan Khan, South African radio, TV & media personality

Alan Khan (born 17 December 1971) is a South African media and radio personality. He hosts the talk show Walk the Talk with Alan Khan on Lotus FM. In April 2015 Khan was inducted into the South African Radio Hall of Fame.

He is currently the Senior Director of Corporate Affairs at the Durban University of Technology in Durban. Khan married clinical sociologist Professor Mariam Seedat Khan in March 1997. They met after he had interviewed her on his talk show Capital Live on Capital Radio 604. They have two sons.

In February 2026, after a six year absence on South African radio, Alan Khan returned to the airwaves on Hot 102.7FM. https://iol.co.za/sunday-tribune/news/2026-02-20-alan-khan-returns-to-the-airwaves-on-sundays/

Khan was born in Durban, South Africa. Before joining DUT, he was CEO of Jacaranda FM and Deputy managing director of East Coast Radio. He was also a presenter on Capital Radio 604 and on East Coast Radio in Durban, presented F1 Powerboat Series on DStv Super Sport and he also co-hosted am2day national breakfast TV on SABC. In 2017, he won Best Actuality News and Talk Show at the South African Radio Awards. Khan hosted the 2018 World Travel Awards and co-hosted the launch of the Orphans of AIDS Trust with former President Nelson Mandela and Mark Shuttleworth, who was the first African in space. He also co-hosted the 2018 BRICS International Film Awards.
