= Capital Radio 604 =

Defunct South African radio station

South Africa
- Broadcast area: South Africa
- Frequencies: 603 & 558 kHz & various short wave

History
- First air date: 26 December 1979
- Last air date: 29 November 1996

Capital Radio 604 was a radio station that broadcast to listeners in South Africa from transmitters located in the Transkei using Medium Wave (AM) on 603 kHz.

Founded by Martin Rattle, the station started transmitting on 26 December 1979 and was shut down in 1996, as it was no longer financially viable. Capital Radio 604 had often supported the anti-apartheid liberation struggle and many highlighted the irony; that it was under the very same government that Capital and its staff had fought for in the past that the station would have had to close down.

Capital Radio 604 changed radio in South Africa forever when it introduced listeners to uncensored music, polished presenters, uncensored news, and great jingles. Previously, the state run radio stations (no private stations were allowed) were not allowed to tell the real news or play certain songs or music from certain bands.

While this station is off the air now, an archive web site (Capital Radio 604) exists that contains many photos, video, jingles, and recent interviews with ex-604 personnel. There is also a podcast which allows listeners to hear re-broadcasts of old shows which originally aired in the 1980s.

Capital Radio 604 was an almost carbon copy of Capital Radio 194 (1548 kHz) in London (which later split to become Capital Gold and Capital FM). Capital Radio 194 operated on Medium Wave at 194 metres (hence the name) and veteran broadcasting executive Michael Bukht, Capital Radio London's first programme controller, acted as consultant to 604. Capital Radio 604 actually operated on 603 kHz, Medium Wave, but promoted a frequency to which the jingles would rhyme.

Bill Mitchell returned to re-word the deep gravelly voice drop-ins and simply said 604 instead of 194. Many presenters were chosen because they sounded like presenters that were already on Capital 194. Finally the Capital 194 logo was slightly modified by changing 194's swallow to a seagull (as a symbol of freedom) and obviously changing the number to 604.

Some of the household names who presented shows on Capital included Alan Mann, Dave Simons, Steve Smith, Darren Scott, John Berks, Jim Ellery, Tony Newman, Martin Bailie, Oscar Renzi, Kevin Savage, Tony Murrell, Alan Khan, Dave Guselli, Allan Pierce, Steve Crozier, Justice Ramahlola, Steve Bishop, Lee Downs, Barry Lambert, Wolfman Jack, Richard Jones, Noeleen Maholwana-Sangqu, Kenny Maistry, Jeremy Mansfield, Tony Blewitt, Brian Oxley, Treasure Tshabalala and former Magic 1548 Liverpool presenter Richard Jardine, brother of ITV1 Formula One pundit Tony Jardine.

'Independent Radio News' on 603, based in Johannesburg, was the first radio news service in South Africa not controlled by government although it conformed with South African media laws. The news department boasted a team of experienced radio journalists including Will Bernard, Gary Edwards, Julian Potter as well as Paddi Clay, Gwen Lister, Michael Letellier, Mike Hanna, David O'Sullivan, James Lorimer, Manu Padayachee, Zahed Cachalia, Nigel Wrench and Beatrice Hollyer. It later included Reuben Goldberg, Cassandra Moodley, Jeremy Thorpe, John Maytham, Andrew Bolton and Shaun Johnson
