= Kfm Breakfast =

- Genre: Morning Zoo, music (Hot AC), comedy, talk
- Running time: 3 hours: 06h00 – 09h00 Monday through Friday
- Country of origin: South Africa
- Languages: English; Afrikaans
- Home station: 94.5 Kfm
- Hosted by: Darren "Whackhead" Simpson
- Starring: Deon Bing; Jeremy Harris; Liezel van der Westhuizen; Stephen Werner
- Executive producer: Stephen Werner
- Original release: 28 January 2002 – present
- Audio format: FM, online and digital satellite (DStv audio channel: 180)
- Website: http://www.kfm.co.za/
- Podcast

Kfm Breakfast is the morning drive show on radio station 94.5 Kfm. It is the biggest breakfast show in the Western Cape, South Africa. 94.5 Kfm broadcasts to over 1.1 million listeners across a large section of south western South Africa.

== Show format ==
Kfm Breakfast runs for three hours, with news read half-hourly in both English and Afrikaans between 06h00 and 09h00. Sports is read on the half-hour between 07h00 and 09h00.

The show relies on a number of on-air contributors, and often includes members of the production team, news and sport readers and other studio guests.

== Team members ==
- Darren "Whackhead" Simpson – Host
- Ryan O'Connor – host since June 2008
- Jeremy Harris – sports anchor
- Liezel van der Westhuizen – traffic reporter
- Deon Bing – Kfm Surf Report
- Stephen Werner – producer, since 2007–2008; previously produced Breakfast with Aden Thomas on 94.5 Kfm's sister station, 567 CapeTalk

=== Notable former team members ===
- Ian Bredenkamp – Executive Producer from 2002 to September 2007; moved into a management position at 94.5 Kfm in September 2007
- Lizma van Zyl – original Afrikaans newsreader on Kfm Breakfast; left in July 2008 to continue her studies and complete her doctorate
- Lance Witten – one of the show's producers in 2007 and early 2008; left to join E.tv's 24-hour news channel
- Wesley Petersen – sports anchor 2003–2009; now the national sports editor for EyeWitness News

== Daily features ==
The show is known for its daily features:

- GK Teens, where learners throughout the Western Cape call in and two contestants go head-to-head. They are given 60 seconds each to answer as many general knowledge questions as possible. A monthly leader board charts the daily contestants' success, and the months' winners face each other in a showdown at the end of the season. Each winner receives a cash prize.
- O'Connic 80's is a daily selection of O'Connor's favourite music hits from the eighties.
