= Enzelsberg =

Farmstead name and VHF repeater

Coordinates: 25°36′S 26°15′E

Enzelsberg is the name of a farmstead in the North West Province of South Africa, situated in the Marico Bushveld north of the N4 highway between Groot Marico and Zeerust.

It is also the site of a Sentech VHF repeater.
