= Gelukskroon transmitter =

Gelukskroon transmitter is a large FM-/TV-transmission facility near Pretoria, South Africa. It consists of several towers among them a 112.8 metres (370 ft) tall partially guyed lattice tower standing on the roof of a building, which is the tallest tower of the facility, and a telecommunication tower built of concrete.
