= Radio Bantu =

Radio Bantu was the SABC's Apartheid-era black radio station, broadcasting in vernacular languages other than English and Afrikaans. It was the corporation's fourth radio network, after Radio South Africa, Radio Suid Afrika and Springbok Radio; broadcasts commenced on 1 June 1960 in Zulu and gradually spread to increase other languages. The network was shut down by the mid-1980s, when the corporation decided to split it into several language-based radio stations. More recently, the SABC revived the station as an SABC+ service.

== History ==
Radio Bantu opened at 6:30am on 1 June 1960, initially broadcasting six hours a day. By 1973, the station broadcast in seven Bantu languages and the sum of the stations of the network attracted four million listeners for 87 hours a day. The main service provided schools broadcasts which had an audience of 700,000 students in 6,000 schools. School broadcasts commenced in 1964.

The introduction of Radio Bantu had an effect on radio ownership among black people in South Africa, rising from 15% in 1962 to 49% at the end of 1967. In 1969, a peaktime quarter hour's worth of programming attracted one million listeners.

The introduction of FM led to the creation of separate language-based Radio Bantu stations. These were Radio Sesotho (1 January 1962), Radio Zulu (1 January 1962), Radio Setswana (1 January 1962), Radio Lebowa (1 June 1962), Radio Tsonga (1 February 1965), Radio Xhosa (1966), Radio Swazi (1982) and Radio Ndebele (16 March 1983). The SABC restructured itself in 1996, ditched the Radio Bantu brand and gave new names to the stations, descendants of the former Radio Bantu network. Very little of its content, as much as forty programmes, have been preserved, the oldest record dating from 1960. The SABC maintains since 2024 a digital-only network bearing the name, and is scouting for regional stations for archives. Programming is updated monthly and airs from 6am to 11pm.
