= Jeremy Mansfield =

South African broadcaster (1963–2022)

- Born: Robert Jeremy Mansfield; 15 August 1963; Grahamstown, Cape Province, South Africa
- Died: 31 October 2022 (aged 59); South Africa
- Other name: Jem Jerome
- Education: Kingswood College
- Alma mater: Rhodes University
- Occupation: Radio presenter
- Known for: Radio presenting, television presenting
- Spouses: Cornelia Agnes Schulz (1988 - 1997); Jacqui Thompson (2003 - )
- Children: Gabriella

Robert Jeremy Clayton Mansfield (15 August 1963 – 31 October 2022) was a South African radio and television celebrity. He worked on numerous radio stations as a presenter, and also presented numerous television shows and inserts for popular television magazine programs.

== Early life ==
Mansfield was born in Grahamstown, South Africa. He attended school at Kingswood College. He remained in Grahamstown attending Rhodes University, where he studied speech, drama and journalism.

== Media career ==
=== Radio ===
In 1993 he became as a regular presenter of 702's Saturday Afternoon magazine program. In 1995, Mansfield took over hosting of the afternoon show.

In 1997, Mansfield moved to 702 Talk Radio's sister station 94.7 Highveld Stereo where he created and hosted the hugely popular weekday breakfast show, The Rude Awakening which at its peak was the most commercially successful show in southern Africa with over 1.5 million listeners.

In 2009, he was diagnosed with chronic lymphocytic leukemia and received six months of medical treatment. In June 2010, Mansfield announced he would be leaving the show. He hosted his last show on Monday 12 July 2010.

=== Television and film ===
In the mid-1990s, Mansfield started appearing as a features contributor and guest presenter on South African Pay television channels M-Net for Front Row and SuperSport. In 1998 he left the channel and started presenting A Word or 2, on SABC 2. The show ran for 10 seasons.

In 2010, Mansfield was cast in Disney's local release of Toy Story 3 as the voice of Lifer.

In 2010, Mansfield hosted his own weekly finance show, Mansfield's Moneysense on CNBC Africa.

=== CDs, books and tableware ===
Mansfield released five CDs containing characters he created on-air, humorous stories and songs (most of which he wrote himself) poking fun at many South African personalities and situations.

Mansfield lent his name to a number of joke books, of which Vrot Jokes is a South African bestseller.

With his wife, Jacqui, he wrote the multi award-winning contemporary cookbook titled Zhoozsh! in February 2009. It won over seven awards including Best Cook Book in South Africa and Third Best Cook Book in the World at the Gourmand Awards. Their second cookbook, Zhoozsh! Faking It is also an award-winner. Both books are best-sellers and resulted in their own range of tableware, Zhoozsh, sold through home decor stores.

== Death ==
Mansfield was diagnosed with liver cancer in January 2022. He died on 31 October 2022, at the age of 59.

== Awards and accolades ==
1985: AA Vita Award as The Most Promising Young South African Actor

1996–2010: Best Radio Personality of the year (Best of Johannesburg Readers' Choice Awards)

2008: Three wins in the South African sector of the Gourmand Cookbook Awards for Jeremy and Jacqui Mansfield: wins Book of the Year, Innovative and Media for Zhoozsh!
