= Primedia =

South African media group

- Company type: Private
- Industry: Broadcasting, Advertising
- Founded: Johannesburg (1994)
- Founder: The Kirsh Consortium
- Headquarters: Sandton, Johannesburg, South Africa
- Key people: Phumzile Langa Chair of Primedia Board; Jonathan Procter (Group CEO)
- Revenue: R1.8 billion
- Owner: Private
- Website: www.primedia.co.za

Primedia is a South African media group, headquartered in Sandton, Johannesburg.

== History ==
Primedia was established in 1994 and its listing on the JSE Securities Exchange was completed in April 1995. Primedia remained listed on the JSE until 1 October 2007, when its listing was terminated following a successful private equity transaction (scheme of arrangements).

The Primedia Group is backed by Mineworkers' Investment Company (MIC), Ethos, the FirstRand Group and the Old Mutual Group (Old Mutual Private Equity and Old Mutual Specialised Finance) who are major shareholders.

Primedia's advertising businesses are located principally in South Africa. This includes radio broadcasting, outdoor advertising, commuter and other out of home media, and spans both the traditional and non-traditional media sectors.

== Subsidiaries ==
=== Primedia Broadcasting ===
Primedia Broadcasting is a subsidiary of Primedia, headquartered in Sandton, Johannesburg. It currently operates four national radio stations and the Eyewitness News service. Primedia was established in 1994 with Stan Katz appointed CEO and its listing on the JSE Securities Exchange completed in April 1995. Primedia remained listed on the JSE until 1 October 2007, when its listing was terminated following a successful private equity transaction (scheme of arrangements).

==== Radio Stations ====
- CapeTalk: CapeTalk is a commercial AM radio station based in Cape Town, South Africa, broadcasting on AM/MW 567 to Cape Town. The station is also webcast via its website. It was established in 1997.
- 702: 702, is a commercial talk FM radio station based in Johannesburg, South Africa, broadcasting on FM 92.7 and FM 106 to the greater Gauteng province. The station is also webcast via its website.
- KFM: KFM is a radio station based in Cape Town, South Africa.
- 947: 947 is a radio station that broadcasts on the 94.7FM frequency from Johannesburg, Gauteng, South Africa.

==== News Services ====
- Eyewitness News: Eyewitness News is Primedia Broadcasting's news brand.

==== Civic Organisations ====
- Crimeline: Crimeline is an independent Initiative started by Primedia aimed at helping South African authorities fight crime through anonymous tip-offs.
- Lead SA: Lead SA is a Primedia Broadcasting initiative, supported by Independent Newspapers to promote active citizenship. Founded in August 2010, shortly after the historic 2010 Soccer World Cup, Lead SA was born to celebrate the achievements of the country while taking responsibility for its problems and challenges. Lead SA's focus areas include education, road safety and the environment.

==== Talent Management ====
- PrimeTalent: PrimeTalent is a talent management company aimed at providing a range of professional services to Primedia Broadcasting's on air talent.

=== New Home of Primedia and The Services ===
- Primedia Plus (also known as Primedia+): New Streaming Service for people to tune in their favourite radio stations 702, 947, CapeTalk and KFM and explore video and audio content which is on the website to sign up and stream radio stations and catch up episodes.

=== Advertising, Marketing & Promotions ===
- Cinemark: Cinemark is an advertising sales company that represents Ster-Kinekor and selected independent cinemas.
- Out of Home
- Primedia Outdoor: Primedia Outdoor is a national outdoor advertising media specialist. Part of the Out-of-Home division of Primedia (Pty) Ltd, Primedia Outdoor focuses primarily on the marketing and sales of outdoor advertising signage. It offers national outdoor exposure across a mix of media types, including digital signs, airport advertising, freeway and suburban spectaculars and street furniture. Primedia Outdoor targets consumers in major urban areas through to those living in rural communities in Limpopo and the Eastern Cape. ComutaNet offers advertising that ranges from the interior and exterior of buses, taxis and trains to station platforms, taxi rank and trailer advertising, as well as radio and TV offerings.
- Primedia Instore Primedia Instore deals with the installation, maintenance and removal of point of sale advertisements on behalf of FMCG (Fast-Moving Consumer Goods) companies in retail stores.
- Primedia Africa currently operates in Botswana, Lesotho, Mozambique, Namibia, Eswatini, Zambia, Kenya, Uganda, Nigeria and Ghana. Supplier of outdoor media in the SADC regions, offering various media formats specific to clients' needs.
- Primedia Lifestyle: Primedia Lifestyle Group is the No.1 integrated shopping centre marketing company in South Africa. Founded in 1996, the Primedia Lifestyle Group, a Primedia Unlimited subsidiary delivers marketing services to over 35 Shopping centres nationwide, ranging from Convenience Centres to Super-Regional's. The company offerings include Primedia Lifestyle Marketing Services (marketing strategy, budget management, brand management, research, tenant relations, events, PR and Exhibitions), Red Pixel (creative, production and design) and Media Xpress (media planning, buying and strategy)
- Primedia Unlimited: Primedia Unlimited is the creative media hub of the Primedia group in the out of home arena through 10 different companies:
- Fashion Media: Fashion Media specializes in Retail Media holding the exclusive static media rights to in-store advertising for Edgars, Edgars Active and Red Square stores nationwide.
- Mall Active Mall Active is a mall activation company specialising in running activations in shopping malls in South Africa.
- Mall Worx: In-mall advertising in the township and middle LSM mall environment
- Source CRM: Source is a full service digital agency specializing in mall CRM & Loyalty.
- Wideopen Platform: Wideopen offers outdoor advertising.
- XP Digital: A subsidiary of Primedia Unlimited, XP Digital has the sole advertising rights to 42" HD screens located at dispensaries in Clicks and Dis-Chem pharmacies nationwide
- Salon Media: Advertising in hair salons nationally. Including mirror decals, digital screens and activations.
- Fitting Exposure: Fitting exposure offers exposure for clients in the Jet, Edgars, Ackermans, and Legit fitting room space.
