= CapeTalk =

South African radio station

Coordinates: 33°54′46″S 18°24′59″E

Cape Town; South Africa
- Broadcast area: Western Cape
- Frequency: 567 kHz

Programming
- Format: News/Talk

Ownership
- Owner: Primedia Broadcasting
- Sister stations: Talk Radio 702, Kfm 94.5, 947

History
- First air date: 14 October 1997

Links
- Webcast: via website via TuneIn
- Website: www.capetalk.co.za

CapeTalk is a commercial AM radio station based in Cape Town, South Africa, broadcasting on AM/MW 567 to Cape Town. The station is also webcast via its website. It claims to be Cape Town's number one news and talk station, offering news, sport, business and actuality programming, with a high proportion of its airtime filled with phone-in debates. It was established in 1997. The station is owned by Primedia.

CapeTalk's sister station is 702, a Johannesburg based FM radio station.

== History ==
The station first broadcast at 06h00 on Tuesday, 14 October 1997 by John Maytham from their offices on Bree Street. From the start the station sought to position itself to provide an independent forum for Capetonians to swap ideas and voice opinions. Former presenters include the former Sunday Times columnist Jani Allan between 1997 and 2000.

== Current studios ==
The studios are now located at Suite 7d, Somerset Square, Highfield Road, Greenpoint, Cape Town. The station relocated in 2006 after its sister station KFM became a subsidiary of Primedia (PTY) Ltd. and bigger premises were needed to house both stations in one building.

== Presenters ==
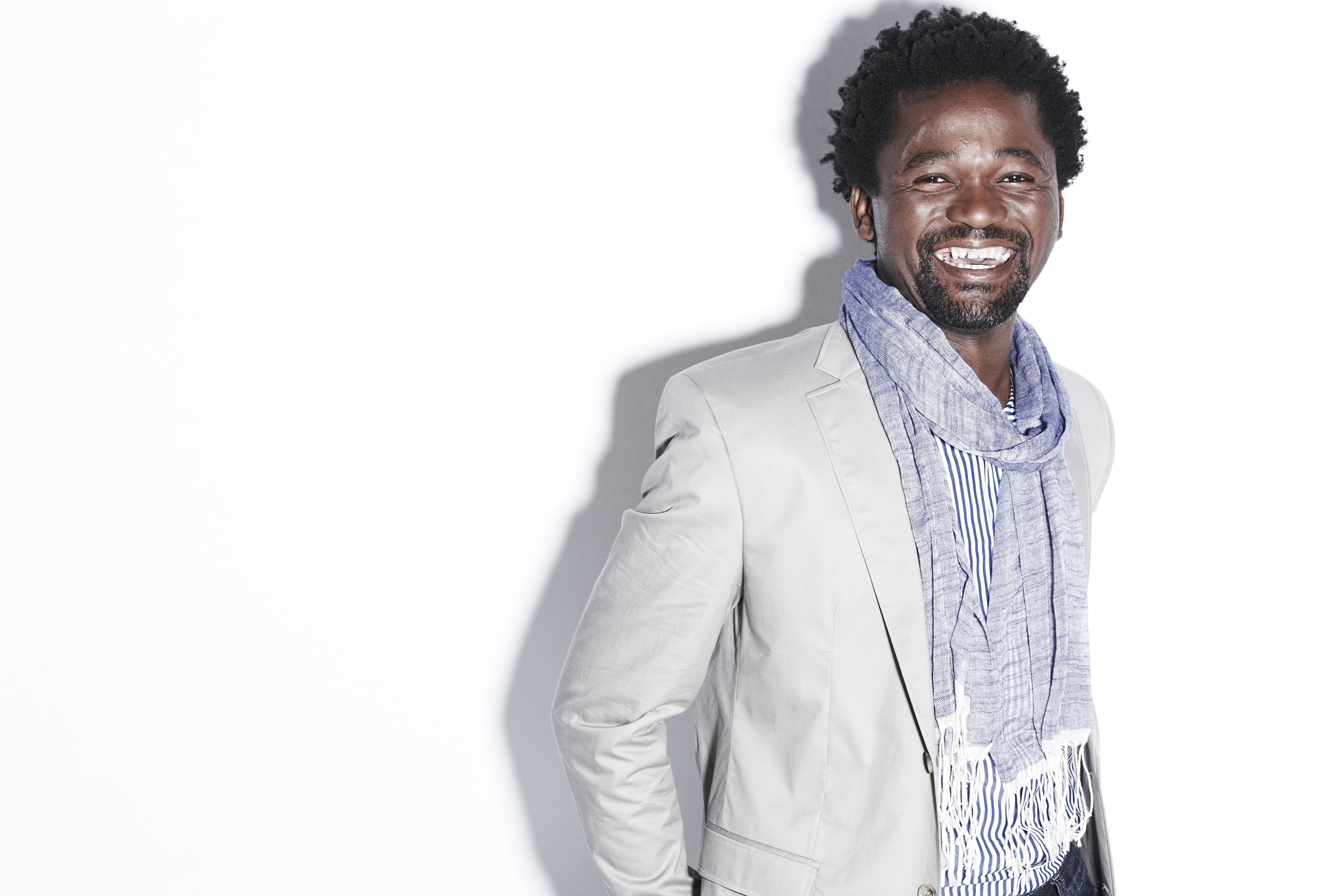
Africa Melane

There are a range of presenters on Cape Talk (and on 702) that host various shows. The Cape-based presenters include:

- Sara-Jayne King
- Pippa Hudson
- Africa Melane
- John Maytham
- Stephen Grootes
- Kieno Kammies
- Marc Lewis

== Broadcast time ==
- 24/7

== Listenership figures ==
Estimated Listenership
| | 7 Day | Ave. Mon-Fri |
|---|---|---|
| Feb 2013 | 104 000 | 64 000 |
| Dec 2012 | 119 000 | 66 000 |
| Oct 2012 | 124 000 | 75 000 |
| Aug 2012 | 125 000 | 74 000 |
| Jun 2012 | 147 000 | 78 000 |

== See also ==
- 702 Talk Radio
- Primedia
