= Kfm 94.5 =

South African radio station

Coordinates: 33.912730°S 18.416517°E

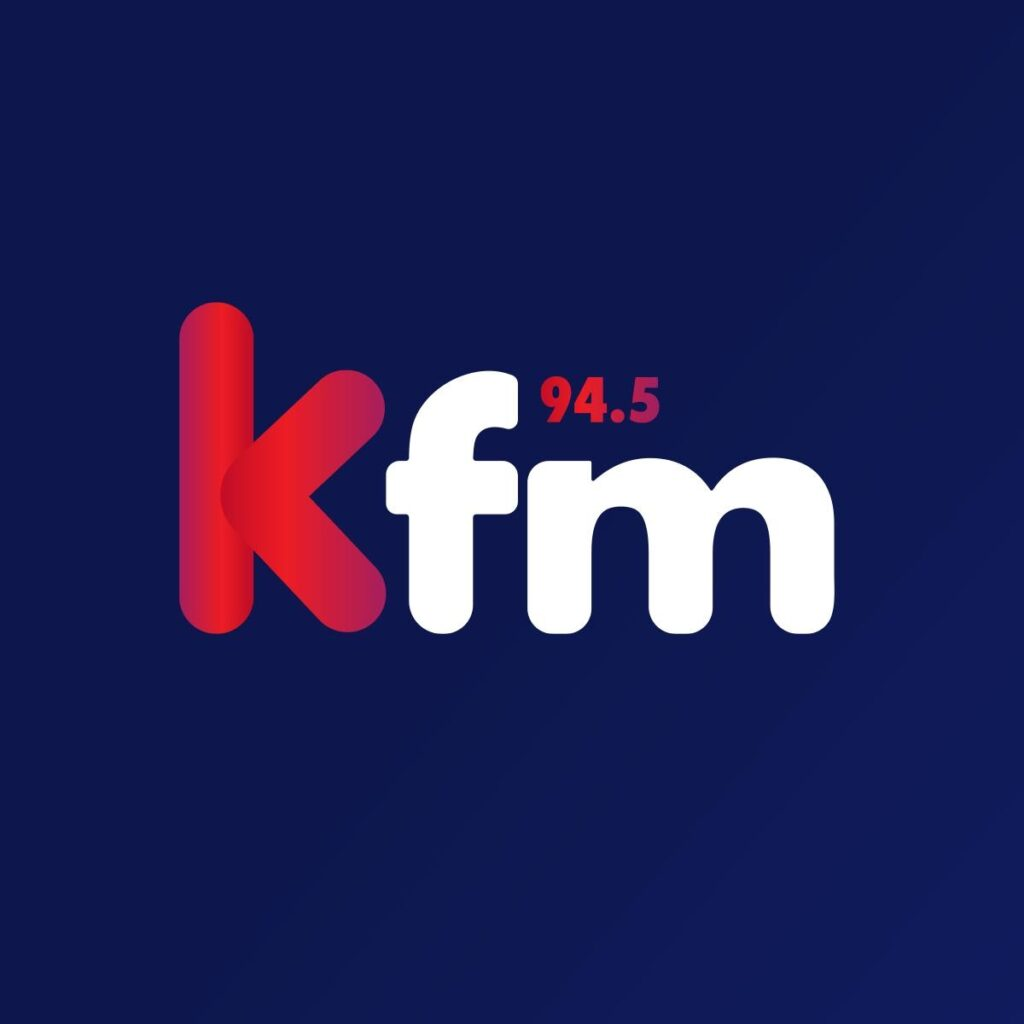
- Cape Town; South Africa
- Broadcast area: Western Cape (Terrestrial FM); Africa (DStv Satellite )
- Frequency: 94.5 MHz
- RDS: Most Music. Feel Great. - Kfm94.5

Programming
- Format: Hot AC

Ownership
- Owner: Primedia (private)
- Sister stations: 947

History
- Former names: 94.5 KFM or KFM

Links
- Website: Official website

Kfm 94.5 is a hot adult contemporary radio station based in Cape Town, South Africa

== Format and Programming ==
Kfm 94.5 plays an Hot Adult Contemporary format, with talk during the morning. The station is also affiliated with Eyewitness News, which provides news, along with sport and local events..

The station target listeners in the 25 to 49 age group living in the Western Cape. Kfm's reception area includes the metropolitan area of Cape Town and towns such as Mossel Bay, George, Knysna, Hermanus, Oudtshoorn, Caledon, Worcester, Malmesbury, Saldanha and Beaufort West . The reception area includes the West Coast as far as Alexander Bay and parts of the Northern Cape and even as far as the Eastern Cape in Graaf Reinet. Kfm delivers local news and traffic around Cape Town with their affiliate Eyewitness News, as well as other regular inserts of news, sport and traffic.

== LeadSA ==
Kfm promotes LeadSA, a Primedia Broadcasting initiative. LeadSA promotes ordinary citizens to take pride in, and contribute to their country.

== Presenters & Crew ==
Weekday Lineup
Show	Presenters	Days	Times
Early Mornings with	Liezel van der Westhuizen	Mon - Fri	05:00 - 06:00
Kfm Mornings with	Darren Simpson - (Co-host)	Mon - Fri	06:00 - 09:00
Kfm Mornings with	Sherlin Barends - (Co-host and Traffic)	Mon - Fri	06:00 - 09:00
Kfm Mornings with	Sibongile Mafu - (Co-host and Sport)	Mon - Fri	06:00 - 09:00
Mid-Mornings with	Tracey Lange	Mon - Fri	09:00 - 12:00
Lunch with	EB Inglis	Mon - Fri	12:00 - 15:00
The Flash Drive with	Carl Wastie	Mon - Fri	15:00 - 19:00
The Flash Drive with	Cassidy Nicholson	Mon - Fri	15:00 - 19:00
Kfm Nights with	Brandon Leigh and Ute Hermanus	Mon - Fri	19:00 - 22:00

Weekend Lineup
Show	Presenters	Days	Times
Kfm Weekend Afternoons	Mitch Matyana	Sat - Sun	14:00 - 18:00
Weekend Breakfast with	Stan Mars	Saturdays	07:00 - 10:00
The Kfm Top 40 with	Carl Wastie	Saturdays	10:00 - 14:00
Saturday Spin	Jono Duguid	Saturdays	18:00 - 21:00
Early Sundays with	Danté Poole	Sundays	05:00 - 07:00
Weekend Breakfast with	Stan Mars	Sundays	07:00 - 10:00
Sundays with	Saskia Falken	Sundays	10:00 - 14:00
Sunday Nights With	Grandmaster Ready D	Sundays	18:00 - 21:00

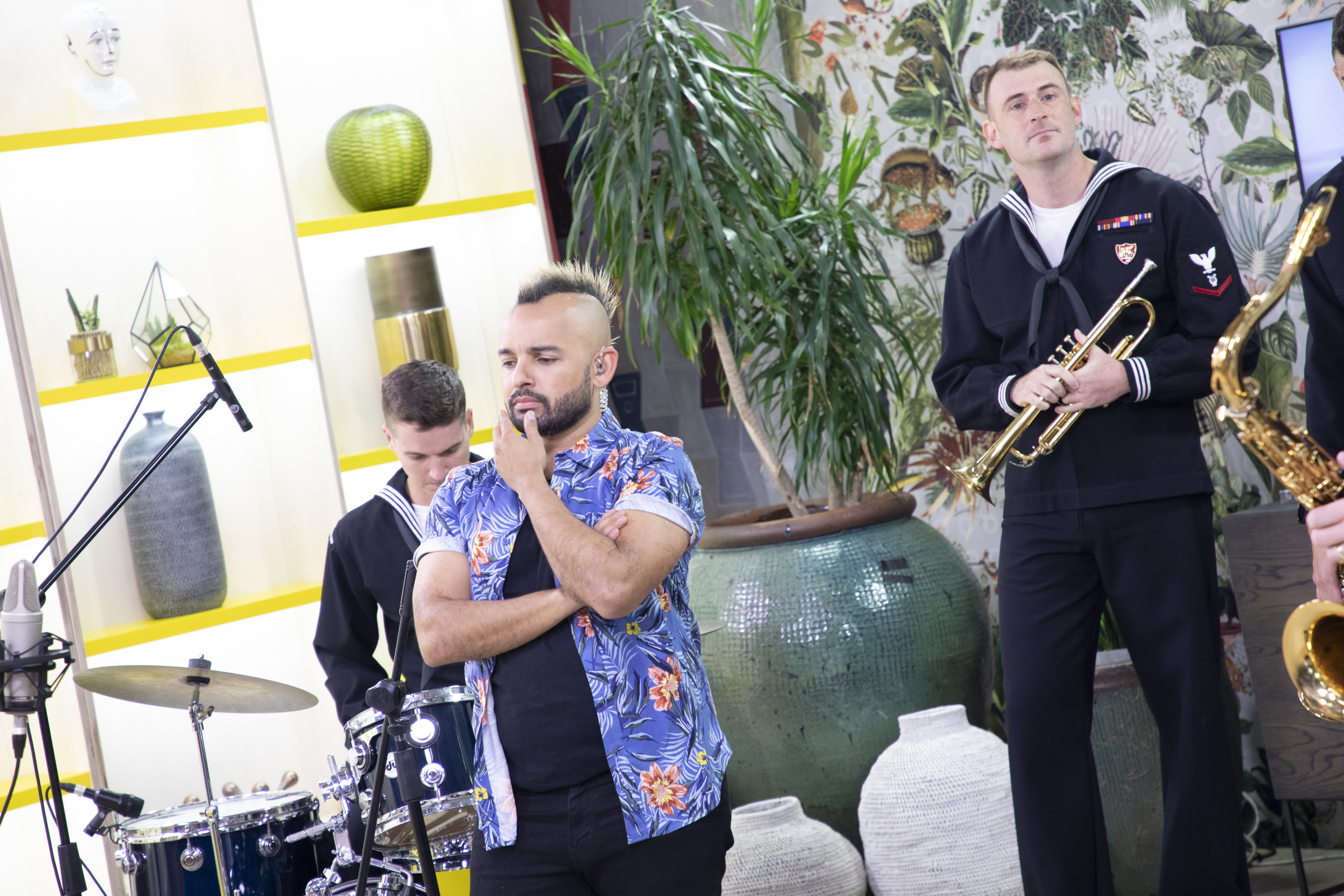
Carl Wastie on Expresso

== Listenership figures ==
Estimated Listenership BRC RAMS
Date	One-week cume
Jul '18 - Dec '18	869 000

== See also ==
- 947
- Primedia
- 702
- CapeTalk
