= Broadcasting Complaints Commission of South Africa =

Broadcasting complaints authority in South Africa

The Broadcasting Complaints Commission of South Africa (BCCSA) is a complaints authority established by the National Association of Broadcasters (NAB) to enforce a Code of Conduct for television and radio broadcasts in South Africa. The commission receives complaints from the public about offensive broadcasts and has the power to reprimand or fine broadcasters and to require the broadcast of a correction or apology. The BCCSA is independent of the NAB and of government, although it is funded by the NAB and recognised by ICASA as an independent disciplinary tribunal.

== See also ==
- Independent Communications Authority of South Africa
