= 947 (radio station) =

South African radio station

Coordinates: 26.102123°S 28.056134°E

- Johannesburg; South Africa
- Broadcast area: Gauteng
- Frequency: 94.7 MHz

Programming
- Format: Hot AC

Ownership
- Owner: Primedia
- Sister stations: 94.5 Kfm; Radio 702; CapeTalk

History
- First air date: September 1, 1964

Links
- Webcast: Live stream

947 (formerly 94.7 Highveld Stereo) is a radio station that broadcasts on the 94.7FM frequency from Johannesburg, Gauteng, South Africa.

== Current on-air lineup ==
Weekly Lineup
Show	Presenters	Days	Times
947 Daybreak	Nick Explicit	Mon- Fri	5am - 6am
Anele and The Club on 947	Anele Mdoda; Frankie Du Toit; Thembekile Mrototo; Cindy Poluta	Mon - Fri	6am - 9am
MoFlava on 947	MoFlava	Mon - Fri	9am - 12pm
947 Afternoons with Zweli	Zweli Mbhele; Noluthando Ngeno	Mon - Fri	12pm - 3pm
947Drive with Thando	Thando Thabethe; Msizi James (Co-host); Noluthando Ngeno (News Anchor)	Mon - Fri	3pm - 6pm
Marawa Sports Worldwide	Robert Marawa	Mon- Fri	6pm - 7pm
947 Night Pulse with Msizi & Bolele	Msizi James Bolele Polisa	Mon - Thurs	7pm - 9pm
947Mornings with Mantsoe	Mantsoe Pout	Saturdays & Sundays	7am - 10am
947 Top40	Nick Explicit	Saturday	10am - 2pm
947 Weekends with Mamohau	Mamohau Seseane	Saturdays & Sundays	2pm - 6pm
947Bloc Party	ChrisBeatz	Saturday & Friday	7pm - 10pm
947Weekender	Bolele Polisa	Sunday	6pm - 9pm

== History ==
The station first went on the air on 1 September 1964, as the first SABC regional FM service, Radio Highveld. At that time the station broadcast hourly news bulletins and easy listening music. In September 1996 the SABC sold Radio Highveld to private enterprise.

Today this station, along with a number of other radio stations in South Africa, is owned by Primedia.

On 1 September 2014 the station decided to drop the logo that they have been using for over a decade. The station is also no longer known as Highveld Stereo as the name changed to being just 947.

According to the latest BRC RAM figures shows that 947 has crossed the milestone of 1 million listeners per week. The survey indicated that 947 has 1,055,000 listeners, up from 704,000 year-on-year – a huge leap and one that makes 947 the biggest regional station in Gauteng.

== Format and programming ==
According to SAARF, 947 (formerly 94.7 Highveld Stereo) is ranked as South Africa's 15th most listened to radio station, with an average weekly listenership of 1.2 million people.

The target listener demographic is aimed at 25- to 40-year-olds, and as such the station tends to play contemporary "soft" rock, and current pop hits, but has moved away from playing the classic hits, which was consistent with their format up until a programming overhaul in 2010.

947 plays South African Music that record companies push, although the station has refused on many occasions to play any Afrikaans music. Other services to listeners include news bulletins and traffic reports for Johannesburg and Pretoria, although the frequency of these reports have often been criticised by listeners as being too frequent and annoying.

== Breakfast show history ==
=== Rude Awakening ===
Once Radio Highveld was sold by the SABC, the "Rude Awakening" took over from the Mike Mills Show as the station's breakfast show. The show ran from 1997 to 2010 and featured Jeremy Mansfield as the anchor host, supported by (among others) Sam Cowan, Paul Rotherham, Graeme Joffe, Harry Sideroppolis, and Darren Simpson. In July 2010 Mansfield was stated that "The show needs to move forward and I don't see a role for myself in the new product offering. Management and the board have asked if I would assist with off air initiatives, which I am happy to do for the foreseeable future." The format of the new breakfast show remained largely unchanged with the rest of the original team remaining as is.

=== Breakfast Xpress ===
On 2 August 2010, the station revamped the morning show by renaming it Breakfast Xpress and appointing Darren Simpson as the new front-man in place of Jeremy Mansfield. The show has been criticised for its childish nature, unprofessionalism, and poor production. The show became infamous for Whackhead's pranks which aired daily on the show. In 2017, Simpson announced that he would be leaving the breakfast show in order to spend more time with his family, but that he would nonetheless still host the station's drive-time show. This left listeners feeling confused and betrayed when they discovered that Simpson was to be the new host of sister station KFM's Breakfast Show and stepping away from the afternoon drive show on 947.

=== 947 Breakfast Club ===
On 2 March 2017, it was announced that Anele Mdoda would take over hosting the Breakfast Show starting 3 April 2017, alongside her existing team members—Alex Caige, Thembekile Mrototo, and Cindy Poluta—and a new addition to the lineup, Frankie du Toit.

=== Anele and the Club ===
In November 2020, 947 announced that its morning drive show has rebranded to Anele and the Club on 947. The station has also announced that the programme's new pay-off line is 'Joburg's Most Fun Breakfast Show'.

== Other presenters ==
=== Sam Cowen ===
Sam Cowen was co-host of the morning show The Breakfast express weekdays on 947. After leaving the breakfast Express, she took over the afternoon slot on 702. After a short stint as host of the afternoon show, she was replaced by Azania. She left radio. Cowen co-authored, with Lee van Loggerenberg, The Irreverent Mother's Handbook (Cape Town: Oshun Books, 2009, ISBN 978-1-77020-085-2).

In 2014, Cowen completed the 7.5 kilometre swim to Robben Island in what was the coldest recorded water temperature ever for this route for first time swimmers.

== Legal actions ==
=== Zuma vs. Highveld ===
In response to Darren Simpson's parody of South African Deputy President Jacob Zuma's ongoing rape trial of 2006—for which Zuma was acquitted—Zuma filed a defamation lawsuit on 30 June 2006, for the sum of R 5 million. Zuma originally filed for R 2 million, but this was upped when Highveld Stereo re-broadcast the allegedly offensive skit. Mr Zuma eventually withdrew the defamation claims against 947 and various other parties.

=== 702 and 94.7 vs. Forum of Black Journalists ===
In early 2008 Highveld together with their sister station Radio 702 submitted a complaint to the South African Human Rights Commission after the Forum of Black Journalists refused white journalists entry to a lunch with ANC President Jacob Zuma.

== Broadcast time ==
- 24/7

== Listenership figures ==
Estimated Listenership
	7 Day	Ave. Mon-Fri
Feb 2013	1 380 000	708 000
Dec 2012	1 354 000	679 000
Oct 2012	1 421 000	717 000
Aug 2012	1 522 000	776 000
Jun 2012	1 450 000	736 000

== See also ==
- Primedia
- 94.7 Cycle Challenge
- Jacob Zuma
- Independent Communications Authority of South Africa
- Broadcasting Complaints Commission of South Africa
