= List of campus radio stations =

This is a list of Student radio stations operated by the students of a college, university or other educational institution. In the United States these radio stations are called College radio stations, sometimes Campus radio and in the United Kingdom they are called student radio stations. This list is organized by country. For each station, a link to the associated college or university appears.

== Australia ==
- Adelaide – Radio Adelaide, University of Adelaide
- Armidale – TUNE! FM, University of New England
- Bathurst – 2MCE, Charles Sturt University
- Canberra – UCFM, University of Canberra
- Darwin – 104.1 Territory FM, Charles Darwin University
- Melbourne – SYN FM, RMIT University
- Newcastle – 2NUR, University of Newcastle
- Perth – Curtin FM, Curtin University
- Sydney – 2SER, Macquarie University and University of Technology, Sydney
- Sydney – SURG, Sydney University Radio Group
- Wodonga – Wodonga TAFE Radio, Wodonga Institute Of TAFE

== Canada ==
See List of campus radio stations in Canada.

== Croatia ==
- Radio Student – Faculty of Political Sciences, University of Zagreb

== Denmark ==
- XFM – Technical University of Denmark

== Germany ==
- Bochum – CT das Radio
- Bonn – BonnFM, Rheinische Friedrich-Wilhelms-Universität Bonn, Hochschule Bonn-Rhein-Sieg
- Duisburg & Essen – CampusFM, Universität Duisburg-Essen
- Jena - Campusradio Jena
- Köln – Kölncampus
- Paderborn – L'UniCo 89,4, Universität Paderborn
- Bielefeld – Hertz 87.9, Bielefeld University
- Chemnitz – Radio UNiCC, Technische Universität Chemnitz#Radio
- Leipzig – Mephisto 97.6, Universität Leipzig
- Stuttgart – Horads 88,6

== Ireland ==
- UCC 98.3FM
- Flirt FM
- Wired FM
- Belfield FM
- Queen's Radio

== Italy ==
List of RadUni broadcasters
| Radio | Promoting body | Location |
|---|---|---|
| Radio Frequenza Libera | Politecnico di Bari | Bari |
| RadioUniba | Università degli Studi di Bari Aldo Moro | Bari |
| Unica Radio | Università degli Studi di Cagliari | Cagliari |
| Radio Zammù | Università degli Studi di Catania | Catania |
| UMG Web Radio | Università degli Studi Magna Græcia | Catanzaro |
| UniRadio Cesena | Università di Bologna | Cesena |
| UniVersoMe | Università degli Studi di Messina | Messina |
| Master "Fare Radio" | Università Cattolica del Sacro Cuore | Milano |
| Plus Radio | Camplus Turro | Milano |
| Radio Bicocca | Università degli Studi di Milano-Bicocca | Milano |
| Radio IULM | Università IULM | Milano |
| F2 Radio Lab | Università degli Studi di Napoli Federico II | Napoli |
| Radio Bue | Università degli Studi di Padova | Padova |
| Radio Revolution | Università degli Studi di Parma | Parma |
| Ucampus | Università degli Studi di Pavia | Pavia |
| Radiophonica | Associazione culturale l'Officina | Perugia |
| RadioEco | Università di Pisa | Pisa |
| Radio Spin | Polo universitario "Città di Prato" | Prato |
| RumoreWeb | Università degli Studi di Modena e Reggio Emilia | Reggio Emilia |
| Radio ESN Italia | Erasmus Student Network Italia | Roma |
| Radio Sapienza | Università degli Studi di Roma "La Sapienza" | Roma |
| Roma Tre Radio | Università degli Studi Roma Tre | Roma |
| De Sanctis Web Radio | Liceo "Francesco De Sanctis" | Salerno |
| Radio UniSS | Università degli Studi di Sassari | Sassari |
| Campuswave | Università degli Studi di Genova | Savona |
| URadio | Università degli Studi di Siena | Siena |
| Radio Frequenza | Fondazione Università degli Studi di Teramo | Teramo |
| SanbaRadio | Università degli Studi di Trento | Trento |
| RadioInCorso | Università degli Studi di Trieste | Trieste |
| Cube Radio | Istituto Universitario Salesiano Venezia | Venezia |
| Radio Ca' Foscari | Università Ca' Foscari Venezia | Venezia |
| Radio 6023 | Università degli Studi del Piemonte Orientale | Vercelli e Novara |
| Fuori Aula Network | Università degli Studi di Verona | Verona |
| Radio Unitus | Università degli Studi della Tuscia | Viterbo |

== Lithuania ==
- Kaunas – KTU radio Gaudeamus, Kaunas University of Technology

== New Zealand ==
- Auckland – 95BFM, University of Auckland
- Christchurch – RDU, University of Canterbury
- Dunedin – Radio One, University of Otago
- Palmerston North – Radio Control 99.4FM, Massey University

== Philippines ==
- DZLB, University of the Philippines Los Baños
- DZUP, University of the Philippines Diliman
- UST Tiger Radio, University of Santo Tomas

== Portugal ==
- Coimbra – Rádio Universidade de Coimbra

== South Africa ==
- Cape Town – UCT Radio, University of Cape Town
- Grahamstown – Rhodes Music Radio, Rhodes University
- Johannesburg – UJFM Campus Radio, University of Johannesburg
- Johannesburg – Vow FM, University of the Witwatersrand
- Pretoria – Tuks FM, University of Pretoria
- Stellenbosch – MFM 92.6, Stellenbosch University
- Pretoria – Tshwane FM, Tshwane University of Technology

== Sweden ==
- Radio AF – Lund University

== Switzerland ==
- Lausanne – Fréquence Banane, EPFL

== Turkey ==
- Istanbul – Radio ITU, Istanbul Technical University
- Ankara – RadioTEDU, TED University

== United Arab Emirates ==
- Dubai – Campus Radio ME, Dubai

== United Kingdom ==
- Bangor – Storm FM, University of Wales, Bangor
- Bath – University Radio Bath, University of Bath
- Bedfordshire – Radio LaB, University of Bedfordshire
- Birmingham

Burn FM, University of Birmingham
Scratch Radio, Birmingham City University

- Bradford – RamAir, Bradford University
- Bristol – BURST, University of Bristol

Hub Radio, University of the West of England

- Bournemouth – Nerve Radio, Bournemouth University
- Cambridge – Cam FM 97.2, University of Cambridge
- Canterbury – CSR, University of Kent/Canterbury Christ Church University
- Cape Cornwall – Cape Radio, Cape Cornwall School
- Cardiff – Xpress Radio, Cardiff University
- Coventry – Radio Warwick, University of Warwick
- Coventry – Source Radio, Coventry University
- Derby – d:one, University of Derby
- Durham – Purple Radio, Durham University
- Edinburgh – Fresh Air (Edinburgh), University of Edinburgh
- Egham; London – Insanity Radio, Royal Holloway, University of London
- Exeter – Xpression FM, University of Exeter
- Glasgow – Radio Caley (Glasgow Caledonian University)
- Gloucestershire – Tone Radio, University of Gloucestershire
- Guildford – GU2 Radio, University of Surrey
- Hertfordshire – Crush Radio, University of Hertfordshire
- Keele – Kube Radio, Keele University
- Hull – Jam 1575, University of Hull
- Lancaster – Bailrigg FM, Lancaster University
- Leeds – LSRfm, University of Leeds
- Leicester – Demon FM, De Montfort University
- Liverpool

Looprevil Radio, Liverpool John Moores University
LSRadio, University of Liverpool

- London

Blast Radio, University of West London
IC Radio, Imperial College London
PuLSE Radio, London School of Economics
Rare FM, University College London
Smoke Radio, University of Westminster

- Loughborough – LCR, Loughborough University
- Manchester – Fuse FM, University of Manchester
- Nottingham – University Radio Nottingham, University of Nottingham
- Norwich – Livewire, University of East Anglia
- Portsmouth – Pure FM, University of Portsmouth
- Sheffield – Forge Radio, University of Sheffield
- Stoke On Trent – Heatwave Radio, Stoke On Trent College

Kube Radio, Keele University

- Southampton

Surge, University of Southampton
Radio Sonar, Southampton Solent University

- St Andrews – STAR: St Andrews Radio, University of St Andrews
- Stirling – Air3 – University of Stirling
- University of Hertfordshire – Crush Radio
- Winchester – 7Radio, Peter Symonds College
- York – University Radio York, University of York
