= Campus radio =

Type of radio station run by students

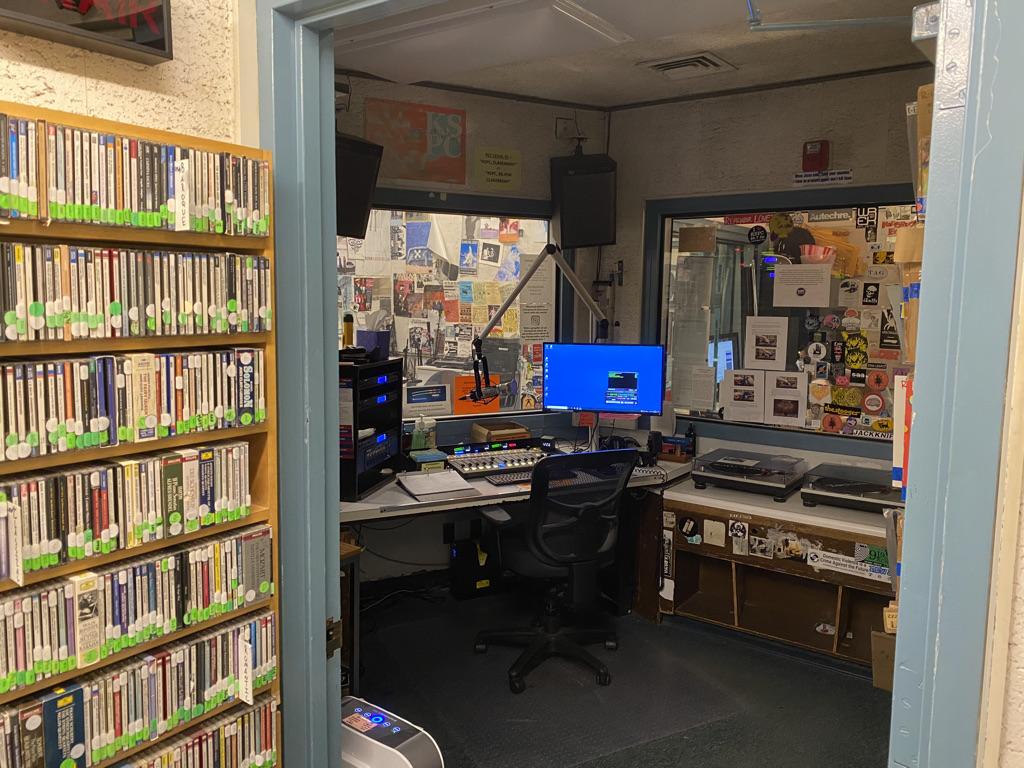
Recording booth at KSPC, a college radio station in Claremont, California

Campus radio (also known as college radio, university radio or student radio) is a type of radio station that is run by the students of a college, university or other educational institution. Programming may be exclusively created or produced by students, or may include program contributions from the local community in which the radio station is based. Sometimes campus radio stations are operated for the purpose of training professional radio personnel, sometimes with the aim of broadcasting educational programming, while other radio stations exist to provide alternative to commercial broadcasting or government broadcasters.

Campus radio stations are generally licensed and regulated by national governments, and have very different characteristics from one country to the next. One commonality between many radio stations regardless of their physical location is a willingness—or, in some countries, even a licensing requirement—to broadcast musical selections that are not categorized as commercial hits. Because of this, campus radio has come to be associated with emerging musical trends, including genres such as punk rock and new wave, alternative rock, indie rock, underground metal and hip-hop, long before those genres become part of the musical mainstream. Campus radio stations also often provide airplay and promotional exposure to new and emerging local artists.

Many campus radio stations carry a variety of programming including news (often local), sports (often relating to the campus), and spoken word programming as well as general music. Often the radio format is best described as a freeform, with much creativity and individualism among the disc jockeys and show hosts. Some of these radio stations have gained critical acclaim for their programming and are considered by the community in which they are embedded to be an essential media outlet.

== Transmission ==
While the term campus radio implies full-power AM or FM transmission, a significant number of stations transmit with low-power broadcasting, closed circuit, and carrier current systems, in some cases to on-campus listeners only. Many universities and college stations today also broadcast via the internet, either as an additional outlet for their licensed stations or in lieu of obtaining a government-issued license. In addition, college programming is distributed through local cable television systems on cable FM or on the second audio programs of TV radio stations.

== Campus radio around the world ==
=== Argentina ===
The first (and one of the most popular) campus radio in Argentina's history is LR11 Radio Universidad Nacional de La Plata, which belongs to the Universidad Nacional de La Plata. It was inaugurated on 5 April 1924 as an element of scientific dissemination and university extension, and it is the first university radio station in the world.

The most famous campus/college radio in the country, FM Radio Universidad ("University Radio"), is an Argentine radio station based in the city of Rosario, belonging to the National University of Rosario (UNR). It was created in 1994, and it has a strong focus on programs covering national/international news and current political topics of discussion, as well as AOR musical segments. The station transmits on 103.3 MHz.

=== Australia ===
Student radio stations generally operate under a community broadcasting licence. Some services, such as UCFM in Canberra, operate under a narrowcast license, while others broadcast exclusively online.

- Adelaide – Radio Adelaide, University of Adelaide
- Armidale – TUNE! FM, University of New England
- Batchelor – Radio Rum Jungle, Batchelor Institute of Indigenous Tertiary Education
- Bathurst – 2MCE, Charles Sturt University
- Canberra – UCFM, University of Canberra
- Darwin – 104.1 Territory FM, Charles Darwin University
- Launceston – LCFM, Launceston College
- Melbourne – 3SSR, Swinburne University of Technology
- Melbourne – SYN, RMIT University
- Melbourne – Radio Fodder, University of Melbourne
- Newcastle – 2NUR, University of Newcastle
- Perth – Curtin Radio, Curtin University
- Sydney – 2SER, Macquarie University and University of Technology, Sydney
- Sydney – SURG, Sydney University Radio Group
- Sydney – Sydney TAFE Radio, Sydney Institute of TAFE
- Wodonga – Wodonga TAFE Radio, Wodonga Institute Of TAFE

Australia also once had two radio stations that were operated by universities and dedicated to delivery of course content:

- Sydney – VL2UV, University of New South Wales (commenced in 1961, using 1750 kHz, just outside the AM broadcast band, closed in 1986.) It also broadcast on the same frequency in Wollongong (from 1963) and Newcastle (from 1965).
- Adelaide – VL5UV, University of Adelaide (commenced in 1972, but later that year converted to a community radio station, became Radio Adelaide.)

=== Austria ===
- Radio Radieschen 91.3 - a campus radio station running a 24/7 program by students of FHWien.
- Radio Campus - a campus radio station run by students of the University of Vienna.

=== Bangladesh ===
BU RADiO is the first campus radio station of the University of Barishal in Barishal, Bangladesh. It was founded on 19 May 2019 by a group of students and alumni of the university.

BUET Radio is the first campus radio in Bangladesh among the engineering universities. It was established on 30 October 2015 and is run by the students of the institution.

BRUR Campus Radio is the Campus Online Radio of Begum Rokeya University, Rangpur.

KUET RADIO is a university-based radio station in Khulna University of Engineering & Technology, established in 2016. This station broadcasts campus-based programs and public notices of the administration.

SUSTcast is the campus radio station made for Shahjalal University of Science and Technology. It is the first-ever AI-based online campus radio among universities in Bangladesh. SUSTcast, a joint project of RoboSUST, Dept. of CSE, and Team Meow is open for all the students and teachers of Shahjalal University of Science and Technology. Different organizations and teacher-students from the university can perform on this platform regularly.

UAPIANS RADIO is an online-based Radio which is organized by the Students of the University of Asia Pacific.

=== Belgium ===
- Urgent.fm (Ghent University)
- Radio Campus (Université Libre de Bruxelles)
- XL AIR (VUB & EhB)

=== Brazil ===
In Brazil, most campus radios operate under an educational radio license, granted by the Ministry of Communications and the National Telecommunications Agency. In Brazil, educational radios are prohibited from broadcast commercial advertising on its programming, except in the form of cultural support. According to the Brazilian Association of Radio and Television Broadcasters (ABERT), in April 2013, Brazil had 466 educational radios.

- USP FM – 93.7 MHz – São Paulo – University of São Paulo
- UNESP FM – 105.7 MHz – Bauru – São Paulo State University
- FM Unitau – 107.7 MHz – Taubaté – University of Taubaté
- Universitária FM – 104.7 MHz – Vitória – Federal University of Espírito Santo
- Udesc FM – 100.1 MHz – Florianópolis – Santa Catarina State University
- Universitária FM – 107.9 MHz – Fortaleza – Federal University of Ceará
- Rádio da Universidade AM – 1080 kHz – Porto Alegre – Federal University of Rio Grande do Sul
- Mix FM – 107.1 MHz – Canoas – Lutheran University of Brazil
- UPF FM – 99.9 MHz – Passo Fundo – University of Passo Fundo
- UCS FM - 106.5 MHz – Caxias do Sul – University of Caxias do Sul
- Univates FM – 95.1 MHz – Lajeado – University of Taquari Valley
- Uni FM – 107.9 MHz – Santa Maria – Federal University of Santa Maria
- Federal FM – 107.9 MHz – Pelotas – Federal University of Pelotas
- URI FM – 106.1 MHz – Santiago – Integrated Regional University of Upper Uruguay and Missões
- Universitária FM – 99.9 MHz – Recife – Federal University of Pernambuco
- Universitária FM – 95.9 MHz – Boa Vista – Federal University of Roraima
- Universitária AM – 870 kHz – Goiânia – Federal University of Goiás

=== Brunei Darussalam ===
UBD FM is the first university-based radio station in Brunei Darussalam. The student-run organization operates under the Educational and Technology Center of the Universiti Brunei Darussalam and was established in 2008.

=== Canada ===
In Canada, radio stations are regulated by the Canadian Radio-television and Telecommunications Commission (CRTC), which provides that "a campus radio station is a radio station owned or controlled by a not-for-profit organization associated with a post-secondary educational institution". The CRTC distinguishes two types of campus radio: instructional (for training of professional broadcasters) and community-based campus (programming provided by volunteers who are not training to be professionals). The community-based radio format is the predominant one, colloquially known as "campus-community radio." In recent years, some community-based campus radio stations, including CFFF-FM in Peterborough and CJMQ-FM in Sherbrooke, have in fact had their CRTC licenses formally reclassified from campus radio to community radio.

Campus radio stations broadcasting at full power are assigned a permanent frequency and call letters and, aside from a requirement not to compete directly with commercial radio stations, are full players in the Canadian broadcasting spectrum. Campus radio stations in Canada are more commonly associated with universities than with colleges, although some colleges also have licensed campus radio stations. As well, some institutions maintain unlicensed campus radio operations which broadcast only by closed circuit, cable FM or Internet streaming. Also see United States section for more general information.

Canada's oldest community-based campus radio station is CFRC at Queen's University in Kingston, which has been on the air since 1923; it began as a commercial radio station and a Canadian Broadcasting Corporation affiliate but became the country's first university-owned station in 1942 and fully transitioned to a campus radio station in 1957. CJRT-FM, a campus radio station of the instructional type, has been on air since 1949.

The CRTC places responsibilities upon campus radio stations in Canada through the use of conditions of license that radio stations must follow in order to keep broadcasting. Campus radio stations, for example, are expected to be leaders in the Canadian content system which mandates a minimum number of Canadian musical selections throughout the day. The minimum Canadian content required for a campus station is 35%. Individual programs have their own requirements which depend on a particular program's content category. Generally, for popular music programs (pop, rock, dance, country-oriented, acoustic, and easy listening), hosts must play a minimum of 35% Canadian content. Programs featuring Special Interest Music (concert, folk-oriented, world, blues, jazz, non-classic religious, and experimental) must have at least 12% Canadian content. In early 2005, Humber College's radio station CKHC-FM became the first broadcast radio station in Canada to air 100% Canadian content. Other requirements generally made of campus radio stations include quotas of non-hit, folk, and ethnic musical selections as well as spoken word programming.

Most campus radio stations in Canada are members of the National Campus and Community Radio Association.

On 23 January 2012, the CRTC announced it would be eliminating instructional radio stations.

=== Colombia ===
There are 72 university radio stations in Colombia, which belong to 55 universities. They are associated in the University Radio Network of Colombia, RRUC, a goodwill association, created on September 19, 2003, in Bucaramanga, within the framework of the First National Meeting of Citizen and University Radio convened by the Ministries of Education, Culture and Communications.

By mode of transmission, there are 9 stations in AM, 38 in FM and 25 on line. The 55 universities are geographically located in 20 capital cities and 11 municipalities in Colombia.

=== Denmark ===
There are five student radio stations in Denmark related to the largest universities in Denmark. Only the town of Roskilde has a university and no permanent radio, but every year the five existing student radio stations work together in producing 10 days of radio on the Roskilde festival. The project is a cooperation between all the student radios organized by the cooperation organization called DDS and could be considered a temporary radio station.

The five student radio stations in Denmark are listed below with the city they relate to in Denmark.

- Universitetsradioen in Copenhagen
- XFM Lyngby in Lyngby
- Odense studenterradio in Odense
- Arhus studenterradio in Århus
- Aalborg studenterradio in Aalborg

All the radios broadcast radio in local frequencies on FM in their related city. XFM actually has two departments one in Copenhagen and one in Lyngby and is the only radio who has two broadcast licenses.

The only one of the radio stations which broadcasts radio directly on campus is Aalborg student radio. As many of the American student radio Aalborg has speaker directly on the university where they can broadcast radio to the students cad Campus Rdio AAU.

=== France ===
Radio Campus France is a national, non-profit radio broadcasting network grouping 22 public college radio stations located in the largest French cities. Acting as an umbrellas for college radio in French public Universities, it proves that there is strength in numbers, and that music, technology and education are natural bedfellows. Not just a collection of disparate elements, Radio Campus is a vocal leader in the areas of digital broadcasting, keeping tabs on the development of terrestrial radio, as well as developing new network interfaces for radio stations across the nation to share content. With a broad music program, the playlist is powered by the passion of fans, and heralds a modern way for groups to interact in the social web. Whether through their support of regular residency shows from the likes of Beats In Space, or Warp Records, or broadcasting live from Gilles Peterson's Worldwide Festival in Sete, it is the love of the music which connects the listeners, and that makes Radio Campus a unique and special group indeed.

The Radio Campus France radio stations include:

- Amiens – Radio Campus Amiens 88.7
- Angers – Radio Campus Angers 103.0
- Besançon – Radio Campus Besançon 102.4
- Bordeaux – Radio Campus Bordeaux 88.1
- Brest – Radio-U 101.1
- Caen – Radio Phénix 92.7
- Clermont-Ferrand – Radio Campus Clermont-Ferrand 93.3
- Dijon – Radio Dijon Campus 92.2
- Grenoble – Radio Campus Grenoble 90.8
- Lille – Radio Campus Lille 106.6
- Lyon – Radio Brume 90.7
- Marseille – Radio Grenouille 88.8
- Montpellier – Radio Campus Montpellier 102.2
- Orléans – Radio Campus Orléans 88.3
- Paris – Radio Campus Paris 93.9
- Rennes – Radio Campus Rennes 88.4
- Strasbourg – Radio En Construction 90.7
- Toulouse – Radio Campus Toulouse 94.0
- Tours – Radio Campus Tours 99.5

The Confédération des radios de grandes écoles is the national non-profit network unifying 46 internet radios in the Grandes Ecoles, higher education establishments outside the main framework of the French university system, specialised schools spread in more than twenty cities: schools of business, engineering or political science for example. The CRGE represents more than 150 000 students and do reports in the main French international events like the Cannes Films Festival, the Monaco Grand Prix or the Paris Games Week. They have interviewed many CEOs like Xavier Niel, CEO of Free, or politicians, like the new French President François Hollande. They also have links with other campus radios and campus radios network in the world.

The CRGE members are for the Business Schools:

- Audencia – FM'Air
- Grenoble School of Management – Micro-Ondes
- Rouen Business School – Rou'On Air
- Reims Management School – On AirMS
- Euromed Management – Dynam'hit
- IESEG School of Management – NePap Radio
- Toulouse Business School – CulturESC
- ESC Rennes School of Business – Descibel
- EM Strasbourg Business School – EM Radio
- Burgundy School of Business – Dij'ital
- Iscool – Iscool
- EDHEC – On Air
- HEC – Hechoes – FMR
- ISC – Voice
- ESG – ESGMS Media
- INSEEC – Inseec'Ond
- ESC Clermont Business School – Radio'Actif
- EDC Paris Business School – Radio Ooh
- École de management de Normandie – L'Havrai Radio
- Bordeaux École de Management – Start hit
- Emlyon Business School – Propulsound Radio
- ESC Troyes – Radio Trente Troyes Tours

The CRGE Engineering Schools radios includes:

- Ponts et Chaussées – uPonts the air
- HEI – GB Radio
- INSA Toulouse – Radio Insa
- EPITA – Air Radio
- EFREI – Ready'O
- École centrale d'électronique – No Larsen
- ENSEA – Fuse
- École Centrale de Nantes – Nuclérez
- École polytechnique – X-Ray
- École centrale Paris – Radio Pi
- INSA Lyon – Gatsun
- INSA Rennes – Le Mégaphone
- Sup Info – Sup Radio
- ESTP – Radio ESTP
- ENSTA – Bruitage

The other member Grandes Ecoles radios are:

- Sciences Po – Radio Sciences Po
- ENS Lyon – TrENSistor
- École nationale supérieure d'architecture de Nancy – Radar
- ÉNS Cachan – WebRadio Cachanaise
- École normale supérieure (rue d'Ulm — Paris) – TrENSmission
- Université Paris-1 Panthéon-Sorbonne – Sorb'On Air
- Dauphine – Dauphine On Air
- Sciences Po Bordeaux – Radio Lado
- Sciences Po Aix – Sciences Po Hertz

=== Germany ===
- South Westfalia University of Applied Sciences, Meschede – radioFH! 94,7 MHz

=== Greece ===
PolyteXneio FM is the National Technical University of Athens Students' Radio Station. It is an open student project; its character is strictly non-profit and participation is free for any student of the NTUA.

=== Guatemala ===
- Radio Universidad

=== Hungary ===
- Pécsi Egyetemi Rádió – University Radio Pécs
- Első Pesti Egyetemi Rádió – ELTE, Budapest

=== Iceland ===
- Seyðisfjörður Community Radio is an experimental radio station run from the art school LungA School, Seyðisfjörður.

=== India ===
Community groups in India, and non-governmental organisations (NGOs) have been campaigning for permission to set up community radio (CR) radio stations since the late 1990s.

News, as of November 2006, has it that the India cabinet decided to grant permission to non-profit organizations and educational institutions to set up community radio stations. The cabinet decision will allow civil society and voluntary organizations, state agriculture universities and institutions, Krishi Vigyan Kendras or agricultural science centers, registered societies and autonomous boards, and public trusts registered under Societies Act to start community radio stations. Broadcast Engineering Consultants of India is a government-owned corporation that helps setup of Community FM radio stations in India.

Ravi Shankar Prasad, the then Minister for Information and Broadcasting in the government, told India's upper house of parliament the Rajya Sabha on 22 December 2003, that four organizations including Jammu University and Kashmir University were found ineligible for grant of license as per the laid down guidelines. The minister also ruled out any review of the policy despite limited response to the non-commercial, low-powered FM radio scheme which former information and broadcasting minister Sushma Swaraj had said would "revolutionize" radio broadcast in the country.

Radio enthusiast Alokesh Gupta saying: "The announcement of the Government was to have seen 1000 radio stations by December 2003. Instead administrative wrangling came in the way of implementing the project as colleges spent time running around for licenses and approval from four ministries — Home Affairs, Communications & Information & Broadcasting — as they took their time processing applications."

On 2 February 2004, Anna University in Chennai unveiled the country's first campus radio station, Anna FM. Radio Ujjas in Kutch (in the western state of Gujarat) is one such CR and gets its funding from the United Nations Development Programme (UNDP) and the Central Government. Similarly, a community-based radio programme titled Panchayat Vani (People's Voice) was recently broadcast on All India Radio (AIR), Darbhanga, Bihar. The campus radio station Gyanvaani has also been licensed.

Sam Higginbottom University of Agriculture, Technology and Sciences established a community radio station, Radio Adan (90.4 MHz) in 2008, which brings together experts, students, farmers, and local population, through various popular programmes, focussing on agriculture, education, employment, women empowerment, child marriage, health and culture.

Pune University is the first university in the state of Maharashtra to have an FM radio station. The University of Pune's FM Radio inaugurated on 1 May 2005, has been named as Vidyavani. It covers a wide range of subjects, focusing specifically on the requirements of students of various departments and affiliated colleges. It reaches an area around the campus within eight-km radius.

Unsuccessful attempts have been also made to start CR without obtaining any permission. The small village of Orvakal in Kurnool district of Andhra Pradesh (South India) launched "Mana Radio" (Our Radio) in November 2002. This project run under the aegis of the Society for Elimination of Rural Poverty used a tiny transmitter that covered a radius of half a kilometer to enable rural women members of self-help groups. Four months later, officials from the Central Government brought in police to seize the equipment and declared the broadcasts illegal.

The Government policy to permit educational institutions to have their own FM Channels at low-frequency levels emerged in mid-December 2002, as a result of years of campaigning by activists and a strongly worded Supreme Court judgment directing the opening up of the airwaves.

A unique experiment in using media technologies, especially radio, for development and empowerment of marginalized, rural communities is the community radio initiative "Chalo Ho Gaon Mein" a programme that is broadcast once a week on AIR Daltonganj in the Palamu district of Jharkhand, eastern India. This radio programme is supported by the National Foundation for India and produced by Community representatives, of Alternative for India Development (AID), a non-governmental organization. School of Communication of Manipal also has its own campus radio.

Ravenshaw Radio 90.4 MHz is Odisha state's first campus community radio station (CRS) of Ravenshaw University in Cuttack, Odisha. It started broadcasting in April 2011.

According to the terms of the campus broad license, a number of aspects are disallowed from broadcasts. This includes anything that offends good taste or decency, contains criticism of friendly countries, contains an attack on religion, contains anything obscene, defamatory, false, and suggestive innuendos and half-truths, likely to encourage or incite violence, contains anything affecting the integrity of the nation, criticizes, maligns or slanders any individual in person, encourages superstition or blind belief, denigrates women, denigrates children, or presents or depicts or suggests as desirable the misuse of drugs, alcohol, narcotics, and tobacco.

=== Indonesia ===
Radio Syiar FM, Universitas Islam Negeri (UIN) Alauddin, Makassar, South Sulawesi, Indonesia.

Is a campus (student) community base radio broadcasting system, originally it has a function as an engineering laboratory to train students in broadcast engineering skills, which are currently being sought to turn into a radio commercial for the students also can improve their skills in terms of broadcast management and broadcast business

=== Ireland ===
Belfield FM, University College Dublin.

Belfield FM is University College Dublin's student radio station. The station began broadcasting in 1990. It was initially run as a part of the UCD Students' Union, under the remit of the entertainments office, before becoming an independent entity within the Students' Union. Belfield FM disaffiliated with the SU at the end of the 2011/2012 college year, and is now run independently within the UCD Societies Council framework. The station forms part of UCD's 'Student Media Network', along with The University Observer and The College Tribune. The station is run by volunteer staff and contributors, and broadcasts on week-days as well as hosting a coterie of Podcasts on their Mixcloud account. The station has won multiple accolades from the National Student Media Awards, and has an annual 24-hour charity broadcast that has raised funds in aid of organisations such as the Dublin Rape Crisis Centre and the Peter McVerry Trust.

=== Israel ===
Campus radio also exists in Israel, where several colleges, universities, and high schools have successful programs. One of the most famous is Kol HaCampus (Voice of the Campus/Campus Voice), broadcast out of Tel Aviv on 106 MHz. More information can be found with the Israeli Broadcasting Authority. Another college radio station is the Hebrew University's in Jerusalem, broadcasting mostly indie and alternative music. In 2011 the Technion has joined these universities with a new campus radio station, Radio 1m. In 2017 the students of Sede Boquer Campus of the Ben Gurion University established SB Campus Radio, which function as a podcast network.

=== Italy ===
- POLI.RADIO, the web radio operated by students of Politecnico di Milano
- Radio WAU, the web radio of University of Salento
- Radio 6023 (operated by University of Eastern Piedmont)
- radioeco.it, the web radio of the University of Pisa
- RadioBue.it, the web radio of the University of Padua
- radiobocconi.it, Università Commerciale Luigi Bocconi di Milano
- Radio Catt (operated by Università Cattolica del Sacro Cuore)
- FuoriAulaNetwork, Università degli Studi di Verona
- Sanbaradio.it, the web radio of the University of Trento
- UCampus, the web radio of the University of Pavia
- Unica Radio, the student's radio of University of Cagliari
- Radio Urca – Urbino Radio Campus
- Radiophonica.com, web radio and web TV

=== Malaysia ===
- Radio Monash (operated by Monash University Malaysia)
- Wings Radio (operated by Limkokwing University of Creative Technology)
- RMMU (operated by Multimedia University)
- IIUM FM (operated by International Islamic University Malaysia)
- UFM (operated by Universiti Teknologi MARA)
- Putra FM (operated by Universiti Putra Malaysia)
- iRadio OUM (operated by Open University Malaysia)
- UMS KKFM (operated by Universiti Malaysia Sabah)
- WINTI (operated by INTI International University & Colleges)
- MyUFM (operated by Universiti Teknologi MARA, Terengganu campus)
- KDU Campus Radio (operated by [UOW KDU MALAYSIA ], Utropolis Glenmarie Campus)

=== Mexico ===
- XEUN-FM, UNAM, Mexico City
- XEANAH-AM, Anahuac University, Huixquilucan, State of Mexico
- XHUDG-FM, UAG, Guadalajara, Jalisco
- XEUT-AM, UABC, Tijuana, Baja California

=== New Zealand ===
- Human FM, Victoria University of Wellington, Wellington
- MUNTfm, Massey University, Wellington
- Radio One, University of Otago, Dunedin
- RDU, University of Canterbury, Christchurch
- Radio Control, Massey University, Palmerston North
- Contact FM, University of Waikato, Hamilton
- 95bFM, University of Auckland, Auckland
- The VBC, Victoria University of Wellington, Wellington
- Static FM, AUT, Auckland

=== Nigeria ===
- Abuja – University of Abuja, Abuja
- Akwa Ibom – Akwa Ibom State Polytechnic, Ikot Osurua, UNIUYO100.7FM, University of Uyo, Uyo, HERITAGE104.9 FM (Heritage Polytechnic), Eket
- Anambra – UNIZIK94.1FM, Nnamdi Azikiwe University, Awka, MADONNA93.4FM, Madonna University (Ihiala), Okija
- Cross River – Cross River State University of Science and Technology, Ogoja
- Edo – HILLSIDE94.1FM, Auchi Polytechnic, Auchi, Igbinedion University, Okada
- Enugu – GOU-UNI106.9fm, Godfrey Okoye University, Enugu, CARITAS98.7FM, Caritas University, Enugu, University of Nigeria, Nsukka
- Kaduna – Ahmadu Bello University (ABU), Zaria, Kaduna Polytechnic, Kaduna, National Teachers Institute, Kaduna
- Kano – Bayero University, Kano
- Kwara State – UNILORIN89.3FM, University of Ilorin, Ilorin
- Lagos – NOUN105.9FM, National Open University of Nigeria Victoria Island, UNILAG103.1FM, University of Lagos Akoka, Lagos State University, Ojo 95.7FM
- Niger – Search FM 92.3, Federal University of Technology Minna, Ultimate FM 103.9 Niger State College of Education Minna Minna
- Ogun – Babcock University, Ilesan-Remo, Hebron 95.9 FM, Covenant University, Canaanland
- Ondo – FUTA93.1FM, Federal University of Technology, Akure, AAU FM, Adekunle Ajasin University, Akungba, Ondo
- Osun – Obafemi Awolowo University, Ile-Ife
- Oyo – DIAMOND101.1FM, University of Ibadan, Ibadan, Crowther FM, Ajayi Crowther University, Oyo
- Plateau – University of Jos, Jos
- Rivers – Rivers State University of Science and Technology, Port Harcourt, University of Port Harcourt, Port Harcourt
- Sokoto – Usman Danfodio University, Sokoto
- kanem FM 97.7 University of Maiduguri

=== Norway ===
- Hurradio, Tromsø
- Radio Nova, Oslo
- Radio Revolt, Trondheim
- SmiS Radio, Stavanger
- Studentradioen i Bergen, Bergen
- Studentradioen i Kristiansand, Kristiansand
- Volda Studentradio, Volda
- Gjøvik Studentradio, Gjøvik
- Narvik Studentradio, Narvik
- Ventus Studentradio, Bodø

=== Pakistan ===
- SMIU FM 96.6 The Voice OF Education (Sindh Madressatul Islam University)
- Campus Voice Fm 106.6
- Radio Kinnaird 97.6 FM (Kinnaird College for Women, Lahore)
- Radio IBA (Institute of Business Administration Karachi)
- Karachi university campus radio FM 90.6 (University of Karachi)
- University of Gujrat Campus Radio UOG Community radio 106.6
- 24/7 An Educational Radio Network By SZABIST Karachi, larkana ZAB FM 106.6 "Education On Air"
- AIOU FM 91.6 The Voice OF AIOU (Allama Iqbal Open University, Islamabad)

=== Poland ===
- Radio Meteor (Adam Mickiewicz University in Poznań)
- Radio Afera (Poznań University of Technology)
- Radio Aktywne (Warsaw University of Technology)
- Students Radio Żak (Łódź University of Technology)
- Akademickie Radio LUZ (Wrocław University of Technology)
- Radio Akadera (Technical University of Białystok)
- Radio Index (University of Zielona Góra)
- Radio Kampus (University of Warsaw)
- Radio Sfera UMK (Nicolaus Copernicus University in Toruń)
- UJOT.FM (Jagiellonian University)

=== Portugal ===
In Portugal, there are several college and university radio stations continuously broadcasting programs. Rádio Universidade de Coimbra and Rádio Universidade Marão, founded in 1986, are the oldest university student radio stations in the country still in operation. There are also many online-only radio sites belonging to higher education institutions.

Portugal's major college and university radio stations include:

- Rádio Universidade de Coimbra (University of Coimbra)
- Rádio Universitária da Beira Interior (University of Beira Interior)
- Rádio Universitária do Algarve (University of the Algarve)
- Rádio Universitária do Minho (Minho University)
- Rádio Zero (Instituto Superior Técnico)
- Universidade FM (former Rádio Universidade Marão) (Trás-os-Montes and Alto-Douro University)

=== Puerto Rico ===
- WRTU, University of Puerto Rico, Río Piedras.

=== Romania ===
- Radio Campus Craiova, University of Craiova, Craiova.
- Radio Campus Transilvania, Transilvania University of Brașov, Brașov

=== Russia ===
- STUD FM, Moscow State Educational Complex, Moscow

=== Singapore ===
There is one student radio station for each of the three universities in Singapore, namely Singapore Management University, National University of Singapore and Nanyang Technological University. Some polytechnics have their own student radio stations, namely Singapore Polytechnic, Ngee Ann Polytechnic and Temasek Polytechnic.

- SMU Campus Radio, Singapore Management University
- SPACEradio, Singapore Polytechnic
- Radio Fusion, Nanyang Technological University Off-Air/closed down
- Radio Heatwave, Ngee Ann Polytechnic
- Radio Pulze, National University of Singapore
- RadioAct!ve, Temasek Polytechnic

=== Slovenia ===
Radio Študent – founded by University of Ljubljana

=== Sweden ===
Student radio has been broadcast in Sweden since the beginning of 1980. Among the first, and still active stations were Studentradion 98,9 in Uppsala and Radio AF in Lund. It is common among the older student radio stations to broadcast both on FM and the web.

Studentradion i Sverige is a cooperation organization for the student radio stations in Sweden, they have 13 member stations.

- DUR in Falun
- K103 in Gothenburg
- PiteFM in Piteå
- Radio AF in Lund
- Radio Campus in Örebro
- RadioLUR in Växjö
- Radio Shore in Kalmar
- Radiosvallet in Sundsvall
- SH Radio in Stockholm
- Stampus FM in Helsingborg
- Stockholm College Radio in Stockholm
- Studentradion 98,9 in Uppsala
- Umeå Studentradio in Umeå

=== South Africa ===
- VUT FM (Vaal University of Technology)
- Radio Turf (University of Limpopo)
- PUKfm (North-West University)
- UCT Radio (University of Cape Town)
- MFM (University of Stellenbosch)
- Voice of Wits (University of the Witwatersrand)
- KOVSIE FM (University of the Free State)
- TshwaneFm (Tshwane University of Technology)
- Tuks FM (University of Pretoria)
- UJFM (University of Johannesburg)
- Rhodes Music Radio (Rhodes University)
- Madibaz Radio (Nelson Mandela Metropolitan University)
- UNIFM (Cape Peninsula University of Technology)
- CUT FM (Central University of Technology)
- Radio DUT (Durban University of Technology)

=== Switzerland ===
Fréquence banane is the student radio of the University of Lausanne (UNIL) and the Swiss Federal Institute of Technology in Lausanne (EPFL), in Lausanne (Lausanne campus). It exists since 1993 and is broadcasting on the internet and CATV network on FM 94.55 MHz in Lausanne and region. In the past Fréquence banane has broadcast with former Radio Acidule from 1992 to 1996 and then had its independent FM transmitter operating on 92.4 MHz from 1998 to 2005. In 2005, Swiss frequency regulation authority (BAKOM) decided to end the low power FM licence.

Radio Radius is an uprising campus radio in Zürich on ETHZ and UNIZH campus. It's broadcasting on the Internet only. Radius is trying to get a permanent licence to broadcast on FM but it is very hard in Zurich. Right now Radius is negotiating with BAKOM.

=== Tunisia ===
Radio Campus Tunis is a non-profit Student radio station powered by Disk Red Association. Founded in 2014 and broadcasting on the Internet since 21 June 2016, the radio can be listened from 6.00 a.m. to 4.00 a.m on www.radiocampustunis.radiostream321.com . Managed by volunteers (mainly students), this radio focuses on emerging local music and student-related matters.

=== Turkey ===
- Radyo Boğaziçi on Boğaziçi University
- Radyo Bilkent on Bilkent University
- Radyo Çankaya on Çankaya University
- KU Radyo on Koç University
- RadyoSU on Sabancı University
- Radyo ODTÜ on Middle East Technical University
- ÇOMÜ Kampüs FM on Çanakkale Onsekiz Mart University
- Radyo ÖzÜ on Özyeğin University
- Radyo Arel on Istanbul Arel University
- Radyo SDÜ on Suleyman Demirel Universitesi

=== United Kingdom ===
In the United Kingdom, campus radio is generally referred to as 'student radio'.

Founded in 1960, the University of Hertfordshire's Campus Radio Hatfield (now Trident Media Radio) was the UK's first student radio station, though it was a pirate radio station. This was followed by the first legal station, Radio Heslington (now University Radio York) in 1967, Swansea University's Action Radio (now Xtreme Radio) in 1968, Stirling University's University Radio Airthrey (now Air3 Radio) from 1970, University of Essex's University Radio Essex in 1971, and Loughborough University's Loughborough Campus Radio in 1973.

Some student radio stations operate on the FM waveband for short periods at a time under a restricted service licence, while others choose to broadcast full-time on the AM waveband using an LPAM license. There are only five UK student radio stations permitted to broadcast all year on LPFM. These are Xpression FM (Exeter), Radio Roseland (Truro, Cornwall), Storm FM (Bangor), Bailrigg FM (Lancaster) and 1386 HCR (Halesowen College). None of these licenses provides for a reception area greater than four kilometres from the point of transmission. To counteract these license restrictions and, in the case of AM broadcasts, poor quality audio, many radio stations simulcast on the Internet.

The UK Student Radio Association works on behalf of more than fifty UK-based member radio stations to further their development, encourage and facilitate communication between member radio stations and links to the commercial radio industry, and lobby for the membership's interests on both a regional and national level. The association organises and hosts the annual Student Radio Awards in conjunction with BBC Radio 1.

=== United States ===
College radio (as it is generally known in the United States) became commonplace in the 1960s when the Federal Communications Commission (FCC) began issuing class D licenses for ten-watt radio stations to further the development of the then new FM band. Some colleges had already been broadcasting for decades on the AM band, often originating in physics experiments in the early 20th century.

One of the first college radio stations in the country is WRUC from Union College in Schenectady, New York. Its first experimental audio broadcasts under the call sign 2YU were in 1916. Regular programing for the public under call sign 2ADD began in 1920. WHUS, (the UConn HUSkies), the radio station of the University of Connecticut went on the air as WABL, a 100-watt AM radio station, in 1922 with two 103-foot (31 m) steel towers serving as the radio station's antennae. In 1925 power increased to 500-watts and the call letters changed to WCAC (Connecticut Agricultural College, at that time the name of the university). Rollins College in Winter Park, Florida started WDBO (Way Down By Orlando) in 1924. WDBO was given away by Rollins College in 1926. College radio returned to Rollins College when the FM radio station, WPRK began broadcasting on 10 December 1952.

Most of the FM radio stations received higher-class licenses than ten watts, typically a few hundred watts. A few got several kilowatts, and a small handful got licenses in the range of tens of thousands, sometimes reaching up to maximum-power 100-kilowatt outlets. WRAS 88.5 FM and WREK 91.1 FM in Atlanta are the most powerful college radio stations, operating at 100,000 watts. WDAV 89.9 FM in Davidson, North Carolina also operates at 100,000 watts, although the Davidson College administration now controls this station instead of students. Still, due to strict class D regulations, some radio stations were prohibited from a wattage upgrade for possible signal interference with adjacent radio stations, such as KWUR 90.3 FM interfering with KWMU 90.7 FM in St. Louis, Missouri. KTUH 90.3 FM in Honolulu, Hawaii has had many increases in its wattage since they started broadcasting at 10 watts as a Non-commercial educational FM radio station in 1969. In 1984 KTUH received permission from the board of regents to increase to 100 watts of power. More recently, in 2001, KTUH began transmitting at 3000 watts of power. KTUH is heard on an island wide frequency in Honolulu, Hawaii from 90.1 FM, as well as online at KTUH.ORG and on digital cable channel 866.

The earliest college radio stations carried news, intercollegiate sports, and music along with educational shows and sometimes distance learning courses. In the latter portion of the 20th century, many U.S. radio stations played what came to be known as "college rock" (later known as alternative rock), a type of rock music that had not yet hit the mainstream. Most radio stations have now diversified, with many following a very commercial-like music rotation during the weekdays, and having specialty shows on evenings and weekends. A few radio stations still employ a freeform programming.

College radio stations are typically considered to be public radio radio stations in the way that they are funded by donation and grants, but as a radio format the term "Public radio" generally refers to classical music, jazz, and news. A more accurate term is community radio, as most staff are volunteers, although many radio stations limit staff to current or recent students instead of anyone from the local community.

By the late 1970s, FM had taken off, and competition for channels for new radio stations was intensifying. The National Association of Broadcasters (NAB) and the newly founded National Public Radio (NPR) convinced the FCC that local low-power radio stations were somehow detrimental to broadcasting, and class D licenses were no longer issued for applications made after 1979, except for broadcast translators to repeat NAB and NPR members' radio stations. Making matters worse for the college stations, they were demoted to secondary status, meaning that they could be forced to downgrade or go silent if a full-power station chose to upgrade or to relocate closer to the college station.

Many radio stations were forced to upgrade their facilities at considerable expense. Many other radio stations were eventually forced off the air, because they could not afford the upgrades at all, or not in time to avoid being locked in by other expanding radio stations. There have also been instances where college radio stations have been forced off the air either temporarily or permanently by the school's administration.

Many college radio stations in the U.S. also carry syndicated programming, such as that of National Public Radio and affiliated regional networks. Some radio stations have had student programming taken off the air by the administration in favor of other uses, such as WWGC and KTXT. The original WGST was the subject of an involuntary takeover which saw the state's board of regents sell the radio station as "surplus" property.

A few radio stations have been added to the airwaves as the result of LPFM licensing in the U.S. One example of a Campus Radio station licensed as an LPFM is WIUX-LP of Indiana University, which is able to cover the entire city with its LPFM signal and is competitive in listenership numbers to nearby higher-powered commercial radio stations. Another example of this is WDSW-LP at Delta State University in Cleveland, Mississippi. WDSW-LP fully covers its community with a AAA/roots driven format unserved by other local broadcasters.

A number of campus radio stations in the US are available using alternate means such as streaming audio over the internet. Though continuing to broadcast traditionally over the air at 88.5FM, William Penn University's station KWPU in Oskaloosa, IA streams using RadioBOSS. Other such examples are WPTS-FM at the University of Pittsburgh, WJHU at Johns Hopkins University, and KUTU at Utah Tech University. Some stations use both traditional and internet radio platforms, such as Loyola University Chicago's WLUW, Lewis University's WLRA, University of Michigan's WCBN and Embry–Riddle Aeronautical University's WIKD-LP. Michigan State University's WDBM, University of Minnesota's KUOM, University of Wisconsin–Madison's WSUM, Elizabethtown College's WWEC, and Davidson College's WALT 1610 all broadcast via online streaming internet radio.

=== Uruguay ===
In 2006, the University of the Republic from Uruguay got the permits to host its own radio in the frequency 89.1 FM, which is controlled by its own team and students.

== See also ==
- High school radio
- Indie radio
- List of campus radio stations
- List of college radio stations in the United States
- Low-power broadcasting
- Modern rock (Alternative radio)
- UK Student Radio Association
