= Corder (surname) =

Corder is a surname. It has its roots primarily as an English occupational surname for a ropemaker, entering Middle English from Old French. It is also theorized to have come from a nickname for someone who wore a lot of bows or ribbons in some cases. Instances of the surname may also come from an Americanization of the German surname Korder. Notable people with the surname include:

- Ada Elizabeth Corder (1895–1987), Australian music teacher and pianist
- Colette Corder (1894–1982), German actress
- Dan Corder (born 1993), South African radio host
- Esther Corder (born 1998), Dutch cricketer
- Frank Eugene Corder (1956–1994), American who crashed his Cessna on the lawn of the White House
- Frederick Corder (1852–1932), English composer
- Hugh Corder (born 1954), South African professor
- Ian Corder (born 1960), British former Royal Navy officer
- James Watson Corder (1867–1953), English historian
- Jane Corder (1874–1965), British tennis player
- Jason Corder (born 1969), American producer
- Jim W. Corder (1929–1998), American professor
- John A. Corder (born 1939), United States Air Force general
- John Shewell Corder (1856–1922), English architect and artist
- Julius Corder (1958–2007), American actor
- Karen Corder (1968–2008), American murderer
- Michael Corder (born 1955), British choreographer
- Paul Corder (1879–1942), English composer
- Philip Corder (c. 1891–1961), British archaeologist
- Pit Corder (1918–1990), British professor
- Rosa Corder (1853–1893), Victorian artist in London
- Sharon Corder, American producer in Canada
- Susanna Corder (1787–1864), English educator and Quaker
- Tim Corder (born 1949), American politician
- William Corder (c. 1803–1828), English murderer
