= SERP =

SERP may refer to:

- Search engine results page, the listing of web pages returned by a search engine in response to a keyword query
- Society for Elimination of Rural Poverty, an autonomous society of the Department of Rural Development, Government of Andhra Pradesh
- State Earnings-Related Pension Scheme, a UK government pension arrangement running until 2002
