= XFM (disambiguation) =

Xfm is the former name of British commercial radio station Radio X.

XFM, Xfm or xfm may also refer to:

== Radio ==
=== Canada ===
- CJFX-FM, branded as 98.9 XFM, Antigonish, Nova Scotia
- CIOX-FM, branded as Xfm 101.1, Ottawa, Ontario
- CKVX-FM, branded as 104.9 Xfm, Chilliwack, British Columbia
- CFEX-FM, branded as X 92.9, Calgary, Alberta
- CKEX-FM, branded as X 100.7, Red Deer, Alberta

=== Others ===
- XFM (Denmark), student radio station in Denmark
- XFM (Philippines), radio network in the Philippines
- XFM Malta, commercial radio station in Malta
- XHFO-FM, radio station in Mexico City, branded as XFM 92.1
- 92.3 xFM, former radio station in Manila, Philippines (now FM Radio 92.3)
- XFM 96.3, a defunct Singaporean radio station
- XFM (Portugal), a defunct Portuguese radio station

== Other uses ==
- xfm (file manager)
- Xandros File Manager
- XFM (card specification) (aka Crossover Flash Memory), a JEDEC memory card specification

== See also ==
- DXFM, a radio station in Davao City, Philippines
