= Surg =

SURG is a radio station of Australia.

Surg, Surag or Soorag (Persian: سورگ) may refer to the following villages in Iran:

- Surg, Birjand, South Khorasan Province
- Surag, Qaen, South Khorasan Province

== See also ==
- Suraag – The Clue, an Indian detective television series
