= John Corder =

John Corder may refer to:

- John A. Corder, United States Air Force general
- John Shewell Corder, English architect and artist
