= KTUH =

Student radio station at the University of Hawai'i

Honolulu, Hawaii; United States
- Broadcast area: Honolulu metropolitan area
- Frequency: 90.1 MHz

Programming
- Format: Freeform

Ownership
- Owner: University of Hawaiʻi

History
- First air date: July 7, 1969
- Former frequencies: 90.5 MHz (1969–1985); 90.3 MHz (1985–2016)
- Call sign meaning: The University of Hawaii

Technical information
- Licensing authority: FCC
- Facility ID: 66592
- Class: C1
- ERP: 7,000 watts
- HAAT: 501 meters (1,644 ft)
- Transmitter coordinates: 21.3335°N 157.8148°W
- Translator: 91.1 K216GH (Waialua)

Links
- Public license information: Public file; LMS
- Webcast: Listen Live
- Website: ktuh.org

KTUH (90.1 MHz) is a non-commercial, student-run, listener-supported station in Honolulu, Hawaii. It is owned by the University of Hawaiʻi and it broadcasts a freeform radio format. Programming originates from studios on the campus at the University of Hawaiʻi at Mānoa. It runs 24 hours a day, all year round. The station holds periodic fundraisers on the air and also accepts donations on its website.

KTUH has an effective radiated power (ERP) of 7,000 watts. The transmitter is along Telephone Road on Mount Tantalus in Honolulu. Programming is also heard on 95-watt FM translator K216GH on 91.1 MHz in Waialua. KTUH is found on Oceanic Spectrum Cable digital channel 866 for the entire state of Hawaii.

== Programming ==
Shows are divided into consecutive three-hour blocks with a distinct musical theme per block. They are usually hosted by University of Hawaiʻi students or, occasionally, faculty members, alumni or members of the community.

As a diversified representative station in a multicultural environment, many musical genres are heard over the course of each week. They include Jazz, Hawaiian, Latino Sounds, Hip-Hop, Punk, Alternative Rock, Metal, Goth, Reggae, Electronic, Alternative Country, World Music and more.

== History ==
KTUH was Hawaii's first non-commercial FM station. It signed on the air on July 7, 1969. It was originally heard on 90.5 FM and was powered at only 10 watts. The station was originally on the air from 6:30 p.m. to 2:30 a.m. Studios were in Room 206 in Hawai'i Hall. It played a mix of classical music, jazz and progressive rock.

In 1971, KTUH was the first station in Hawaii to experiment with quadrophonic stereo broadcasts. In 1972, the station began broadcasting 24/7. In August 1973, KTUH engineers installed an FM translator atop Leahi Hospital in Kaimuki. The station was off the air for three months in 1974 and two months in 1977 as it made transmitter adjustments.

KTUH was originally only heard on campus and in surrounding neighborhoods. It increased its power to 100 watts in 1985 and switched to 90.3 FM, moving one spot down the dial. In 1996, it began accepting underwriting sponsorships to add money to the station budget. In July and August 2001, the station was off the air for several weeks to increase power to 3,000 watts. It also began live streaming on its website.

On March 19, 2016, it switched to its current frequency at 90.1 FM. That was coupled with a power boost to 7,000 watts and an increase in height above average terrain (HAAT) to 501 meters (1,644 ft) That gives KTUH island-wide coverage on Oahu and some reception on Moloka'i.

== See also ==
- Campus radio
- List of college radio stations in the United States
