= Campus Radio ME =

Radio station based in the United Arab Emirates

Campus Radio ME is an online student-run radio station based in the United Arab Emirates. It was founded by Ritesh Jeswani and Co-founded by Muhammad Ali Jamadar. Conceptualized in 2009 by Ritesh Jeswani, the radio was intended to voice student issues and opinions in the region. With an initial investment of 10,000 AED, the station aired for the first time on April 9, 2010, from Ritesh Jeswani's bedroom. Since then it has evolved to hosting no less than seven live talk shows and five genre-based shows featuring prominent musicians and genres in the region. Since its inception, it has garnered attention on both print media and mainstream radio and now has 24 volunteers and new offices. It was also the winner of Lenovo's Edgy Business Thinker contest in 2010.

More recently, Campus Radio ME was awarded prize winner of the Falcon's Lair competition sponsored by Virtuzone and Dubizzle, beating over 500 competing business concept proposals. Consequently, an expansion is due to begin with the station being re-launched on a larger scale.

With over 10,000 listeners a week worldwide, Campus Radio ME has grown to be one of the most listened to radios by students across the Middle Eastern region.

It currently airs with 12 live shows in the GMT+4 time zone:

- Happy Hours with Mina 'Zooberry' Zuberi & Ahmed 'Ozzy' Osman (Sunday–Wednesday 7 pm – 9 pm)
- The Wire with Ryan Bryle (Sunday–Wednesday 9 pm – 11 pm)
- The Curfew with Ritesh 'Whitecrayon' Jeswani (Sunday–Wednesday 11 pm – 1 am)
- BassFace with Tom Paye (Saturday 5 pm – 7 pm)
- Weekend Warmup with Nora 'Nano' Nasrallah (Thursday & Friday 7 pm – 9 pm)
- Streaming Chaos with Paul Williams (Friday–Saturday 3 pm – 5 pm)
- Lilkrow's Boombox with Sergie 'lilkrow' Corneille (Saturday 7 pm – 9 pm)
- Up your Bandwidth with Muhammad Ali 'Mali' Jamadar (Saturday noon – 2 pm)
- Urban Junky (Thursday 9 pm – 11 pm)
- The Take with Nora Baksh & Shyaire Ganglani (Saturday 1 pm – 3 pm)
- The Coded Flava with Mr Shef Codes (Saturday 9 pm – 11 pm)
- Vibe with DJ Vendetta (Thursday, Friday & Saturday 11 pm – 1 am)
