= WWEC =

- Elizabethtown, Pennsylvania; United States
- Broadcast area: Elizabethtown, Pennsylvania
- Frequency: 88.3 MHz
- Branding: WWEC 88.3

Programming
- Format: Campus Radio
- Affiliations: Elizabethtown College Department of Communications

Ownership
- Owner: Elizabethtown College

History
- First air date: August 25, 1990
- Former call signs: WWEC-AM 640 (1963) WQHE (1990) DWWEC (2011–2012)

Technical information
- Licensing authority: FCC
- Facility ID: 19356
- Class: A
- ERP: 100 watts
- HAAT: 35.0 meters
- Transmitter coordinates: 40°8′53.00″N 76°35′38.00″W

Links
- Public license information: Public file; LMS
- Webcast: Listen Live
- Website: etown.edu/media/wwec

WWEC (88.3 FM) is a student-run campus radio station. Owned by Elizabethtown College in Elizabethtown, PA in Lancaster County, PA, United States, the station is operated by the College's Department of Communications and serves the greater Elizabethtown, PA area.

== History ==
WWEC began broadcasting as a carrier current station as WWEC-AM 640 in 1963. In 1990, the AM station went off the air as the station began airing at 88.3 FM. Temporarily using the call letters WQHE beginning April 19, 1990, the station changed its call letters to WWEC on July 16, 1990 and officially went on air on August 25, 1990.

On July 9, 2008, the College applied to the Federal Communications Commission (FCC) for an STA order (Special Temporary Authority), however the filing was done on paper and details are not available online. On July 29, 2011, the station's license was cancelled and its call sign deleted by the FCC. On November 28, 2012, the FCC restored the station's license.

== See also ==
- List of college radio stations in the United States
