= Dan Corder =

South African radio personality (born 1993)

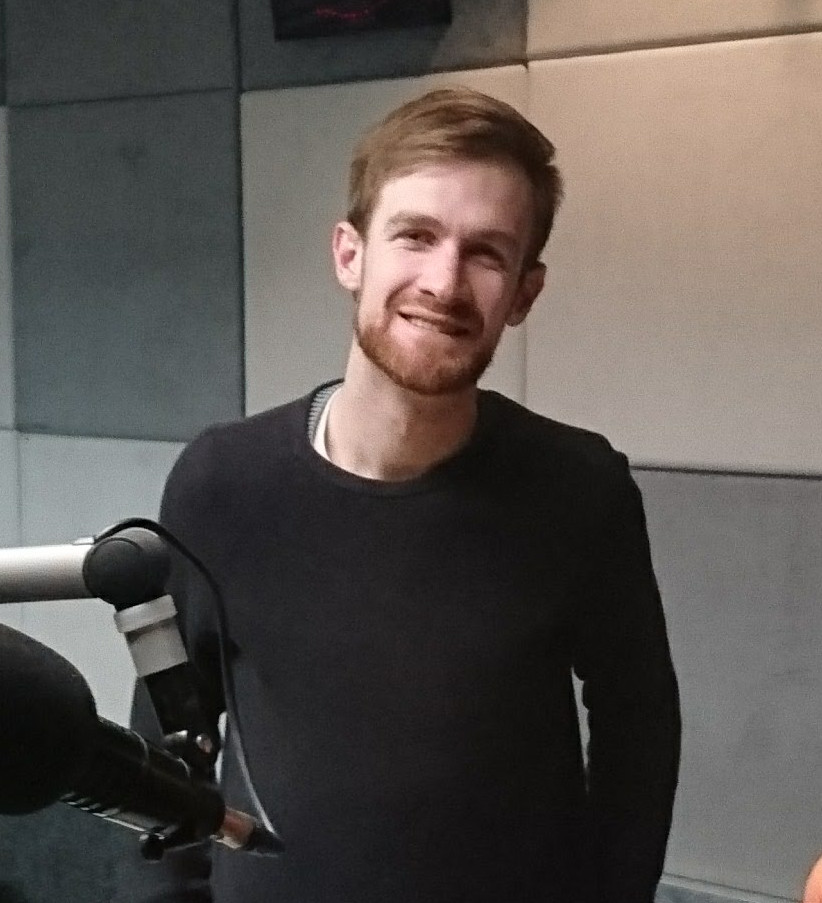
- Dan Corder in 2019.
- Born: Daniel Micah Molteno Corder; 10 November 1993 (age 33)
- Education: University of Cape Town
- Years active: 2014–present
- Father: Hugh Corder

Daniel Micah Molteno Corder (born 10 November 1993) is a South African television, radio, and Internet personality. After working for Good Hope FM (2015–2024) and 5FM (2021–2024) and starting the YouTube channel and podcast The Issue with Dan Corder, he presented The Dan Corder Show (2024–2026) on eNCA.

== Early life ==
Corder is the son of university academic Hugh Corder. Corder attended Westerford High School. He graduated with a Bachelor of Arts (BA) in English language and literature from the University of Cape Town.

== Career ==
Corder began his radio career with UCT Radio in 2014 and 2015. Corder won an MTN Award for his campus radio show Rise and Grind and contributed to the BBC World Service's coverage of Rhodes Must Fall. With Erik Mulder and Declan Manca, Corder created a short documentary titled Luister interviewing black students about their experiences at Stellenbosch University.

After graduating, Corder was hired by Good Hope FM to host The Weekend Breakfast Show. He co-hosted The Hype with Sherlin Barends in 2016 and started the Finding the Hype campaign, which offered local undiscovered artists a chance to receive radio play. The campaign was nominated for a 2016 Liberty Radio Award. Corder then had his own show Beats by Dan in 2017 and took over the weekday Good Hope FM Breakfast from Nigel Pierce in 2018, where he would remain until the end of his tenure in March 2021. At age 24 in 2018, Corder was South Africa's youngest breakfast show host.

In April 2021, Corder joined 5FM in as a weekday breakfast host. He founded the company Good Sequences in 2023, through which he started the political commentary YouTube channel and podcast The Issue with Dan Corder. Clips from Corder's videos and streams also gained popularity on TikTok.

Corder left 5FM in April 2024 to present the satirical late night show The Dan Corder Show on eNCA, following suit from previous late night show host Loyiso Gola.

== Personal life ==
Corder was in a relationship with film director and producer Jessie Zinn.

== Books ==
- Corder, Dan (21 September 2026). The Miseducation of South Africa: Busting Myths About Our Biggest Debates. Cape Town: Jonathan Ball Publishers. ISBN 978-1776195688.
