= MUNTfm =

University student radio station

Coordinates: 41.2997°S 174.7767°E

MUNT fm is the student radio station for the Massey University Wellington Campus in Wellington, New Zealand. It is commercial free and shows are run entirely by volunteers. MUNT stands for Massey University Network Transmissions. The broadcast is located at 88.5 FM.

According to the MUNT fm website:

MUNT fm prides itself on being 100% commercial free, with a unique musical format and presenters unlike any other radio station in Wellington (some of them should really be committed).
The MUNT fm shows are run entirely by volunteers and most of those are current students. Each DJ is responsible for the music, the content, and the style of their show meaning no show is the same; we have Punk shows, Reggae shows, Rock revival shows, Breaks, techno, D & B and most other ‘Electronic’ styles, wicked indie shows and shows that are nearly impossible to categorise so there’s something for everyone, well except for you cheesy commercial pop fiends – Go find another radio station, we don’t want you! If it’s popular on the Edge, ZM, More fm, or any of other advertising absorbed stations then we don’t do it, say it, or play it. There are the odd exceptions though, but that’s only when commercial radio pulls its finger out and plays something decent.

== History ==
MUNT fm began broadcasting in February 2003. It is based in the heart of the Massey design campus in the old Dominion Museum building off Buckle Street. It is a department of the Massey Wellington Students' Association (a.k.a. MAWSA) who partly fund the station, hence its ability to remain commercial free. The station brings in extra money through show sponsorship so it can continue to grow and to run events around Wellington.
