= Community radio in South Africa =

South African nonprofit radio

In South Africa, Community Radio refers to a non-profit, service-oriented radio that is solely owned and operated by the community, with no government interference. It encourages communication and connects the people of the community and across cultures.

== History ==
Since the commencement of Community Radio in the early 1990s, it has become increasing popular, especially in rural communities. Community radio's rise in South Africa is attributable to the dismantling of apartheid and an example of building a democracy and civil society within the country. The community radio division was officially formed in 1993 by a parliamentary Act – Independent Broadcasting Authority (IBA) Act. This was formed to democratise the radio broadcasters, to encourage ownership and to ensure that there was no meddling from the South African government at the time

From 1994 onwards, the IBA began issuing community stations with temporarily 12-month licenses to broadcast. Two years later, in 1996, South Africa's regulations for Community Radio allowed four year licensing When the request to apply for a four-year licensing was issued, the supervisory body received about 252 applications, when they had been expecting much less Today, there are over 200 community radio stations, in all nine provinces which are licensed to broadcast, which includes ethnic and religious stations

== Funding ==
Funding can be an immense problem, especially when radio stations are serving communities and are incapable to support it, because of various social and economic underdevelopments There are many struggling stations who find it difficult to generate an income, because of the impoverished communities they serve. Most community radio stations are funded by external donor countries and international development agencies while other stations rely on advertising, sponsorship and voluntary services; however the lack thereof leads to a lack of funds to reward their presenters sufficiently. As a result, numerous community radio stations have inexperienced staff members.

Stations are managed by a board of directors and a committee which is elected by the community. Smaller community radios operate with minimal equipment. Added to this, there are some stations functioning on temporary one-year licenses, as an alternative to the full four-year licenses, which is adding additional difficulty to the production of income and financial planning. President of the World Association of Community Broadcasters (AMARC, by its French initials), Steve Buckley noted that state subsidies for community media are the norm in Europe and North America, but it largely lacking in Africa, particularly in South Africa.

== Licensing ==
Licensing for community radio broadcast services is considered necessary, as it ensures fair and equitable access the radio spectrum. Licensing should be designed to support the development of the radio station, which should not restrict them in any way, or to be controlled and monitored by the South African government over broadcast content as well as ownership. The entire process should be clear of government interference. Licensing procedures should be fair and apparent and set out in law. It should be the responsibility of an independent licensing body. There should be no unnecessary obstacles that would exclude communities from having a radio broadcaster. The process of applying must be responsive to the demands of the community, as it is community based. There ought to be no unreasonable technical, economic or other barriers to gain entry for a license. Criteria for the station should be primarily based on demonstrating social purpose and benefit and sufficient requirements for the community participation in ownership and function of the service. According to the Broadcasting Act no 4 of 1999 a "“community” includes a geographically founded community or any group of persons or sector of the public having a specific, ascertainable common interest". This Act furthermore describes "“community broadcasting service” means a broadcasting service which is a) fully controlled by a non-profit entity and carried on for non-profitable purposes; b) serves a particular community; c) encourages members of the community served by it or persons associated with or promoting the interests of such community to d) participate in the selection and provision of programmes to be broadcast in the course of such broadcasting service; and e) may be funded by donations, grants, sponsorships or advertising or membership fees, or by any combination of the aforementioned".
