= PUK FM 93.6 =

PUKfm 93.6

Potchefstroom; South Africa
- Frequency: 93.6 FM

Links
- Website: www.nwu.ac.za/pukfm

PUKfm 93.6 is a South African campus radio station based in Potchefstroom in the North West. PUKfm 93.6 is the Liberty Radio Awards 2018 Campus Station of the Year.

== Coverage areas ==
- North West University, Potchefstroom only

== Broadcast languages ==
- Afrikaans
- English

== Broadcast time ==
- 24/7

== Target audience ==
- Primarily students, secondary (scholars and young working adults)
- LSM Groups 6–10
- Age Group 16–25

== Programme format ==
- 30% Talk
- 70% Music

== Listenership Figures ==
Estimated Listenership
	7 Day
May 2018	18,000
Jun 2013	5,000
May 2013	2,000
Feb 2013	7,000
Dec 2012	7,000
