= 87.8 UCFM =

UCFM
- Canberra; Australia
- Broadcast area: Belconnen, Australian Capital Territory, Australia
- Frequency: 87.8 MHz FM (2009–)

Programming
- Language: English
- Format: Campus radio
- Affiliations: The Owl

Ownership
- Owner: University of Canberra
- Operator: Faculty of Arts and Design

History
- First air date: 10 August 1994 (as CUE FM)
- Former names: CUe FM (1994–2015); 87.8 UCFM (2015–2021); UCFM (2021–)
- Former frequencies: 87.7 MHz FM (1994–2008)

Technical information
- Licensing authority: ACMA
- Transmitter coordinates: 35.238167°S 149.08557°E

Links
- Website: ucfm.com.au

UCFM (ACMA callsign: 1A12) is an independent student radio station broadcasting from the University of Canberra (UC). It transmits under a narrowcast licence, 24 hours a day, seven days a week. The station's two studios are located in Building 9 of UC's Bruce campus. UCFM generally broadcasts a mix of adult album alternative, local news, and talk radio. Much of the station's music comes from Australian artists.

Since 2019, UCFM has been governed by UC's Faculty of Arts and Design (FAD). Student volunteers produce most of the station's content with staff members running day-to-day operations. Alongside its capacity as a community broadcaster, UCFM is considered an educational resource by the University. This has meant a majority of student volunteers come from UC's journalism and sports media programs. UCFM is also partnered with The Owl, an online student publication run at the University.

UCFM transmits on FM 87.8 MHz across the District of Belconnen. It has a broadcast range of approximately two kilometres surrounding UC’s main campus. The station also broadcasts online through the UCFM website and the iHeartRadio platform. Alongside radio, UCFM publishes student-produced programming and podcasts on its website and a number of audio streaming platforms, including Spotify.

== History ==
The station began transmitting on 10 August 1994 as CUe FM. CUe FM was originally operated by a student society, under the governance of the University of Canberra Union (UCU). Its studio was first located in the UC Refectory, found within Building 1 of UC’s Bruce campus.

By 2015, operations were handled by a team of student and alumni volunteers with the station rebranded as 87.8 UCFM. The station transitioned to a predominately music-based broadcast, positioning itself as “Canberra's Alternative”. Their broadcast included Top 40 Pop, Indie, and Alternative music. During this time, the station was transmitting across North Canberra from a studio within The Hub, a central complex in UC’s main concourse. 87.8 UCFM received no funding from the UCU or the University and covered operating costs through sponsorships, donations, membership fees, and by broadcasting a minimal amount of advertising.

From 2019, the University moved the station under the governance of FAD. FAD officially relaunched the station in 2021 as UCFM. This rebrand included a new tagline for the station, now dubbed "Canberra’s #1 Student Station". These changes also saw purpose-built studios installed in Building 9. This placed UCFM in close proximity with much of the University's communications and media production programs.

On 10 August 2024, UCFM celebrated its 30th year of broadcasting.

== Controversy with the Australian Communications and Media Authority ==
Unlike other Australian campus radio stations, UCFM does not transmit on a full power Education/Community Broadcast licence but is limited to a Narrowcast licence. Close proximity allocation by the Australian Communications and Media Authority (ACMA) of other narrowcast licences has caused interference with UCFM's signal and numerous applications for a full upgrade have been refused by ACMA.

Despite UCFM's continuous broadcasting for more than two-decades, making it one of the original Narrowcast licences in Canberra the broadcast governing body neglected to reserve and offer UCFM a suitable frequency for a full Education / Community Licence in the Canberra Licence Area Plan. The ACMA instead showing preference to allocate the scarce FM radio spectrum frequencies to existing ABC, SBS, and Commercial Radio licence holder's second transmitters in the Tuggeranong Valley, as well as the establishment of newer niche Community FM stations dedicated to the Arts, Multiculturalism, and Religion.

== See also ==
- List of radio stations in Australia
