= Radioeco.it =

radio-eco.it
Pisa; Italy
- Broadcast area: Pisa area

Programming
- Language: Italian
- Format: News, music and entertainment

History
- First air date: 2007

Links
- Website: radio-eco.it

Radio-eco.it is the official web-radio station of the University of Pisa, Italy. The radio is fully run by University students, whose aim is to inform and entertain all the students of the University. The main purpose of this non-profit organization is to give voice to the University students of the Pisa area. The radio studios are located in the Faculty of Economics of Pisa, Pisa, and it is possible to listen to the radio via its website and through mobile devices, as the TuneIn app and Nokia Internet Radio. The radio broadcasts 24/7 and features several live programmes each day, from band interviews to politics and economics debates. The radio also runs a reporting and blogging activity, mainly concerning events and students' initiatives.

== History ==
Radio-eco.it began broadcasting in 2007, after the first members of the staff had the opportunity to participate to the workshop UniOnAir promoted by Il sole 24 Ore. The first radio programmes were broadcast from one of the lecture rooms of the faculty, using just a microphone and a small mixer. Gradually, the radio has grown both in terms of equipment, number of members, quality and kinds of activities. In 2009 it was ranked among the best 25 Italian university web radio by Wired Italia, a popular magazine.

The radio staff is made by voluntary students who do not gain any advantage from participating to the project. Speakers, djs, technicians, and producers are all students, and the project is funded by self fund-raising and the Faculty of Economics.

Radio-eco.it is part of the national network of University web-radios, Raduni, and the association UStation. Many of the guidelines of University stations are shared between all the radios which are part of these networks. Radio-eco.it is a non-commercial station. It is far from any logic of profit-making, it does not broadcast commercial advertisement and does not sell any space on its website. Its aim is to provide a quality and unique information and entertainment service to the University students, and to be an open space for the student to be informed and debate upon the topics that concern them directly. Radio-eco.it selects good quality music, from '50-'60s classic rock to the actual alternative scene, and gives prominence to emerging bands and local artists, in order to promote emerging artists and to propose a different musical selection from mainstream FM radios.

== Current activities ==
radio-eco.it produces a rich offer of eighteen different shows, which are broadcast live weekly. The radio programmes range from University news, national politics, in-depth music programmes, interviews to band, in-studio acoustic sets to economics and socio-political analysis.

When there are no live shows or repeats, radio-eco.it plays a selection of music in the form of mix-tapes created by the members of the Music Area.

Starting from 2011/2012 season, radio-eco.it has expanded its News Area and started publishing daily news, leaders and reportages about topics considered of interest for the University community. The radio follows all the important events that take place in Pisa, and provides real-time updates through its website and social networks.

== Availability ==
radioeco.it is on air 24/24 in streaming on the official website. It's also available on most apps TuneIn, available for iPhone, Android, Blackberry for most of modern smartphones and on the Nokia Internet Radio platform.

Most of the shows produced by the radio are available as podcasts.
