= Kovsie FM 97.0 =

- Bloemfontein; South Africa
- Broadcast area: Free State
- Frequency: 97.0 MHz
- Branding: Kovsie FM 97.0

Programming
- Languages: English; Afrikaans; Sotho
- Format: Community radio
- Affiliations: University of the Free State

History
- First air date: 1978

Technical information
- Licensing authority: ICASA

Links
- Website: www.facebook.com/KovsieFM97

Kovsie FM 97.0 is a campus/community radio station in Bloemfontein, South Africa. The station is located on the grounds of the University of the Free State and broadcasts to a radius of about 80 km

Kovsie FM was founded in 1978 by a group of students, and broadcast only inside the cafeteria. In 1995 it was granted a license by the IBA, now called ICASA (Independent Communications Authority of South Africa) granting Kovsie FM a broadcasting license on the frequency 97.0 FM.

Kovsie FM 97.0 broadcasts in English, Afrikaans and Sotho, and their focus is on the youth between the ages of 15–35. Their mission includes community involvement, training and development, being a platform for local musicians, providing an accurate, unbiased news service, and sustainability.

The station employs 8 full-time personnel, including a station manager (Gerben Van Niekerk), programming manager (JayBee Makhalemele), marketing manager (Neo Mojito), music manager (Mathipe Thipe), production manager (Sydney Ntozakhe), sports editor and news editor (Kelee Powell).

== Coverage areas and frequencies ==
=== Coverage ===
- Bloemfontein
- Brandfort
- Winburg
- Parts of Dewetsdorp

=== Frequency ===
- 97.0 FM

== Broadcast languages ==
- English
- Afrikaans
- Sotho

== Broadcast time ==
24/7

== Target audience ==
- LSM Groups 6 – 10
- Age Group 14 – 35
- Scholars, students, young working adults

== Programme format ==
- 80% Music
- 20% Talk

== Listenership figures ==
Estimated Listenership
	7 Day
Sep 2018	1,000
Jun 2018	-
Mar 2018	-
Dec 2017	3,000
Dec 2016	7,000
Dec 2015	10,000
Feb 2015	30,000
Feb 2013	21,000
Dec 2012	34,000
Oct 2012	40,000
Aug 2012	52,000
Jun 2012	47,000

== Location ==
Thakaneng Bridge, University of the Free State, Bloemfontein, Free State
