= KTU radio Gaudeamus =

University

Coordinates: 54.8985°N 23.921°E

- Type: radio and online
- Country: Lithuania
- Availability: National; International
- Owner: Kaunas University of Technology
- Key people: founder and head of the programme Giedrius Kuprevičius (dean of the Faculty of Humanities), head of the radio station Paulius Sluškonis, technical director Jonas Valančius.
- Launch date: 2005 (internet); 2008 (FM)
- Dissolved: 2014
- Official website: http://www.gaudeamus.fm

KTU radio Gaudeamus was one of the first university radio stations in Lithuania. It was founded at Kaunas University of Technology (KTU) in 2005. Radio station was available via analogue 93,6 MHz FM frequency in Kaunas city and on the internet. "Gaudeamus" was one main radio station based in the center of Kaunas in the Faculty of Humanities of KTU.

== Programming ==
"Gaudeamus" was non-commercial youth and academic community oriented radio station, broadcasting jazz and other alternative music styles. Most of the programmes ware dedicated for local and worldwide cultural, scientific and artistic news. "Gaudeamus" also had many programmes about different kinds of music: special shows for different kind of jazz, rock, classical or religious music.

== History ==
Internet radio station "Gaudeamus" was founded in 2005. In February 2008 the Communications Regulatory Authority of the Republic of Lithuania (RRT) gave the right to "Gaudeamus" to start broadcast on FM frequency in Kaunas city. The mover and the main ideological leader of the station was the Dean of the Faculty of Humanities (KTU) prof. Giedrius Kuprevičius. "Gaudeamus" stopped broadcasting on 31 December 2014. Decision to dissolve was made by the University with the agreement of Faculty of Humanities.
