= UCT Radio =

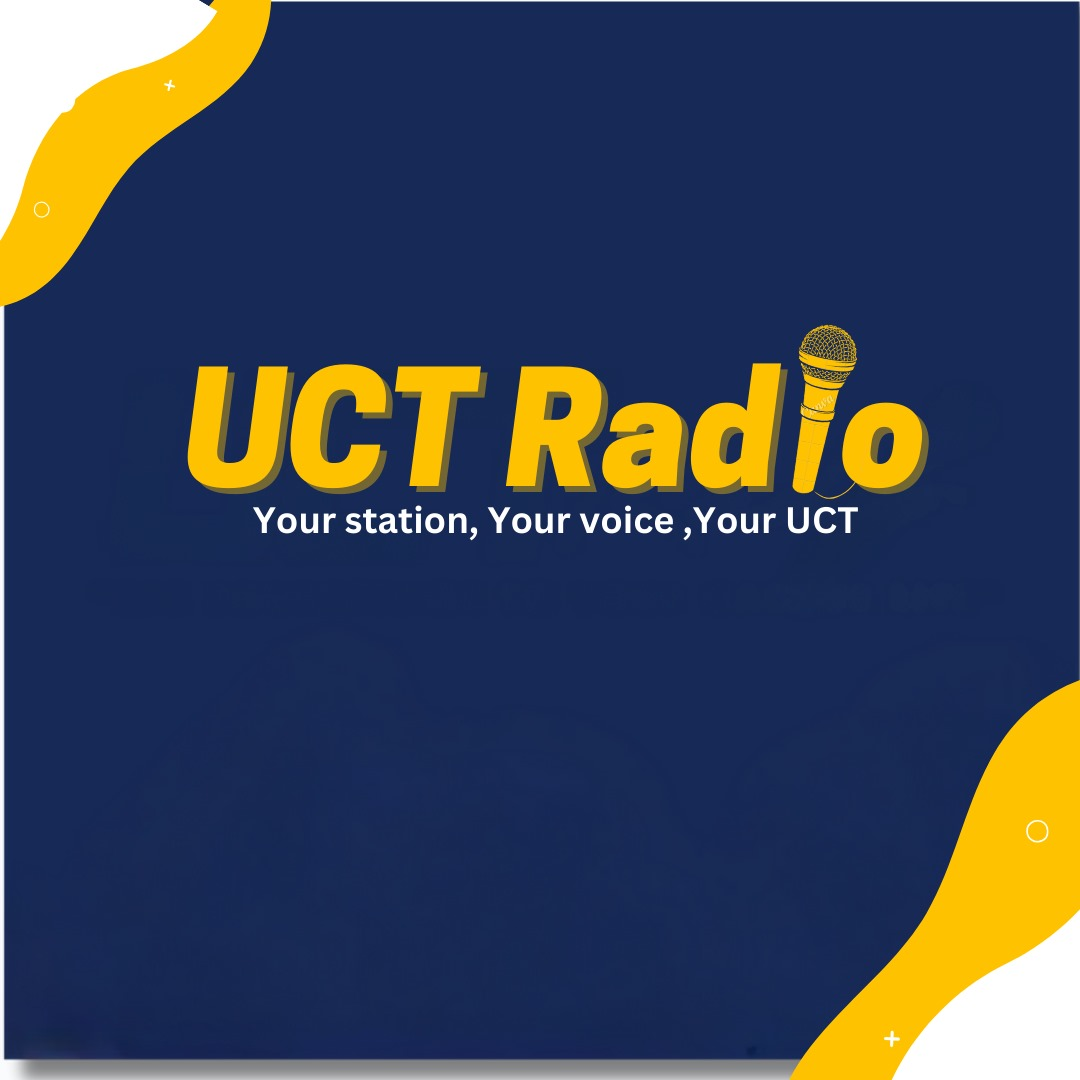
- Cape Town; South Africa
- Broadcast area: Cape Town

Programming
- Format: Campus radio

Ownership
- Owner: University of Cape Town

History
- First air date: 1976

Links
- Website: www.radio.uct.ac.za

UCT Radio is a campus radio station operated by students of the University of Cape Town (UCT) in Cape Town, South Africa. UCT Radio broadcasts on the online at radio.uct.ac.za. The station broadcasts from the main Upper Campus in the Southern Suburbs.

== Management ==
- Station Manager: Natalie Brandreth
- Programme Manager: Yorke Coulson
- Tech Manager: Kyle Robbertze
- HR Manager: Rita Palmer
- Marketing Manager: Keira Dominick
- Traffic Manager: Zoe-Joy Bartman
- Head DJ: Saint Makhaye
- Music Manager: Rayne Lombard
- Production Manager: Zodia Cloete
- News Manager: Verna-Dean Napoleon
- Social Media Manager: Zah Zikhali
- Online and Content Manager: Siphesihle Malimela
- Events Manager: Boitumelo Mphahlele

== Notable alumni ==
Dan Corder (5FM Presenter) Mark Gillman (Former 5FM presenter), Randall Abrahams (Former Idols SA judge), Station Director Russell Warner (transformed the station into a community broadcaster and consequently obtained the first legal and current licence to broadcast on the FM 104.5 frequency using a 20 W transmitter). For the first time UCT Radio was a fully fledged radio station as opposed to a wired public address system (there was a history of the occasional pirate wireless broadcast from time to time until authorities would shut it down. Suga (Good Hope FM/MC at 46664 events), Bongani Njoli (e.tv) and Natalie Bekker (P4/Free Spirit/Top Billing presenter).
