= Tuks FM =

Radio station at the University of Pretoria

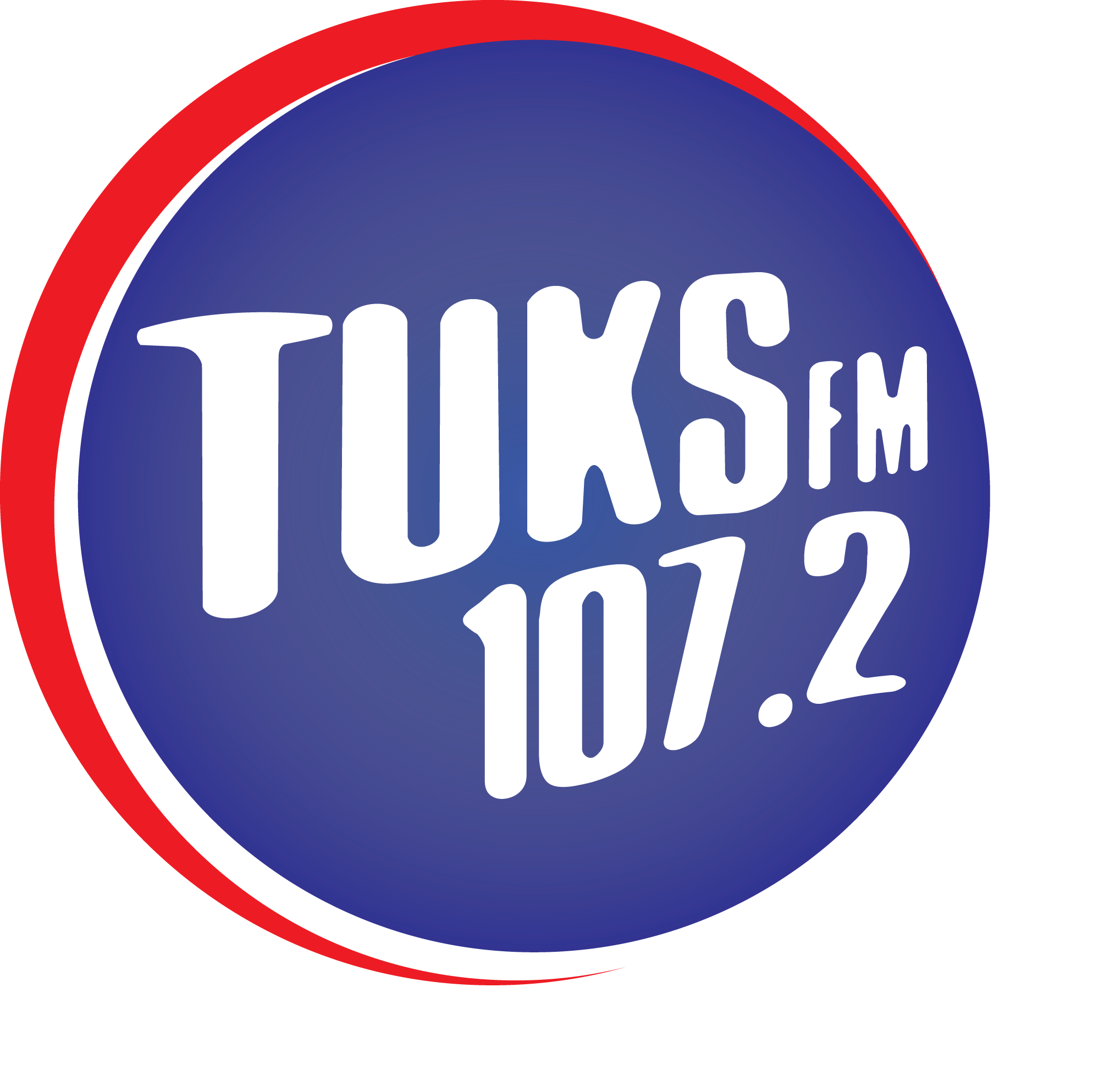
- Pretoria; South Africa
- Broadcast area: Greater Tshwane; University of Pretoria campus
- Frequency: 107.2 MHz FM
- Branding: Tuks FM 107.2

Programming
- Format: Campus / Community radio, music, news

Ownership
- Owner: University of Pretoria

History
- First air date: 1976 (student society) · 9 Feb 1981 (campus broadcast) · 24 Apr 1995 (FM launch)

Technical information
- ERP: 1 kW

Links
- Website: https://www.tuksfm.co.za/

Tuks FM (formerly Radio Tuks) is the campus- and community-radio station of the University of Pretoria in South Africa. It is one of the country's first campus broadcasters to be granted a permanent community-radio FM licence.

== History ==
=== Early starts (1976–1980) ===
Tuks FM traces its origins to 1976, when a group of University of Pretoria students created a broadcasting society known as Radio Tuks. The Student Representative Council (SRC) formally recognised the society, and a small studio was constructed on the main campus. Early broadcasts were transmitted by means of the cafeteria's public-address system using the university's telephone wiring, and consisted primarily of music programming that quickly became popular among students.

Despite this early interest, the station entered a period of instability. In 1977 the SRC disbanded Radio Tuks following a combination of financial mismanagement, unresolved licensing limitations imposed by the South African Broadcasting Corporation (SABC), and technical constraints. Attempts to revive the station during the late 1970s were hampered by limited resources and the absence of clear legal pathways for student radio broadcasting under the regulatory framework of the time.

=== Campus broadcasting and expansion (1981–1990) ===
A major revival began in 1980 when the SRC designated Radio Tuks its flagship project for the year. A new management committee, led by Christof Heyns, secured funding and student volunteers. During the December 1980 recess, a purpose-built studio was constructed, allowing for a more professional broadcasting operation.

On 9 February 1981 Radio Tuks officially relaunched, with a well-publicised opening ceremony and broadcasts from the new studio. Initially limited to three hours per weekday, broadcast time was quickly expanded as demand grew. Over the following two years, the station installed a second studio using donated equipment from the SABC, extended its operating hours to more than ten hours per day, and broadened its reach to include university residences, satellite campuses, and the student newspaper offices. Nearly 50 kilometres of telephone lines were installed to support this campus-wide wired distribution system—one of the most extensive of its kind in South Africa at the time.

The 1980s also marked the beginning of Radio Tuks's cultural influence on student life. The station developed a reputation for alternative and contemporary music programming and hosted lunchtime concerts and campus events. While officially under SRC oversight, Radio Tuks frequently tested the boundaries of acceptable content, occasionally clashing with university management over issues such as language policy, music choice, and editorial independence. These tensions unfolded against the backdrop of the apartheid era's restrictive broadcasting environment and growing student exposure to global youth culture.

=== Temporary FM licences (1990–1994) ===
By the early 1990s, the station's leadership increasingly viewed FM broadcasting as essential. Telephone-line delivery limited sound quality and reach, and the end of apartheid's rigid regulatory regime created new possibilities for campus and community radio.

Radio Tuks obtained several temporary FM broadcasting licences during this period:

- 1993 – short-term licence on 90.5 FM, used during Rag, Intervarsity and Spring Day.
- 1994 – a one-month licence allowing broadcasts on 107.2 FM from 5 February to 5 March.

The 1994 licence was particularly significant, enabling the station to broadcast from 07:00 to 22:00 on weekdays and from 10:00 until midnight on weekends. Programming included a high-profile appearance by 5FM presenter Barney Simon, who promoted an “Alternative Party” at the university's sports grounds that attracted a large crowd.

Despite the popularity of these FM tests, Radio Tuks was required to revert to wired campus broadcasting once the temporary licences expired.

=== Permanent licence (1995) ===
A landmark moment occurred on 9 February 1995, when the newly formed Independent Broadcasting Authority (IBA) held a public hearing at Loftus Versfeld Stadium to assess Radio Tuks's application for a permanent licence. The application was successful: on 6 March 1995 the station was awarded a community radio licence, making it one of the early beneficiaries of South Africa's post-apartheid broadcasting reforms.

Official community FM broadcasts commenced on 24 April 1995 on 107.2 FM.

=== Post-1995 community broadcasting and growth ===
The transition to FM fundamentally reshaped the station. By 1996, Tuks FM was broadcasting up to 18 hours per day, seven days a week, offering a mix of contemporary and alternative music, eight daily news bulletins, student life coverage, arts and culture segments, and specialist shows such as the “Fridge FM Alternative Hour”. The station was described as “one of the biggest community radio stations in the country”.

Tuks FM developed into a training ground for aspiring broadcasters, with many former volunteers later joining major South African radio and media platforms.

During the 2000s and 2010s the station updated its music format in response to changing student demographics and listener preferences. In February 2014, audience research estimated weekly listenership at approximately 66 000, confirming its role as a significant youth-oriented broadcaster in the greater Pretoria region.

Today Tuks FM remains a prominent fixture in South African community broadcasting, retaining strong links with the University of Pretoria while serving a wider metropolitan audience.

== Awards and recognition ==
Tuks FM has been repeatedly recognised at the MTN Radio Awards, Liberty Radio Awards and the South African Radio Awards for excellence in campus broadcasting. The station has earned awards across multiple categories including Station of the Year, music shows, talk programming, on-air talent and community engagement.

Awards and recognition
| Year | Award | Category | Recipient / work | Result | Ref(s) |
|---|---|---|---|---|---|
| 2012 | MTN Radio Awards | Campus Station of the Year | Tuks FM 107.2 | Winner | |
| 2012 | MTN Radio Awards | Daytime Presenter – Campus | Alex Caige | Winner | |
| 2012 | MTN Radio Awards | Music Show – Campus | Totally SA Show | Winner | |
| 2013 | MTN Radio Awards | Campus Station of the Year | Tuks FM 107.2 | Winner | |
| 2013 | MTN Radio Awards | Breakfast Show – Campus | The Bang-Bang Breakfast | Winner | |
| 2013 | MTN Radio Awards | Breakfast Presenter – Campus | Alex Caige | Winner | |
| 2014 | MTN Radio Awards | Campus Station of the Year | Tuks FM 107.2 | Winner | |
| 2014 | MTN Radio Awards | Breakfast Show – Campus | The Wake Up | Winner | |
| 2014 | MTN Radio Awards | Daytime Show – Campus | The Lunch Break | Winner | |
| 2014 | MTN Radio Awards | Weekend Radio Show – Campus | Top 30 | Winner | |
| 2015 | MTN Radio Awards | Campus Station of the Year | Tuks FM 107.2 | Winner | |
| 2015 | MTN Radio Awards | Night-time Show – Campus | Alt La Femme | Winner | |
| 2015 | MTN Radio Awards | Afternoon Drive Show – Campus | The Drive Way | Winner | |
| 2015 | MTN Radio Awards | Promotion/Stunt/Event – Campus | World Radio Challenge | Winner | |
| 2015 | MTN Radio Awards | On-air Packaging – Campus/Community | Tuks FM 107.2 | Winner | |
| 2017 | Liberty Radio Awards | Night-time Show – Campus | Alt La Femme | Winner | |
| 2018 | Liberty Radio Awards | Afternoon Drive Show – Campus | The Drive Way | Winner | |
| 2018 | Liberty Radio Awards | Breakfast Presenter – Campus | Nicholas Lawrence | Winner | |
| 2018 | Liberty Radio Awards | Bright Star inductees | Quintus Potgieter; Tayla Welch | Inducted | |
| 2019 | Liberty Radio Awards | Campus Station of the Year | Tuks FM 107.2 | Winner | |
| 2019 | Liberty Radio Awards | Music Show – Campus | Locals Only | Winner | |
| 2019 | Liberty Radio Awards | Night-time Show – Campus | The Tuks FM Hip Hop Show | Winner | |
| 2019 | Liberty Radio Awards | Podcast | Hear the Sights | Winner | |
| 2020 | SA Radio Awards | Campus Station of the Year | Tuks FM 107.2 | Winner | |
| 2020 | SA Radio Awards | Promotions Stunt/Event – Campus | See the Sounds – A Radio Broadcast for the Deaf | Winner | |
| 2021 | Radio Awards | Station of the Year (Campus) | Tuks FM | Winner | |
| 2021 | Radio Awards | Community Project – Campus | Mental Matters | Winner | |
| 2021 | Radio Awards | Multi-channel Promotion | Tuks FM Sends a Dream to Space | Winner | |
| 2021 | Radio Awards | Promotions Stunt/Event | Global Network Outreach Program | Winner | |
| 2021 | Radio Awards | Business & Finance Show | The Black Umbrellas Business Show | Winner | |
| 2021 | Radio Awards | Music Show – Campus | House Culture | Winner | |
| 2023 | South African Radio Awards | Station of the Year (Campus) | Tuks FM | Winner | |
| 2023 | South African Radio Awards | Afternoon Drive Presenter – Campus | Tshepang Moji | Winner | |
| 2023 | South African Radio Awards | Afternoon Drive Show – Campus | Tuks FM Drive with Jodell Tantij | Winner | |
| 2023 | South African Radio Awards | Breakfast Show – Campus | The Big Chief on Breakfast | Winner | |
| 2023 | South African Radio Awards | Community Project | Tuks FM The Voice | Winner | |
| 2023 | South African Radio Awards | Music Show – Campus | Tuks FM Top 40 | Winner | |
| 2023 | South African Radio Awards | Night-time Show – Campus | The Tuks FM Sex Show | Winner | |
| 2023 | International Student Broadcasting Championship | People's Choice Award | Tshepang Moji | Winner | |
| 2023 | International Student Broadcasting Championship | Best New Podcast | The Tuks FM Sex Show | Winner | |
| 2024 | International Student Broadcast Championships | Best Talk Presenter | Tshegofatso Makola | Winner | |
| 2024 | International Student Broadcast Championships | Best Specialty Presenter | Tshepi Moji | Winner | |
| 2024 | International Student Broadcast Championships | Best Social Media Execution | UP FM Rebrand Stunt | Winner | |
| 2024 | International Student Broadcast Championships | Station of the Year | Tuks FM | Runner-up | |
| 2024 | Telkom Radio Awards | Best Weekend Show – Campus | Tuks FM Top 40 | Winner | |
| 2024 | Telkom Radio Awards | Best Community Project – Campus | FLY@UP Thrift | Winner | |
| 2024 | Telkom Radio Awards | Best Daytime Show – Campus | Tuks FM Brunch | Winner | |
| 2024 | Telkom Radio Awards | Best Promotions/Stunt Event – Campus | Freshers | Winner | |
| 2025 | International Student Broadcasting Championship | Best News Broadcaster | Tshegofatso Makola | Winner | |

== Notable alumni ==
The station has produced a number of broadcasters, journalists and media personalities who have gone on to national prominence in South Africa.

- Anele Mdoda – radio and television presenter; began her broadcasting career at the station.
- Gareth Cliff – broadcaster and founder of CliffCentral; started his radio career here.
- Ayanda MVP – radio and television presenter known for work on YFM and 947.
- Barney Simon – veteran rock DJ; presented on the station after his tenure at 5FM.
- Darren Scott – radio and sports broadcaster.
- Poppy Ntshongwana – national radio presenter on 5FM.
- Eleni Giokos – CNN and international business news anchor.
- Sindisiwe van Zyl – medical doctor, broadcaster and columnist.
- Rob Forbes – broadcaster on 5FM and Jacaranda FM.
- Rian van Heerden – broadcaster and author.
- Liezel van der Westhuizen – television and radio presenter.
- Simon Dingle – author, broadcaster and fintech commentator; served as station manager and presenter.
- Tim Zunckel – radio producer, consultant and broadcaster.
- Kriya Gangiah – radio and television presenter.
- Carmen Reddy – broadcaster and journalist.
- Alex Caige – presenter on 947 and 5FM.
- Grant Nash – former 5FM presenter.
- Frankie du Toit – broadcaster on 5FM.
- Sias du Plessis – sports broadcaster and presenter.
- Zanele Potelwa – national radio presenter on 5FM and television personality.
- Kim Schulze – radio and television presenter.
- Keabetswe Boya – presenter on 5FM and podcaster.
- Dimpho Mokgotho – broadcaster and presenter.
- Bokang Jiyane – radio and media presenter.
- Duncan Pollock – radio presenter and boxing ring announcer.
- Chris Jordan – broadcaster and media trainer.
- Jacques du Preez – broadcaster and content producer.
- Mari van Heerden – journalist and broadcaster.

== See also ==
- University of Pretoria
- Community radio in South Africa
- South African Broadcasting Corporation
- Voëlvry movement
