= MFM 92.6 =

South Africa
- Broadcast area: South Africa – Regional; Stellenbosch; FM & DAB
- Frequency: FM: 92.6

Programming
- Format: Campus radio

Ownership
- Owner: Stellenbosch University

History
- First air date: 1995

Links
- Website: MFM Homepage

MFM 92.6 is a campus radio station based in Stellenbosch, South Africa. The station broadcasts in the region of a 20 km radius to approximately 35 000 listeners. The station broadcasts 24/7 and is targeted to the youth market, and in particular, Stellenbosch University students. It broadcasts in Afrikaans, English and Xhosa and is a member of the National Association of Broadcasters of South Africa (NAB).

== History ==
The station was started in 1995, broadcasting only in the Stellenbosch University's Student Centre, the Neelsie.

== Coverage areas and frequencies ==
- Stellenbosch and surrounding Boland area
- 92.6 FM

== Broadcast languages ==
- English
- Afrikaans
- Xhosa

== Broadcast time ==
- 24/7

== Target audience ==
- Youth market (Age Group: 16 - 35)

== Programme format ==
- 60% Music
- 40% Talk

== Listenership figures ==
Estimated Listenership
	7 Day
Feb 2013	36 000
Dec 2012	35 000
Oct 2012	35 000
Aug 2012	37 000
Jun 2012	32 000
