= Univates =

Brazilian university

University of Taquari Valley
- Universidade do Vale do Taquari
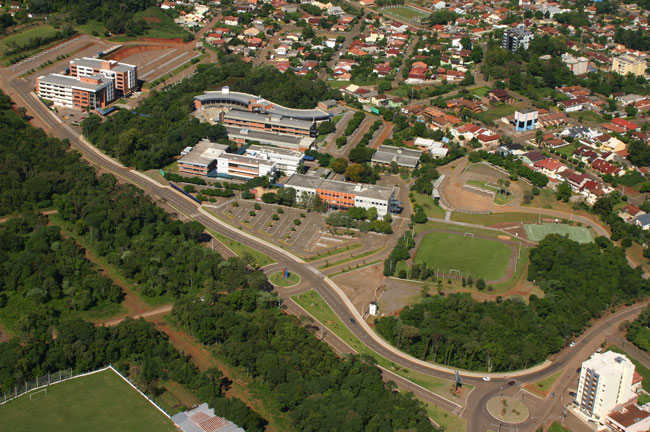
- Type: Community, private non-profit
- Established: January 7, 1969
- Rector: Ney José Lazzari
- Academic staff: 537
- Students: 13,235 (2015)
- Location: Lajeado (headquarters) and Encantado, Rio Grande do Sul, Brazil
- Campus: Urban
- Colors: Blue and Orange
- Website: www.univates.br

The University of Taquari Valley (UNIVATES, Portuguese: Universidade do Vale do Taquari) is a private research university based in Lajeado, state of Rio Grande do Sul, Brazil. It currently has 13,235 students. As of 2011, it had 404 full-time teaching staff. It offers 45 courses on the undergraduate level, 4 on the master's level and one on the doctorate (PhD) level, also counting with 28 research projects, mainly on the areas of biology, food technology and biotechnology.

The institution has over 109 laboratories, a start-up incubator, a culture center, a hydro-meteorological information center, a Natural Science museum, a radio and TV station and an olympic stadium. In May 2014 it opened a cultural center, with a library and a theater for 1150 people.

In 2013 Univates scored as the 4th best private university center (medium-sized higher education institutions) in Brazil according to MEC's General Courses Index (IGC). Considering both private university centers and private universities, Univates ranks as the 3rd best in South Brazil and 7th in Brazil, among the country's top 3.8% private higher education institutions. In 2015, CAPES selected a Univates project for research and innovation on Teacher Education along with 9 other in the whole country, with a grant of approximately R$1,700.000.

A 2005 study showed that the institution has a significant impact on the economics of the city of Lajeado and the Vale do Taquari region, providing respectively 3.36% and 0.97% of the total workplaces in that year.
