= Hugh Corder =

- Born: 27 July 1954 (age 72)
- Education: University of Cape Town; University of Cambridge; University of Oxford
- Children: 5, including Dan

Hugh Corder is an emeritus professor in the Faculty of Law at the University of Cape Town. He served as UCT's youngest and longest-serving Chair of Public Law from 1987 to 2020.

== Early life and education ==
Hugh Corder attended Diocesan College in Cape Town before graduating with a BCom LLB from the University of Cape Town in 1977. While at university he had volunteered with the Border Council of Churches who were working with displaced black communities who were being resettled in Dimbaza in the former Ciskei. While visiting the area Corder met Steve Biko and other members of the Black Consciousness Movement. He was also involved in UCT student politics acting as president of the Law Students' Council and running a campaign on legal aid for NUSAS. In 1978 he won a Kramer Grant to the University of Cambridge where he did a postgraduate degree by coursework. The following year he took up a Rhodes Scholarship at the University of Oxford to pursue doctoral research on the role and attitudes of South Africa's appellate judiciary, from 1910 to 1950.

== Academic career ==
On Corder's return to South Africa he was offered a post at Stellenbosch University. He was then appointed UCT's Chair of Public Law from 1987 to 2020. In 1993 Corder was asked to join the technical committee that drafted the first Bill of Rights. He has been a Fellow of the University of Cape Town since 2004. He served two terms as dean of Law at UCT from 1999 to 2008, and in addition served as interim deputy vice-chancellor in 2016-2017 and interim director of the Graduate School of Business in 2020. He was a fellow at the Bingham Centre for the Rule of Law. He is a board member of Freedom Under Law, an NGO that uses litigation to defend the Rule of Law and democracy in South Africa. He also served as a member of the UCT Trust Board of Trustees since 2010.

== Personal life ==
Hugh Corder is married to Catherine Corder, a retired academic. They have five children. His son is Dan Corder, political commentator and social media content creator.

== Publications ==
Publications by Corder include:

- Judges at Work (1984)
- Essays on Law and Social Practice (1988) (ed)
- "Crowbars and Cobwebs: Executive Autocracy and the Law in South Africa" (1989) 5 SAJHR 1
- Empowerment and Accountability (1991)
- Understanding South Africa's Transitional Bill of Rights (1994) (with Lourens du Plessis)
- "Towards a South African Bill of Rights" (1994) 57 Modern law Review 491–5
- "The Constitutionalisation of South African Administrative Law" (1997)3 European Public law 541–559
- "Administrative Justice: A Cornerstone of South Africa's Democracy" (1998) 14 SAJHR 38–5
- "From Separation to Unity: Accommodating Difference in South Africa's Constitutions during the twentieth century" (2000) 10 Transnational law and Contemporary Problems 539-559
- "From Prisoner to Patriarch: Transforming the Law in South Africa, 1985-2000" (2001) 118 SALJ 772–793
- "Judicial Authority in a Changing South Africa" 2004 Legal Studies 232–253
- "Judicial Activism of a Special Type: South Africa's Top Courts since 1994" in Brice Dickson(Ed) Judicial Activism in Common Law Supreme Courts (2007) 323–362
- "Judicial Accountability" in Hoexter and Olivier The Judiciary in South Africa (2014) 200–244.
- The Quest for Constitutionalism (2014) (co-ed)
- Hugh Corder and Jan van Zyl Smit (eds), Securing Judicial Independence: The Role of Commissions in Selecting Judges in the Commonwealth (Siber Ink, 2017)
