= Lajeado, Rio Grande do Sul =

Municipality of Rio Grande do Sul, Brazil

Lajeado
- Municipality
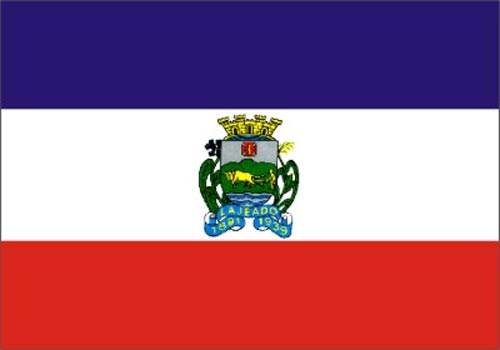
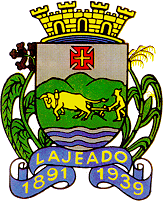
- Flag Coat of arms

- Location within Rio Grande do Sul

- Location in Brazil
- Coordinates: 29°28′01″S 51°57′39″W
- Country: Brazil
- State: Rio Grande do Sul

Government
  - Mayor: Gláucia Schumacher (2025-2028)

Area
  - Total: 90.09 km^{2} (34.78 sq mi)
- Elevation: 32 m (105 ft)

Population (2022)
  - Total: 97,432
  - Density: 1,081/km^{2} (2,801/sq mi)
- Time zone: UTC−3 (BRT)
- Postal code: 95900-000
- Area code: 51
- Website: lajeado.rs.gov.br

Lajeado is an important city in the valley of the Taquari River, Rio Grande do Sul, Brazil. The population is 97,432 (2022 est.) in an area of 90.09 km^{2}. Some of the largest distributors of food and fuel of the state are found in Lajeado. The city is mostly urban. Its current mayor is Gláucia Schumacher. It was founded on January 26, 1891, when it was separated from the municipality of Estrela. It was colonized by German and Italian people.

The city has a university: Univates.

== Notable people ==
- Pedrinho Gaúcho, football player
- Rodrigo Ely, football player
- Marcel Stürmer, artistic roller skater

== See also ==
- List of municipalities in Rio Grande do Sul
