= University of Passo Fundo =

Brazilian private university

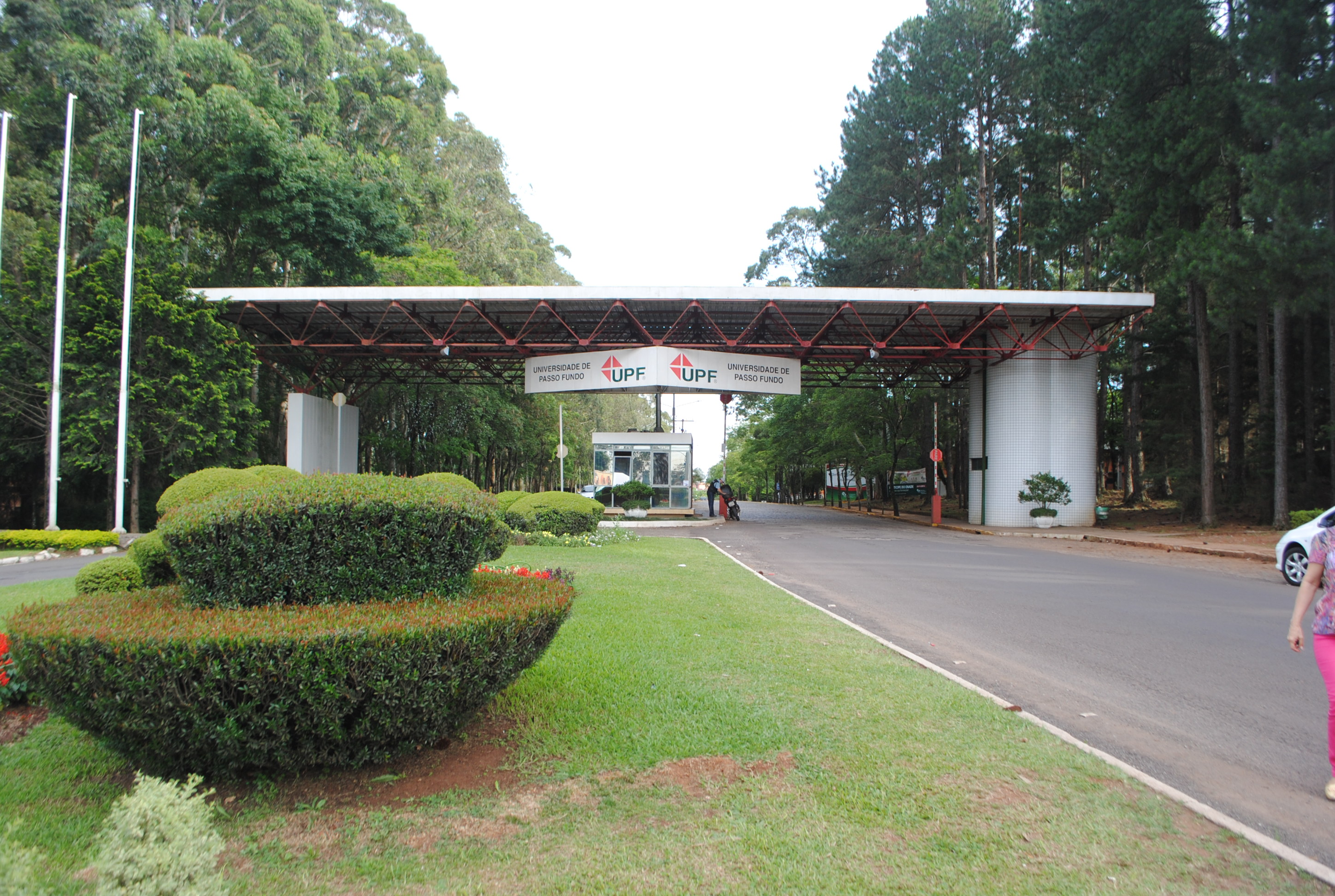
University of Passo Fundo, main entrance

The University of Passo Fundo (Portuguese: Universidade de Passo Fundo), also known as UPF, is a Brazilian private university. Founded in 1968, it is located in the city of Passo Fundo, in the state of Rio Grande do Sul. It has about 20,000 students as of 2016.
