= Society for Elimination of Rural Poverty =

Indian state organization in Andhra Pradesh

Society for Elimination of Rural Poverty (SERP)
- Type: Development Organisation
- Headquarters: Vijayawada, Andhra Pradesh, India
- Area served: Rural Areas of Andhra Pradesh
- Key people: Women, Rural Poor
- Parent: Government of Andhra Pradesh
- Website: www.serp.ap.gov.in

Society for Elimination of Rural Poverty (SERP) is an autonomous society of the Department of Rural Development, Government of Andhra Pradesh. SERP is implementing Indira Kranthi Patham (IKP), a statewide community driven rural poverty reduction project to enable the poor to improve their livelihoods and quality of life through their own organizations. It aims to cover all the rural poor households in the state with a special focus on the poorest of the poor households. SERP also played an active part in the relief efforts taken up by the Andhra Pradesh Government during the devastating Indian Ocean tsunami in 2004.

== Vision Statement of IKP ==
The disadvantaged communities shall be empowered to overcome all social, economic, cultural and psychological barriers through self-managed organizations. They will attain higher productivity with improved skills and asset base and utilize resources to full potential and gainful access to services.

== Internal organizational structure ==
SERP is registered under the Societies (Telangana) Act, chaired by the chief minister as the ex officio chairman of the General Body (GB). This body has broad representation from key stakeholders, government and NGOs. The General Body consists of twenty-five members, with five ex officio government officials and twenty representing leading agencies and individuals contributing to rural development, community mobilization and poverty alleviation.

The management of SERP is entrusted to an executive committee (EC), of which an eminent non-governmental person is president and the state project director is the chief executive officer (CEO). The president of EC is the vice chairperson of the GB. The EC consists of seven members with three ex officio government officials and four drawn from the civil society.

== SHG movement in Andhra Pradesh ==
The Self Help Group (SHG) movement in India represents an innovative approach to financial intermediation, and combines access to low-cost financial services with a process of self-management and development for the SHG members. SHG members make small regular savings contributions, and use the savings to lend to group members. IKP also establishes SHGs as financial intermediaries between SHG members and banks, which gives the members access to bank loans.

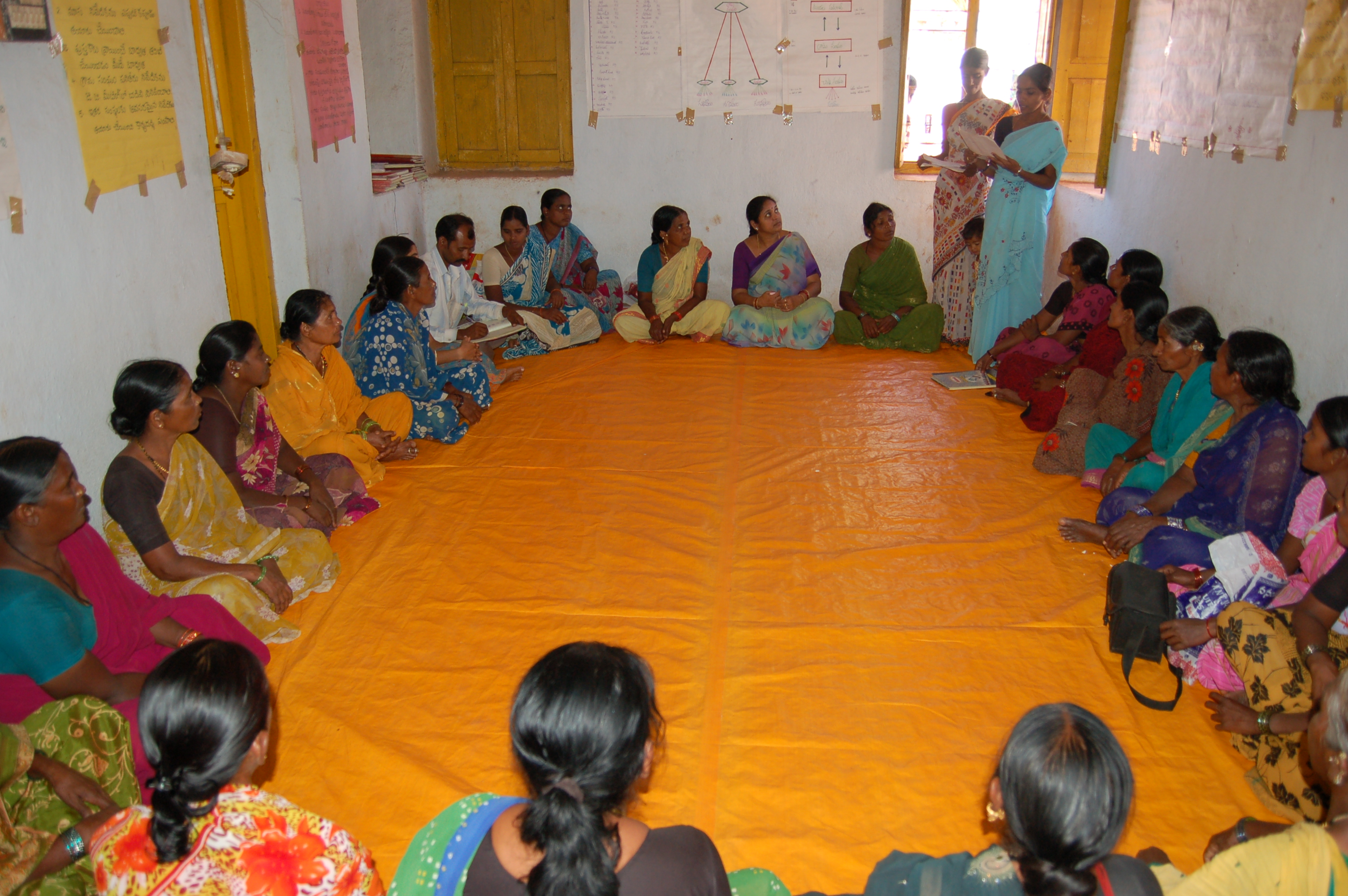
Women at SHG Meeting

Through IKP, SERP works with 4,76,930 Self Help Groups federated into 28,080 Village Organizations (VO) and 700 Mandal Samakhyas (MS) with the primary obligation to build strong institutions for the poor and enhance their livelihood opportunities.

A 2009 study found a significant economic impact for long-term SHG participants, including poorest of the poor participants. According to the study, 2.5-3 year exposure to the program leads to increased consumption, improved nutrition, and asset accumulation.

== Functional Areas of SERP ==
SERP’s mandate to eradicate the rural poverty in Andhra Pradesh is achieved through improvement in various functional areas that have been deemed important for the poor to break the shackles of poverty. Each of these functional areas caters to poverty elimination in its own unique way through providing livelihood opportunities, financial assistance for setting up businesses, health related benefits etc.

=== Women empowerment ===
The ability of women to have access and control over assets, incomes and various other services available at village and individual level has been the basic outline of SERP’s Gender strategy. It has long been understood that Women Empowerment can go a long way in making equitable development a reality. The Gender programme of SERP helps women to increase their understanding of intra-family equity issues, decision making levels, free mobility, and the necessity of building a safe environment.

=== Land Access to the Poor ===
Land represents a fundamental asset to the rural families in India as it is a primary source of income, security, and status. Since its independence, the Government of India has taken up several land reforms as a part of its National Agenda. The Land component of SERP works in two directions: Land Purchase i.e. securing the poor access to productive lands through allowing purchase of good quality irrigated lands, and Land Access i.e. facilitating the poor to have control over their lands in terms of having secure title, handling their lands locked in courts/disputes, awareness as to the measures taken by the Government to protect the interests of the poor manifested in the form of pro-poor enactments etc.

=== SHG Bank Linkage ===
The SHG Bank Linkage programme was launched in the 1990s by NABARD. It's a nationwide effort with the largest presence in the southern states including Andhra Pradesh. As of 2008, 37.5% of all SHG Bank Linkage loans were made to borrowers in Andhra Pradesh. The program expands credit lines to SHG members by linking SHGs with banks. While banks have the necessary resources, they may be reluctant to lend to poor individuals who lack collateral. SHG Bank Linkage programme makes provisions for that. To qualify for a bank loan, SHGs need to show commitment to financial responsibility through regular meetings, consistent savings, and good management of the loans they make from their own savings. This process reduces the risk of defaults. Facilitated by NABARD, SERP has been largely successful in providing the rural poor with access to loans resulting in the SHGs scaling up their operations.

=== Community Managed Sustainable Agriculture (CMSA) ===
The CMSA department of SERP works on ecological alternatives in agriculture which make best use of local resources and encourage the farmers to reduce the use chemical pesticides. This is done through advocating Non-pesticide Management (NPM) of insect pests. The poor are encouraged to adopt sustainable agriculture practices to reduce the costs of cultivations thus increasing net incomes. Other major causes of agricultural distress among the rural farmers in India such as displaced local knowledge, unsustainable agricultural practices like monocropping and imperfect markets are also addressed.

=== Institution building ===
This segment works at building Community Based Organisations (CBOs) that aim to bring together the poor women and assist them to work collectively towards sustainable development. These CBOs; Zilla Samakhyas at district level, Mandal Samakhyas at mandal level, Village Organisations at village level and SHGs at the group level, form the basic structure on which the foundations for the growth of rural poor are laid.

=== Stree Nidhi ===
SthreeNidhi credit cooperative Federation Ltd., is promoted by the Government and the MandalSamkahyas to supplement credit flow from banking sector and is a flagship programme of the Government. SthreeNidhi provides timely and affordable credit to the poor SHG members as a part of the overall strategy of SERP for poverty alleviation. SHGs are comfortable to access hassle free credit from SthreeNidhi as and when required using their mobile and therefore do not see any need to borrow from other sources at usurious rates of interest. SthreeNidhi is in a position to extend credit to the SHGs even in far flung areas of the state in 48 hours to meet credit needs for exigencies like health, education and other income generation needs like agriculture, dairy and other activities. As credit availability is linked to grading of MS and VOs, community is keen to improve functioning of the same to access higher amount of credit limits from SthreeNidhi.
