= SURG =

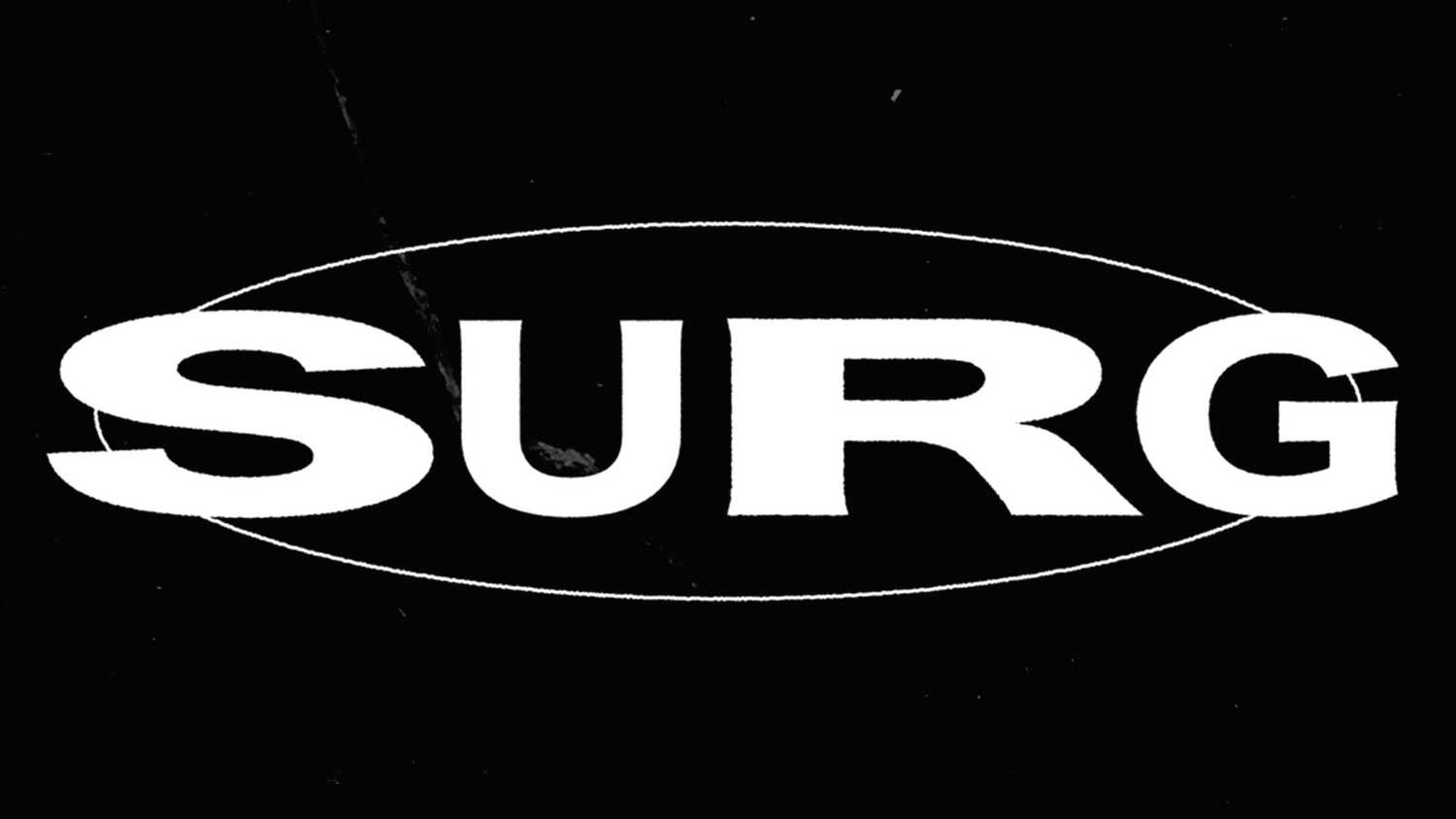
- Sydney; Australia
- Broadcast area: University of Sydney

Programming
- Format: Online broadcast
- Affiliations: Community Broadcasting Association of Australia

Ownership
- Owner: University of Sydney Union

History
- First air date: August 23, 2011
- Former call signs: 2SUX, 2USU
- Former frequencies: 90.9FM
- Call sign meaning: Sydney University Radio Group

Links
- Website: surgfm.com

SURG, previously styled as SURG FM, is the campus radio station of the University of Sydney. The station is run entirely by students as an initiative of the University of Sydney Union, and broadcasts online through the iHeartRadio platform. SURG stands for the 'Sydney University Radio Group'. SURG showcases a diverse array of music and shows, allowing students to create their own programming.

SURG's studio are located in the Holme Building on Science Road. Notably broadcasters have interviewed the likes of André Aciman, Matt Okine & Nick Lutsko.

== History ==
Student radio groups have existed on the University of Sydney campus since the 1920s.

In 1924 Major E. H. Booth, then President of the Sydney University Union, founded the Radio Club, with Professor J. P. V. Madsen as president. Holding lectures on subjects such as ‘The Fundamentals of Broadcasting’, ‘The Nature of Wireless Waves & Methods of Broadcasting’, ‘Broadcasting & Reception’, and ‘Commercial Wireless’, the club had 30 members and averaged 4 members at their weekly events.

Madsen proposed in 1926 that their studies should continue under a ‘Radio Research Board’ within the Council for Scientific and Industrial Research (CSIR – now the CSIRO), which was founded the same year. The CSIR would build the first National Standards Laboratory in Australia – what is now the Madsen Building.

In the late 1970s, University Broadcasting Services, running from the Wentworth building, created content and recorded lectures for 2SER. When further community radio licenses were made available to Sydney stations, the USU Society, ‘Sydney University Friends of the Radio Station’, was formed to conduct test broadcasts and lobby for a campus station, under the name 2SUX. After a General Meeting of the USU attracted 30 people – 21 voting for and 9 against the bid, the USU withdraw its support of the society's bid as it was believed not an economically feasible investment at the time.

Radio Skid Row-Radio Redfern took over the Wentworth studio until being kicked out in June 1984. University Broadcasting Services, now FBi Radio, was granted a lease to use the space under the Footbridge Theatre in the mid-90s, and moved briefly to the Wentworth studio before leaving for a Pitt St Mall shopfront, and then finally moving to their current home in Waterloo in the early 2000s.

At the same time, William Balfour created the Sydney University Radio Group. When FBi left campus, SURG applied for a Temporary Community Broadcast License, broadcasting twice a year from Manning House or a caravan in front of the Quadrangle: for a week during O-Week, and for two weeks during Verge Festival in October. The license was owned by the USU and thus the station was formally ‘USUFM’, used interchangeably with ‘SURG FM’.

In late 2010, after renovations to the Holme Building radio studio, SURG began to use that space for its broadcast periods, broadcasting from the university's own FM transmitter on top of Fisher Library.

In Semester 2 2012, SURG launched its online broadcast, broadcasting on weekdays for 10 weeks of each semester. This coincided with a Memorandum of Understanding with the USU, noting that SURG provides a service outside the scope of most clubs and societies, and thus receives special funding.

In Semester 1 2017, SURG launched on iHeartRadio, ‘Australia’s leading online entertainment platform’, appearing next to radio stations from Australian Radio Network (ARN) and national broadcasters.

In Semester 1 2022, the SURG studio and website underwent major renovations in preparation for students' return to campus after the pandemic.

== Notable alumni ==
- "Michael Koziol - Journalist". smh.com.au.

== Current structure ==
SURG is run as a club within the University of Sydney Union. This means it is independent but relies on funding from the Union's Clubs & Societies Program, of up to $6000 per annum.

SURG is run by a student executive, elected at the end of each academic year.
