= John A. Corder =

United States Air Force general

- Born: August 28, 1939 (age 87); Salem, Oregon
- Military career
- Allegiance: United States of America
- Branch: United States Air Force
- Service years: 1959–1992
- Rank: Major general
- Commands: Tactical Air Warfare Center; 65th Air Division; 3rd Tactical Fighter Wing
- Conflicts: Vietnam War; Gulf War
- Awards: Air Force Cross; Air Force Distinguished Service Medal (3); Defense Superior Service Medal; Legion of Merit; Distinguished Flying Cross

General John A. Corder (born 28 August 1939) is a retired United States Air Force (USAF) Major general.

== Early life and education ==
Corder was born in Salem, Oregon, in 1939, and graduated from high school in Albany, Oregon, in 1957. He earned a bachelor's degree in business administration from the University of Nebraska–Lincoln in 1970 and a master's degree in business administration from Auburn University in 1971.

== Military career ==
He entered the USAF in March 1959. He received his commission and navigator wings through the aviation cadet program at Harlingen Air Force Base, Texas, in April 1960. After completing B-52 upgrade training at Mather Air Force Base, California and survival training at Stead Air Force Base, Nevada, he was assigned as a B-52 navigator with the 7th Bombardment Wing, Carswell Air Force Base, Texas, in January 1961. In March 1964 he entered pilot training at Reese Air Force Base, Texas, and upon graduation in April 1965, was assigned to the 33rd Tactical Fighter Wing, Eglin Air Force Base, as an F-4 Phantom II pilot.

He then served in the Tactical branch, 8th Tactical Fighter Wing, Ubon Royal Thai Air Force Base, Thailand, from May 1967 to March 1968. During this tour of duty, he flew 250 combat hours (140 sorties, including 100 missions over North Vietnam) in the F-4D. On 8 February 1968 he led a two-aircraft low-level attack on Phúc Yên Air Base; his F-4 was hit by antiaircraft fire and he and his radar intercept officer, Captain Tracy K. Dorsett, ejected over Laos, where they evaded enemy forces before being rescued by USAF helicopters. Corder and Dorsett were each awarded the Air Force Cross for this mission.

He then was assigned to Nellis Air Force Base, Nevada, serving in the Fighter Concepts and Doctrine Division of the Tactical Fighter Weapons Center.

Upon graduation from Air Command and Staff College in August 1971, he was assigned as an action officer in the Fighter Tactics Branch of the Tactical Division, Office of the Deputy Chief of Staff for Operations, Headquarters U.S. Air Force, Washington, D.C. In August 1974 he entered the National War College. After graduating in June 1975, he was assigned as chief of requirements, plans and programs, in the Air Force section of the Joint U.S. Military Assistance Mission to Turkey.

From August 1976 to July 1978 Corder was base commander at Nellis Air Force Base. He then became deputy commander for operations and commandant of the Fighter Weapons School within the 57th Fighter Weapons Wing, also at Nellis. He transferred to Headquarters Pacific Air Forces, Hickam Air Force Base, Hawaii, in March 1979 as director of tactical operations. In October 1979 he was named director of inspection for the Pacific Air Forces inspector general team. He was appointed vice commander of the 3rd Tactical Fighter Wing, Clark Air Force Base, Philippines, in August 1980 and became commander in February 1981. He was assigned as commander of the Defense Supply Center, Richmond, Virginia, in August 1983.

In June 1985 he returned to USAF headquarters as director of electronic combat in the Office of the Deputy Chief of Staff, Research, Development and Acquisition. He was assigned as commander of the 65th Air Division, USAF in Europe's Electronic Combat Air Division, Lindsey Air Station, West Germany, in August 1987. In April 1988 he was promoted to major general and became deputy chief of staff for operations, Headquarters USAF in Europe, Ramstein Air Base, West Germany. He assumed command of the USAF Tactical Air Warfare Center, Eglin Air Force Base, Florida in January 1989.

From November 1990 until March 1991 he was deputy commander of operations for the Central Command Air Forces in the Persian Gulf. He was responsible for the planning and execution of 2,500 to 3,000 sorties per day during Operation Desert Storm. This involved approximately 2,400 USAF, Navy and Marine Corps aircraft, plus aircraft from nine other allied nations.

== Retirement and later life ==
He retired from the Air Force on 1 September 1992.
