= XFM (Denmark) =

Denmark
- Frequencies: 107.4 MHz in Lyngby, 95.5 MHz in Copenhagen

Programming
- Format: College radio

Ownership
- Owner: The organisations XFM Lyngby and XFM Copenhagen

History
- First air date: February 1987

Links
- Website: http://xfm.dk

XFM is a student radio of Technical University of Denmark. It is run mostly by student volunteers.

The station consists of two organisations, XFM Lyngby and XFM København, which broadcast on the frequencies 107.4 MHz and 95.5 MHz in Lyngby and Copenhagen, respectively.

It was founded in February 1987 with support from the student association at DTU, Polyteknisk Forening and the dormitories around DTU. Originally it was called Radio Radiator, but soon changed its name to Radio NRG and later to XFM. XFM is also formally known as "De Ingeniørstuderendes Lokalradio i Lyngby-Taarbæk" (The engineering students' local radio in Lyngby-Taarbæk).

== General information ==
The station is run by volunteers, but has in most of the time in its history employed one or two persons for administrative work. Most of the volunteers are current or former students at DTU, but some come from other universities in the area. The station also attracts foreign students, some of whom make weekly shows for several years.

The station broadcasts hourly news, which are updated daily, about DTU, news related to engineering and weather reports.

== Music profile ==
The station mostly has rock, alternative and indie music on the rotation. The different shows in the afternoon and evening are mostly themed for a particular genre, some of which are electronica, industrial, reggae, drum'n'bass and heavy metal.

== Reception area ==
The 107.4 antenna is situated in the southwestern corner of DTU and transmits at 160 watts. It can be picked up with a good receiver in Ballerup, Hellerup and central Copenhagen. Good reception in Skåne has also been reported by a radio amateur.

The 95.5 antenna is placed in the middle of Copenhagen, also transmits at 160 watts and can be received in most of the suburbs.

== Broadcast schedule ==
Since the station shares its two frequencies with other parties, the broadcasting hours are restricted to the schedules below:

107.4 MHz

Time	Mon	Sat	Wed	Thu	Fri
06:00-08:30					
16:00-17:30	X	X	X	X	X
18:30-00:00	X	X	X	X	

95.5 MHz

Mon-Fri
05:00-08:30
11:30-16:00
