= Rhodes Music Radio =

South African radio station

Rhodes Music Radio, or RMR as it is more commonly known, is the campus radio station of Rhodes University. It was also the first non-State broadcaster in South Africa's history to be allowed to broadcast legally. The pioneering broadcasts of RMR's FESTIVAL FM were reported worldwide in 1991 as global media highlighted this 'first breaking' of the half-century monopoly on broadcasting exercised by the South African Broadcasting Corporation (SABC).

== History ==
The station was formed in 1981, at which point it broadcast only across Grahamstown's Rhodes University campus. One of the founding music presenters at the station, David O'Sullivan, is today one of South Africa's most respected radio talk show hosts as a presenter on Talk Radio 702. Another notable personality to emerge from RMR's early days includes South African television and radio personality Jeremy Mansfield.

More recently the station has produced a string of household names in South African television, radio and journalism including former CNN sports presenter Graeme Joffe, 5FM DJs Nicole Fox, Jon Savage and Mlungisi Dikulu, SABC news and talk presenter Sherwin Bryce-Pease, SuperSport presenter Leigh-Ann Paulick, Talk Radio 702 and Daily Maverick reporter Stephen Grootes. Recently the station compiled a more complete list of its alumni, available on its website.

== Timeline ==
1981: RMR begins narrowcasting to the Rhodes cafeteria on 1 August, later expanding to the residences on campus.

1987: 16 University residences linked to the narrowcasting system.

1988: Test transmissions of Rhodes Educational Radio (RER) introduced.

1990: 5 RMR presenters (the wider team included Station Manager Alex McGowan, Reuben Goldberg, Andrew Bolton, Kyle Hannan and Tove Kane) set a record for non-stop broadcasting by a campus station (336 hours). The last minutes are broadcast live on Capital Radio.

1990: Breakfast presenter Kyle Hannan wins national campus DJ competition at the Camel Pyramid of Light in Johannesburg's Ellis Park stadium (just ahead of Mark Gillman who later went on to national fame on national pop station 5FM).

1991, June: RMR granted permission to broadcast in conjunction with Radio 5 at the Grahamstown Festival of Arts (10-day temporary licence for a station named "Festival-FM"). Broadcasting took place on 89.7 MHz FM for a 15-kilometer radius, with the target audience being visitors to the Festival as well as Grahamstown residents. The licence was the first of its kind in South Africa and broke the SABC's half century long monopoly on legal broadcasting. Station Manager at the time was Kyle Hannan.

1992, August: RER becomes Rhodes Topical Radio.

1993, March: RMR broadcasts the last nine days of a marathon record breaking attempt in aid of Child Welfare. Breaking the record set by RMR in 1990, 5 presenters broadcast around the clock for a total of 17 days (394 hours). Target audience for the last nine days is the entire Grahamstown community. Frequency and range: 88 MHz, 15 km radius.

1993, June: Festival FM broadcasts again, on the same frequency and range, during the National Arts Festival.

1994, February/March: RMR is one of 15 stations granted a temporary broadcast licence. Frequency and range: 88 MHz, 15 km radius.

1994, June: RMR's application for a temporary licence to broadcast during the National Arts Festival is rejected by the Independent Broadcast Authority (IBA).

1995, March: RMR successfully applies to the IBA for a temporary, one-year community licence.

1995, May 17: RMR takes to the airwaves 24 hours a day as a fully fledged community broadcaster.

1995, August: Rhodes Topical Radio (RTR) is integrated into RMR, as the RMR Talk department.

1996, February: RMR successfully applies to the IBA for a temporary, one-year community licence. 1997, February: RMR successfully applies to the IBA for a temporary, one-year community licence.

1998, January: RMR applies to the IBA for a permanent, four-year licence. The station is granted a temporary, one-year community licence, pending the four-year licence hearings.

1999, February: RMR successfully applies to the IBA for a temporary, one-year community licence.

2000, April: Following a hearing by the IBA, RMR is finally granted its first four-year licence.

2002, February: An initiative started by former Station Managers' Marisa Dean, Adelé Mostert and Sean Bosman sees the employment of RMR's first Full Time Station Manager - Mike Smurthwaite.

2002, February 8: RMR hosts a 101-hour DJ marathon as a fundraising effort for local charities, a simultaneous broadcast happens, RMR is heard live on Radio 702 for 15 min.

2004, August: RMR successfully renews its four community broadcasting license. 2005, September: RMR receives the Best Provincial Performer for 2004/2005 from the Department of Communications of South Africa in respect of the community radio Programme Production Project.

2006, June: RMR, in part sponsored by the university and the Government Department of Communications, spends R750,000 on a facilities upgrade. The station's new studios and offices are located in the same venue at the Student Union building.

2006, September: RMR's breakfast DJ Robin Stuart Vember attempts to set a new world record for the longest continuous radio broadcast by a single DJ. He breaks the South African record of 55 hours and then goes on to claim an unofficial world record, with a final time of 126 hours and 15 minutes on air (Guinness World Record authorities are still yet to make the record official). In the closing days of Vember's attempts, the station broadcasts simultaneously with Talk Radio 702 in Johannesburg on two occasions, as Vember speaks to former RMR presenter, and now 702 stalwart, David O'Sullivan.

== Recent events ==
In August 2006 the station marked its 25th birthday with the opening of its new R750,000 studio, office and production facilities, making it quite possibly the best equipped campus radio station in the country.

The next month, as part of the 25th birthday celebrations, RMR breakfast DJ Robin Vember attempted to beat the Guinness World Record for the longest continuous radio broadcast. Vember broadcast between 07h00 on Monday 18 September 2006 and 13h15 on Saturday 23 September 2006, beating the previous record by just over an hour. The record attempt is yet to receive official confirmation by Guinness authorities.
