= AstraSat =

South African satellite television service

AstraSat was the South African Broadcasting Corporation's satellite television service that existed between 1996 and 1998. AstraSat carried SABC's three terrestrial television networks and two additional free-to-air channels that were aimed at becoming subscription channels. Numerous factors including the reliance on analogue instead of digital led to its closure in February 1998.

== History ==
In November 1995, talks mooted between the SABC and Channel 4 for the provision not only of its three networks (TV1, CCV and NNTV) in the clear by satellite, but also for the creation of eight subscription networks during 1996. At the same time, the three SABC channels were made available over the PAS-4 satellite. Channel 4 announced in January 1996 that it would operate the fourth channel of the platform, aiming for the eight-channel goal in July.

In December 1995, it was announced that the SABC would operate its satellite television service using analogue technology, in opposition to the newly launched DStv, which was entirely digital. The SABC said that digital technology didn't match the profile of a South African consumer. Neil Smuts of Sentech said that analogue television gave viewers a "reliable, quality image" with the goal of reaching out to the highest number of South Africans possible. Multichoice wasn't favouring the SABC's decision, especially with then-ongoing trends in Europe regarding the phasing out of analogue satellite technologies.

AstraSat launched on 4 July 1996 with broadcasts formally starting on 15 July. Initially there were two channels available, AstraPlus and AstraSport. The SABC's plan was to encrypt these channels from 1 December and launch six more channels to the platform: a movie channel, a sports channel supplied by M-Net's SuperSport, a music channel, a 24-hour news channel, a general entertainment channel showing previews of SABC dramas as well as a high amount of foreign content and a family entertainment channel. An Afrikaans language package was stipulated to cost R35 a month, while the six non-premium channels would cost R120 a month.

The service was transmitted over the PAS-4 satellite, and, once the PAS-7 satellite was ready to orbit in October 1997, it would be joined by six further analogue channels. These predictions paled to DStv, which had a 36-channel line-up projected for 1996.

Following the launch of the two free-to-air channels in July, it was announced in September that the encryption of the services wasn't viable until March or April 1997. At launch, AstraSat planned to add SuperSport, and had also negotiated with Multichoice to use the Irdeto encryption method. Following its launch, Multichoice announced that it wouldn't license SuperSport to AstraSat and did not own the rights to the encryption method AstraSat wanted to use. Discussions at the SABC said that if the encrypted service would go live in December, it wouldn't include SuperSport. With the possibility of using PAS-7 from October 1997, it would have had a larger footprint as north as Zaire and would amend its programming to match African audiences.

By early February 1997, the idea of a six-channel subscription package was "revised". In March it was announced that "major progress" has been made for the composition of the subscription package. This depended on partners which the SABC sought after to produce and air content. AstraSat had interim content available for six channels. At the same time, it was announced that AstraSport and AstraPlus would remain free-to-air for "the next couple of months". By August, the SABC was considering scrapping the service. As indecision was plaguing the service, the plans to make AstraSat a subscription service wouldn't move ahead in mid-June 1997.

On 11 February 1998, the SABC announced that it would discontinue AstraSat effective 28 February. An SABC spokesman said that both AstraSport and AstraPlus would be put on hold "until there is more clarity in broadcasting".

== Channels ==
- AstraSport broadcast for four hours a day on average, with a fixed opening time of 19:00 and ending around 23:00. Most of the output consisted of niche sporting events, mostly recorded, with limited cricket and soccer. During the channels's first few weeks on air, it carried content related to the 1996 Summer Olympics.
- AstraPlus was the general entertainment channel. Broadcasting from 13:00 to around midnight, programming included Pulse, Donahue, content from E!, a children's programming block called Cool+ (from 15:00 to 18:00 on weekdays) and a prime time slot called Prime+ (daily, from 18:00 or later to closedown) with some television series and feature films.
- While not a channel in its own right, AstraShop was broadcast between 2 and 3pm on AstraPlus, carrying infomercials.

== Criticism ==
Criticism of AstraSat was highly negative. After much anticipation in its launch campaign, viewers started noting frequent technical problems on its channels. The first night according to The Star was plagued by fuzzy reception and unused mono frequencies. The feature films selected for AstraPlus were touted as being "antique". Gert Claassen, Chief Executive of AstraSat, said that as of late July 1996, it was the only time the service reported such difficulties, having maintained a good picture and audio quality.

Its reliance on analogue instead of digital also let AstraSat in a bad state, but the SABC had considered launching a digital service if they had the means. Advertisers also refused to negotiate with its channels.

== Aftermath ==
It was announced in late 1998 that the SABC was going to phase out the old AstraSat system in a two-year window. Coupled with the decision were the conversion of the SABC channels to digital, tasked by Sentech, and the launch of its terrestrial networks on the DStv platform. Rob Stevenson of the SABC said in September 1998 that analogue turned out to be expensive for the broadcaster, giving advantage to the digital system, which has the capacity of carrying more channels. AstraSat subscribers were given subsidies to join DStv. The digitalisation efforts cost three million rand. Details of the switchover would be announced closer to the end of the period.

Sentech announced the end of AstraSat on 9 September 1998 and announced the creation of a digital replacement, Sentech Vivid, aimed at AstraSat users that didn't want to join DStv.

The SABC announced that the analogue satellite signals once used by AstraSat would finally shut down on 31 October 2000. These broadcasts were also received in neighbouring countries, as compensation, DStv Select was created, with SABC's two international services, SABC Africa and Africa2Africa, being on the six-channel offer. The signals for the SABC channels began to switch off on 11 September 2000, with SABC 3 becoming the first channel to do so. The shutdown phase had negative effects in Swaziland, where these channels (namely SABC 1 and SABC 3) were preferred over the state channel Swazi TV, which was seen as underdeveloped compared to the South African channels.
