= Television in Eswatini =

Television was introduced to Eswatini (at the time Swaziland) in 1978. Initially it was a private company owned by the Swaziland Television Broadcasting Corporation, five years later, it was taken over by the Swaziland Broadcasting and Information Service being put under state influence. There are only two local television channels, the state-run Eswatini TV (formerly Swazi TV) and the privately owned Channel Yemaswati (formerly Channel S).

== History ==
The Swaziland Television Broadcasting Company (STBC) was established in 1977 as a small private company that was owned by British electronic firms, with the government holding 10% of its shares. It started broadcasting on 1 February 1978, being opened by King Sobhuza II. The passing of the Swaziland Television Act on 1 April 1983 put STBC under state control and was renamed Swazi TV. Its signal was received via spillover in adjacent parts of South Africa.

Until 2001, Swazi TV held a de jure monopoly on television transmissions. Viewers could easily pick up SABC television transmissions within Swaziland's borders and, by the 1990s, SBIS had an SABC relay transmitter. This was halted in 1997 as they feared that the SABC's coverage of the strikes in mid-October, which was more open than Swazi TV's, could lead to misunderstanding, with some believing the causes to be political. Gradually, from 2000, the SABC signals on the ill-fated AstraSat service were being switched off, which was proven to be a blow for locals because they thought that Swazi TV was an inferior service.

Ultimate Television Productions (Ultipro) broke Swazi TV's 23-year monopoly with the opening of the first private television channel, Channel S, in March 2001. Private in nature, it has been accused by the Media Institute for Southern Africa for serving the king of Swaziland. The channel operated without a license as of 2009.

With the renaming of Swaziland to Eswatini in 2018, the channel names changed: Swazi TV became Eswatini TV, while Channel S became Channel Yemaswati. The import of analogue television sets and digital sets that don't have the DVB-T2 standard was forbidden from 1 June 2025.
