= Africa2Africa =

- Country: South Africa
- Broadcast area: Africa
- Network: SABC
- Headquarters: SABC Television Park, Uitsaaisentrum, Johannesburg, South Africa

Programming
- Language: English
- Picture format: 4:3 SDTV

Ownership
- Owner: South African Broadcasting Corporation
- Sister channels: SABC 1 SABC 2 SABC 3 SABC Africa

History
- Launched: 1999; 27 years ago
- Closed: 31 March 2003; 23 years ago
- Former names: Best of Africa (1999)

Africa 2 Africa or A2A (formerly Best of Africa or Channel Africa, no relation to the SABC radio station of the same name) was a South African entertainment channel owned by the SABC, combining its productions with programmes produced in other African countries. It merged with SABC Africa after its shutdown.

== History ==
The channel started as Best of Africa per a two-channel agreement with DStv to broadcast new networks aimed at a wider pan-continental audience. Unlike its sister channel SABC Africa, which broadcast on both Ku-band and C-band, Best of Africa only broadcast on the Ku-band system, with reduced coverage to southern Africa. 75% of the output was sourced from the SABC and other South African producers, with the remaining 25% from other African countries. Best of Africa had already bought programming from Nigeria, Ghana, Mozambique, Tunisia and Kenya. The programming mix included education, sports, magazine and music programmes.

On 1 May 1999, Best of Africa changed its name to Africa 2 Africa. At the time, 16 countries were already pooling its content to air on the network and was being received in 350,000 households in seven countries.

On 1 February 2000, the channel's coverage area expanded to the whole of Africa, following the launch of its broadcasts on DStv's C-band service. The service operated in eight-hour blocks, repeated three times a day to make a 24-hour schedule. Two hours (25%) were sourced from other countries as the channel's drawing card. As of early 2000, these were sourced from Tunisia, Egypt, Burkina Faso, Zimbabwe, South Africa, Guinea-Bissau, Cameroon and Ethiopia. The remaining six hours of the block (75%) consisted of South African programming: Generations, Isidingo, Shaka Zulu, John Ross, as well as dramas and sitcoms. The channel also carried 20 hours of children's programmes and 12 hours of music programmes every week. The primary obstacle for the coverage expansion was clearing the broadcast rights to air on the C-band satellite, as the SABC only had the rights to them in southern Africa. The paucity of African content was driven primarily by operational costs as a new channel and viewer preference for non-African content at the time. New programmes were being commissioned by the SABC for the service. In line with the formal launch of the two channels on DStv on 25 August 2000, the channel launched new original programmes: Africa Talks (talk show), African Journeys (travel), Movers & Shakers ("portraying Africa by Africans"), Goalmania (African and international soccer analysis) and Boxing Africa (highlights from ESPN as well as footage from boxing promotions in Namibia, Botswana, Kenya, Tanzania and Uganda).

Thanks to an agreement the SABC as a whole signed in 2001 with the ICC valid until 2007, Africa 2 Africa was eligible for the broadcast of ICC championships. For World AIDS Day (1 December) 2001 it aired a selection of films tackling the disease produced across Africa.

The channel shut down on 31 March 2003 and was merged with SABC Africa. Most of A2A's programmes moved to the service.
