= Daantjie =

Daantjie is a hypocorism of the given name Daniel. Notable people with the name include:

- Daantjie Badenhorst (born 1967), South African quiz show champion, journalist and author
- Daantjie Rossouw (1930–2010), South African rugby union footballer
- Daantjie van de Vyver (1909–1977), South African rugby union player
