= Noot vir Noot =

- Created by: Stemmburg Television
- Directed by: Johan Stemmet
- Presented by: Johan Stemmet 1991–2018; Emo Adams 2019–present
- Country of origin: South Africa
- No. of seasons: 46

Production
- Producer: Stemmburg Television
- Running time: 46 minutes

Original release
- Network: SABC 2
- Release: 1991

Noot vir Noot (Afrikaans for "Note for Note", i.e. music-note for a cash-note) is an Afrikaans language musical quiz show broadcast on SABC 2 on South African television. It was the longest continually running television game show in South Africa and Africa. The show was first broadcast in 1991 and was presented by Johan Stemmet, who retired on 27 January 2019. The production company, which owned the format, is Stemmburg Television, named after its founders, Stemmet, and former musical leader Johan van Rensburg.

As of season 44, which premiered on 15 August 2019 with a new format and style, the show is hosted by musician Emo Adams, with resident DJ, DJ Shelly (Rochelle de Bruyn) providing musical clues, replacing the band. Johan Stemmet moved to behind the scenes, taking on a producer role. On 27 July 2016, Noot vir Noot celebrated 25 years on air. Season 45 premiered on 28 May 2020, and airs Thursdays at 7pm on SABC 2.

Since 2023,the producers have also arranged a yearly roadshow, which took the basic programme format on a concert tour. A boardgame version of the show was also available. Notable past winners include Zelda Meyer (unbeaten champion) and Daantjie Badenhorst. The producers adapted the format of the program to include its first blind contestant, Ferdinand Venter. Noot vir Noot's 600th episode was aired in 2014.

== Format ==
Four contestants take part in each episode, during which they interpret a number of musical clues. The initial episode is followed by semi-finals and a finale. A guest artist or band perform a song as part of each episode. The music on Noot vir Noot was previously performed by the show's live band, Die Musiekfabriek (The Music Factory), which was led by the co-founder of the program, Johan van Rensburg, until 2012.

As of season 44 (2019), the show shifted to a brand new modern visual style. The set was redesigned to incorporate new technology such as video bars. A large DJ booth with LED screens is positioned opposite the contestant podiums which then allows for fun and engaging interaction between the host, DJ and contestants.

=== Adaptation ===
Noot vir Noot launched Potpourri in December 2010, during which some of the most popular medleys from the past seasons were rebroadcast. Season 1 premiered on SABC Encore from 8 May 2015 to 31 July 2015.

=== Band ===
The previous band members as of season 38 were:

- Jaconell Mouton (keyboards and band leader)
- Riaan van Rensburg (percussion)
- David Klassen (drums)
- Luke van der Merwe (guitar)
- Annelene Malan (bass guitar)
- Nathan Smith (guitar)

Other previous band members

- Glen Kieswetter (drums)
