= Takalani Sesame =

- Takalani Sesame logo
- Created by: Joan Ganz Cooney
- Based on: Sesame Street by: Joan Ganz Cooney; Lloyd Morrisett
- Developed by: Sesame Workshop; SABC Education; Sanlam
- Country of origin: South Africa

Production
- Executive producer: Seipati Bulane-Hopa
- Producer: Pulane Boesak
- Running time: 30 minutes per episode
- Production companies: Sesame Workshop; SABC Education; Sanlam

Original release
- Network: SABC 2
- Release: 7 August 2000 – present

Takalani Sesame ("be happy Sesame" in Venda) is the South African co-production of the children's television program Sesame Street, co-produced by Sesame Workshop and South African partners. The series debuted in 2000 and has been airing for the past 25 years.

== Overview ==
According to Sesame Workshop, Takalani Sesame is a "uniquely South African interpretation of the Sesame model, engaging children and their parents and promoting basic school readiness, literacy, numeracy, and health and hygiene." Takalani Sesame also has a special focus on HIV/AIDS awareness and seeks to introduce HIV/AIDS safety while promoting tolerance and reducing stigma. The Takalani series also includes a popular radio program, a newspaper and magazine comic strip series, and a national campaign which encourages adults to talk to their children about HIV/AIDS and related issues.

The show incorporates 11 of South Africa's 12 official languages: Afrikaans, English, Zulu, Xhosa, Swazi, Ndebele, Sesotho, Northern Sotho, Tsonga, Tswana and TshiVenda.

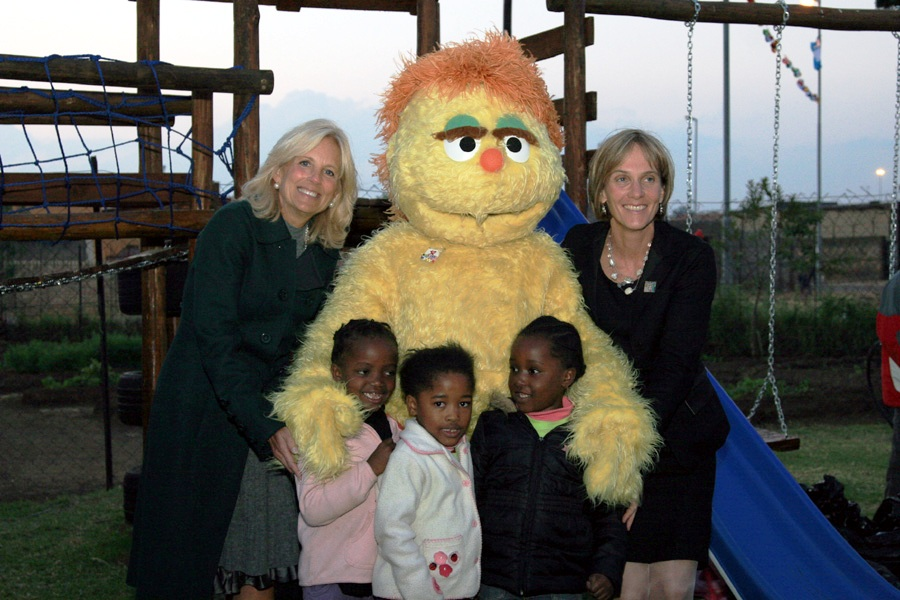
Kami poses with Jill Biden, children, and others in Soweto in 2010.

== Characters ==
The series features a number of muppet characters. Kami, an HIV-positive five-year old muppet, joined the show in its second season in 2002. Basma and Jad, who both originated on Ahlan Simsim, debuted on Takalani in its eleventh season. Other muppet characters include Elmo, Grover, Kupukeji, Moshe, Zikwe, and Zuzu.

=== Guests ===
Archbishop Desmond Tutu, Kofi Annan, and Nane Annan have made guest appearances on the show. Season 13 featured guest appearances from celebrities like Jason and Nicholas Goliath, David Kau, Sho Madjozi and Holly Rey.

== Episodes ==
- Season 11 of the show aired from 1 June 2020-27 November 2020 on South African television channel SABC 2.
- Season 12 played from 7 June 2021 to 3 December 2021 at 15:30 weekdays on SABC 2. Season 12 aired weekdays at 07:00 on SABC 1. Season 12 repeated Mondays & Saturdays at 05:00 & Mondays at 16:30 on S3.
- Season 13 started on 6 June 2022-2 December 2022 on SABC 2 at 15:30 and ran for 130 episodes.
- Season 14 aired weekdays on SABC 2 at 15:30 from 5 June 2023-2 December and ran for 130 episodes.
- Season 15 (Sesotho) was rebroadcast on Sabc2 and Sabc1 (Sesotho + isiNdebele) and Season 15 (Afrikaans) aired on Sabc2 at 15:00 weekdays and season 16 (Sesotho + isiNdebele) on Sabc1 weekdays at 7am. Seasons 15 and 16 aired on Sabc2 weekdays at 15:00 between December 2024-February 2025 in Sesotho and isiNdebele.
- Season 17 aired on Sabc2 weekdays at 15:00(13 episodes in Sesotho and 13 episodes in isiNdebele) from 7 April - 13 May 2025.
- Season 18 premiered on Sabc2 on 14 May 2025 and aired weekdays at 15:00 (Sesotho and isiNdebele) till 19th June 2025.

=== List of episodes ===
- Season 1 (July 2000 – March 2001)
1. The Muppets sing "Doing the Family Thing" (2000)
2. The Muppets see the importance of exercise in "What I Can Do" and "Mika Skipping Rope" (2000)
3. The song "That's what friends are for" explores the qualities of a friend (2000)
4. Zikwe writes a "book about me" (2000)
5. Takalani Sesame is holding a party about food (2000)
6. In "Sunrise to Sunset", we see the movement of the Sun during the day; a farmer plants corn and waits for rain (2000)
7. The Muppets learn that whenever we talk about transport we must also talk about safety; a bird helps a monkey get bananas (2000)
8. This is what my body can do (2000)
9. The children look at some special things that they can make or do (2000)
10. Children make their own elephant masks for a performance (2000)
11. Children greet each other in 11 languages (2000)
12. A little boy's sister has HIV and learns coping strategies (2000)
13. Losing things, looking for them and finding them are at the heart of this show (2001)
14. This show looks at different feelings and how we can express these feelings (2001)
15. Zuzu and Moshe share memories of toys they used to have; combing your hair can be fun (2001)
16. In a song we learn that insects are part of the circle of life (2001)
17. The Muppets and the children learn that everything and everybody needs water (2001)
18. In this show we see the Muppets busy with activities that need persistence and concentration; an ant works around an obstacle in his path (2001)
19. Zikwe and Zuzu use a telescope to look at the Moon (2001)

== Accolades ==
In late 2022 the program was nominated for an Annual Kidscreen Award in the Preschool Programming category. In September 2024, the program was nominated for an International Emmy Award in the Kids Factual category for The Takalani Sesame Big Feelings special.

== Controversy ==
The introduction of an HIV-positive Muppet, Kami, to increase awareness of HIV/AIDS was widely criticised by the U.S. political right, with such groups as the American Family Association seeing it as a means for HIV activists to influence young viewers.
