= SABC Education =

South African television channel

- Company logo
- Country: South Africa
- Broadcast area: South Africa
- Network: SABC
- Headquarters: SABC Television Park, Uitsaaisentrum, Johannesburg, South Africa

Programming
- Language(s): English
- Picture format: (576i, SDTV)

Ownership
- Owner: South African Broadcasting Corporation
- Sister channels: SABC 1; SABC 2; SABC 3; SABC News; SABC Lehae; SABC Sport; SABC Encore; SABC Children

History
- Founded: 1996

Links
- Website: www.sabceducation.co.za www.seva.co.za

Availability

Terrestrial
- Sentech: SABC DTT

Streaming media
- SABC Plus OTT: SABC Plus

SABC Education is a South African educational television channel owned by the South African Broadcasting Corporation (SABC).

== History ==
In 1991, TV2, TV3, and TV4 were combined into a new service called CCV (Contemporary Community Values). A third channel was introduced known as TSS, or TopSport Surplus, TopSport being the brand name for the SABC's sports coverage, but this was replaced by NNTV (National Network TV), an educational, non-commercial channel, in 1993.

Established in 1996, SABC Education is a SABC business unit responsible for delivering the educational mandate of the public broadcaster.

In 2012, The SABC announced plans to launch it as a standalone channel alongside 14 other channels the public broadcaster planned to launch on their DTT platforms alongside SABC 4, SABC 5, SABC Movies, and SABC Sport.

In 2015, SABC Education partnered up with Tuluntulu to launch the brand as an online channel alongside SABC Children.

In 2018, the SABC downsized its unfunded DTT plans to 9 channels with SABC Sport and Education present in that portfolio. They also launched a virtual academy for the brand to assist matriculants with their studies and equip them with the necessary skills to work independently.

In 2020, the COVID-19 pandemic forced the shutdown of most schools, and SABC rolled out SABC Education over DTT and YouTube from May 4, adding more platforms as time went on. In November 2022, SABC in partnership with Hisense Group South Africa Launched SABC Plus. SABC has been unable to add the channel to the satellite services DStv and StarSat.

== Programming ==
The content found on the 24/7 channel is either archived or found on SABC 1–3.

== See also ==
- List of South African media
- List of South African television channels
