= Catherine Muller (filmmaker) =

South African filmmaker

Catherine Muller is a South African factual filmmaker, television director, producer, screenwriter, video journalist and media educator. She has produced, directed and written shows for SABC, M-Net, e.tv, BBC, Channel 4 and Deutsche Welle (DW).

== Early life and education ==
Muller developed an early background in photography before studying film in the United Kingdom. She graduated from the University of Bristol's Film and Television program with a Master of Arts (M.A). Following her studies at Bristol, she made her debut short film, Raining Cats and Dogs.

== Career ==
In 2000, Muller served as the live-action series producer for Takalani Sesame, the South African adaptation of Sesame Street. The show won multiple awards. In 2002, she was the series director for the series documentary Get Real. Get Real received international acclaim, winning the United Nations NHK Japan Prize for "Courage in Depicting Youth in Difficult Circumstances", and it was selected for presentation at the Best of INPUT 2002.

Muller ventured into scripted television as a director and screenwriter. She written and directed for shows such as Take 5, Zola 7, Zone 14, Making Cents with the Sitholes and Shuga.

== Filmography ==
=== Television and film ===
Year	Title	Role	Format / Network	Notes
—	Raining Cats and Dogs	Director	Short film	Backed by Fuji Short Film Fund
2000	Takalani Sesame	Live-Action Series Producer	Educational series (SABC)	South African adaptation of Sesame Street
2001	Positive	Director	Television documentary	Broadcast release
2002	Get Real	Series Director	Educational youth series (SABC)	Recipient of United Nations NHK Japan Prize; official selection for Best of INPUT 2002
2002	Very Fast Guys	Director / Editor	Feature documentary	Official selection at 4th Encounters Festival and Ten Years of Freedom Festival (NYC)
2003	Four Rent Boys and a Sangoma	Director / Producer	Documentary (47 min)	Selected for African Film Festival archive (NYC)
2003	Drive, Pussycat, Drive!	Director / Producer	Television special	Broadcast release
2004	Sweet Mercy	Director	Television documentary	Broadcast release
2004	Paddy O'Zulu	Director	Television documentary	Broadcast release
2006	Pitch Revolution (Parts 1 & 2)	Co-director / Producer	Documentary series (e.tv)	Co-directed with Nceba Mqolomba; produced by Little Bird Productions
2007	Zone 14	Director	Television drama series (SABC)	Broadcast release
2008	Total Soccer	Producer / Director	Documentary series	Multi-part 2010 FIFA World Cup documentary project
2009	Shuga	Director	Drama / Educational series	Youth health advocacy drama
2011	Harambee	Director	Television documentary	Broadcast release
2014	Making Cents with the Sitholes	Director / Writer	Family television series	Educational family series
2018–2019	Isithembiso	Screenwriter	Telenovela (Mzansi Magic)	SAFTA winner for Best Script in a TV Soap
—	Art See Africa	Director	6-Part documentary series	Produced for Deutsche Welle (DW)
