= SABC News =

News division of the South African Broadcasting Corporation

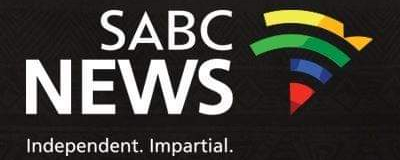
- Type: Division
- Industry: Broadcast media
- Founded: 14 November 1922; 103 years ago
- Headquarters: SABC Television Park, Johannesburg, South Africa
- Services: Radio, internet, and television broadcasts
- Parent: South African Broadcasting Corporation
- Website: www.sabcnews.com

SABC News is the news division of the SABC, South Africa's state owned/ public broadcaster. The division produces news content for the SABC's platforms, including bulletins for its television channels, radio stations, and digital properties, in English and other national languages.

== History ==
The News Service was established in June 1950, replacing the programmes of the BBC. Although this was because the BBC broadcasts were seen as giving a British viewpoint of current affairs, there were also concerns that the SABC service would become overly pro-government, or "Our Master's Voice". By 1968, it had over 100 full-time reporters in the main cities and local correspondents all over the country, with overseas news provided by Reuters, AFP, AP and UPI. There was a News Film Unit which, prior to television in 1976, produced films for news agencies and television organisations.

During the apartheid regime, SABC News was understood as "his Master's Voice", a mere propaganda tool.

In 1998, the SABC began to broadcast two TV channels to the rest of Africa: SABC Africa, a news service, and Africa 2 Africa, entertainment programming from South Africa and other African countries, via DStv. In 2003, Africa 2 Africa was merged with SABC Africa to create a hybrid service, drawing programming from both sources. SABC Africa closed in August 2008 after the SABC's contract with DStv was not renewed. In 2007, the SABC launched a 24-hour international news channel, SABC News International, but closed in 2010.

The theme made for the SABC News bulletins in the 2000s was composed by Colin Shapiro, a former director of the South African Recording Rights Association Limited (Sarral). As of December 2009, he requested Sarral's dissolution as he was not receiving royalties for his composition.

SABC News
- Country: South Africa
- Broadcast area: South Africa; African continent
- Network: SABC
- Headquarters: SABC Television Park, Uitsaaisentrum, Johannesburg, Gauteng, South Africa

Programming
- Language: English

Ownership
- Owner: SABC
- Sister channels: SABC 1; SABC 2; SABC 3; SABC Lehae; SABC Education; SABC Sport; SABC Encore; SABC Children

History
- Launched: 1 August 2013

Links
- Website: www.sabcnews.com

Availability

Terrestrial
- Digital Terrestrial Television: Channel 9 (Discontinued)
- DStv: Channel 404

On 1 August 2013, SABC News launched a 24-hour news channel on DStv, as part of an agreement with MultiChoice that also saw the launch of SABC Encore. SABC News head Jimi Matthews stated that the channel was part of an effort by the SABC to account for changing viewing habits, explaining that "very few people are still satisfied waiting for bulletins in the evening. Previously, it was appointment viewing, where you rushed home to watch the 8 p.m. news. While we see continuous growth in radio news offerings, digital sites are exploding in growth. There is a decline in the television news service. If you are going to produce television news, you have to play in the 24-hour space." In 2018, MultiChoice renewed its agreement with the SABC. It also unveiled a new slogan, Independent. Impartial. which was seen as a way to distance itself from the fact that it was a state-owned corporation.

At the end of July 2024, SABC News cancelled Kids News Room after 20 years on air. Its permanent staff members moved to other programmes produced by the unit.

== Programming ==
- Morning Live With Leanne Manas And Sakina Kamwendo

Weekdays 05:30 - 09:00

- The Agenda With Ayanda Nyathi & Mfundo Mabalane

Weekdays 09:00 - 13:00

- The Business Agenda with Mpho Kubayi

Weekdays 13:00 - 14:00

- SA Today With Unathi Batyashe & Thembekile Mrototo

Weekdays 14:00 - 17:00

- The Full View With Bongiwe Zwane And Thulasizwe Simelane

Weekdays 17:00 - 21:00

- The Late Edition with Oliver Dickson

Daily 21:00 - 23:00

[Weekends]

- Morning Live Weekend With Liezle Wilson

Sat & Sun 06:00 - 09:00

- The Weekend Agenda

Sat & Sun 09:00 - 12:00

- Week In Review With Thabiso Kotane

Saturdays 12:00 - 14:00

- Week Ahead With Thabiso kotane

Sunday 12:00 - 14:00

- SA Today With Alicia Jali

Saturdays And Sundays 14:00 - 17:00

- Full View With Mbali Thethani

Sat 18:00 - 21:00 Sun 17:00 - 19:00

- Unwrap Africa With Thembekile Mrototo

Sundays 20:00 - 21:00

- It's Topical With Blain Herman

Sundays 19:00 - 20:00

- Late edition weekends with Lopang Alamu and Mxolisi Masango
