= SABC Children =

South African children's television channel

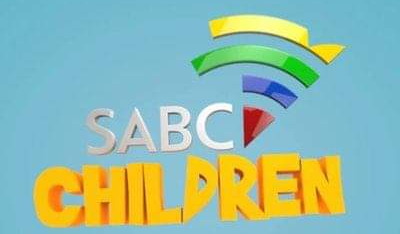
- Country: South Africa
- Broadcast area: Nationwide
- Network: SABC

Programming
- Language(s): English
- Picture format: (576i, SDTV)

Ownership
- Owner: South African Broadcasting Corporation
- Sister channels: SABC 1 SABC 2 SABC 3 SABC News; SABC Lehae; SABC Sport; SABC Education; SABC Encore

SABC Children is a 24-hour online children's channel offering a mix of local and international content in South Africa.

== History ==
In September 2011 SABC executives and the SABC board told parliament that the SABC's offering for digital terrestrial television (DTT) will consist of 18 TV channel including SABC1, SABC2, SABC3 as well as a children's channel before scrapping it in 2015.

In 2015, an online brand called Tuluntulu rolled out 18 free channels including SABC Education and SABC Children.
