= Hectic Nine-9 =

2007 South African TV programme

- Genre: Interactive Magazine and Entertainment Teen
- Created by: Okuhle Media
- Country of origin: South Africa
- Original language: English

Production
- Production locations: Cape Town, South Africa
- Production company: Okuhle Media

Original release
- Network: SABC 2
- Release: 1 October 2007

Hectic Nine-9 is a South African teen television live interactive magazine show produced by Okuhle Media for SABC 2. It is South Africa's Flagship Youth Entertainment Show and the second–longest running youth program on SABC (South African Broadcasting Corporation). The program focuses on the latest local and international celebrity news and gossip, trending topics, games, music, and fashion.

== Content ==
Hectic Nine-9 generates a wide variety of theme based content covering local and international news and topics. Weekdays are broken down into specific themes such as:

- Monday: #HecticLIVE
- Tuesday: #HecticREAL
- Wednesday: #HecticCHELLENGER
- Thursday: #HecticTALK
- Friday: #HecticLOUD

=== Specials and Sub Shows ===
Hectic Nine-9 has given rise to many specials, sub shows, and spin off series.

==== FIFA World Cup Animation Series ====
A 32-part animation series developed for the 2010 FIFA World Cup highlighting each country playing in the 2010 FIFA world Cup hosted in South Africa. The series focused on the significance of particular national and cultural elements for each country as a means of educating South Africa's youth on the cultures of the people who would be visiting South Africa during the tournament. Countries covered included: South Africa, Brazil, Spain, Netherlands, Italy, Germany, Argentina, England, Australia, Japan, North Korea, South Korea, Honduras, Mexico, United States, New Zealand, Algeria, Cameroon, Ghana, Ivory Coast, Nigeria, Chile, Paraguay, Uruguay, Denmark, France, Greece, Portugal, Serbia, Slovakia, Slovenia, Switzerland.

==== RAWkus ====
A musically based talent series where participants auditioned their musical talents through multiple judging and elimination rounds. Successful participants worked their way through to the final round where a winner was selected by popular viewership vote. Each round participants received feedback from judges who were leaders in the South African music industry.

==== Survive It ====
Participants engaged in survival style challenges over a 48hr period to be crowned the ultimate Hectic Nine-9 survivor.

==== Signal High ====
A local teen drama filmed in Cape Town, Signal High began as a mini series on Hectic Nine-9, earning its own time slot on SABC 2 in 2018.

==== Hectic Takeover ====
A campaign that harnessed fans’ enthusiasm for the show into practical industry training. For a total of three weeks interns were mentored by the show's production team as they learned the ropes of live television. At the end of the three weeks the production team handed over the show for one full episode to the interns. Hectic Takeover was a national success.

== Concept ==
Hectic Nine-9 is a teen television program produced by Okuhle Media that airs every weekday from 4:30-5pm on SABC2.

Based on the concept of ‘smart, connected viewing’, Hectic Nine-9 (HN9 for short) offers a variety of content that appeals to a primary target audience of 13-18years old. Hectic Nine-9 (HN9) adapts their content to viewer feedback using their extensive following on social media platforms.

HN9 is a Broadcast Commission under the SABC Children's Department, and has recently been included under the SABC Education Department. Hectic Nine-9 aligns their content to teen viewing aimed at empowering the youth of South Africa.

== Presenters ==
- Natisha Van Zyl (2007 - 2009)
- Akhona (2007 - 2009)
- Asanda Maku (2007-2009)
- Schelaine Bennett (2007-2010)
- Grant Flynn (2007 - 2010)
- Ayanda Makuzeni (2007 - 2018)
- Laurian Nortje (2007 - 2018)
- Lineo Lekhanya (2010 - 2011)
- Loyisa Mdebuka (2010 - 2015)
- Mathew Moolman (2010 - 2012)
- Danine Naidoo (2010 - 2012)
- Nicol De Andrade (2010 - 2011)
- Chanelle Davids (2012 - 2020)
- Samora Mangesi (2013 - 2017)
- Mbasa Fefe (2013 - 2017)
