= SABC Sport =

South African television channel

SABC SPORT
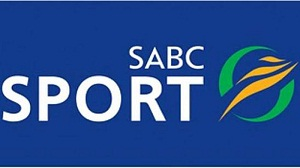
- For The Love of The Game
- Country: South Africa
- Broadcast area: South Africa
- Network: SABC
- Transmitters: SABC DTT; OpenView; SABC Direct-To-Home; SABC+
- Affiliates: ESPN, Red Bull
- Headquarters: SABC Television Park, Uitsaaisentrum, Johannesburg, South Africa

Programming
- Languages: English; IsiZulu; Setswana; Afrikaans; IsiNdebele; TshiVenda; Xhosa
- Picture format: 16:9 (1080i, HDTV)

Ownership
- Owner: South African Broadcasting Corporation
- Sister channels: SABC 1; SABC 2; SABC 3; SABC News; SABC Lehae; SABC Education; SABC Encore; SABC Children

History
- Founded: 1991; 35 years ago
- Launched: 1991; 35 years ago
- Former names: TopSport Surplus

Links
- Website: www.sabcsport.co.za/sabcsport/

Availability

Terrestrial
- SABC Direct-To-Home And Digital Terrestrial Television: SABC DTT Channel 4
- OpenView HD Channel 124

Streaming media
- SABC Plus App: SABC Plus OTT

SABC SPORT is a South African free-to-air sports television channel owned by the South African Broadcasting Corporation (SABC).

The channel was operating for a while on DTT before expanding on other platforms. After its expansion, the channel is now among the top 10 most watched channels on Openview pulling over 1.4. million viewers.

== History ==
In 1991, TV2, TV3 and TV4 (now SABC 1-3) were combined into a new service called CCV (Contemporary Community Values). A third channel was introduced known as TSS, or TopSport Surplus, TopSport being the brand name for the SABC's sport coverage, but this was replaced by NNTV (National Network TV), an educational, non-commercial channel, in 1993.

In 1996, SABC Sport was relaunched from its former branding. Its fundamental mission is to provide full FTA coverage of live sporting events, jam-packed highlights, fixtures, and live sports crosses on the SABC network and its own frequencies.

On 8 August 2003, Topsport was replaced by the current SABC Sport brand.

In 2012, The SABC planned to invest R732.7 million over the next two years to set up SABC Sport as a separate TV channel in South Africa on October 1. They also signed a multimillion rand deal with America's NBA to show full coverage on SABC Sport and selected matches to SABC 1 to prevent viewing disruption before missing the deadline.

In 2015, they scrapped their initial plans for DTT and downsized to 5 channels with one of them being SABC Sport.

In 2018, they scrapped their unfunded initial plans from 2015 and opted to launch another 4 unfunded channels being SABC Parliament, SABC History, SABC Education and SABC Health with SABC Sport still present in their portfolio.

In October 2020, Telkom Mobile launched its TelkomONE video streaming service including linear TV channels such as SABC Education on its free package.

In November 2022, just a few days before the 2022 FIFA World Cup Qatar could start, SABC announced the new streaming service SABC Plus OTT in partnership with Hisense Group South Africa. SABC Plus has replaced TelkomONE as SABC took over the platform.

In March 2021, eMedia Investments, owners of free-to-air satellite service Openview, and the SABC reached a business agreement that sees Openview continue to broadcast high-definition channels SABC 1, 2 and 3, as well as 3 additional television channels with one being SABC Sport from the public broadcaster, as well as all 19 radio stations owned by the SABC. SABC Sport alongside their radio stations were made available on Openview from April 17.

In June 2021, the SABC hosted a live broadcast of the official launch of its Sports Channel following the successful soft launch of its 24 Hour Sports Channel on the SABC DTT service, the Openview set-top-box and the (Telkom ONE) now SABC Plus mobile streaming platform in April 2021. The launch also featured Team SAs announcement of the second team squad for the Tokyo 2020 Olympic Games on the Sports Channel. A month later, the channel's general manager mentioned in an interview with SAfm Radio that the SABC has considered launching a second sports channel.

== Broadcasting rights held ==
- South African Premiership
- Bundesliga
- MTN 8
- Nedbank Cup
- National Basketball Association
- FIFA World Cup
- FIFA World Cup qualification - CAF
- South Africa national soccer team
- Premier League
- Top 14
- Olympic Games
- Rugby World Cup
- ICC Cricket World Cup
- South African Sports Confederation and Olympic Committee
- FIA World Rally Championship
- Africa Cup of Nations
- CAF Champions League
- CAF Confederations Cup
- J4Joy Boxing Tournaments
- COSAFA competitions
- Hollywoodbets Super League
- Sasol Women's League
- World Sports Betting Live Horseracing
- Premier Boxing Champions
- Extreme Fighting Championship
- 2023 Netball World Cup
- World Sports Betting Carlton Cup
- Davis Cup
- Premier League
- Major League Wrestling
- Proteas
- South Africa women's national cricket team
- Tennis South Africa
- ITF Men's World Tennis Tour
- ITF Women's World Tennis Tour
- Durban July
- FIFA U20 World Cup
- FIFA Women's World Cup

== See also ==
- List of South African media
