= Eswatini TV =

Swazi television channel

- Country: Eswatini
- Broadcast area: Eswatini
- Headquarters: Mbabane, Eswatini

Programming
- Languages: English and Swazi
- Picture format: 1080i HDTV

Ownership
- Owner: Eswatini Broadcasting and Information Service

History
- Launched: 1 February 1978
- Former names: STBC (1978–1983); Swazi TV (1983–2018)

Links
- Website: www.eswatinitv.co.sz

Availability

Terrestrial
- Digital terrestrial television in Eswatini: Channel 2

Eswatini TV, formerly known as Swazi TV, is a Swazi television channel owned by the Eswatini Broadcasting and Information Service (EBIS, formerly SBIS). It was the only television channel in the country until the establishment of the Ultipro-backed Channel S in 2001.

== History ==
=== STBC ===
The Swaziland Television Broadcasting Company (STBC) was established in 1977 as a small private company that was owned by British electronic firms, with the government holding 10% of its shares. It started broadcasting on 1 February 1978, being opened by King Sobhuza II. As of 1979, the channel broadcast from 6pm to 10:30pm every evening; though with an additional two hours on Saturdays from 4pm carrying sports programmes before the regular schedule. The coverage area was limited to Mbabane and its surrounding areas, Manzini and surrounding areas, Ezolwini Valley, Matsapha, Sidvokodvo, Mhlambanyatsi and Bunya. Television sets were installed in secondary schools in order to reach out to the lower class; such schools were open during the evening, doubling as television viewing houses. The same also applied to community centres of Usutu Paper & Pulp Co. at Mhlambanyatsi and the Bunya railway. Early estimates showed that 80% of the audience was Swazi, the remaining 20% of European descent.

=== Swaziland Television Authority/Swazi TV ===
The government took over the STBC in 1983 with the passing of the Swaziland Television Authority Act on 1 April 1983. Its signal was received via spillover in adjacent parts of South Africa. During the 1980s, it published its own listings magazine, the Swazi TV News.

Swazi TV was forced to halt its retransmission of the SABC services on 15 October 1997, by shutting down the transmitter that was used to relay its services into Swaziland, which was deemed to be too costly. Some suggested a political cause for this, as its news service provided unfiltered coverage of the strikes that hit the public sector in 13-14 October. An illegal strike broke out at Swazi TV in October 1999, forcing two of its staff to be fired on 28 October. Within a few days, six STBC workers left without pay, while freelance journalist Emanuel Cele, who did not take part in the strike, was ordered to leave the studio. The cause was related to pay rights, as they demanded a 7% back pay. The reduction in South African TV relays continued when, on 11 September 2000, the SABC began to shut down its analogue satellite signals, beginning with SABC 3, a move which was massively criticised by locals, who thought Swazi TV provided an inferior quality service, as well as being partial to the ruling government. It and SABC 1 were the country's most popular channels in 2000.

In November 2001, Swazi TV signed a deal with pan-African television syndicator ABN. By 2014, its morning programme Kusile had become a platform for gender-related issues, including the topic of gender-based violence.

The channel was temporarily available to DStv subscribers across the entire SADC region between 29 and 31 August 2016 for its coverage of the SADC summit which was held in Mbabane.

=== Eswatini TV ===
Since the rename of Swaziland into Eswatini in 2018, the channel was renamed Eswatini TV.
