= Channel Yemaswati =

Swati television channel

- Country: Eswatini
- Broadcast area: Eswatini
- Headquarters: Mbabane, Eswatini

Programming
- Languages: English and Swazi
- Picture format: 1080i HDTV

Ownership
- Owner: Ultipro

History
- Launched: March 2001
- Former names: Channel S (2001–2018)

Channel Yemaswati (formerly known as Channel S or Channel Swazi) is Eswatini's only commercial television channel. The channel adopted its current name upon the rename from Swaziland to Eswatini in 2018.

== History ==
It was launched in March 2001 by Ultimate Television Productions (Ultipro) using a Ku-band satellite from PanAmSat used by both DStv and Sentech's Vivid, reaching an audience across the SADC region. Although it was set up as a private station, it is owned "on behalf of His Majesty" and was historically known for its limited coverage, compared to Swazi TV, where its signal didn't reach even some large towns.

In 2008, the channel was involved in a financial scandal, as Qhawe Mamba, the channel's owner, did not receive the earnings from Channel S Club members, being transferred to Ultipro in the process.

Channel S was reported to operated without a license in November 2009. In late October 2010, the channel moved to "half-empty" premises at an office in the Manzini Mall. The station lacked transmitters of its own and was broadcasting on rented South African transmitters and facilities. Contents were saved on a flash drive and sent to Nkoyoyo, where it was uploaded to a server. From then, the server delivered its information to the Johannesburg satellite facilities before beaming back to Swaziland.

In 2021, Qhawe Mamba announced that he would change the channel's news operation to focus more on stories that impact people. Such stories, according to Mamba, bring in high viewing figures.
