= Daantjie Badenhorst =

South African quiz show champion

- Born: Daniel Streicher Badenhorst; 6 December 1967 (age 58); Pietermaritzburg, Natal, South Africa
- Known for: Appearance on Noot vir Noot

Daniel Streicher Badenhorst (born 6 December 1967), better known as Daantjie Badenhorst and nicknamed Daantjie Dinamiet (Daantjie Dynamite), is a South African quiz show champion, journalist and author. He is known for winning series 24 of the long-running Afrikaans language television musical quiz show, Noot vir Noot, and later also won the 2005 edition of "Flinkdink", a televised Afrikaans language general knowledge quiz show.

== Early life and career ==
Badenhorst was born in Pietermaritzburg in the then Natal Province on 6 December 1967. He was one of four children. Badenhorst completed high school at Hoërskool Waterkloof, Pretoria, in 1985 and subsequently went to work for the South African Government Printing Works.

In 2004, Badenhorst entered Noot vir Noot and immediately made history during the first round when he surpassed the scoreboard's maximum of ZAR 10,000 before the end of the show. This was the first time it happened in the show's history. His winnings for the evening totalled ZAR 26,075. Badenhorst's performance on the show, and his autism spectrum disorder, drew wide interest and articles about him appeared in many newspapers and magazines, including Huisgenoot and YOU. His total winnings in the series was ZAR 77,200 - an all-time record. He was subsequently offered, and accepted, a sub-editor position at Beeld, South Africa's largest Afrikaans language newspaper. Since then, he has become a content editor of the internet edition of the newspaper.

As a result of his performance in Noot vir Noot, he was invited to take part in the 2005 edition of the Flinkdink quiz show, which he also won. Because of his increasing fame, Badenhorst also starred in the South African commercial for the Chevrolet Aveo.

Subsequent to that, he was invited back to Noot vir Noot for a champions of champions programme which he lost to Zelda Meyer.

== Personal life ==
Badenhorst's native language is Afrikaans, but he also speaks English, French and German fluently. His first novel, "Net een wenner" (Only One Winner) was published in 2005. Badenhorst is married and has two children, Dirk (born 12 July 2004) and Suzanne (born 28 May 2007). He has Asperger syndrome and campaigns for public awareness of the condition.
