= Eswatini Broadcasting and Information Service =

State-owned broadcast and print information provider

Eswatini Broadcasting and Information Service is the state-owned broadcast and print information provider of Eswatini, which essentially wields total control over all media within the country. It was founded in 1966 as a radio broadcaster, and was merged with print media in the early 1970s. It is a member of the Commonwealth Broadcasting Association. Since 1991, it has been under the Ministry of Broadcasting, Information and Tourism, and is responsible for:

1. Radio and television broadcasting services;
2. Newspapers, magazines, and other printed governmental publications;
3. Government information services, including internet;
4. Accreditation of foreign news reporters and correspondents operating in Eswatini.

== Eswatini Television Authority ==
The Eswatini Television Authority runs a station known as Eswatini TV (formerly Swazi TV). It was officially started by King Sobhuza II, in February 1978, as the Swaziland Television Broadcasting Corporation (STBC). Before that, the station had been run by a private company. In 1983, the Swazi Parliament created the Eswatini Television Authority.

In November 2001, Swazi TV signed a deal with pan-African television syndicator ABN.

=== Phesheya Dube ===
Phesheya Dube (nl) was a Swazi journalist working for the Swaziland Broadcasting and Information Service who pretended that he reported from the midst of the fighting in Baghdad during the 2003 invasion of Iraq.

When the war in Iraq started, Dube began to send "live" reports from Baghdad to the Morning Show of Radio Eswatini. Program host Moses Matsebula even told him to take care of himself and once instructed him to find a cave to hide from the missiles. He also asked listeners to pray for Dube when the station appeared to have lost contact with him.

In March 2003, legislators in the Eswatini parliament spotted Dube outside parliament. MP Jojo Dlamini demanded an explanation from Information Minister Mntomzima Dlamini in the House of Assembly. Dlamini said he would investigate and later reprimanded Dube.

Dube had been broadcasting live from his home. He had based his reports on international news stories and rehashed them into his own material. Dube continued to work for Radio Eswatini in other capacities.
