= SABC 2 =

South African television channel

- Country: South Africa
- Network: SABC
- Headquarters: SABC Television Park, Uitsaaisentrum, Johannesburg, South Africa

Programming
- Languages: Sepedi; Sesotho; Setswana; Venda; Tsonga; English
- Picture format: 1080i HDTV

Ownership
- Owner: SABC
- Sister channels: SABC 1; SABC 3; SABC NEWS; SABC Lehae; SABC Education; SABC Sport; SABC Children; SABC Encore

History
- Launched: 5 May 1975 (test transmission); 6 January 1976 (start of regular broadcasts, as SABC TV/SAUK-TV); 31 December 1981 (as TV1); 4 February 1996 (as SABC 2)
- Replaced: TV 2/3/4
- Former names: CCV TV

Links
- Website: www.sabc2.co.za

Availability

Terrestrial
- Sentech: SABC DTT Channel 2
- DStv: Channel 192
- OpenView: Channel 102

Streaming media
- SABC Plus OTT: SABC Plus
- DStv Now: Channel 192

SABC 2 is a South African free-to-air television channel owned by the South African Broadcasting Corporation (SABC). The channel was established in its current form on 4 February 1996, following the restructuring of the three national SABC networks.

As of March 2024, SABC 2 broadcasts programming in English, Venda, Tsonga, Sotho, Sepedi, and Setswana.

In August 2018, the channel began broadcasting in high definition.

== History ==
=== SABC TV ===
Before the launch of SABC TV, South Africa was already served by a few closed-circuit systems in hotels. The South African Broadcasting Corporation (SABC) began airing test cards in early 1975 on its transmitters, and trialled its first television service on 5 May 1975 in South Africa's major cities. The corporation officially launched its first television channel on 5 January 1976 under the name SABC Television/SAUK-Televisie.

The launch made South Africa the last industrialised country to introduce television, with an estimated one million viewers. Approximately 222,000 television sets were tuned in for the inauguration. As in other countries, the arrival of television negatively affected other sectors of the entertainment industry, particularly cinemas. Within the corporation itself, SABC's regional radio stations experienced a loss of listeners to the new television network, although Radio 5's playlists remained unchanged.

The service opened at 6:00 pm with a bilingual speech presented by Heinrich Maritz (Afrikaans) and Dorianne Berry (English), marking the culmination of a five-year project. The first programme broadcast was a special presentation from the Children's and Youth Division in Afrikaans, featuring Haas Das and other characters created by the unit. The English-language programme The Everywhere Express, which had featured during the test service the previous year, also formed part of the introductory broadcast.

The official opening of the service took place at 8:00 pm with a speech by Prime Minister John Vorster. One million viewers tuned in on the opening night, while approximately 250,000 television sets had been sold in the country during the second half of 1975 alone.

As of 1977, the SABC-TV service was transmitted via eighteen transmitters:

- Alverstone–Durban–Pinetown: channel 4
- Bloemfontein: channel 9
- Cape Town: channel 8
- Davel–Bethal–Ermelo: channel 22 (UHF)
- East London: channel 9
- George–Mossel Bay: channel 5
- Glencoe–Dundee: channel 27 (UHF)
- Hartbeesfontein–Klerksdorp: channel 45 (UHF)
- Johannesburg: channel 13
- Kimberley: channel 4
- Kroonstad: channel 57 (UHF)
- Middelburg–Witbank: channel 41 (UHF)
- Port Elizabeth–Uitenhage: channel 7
- Port Shepstone–Margate: channel 8
- Pretoria: channel 5
- Theunissen: channel 5
- Villiersdorp: channel 7
- Welverdiend–Potchefstroom: channel 7

Two years after its launch, a South African Sunday newspaper described the service as "prissy and pricey": "prissy" due to the strict moral standards of the SABC, and "pricey" owing to the high costs of purchasing a television set and paying the licence fee. The introduction of television advertising at the time posed a threat to newspaper advertisers. The daily schedule typically ran for five hours (6:00 pm to 11:00 pm, with earlier closing on Sundays) and included several hours of sport on Saturdays. Technically, the SABC claimed to uphold high standards, though this did not necessarily extend to its programming. The service was also criticised for functioning as a propaganda tool for the then-ruling National Party. Regarding sport, fearing a loss of rugby attendance, it broadcast niche sports such as cycling and yachting.

By 1979, SABC TV broadcasts reached 80% of the white population and 42% of the black population. Censorship remained prevalent; one notable incident occurred in August 1979, when an episode of Dallas featuring a homosexual affair was omitted from broadcast for being considered "too sensitive" for the conservative South African audience of the time, angering fans of the series.

=== TV1 ===
On 31 December 1981, two new television channels were introduced: TV2, broadcasting in Zulu and Xhosa, and TV3, broadcasting in Sotho and Tswana. Both channels were aimed at a Black urban audience and operated on the same television frequency. The main network, renamed TV1, continued to divide its broadcasting time evenly between English and Afrikaans.

In July 1983, the channel introduced its first non-white continuity announcer, Vivian Solomons, who presented the Afrikaans segments and was of mixed race. As the SABC did not have a dedicated channel for mixed race or Indian South Africans, the corporation increased the number of non-white presenters appearing on screen. However, this move attracted some viewer complaints, with nearly 40 callers contacting the corporation upon Solomons's introduction.

Around 1985, TV1 began broadcasting the popular American sitcom The Cosby Show, which moved to TV4 by early 1986. The decision to air the series on TV1 was based on the reasoning that, had it aired on the TV2 and TV3 networks, it would have been dubbed into one of the target languages, potentially diminishing its humour and cultural nuance.

A local sitcom comparable to All in the Family, titled People Like Us, was filmed throughout 1987 but did not air until 23 December 1989. It was broadcast late at night (10:25 pm on Saturdays) to avoid offending white audiences, and to ensure that children of all races were asleep at the time. One viewer accused the corporation of cowardice, arguing that the series should have been broadcast in a prime-time weekday slot to attract a broader audience. The series aired only weeks before Nelson Mandela's 11 February 1990 speech, which was broadcast by the SABC and marked a significant break from its previous editorial biases.

The end of Apartheid brought radical changes to the channel, which sought to distance itself from its segregated past. Ethnic diversity became more visible on screen; for example, the morning show Good Morning South Africa featured a white man and a Black woman co-presenting—something that would have been impossible during Apartheid. In 1992, four non-white presenters were hired for current affairs programming and four more for religious programmes.

On 21 September 1993, the SABC signed an agreement with Sky News allowing TV1 to air the channel during its off-air hours from 15 October that year, similar to the arrangement sister channel CCV had with CNN International. Beginning in October 1993, TV1 aired the series Future Imperfect, in which political figures from both the ruling and opposition parties debated hypothetical scenarios. The programme was broadcast late at night, at 10:15 pm on Thursdays, which limited viewership among Black audiences. The channel was still perceived as biased towards President F. W. de Klerk, while CCV was viewed as favouring Mandela.

Following the 1994 democratic elections, it was suggested that TV1 should transition to an entirely English-language channel. By October 1994, discussions were underway to restructure the SABC's three television channels, with two adopting mixed-language schedules and the third operating as a fully English-language, profit-oriented entertainment network. At this time, the channel's slogan was "This one's for you!" (Dié een is vir jou!). In July 1994, TV1 began broadcasting selected programmes from MTV.

In February 1996, following a decision made in November 1995, TV1 was rebranded as SABC 2. Under the new structure, the channel increased its English-language programming in line with demographic research findings. Across the three SABC channels, 65% of prime-time content was to be broadcast in English. The SABC had planned this change a year earlier, as several advertisers had threatened to withdraw their commercials from TV1 due to the planned reduction of Afrikaans content—from 50% of weekly airtime to 10%. TV1 was expected to become an all-English channel.

=== SABC 2 ===
In 1996, the SABC reorganised its three television networks with the aim of making them more representative of South Africa's various language groups. These were renamed SABC 3 (formerly TV1), SABC 1 (formerly CCV), and SABC 2 (formerly NNTV). The amount of time allocated to Afrikaans-language programming on the new channel, SABC 2, fell from 50% to 15%, a move that alienated many Afrikaans speakers. A spokesperson for the SABC stated that such a reduction was "inevitable in the post-apartheid era" and acknowledged that the SABC had not fully adhered to the Independent Broadcasting Authority's (IBA) recommendations.

Under the new format, 40% of SABC 2's schedule was in English, with the remaining 60% dedicated to other languages. The new service targeted Afrikaans and Sotho speakers during prime time. The all-day language breakdown at the time of the change was: 41% English, 15% Afrikaans, 8% Sepedi, 6% Sesotho, 8% Setswana, and 1% each for Xitsonga and Tshivenda. In addition, 21% of the channel’s programming was multilingual.

With the commercialisation of the SABC in July 1997, the channel discontinued its loss-making breakfast show, Good Morning South Africa, which it had inherited from the apartheid-era TV1. Later that year, the SABC announced that SABC 2 would focus more on public service programming. On 1 December 1997, the channel adopted a new look.

In July 1998, the channel signed a contract with Urban Brew Studios to produce a new breakfast show, am2day. The programme was initially scheduled to debut in mid-September but was delayed by two weeks as the studios were not yet ready. To counter the launch of e.tv, the SABC reformatted SABC 2 as a channel focusing on educational and social issues. In October 1999, it was announced that the contract with Urban Brew Studios would end that month, and am2day would be replaced by a new breakfast show produced internally by the SABC to optimise its resources. Urban Brew staff criticised the decision, claiming they were the targets of a slander campaign. On 4 January 2000, the channel adjusted its evening news bulletins, with the Afrikaans bulletin airing at 7:00 p.m. and the Sesotho bulletin at 9:00 p.m.

In 2002, the channel described itself as "the voice, the heart and the mind of South Africans", citing its extensive broadcast footprint—the largest of any SABC terrestrial network. Seeking to expand its audience among Black and Afrikaans viewers, the channel aimed to increase its local content, reflecting diverse South African cultures and communities. Three new projects were developed: The Res, Dark City and Zero Tolerance. 7de Laan increased its weekly episodes to four, while Muvhango entered its third season in April that year.

In April 2003, SABC 2 announced twelve new original programmes, with a combined budget of US$4 million. These included sitcoms, documentaries, dramas, and a family game show. On 11 May, the channel began carrying a History Channel programming block under an agreement with AETN.

On 1 March 2013, SABC 2 adopted its current logo. Blue became the primary colour of the channel's branding, accompanied by red, yellow, and green accents. However, at the time of rebranding, its programming was still described as "dated".

SABC 2 was initially scheduled to begin high-definition broadcasts via DStv in July 2018, but the HD broadcasts officially commenced on 8 August 2018.

In August 2025, the SABC cancelled Muvhango, depriving the channel of a substantial primetime programme in the Venda language.

== Programming ==
Following the restructuring of the SABC's television channels, SABC 2 replaced the former TV1 channel. The reduced prominence of Afrikaans programming angered many Afrikaans speakers, although the channel continues to feature a significant amount of Afrikaans content, including news bulletins broadcast on weeknights at 19:00 and weekends at 18:00.

Recognising the market demand for Afrikaans-language content, M-Net launched the Afrikaans subscription channel KykNET in 1999, followed in 2005 by the music channel MK (originally known as MK89). In 2009, M-Net introduced Koowee, a children's channel broadcasting in Afrikaans.

=== Soapies, dramas and telenovelas ===
The channel is known for its long-running soap operas 7de Laan and Muvhango, as well as dramas such as Erfsondes, Geraamtes in die Kas, Roer Jou Voete and 90 Plein Street. Its telenovelas include Keeping Score, Giyani: Land of Blood and Die Sentrum.

=== Series ===
SABC 2 has previously broadcast international series such as NCIS, Pretty Little Liars, Teen Wolf and The Vampire Diaries. The channel currently focuses on local reality and factual programming, including Speak Out, Relate and Saving Our Marriage, as well as comedies such as Ga Re Dumele and Ke Ba Bolleletse. A few international series, such as American Ninja Warrior, are also broadcast.

=== Talk and magazine ===
The channel airs a small number of talk, travel and magazine-style programmes, including Motswako, Vusaseki, Nhlalala ya Rixaka, 50/50, Voetspore and TalkAbility.

=== Music ===
SABC 2 features local Afro-soul and pop music interludes between programmes. Its music shows include Afro Café, Soul'd Out Sessions, Kliphard, Musiek Roulette and Noot vir Noot.

=== Religion ===
The channel broadcasts religious programming aimed at Christian, Jewish and Hindu audiences. Local shows include the long-running It's Gospel Time, Gospel Classics, Psalted, Simcha, Derech Eretz and Issues of Faith.

=== Sports ===
SABC 2 rarely broadcasts live sports due to funding constraints and instead focuses on sporting highlights. Its sports coverage mainly features boxing, rugby, swimming and athletics. In recent years, the channel has also aired several football matches, including Bafana Bafana, Banyana Banyana and CAF Champions League games.

=== News and current affairs ===
The channel provides two primetime news bulletins in TshiVenda/xiTsonga and Sotho/Setswana/Sepedi. It also broadcasts current affairs programmes such as Ngula Ya Vutivi, Zwa Maramani and Leihlo La Sechaba, as well as the long-running breakfast show Morning Live. SABC 2 is known for its coverage of major national events, including presidential inaugurations, the State of the Nation Address, budget speeches and parliamentary proceedings. On 4 March 2024, the Afrikaans news bulletin was moved to SABC 3, airing Mondays to Fridays at 20:30 and weekends at 18:15.

=== Movies ===
SABC 2 is recognised for broadcasting family-friendly films, dramas, autobiographies and animated movies.

=== Youth and education ===
SABC 2 carries a range of educational content from the SABC Education slate, including Takalani Sesame, It's For Life and The Epic Hangout. The channel also features programmes focusing on financial literacy, senior citizens and children's entertainment. It airs selected Disney Junior programmes in either their original English version or dubbed into South African languages, such as The Lion Guard in isiZulu, Ben 10 in Afrikaans and Doc McStuffins in Sotho.

For teens and pre-teens, the channel offers comedy and adventure series from Disney Channel and Nickelodeon, including iCarly, True Jackson, VP, A.N.T. Farm, Sanjay and Craig, The Sparticle Mystery, Star Falls and Cookabout. Local youth-oriented shows include Signal High, Snake Park and Hectic Nine-9.

The 17:00 slot is particularly popular among younger audiences for its anime programming, featuring series from Toei Animation, Studio Pierrot and TV Tokyo. Notable titles have included Yu-Gi-Oh!, Yu-Gi-Oh! GX, Yu-Gi-Oh! 5D's, Yu-Gi-Oh! ARC-V, Beyblade, Dragon Ball, Dragon Ball Z, Dragon Ball Z Kai, Dragon Ball GT, Dragon Ball Super, Naruto Shippuden, One Piece and Bleach.

== List of programmes ==
=== Imported programmes ===
==== Current ====
===== Children's =====
- (United States) Rhyme Time Town

==== Former ====
===== Children's =====
- (United States) 101 Dalmatians
- (United States) 3-2-1 Penguins!
- (Canada) 6teen
- (United States) Action Man
- (Australia) The Adventures of Blinky Bill
- (United States) Adventures of the Gummi Bears
- (United Kingdom) The Adventures of Portland Bill
- (Canada) The Adventures of the Aftermath Crew
- (United States) Alvin and the Chipmunks
- (United States) Aladdin
- (United States) (Mexico) Amigo and Friends (In both Afrikaans and English)
- (United Kingdom) Animaland
- (United Kingdom) (Russia) (Spain) (United States) (Wales) (Scotland) Animated Tales of the World
- (Canada) Anna Banana
- (United Kingdom) (Canada) (United States) Anthony Ant (In Afrikaans)
- (United Kingdom) (France) Archibald the Koala
- (United States) (Canada) Arthur
- (United States) A.J.'s Time Travelers
- (United Kingdom) Barney
- (United States) Bear in the Big Blue House
- (United Kingdom) Bertha
- (United Kingdom) (Canada) The Big Garage (In Sepedi)
- (France) (Belgium) (Canada) Billy the Cat
- (United States) Blue's Clues
- (United Kingdom) The Blunders
- (United Kingdom) Bob the Builder
- (Spain) Bobobobs (In Afrikaans)
- (United States) Bonkers
- (United Kingdom) Boohbah
- (Canada) Bookmice
- (Canada) Braceface
- (United Kingdom) Brambly Hedge
- (United States) The Brothers Flub
- (United Kingdom) Brum (In both Afrikaans and English)
- (United Kingdom) Budgie the Little Helicopter
- (United Kingdom) Bump
- (United States) (France) (Canada) The Busy World of Richard Scarry
- (New Zealand) Buzz and Poppy
- (United States) Buzz Lightyear of Star Command
- (United States) Captain Planet and the Planeteers
- (Canada) Captain Power and the Soldiers of the Future
- (United States) Chip 'N Dale Rescue Rangers
- (United States) The Crayon Box
- (United States) Darkwing Duck
- (United States) Dave the Barbarian
- (United Kingdom) Dennis and Gnasher
- (United Kingdom) Dig & Dug with Daisy
- (United States) (Canada) (Singapore) Dinosaur Train
- (United States) (Canada) Dog City
- (France) Dog Tracer
- (United States) Doug
- (United States) DuckTales
- (United States) Earthworm Jim
- (United Kingdom) Enid Blyton's Enchanted Lands
- (United States) Even Stevens
- (United States) Fantastic Four
- (United States) Festival of Family Classics
- (Wales) Fireman Sam
- (United States) Fillmore!
- (United Kingdom) The Forgotten Toys
- (United Kingdom) Fourways Farm (In Xhosa)
- (United States) Fudge
- (United Kingdom) (Wales) Funnybones
- (United States) (Canada) (France) Gadget Boy & Heather
- (United States) Garfield and Friends
- (United States) Gargoyles
- (United States) Ghostbusters
- (United States) Goof Troop
- (Canada) The Happy Castle
- (United States) Hercules
- (United Kingdom) The Hot Rod Dogs and Cool Car Cats (In Afrikaans, English and Tswana)
- (United States) House of Mouse
- (United States) The Incredible Hulk
- (United Kingdom) Jellabies
- (United Kingdom) Jimbo and the Jet-Set
- (Australia) Johnson and Friends
- (United Kingdom) Junglies
- (United States) Jungle Cubs
- (Australia) Kaboodle
- (Canada) Katie and Orbie (In Zulu)
- (United States) Kim Possible
- (United Kingdom) Kipper
- (United States) Kissyfur
- (Canada) Kitty Cats
- (Canada) Kleo the Misfit Unicorn (In Tswana)
- (United Kingdom) The Legends of Treasure Island
- (United States) The Legend of Tarzan
- (United States) The Little Mermaid
- (United States) Lloyd in Space
- (United States) Lizzie McGuire
- (United States) Lilo & Stitch
- (United States) Marsupilami
- (Japan) Medabots
- (United Kingdom) (United States) (Canada) Magic Adventures of Mumfie (In both Afrikaans and English)
- (Canada) (France) Mona the Vampire
- (United Kingdom) Monty the Dog who wears glasses (In Sepedi)
- (United Kingdom) The Morph Files
- (United States) Mighty Ducks
- (Canada) (Denmark) Mumble Bumble
- (France) (Japan) The Mysterious Cities of Gold
- (United States) The New Adventures of Winnie the Pooh
- (Canada) (Germany) Ned's Newt
- (United States) Nightmare Ned
- (United Kingdom) Noddy's Toyland Adventures
- (United Kingdom) Oakie Doke (In Xhosa)
- (United Kingdom) Old Bear Stories
- (France) (Italy) Orson and Olivia (In Afrikaans)
- (Canada) (Belgium) Ovide and the Gang (In Afrikaans)
- (United Kingdom) Peppa Pig
- (United States) Pepper Ann
- (Australia) Petals
- (United Kingdom) (Switzerland) Pingu
- (United States) Popeye and Son
- (Japan) Pokémon
- (United Kingdom) Postman Pat
- (United Kingdom) Press Gang
- (United States) Princess Gwenevere and the Jewel Riders
- (Australia) Pugwall's Summer
- (Italy) Quaq Quao
- (United States) Quack Pack
- (United Kingdom) The Raggy Dolls
- (United States) (Canada) (Germany) The Rainbow Fish
- (United Kingdom) Renford Rejects
- (United States) Recess
- (Canada) (France) Robinson Sucroe
- (United States) Rocko's Modern Life (In Afrikaans)
- (United Kingdom) Rosie and Jim
- (United States) Rugrats
- (United States) (Canada) Salty's Lighthouse
- (Japan) Samurai Pizza Cats
- (United Kingdom) The Sarah Jane Adventures
- (United States) Shining Time Station
- (United Kingdom) The Shoe People
- (Australia) Skippy: Adventures in Bushtown
- (United Kingdom) The Slow Norris (In Afrikaans)
- (United Kingdom) Spheriks
- (United States) Spider-Man
- (United States) SpongeBob SquarePants
- (Spain) Supermodels
- (United States) TaleSpin
- (Poland) Teddy Drop Ear
- (United Kingdom) Teddy Trucks (In Afrikaans)
- (United States) Teacher's Pet
- (United States) Teamo Supremo
- (United Kingdom) Titch
- (United States) Timon & Pumbaa
- (Canada) Toad Patrol
- (United Kingdom) Tots TV
- (Japan) Transformers: Armada
- (Japan) Transformers: Energon
- (United Kingdom) Truckers
- (United Kingdom) Tube Mice
- (United Kingdom) Victor & Hugo: Bunglers in Crime (In Afrikaans)
- (United States) The Weekenders
- (Canada) What About Mimi?
- (United Kingdom) (United States) Where's Wally?
- (United Kingdom) The Wild House
- (United States) The Wild Thornberrys
- (Canada) Wimzie's House
- (United Kingdom) The World of Peter Rabbit and Friends
- (United States) X-Men

===== Comedy =====
- (United States) ALF (In Afrikaans)
- (United States) The Critic
- (United States) The Nanny
- (United States) The Sinbad Show
- (United States) The Tony Danza Show
- (United States) Who's the Boss?

===== Drama =====
- (Canada) (France) Counterstrike
- (United States) Dallas
- (United States) Dellaventura
- (United States) Magnum, P.I.
- (United States) Miami Vice (In Afrikaans)
- (United States) (New Zealand) Xena: Warrior Princess

===== Magazine =====
- (United Kingdom) Cybernet

===== Soap opera =====
- (United States) As the World Turns

===== Documentary =====
- (United States) Story of a People

===== Talk shows =====
- (United States) The Dr. Phil Show

== See also ==
- List of South African media
- List of South African television channels
