= SABC Encore =

- Country: South Africa
- Broadcast area: South Africa
- Network: SABC
- Headquarters: SABC Television Park, Uitsaaisentrum, Johannesburg, South Africa

Programming
- Language: English
- Picture format: 16:9 (576i, SDTV)

Ownership
- Owner: South African Broadcasting Corporation
- Sister channels: SABC 1 SABC 2 SABC 3 SABC News; SABC Lehae; SABC Education; SABC Sport; SABC Children

History
- Launched: 11 May 2015; 10 years ago
- Closed: 1 June 2020; 5 years ago

Links
- Website: www.sabcencore.co.za

SABC Encore was a 24-hour free-to-air digital satellite and digital terrestrial television retro rerun channel created and owned by the South African Broadcasting Corporation, as a carriage deal between the SABC and Multichoice. This channel stopped airing at midnight on 1 June 2020 after MultiChoice's decision not to renew the channel once its contract had come to an end and was seemingly revived through DTT.

== History ==
The channel first came up as SABC Africa until it was discontinued back in 2008 in which it was not viable due to poor performance.

SABC signed a 5 year agreement with MultiChoice and in that agreement it included a news channel which launched in 2013 and entertainment channel which was delayed due to the switch from analogue to digital television. The channel was set to launch as SABC Entertainment which never materialized in November 2013 then was delayed to the fall of 2014.

In 2015, SABC Encore launched on DStv through the family package and a few weeks later on the Easyview package.

On 20 May 2020, it was announced that a longstanding partner of the MultiChoice Group, the channel would be ceasing broadcast in Africa at 00:30 on 1 June 2020 and it would no longer be available from 1 June of that year. It was revealed by SABC that both parties ended their agreement back in 2018 and that the agreement was non-renewable and gave the channel a two-year extension. Even though the channel is discontinued SABC mentioned they are looking at ways to possibly continue the channel through another platform and mentioned it again in 2021 through an interview on SAfm Radio. The brand was seemingly revived through DTT for a memorial service.

== Programming ==
See also: List of dramas produced by the SABC, List of variety shows produced by the SABC and List of children and youth programs produced by the SABC

The terminated channel showcased vintage South African comedies, dramas, kiddies and lifestyle shows from the 1980s and 1990s, including iconic titles such as 'Sgudi 'Snaysi, Agter Elke Man, Interster, Ubambo Lwami, Pumpkin Patch, Haas Das en Nuuskas, Dikolong and Hlala Kwabafileyo, among many others.

== Controversies ==
At the channel's launch event, the COO of SABC at the time used that event to rant about making pay-tv platforms like MultiChoice's DStv pay for SABC 1-3 and how the SABC is run by a 'blind person'. He also took the stage to call out those with their 'lack of knowledge' over the deal the public broadcaster has for the channel alongside SABC News.
