= Daantjie Rossouw =

South African rugby union player

- Born: Daniël Hendrik Rossouw; 5 September 1930 Upington, Northern Cape, South Africa
- Died: 28 January 2010 (aged 79) Mossel Bay, Western Cape, South Africa
- Height: 1.71 m (5 ft 7 in)
- Weight: 69 kg (152 lb)
- School: Hoërskool Jan van Riebeeck, Cape Town
- University: University of Pretoria, Stellenbosch University

Rugby union career
- Position: Centre
Provincial / State sides
| Years | Team | Apps | (Points) |
| 1950–1952 | Northern Transvaal | | |
| 1953–1955 | Western Province | | |
International career
| Years | Team | Apps | (Points) |
| 1953 | South Africa | 2 | (3) |

Daniël Hendrik 'Daantjie' Rossouw (5 September 1930 – 28 January 2010) was a South African rugby union player.

== Playing career ==
Rossouw finished his schooling at the Hoërskool Jan van Riebeeck in Cape Town, where after he moved to Pretoria to study at the University of Pretoria. He joined the University's rugby club and made his provincial debut for Northern Transvaal. In 1953, Rossouw relocated to Stellenbosch to further his law studies at Stellenbosch University and was he selected to represent Western Province.

Rossouw made his test debut for the Springboks in the third test match against the touring Australian team, captained by John Solomon on 19 September 1953 at Kingsmead in Durban. Rossouw's selection for this third test match was as a replacement for Tjol Lategan, who injured his shoulder in the previous test. He also played in the fourth test against the Australians and was set to continue as Springbok centre in the upcoming series against the British Lions. However, he decided to retire from rugby in the mid –1955, at a relatively young age of not yet twenty–five. Rossouw scored one test try for the Springboks.

=== Test history ===
| No. | Opposition | Result (SA 1st) | Position | Tries | Date | Venue |
|---|---|---|---|---|---|---|
| 1. | Australia | 18–8 | Centre | 1 | 19 September 1953 | Kingsmead, Durban |
| 2. | Australia | 22–9 | Centre | | 26 September 1953 | Crusaders Ground, Port Elizabeth |

== See also ==
- List of South Africa national rugby union players – Springbok no. 309
