= SABC Africa =

SABC Africa was the international television service of the South African Broadcasting Corporation, which ceased broadcasting on 1 August 2008 after poor performance on the DStv satellite television platform.

The channel started on 16 November 1998 as part of an initial two-channel agreement by the SABC with Multichoice for the whole of Africa, being initially positioned as a news channel. SABC Africa was carried on both C-band and Ku-band systems while its sister channel, Best of Africa (later Africa2Africa) was only carried on Ku-band to southern Africa. Using the structure of SABC News, SABC Africa asserted the SABC's position and ambition of being a "totally African broadcaster", reducing its reliance on foreign news agencies. Its founding director was Allister Sparks, whose ambitions included plans to compete head-to-head with CNN for African news coverage.

The two channels were officially launched on 25 August 2000. The channel had half-hour news bulletins on the hour while the remaining half-hour was given to other programmes, among them Today in Africa, Ambassadors, Perspective and Talking Sport.

The SABC's radio service Channel Africa continues to operate.
