= SABC 1 =

South African television channel

- Country: South Africa
- Broadcast area: South Africa
- Network: SABC
- Headquarters: SABC Television Park, Uitsaaisentrum, Johannesburg, South Africa

Programming
- Languages: English and Nguni
- Picture format: 1080i HDTV (downscaled to 576i for the SDTV feed)

Ownership
- Owner: SABC
- Sister channels: SABC 2; SABC 3; SABC News; SABC Lehae; SABC Education; SABC Sport; SABC Encore; SABC Children

History
- Launched: 31 December 1981 (as TV2/3); March 1985 (TV4); January 1992 (TV2/3/4 merged into CCV); 4 February 1996 (as SABC 1)
- Replaced: SABC TV / SAUK-TV
- Former names: TV2/TV3 (1981-1992); CCV (1992-1996)

Links
- Website: www.sabc1.co.za

Availability

Terrestrial
- Sentech: SABC DTT Channel 1
- DStv: Channel 191
- OpenView: Channel 101

Streaming media
- SABC Plus OTT: SABC Plus
- DStv Now: Channel 191

SABC 1 is a South African public television network operated by the South African Broadcasting Corporation (SABC). It broadcasts programming in English and Nguni languages.

SABC 1 was established in 1996 following the SABC's restructuring of its television channels. Much of its programming was carried over from the TV1 network, which had itself been formed from the timeshared channels TV2, TV3, and TV4 in the 1980s. SABC 1 attracts the largest audience in South Africa due to its diverse programming, including SABC's longest-running soap opera, Generations: The Legacy, as well as Uzalo and Skeem Saam.

As of June 2018, the channel began broadcasting in high definition.

== History ==
=== Initial TV Bantu plan ===
When the SABC was granted approval to launch a television service in 1971, it was initially planned to have two channels: TV One, broadcasting in English and Afrikaans for white audiences, and TV Bantu, broadcasting in Bantu languages for black audiences. However, when television was eventually introduced in South Africa, the SABC launched only one channel—SABC TV—which aligned with the planned TV One service. By 1976, the plan for the black channel has been scheduled for 1980.

=== As the combined TV2/TV3 network and TV4 ===
In 1980, the SABC announced plans to introduce a network for Black South Africans by 1982. The service was intended to broadcast for three hours on weekdays, with extended hours on weekends. Similar to SABC TV, it would be funded through a combination of advertising revenue and government grants.

On 31 December 1981, two new services were launched: TV2, which broadcast in Zulu and Xhosa, and TV3, which broadcast in Sotho and Tswana. Both channels were aimed at an urban Black audience and operated on a timeshared frequency. The main network, now called TV1, continued to divide its programming equally between English and Afrikaans, as it had before. Both TV2 and TV3 also included selected programmes in English, as the language remained a lingua franca for urban Black audiences and was the preferred language for many print media outlets targeting this demographic. The channel had a gala opening, unlike SABC TV (TV1 from then) which had a simpler launch. From 31 December 1982, the TV2 and TV3 services split to cater to language groups: TV2 for the Nguni areas (Zulu and Xhosa) and TV3 for the Sotho areas (Sotho, Northern Sotho and Tswana). TV2 had a limited coverage area on its own, being dotted to a few coastal cities in the Republic proper (including Cape Town) and the northeast, while TV3 broadcast in the more populous inland area, which also included parts of Bophuthatswana. In Johannesburg, both TV2 and TV3 were carried. The coverage map of the services depended on factors such as areas with electricity, as well as large concentration of the target languages. Both channels produced children's programming in the local languages, as well as dubs of foreign animated series such as Rabobi, a dub of the 1960s Spider-Man cartoon in the Zulu language, seen on TV2.

In 1985, a new service called TV4 was introduced, offering sports and entertainment programming. It utilised the same frequency as TV2 and TV3, which ceased broadcasting at 9:30 pm each evening. Such a starting time (later brought forward to 9pm) was based on the government's belief that the black audience of TV2/TV3 was expected to be asleep when TV4 started. Moreover, The Cosby Show, formerly seen on TV1, moved to TV4. By 1991, the two networks (TV2 and TV3) merged with TV4, creating TV2/3/4, adding more imported entertainment during pre-9pm hours, unbalancing the black programming.

=== As CCV ===
In 1992, TV2, TV3, and TV4 were merged into a single unified network called CCV (Contemporary Community Values), operating on the same frequency as TV2. A third network, known as TSS (TopSport Surplus), was also introduced, with TopSport serving as the SABC's brand for sports coverage. TSS used the same frequency as TV3. However, in 1994, TSS was replaced by NNTV (National Network TV), a cultural, non-commercial network. The channel adopted Join Our World as its slogan.

=== As SABC 1 ===
In 1996, the SABC reorganised its three television networks to better reflect South Africa's diverse ethnolinguistic groups. The networks were rebranded as SABC 3 (originally TV1), SABC 1 (originally TV2 then CCV-TV), and SABC 1 (originally TV3). SABC 1 took over the former CCV network, offering programming in English alongside several national languages. At the time of the rebranding, prime-time programming (18:00 to 21:30) comprised 29% English, 18% Zulu, 18% Xhosa, 1% Siswati, and 1% isiNdebele, with the remaining third dedicated to "multilingual programming" in two or more languages.

The relaunched SABC 1 marked the first time Siswati and isiNdebele were featured on national television.

The relaunch happened on all three networks on 4 February followed by a full-time change on 5 February.

On 1 December 1997, SABC 1 introduced a new channel identity used since its 1996 relaunch, while continuing to use Simunye as its slogan.

The channel introduced a new identity at 5pm on 18 August 2003, presenting itself as Ya Mampela (The Real Thing), aiming to solidify its position among an increasingly urban viewing audience. A controversial race reversal advertisement (PF Jones) appeared to tie in with the relaunch, over time, false information had emerged online that the advert was banned. The slogan was seen with criticism from Zulu king Goodwill Zwelithini, who in February 2005 wanted the channel to ditch the phrase citing "improper use" of the Zulu language. The controversial PF Jones advert, with the channel's slogan appearing at the end, was dropped in the wake of the language controversy.

== Programming ==
SABC 1 is heavily focused on local entertainment targeted at the youth.

=== Soapies, dramas and telenovelas ===
The channel has been known as 'Mzansi's Storyteller' due to its popular local dramas, including the well-known soap operas Generations: The Legacy, Uzalo, and Skeem Saam. Other notable dramas from past years include Yizo Yizo, Zone 14, Mfolozi Street, Intersexions, and The Shakespeare in Mzansi Series, among others. However, in recent years, this title has been adopted by Mzansi Magic.

=== Series ===
The channel features a variety of comedy shows, game shows, and reality series, including Nyan'Nyan, Now or Never, It Takes a Village, Plate it up, The next big thing, Ses' Top La, Friends Like These, The Remix, Lip Sync Battle, and Deal or No Deal. Initially, the channel had the rights to broadcast local versions of international franchises like The X Factor, but due to financial constraints, it now focuses primarily on local reality competitions.

=== Music ===
The channel airs some of the latest local urban music and playlists on shows like Live Amp and Koze Kuse, while also focusing on traditional indigenous music on shows like Roots and choral music on one of its longest-running shows, Imizwilili.

=== Talk and magazine ===
SABC 1 airs local informative magazine shows, ranging from its longest-running magazine show, Selimathunzi, to more recent and fresh shows like Throwback Thursday and weekend breakfast shows like Mzansi Insider, among others. Additionally, SABC 1 hosts interactive talk shows such as Daily Thetha and The Chatroom.

=== Religion ===
On a daily basis, the channel showcases short religious shows catering to traditional African religions, Christianity, Judaism and Islam. On weekends, it features religious music shows such as Gospel Avenue and Imvelo.

=== News and current affairs ===
The channel has two bulletins: one for SiSwati/isiNdebele speakers and another for IsiZulu/IsiXhosa speakers. In addition, it includes current affairs programmes such as Cutting Edge, Expressions, and Yilungelo Lakho.

=== Sports ===
SABC1 airs Premier Soccer League (PSL) matches during the weekend and also holds broadcasting rights for other football events such as the Africa Cup of Nations, the FIFA World Cup, and Bafana Bafana And Banyana Banyana international friendlies.

However, in August 2019, the channel could not afford the broadcast rights to the PSL season, resulting in a blackout of sports on both TV and radio platforms and the suspension of match broadcasts for a period. This angered soccer fans who did not have access to SuperSport on DStv, as MultiChoice held the sports rights. Sports Minister Nathi Mthethwa and Communications Minister Stella Ndabeni-Abrahams announced that, following a meeting with the public broadcaster's board and MultiChoice, a resolution had been reached, and soccer matches resumed as normal.

=== Movies ===
The network airs classic action, horror, drama, comedy, sci-fi, adventure, thriller, romance, and fantasy movies on certain weekends. SABC 1 also broadcasts Kicking Kung Fu movies on Fridays.

=== Children and education ===
SABC 1 features some foreign children's programming, mostly from Disney Junior. In addition, it airs the longest-running local kids' show, YoTV, which broadcasts five times a week and once every weekend. The channel also offers shows under its SABC Education banner that cater to all ages, such as the high school revision show Geleza Nathi and career-focused shows like Ispani and Teenagers on A Mission.

=== Generations 2014 Incident ===
This occurred on 31 October 2014 when 16 actors were fired. Due to in a shortage of R500 million (South African rand), Generations aired from 1993 to 2014. From the 30 September to 30 November 2014, the series went on to an indefinite hiatus.

== See also ==
- SABC
