= SABC 3 =

South African television channel

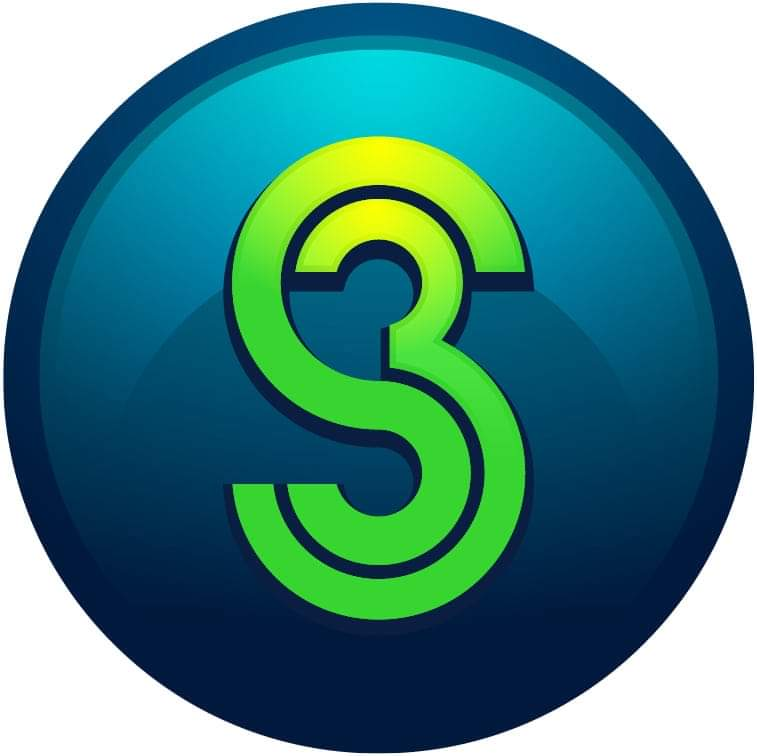
- Country: South Africa
- Broadcast area: South Africa
- Network: SABC
- Headquarters: SABC Television Park, Uitsaaisentrum, Johannesburg, South Africa

Programming
- Languages: English, Afrikaans
- Picture format: 1080i HDTV (downscaled to 576i for the SDTV feed)

Ownership
- Owner: SABC
- Sister channels: SABC 1; SABC 2; SABC News; SABC Lehae; SABC Education; SABC Sport; SABC Encore; SABC Children

History
- Launched: October 1991 (as NNTV); 4 February 1996 (as SABC 3)
- Replaced: TopSport Surplus (TSS)
- Former names: National Network Television (NNTV) (1991-1996)

Links
- Website: www.sabc3.com

Availability

Terrestrial
- Sentech: SABC DTT Channel 3
- DStv: Channel 193
- OpenView: Channel 103

Streaming media
- SABC Plus OTT: SABC Plus
- DStv Now: Channel 193

SABC 3, also branded as S3, is a South African free-to-air television channel owned by the South African Broadcasting Corporation (SABC). As of 2023, it carries most of the SABC's programming in English.

== History ==
The SABC introduced a third network known as TSS, or TopSport Surplus, TopSport being the brand name for the SABC's sport coverage, in October 1991. The channel accommodated sporting events that could not be seen on TV1 as an overflow service. This was replaced by NNTV (National Network TV), an educational, non-commercial channel, in February 1994.

In 1996, the SABC reorganised its three TV channels with the aim of making them more representative of the various language groups. These new channels were called SABC 1, SABC 2 and SABC 3.

SABC3 inherited many of its programs from TV1, South Africa's apartheid-era "white" channel. SABC 3 is targeted at South Africa's affluent English-speaking community; the channel's primary target market is viewers aged 18 to 49. It screens a combination of international programming from the United States and United Kingdom, as well as locally produced soap operas, talk shows and drama series. SABC 3's new format stemmed largely from a 1997 decision to commercialise the broadacaster, reducing the amount of documentary content that it previously broadcast since the days of NNTV. The new line-up was driven by ratings.

SABC 3 moved its main news from 8pm to 7pm on 7 April 2003. It was rumoured that the new time was to compete with e.tv's main bulletin, which was on at the same time, but these rumours were denied by Jimi Matthews, who had moved from the rival broadcaster.

The channel's HD broadcasts began on 11 June 2018, in time for the 2018 FIFA World Cup, alongside SABC 1. As of June 2018, the channel started broadcasting in high definition.

In April 2021, the channel rebranded and is stylised as S3.

== Programming ==
SABC 3 has deals with studio companies in the US and various television networks in the UK to air some series with a few months' delay from their international airdates.

=== Soapies, dramas and telenovelas ===
The channel is known for its longest-running soapie Isidingo, and previously aired local dramas such as High Rollers, and popular international soaps Days of Our Lives and The Bold and the Beautiful, which SABC 3 stopped airing because of financial constraints. This upset viewers fond of the soapie and started a petition to keep the show running. The channel currently offers international dramas such as Knightfall, NCIS, House of Cards, MotherFatherSon, Line of Duty, El Chapo, and Killing Eve. In April 2021, the channel introduced a new local drama The Estate and new telenovelas Orphans Of A Nation, The Bay and The Red Room.

=== Children and education ===
The channel has local children's content such as Challenge SOS, Talent on Track, Yum.Me and Hectic on 3, along with and international catalogue of kids and teens entertainment from Disney, Cartoon Network and Nickelodeon. This includes kids shows such as Mickey Mouse Clubhouse, Go Jetters and My Friends Tigger & Pooh, as well as teen shows such as Victorious, iCarly, Wizards of Waverly Place, Shake It Up, Cory in the House, Girl Meets World, Sam & Cat, Looney Tunes, Violetta, Polly Pocket, Kuu Kuu Harajuku, Young Justice, Ben 10, Henry Danger, Nowhere Boys, Noah & Saskia, Spellbinder, Spellbinder: Land of the Dragon Lord, Mortified, Legacy of the Silver Shadow, Crash Zone and Dexter's Laboratory. Unlike its sister channels, SABC 3 has less programming from the SABC Education banner.

=== Series ===
SABC 3 used to license and produce local versions of international series like The Apprentice, The Weakest Link, and Top Chef. The South African adaptions of The Apprentice and The Weakest Link have been off air and out of production for longer than 10 years.

In 2017, Hlaudi Motsoeneng who was then COO of the SABC, decreed that SABC TV stations should broadcast 90% local content. The decree turned out to be unsuccessful, as the local productions were the least watched on the channel. After some time, their flagship international series returned, such as Survivor and The Amazing Race. The channel currently has reality series such as Judge Faith, Ready for Love and Christina Milian:Turned up. The channel also offers nature documentaries from National Geographic and BBC Earth.

In March 2024, SABC 3 announced a partnership with BBC Studios, under which it would broadcast a nightly block on weeknights known as BBC PRIMETIME beginning 1 May, which would feature airings of dramas and factual programmes from its library. The agreement also includes streaming content on SABC+.

=== Music ===
The channel also focuses on adult contemporary and urban music and has music specials from local and international artists. Shows like The Mic, Base 3 and Tapestry are aired on the channel. SABC 3 broadcasts Koze Kuse from SABC 1 from August 2019 to April 2021.

=== Talk and magazine ===
SABC 3 has a heavy focus on local and international talk and magazines such as the breakfast show Expresso, Afternoon Express, The Real, The Scoop and Harry.

=== Sports ===
SABC 3 broadcasts All Cricket South Africa Inbound Tours Of The Proteas Men's Team. It Also Broadcasts The Bundesliga On Weekends, Women's Super League, The Sasol League And The Hollywoodbets Super League. It Also Broadcasts LFC TV On It's Sports Show Sports Arena Including WSB Horseracing, Formula E, FIA WRC, Extreme E And Sports Highlights. The Channel Also Provides Overflow Space For CAF Competitions And Premier Soccer League Matches. It recently started broadcasting the Premier League.

=== News and current affairs ===
SABC 3 serves the bulletin news for English speakers, simulcasting news broadcasts with their SABC NEWS CHANNEL for On Point, Monday to Friday @ 13:00. It also broadcasts PRIME NEWS on 3 in English, Monday to Friday @ 18:00. SABC 3 also broadcast international news content like CNN International, BBC World, Deutsche Welle & DW News in English.

=== Movies ===
The channel provides action, horror, drama, comedy, sci-fi, adventure, thriller, romance and fantasy movies during primetime. SABC 3 is well known for broadcasting popular Bollywood movies in their original Hindi & Tamil soundtrack. In April 2020 on Saturdays & Sundays @ 23:30 - 05:00, SABC 3 broadcasts M-Net Movies that was recorded on a VHS Tape Recorder from 2005.

== See also ==
- List of South African media
