= Sentech =

Signal distributor for the South African broadcasting sector

Sentech SOC Ltd
- Formerly: Sentech Pty Ltd
- Type: State-owned company
- Industry: Telecoms
- Incorporated: 1992; 34 years ago
- Founded: 1992; 34 years ago
- Founder: South African Broadcasting Corporation (SABC)
- Headquarters: Johannesburg, Gauteng, South Africa
- Area served: South Africa
- Key people: Tebogo Leshope (CEO)
- Services: Broadcasting signal distribution Broadband connectivity Satellite communications Digital infrastructure Managed infrastructure services
- Revenue: ▲ R1.62 billion (2026)
- Operating income: ▲ − R141 million (2026)
- Net income: ▲ − R60 million (2026)
- Total assets: ▲ R4.34 billion (2025)
- Total equity: ▼ R2.39 billion (2025)
- Owner: Government of South Africa
- Number of employees: 621 (2026)
- Divisions: Media; Broadband; Satellite; Managed Infrastructure
- Website: sentech.co.za

Sentech is the signal distributor for the South African broadcasting sector. A state-owned company, Sentech was founded in 1992, and is based in Johannesburg, Gauteng.

== Background ==
Sentech began operations in 1992 as the signal distributor of the South African Broadcasting Corporation (SABC). Sentech's mandate also included providing services to M-Net, Radio 702, Radio Ciskei, Radio Transkei and the Bophuthatswana Broadcasting Corporation.

However, in its Triple Inquiry report that was published in August 1995, the Independent Broadcasting Authority (IBA) recommended that Sentech should be split from the SABC and that Sentech become a public company. This report was approved by the South African Parliament in March 1996 and the Sentech Act to implement these measures was adopted by Parliament in November of the same year.

Sentech now operates as a commercial enterprise owned by the Government of South Africa via the Department of Communications and has its own board of directors.

From 2021 Sentech covers many areas of the country by Digital Terrestrial Television or Direct-to-Home platform

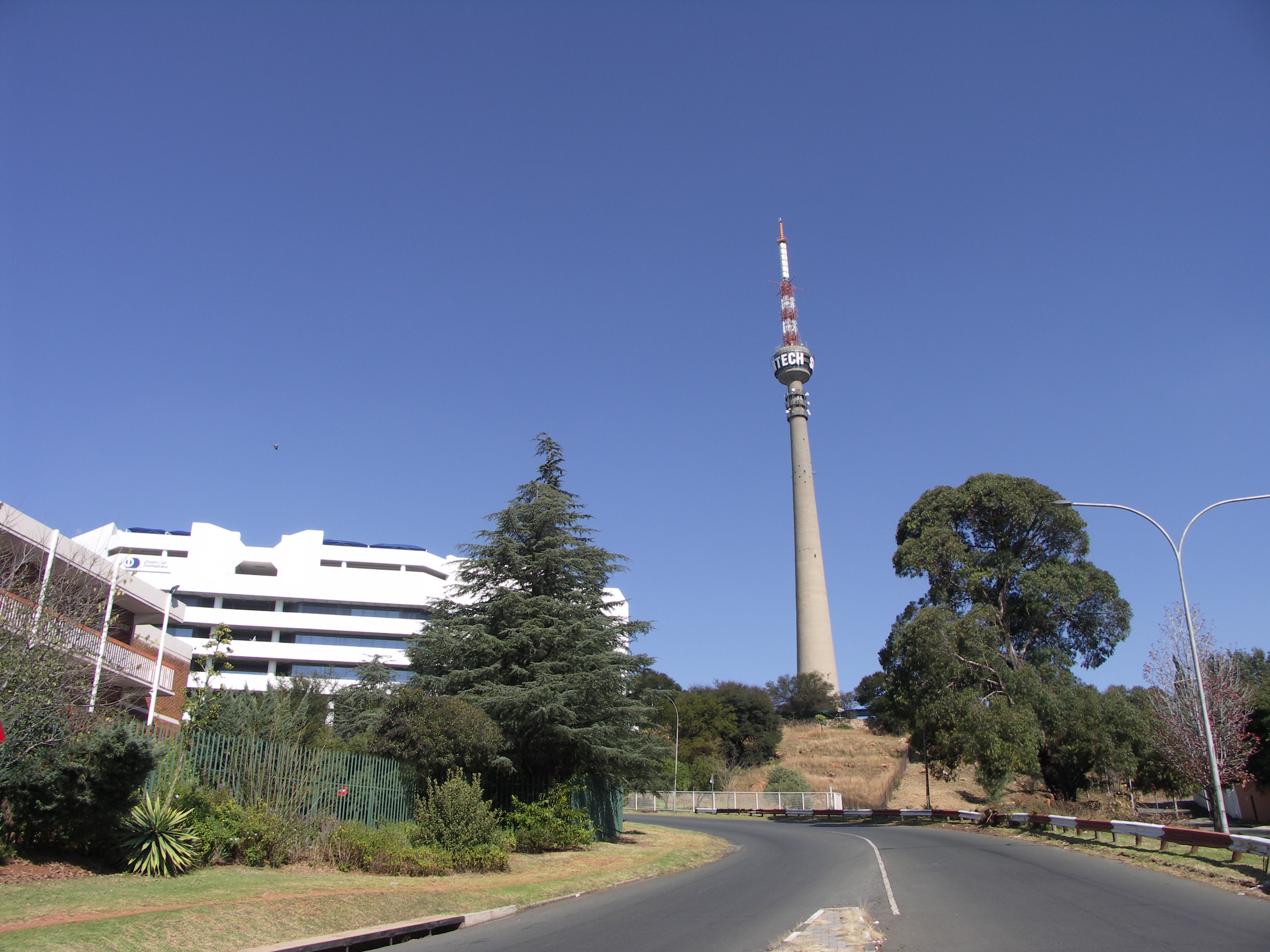
The Sentech Tower in Brixton, Johannesburg

== Main radio/TV sites ==
Province	Historical Province	Location	Height of tower	Transmitter Coordinates
Eastern Cape	Cape Province	Aliwal North	143 m	30°47′6″S 26°33′58″E
Western Cape	Cape Province	Beaufort West	204 m	32°15′30″S 22°30′23″E
Eastern Cape	Cape Province	Bedford	143 m	32°37′57″S 26°2′56″E
Free State	Orange Free State	Bethlehem	174 m	28°14′12″S 28°29′57″E
Free State	Orange Free State	Bloemfontein	204 m	29°6′13″S 26°13′47″E
Free State	Orange Free State	Boesmanskop	235 m	30°0′28″S 27°12′53″E
Eastern Cape	Cape Province	Butterworth	235 m	32°16′35″S 28°12′24″E
Northern Cape	Cape Province	Calvinia	213.5 m	31°23′3″S 19°46′56″E
Western Cape	Cape Province	Cape Town (Constantiaberg)	146 m	34°3′16″S 18°23′12″E
Northern Cape	Cape Province	Carnarvon	244 m	30°54′15″S 22°22′27″E
Mpumalanga	Transvaal	Carolina (The Brook)	213.5m	26°10′27″S 30°38′6″E
North West Province	Transvaal	Christiana	233 m	27°53′4″S 24°55′47″E
Eastern Cape	Cape Province	Cradock	174 m	32°18′2″S 25°32′26″E
Mpumalanga	Transvaal	Davel	265 m	26°27′32″S 29°37′25″E
Northern Cape	Cape Province	De Aar	204 m	30°27′50″S 23°59′13″E
KwaZulu-Natal	Natal	Donnybrook	122 m	29°54′58″S 29°51′18″E
Northern Cape	Cape Province	Douglas	242 m	29°4′8″S 23°31′43″E
Mpumalanga	Transvaal	Dullstroom		25°34′23″S 30°11′16″E
KwaZulu-Natal	Natal	Durban (Alverstone)	247 m	29°46′12″S 30°43′0″E
Eastern Cape	Cape Province	East London	204 m	32°56′21″S 27°48′55″E
KwaZulu-Natal	Natal	Eshowe	143 m	28°51′32″S 31°17′35″E
Northern Cape	Cape Province	Faans Grove	146 m	27°6′0″S 22°24′16″E
Northern Cape	Cape Province	Garies	213.5 m	30°18′53″S 18°4′40″E
Western Cape	Cape Province	George	143 m	33°55′39″S 22°27′1″E
KwaZulu-Natal	Natal	Glencoe (Fort Mistake)	143 m	28°9′5″S 29°56′51″E
Eastern Cape	Cape Province	Graaff Reinet		32°4′48″S 24°26′59″E
Eastern Cape	Cape Province	Grahamstown	204 m	33°17′15″S 26°42′30″E
KwaZulu-Natal	Natal	Greytown	174 m	29°0′47″S 30°32′9″E
Limpopo	Transvaal	Hoedspruit		24°32′32″S 30°52′7″E
Gauteng	Transvaal	Johannesburg	237 m	26°11′33″S 28°0′25″E
Eastern Cape	Cape Province	Kareedouw		34°1′30″S 24°25′47″E
Northern Cape	Cape Province	Kimberley	235 m	28°51′15″S 24°54′17″E
Eastern Cape	Cape Province	King William's Town (Keiskammahoek)	174 m	32°40′48″S 27°15′36″E
North West Province	Transvaal	Klerksdorp (Hartbeesfontein)	265 m	26°45′15″S 26°24′28″E
Free State	Orange Free State	Kroonstad	235 m	27°25′17″S 27°11′7″E
Northern Cape	Cape Province	Kuruman Hills	241 m	27°53′13″S 23°33′37″E
Free State	Orange Free State	Ladybrand	174 m	29°10′19″S 27°22′41″E
Limpopo	Transvaal	Louis Trichardt	143 m	23°0′5″S 29°45′27″E
Eastern Cape	Cape Province	Matatiele	213.5 m	30°23′47″S 28°49′15″E
Western Cape	Cape Province	Matjiesfontein	143 m	33°16′54″S 20°30′17″E
Mpumalanga	Transvaal	Middelburg	244 m	25°49′6″S 29°23′23″E
KwaZulu-Natal	Natal	Mooi River	174 m	29°11′9″S 29°52′3″E
Eastern Cape	Cape Province	Mount Ayliff	137 m	30°50′14″S 29°23′41″E
Western Cape	Cape Province	Napier (Bredasdorp)	143 m	34°31′46″S 19°53′33″E
Mpumalanga	Transvaal	Nelspruit		25°30′57″S 30°46′33″E
KwaZulu-Natal	Natal	Nongoma	183 m	27°54′19″S 31°39′26″E
Eastern Cape	Cape Province	Noupoort	174 m	31°18′14″S 24°55′59″E
Western Cape	Cape Province	Oudtshoorn	143 m	33°40′17″S 22°16′1″E
Free State	Orange Free State	Petrus Steyn	235 m	27°31′1″S 28°19′6″E
Mpumalanga	Transvaal	Piet Retief	265 m	27°1′13″S 30°41′2″E
Western Cape	Cape Province	Piketberg	174 m	32°49′9″S 18°44′17″E
Eastern Cape	Cape Province	Port Elizabeth	204 m	33°56′10″S 25°26′27″E
KwaZulu-Natal	Natal	Port Shepstone	204 m	30°44′8″S 30°17′16″E
Limpopo	Transvaal	Potgietersrus		24°9′26″S 29°14′9″E
Gauteng	Transvaal	Pretoria	113 m	25°41′22″S 27°59′2″E
Northern Cape	Cape Province	Prieska	244 m	29°40′54″S 22°36′55″E
Eastern Cape	Cape Province	Queenstown	143 m	31°43′58″S 26°47′3″E
Western Cape	Cape Province	Riversdale	143 m	34°1′8″S 21°7′39″E
North West Province	Transvaal	Rustenburg	113 m	25°36′59″S 27°7′5″E
North West Province	Transvaal	Schweizer-Reneke	265 m	27°8′10″S 25°13′7″E
Free State	Orange Free State	Senekal	235 m	28°15′21″S 27°30′25″E
Northern Cape	Cape Province	Springbok	241 m	29°35′4″S 17°48′26″E
Free State	Orange Free State	Springfontein	143 m	30°16′15″S 25°46′7″E
Eastern Cape	Cape Province	Suurberg	204 m	33°14′55″S 25°34′27″E
Limpopo	Transvaal	Thabazimbi	183 m	24°28′2″S 27°36′50″E
Free State	Orange Free State	Theunissen	265 m	28°11′56″S 26°34′48″E
Limpopo	Transvaal	Tzaneen (Houtbosdorp)		23°47′7″S 30°0′16″E
KwaZulu-Natal	Natal	Ubombo		27°33′44″S 32°4′50″E
Eastern Cape	Cape Province	Umtata	235 m	31°35′49″S 28°44′36″E
Northern Cape	Cape Province	Upington	244 m	28°52′58″S 21°44′11″E
Western Cape	Cape Province	Vanrhynsdorp	183 m	31°45′16″S 18°41′21″E
Western Cape	Cape Province	Villiersdorp	143 m	33°58′10″S 19°30′22″E
Mpumalanga	Transvaal	Volksrust	174 m	27°18′36″S 29°53′15″E
KwaZulu-Natal	Natal	Vryheid	143 m	27°44′29″S 30°47′37″E
Gauteng	Transvaal	Welverdiend	143 m	26°26′49″S 27°14′53″E
North West Province	Transvaal	Zeerust (Ottoshoop)	264 m	25°51′38″S 26°2′50″E

== See also ==
- List of tallest structures in South Africa
