= List of comedy films of the 1990s =

This is a list of comedy films released in the 1990s.

== 1990 ==
Comedy films of 1990
Title	Director	Cast	Production country	Genre
The Adventures of Ford Fairlane	Renny Harlin	Andrew Dice Clay, Priscilla Presley, Wayne Newton	United States	Action Comedy
Air America	Roger Spottiswoode	Mel Gibson, Robert Downey Jr., Nancy Travis	United States	Action Comedy
Alice	Woody Allen	Mia Farrow, Joe Mantegna, Alec Baldwin	United States	Fantasy Romantic Comedy
All for the Winner	Jeffrey Lau, Corey Yuen	Stephen Chow, Cheung Man, Chow Yun-Fat	Hong Kong	
Another 48 Hrs.	Walter Hill	Nick Nolte, Eddie Murphy, Brion James, Tisha Campbell	United States	Action Comedy
Arachnophobia	Frank Marshall	Jeff Daniels, Harley Jane Kozak, John Goodman	United States	Horror comedy
Back to the Future Part III	Robert Zemeckis	Michael J. Fox, Christopher Lloyd, Mary Steenburgen	United States	Science fiction Western Comedy
Basket Case 2	Frank Henenlotter	Kevin Van Hentenryck, Annie Ross, Kathryn Meisle	United States	Horror comedy
Betsy's Wedding	Alan Alda	Alan Alda, Molly Ringwald, Madeline Kahn, Ally Sheedy	United States	
Bird on a Wire	John Badham	Mel Gibson, Goldie Hawn, David Carradine	United States	Action Comedy
The Bonfire of the Vanities	Brian De Palma	Tom Hanks, Melanie Griffith, Bruce Willis	United States	
Cadillac Man	Roger Donaldson	Robin Williams, Tim Robbins, Pamela Reed	United States	
Coupe de Ville	Joe Roth	Patrick Dempsey, Arye Gross, Daniel Stern	United States	Comedy-Drama
Crazy People	Tony Bill	Dudley Moore, Daryl Hannah, David Paymer	United States	
Cry-Baby	John Waters	Johnny Depp, Amy Locane, Susan Tyrrell	United States	Musical Romantic Comedy
Daddy's Dyin': Who's Got the Will?	Jack Fisk	Beau Bridges, Beverly D'Angelo, Tess Harper	United States	Comedy-Drama
Dick Tracy	Warren Beatty	Warren Beatty, Al Pacino, Charlie Korsmo, Glenne Headly	United States	Action Crime Comedy
Don't Tell Her It's Me	Malcolm Mowbray	Steve Guttenberg, Shelley Long, Jami Gertz	United States	
Downtown	Richard Benjamin	Anthony Edwards, Forest Whitaker, Penelope Ann Miller	United States	Action Comedy
DuckTales the Movie: Treasure of the Lost Lamp	Bob Hathcock	Alan Young, Russi Taylor, Rip Taylor	United States	Animated film
Ernest Goes to Jail	John Cherry	Jim Varney, Gailard Sartain, Bill Byrge	United States	
Far Out Man	Tommy Chong	Tommy Chong, Rae Dawn Chong, Shelby Chong, Paris Chong	United States	
Flashback	Franco Amurri	Dennis Hopper, Kiefer Sutherland, Carol Kane	United States	
Frankenhooker	Frank Henenlotter	Patty Mullen, Charlotte Helmkamp, Shirley Stoler	United States	Horror Comedy
The Freshman	Andrew Bergman	Matthew Broderick, Marlon Brando, Bruno Kirby	United States	
Funny About Love	Leonard Nimoy	Gene Wilder, Christine Lahti, Mary Stuart Masterson	United States	Romantic Comedy
Ghost Dad	Sidney Poitier	Bill Cosby, Kimberly Russell, Denise Nicholas	United States	Fantasy Comedy
Green Card	Peter Weir	Gérard Depardieu, Andie MacDowell, Bebe Neuwirth	United States	Romantic Comedy-Drama
Gremlins 2: The New Batch	Joe Dante	Zach Galligan, Phoebe Cates, John Glover	United States	Horror Comedy
The Hairdresser's Husband	Patrice Leconte	Jean Rochefort, Anna Galiena, Henry Hocking	France	
Halfaouine: Boy of the Terraces	Ferid Boughedir	Mustafa Adouani, Rabia Ben Abdallah	Tunisia; France	
Heart Condition	James D. Parriott	Bob Hoskins, Denzel Washington, Lisa Stahl Sullivan	United States	
Home Alone	Chris Columbus	Macaulay Culkin, Joe Pesci, Daniel Stern	United States	
House Party	Reginald Hudlin	Christopher Reid, Christopher Martin, Robin Harris, Tisha Campbell, Martin Lawrence, Full Force	United States	
I Bought a Vampire Motorcycle	Dirk Campbell	Neil Morrissey, Michael Elphick, Anthony Daniels	United Kingdom	Horror Comedy
I Hired a Contract Killer	Aki Kaurismäki	Jean-Pierre Léaud, Margi Clarke, Kenneth Colley	Finland; Sweden	
I Love You to Death	Lawrence Kasdan	Kevin Kline, Tracey Ullman, Joan Plowright	United States	
In the Spirit	Sandra Seacat	Elaine May, Marlo Thomas, Jeannie Berlin	United States	
Jetsons: The Movie	William Hanna, Joseph Barbera	George O'Hanlon, Penny Singleton, Tiffany Darwish, Patric Zimmerman, Don Messick, Jean Vander Pyl, Mel Blanc	United States	Animated Science Fiction Film
Joe Versus the Volcano	John Patrick Shanley	Tom Hanks, Meg Ryan, Lloyd Bridges	United States	Romantic Comedy
Kindergarten Cop	Ivan Reitman	Arnold Schwarzenegger, Penelope Ann Miller, Pamela Reed	United States	
Life Is Sweet	Mike Leigh	Alison Steadman, Jim Broadbent, Timothy Spall	United Kingdom	Comedy-Drama
Look Who's Talking Too	Amy Heckerling	John Travolta, Kirstie Alley, Olympia Dukakis	United States	
Loose Cannons	Bob Clark	Gene Hackman, Dan Aykroyd, Dom DeLuise	United States	Action Comedy
Madhouse	Tom Ropelewski	John Larroquette, Kirstie Alley, Jessica Lundy	United States	
A Man Called Sarge	Stuart Gillard	Gary Kroeger, Marc Singer, Jennifer Runyon	United States	
May Fools	Louis Malle	Michel Piccoli, Miou-Miou, Michel Duchaussoy	France	
Men at Work	Emilio Estevez	Emilio Estevez, Charlie Sheen, Leslie Hope	United States	
Mermaids	Richard Benjamin	Cher, Winona Ryder, Christina Ricci, Bob Hoskins	United States	Comedy-Drama
Metropolitan	Whit Stillman	Edward Clements, Allison Rutledge-Parisi, Dylan Hundley	United States	Comedy-Drama
Modern Love	Robby Benson	Robby Benson, Karla Devito, Rue McClanahan, Burt Reynolds	United States	
Movie... In Your Face	Tommy Sledge		Hong Kong; United States	
Mr. Destiny	James Orr	Michael Caine, James Belushi, Linda Hamilton	United States	Fantasy Comedy
My Blue Heaven	Herbert Ross	Steve Martin, Rick Moranis, Joan Cusack	United States	
My New Partner II	Claude Zidi	Philippe Noiret, Thierry Lhermitte, Guy Marchand	France	
Ninja Academy	Nico Mastorakis	Will Egan, Kelly Randall, Gerald Okamura	United States	
Nuns on the Run	Jonathan Lynn	Eric Idle, Robbie Coltrane, Camille Coduri	United Kingdom	
Opportunity Knocks	Donald Petrie	Dana Carvey, Robert Loggia, Todd Graff	United States	
Postcards from the Edge	Mike Nichols	Meryl Streep, Shirley MacLaine, Dennis Quaid	United States	Comedy-Drama
Pretty Woman	Garry Marshall	Richard Gere, Julia Roberts, Ralph Bellamy	United States	Romantic Comedy
Problem Child	Dennis Dugan	John Ritter, Michael Oliver, Amy Yasbeck	United States	
Quick Change	Howard Franklin, Bill Murray	Bill Murray, Geena Davis, Randy Quaid	United States	
Repossessed	Bob Logan	Linda Blair, Leslie Nielsen, Anthony Starke	United States	Horror Comedy
Rosencrantz & Guildenstern Are Dead	Tom Stoppard	Gary Oldman, Tim Roth, Richard Dreyfuss	United Kingdom	
A Shock to the System	Jan Egleson	Michael Caine, Elizabeth McGovern, Peter Riegert	United States	
Short Time	Gregg Champion	Dabney Coleman, Matt Frewer, Teri Garr	United States	
The Shrimp on the Barbie	Michael Gottlieb	Emma Samms, Cheech Marin, Vernon Wells	Australia	
Sibling Rivalry	Carl Reiner	Kirstie Alley, Bill Pullman, Carrie Fisher	United States	
Spaced Invaders	Patrick Read Johnson	Royal Dano, Ariana Richards, J.J. Anderson	United States	Science Fiction Comedy
The Spirit of '76	Lucas Reiner	David Cassidy, Olivia D'Abo, Geoff Hoyle	United States	
Taking Care of Business	Arthur Hiller	James Belushi, Charles Grodin, Anne de Salvo	United States	
Tatie Danielle	Etienne Chatiliez	Tsila Chelton, Catherine Jacob, Isabelle Nanty	France	
Teenage Mutant Ninja Turtles	Steven Barron	Judith Hoag, Elias Koteas, Josh Pais	United States	Action Comedy
Three Men and a Little Lady	Emile Ardolino	Tom Selleck, Steve Guttenberg, Ted Danson	United States	
Tremors	Ron Underwood	Kevin Bacon, Fred Ward, Finn Carter	United States	Horror Comedy
Trust	Hal Hartley	Adrienne Shelly, Martin Donovan, Merritt Nelson	United States	Comedy-Drama
Tune in Tomorrow	Jon Amiel	Peter Falk, Keanu Reeves, Barbara Hershey	United States	
Uranus	Claude Berri	Philippe Noiret, Gérard Depardieu, Jean-Pierre Marielle	France	Comedy-Drama
Welcome Home, Roxy Carmichael	Jim Abrahams	Winona Ryder, Jeff Daniels, Laila Robins	United States	Comedy-Drama
Where the Heart Is	John Boorman	Dabney Coleman, Uma Thurman, Joanna Cassidy	United States	Romantic Comedy
Why Me?	Gene Quintano	Christopher Lambert, Christopher Lloyd, Kim Greist	United States	
Wild at Heart	David Lynch	Nicolas Cage, Laura Dern, Diane Ladd	United States	Black comedy
The Witches	Nicolas Roeg	Anjelica Huston, Mai Zetterling, Jasen Fisher	United States	Fantasy Horror Comedy

== 1991 ==
Comedy films of 1991
Title	Director	Cast	Production country	Genre
The Addams Family	Barry Sonnenfeld	Anjelica Huston, Raul Julia, Christopher Lloyd	United States	
Age Isn't Everything	Douglas Katz	Jonathan Silverman, Robert Prosky, Rita Moreno	United States	
All I Want for Christmas	Robert Lieberman	Harley Jane Kozak, Jamey Sheridan, Thora Birch	United States	
An American Tail: Fievel Goes West	Phil Nibbelink, Simon Wells	Phillip Glasser, Jimmy Stewart, Dom Deluise	United States	Animated film
And You Thought Your Parents Were Weird	Tony Cookson	Joshua Miller, Edan Gross, Marcia Strassman	United States	
Another You	Maurice Phillips	Richard Pryor, Gene Wilder, Mercedes Ruehl	United States	
Armour of God II: Operation Condor	Jackie Chan	Jackie Chan, Carol Cheng, Eva Cobo	Hong Kong	Action comedy, adventure comedy
Barton Fink	Joel Coen	John Turturro, John Goodman, Judy Davis	United States	Comedy-Drama
Bill & Ted's Bogus Journey	Peter Hewitt	Keanu Reeves, Alex Winter, Joss Ackland	United States	
Bingo	Matthew Robbins	Cindy Williams, David Rasche, David French	United States	
The Butcher's Wife	Terry Hughes	Demi Moore, Jeff Daniels, George Dzundza	United States	Fantasy Romantic Comedy
Career Opportunities	Bryan Gordon	Jennifer Connelly, Frank Whaley, Dermot Mulroney	United States	
City Slickers	Ron Underwood	Billy Crystal, Daniel Stern, Bruno Kirby	United States	
Critters 3	Kristine Peterson	Aimee Brooks, John Calvin, Katherine Cortez	United States	Horror Comedy
Curly Sue	John Hughes	James Belushi, Kelly Lynch, Alisan Porter	United States	Comedy-Drama
The Dark Backward	Adam Rifkin	Judd Nelson, Bill Paxton, Wayne Newton	United States	
Defending Your Life	Albert Brooks	Albert Brooks, Meryl Streep, Rip Torn	United States	
Delicatessen	Marc Caro, Jean-Pierre Jeunet	Dominique Pinon, Marie-Laure Dougnac, Jean-Claude Dreyfus	France	
Delirious	Tom Mankiewicz	John Candy, Mariel Hemingway, Emma Samms	United States	
Doc Hollywood	Michael Caton-Jones	Michael J. Fox, Julie Warner, Woody Harrelson	United States	
Don't Tell Mom the Babysitter's Dead	Stephen Herek	Christina Applegate, Joanna Cassidy, John Getz	United States	
Drop Dead Fred	Ate de Jong	Phoebe Cates, Rik Mayall, Marsha Mason	United States	
Dutch	Peter Faiman	Ed O'Neill, Ethan Embry, JoBeth Williams, Christopher McDonald	United States	
The Elementary School	Jan Svěrák	Jan Tříska, Zdeněk Svěrák, Rudolf Hrušínský	Czechoslovakia	Comedy-Drama
Ernest Scared Stupid	John Cherry	Jim Varney, Austin Nagler, Shay Astar	United States	
Fast Getaway	Spiro Razatos	Corey Haim, Cynthia Rothrock, Leo Rossi	United States	Action Comedy
Father of the Bride	Charles Shyer	Steve Martin, Diane Keaton, Martin Short	United States	
The Favour, the Watch and the Very Big Fish	Ben Lewin	Bob Hoskins, Jeff Goldblum, Natasha Richardson	United Kingdom	
The Fisher King	Terry Gilliam	Robin Williams, Jeff Bridges, Mercedes Ruehl	United States	Fantasy Comedy-Drama
Frankie and Johnny	Garry Marshall	Al Pacino, Michelle Pfeiffer, Hector Elizondo	United States	Romantic Comedy-Drama
Fried Green Tomatoes	Jon Avnet	Kathy Bates, Jessica Tandy, Mary Stuart Masterson	United States	Comedy-Drama
The Hard Way	John Badham	Michael J. Fox, James Woods, Annabella Sciorra	United States	Action Comedy
Hear My Song	Peter Chelsom	Ned Beatty, Adrian Dunbar, David McCallum	Ireland; United Kingdom	Comedy-Drama
Highway 61	Bruce McDonald	Don McKellar, Valerie Buhagiar, Earl Pastko	Canada	
Hot Shots!	Jim Abrahams	Charlie Sheen, Valeria Golino, Cary Elwes	United States	
House Party 2	George Jackson, Doug McHenry	Christopher Reid, Christopher Martin, Tisha Campbell, Martin Lawrence, Queen Latifah	United States	
Hudson Hawk	Michael Lehmann	Bruce Willis, Danny Aiello, Andie MacDowell	United States	
If Looks Could Kill	William Dear	Richard Grieco, Linda Hunt, Roger Rees	United States	Action Comedy
Johnny Stecchino	Roberto Benigni	Roberto Benigni, Nicoletta Braschi, Paolo Bonacelli	Italy	
King Ralph	David S. Ward	John Goodman, Peter O'Toole, John Hurt	United States	
L.A. Story	Mick Jackson	Steve Martin, Victoria Tennant, Richard E. Grant	United States	
Life Stinks	Mel Brooks	Mel Brooks, Lesley Ann Warren, Jeffrey Tambor	United States	
Livin' Large	Michael Schultz	Terrence "T.C." Carson, Lisa Arrindell Anderson, Blanche Baker	United States	
Mannequin Two: On the Move	Stewart Raffill	William Ragsdale, Kristy Swanson, Meshach Taylor	United States	
Mediterraneo	Gabriele Salvatores	Diego Abatantuono, Claudio Bigagli, Giuseppe Cederna	Italy	Comedy-Drama
Meet the Applegates	Michael Lehmann	Ed Begley Jr., Stockard Channing, Robert Jayne, Camille Cooper	United States	
Mystery Date	Jonathan Wacks	Ethan Hawke, Teri Polo, Brian McNamara	United States; United States	Romantic Comedy
The Naked Gun 2½: The Smell of Fear	David Zucker	Leslie Nielsen, Priscilla Presley, George Kennedy	United States	
Necessary Roughness	Stan Dragoti	Scott Bakula, Hector Elizondo, Robert Loggia	United States	
Night on Earth	Jim Jarmusch	Gena Rowlands, Winona Ryder, Giancarlo Esposito	United States	Comedy-Drama
Nothing but Trouble	Dan Aykroyd	Chevy Chase, Dan Aykroyd, Demi Moore	United States	
Only the Lonely	Chris Columbus	John Candy, Maureen O'Hara, Ally Sheedy	United States	Romantic Comedy-Drama
Oscar	John Landis	Sylvester Stallone, Ornella Muti, Peter Riegert	United States	
Other People's Money	Norman Jewison	Danny DeVito, Gregory Peck, Penelope Ann Miller	United States	Comedy-Drama
The People Under the Stairs	Wes Craven	Brandon Adams, Everett McGill, Wendy Robie	United States	
Popcorn	Mark Herrier	Jill Schoelen, Tom Villard, Dee Wallace Stone	United States	
The Pope Must Die	Peter Richardson	Robbie Coltrane, Beverly D'Angelo, Herbert Lom	United Kingdom	
Problem Child 2	Brian Levant	John Ritter, Michael Oliver, Amy Yasbeck	United States	
Proof	Jocelyn Moorhouse	Hugo Weaving, Russell Crowe, Heather Mitchell	Australia	Romantic Comedy-Drama
Pure Luck	Nadia Tass	Martin Short, Danny Glover, Sheila Kelly	United States	
Rover Dangerfield	Jim George, Bob Seeley	Rodney Dangerfield, Susan Boyd, Ronnie Schell	United States	Animated Film
Scenes from a Mall	Paul Mazursky	Bette Midler, Woody Allen	United States	
Sgt. Kabukiman N.Y.P.D.	Michael Herz, Lloyd Kaufman	Rick Gianasi, Susan Byun, Bill Weeden	United States	
Shadows and Fog	Woody Allen	Woody Allen, Mia Farrow, John Malkovich	United States	
Slacker	Richard Linklater	Richard Linklater, Mark James, Stella Weir	United States	Comedy-Drama
Soapdish	Michael Hoffman	Sally Field, Kevin Kline, Robert Downey Jr.	United States	
Sólo Con Tu Pareja	Alfonso Cuarón	Luis De Icaza, Regina Orozco, Rodolfo Arias	Mexico	
Strictly Business	Kevin Hooks	Tommy Davidson, Joseph C. Phillips, Anne-Marie Johnson	United States	
Suburban Commando	Burt Kennedy	Hulk Hogan, Christopher Lloyd, Shelley Duvall	United States	
The Super	Rod Daniel	Joe Pesci, Vincent Gardenia, Madolyn Smith	United States	
Surviving Desire	Hal Hartley	Martin Donovan, Mary Ward, Rebecca Nelson	United States	Comedy-Drama
Switch	Blake Edwards	Ellen Barkin, Jimmy Smits, JoBeth Williams	United States	
Talkin' Dirty After Dark	Topper Carew	Martin Lawrence, John Witherspoon, Jedda Jones	United States	
Teenage Mutant Ninja Turtles II: The Secret of the Ooze	Michael Pressman	Paige Turco, David Warner, Michelan Sisti	United States	Action comedy
Toto the Hero	Jaco van Dormael	Michel Bouquet, Jo de Backer, Thomas Godet	Belgium; France; Germany	Comedy-Drama
V.I. Warshawski	Jeff Kanew	Kathleen Turner, Jay O. Sanders, Charles Durning	United States	Mystery Comedy
What About Bob?	Frank Oz	Bill Murray, Richard Dreyfuss, Julie Hagerty	United States	

== 1992 ==
Comedy films of 1992
Title	Director	Cast	Production country	Genre
3 Ninjas	Jon Turteltaub	Victor Wong, Michael Treanor, Max Elliott Slade	United States	Action comedy
Army of Darkness	Sam Raimi	Bruce Campbell, Embeth Davidtz, Marcus Gilbert	United States	Fantasy comedy
Bebe's Kids	Bruce W. Smith	Faizon Love, Vanessa Bell Calloway, Marques Houston, Jonell Green, Tone Lōc, Wayne Collins Jr.	United States	Animated film
Beethoven	Brian Levant	Charles Grodin, Bonnie Hunt, Dean Jones	United States	
Belle Époque	Fernando Trueba	Penélope Cruz, Gabino Diego, Fernando Fernán Gómez	Spain	Comedy-Drama
Big Girls Don't Cry... They Get Even	Joan Micklin	Hillary Wolf, Griffin Dunne, Margaret Whitton	United States	
Blame it on the Bellboy	Mark Herman	Bronson Pinchot, Dudley Moore, Richard Griffiths	United States	
Bob Roberts	Tim Robbins	Tim Robbins, Giancarlo Esposito, Alan Rickman	United States; United Kingdom	
Boomerang	Reginald Hudlin	Eddie Murphy, Halle Berry, Robin Givens	United States	
Boris and Natasha: The Movie	Charles Martin Smith	Corey Burton, John Calvin, John Candy	United States	
Brain Donors	Dennis Dugan	John Turturro, Bob Nelson, Mel Smith	United States	
Braindead	Peter Jackson	Timothy Balme, Elizabeth Moody, Ian Watkin	New Zealand	
Buffy the Vampire Slayer	Fran Rubel Kuzui	Kristy Swanson, Donald Sutherland, Rutger Hauer	United States	
Captain Ron	Thom Eberhardt	Kurt Russell, Martin Short, Mary Kay Place	United States	
Class Act	Randall Miller	Christopher Reid, Christopher Martin, Alysia Rogers	United States	
Cool World	Ralph Bakshi	Kim Basinger, Gabriel Byrne, Brad Pitt	United States	Fantasy comedy
The Cutting Edge	Paul Michael Glaser	D.B. Sweeney, Moira Kelly, Roy Dotrice	United States	Comedy-Drama
Death Becomes Her	Robert Zemeckis	Meryl Streep, Bruce Willis, Goldie Hawn	United States	
Diggstown	Michael Ritchie	James Woods, Louis Gossett Jr., Bruce Dern	United States	Comedy-Drama
The Distinguished Gentleman	Jonathan Lynn	Eddie Murphy, Lane Smith, Sheryl Lee Ralph	United States	
Enchanted April	Mike Newell	Miranda Richardson, Joan Plowright, Alfred Molina	United Kingdom; United States	Comedy-Drama
Encino Man	Les Mayfield	Sean Astin, Pauly Shore, Brendan Fraser	United States	
Frozen Assets	George T. Miller	Shelley Long, Corbin Bernsen, Larry Miller	United States	
The Gun in Betty Lou's Handbag	Allan Moyle	Penelope Ann Miller, Eric Thal, Julianne Moore	United States	
Hero	Stephen Frears	Dustin Hoffman, Geena Davis, Andy Garcia	United States	Comedy-Drama
Home Alone 2: Lost in New York	Chris Columbus	Macaulay Culkin, Joe Pesci, Daniel Stern	United States	
Honey, I Blew Up the Kid	Randal Kleiser	Rick Moranis, Marcia Strassman, Lloyd Bridges	United States	
Honeymoon in Vegas	Andrew Bergman	James Caan, Nicolas Cage, Sarah Jessica Parker	United States	
HouseSitter	Frank Oz	Steve Martin, Goldie Hawn, Dana Delany	United States	
Husbands and Wives	Woody Allen	Woody Allen, Blythe Danner, Judy Davis	United States	Comedy-Drama
In the Soup	Alexandre Rockwell	Steve Buscemi, Seymour Cassel, Jennifer Beals	United States	
Innocent Blood	John Landis	Anne Parillaud, Robert Loggia, Anthony LaPaglia	United States	Horror Comedy
Kuffs	Bruce A. Evans	Christian Slater, Tony Goldwyn, Milla Jovovich	United States	Action Comedy
Ladybugs	Sidney J. Furie	Rodney Dangerfield, Jonathan Brandis, Ilene Graff	United States	
A League of Their Own	Penny Marshall	Geena Davis, Tom Hanks, Lori Petty	United States	Comedy-Drama
Leap of Faith	Richard Pearce	Steve Martin, Debra Winger, Lolita Davidovich	United States	Comedy-Drama
Léolo	Jean-Claude Lauzon	Maxime Collin, Ginette Reno, Roland Blouin	Canada; France	Comedy drama
Love Potion No. 9	Dale Launer	Tate Donovan, Sandra Bullock, Dale Midkiff	United States	
Man Trouble	Bob Rafelson	Jack Nicholson, Ellen Barkin, Beverly D'Angelo	United States	
Medusa: Dare to Be Truthful	Julie Brown, John Fortenberry	Julie Brown, Chris Elliott, Carol Leifer	United States	
Memoirs of an Invisible Man	John Carpenter	Chevy Chase, Daryl Hannah, Sam Neill	United States	
The Mighty Ducks	Stephen Herek	Emilio Estevez, Joss Ackland, Lane Smith	United States	
Minbo	Juzo Itami	Nobuko Miyamoto, Akira Takarada, Yasuo Daichi	Japan	Comedy-Drama
Mom and Dad Save the World	Greg Beeman	Teri Garr, Jeffrey Jones, Jon Lovitz	United States	Science Fiction Comedy
Mo' Money	Peter MacDonald	Damon Wayans, Marlon Wayans, Stacey Dash	United States	
Mr. Baseball	Fred Schepisi	Tom Selleck, Ken Takakura, Dennis Haysbert	United States	
Mr. Saturday Night	Billy Crystal	Billy Crystal, David Paymer, Julie Warner	United States	Comedy-Drama
My Cousin Vinny	Jonathan Lynn	Joe Pesci, Ralph Macchio, Marisa Tomei	United States	
Nervous Ticks	Rocky Lang	Bill Pullman, Julie Brown, Peter Boyle	United States	
Noises Off	Peter Bogdanovich	Carol Burnett, Michael Caine, Denholm Elliott	United States	
The Northerners	Alex van Warmerdam	Jack Wouterse, Rudolf Lucieer, Alex van Warmerdam	Netherlands	
Once upon a Crime	Eugene Levy	John Candy, James Belushi, Cybill Shepard	United States	
Only You	Betty Thomas	Andrew McCarthy, Kelly Preston, Helen Hunt	United States	
Out on a Limb	Francis Veber	Matthew Broderick, Heidi Kling, Jeffrey Jones, Courtney Peldon	United States	
Passed Away	Charlie Peters	Bob Hoskins, Blair Brown, Tim Curry	United States	
Peter's Friends	Kenneth Branagh	Kenneth Branagh, Alphonsia Emmanuel, Emma Thompson	United Kingdom	
The Player	Robert Altman	Tim Robbins, Greta Scacchi, Fred Ward, Whoopi Goldberg, Cynthia Stevenson	United States	
Police Story 3: Super Cop	Stanley Tong	Jackie Chan, Maggie Cheung, Tsang Kong	Hong Kong	Action comedy
Revenge of the Nerds III: The Next Generation	Roland Mesa	Robert Carradine, Ted McGinley, Gregg Binkley	United States	
Shakes the Clown	Bobcat Goldthwait	Bobcat Goldthwait, Julie Brown, Tom Kenny	United States	
Simple Men	Hal Hartley	Robert John Burke, Bill Sage, Karen Sillas	United States	Comedy drama
Singles	Cameron Crowe	Bridget Fonda, Campbell Scott, Kyra Sedgwick	United States	Comedy-Drama
Sister Act	Emile Ardolino	Whoopi Goldberg, Maggie Smith, Kathy Najimy	United States	
Sneakers	Phil Alden Robinson	Robert Redford, Dan Aykroyd, Ben Kingsley	United States	Crime Comedy-Drama
Stay Tuned	Peter Hyams	John Ritter, Pam Dawber, Jeffrey Jones	United States	
Stop! Or My Mom Will Shoot!	Roger Spottiswoode	Sylvester Stallone, Estelle Getty, JoBeth Williams	United States	
The Story of Qiu Ju	Zhang Yimou	Ge Zhijun, Lin Zi, Ye Jun	China; Hong Kong	Comedy-Drama
Straight Talk	Barnet Kellman	Dolly Parton, James Woods, Griffin Dunne	United States	
Strictly Ballroom	Baz Luhrmann	Paul Mercurio, Tara Morice, Bill Hunter	Australia	Comedy-Drama
There Goes the Neighborhood	Bill Phillips	Jeff Daniels, Catherine O'Hara, Hector Elizondo	United States	
This Is My Life	Nora Ephron	Julie Kavner, Samantha Mathis, Gaby Hoffmann	United States	Comedy-Drama
Tom and Jerry: The Movie	Phil Roman	Richard Kind, Dana Hill, Anndi McAfee, Charlotte Rae, Tony Jay, Henry Gibson, Michael Bell, Ed Gilbert	United States	Animated Film
Toys	Barry Levinson	Robin Williams, Robin Wright, Joan Cusack, LL Cool J., Michael Gambon	United States	
The Tune	Bill Plympton		United States	
Twin Dragons	Ringo Lam, Tsui Hark	Jackie Chan, Maggie Cheung, Nina Li Chi	Hong Kong	Action Comedy
Ultracop 2000	Philip Ko	Cynthia Luster, Philip Ko, Ricky Davao	Philippines; Hong Kong	Action comedy
La Vie de Bohème	Aki Kaurismäki	Matti Pellonpää, Evelyne Didi, André Wilms	Finland; France; Sweden	Comedy-Drama
Wayne's World	Penelope Spheeris	Mike Myers, Dana Carvey, Rob Lowe	United States	
White Men Can't Jump	Ron Shelton	Woody Harrelson, Wesley Snipes, Rosie Perez	United States	

== 1993 ==
Comedy films of 1993
Title	Director	Cast	Production country	Genre
Addams Family Values	Barry Sonnenfeld	Anjelica Huston, Raúl Juliá, Christopher Lloyd	United States	
Airborne	Rob Bowman	Seth Green, Brittney Powell, Chris Conrad	United States	Comedy-Drama
Amos & Andrew	E. Max Frye	Nicolas Cage, Samuel L. Jackson, Dabney Coleman	United States	Action Comedy
Another Stakeout	John Badham	Richard Dreyfuss, Emilio Estevez, Rosie O'Donnell	United States	Action Comedy
Arizona Dream	Emir Kusturica	Johnny Depp, Jerry Lewis, Faye Dunaway	France	Comedy-Drama
Bad Boy Bubby	Rolf de Heer	Nicholas Hope, Ralph Cotterill, Carmel Johnson	Australia; Italy	Comedy-Drama
Beethoven's 2nd	Rod Daniel	Charles Grodin, Bonnie Hunt, Nicholle Tom	United States	
Benny & Joon	Jeremiah S. Chechik	Johnny Depp, Mary Stuart Masterson, Aidan Quinn	United States	Romantic Comedy-Drama
The Beverly Hillbillies	Penelope Spheeris	Jim Varney, Diedrich Bader, Erika Eleniak, Cloris Leachman, Dabney Coleman, Lea Thompson	United States	
Born Yesterday	Luis Mandoki	Melanie Griffith, John Goodman, Don Johnson	United States	
CB4	Tamra Davis	Chris Rock, Allen Payne, Deezer D	United States	
City Hunter	Wong Jing	Jackie Chan, Joey Wang, Kumiko Goto	Hong Kong	Action Comedy
Cop and a Half	Henry Winkler	Burt Reynolds, Norman D. Golden II, Ruby Dee	United States	
Coneheads	Steven Barron	Tom Davis, Dan Aykroyd, Bonnie Turner	United States	
Cool Runnings	Jon Turteltaub	Leon, Doug E. Doug, Rawle D. Lewis	United States	
Cuisine et dépendances	Philippe Muyl	Zabou, Jean-Pierre Bacri, Agnès Jaoui	France	
Dave	Ivan Reitman	Kevin Kline, Sigourney Weaver, Frank Langella	United States	
Dazed and Confused	Richard Linklater	Jason London, Rory Cochrane, Wiley Wiggins	United States	Comedy-Drama
Demolition Man	Marco Brambilla	Sylvester Stallone, Wesley Snipes, Sandra Bullock	United States	Science fiction action comedy
Dennis the Menace	Nick Castle	Walter Matthau, Mason Gamble, Joan Plowright	United States	
Dottie Gets Spanked	Todd Haynes	Evan Bonifant, Barbara Garrick	United States	
The Double O Kid	Duncan McLachlan	Corey Haim, Brigitte Nielsen, Wallace Shawn	United States	
Ed and His Dead Mother	Jonathan Wacks	Steve Buscemi, Ned Beatty, Miriam Margolyes	United States	
Ernest Rides Again	John Cherry	Jim Varney, Ron James, Linda Kash	United States	
Even Cowgirls Get the Blues	Gus Van Sant	Uma Thurman, John Hurt, Rain Phoenix	United States	Romantic Comedy-Drama Western
Fatal Instinct	Carl Reiner	Armand Assante, Sherilyn Fenn, Kate Nelligan	United States	
Fong Sai-yuk	Corey Yuen	Jet Li, Josephine Siao, Michelle Reis	Hong Kong	Action Comedy
Fong Sai-yuk II	Corey Yuen	Jet Li, Josephine Siao, Adam Cheng	Hong Kong	Action Comedy
For Love or Money	Barry Sonnenfield	Michael J. Fox, Gabrielle Anwar, Anthony Higgins	United States	
Freaked	Tom Stern, Alex Winter	Alex Winter, Megan Ward, Michael Stoyanov	United States	
Golden Balls	J. J. Bigas Luna	Javier Bardem, Maribel Verdú, Maria de Medeiros	Spain	
Groundhog Day	Harold Ramis	Bill Murray, Andie MacDowell, Chris Elliott	United States	
Grumpy Old Men	Donald Petrie	Jack Lemmon, Walter Matthau, Ann-Margret	United States	
Heart and Souls	Ron Underwood	Robert Downey Jr., Charles Grodin, Alfre Woodard	United States	Fantasy Comedy-Drama
Hocus Pocus	Kenny Ortega	Bette Midler, Sarah Jessica Parker, Kathy Najimy	United States	
Hot Shots! Part Deux	Jim Abrahams	Charlie Sheen, Lloyd Bridges, Valeria Golino	United States	
Indian Summer	Mike Binder	Alan Arkin, Elizabeth Perkins, Matt Craven	United States	Comedy-Drama
Jack the Bear	Marshall Herskovitz	Robert J. Steinmiller Jr., Danny Devito, Miko Hughes, Gary Sinise	United States	Comedy-Drama
Kika	Pedro Almodóvar	Verónica Forqué, Peter Coyote, Victoria Abril	Spain	
Last Action Hero	John McTiernan	Arnold Schwarzenegger, Austin O'Brien, F. Murray Abraham	United States	Action Comedy
Life With Mikey	James Lapine	Michael J. Fox, Christina Vidal, Nathan Lane	United States	
Loaded Weapon 1	Gene Quintano	Emilio Estevez, Samuel L. Jackson, Jon Lovitz	United States	
Look Who's Talking Now	Tom Ropelewski	John Travolta, Kirstie Alley, Olympia Dukakis	United States	
Lost in Yonkers	Martha Coolidge	Richard Dreyfuss, Mercedes Ruehl, Irene Worth	United States	Comedy-Drama
Mad Dog and Glory	John McNaughton	Robert De Niro, Uma Thurman, Bill Murray	United States	Comedy-Drama
Made in America	Richard Benjamin	Whoopi Goldberg, Ted Danson, Nia Long	United States	
Manhattan Murder Mystery	Woody Allen	Woody Allen, Diane Keaton, Alan Alda	United States	Mystery Comedy
Manila Boy	Arturo San Agustin	Robin Padilla, Tony Ferrer, Aurora Sevilla	Philippines	Action comedy
Matinee	Joe Dante	John Goodman, Cathy Moriarty, Simon Fenton	United States	Comedy-Drama
The Meteor Man	Robert Townsend	Robert Townsend, Marla Gibbs, Eddie Griffin	United States	
Mrs. Doubtfire	Chris Columbus	Robin Williams, Sally Field, Pierce Brosnan	United States	
Much Ado About Nothing	Kenneth Branagh	Kenneth Branagh, Michael Keaton, Robert Sean Leonard	United Kingdom; United States	
My Boyfriend's Back	Bob Balaban	Andrew Lowery, Traci Lind, Danny Zorn	United States	Horror Comedy
Naked	Mike Leigh	David Thewlis, Lesley Sharp, Katrin Cartlidge	United Kingdom	Black comedy
The Night We Never Met	Warren Leight	Matthew Broderick, Annabella Sciorra, Kevin Anderson	United States	Romantic Comedy
The Positively True Adventures of the Alleged Texas Cheerleader-Murdering Mom	Michael Ritchie	Holly Hunter, Beau Bridges, Swoosie Kurtz	United States	
Robin Hood: Men in Tights	Mel Brooks	Cary Elwes, Richard Lewis, Roger Rees	United States	
Rookie of the Year	Daniel Stern	Gary Busey, Thomas Ian Nicholas, Albert Hall	United States	
The Sandlot	David Mickey Evans	Tom Guiry, Mike Vitar, Patrick Renna	United States	Sports Comedy
Sister Act 2: Back in the Habit	Bill Duke	Whoopi Goldberg, Kathy Najimy, Barnard Hughes	United States	Musical Comedy
Six Degrees of Separation	Fred Schepisi	Stockard Channing, Will Smith, Donald Sutherland	United States	Comedy-Drama
Sleepless in Seattle	Nora Ephron	Tom Hanks, Meg Ryan, Bill Pullman	United States	Romantic Comedy-Drama
Smoking/No Smoking	Alain Resnais	Sabine Azéma, Pierre Arditi	France	
The Snapper	Stephen Frears	Colm Meaney, Tina Kellegher, Ruth McCabe	Ireland	
So I Married an Axe Murderer	Thomas Schlamme	Mike Myers, Nancy Travis, Anthony LaPaglia	United States	
Son in Law	Steve Rash	Pauly Shore, Carla Gugino, Lane Smith	United States	
Son of the Pink Panther	Blake Edwards	Roberto Benigni, Herbert Lom, Debrah Farentino	United States	
Splitting Heirs	Robert Young	Rick Moranis, Eric Idle, Barbara Hershey	United Kingdom	
Surf Ninjas	Neal Israel	Rob Schneider, Nicolas Cowan, Leslie Nielsen	United States	Action Comedy
Teenage Mutant Ninja Turtles III	Stuart Gillard	Elias Koteas, Paige Turco, Stuart Wilson	United States	Action Comedy
Undercover Blues	Herbert Ross	Kathleen Turner, Dennis Quaid, Fiona Shaw	United States	
Les Visiteurs	Jean-Marie Poiré	Christian Clavier, Jean Reno, Valérie Lemercier	France	
Wayne's World 2	Stephen Surjik	Mike Myers, Dana Carvey, Christopher Walken	United States	
The Wedding Banquet	Ang Lee	Winston Chao, May Chin, Mitchell Lichtenstein	Taiwan	Comedy-Drama
Weekend at Bernie's II	Robert Klane	Andrew McCarthy, Jonathan Silverman, Terry Kiser	United States	
Who's the Man?	Ted Demme	Doctor Dré, Ed Lover, Badja Djola, Ice-T	United States	
The Wrong Trousers	Nick Park		United Kingdom	Stop motion

== 1994 ==
Comedy films of 1994
Title	Director	Cast	Production country	Genre
3 Ninjas Kick Back	Charles Kanganis	Sean Fox, Max Elliott Slade, Evan Bonifant	United States	Action comedy, family-oriented comedy
Ace Ventura: Pet Detective	Tom Shadyac	Jim Carrey, Courteney Cox, Sean Young	United States	
The Adventures of Priscilla, Queen of the Desert	Stephan Elliot	Terence Stamp, Hugo Weaving, Guy Pearce	Australia	
Airheads	Michael Lehmann	Brendan Fraser, Steve Buscemi, Adam Sandler	United States	
The Air Up There	Paul Michael Glaser	Kevin Bacon, Charles Gitonga Maina, Yolanda Vazquez	United States	
Amateur	Hal Hartley	Isabelle Huppert, Martin Donovan, Elina Lowensohn	United Kingdom; France; United States	Crime Comedy-Drama
Angels in the Outfield	William Dear	Danny Glover, Tony Danza, Brenda Fricker	United States	Heavenly comedy
Baby's Day Out	Patrick Read Johnson	Joe Mantegna, Lara Flynn Boyle, Joe Pantoliano	United States	
Barcelona	Whit Stillman	Tushka Bergen, Mira Sorvino, Pepe Munné	United States	Comedy-Drama
Beverly Hills Cop III	John Landis	Eddie Murphy, Judge Reinhold, Hector Elizondo	United States	Action Comedy
Blank Check	Rupert Wainwright	Brian Bonsall, Karen Duffy, Miguel Ferrer	United States	
Blankman	Mike Binder	Damon Wayans, David Alan Grier, Jon Polito	United States	
Bullets Over Broadway	Woody Allen	John Cusack, Jack Warden, Chazz Palminteri	United States	
Cabin Boy	Adam Resnick	Chris Elliott, Ritch Brinkley, James Gammon	United States	
Camp Nowhere	Jonathan Prince	Jonathan Jackson, Christopher Lloyd, Andrew Keegan	United States	
Car 54, Where Are You?	Bill Fishman	David Johansen, John C. McGinley, Fran Drescher	United States	
Cemetery Man	Michele Soavi	Rupert Everett, Francois Hadji-Lazaro, Anna Falchi	Italy; France; Germany	Horror comedy
La Cité de la peur	Alain Berbérian	Alain Chabat, Dominique Farrugia, Chantal Lauby	France	
City Slickers II: The Legend of Curly's Gold	Paul Weiland	Billy Crystal, Daniel Stern, Jon Lovitz	United States	
Clean Slate	Mick Jackson	Dana Carvey, Valeria Golino, James Earl Jones	United States	
Clerks	Kevin Smith	Brian O'Halloran, Jeff Anderson, Marilyn Ghigliotti	United States	
Clifford	Paul Flaherty	Martin Short, Charles Grodin, Mary Steenburgen	United States	
Cops & Robbersons	Michael Ritchie	Chevy Chase, Jack Palance, Dianne Wiest, Jason James Richter, Fay Masterson, Miko Hughes	United States	
Corrina, Corrina	Jessie Nelson	Whoopi Goldberg, Ray Liotta, Tina Majorino	United States	Comedy-Drama
The Cowboy Way	Gregg Champion	Woody Harrelson, Kiefer Sutherland, Dylan McDermott	United States	
Crooklyn	Spike Lee	Alfre Woodard, Delroy Lindo, David Patrick Kelly	United States	Comedy-Drama
D2: The Mighty Ducks	Sam Weisman	Emilio Estevez, Kathryn Erbe, Michael Tucker	United States	Comedy-Drama
Drunken Master II	Liu Chia-Liang	Jackie Chan, Anita Mui, Andy Lau	Hong Kong	Action Comedy
Dumb and Dumber	Peter Farrelly	Jim Carrey, Jeff Daniels, Lauren Holly	United States	
Eat Drink Man Woman	Ang Lee	Sihung Lung, Yu-wen Wang, Chien-lien Wu	Taiwan	Comedy-Drama
Ed Wood	Tim Burton	Johnny Depp, Martin Landau, Sarah Jessica Parker	United States	Comedy-Drama
Ernest Goes to School	Coke Sams	Jim Varney, Linda Kash, Bill Byrge	United States	
Exit to Eden	Garry Marshall	Dana Delany, Paul Mercurio, Rosie O'Donnell	United States	
Fear of a Black Hat	Rusty Cundieff	Rusty Cundieff, Larry B. Scott, Mark Christopher Lawrence	United States	
The Flintstones	Brian Levant	John Goodman, Elizabeth Perkins, Rick Moranis	United States	
Four Weddings and a Funeral	Mike Newell	Hugh Grant, Andie MacDowell, Kristin Scott Thomas	United Kingdom	Romantic Comedy
From Beijing with Love	Stephen Chow	Stephen Chow, Anita Yuen, Law Ka Ying	Hong Kong	
Getting Even with Dad	Howard Deutch	Macaulay Culkin, Ted Danson, Glenne Headly	United States	
Greedy	Jonathan Lynn	Michael J. Fox, Kirk Douglas, Nancy Travis	United States	
Guarding Tess	Hugh Wilson	Shirley MacLaine, Nicolas Cage, Austin Pendleton	United States	Comedy-Drama
House Party 3	Eric Meza	Christopher "Kid" Reid, Christopher "Play" Martin, Angela Means	United States	
The Hudsucker Proxy	Joel Coen	Tim Robbins, Jennifer Jason Leigh, Paul Newman	United States	
I'll Do Anything	James L. Brooks	Nick Nolte, Whittni Wright, Albert Brooks, Julie Kavner	United States	Comedy-Drama
I Love Trouble	Charles Shyer	Julia Roberts, Nick Nolte, Saul Rubinek	United States	Romantic Action comedy
In the Army Now	Daniel Petrie, Jr.	Pauly Shore, Andy Dick, Lori Petty	United States	
Un indien dans la ville	Hervé Palud	Ludwig Briand, Thierry Lhermitte, Patrick Timsit	France	
The Inkwell	Matty Rich	Larenz Tate, Suzzanne Douglas, Joe Morton	United States	Comedy-Drama
I.Q.	Fred Schepisi	Tim Robbins, Meg Ryan, Walter Matthau	United States	Romantic Comedy
It Could Happen to You	Andrew Bergman	Nicolas Cage, Bridget Fonda, Rosie Perez	United States	Romantic Comedy-Drama
It's Pat	Adam Bernstein	Julia Sweeney, Dave Foley, Charles Rocket	United States	
Jimmy Hollywood	Barry Levinson	Joe Pesci, Christian Slater, Victoria Abril	United States	
Junior	Ivan Reitman	Arnold Schwarzenegger, Danny DeVito, Emma Thompson	United States	
Lightning Jack	Simon Wincer	Paul Hogan, Cuba Gooding Jr., Beverly D'Angelo	United States	Western Comedy
Little Big League	Andrew Scheinman	Timothy Busfield, John Ashton, Ashley Crow	United States	
Little Giants	Duwayne Dunham	Rick Moranis, Ed O'Neill, John Madden	United States	
The Little Rascals	Penelope Spheeris	Travis Tedford, Bug Hall, Brittany Ashton Holmes	United States	
A Low Down Dirty Shame	Keenen Ivory Wayans	Keenen Ivory Wayans, Charles S. Dutton, Jada Pinkett Smith	United States	Action Comedy
The Madness of King George	Nicholas Hytner	Nigel Hawthorne, Helen Mirren, Ian Holm	United Kingdom; United States	Comedy of manners
Major League II	David S. Ward	Charlie Sheen, Tom Berenger, Corbin Bernsen	United States	
The Mask	Chuck Russell	Jim Carrey, Cameron Diaz, Peter Riegert	United States	
Maverick	Richard Donner	Mel Gibson, Jodie Foster, James Garner	United States	Western Comedy
Mixed Nuts	Nora Ephron	Steve Martin, Madeline Kahn, Robert Klein	United States	
Muriel's Wedding	P. J. Hogan	Toni Collette, Bill Hunter, Rachel Griffiths	Australia	Comedy-Drama
My Summer Story	Bob Clark	Charles Grodin, Mary Steenburgen, Kieran Culkin	United States	
Naked Gun 33 1/3: The Final Insult	Peter Segal	Leslie Nielsen, Priscilla Presley, George Kennedy	United States	
National Lampoon's Last Resort	Rafal Zielinski	Corey Haim, Corey Feldman, Geoffrey Lewis	United States	
Neuf mois	Patrick Braoudé	Patrick Braoudé, Philippine Leroy-Beaulieu, Catherine Jacob	France	Romantic Comedy
North	Rob Reiner	Elijah Wood, Bruce Willis, Jon Lovitz, Julia Louis-Dreyfus, Jason Alexander	United States	Comedy-Drama
Oblivion	Sam Irwin	Richard Joseph Paul, Jackie Swanson, Andrew Divoff	United States	
Only You	Norman Jewison	Marisa Tomei, Robert Downey Jr., Bonnie Hunt	United States	Romantic Comedy
PCU	Hart Bochner, Martin Walters	Jeremy Piven, Chris Young, Jon Favreau, David Spade	United States	
Le péril jeune	Cédric Klapisch	Romain Duris, Nicolas Koretz, Vincent Elbaz	France	Comedy-Drama
Police Academy: Mission to Moscow	Alan Metter	George Gaynes, Michael Winslow, David Graf	United States	
Princess Caraboo	Michael Austin	Jim Broadbent, Phoebe Cates, Wendy Hughes	United Kingdom; United States	
Pulp Fiction	Quentin Tarantino	John Travolta, Samuel L. Jackson, Uma Thurman	United States	Crime comedy
Radioland Murders	Mel Smith	Brian Benben, Mary Stuart Masterson, Ned Beatty	United States	
Prêt-à-Porter	Robert Altman	Kim Basinger, Anouk Aimée, Marcello Mastroianni	United States	Comedy-Drama
The Ref	Ted Demme	Denis Leary, Judy Davis, Kevin Spacey	United States	
Renaissance Man	Penny Marshall	Danny DeVito, Gregory Hines, Kadeem Hardison	United States	
Revenge of the Nerds IV: Nerds in Love	Steven Zacharias	Robert Carradine, Curtis Armstrong, Julia Montgomery	United States	
Richie Rich	Donald Petrie	Macaulay Culkin, John Larroquette, Edward Herrmann	United States	
The Road to Welville	Alan Parker	Anthony Hopkins, Matthew Broderick, Bridget Fonda	United States	Comedy-Drama
The Santa Clause	Bill Elvin, John Pasquin	Tim Allen, Judge Reinhold, Wendy Crewson	United States	
The Scout	Michael Ritchie	Albert Brooks, Brendan Fraser, Dianne Wiest	United States	
Serial Mom	John Waters	Kathleen Turner, Sam Waterston, Ricki Lake	United States	Black Comedy
Seven Sundays	Jean-Charles Tacchella	Thierry Lhermitte, Maurizio Nichetti, Rod Steiger	France; Italy	
The Silence of the Hams	Ezio Greggio	Dom DeLuise, Ezio Greggio, Billy Zane	Italy	
Something Fishy	Tonie Marshall	Anémone, Roland Bertin, Grégoire Colin	France	
Spanking the Monkey	David O. Russell	Jeremy Davies, Alberta Watson, Benjamin Hendrickson	United States	Black Comedy
The Stoned Age	James Melkonian	Michael Kopelow, Bradford Tatum, China Kantner	United States	
The Sum of Us	Geoff Burton, Kevin Dowling	Jack Thompson, Russell Crowe, John Pulson	United States	Comedy-Drama
Swimming With Sharks	George Huang	Kevin Spacey, Frank Whaley, Michelle Forbes	United States	
Take Care of Your Scarf, Tatiana	Aki Kaurismäki	Kati Outinen, Matti Pellonpää, Kirsi Tykkyläinen	Finland; Germany	
Threesome	Andrew Fleming	Lara Flynn Boyle, Stephen Baldwin, Josh Charles	United States	Comedy-Drama
Three Colors: White	Krzysztof Kieslowski	Zbigniew Zamachowski, Julie Delpy, Janusz Gajos	France; Poland; Switzerland	Comedy-Drama
Trapped in Paradise	George Gallo	Nicolas Cage, Jon Lovitz, Dana Carvey	United States	
True Lies	James Cameron	Arnold Schwarzenegger, Jamie Lee Curtis, Tom Arnold	United States	Action comedy
Wagons East	Peter Markle	John Candy, Richard Lewis, John C. McGinley	United States	Western Comedy

== 1995 ==
Comedy films of 1995
Title	Director	Cast	Production country	Genre
3 Ninjas Knuckle Up	Simon Sheen	Michael Treanor, Max Elliott Slade, Chad Power	United States	Action Comedy
Ace Ventura: When Nature Calls	Steve Oedekerk	Jim Carrey, Ian McNeice, Simon Callow	United States	
The American President	Rob Reiner	Michael Douglas, Annette Bening, Martin Sheen, Michael J. Fox	United States	Comedy-Drama
Antonia's Line	Marleen Gorris	Willeke van Ammelrooy, Els Dottermans, Jan Decleir	Netherlands	
Bad Boys	Michael Bay	Martin Lawrence, Will Smith, Téa Leoni	United States	Action Comedy
Billy Madison	Tamra Davis	Adam Sandler, Darren McGavin, Bradley Whitford	United States	
Blue in the Face	Paul Auster, Wayne Wang	Harvey Keitel, Lou Reed, Michael J. Fox	United States	
Blue Juice	Carl Prechezer	Sean Pertwee, Catherine Zeta-Jones, Steven Mackintosh	United States	Comedy-Drama
The Brady Bunch Movie	Betty Thomas	Shelley Long, Gary Cole, Michael McKean	United States	
A Bucket of Blood	Michael McDonald	Anthony Michael Hall, Justine Bateman, Shadoe Stevens	United States	Horror Comedy
Bushwhacked	Greg Beeman	Daniel Stern, Jon Polito, Brad Sullivan	United States	
Bye Bye Love	Sam Weisman	Matthew Modine, Randy Quaid, Paul Reiser Janeane Garofalo	United States	
Canadian Bacon	Michael Moore	Alan Alda, John Candy, Rhea Perlman	United States	
Casper	Brad Silberling	Malachi Pearson, Christina Ricci, Bill Pullman, Joe Nipote, Brad Garrett, Joe Alaskey	United States	Fantasy Comedy
A Close Shave	Nick Park		United Kingdom	Stop motion
Clueless	Amy Heckerling	Alicia Silverstone, Paul Rudd, Stacey Dash, Brittany Murphy	United States	
The Day of the Beast	Álex de la Iglesia	Armando De Razza, Gianni Ippoliti, Alex Angulo	Spain	Black comedy, horror comedy
Demon Knight	Gilbert Adler, Ernest R. Dickerson	Billy Zane, Jada Pinkett Smith, Brenda Bakke	United States	Horror Comedy
Dracula: Dead and Loving It	Mel Brooks	Leslie Nielsen, Peter MacNicol, Steven Weber	United States	Horror Comedy
Dream a Little Dream 2	James Lemmo	Corey Feldman, Corey Haim, Stacie Randall	United States	
Empire Records	Allan Moyle	Anthony LaPaglia, Rory Cochrane, Johnny Whitworth	United States	Comedy-Drama
Father of the Bride Part II	Charles Shyer	Steve Martin, Diane Keaton, Martin Short	United States	
Flirt	Hal Hartley	Bill Sage, Martin Donovan, Parker Posey	United States; Germany; Japan	Comedy-Drama
Forget Paris	Billy Crystal	Billy Crystal, Debra Winger, Joe Mantegna	United States	Romance Comedy
Four Rooms	Allison Anders, Alexandre Rockwell, Robert Rodriguez, Quentin Tarantino	Tim Roth, Valeria Golino, Jennifer Beals	United States	
Freaky Friday	Melanie Mayron	Shelley Long, Gaby Hoffmann, Catlin Adams	United States	
French Kiss	Lawrence Kasdan	Meg Ryan, Kevin Kline, Timothy Hutton	United States	Romantic Comedy
Friday	F. Gary Gray	Ice Cube, Chris Tucker, Nia Long	United States	
Get Shorty	Barry Sonnenfeld	John Travolta, Gene Hackman, Rene Russo	United States	
Getting Any?	Takeshi Kitano	Takeshi Kitano, Dankan, Sonomanma Higashi	Japan	
God's Comedy	João César Monteiro	Raquel Ascensao, Manuela de Freitas, João César Monteiro	Portugal	
A Goofy Movie	Kevin Lima	Bill Farmer, Jason Marsden, Kellie Martin, Jim Cummings, Rob Paulsen	United States	Animated Film
Grumpier Old Men	Howard Deutch	Jack Lemmon, Walter Matthau, Ann-Margret	United States	
Heavyweights	Steven Brill, David B. Householter	Tom McGowan, Aaron Schwartz, Ben Stiller	United States	
Home for the Holidays	Jodie Foster	Holly Hunter, Robert Downey Jr., Anne Bancroft	United States	Comedy-Drama
Houseguest	Randall Miller	Sinbad, Phil Hartman, Jeffrey Jones	United States	
It Takes Two	Andy Tennant	Mary-Kate Olsen, Ashley Olsen, Kirstie Alley, Steve Guttenberg	United States	
Jeffrey	Christopher Ashley	Steven Weber, Patrick Stewart, Michael T. Weiss	United States	
The Jerky Boys: The Movie	James Melkonian, J. Miller Tobin	Johnny Brennan, Kamal Ahmed, Alan Arkin	United States	
Jumanji	Joe Johnston	Robin Williams, Kirsten Dunst, Bradley Pierce, David Alan Grier, Bonnie Hunt	United States	Fantasy Comedy
Jury Duty	John Fortenberry	Pauly Shore, Tia Carrere, Stanley Tucci	United States	
Kicking and Screaming	Noah Baumbach	Josh Hamilton, Olivia D'Abo, Carlos Jacott	United States	Comedy-Drama
A Kid in King Arthur's Court	Michael Gottlieb	Thomas Ian Nicholas, Joss Ackland, Art Malik	United States	
The Last Supper	Stacy Title	Cameron Diaz, Ron Eldard, Annabeth Gish	United States	
Life 101	Redge Mahaffey	Corey Haim, Ami Dolenz, Keith Coogan	United States	Comedy-Drama
Living in Oblivion	Tom DiCillo	Steve Buscemi, Catherine Keener, Dermot Mulroney	United States	
Major Payne	Nick Castle	Damon Wayans, Karyn Parsons, Orlando Brown	United States	
Mallrats	Kevin Smith	Shannen Doherty, Jeremy London, Jason Lee	United States	
Man of the House	James Orr	Chevy Chase, Farrah Fawcett, Jonathan Taylor Thomas	United States	
Mighty Aphrodite	Woody Allen	Woody Allen, Helena Bonham Carter, Mira Sorvino	United States	
Money Train	Joseph Ruben	Wesley Snipes, Woody Harrelson, Jennifer Lopez	United States	Action Comedy
Nine Months	Chris Columbus	Hugh Grant, Julianne Moore, Tom Arnold	United States	
Not This Part of the World	Phil Atlakson	Adam West, Matt Letscher, Randy Davison	United States	
Now and Then	Lesli Linka Glatter	Gaby Hoffmann, Christina Ricci, Ashleigh Aston Moore, Thora Birch	United States	Comedy-Drama
Operation Dumbo Drop	Simon Wincer	Danny Glover, Ray Liotta, Denis Leary	United States	
Party Girl	Daisy von Scherler Mayer	Parker Posey, Omar Townsend, Sasha von Scherler	United States	Comedy-Drama
Problem Child 3: Junior in Love	Greg Beeman	William Katt, Sherman Howard, Eric Edwards	United States	
Les Rendez-vous de Paris	Eric Rohmer	Clara Bellar, Serge Renko, Antoine Basler	France	
Rumble in the Bronx	Stanley Tong	Jackie Chan, Anita Mui, Bill Tung	Hong Kong	Action comedy
Sabrina	Sydney Pollack	Harrison Ford, Julia Ormond, Greg Kinnear	United States	Romantic Comedy-Drama
Slam Dunk Ernest	John Cherry	Jim Varney, Cylk Cozart, Kareem-Abdul Jabbar	United States	
Something to Talk About	Lasse Hallstrom	Julia Roberts, Dennis Quaid, Robert Duvall, Kyra Sedgwick	United States	Comedy-Drama
Summer Snow	Ann Hui	Allen Fong, Manfred Wong, Roy Chiao	Hong Kong	Comedy-Drama
Tank Girl	Rachel Talalay	Lori Petty, Naomi Watts, Malcolm McDowell	United States	Action comedy
Things to Do in Denver When You're Dead	Gary Fleder	Andy Garcia, Christopher Lloyd, William Forsythe	United States	Crime Comedy
To Die For	Gus Van Sant	Nicole Kidman, Matt Dillon, Joaquin Phoenix	United States	
To Wong Foo Thanks for Everything, Julie Newmar	Beeban Kidron	Wesley Snipes, Patrick Swayze, John Leguizamo	United States	
Tokyo Fist	Shinya Tsukamoto	Shinya Tsukamoto, Naomasa Musaka, Naoto Takenaka	Japan	Black comedy
Tommy Boy	Peter Segal	Chris Farley, David Spade, Rob Lowe, Bo Derek	United States	
Toy Story	John Lasseter	Tom Hanks, Tim Allen	United States	Animated Fantasy comedy
Underground	Emir Kusturica	Lazar Ristovski, Slavko Stimac, Bora Todorovic	France; Germany; Hungary	Comedy-Drama
Up, Down, Fragile	Jacques Rivette	Marianne Denicourt, Nathalie Richard, Laurence Côte	France	
Vampire in Brooklyn	Wes Craven	Eddie Murphy, Angela Bassett, Allen Payne, Kadeem Hardison	United States	Horror Comedy
Welcome to the Dollhouse	Todd Solondz	Heather Matarazzo, Daria Kalinina, Matthew Faber	United States	
While You Were Sleeping	Jon Turteltaub	Sandra Bullock, Bill Pullman, Peter Gallagher	United States	Romantic Comedy

== 1996 ==
Comedy films of 1996
Title	Director	Cast	Production country	Genre
101 Dalmatians	Stephen Herek	Glenn Close, Jeff Daniels, Joely Richardson	United States	Family-oriented comedy
A Very Brady Sequel	Arlene Sanford	Shelley Long, Gary Cole, Tim Matheson	United States	
The Associate	Donald Petrie	Whoopi Goldberg, Dianne Wiest, Eli Wallach	United States	
Beautiful Girls	Ted Demme	Timothy Hutton, Matt Dillon, Noah Emmerich	United States	Comedy-Drama
Beavis and Butt-Head Do America	Mike Judge	Mike Judge, Bruce Willis, Demi Moore, Cloris Leachman, Robert Stack	United States	Animated film
Bernie	Albert Dupontel	Albert Dupontel, Claude Perron, Roland Blanche	France	
Big Bully	Steve Miner	Rick Moranis, Tom Arnold, Carol Kane	United States	
Bio-Dome	Jason Bloom	Pauly Shore, Stephen Baldwin, William Atherton	United States	
The Birdcage	Mike Nichols	Robin Williams, Nathan Lane, Gene Hackman, Dianne Wiest, Calista Flockhart	United States	
Black Sheep	Penelope Spheeris	Chris Farley, David Spade, Tim Matheson	United States	
Bottle Rocket	Wes Anderson	Owen Wilson, Luke Wilson, Robert Musgrave	United States	
Bulletproof	Ernest Dickerson	Damon Wayans, Adam Sandler, Kristen Wilson	United States	Action Comedy
The Cable Guy	Ben Stiller	Jim Carrey, Matthew Broderick, Leslie Mann	United States	
Camping Cosmos	Jan Bucquoy	Jean-Henri Compère, Fanny Hanciaux, Lolo Ferrari	Belgium	
Cannibal! The Musical	Trey Parker	Trey Parker, Dian Bachar, Ian Hardin	United States	
Carpool	Arthur Hiller	Tom Arnold, David Paymer, Rhea Perlman	United States	
Celtic Pride	Tom DeCerchio	Damon Wayans, Daniel Stern, Dan Aykroyd	United States	
The Christmas Party	Jari Halonen	Jorma Tommila, Antti Reini, Oiva Lohtander	Finland	Crime comedy
Citizen Ruth	Alexander Payne	Laura Dern, Swoosie Kurtz, Kurtwood Smith	United States	
Conspirators of Pleasure	Jan Svankmajer	Petr Meissel	Czech Republic; Switzerland; United Kingdom	Black comedy, sex comedy
Curdled	Reb Braddock	William Baldwin, Angela Jones, Bruce Ramsay	United States	
D3: The Mighty Ducks	Robert Lieberman	Emilio Estevez, Jeffrey Nordling, Kenan Thompson	United States	Comedy-Drama
Dear God	Garry Marshall	Greg Kinnear, Laurie Metcalf, Tim Conway	United States	
Don't Be a Menace to South Central While Drinking Your Juice in the Hood	Paris Barclay	Shawn Wayans, Marlon Wayans, Tracey Cherelle Jones	United States	
Down Periscope	David S. Ward	Kelsey Grammer, Lauren Holly, Rob Schneider	United States	
Dunston Checks In	Ken Kwapis	Eric Lloyd, Jason Alexander, Faye Dunaway	United States	
Ed	Bill Couturié	Matt LeBlanc, Jayne Brook, Bill Cobbs	United States	
Eddie	Steve Rash	Whoopi Goldberg, Frank Langella, Dennis Farina	United States	
Emma	Douglas McGrath	Gwyneth Paltrow, Toni Collette, Ewan McGregor	United States	
Faithful	Paul Mazursky	Cher, Chazz Palminteri, Ryan O'Neal	United States	Comedy-Drama
Family Resemblances	Benoit Delhomme, Cédric Klapisch	Jean-Pierre Bacri, Jean-Pierre Darroussin, Catherine Frot	France	
Fargo	Joel Coen	Frances McDormand, William H. Macy, Steve Buscemi	United States	Black Comedy
Feeling Minnesota	Steven Baigelman	Keanu Reeves, Cameron Diaz, Vincent D'Onofrio, Dan Aykroyd, Delroy Lindo	United States	Romantic Crime Comedy
First Kid	David Mickey Evans	Sinbad, Brock Pierce, James Naughton	United States	
First Strike	Stanley Tong	Jackie Chan, Wu Chen-chun, Jackson Lou	Hong Kong	Action Comedy
The First Wives Club	Hugh Wilson	Bette Midler, Goldie Hawn, Diane Keaton	United States	
Flirting with Disaster	David O. Russell	Ben Stiller, Patricia Arquette, Téa Leoni, Alan Alda, Mary Tyler Moore	United States	
Freeway	Matthew Bright	Reese Witherspoon, Kiefer Sutherland, Wolfgang Bodison, Brooke Shields	United States	Black Comedy
The Frighteners	Peter Jackson	Michael J. Fox, Trini Alvarado, Peter Dobson	United States	Horror Comedy
From Dusk till Dawn	Robert Rodriguez	George Clooney, Harvey Keitel, Quentin Tarantino	United States	Action Horror Comedy
Getting Away with Murder	Harvey Miller	Dan Aykroyd, Lily Tomlin, Jack Lemmon	United States	
The Great White Hype	Reginald Hudlin	Samuel L. Jackson, Jeff Goldblum, Damon Wayans, Jamie Foxx	United States	
Happy Gilmore	Dennis Dugan	Adam Sandler, Christopher McDonald, Julie Bowen, Carl Weathers	United States	
Harriet the Spy	Bronwen Hughes	Michelle Trachtenberg, Gregory Smith, Rosie O'Donnell	United States	
Head Above Water	Jim Wilson	Harvey Keitel, Cameron Diaz, Billy Zane	United States	Black Comedy
High School High	Hart Bochner	Jon Lovitz, Tia Carrere, Louise Fletcher	United States	
House Arrest	Harry Winer	Jamie Lee Curtis, Kevin Pollak, Jennifer Tilly	United States	
I'm Not Rappaport	Herb Gardner	Walter Matthau, Ossie Davis, Amy Irving	United States	Comedy-Drama
Jack	Francis Ford Coppola	Robin Williams, Diane Lane, Brian Kerwin, Jennifer Lopez	United States	Comedy-Drama
Jerry Maguire	Cameron Crowe	Tom Cruise, Cuba Gooding, Jr., Renée Zellweger	United States	Comedy-Drama
Jingle All the Way	Brian Levant	Arnold Schwarzenegger, Jake Lloyd, Rita Wilson, Sinbad, Phil Hartman	United States	
Joe's Apartment	John Payson	Jerry O'Connell, Megan Ward, Jim Turner	United States	
Kazaam	Paul Michael	Shaquille O'Neal, Francis Capra, Ally Walker	United States	Fantasy Comedy
Kingpin	Bobby Farrelly, Peter Farrelly	Woody Harrelson, Randy Quaid, Vanessa Angel	United States	
Larger than Life	Howard Franklin	Bill Murray, Janeane Garofalo, Matthew McConaughey	United States	
Mad Dog Time	Larry Bishop	Jeff Goldblum, Ellen Barkin, Gabriel Byrne, Richard Dreyfuss	United States	
Mars Attacks!	Tim Burton	Jack Nicholson, Glenn Close, Annette Bening	United States	Science Fiction Comedy
Matilda	Danny Devito	Mara Wilson, Danny DeVito, Rhea Perlman	United States	Fantasy Comedy
Michael	Nora Ephron	John Travolta, Andie MacDowell, William Hurt	United States	Fantasy Comedy
The Mirror Has Two Faces	Barbra Streisand	Barbra Streisand, Jeff Bridges, Lauren Bacall	United States	Romantic Comedy-Drama
Mother	Albert Brooks	Albert Brooks, Debbie Reynolds, Laura Weeks, Rob Morrow	United States	
Mr. Wrong	Nick Castle	Ellen DeGeneres, Bill Pullman, Joan Cusack	United States	
Mrs. Winterbourne	Richard Benjamin	Shirley MacLaine, Ricki Lake, Brendan Fraser	United States	Romantic Comedy-Drama
Multiplicity	Harold Ramis	Michael Keaton, Andie MacDowell, Harris Yulin	United States	
Muppet Treasure Island	Brian Henson	Steve Whitmire, Frank Oz, Dave Goelz, Jerry Nelson, Kevin Clash, Bill Barretta, John Henson, Tim Curry, Jennifer Saunders, Kevin Bishop	United States	Musical Comedy
My Fellow Americans	Peter Segal	Jack Lemmon, James Garner, Dan Aykroyd	United States	
Mystery Science Theater 3000: The Movie	Jim Mallon	Michael J. Nelson, Trace Beaulieu	United States	Science Fiction Comedy
The Nutty Professor	Tom Shadyac	Eddie Murphy, Jada Pinkett Smith, Larry Miller, John Ales, James Coburn	United States	
The Pallbearer	Matt Reeves	David Schwimmer, Gwyneth Paltrow, Michael Rapaport	United States	Romantic Comedy
Palookavlle	Roger Spottiswoode	William Forsythe, Vincent Gallo, Adam Trese, Frances McDormand	United States	
Phat Beach	Doug Ellin	Jermaine Hopkins, Brian Hooks, Coolio	United States	
The Preacher's Wife	Penny Marshall	Denzel Washington, Whitney Houston, Courtney B. Vance, Gregory Hines	United States	Comedy-Drama
Puddle Cruiser	Jay Chandrasekhar	Jay Chandrasekhar, Kevin Heffernan, Steve Lemme	United States	
Scream	Wes Craven	Liev Schreiber, Neve Campbell, Courteney Cox	United States	Horror Comedy
Shall We Dance?	Masayuki Suo	Kōji Yakusho, Tamiyo Kusakari, Naoto Takenaka	Japan	Romantic Comedy-Drama
Sgt. Bilko	Jonathan Lynn	Steve Martin, Dan Aykroyd, Phil Hartman, Glenne Headley	United States	
Space Jam	Joe Pytka	Michael Jordan, Billy West, Dee Bradley Baker, Kath Soucie, Danny DeVito, Bob Bergen, Bill Farmer, Maurice LaMarche, June Foray, Paul Julian, Wayne Knight, Bill Murray, Charles Barkley	United States	
Spy Hard	Rick Friedberg	Leslie Nielsen, Nicollette Sheridan, Charles Durning	United States	
Striptease	Andrew Bergman	Demi Moore, Burt Reynolds, Ving Rhames	United States	
The Stupids	John Landis	Tom Arnold, Jessica Lundy, Alex McKenna, Bug Hall	United States	
SubUrbia	Rick Friedberg	Giovanni Ribisi, Steve Zahn, Amie Carey	United States	Comedy-Drama
Sunset Park	Steve Gomer	Rhea Perlman, Fredro Starr, Terrence Howard, Carol Kane	United States	Comedy-Drama
Swingers	Doug Liman	Jon Favreau, Vince Vaughn, Ron Livingston	United States	
That Thing You Do!	Tom Hanks	Tom Everett Scott, Liv Tyler, Charlize Theron	United States	Comedy-drama
The Truth About Cats & Dogs	Michael Lehmann	Uma Thurman, Janeane Garofalo, Ben Chaplin, Jamie Foxx	United States	Romantic Comedy
Theodore Rex	Jonathan Betuel	Whoopi Goldberg, Armin Mueller-Stahl, Juliet Landau	United States	Sci-fi Comedy
A Thin Line Between Love and Hate	Martin Lawrence	Martin Lawrence, Lynn Whitfield, Regina King	United States	Romantic Comedy Thriller
Tin Cup	Ron Shelton	Kevin Costner, Rene Russo, Cheech Marin	United States	Romantic Comedy
Trainspotting	Danny Boyle	Ewan McGregor, Ewen Bremner, Jonny Lee Miller	United Kingdom	Comedy-Drama
Trees Lounge	Steve Buscemi	Steve Buscemi, Chloë Sevigny, Mark Boone Junior	United States	Comedy-Drama
Two Much	Fernando Trueba	Antonio Banderas, Melanie Griffith, Daryl Hannah	United States	Romantic Comedy
Waiting for Guffman	Christopher Guest	Christopher Guest, Eugene Levy, Fred Willard	United States	

== 1997 ==
- The 6th Man
- 8 Heads in a Duffel Bag
- A Smile Like Yours
- Addicted to Love
- Air Bud
- An American Werewolf in Paris
- As Good as It Gets
- Austin Powers: International Man of Mystery
- B*A*P*S
- Bean
- The Beautician and the Beast
- Beverly Hills Ninja
- The Borrowers
- Booty Call
- Breast Men
- Buddy
- Chasing Amy
- Critical Care
- Deconstructing Harry
- Ernest Goes to Africa
- Excess Baggage
- Fakin' da Funk
- Fathers' Day
- Fierce Creatures
- Flubber
- Fools Rush In
- For Richer or Poorer
- The Full Monty
- George of the Jungle
- Gone Fishin'
- Good Burger
- Grosse Pointe Blank
- Hercules
- Home Alone 3
- Honey, We Shrunk Ourselves
- How to Be a Player
- In & Out
- Jackie Brown
- Jungle 2 Jungle
- Leave It to Beaver
- Liar Liar
- A Life Less Ordinary
- The Man Who Knew Too Little
- The MatchMaker
- McHale's Navy
- Meet Wally Sparks
- Men in Black
- Money Talks
- MouseHunt
- Mr. Magoo
- Mr. Nice Guy
- My Best Friend's Wedding
- Nothing to Lose
- Orgazmo
- Out to Sea
- The Pest
- Picture Perfect
- Plump Fiction
- Private Parts
- The Real Blonde
- RocketMan
- Romy and Michele's High School Reunion
- A Simple Wish
- Six Ways To Sunday
- Snowboard Academy
- Soul Food
- Spice World
- Sprung
- That Old Feeling
- 'Til There Was You
- Toothless
- Trial and Error
- Trojan War
- Two Girls and a Guy
- Under Wraps
- Vegas Vacation
- Wag the Dog
- The Wrong Guy

== 1998 ==
- Air Bud: Golden Receiver
- Almost Heroes
- Antz
- Barney's Great Adventure
- BASEketball
- The Big Hit
- The Big Lebowski
- Billy's Hollywood Screen Kiss
- Blues Brothers 2000
- Bongwater
- A Bug's Life
- Bulworth
- Can't Hardly Wait
- Celebrity
- Chairman of the Board
- Cousin Bette
- Dead Man on Campus
- Dirty Work
- Dr. Dolittle
- Ernest in the Army
- Ever After
- Fear and Loathing in Las Vegas
- Free Enterprise
- Free Money
- The Godson
- Hairshirt
- The Hairy Bird
- Half Baked
- High Freakquency
- Holy Man
- Home Fries
- Hope Floats
- How to Make the Cruelest Month
- How Stella Got Her Groove Back
- I Got the Hook-Up
- I'll Be Home for Christmas
- The Impostors
- Jack Frost
- Kissing a Fool
- Krippendorf's Tribe
- Lethal Weapon 4
- Life is Beautiful
- Mafia!
- Major League: Back to the Minors
- Meet the Deedles
- My Giant
- National Lampoon's Golf Punks
- A Night at the Roxbury
- The Object of my Affection
- The Odd Couple II
- The Opposite of Sex
- Out of Sight
- Overnight Delivery
- The Parent Trap
- Patch Adams
- Paulie
- Pecker
- Playing by Heart
- Pleasantville
- Practical Magic
- Primary Colors
- Ride
- Rush Hour
- Rushmore
- The Rugrats Movie
- Safe Men
- Senseless
- Shakespeare in Love
- Simon Birch
- Six Days Seven Nights
- Sliding Doors
- Slums of Beverly Hills
- Small Soldiers
- Taxi
- There's Something About Mary
- The Truman Show
- Very Bad Things
- Waking Ned
- The Waterboy
- The Wedding Singer
- Who Am I?
- The Wonderful Ice Cream Suit
- Woo
- Wrongfully Accused
- You've Got Mail

== 1999 ==
- 10 Things I Hate About You
- 200 Cigarettes
- The Adventures of Elmo in Grouchland
- The All New Adventures of Laurel & Hardy in For Love or Mummy
- American Pie
- An Ideal Husband
- Analyze This
- Anywhere but Here
- Austin Powers: The Spy Who Shagged Me
- Baby Geniuses
- The Bachelor
- Being John Malkovich
- The Best Man
- Bicentennial Man
- Big Daddy
- The Big Kahuna
- Blast from the Past
- Blue Streak
- Bowfinger
- Breakfast of Champions
- But I'm a Cheerleader
- Can of Worms
- Chutney Popcorn
- Cookie's Fortune
- Coming Soon
- Crazy in Alabama
- Detroit Rock City
- Deuce Bigalow: Male Gigolo
- Diamonds
- Dick
- Dogma
- Doug's 1st Movie
- Drive Me Crazy
- Drop Dead Gorgeous
- Dudley Do-Right
- Edtv
- Election
- Flawless
- Foolish
- Forces of Nature
- Galaxy Quest
- Go
- Happy, Texas
- Idle Hands
- Inspector Gadget
- Jakob the Liar
- Jawbreaker
- K-911
- Life
- Lost & Found
- Love and Action in Chicago
- The Love Letter
- Love Stinks
- Man of the Century
- Man on the Moon
- Mickey Blue Eyes
- Mumford
- Muppets from Space
- The Muse
- My Favorite Martian
- Mystery, Alaska
- Mystery Men
- Never Been Kissed
- Notting Hill
- Office Space
- The Other Sister
- The Out-of-Towners
- Outside Providence
- Pros & Cons
- Pushing Tin
- Runaway Bride
- A Saintly Switch
- Screw Loose
- The Sex Monster
- She's All That
- Simon Sez
- SLC Punk
- Smart House
- South Park: Bigger, Longer & Uncut
- Splendor
- The Story of Us
- Stuart Little
- Superstar
- Teaching Mrs. Tingle
- Three Kings
- Three to Tango
- Toy Story 2
- Treehouse Hostage
- Varsity Blues
- Wild Wild West
- The Wood

== British ==
- Bean (1997)
- Beautiful People (1999)
- Brassed Off (1996)
- Bring Me the Head of Mavis Davis (1997)
- The Commitments (1991)
- East is East (1999)
- The Englishman Who Went Up a Hill But Came Down a Mountain (1995)
- Four Weddings and a Funeral (1994)
- The Full Monty (1997)
- Funny Bones (1995)
- Gregory's Two Girls (1999)
- Guest House Paradiso (1999)
- Hear My Song (1991)
- Hour of the Pig (1993)
- An Ideal Husband (1999)
- Jack and Sarah (1995)
- Keep the Aspidistra Flying (1997)
- Leon the Pig Farmer (1992)
- A Life Less Ordinary (1997)
- Little Voice (1998)
- Lock, Stock and Two Smoking Barrels (1998)
- Mad Cows (1999)
- The Madness of King George (1995)
- Much Ado About Nothing (1993)
- Notting Hill (1999)
- Peter's Friends (1992)
- Plunkett and MacLeane (1999)
- Princess Caraboo (1994)
- Rebecca's Daughters (1992)
- Shakespeare in Love (1998)
- Shooting Fish (1997)
- Sliding Doors (1998)
- Still Crazy (1998)
- Truly, Madly, Deeply (1991)
- Waking Ned (1998)
- The Wrong Trousers (1993)

== Comedy-horror ==
1990

- Tales from the Darkside: The Movie
- Tremors

1991

- Bride of Killer Nerd
- Cabinet of Dr. Ramirez
- Killer Nerd
- Nudist Colony of the Dead
- The People Under the Stairs

1992

- Army of Darkness
- Buffy the Vampire Slayer
- Braindead (aka Dead Alive)
- Death Becomes Her
- Dr. Giggles

1993

- Leprechaun
- Love Bites
- My Boyfriend's Back
- Return of the Living Dead 3

1994

- Cemetery Man
- Funny Man

1995

- Blood and Donuts
- The Day of the Beast
- Dracula: Dead and Loving It
- Ice Cream Man
- Tremors 2: Aftershocks
- Vampire in Brooklyn

1996

- Camping Cosmos
- Cannibal! The Musical
- The Frighteners
- Frostbiter: Wrath of the Wendigo
- From Dusk till Dawn

1997

- Dance with the Devil
- Evil Ed
- Jack Frost
- Killer Condom
- Uncle Sam

1998

- Bride of Chucky
- Legion of Fire: Killer Ants!

1999

- Idle Hands

== Hong Kong ==
- The Tricky Master (1999)

== Japanese ==
- Maroko (1990)

== Filipino ==
- John en Marsha 91 (1991)

== Parody ==
- Austin Powers: International Man of Mystery (1997)
- Austin Powers: The Spy Who Shagged Me (1999)
- Don't Be a Menace to South Central While Drinking Your Juice in the Hood (1996)
- Dracula: Dead and Loving It (1995)
- Fatal Instinct (1993)
- Galaxy Quest (1999)
- Hot Shots! (1991)
- Hot Shots! Part Deux (1993)
- Jane Austen's Mafia! (1998)
- Loaded Weapon 1 (1993)
- Mars Attacks! (1996)
- Plump Fiction (1997)
- Robin Hood: Men in Tights (1993)
- Spy Hard (1996)
- Wizards of the Demon Sword (1991)
- Wrongfully Accused (1998)

== Comedy-Drama ==
- Air Bud (1997)
- American Beauty (1999)
- Boogie Nights (1997)
- Forrest Gump (1994)
- Friday (1995)
- Fried Green Tomatoes (1991)
- Homeward Bound (1993)
- I Hired a Contract Killer (1993)
- A Man of No Importance (1994)
- Matilda (1996)
- Mrs. Doubtfire (1993)
- Muriel's Wedding (1994)
- Reality Bites (1994)
- The Sandlot (1993)
- The Truman Show (1998)
- White Men Can't Jump (1992)
