= Patterson Belknap Webb & Tyler =

Law firm in New York City

Patterson Belknap Webb & Tyler LLP, founded in 1919, is a law firm headquartered in New York City.

== Notable alumni ==
- Former attorney general of the United States and federal judge Michael B. Mukasey was a partner at the firm before his accession to the bench in 1988, and served many years as a judge, returning to the firm before being appointed attorney general.
- Former president of Georgia Mikheil Saakashvili was formerly an intern with the firm.
- Another former law partner is the former Manhattan District Attorney Robert Morgenthau.
- Robert P. Patterson, Jr. and Paul G. Gardephe, formerly and currently a federal judge on the United States District Court for the Southern District of New York, were formerly partners.
- Former New York City mayor Rudy Giuliani (1977 - 1981)
- Richard Parsons, former chairman of Citigroup and Time Warner
- Allison Rutledge-Parisi, chief administrative officer for Kaplan, Inc. and former actress, who appeared in Whit Stillman's Metropolitan (1990).
- Togo D. West, Jr., former United States Secretary of Veterans Affairs
- Analisa Nadine Torres, United States district judge of the United States District Court for the Southern District of New York.

== Notable partners ==
- Maurene Comey, former assistant United States attorney in the Southern District of New York
- Edward F. Cox, son-in-law of President Richard Nixon
- Guy Otto Farmer, former chair of the National Labor Relations Board
- Peter C. Harvey, former attorney general of New Jersey
