= Taylor Nichols =

American actor

- Born: Cecil Taylor Nichols; March 3, 1959 (age 67); East Lansing, Michigan, U.S.
- Occupation: Actor
- Years active: 1990–present
- Spouse: Margarita de Eguilior (m. 1995)
- Children: 2

Cecil Taylor Nichols (born March 3, 1959) is an American actor, known for his roles in several films by Whit Stillman including major roles in Metropolitan (1990) and Barcelona (1994), as well as his roles in the regular casts of the television series Modern Family (2010) and PEN15 (2019–2021).

== Career ==
Nichols is perhaps best known for his roles in the Whit Stillman films Metropolitan, Barcelona, The Last Days of Disco, and Damsels in Distress. His characters in the first three of these films were insecure, stuttering sidekicks to those of the more outgoing Chris Eigeman. Nichols and Eigeman also played minor roles in the independent film The Next Step, released in 1997, of which Nichols was an associate producer.

Nichols has also appeared in the films Boiler Room, Congo, The American President, The Big Easy, and Jurassic Park III, as well as episodes of the TV series Murder, She Wrote, NewsRadio, Chicago Hope, ER, Man of the People, Judging Amy, The Mind of the Married Man, CSI: Crime Scene Investigation, 24, Criminal Minds, The Mentalist, Bones, and Double Rush. In 2007 Nichols appeared in the film The Air I Breathe. He can also be seen in the 2018 film Chappaquiddick.

From 2019 to 2021, Nichols was a member of the regular cast in all three seasons of PEN15 on Hulu.

== Personal life ==
Nichols was born in East Lansing, Michigan and is a graduate of the University of Michigan. He has been married since 1995 to Margarita de Eguilior, a Spanish woman he met during the production of Barcelona. They have two daughters, Alexandra, who was born January 21, 1999, and Lee, born January 30, 2002.

Nichols is an avid bicyclist and advocate. He co-hosts a podcast, Bike Talk, which describes itself as "[a] radio show dedicated to the idea that we need to prioritize transportation by bikes."

== Filmography ==
- Metropolitan (1990) as Charlie Black
- Man of the People (1991–1992) as Richard Lawrence
- Barcelona (1994) as Ted Boynton
- Dirty Money (1995) as Herb
- Headless Body in Topless Bar (1995) as Danny
- Congo (1995) as Jeffrey Weems
- Serpent's Lair (1995) as Paul Douglas
- The American President (1995) as Stu
- Best Wishes Mason Chadwick (1995) as Mason Chadwick
- Murder, She Wrote (1993–1996) as Various
- The Larry Sanders Show (1997) as Robbie
- Wings (1997) as Russell Greaney
- NewsRadio (1997) as Glenn
- The Next Step (1997) as Peter
- Cadillac (1997) as Todd
- Born Bad (1997) as Agent Rickman
- ER as Mr. Adams
- The Last Days of Disco (1998) as Charlie / Ted Boynton
- Mixed Blessings (1998) as Rob
- Gideon (1998) as Dr. Richard Willows
- The Sex Monster (1999) as Billy
- Serious Business (1999) as Bradford
- Judging Amy (1999–2000) as Dr. Tracy Carroll
- Running Mates (2000) as Dave
- Boiler Room (2000) as Harry Reynard
- Mercury in Retrograde (2000) as Alex
- Jurassic Park III (2001) as Mark
- CSI: Crime Scene Investigation (2004, TV Series) as Kevin Greer a.k.a. "The Blue Painted Killer"
- Grey's Anatomy (2005) as Rick Humphrey
- Age of Kali (2005) as Tom Watson
- The Air I Breathe (2007) as Sorrow's Father
- Criminal Minds (2007) as William Reid
- Friday Night Lights (2007–2008) as Kevin
- Case 219 (2010) as Richard Ewing
- Black Mail (2010) as Lee Burrows
- Damsels in Distress (2011) as Professor Black
- Hide Away (2011) as The Boss
- Freeloaders (2012) as Kyle
- Godzilla (2014) as Military Analyst
- Bipolar (2014) as Donald Poole
- Bestseller (2015) as Agent Hayes
- 40 Nights (2016) as Joseph
- Chappaquiddick (2017) as Ted Sorensen
- 1BR (2019) as Jerry
- PEN15 (2019–2021) as Curtis Cone
- The Walking Dead (2020) as Jeremiah
- Perry Mason (2020) as Elder Seidel
- Roar (2022) as Stan
- Babylon (2022) as Wealthy Man
