= Christopher Tellefsen =

American film editor (born 1957)

- Born: April 11, 1957 (age 69)
- Occupation: Film editor
- Years active: 1986–present

Christopher Tellefsen (born April 11, 1957) is an American film editor.

In 2012, he was nominated for an Academy Award for his work on the film Moneyball.

== Select filmography ==
Editor
Year	Film	Director	Notes
1990	Metropolitan	Whit Stillman	First collaboration with Whit Stillman
1990	Revolution!	Jeff Kahn	
1991	Jumpin' at the Boneyard	Jeff Stanzler	
1993	Darkness in Tallinn	Ilkka Järvi-Laturi	
1994	Barcelona	Whit Stillman	
1995	Kids	Larry Clark	
1995	Smoke	Wayne Wang	First collaboration with Wayne Wang
1995	Blue in the Face	Wayne Wang	
1996	Flirting with Disaster	David O. Russell	First collaboration with David O. Russell
1996	The People vs. Larry Flynt	Miloš Forman	First collaboration with Miloš Forman
1997	Gummo	Harmony Korine	
1997	Chinese Box	Wayne Wang	
1998	Legionnaire	Peter MacDonald	
1999	Analyze This	Harold Ramis	
1999	Man on the Moon	Miloš Forman	
2001	Birthday Girl	Jez Butterworth	
2002	Changing Lanes	Roger Michell	
2003	The Human Stain	Robert Benton	
2004	The Village	M. Night Shyamalan	
2005	Capote	Bennett Miller	First collaboration with Bennett Miller
2006	A Guide to Recognizing Your Saints	Dito Montiel	
2007	Perfect Stranger	James Foley	
2008	The Yellow Handkerchief	Udayan Prasad	
2009	The Rebound	Bart Freundlich	
2010	Fair Game	Doug Liman	
2011	Moneyball	Bennett Miller	
2014	The Drop	Michaël R. Roskam	
2015	True Story	Rupert Goold	
2015	Joy	David O. Russell	
2016	Assassin's Creed	Justin Kurzel	
2018	A Quiet Place	John Krasinski	
2019	Light of My Life	Casey Affleck	
2019	The Kitchen	Andrea Berloff	
2021	The Many Saints of Newark	Alan Taylor	
2022	The Menu	Mark Mylod	
2023	Nyad	Elizabeth Chai Vasarhelyi; Jimmy Chin	
2026	The Whisper Man	James Ashcroft	

Editorial department
Year	Film	Director	Role	Ref.
1986	The Color of Money	Martin Scorsese	Assistant editor	
1987	My Demon Lover	Charlie Loventhal	Assistant editor	
1995	Smoke	Wayne Wang	Additional editor	
2018	Widows	Steve McQueen	Additional editor	

Music department
Year	Film	Director	Role
1990	Metropolitan	Whit Stillman	Music editor

Sound department
Year	Film	Director	Role
1989	Cookie	Susan Seidelman	Assistant sound editor

Thanks
Year	Film	Director	Role
2016	Blood Father	Jean-François Richet	Special thanks

Documentaries

Editor
Year	Film	Director
2014	Lambert & Stamp	James D. Cooper

TV series

Editor
Year	Title	Notes
1995	American Cinema	1 episode
