= Best New Director =

Former award given by New York Film Critics Circle from 1989 till 1996

New York Film Critics Circle Award for Best New Director
- Description: Film award honoring an outstanding debut or emerging director
- Country: United States
- Presented by: New York Film Critics Circle

Best New Director was an award given by the New York Film Critics Circle from its first inception in 1989 until discontinuing in 1996. There was no award in 1993.

== 1980s ==
=== 1989 ===
- Kenneth Branagh – Henry V
  - Runners-up: Steve Kloves – The Fabulous Baker Boys and Jim Sheridan – My Left Foot

== 1990s ==
=== 1990 ===
- Whit Stillman – Metropolitan
  - Runners-up: John McNaughton – Henry: Portrait of a Serial Killer and Kevin Costner – Dances with Wolves

=== 1991 ===
- John Singleton – Boyz n the Hood
  - Runner-up: Anthony Minghella – Truly, Madly, Deeply

=== 1992 ===
- Allison Anders – Gas Food Lodging
  - Runners-up: Quentin Tarantino – Reservoir Dogs and Tim Robbins – Bob Roberts

=== 1994 ===
- Darnell Martin – I Like It Like That
  - Runners-up: Kevin Smith – Clerks and David O. Russell – Spanking the Monkey

=== 1995 ===
- Chris Noonan - Babe
  - Runners-up: Lodge Kerrigan – Clean, Shaven and Noah Baumbach – Kicking and Screaming

== See also ==
- John Cassavetes Award
- MTV Movie Award for Best New Filmmaker
