= Lambert & Stamp =

- Theatrical release poster
- Directed by: James D. Cooper
- Produced by: James D. Cooper; Douglas Graves; Loretta Harms
- Cinematography: James D. Cooper
- Edited by: Christopher Tellefsen
- Music by: The Who
- Production companies: Harms/Cooper, Motorcinema, Inc. Production
- Distributed by: Sony Pictures Classics
- Release dates: January 20, 2014 (Sundance Film Festival); April 3, 2015 (USA)
- Running time: 120 minutes
- Country: United States
- Languages: English; French; German

Lambert & Stamp is a 2014 American documentary film, produced and directed by James D. Cooper. The film had its world premiere at 2014 Sundance Film Festival on January 20, 2014. After its premiere at Sundance Film Festival, Sony Pictures Classics acquired the distribution rights of the film. The film later screened at 2014 Sundance London Film Festival on April 18, 2014. The film had its theatrical release in United States on April 3, 2015.

== Synopsis ==
The film narrates how aspiring filmmakers Chris Stamp and Kit Lambert, searching a subject for their underground movie, wound up discovering, mentoring and co-managing the English rock band the Who. The film includes never before seen footage of the band from Stamp's personal archive, including film from the 1966 Windsor festival, which was not known to exist.

== Reception ==
Lambert & Stamp received positive reviews from critics. Rob Nelson of Variety, said in his review that "James D. Cooper's impeccably directed debut is a definitive screen bio of the Who and its-rock operatic rise." David Rooney in his review for The Hollywood Reporter praised the film by saying that "A wonderfully alive behind-the-music chronicle that rescues two genuine mavericks from the footnotes of rock history."
