= 1990 New York Film Critics Circle Awards =

56th New York Film Critics Circle Awards

56th NYFCC Awards

January 13, 1991

Best Film:
Goodfellas

The 56th New York Film Critics Circle Awards honored the best filmmaking of 1990. The winners were announced on 18 December 1990 and the awards were given on 13 January 1991.

== Winners ==
- Best Actor:
  - Robert De Niro - Goodfellas and Awakenings
  - Runners-up: Jeremy Irons - Reversal of Fortune and Danny Glover - To Sleep with Anger
- Best Actress:
  - Joanne Woodward - Mr. & Mrs. Bridge
  - Runners-up: Anjelica Huston - The Grifters and Kathy Bates - Misery
- Best Cinematography:
  - Vittorio Storaro - The Sheltering Sky
  - Runner-up: Michael Ballhaus - Goodfellas
- Best Director:
  - Martin Scorsese - Goodfellas
  - Runner-up: Bernardo Bertolucci - The Sheltering Sky
- Best Film:
  - Goodfellas
  - Runners-up: Mr. & Mrs. Bridge, The Grifters and Reversal of Fortune
- Best Foreign Film:
  - The Nasty Girl (Das schreckliche Mädchen) • West Germany
  - Runners-up: Cyrano de Bergerac • France and Cinema Paradiso (Nuovo cinema Paradiso) • Italy
- Best New Director:
  - Whit Stillman - Metropolitan
  - Runners-up: John McNaughton - Henry: Portrait of a Serial Killer and Kevin Costner - Dances with Wolves
- Best Screenplay:
  - Ruth Prawer Jhabvala - Mr. & Mrs. Bridge
  - Runners-up: Whit Stillman - Metropolitan and Charles Burnett - To Sleep with Anger
- Best Supporting Actor:
  - Bruce Davison - Longtime Companion
  - Runners-up: Joe Pesci - Goodfellas and John Turturro - Miller's Crossing
- Best Supporting Actress:
  - Jennifer Jason Leigh - Miami Blues and Last Exit to Brooklyn
  - Runners-up: Joan Plowright - Avalon and Lorraine Bracco - Goodfellas
- Special Awards:
  - Film Forum
  - Karen Cooper
  - Bruce Goldstein
