= Allison Rutledge-Parisi =

American actress

Allison Rutledge-Parisi, known during her acting career as Allison Parisi, is an attorney, and a former chief administrative officer for Kaplan, Inc., and a former actress. She is known for her role as Jane Clark in Whit Stillman's 1990 film Metropolitan.

== Career ==
Rutledge-Parisi graduated from Yale University.

Credited during her acting career as Allison Parisi, she made her acting debut in Greg Mottola’s short film Swingin' in the Painter's Room in 1989. A year later, she was cast as Jane Clark in Whit Stillman’s Metropolitan. In 1991, she appeared in an episode of NBC's Midnight Caller, with Gary Cole.

In the early 1990s, she gave up acting and enrolled at Columbia Law School in New York City, where she was named a Harlan Fiske Scholar.

After graduating from law school and passing the bar exam, Rutledge-Parisi clerked for Judge Robert W. Sweet in the United States District Court for the Southern District of New York. After working as an intellectual property lawyer for the firm of Patterson Belknap Webb & Tyler in Manhattan, she joined Kaplan, Inc. in 2004. In 2007, she was promoted to Kaplan's chief administrative officer.

In 2017, the Metropolitan Museum of Art announced her hiring as its Vice President, Chief Human Resources Officer.

In March 2021 she joined Justworks as senior vice president of people.

== Personal life ==
Rutledge-Parisi is married to Dr. James Marion. They have two daughters and live in the Manhattan neighborhood of Harlem.
