= The Last Days of Disco =

1998 film by Whit Stillman

- Theatrical release poster
- Directed by: Whit Stillman
- Written by: Whit Stillman
- Produced by: Whit Stillman
- Starring: Chloë Sevigny; Kate Beckinsale; Chris Eigeman; Matt Keeslar; Mackenzie Astin; Matthew Ross; Tara Subkoff; Burr Steers; David Thornton; Jaid Barrymore; Michael Weatherly; Robert Sean Leonard; Jennifer Beals
- Cinematography: John Thomas
- Edited by: Andrew Hafitz; Jay Pires
- Music by: Mark Suozzo
- Production companies: Castle Rock Entertainment; PolyGram Filmed Entertainment (uncredited); Westerly Films
- Distributed by: Gramercy Pictures (United States, Canada, Australia and New Zealand); Warner Bros. (International)
- Release date: June 12, 1998
- Running time: 113 minutes
- Country: United States
- Language: English
- Budget: $8 million
- Box office: $3 million

The Last Days of Disco is a 1998 American comedy-drama film written and directed by Whit Stillman, and loosely based on his travels and experiences in various nightclubs in Manhattan, including Studio 54. Starring Chloë Sevigny and Kate Beckinsale, the film follows a group of Ivy League and Hampshire College graduates falling in and out of love in the disco scene of New York City in the early 1980s.

The Last Days of Disco is the third film (following Metropolitan and Barcelona) in what Stillman calls his "Doomed-Bourgeois-in-Love series". The three films are independent of each other except for cameo appearances of some common characters. According to Stillman, the idea for Disco was originally conceived after the shooting of Barcelona's disco scenes. In 2000, Stillman published a novelization of the film.

The film was released theatrically in the United States on June 12, 1998; its DVD and video releases followed in 1999. The DVD releases eventually went out of print, and the film was widely unavailable for home video purchase until it was picked up by The Criterion Collection and released in a director-approved special edition on August 25, 2009. Along with Metropolitan and Barcelona, a print of The Last Days of Disco resides in the permanent film library of the Museum of Modern Art.

== Plot ==
In September 1980, Alice Kinnon and Charlotte Pingress, recent Hampshire College graduates, work as poorly paid readers for a New York City publisher. After work one night, they enter an exclusive disco nightclub where Alice hopes to socialize with Jimmy Steinway, who uses the club to entertain his advertising clients. Barred from bringing clients, Jimmy is eventually kicked out by his friend Des McGrath, a manager at the club whose job is in jeopardy for allowing in Jimmy and his clients. After Jimmy leaves, Alice takes Charlotte's advice to go home with her second choice, Tom Platt. At work the next morning, Alice and Charlotte ask other editors how to fast-track their careers. Unable to afford rent on their own, they move in together with a third girl, Holly. Despite Alice's reluctance, they settle on a railroad apartment.

Returning to the club, Alice is upset to learn Charlotte has designs on Jimmy and that Tom was separated from a long-term girlfriend when he slept with Alice but their one-night stand convinced him to return to her. Des begins to pursue Alice.

At work, Alice pursues the publication of a book on Buddhism, written by the Dalai Lama's brother, that Charlotte had previously recommended rejecting and gains the editors' respect. It is discovered that the author is not the Dalai Lama's brother, but Alice maintains the book is one of the best she has ever read. Charlotte, now dating Jimmy, is openly insecure about his and Alice's apparent friendliness.

Charlotte loudly announces to various friends at the club that Alice has gonorrhea, deducing it when Alice refuses to drink. She immediately apologizes but tells Alice it will make men view her as more accessible. Des does become more interested in being with Alice and they start dating casually.

Alice has dinner with Tom and confronts him about giving her gonorrhea, which he initially denies but Alice reveals he was her first sexual partner. He admits he also gave her herpes.

Josh Neff, a district attorney and friend of Jimmy's who frequently attends the club, asks Alice to lunch to pitch a book. He confesses he is actually interested in Alice and they go on a real date, where he tells her he is on medication for manic depression. Returning home, Alice discovers Charlotte being taken away in an ambulance and is told by Jimmy that he is moving to Barcelona. At the hospital, Charlotte asks Alice if Jimmy ever expressed interest in being with her. When Alice admits that he did, Charlotte reacts with tears and tells her she would like her to move out of their shared apartment.

Police raid the club for tax fraud and Des tries to run away despite Josh's promise to protect him, believing Josh's interest in Alice will cause him to act unfairly. They later discover that disco records are not selling anymore and attendance is already down.

Alice and Charlotte learn their employer has merged with a larger publishing house and layoffs are expected. Some time later, Charlotte, Josh and Des are seen leaving the unemployment office. Josh announces he is going to Lutèce for lunch, treated by Alice, who is celebrating her promotion and her book that was published after she switched it from nonfiction to self-help. Des and Charlotte discuss how their big personalities are too much for normal people like Alice, Josh and Jimmy. Des says that pairing off monogamously detracts from their glamorous lifestyle and Charlotte agrees.

Later, Josh and Alice dance to "Love Train" on the subway and are joined by the rest of the passengers.

== Cast ==
- Chloë Sevigny as Alice Kinnon: One of two main characters, a quiet, passive but intelligent young woman working as a book editor in Manhattan. She and Charlotte, frequent companions, work for the same publisher and attended a prestigious college together.
- Kate Beckinsale as Charlotte Pingress: The other main character, a rather narcissistic and shallow person. She constantly offers "advice" to Alice and criticizes her lack of sociability. She is outgoing but domineering.
- Chris Eigeman as Des McGrath: A manager at the disco Alice and Charlotte frequent, casually dating Alice at one point. He is intelligent but somewhat conniving, and hooks up with many women, with a routine of pretending to come out as homosexual when he has lost interest in them.
- Mackenzie Astin as Jimmy Steinway: An ambitious friend of Des who works in advertising. Jimmy has to sneak his way into the disco in costume because the house owner doesn't want "those kind of people" in the club. He dates Charlotte.
- Matt Keeslar as Josh Neff: An assistant district attorney who takes an interest in Alice. Upon his introduction to Alice at the disco, he is rudely interrupted by Charlotte, who pushes him away. Alice eventually begins a relationship with him, and comes to learn that he has bipolar disorder.
- Robert Sean Leonard as Tom Platt: A charming, wealthy environmental lawyer with whom Alice has a one-night stand. He gained interest in Alice after meeting her at the disco but proved to not be relationship material. In her sexual encounter with him, Alice contracts both gonorrhea and herpes.
- Jennifer Beals as Nina Moritz: One of Des's conquests, who falls for his "coming out" act and later discovers he was lying to rid himself of her.
- Matthew Ross as Dan Powers: A Harvard graduate and co-worker of Alice and Charlotte. He often criticizes them; they call him "Departmental Dan".
- Tara Subkoff as Holly: A quiet woman whose intelligence and relationship choices are questioned by Charlotte and Alice. She becomes their roommate when they decide to move in together.
- Burr Steers as Van: A worker at the disco and sort of henchman of Bernie's.
- David Thornton as Bernie Rafferty: The owner of the disco and Des's boss.
- Mark McKinney as Rex: The owner of Rex's bar.
- George Plimpton as Clubgoer.
- Anthony Haden-Guest as Clubgoer.
- Carolyn Farina as Audrey Rouget. She appears briefly as do her Metropolitan co-stars Bryan Leder (Fred Neff) and Dylan Hundley (Sally Fowler).
- Taylor Nichols as Charlie/Ted Boyton. This character appears with the first name "Charlie" in Metropolitan while also appearing in Barcelona (with the same last name) as "Ted".

== Production ==
=== Development and casting ===
The idea for the film reportedly came to Whit Stillman after filming the disco scenes in his previous film, Barcelona. Stillman, who had frequented the New York discos in the 1970s and 1980s, announced the project soon thereafter, and interest from a handful of film distributors and actors sprouted before the film had been written. According to Stillman in the 2009 audio commentary for the film, various actors (many of them reportedly "big names") were interested in the project from its original conception; Ben Affleck was originally looking into playing the role of Des, but Stillman, who had worked with Chris Eigeman before, gave him the role instead. Kate Beckinsale, who was living in England at the time, mailed an audition tape to Stillman; he was immediately mesmerized and cast her in the role of Charlotte. The leading role of Alice Kinnon took the longest to cast—it originally was going to go to an unnamed European actress, but according to Stillman, she resembled Beckinsale too much and also had a non-American accent that caused complications. Winona Ryder was subsequently offered the role through her agent. The call was placed by studio executives on a Monday. The film's editor, Chris Tellefsen, who had previously worked as the editor of Kids, recommended Chloë Sevigny after seeing her performance in that film. Two days after the phone call was placed to Ryder's agent, Sevigny, who had been given the script through her agent, auditioned for the role and won it. By the time Ryder's agent returned the call, Sevigny had already been cast.

=== Filming ===
Principal photography began on August 12 and ended on October 27, 1997. Filming took place in various New York City locations, and the structure used for the disco was Loew's Jersey Theatre in Jersey City, New Jersey, which was being renovated. The filmmakers had to share the location with another film production that took place there beforehand. The other production paid for the red carpeting used in the building, and the rest of the interior was designed and paid for by Stillman's crew.

The film's distributor had also pushed the filmmakers to complete the film and get it released before the Miramax disco club film 54, and it was; 54 was released in US cinemas in late August 1998, two months after the theatrical debut of The Last Days of Disco.

== Themes ==
Like Stillman's other films, The Last Days of Disco deals with social structure, sexual politics, and group dynamics. The relationships that bloom from the club are often expressed through long dialogue sequences, with Stillman's trademark dry humor and "sharp lines" often blurted, especially by Charlotte and Josh.

== Release ==
=== Box office ===
The Last Days of Disco was theatrically released on June 12, 1998, in US theaters, where it grossed $277,601 on its opening weekend. It went on to make $3 million in North America. With a production budget of $8 million, the film was considered a financial failure, although it was well received by many critics. It was received better than the critically panned 54, which dealt with the Manhattan disco Studio 54.

=== Critical reception ===
The Last Days of Disco received generally positive reviews from critics. Rotten Tomatoes gives it a score of 73% based on 62 reviews, with an average rating of 6.5/10. Metacritic gives it a 76 out of 100 rating, based on 24 critics, indicating "generally favorable reviews".

Film critic Roger Ebert gave the film 3.5 stars out of four and wrote: "If [F.] Scott Fitzgerald were to return to life, he would feel at home in a Whit Stillman movie. Stillman listens to how people talk, and knows what it reveals about them". In her review for The New York Times, Janet Maslin praised Eigeman's performance: "Mr. Eigeman makes the filmmaker a perfect mouthpiece who can brood amusingly about anything, no matter how petty. Here he plumbs the psychological subtext of Lady and the Tramp". In his review for The New York Observer, Andrew Sarris wrote: "Mr. Stillman's free ticket with the critics for the seemingly magical minimalism of Metropolitan has long since expired. In his future projects, all the charm and buoyancy in the world may not compensate for a lack of structure and bedrock reality".

Entertainment Weekly gave the film an A− grade; Lisa Schwarzbaum wrote that "Stillman's gang may be maturing precariously close to middle age, but it's lovely to know the important pleasures of conversation and intellectual discussion endure". In his review for the Los Angeles Times, Kenneth Turan praised the "exceptional acting ensemble" for being "successful at capturing the brittle rituals of this specific group of genteel, well-spoken young people on the cusp of adulthood who say things like 'What I was craving was a sentient individual' and 'It's far more complicated and nuanced than that'".

== Legacy ==
Stillman did not direct another film until Damsels in Distress (2012).

According to Sevigny in a 2009 audio commentary track for the film, her performance in The Last Days of Disco—particularly the upbeat dance sequence finale in the subway—got the attention of director Kimberly Peirce, who cast Sevigny in Boys Don't Cry (1999). Sevigny received an Oscar nomination for her performance in that film, but said that of all the films she's made, The Last Days of Disco is the one "people come up to me about" the most.

Sevigny also said that she became good friends on set with co-star Subkoff, with whom she remained close after shooting. The two worked together on a fashion line called Imitation of Christ in 2003, along with Scarlett Johansson.

The film was accessioned by the film library at the Museum of Modern Art in New York City, where it is sometimes screened to the public. It was last shown at the museum's Pop Rally event in August 2009, with Stillman, Eigeman, and Subkoff present for a question-and-answer session after the screening. An after-party in celebration of the screening was also advertised and held that evening.

=== Novelization ===
Stillman wrote a novelization of the film published by Farrar, Straus and Giroux under the same title, with the added subtitle "...With Cocktails at Petrossian Afterwards". It won the 2014 Prix Fitzgerald Award.

== Soundtrack ==
The Last Days of Disco

Soundtrack album by various artists
- Released: May 26, 1998
- Genre: Disco
- Label: Sony

1. I Love the Nightlife – 3:01 (Alicia Bridges)
2. I'm Coming Out – 5:25 (Diana Ross)
3. Got to Be Real – 3:45 (Cheryl Lynn)
4. Good Times – 3:45 (Chic)
5. He's the Greatest Dancer – 3:34 (Sister Sledge)
6. I Don't Know If It's Right – 3:48 (Evelyn "Champagne" King)
7. More, More, More, Pt. 1 – 3:02 (Andrea True Connection)
8. Doctor's Orders – 3:31 (Carol Douglas)
9. Everybody Dance – 3:31 (Chic)
10. The Love I Lost – 6:25 (Harold Melvin & the Blue Notes)
11. Let's All Chant – 3:05 (Michael Zager Band)
12. Got to Have Loving – 8:18 (Don Ray)
13. Shame – 6:34 (Evelyn "Champagne" King)
14. Knock on Wood – 3:52 (Amii Stewart)
15. The Oogum Boogum Song – 2:34 (Brenton Wood)
16. Love Train – 3:00 (O'Jays)
17. I Love the Nightlife (Disco 'Round) – 3:13 (La India & Nuyorican Soul)

== Home media ==
The film was released on VHS and DVD in 1999 through Image Entertainment. The DVD release included the film's original theatrical trailer as its sole bonus feature.

After being unavailable for home media purchase for some time, the film was rereleased in 2009 for the Criterion Collection DVD series in a restored version Stillman approved. It was the 485th film in the series. Stillman's first film, Metropolitan, was also released in the Criterion series. The Criterion release of The Last Days of Disco included audio commentary by Stillman, Sevigny, and Eigeman; four deleted scenes; a promotional making-of featurette; an audio recording of Stillman reading a passage from his novelization; a still gallery with a text narrative by Stillman; and the original theatrical trailer. A liner essay by novelist David Schickler was also included as a paper insert.

The Criterion DVD's cover features an illustration by French artist Pierre Le-Tan, depicting Beckinsale and Sevigny preparing themselves in the powder room before entering the disco; the painting is a replication of a scene in the film. Criterion released a Blu-ray on July 24, 2012.

== See also ==
- Disco music
- 200 Cigarettes - a 1999 film similar in content
