= Movie... In Your Face =

- Directed by: Joseph Butcher; David Merwin
- Written by: John Content; Mark Richardson; Tommy Sledge
- Starring: Tommy Sledge; Kent Cheng; Wong Ching; Paul Chun; Wong Jung; Lee Ho San; Dorothy Yu; Jimmy Wang Yu (credited as Yu Wang)
- Distributed by: North Coast Entertainment
- Release date: 1990
- Running time: 85 minutes
- Language: English

Movie... In Your Face is a 1990 comedy film, mostly consisting of a redubbed Hong Kong movie.

In the style of movies like What's Up, Tiger Lily?, this movie was "produced" by replacing the original sound track of a 1984 Hong Kong movie — Ma hou pao or Crazy Kung Fu Master — with an English language sound track written to make the movie into a feature-length farce. Stand-up comic Tommy Sledge narrates the movie in his usual "hard-boiled detective" persona.

== Plot ==
A group of Japanese gangsters overrun a movie studio to decide whether or not they want to buy it. Before they can buy it, however, they have to wait until after the studio's elderly owner dies.

== Availability ==
This movie has been released on VHS videocassette, but not on DVD.
