= Dylan Hundley =

American actress, singer and artist

- Born: Dylan Karol Hundley; Reno, Nevada, United States
- Origin: The Lenox School
- Genres: Post-punk; New wave
- Occupations: Actress, singer and visual artist

Dylan Karol Hundley is an American actress, singer and visual artist best known for playing Sally Fowler in the Academy Award-nominated film Metropolitan, as lead singer of the New York post-punk / new wave band Lulu Lewis, and for her solo project Darling Black. She also hosts Radar on The Vinyl District.

== Early life ==
Hundley was born in Reno, Nevada, to Sandra Lee Ison and Monty Hundley. She was brought up in The Bahamas, New Jersey and Manhattan. Hundley attended The Lenox School.

== Career ==
=== Film career ===
Hundley's first movie role was in Stillman's independent film Metropolitan (1990). Other film credits include Dangerous Game (1993), The Last Days of Disco (1998), Jacklight (1999), A Holiday Affair (2000) and Forever (2005).

Hundley continued performance studies during these years with Susan Peretz, Marcia Haufrecht and Sandra Lee, all of the Actors Studio. She produced the feature film Buzzkill (2012), starring Kristen Ritter, Daniel Raymont, and Darrell Hammond, released in association with the Chicago-based improvisational comedy enterprise The Second City, many of whose alumni appear in the film.

In 2015, Vanity Fair celebrated the 25th anniversary of Metropolitan with a full cast portrait in its August 2015 issue. Editor Graydon Carter is a well-known fan of the film.

=== Music career ===
In 2016 Hundley formed Lulu Lewis with her Argentinian-born multi-instrumentalist husband, Pablo Martin of the Tom Tom Club and The Du-Rites. They released their debut self-titled EP in the summer of 2017 to critical acclaim. This led to live dates supporting Richard Lloyd of Television, Gene Loves Jezebel, Shilpa Ray, The Waldos and The Fleshtones. Live band members include Jay Mumford (J-Zone), William Harvey, and Bruce Martin.

Lulu Lewis released its debut LP, Genuine Psychic, in July 2019 to critical acclaim. Its release show was held at Union Pool in Brooklyn, New York. It supported The Messthetics (former Fugazi members). Brendan Canty of both bands also guested on Lulu Lewis's debut LP.

Lulu Lewis then released dub versions of four tracks from the LP, For Entertainment Purposes Only. On February 14, 2020, it released The Love Song EP, an album of cover songs, including Roxy Music's "In Every Dream Home a Heartache", John Cale's "Helen of Troy", and Funkadelic's "I'll Bet You".

Lulu Lewis's sophomore LP, Dyscopia, was ranked the #1 album of the year by DJ Evan "Funk" Davies of the radio station WFMU. Davies also ranked Lulu Lewis's 2023 single "Destroy All Data" the #1 single of the year.

== Personal life ==
Hundley has one child, Harper Ace, born in 2007. She has been married to Pablo Martin since 2016. She lives in Dobbs Ferry, New York.
