= Barcelona (film) =

1994 film by Whit Stillman

- Theatrical release poster
- Directed by: Whit Stillman
- Written by: Whit Stillman
- Produced by: Whit Stillman
- Starring: Taylor Nichols; Chris Eigeman; Tushka Bergen; Mira Sorvino; Pep Munné; Hellena Schmied; Núria Badia; Jack Gilpin; Thomas Gibson
- Cinematography: John Thomas
- Edited by: Christopher Tellefsen
- Music by: Mark Suozzo
- Production company: Castle Rock Entertainment
- Distributed by: Fine Line Features
- Release date: July 29, 1994
- Running time: 101 minutes
- Country: United States
- Language: English
- Budget: $3.2 million
- Box office: $7.2 million

Barcelona is a 1994 American romantic comedy-drama film written, produced, and directed by Whit Stillman. Set in Barcelona, the film stars Taylor Nichols, Chris Eigeman, and Mira Sorvino.

Barcelona is the second film—after Metropolitan (1990) and preceding The Last Days of Disco (1998)—in what Stillman calls his "Doomed Bourgeois in Love" series. The three films are independent of each other except for the cameo appearances of some common characters. Barcelona was released by Fine Line Features on July 29, 1994. The film received positive reviews from critics and grossed $7.2 million against a $3.2 million budget.

== Plot ==
In 1987, Ted Boynton is a Chicago salesman living and working in Barcelona. Ted's cousin, Fred, a naval officer, unexpectedly comes to stay with Ted. Fred has been sent to Barcelona to handle public relations on behalf of a U.S. fleet scheduled to arrive later.

The cousins have a history of conflict since childhood. Ted and Fred develop relationships with various single women in Barcelona and experience the negative reactions of some of the community's residents to the context of Fred's presence. Ted also faces possible problems with his American employer and with the concept of attraction to physical beauty.

== Cast ==
- Taylor Nichols as Ted Boynton
- Chris Eigeman as Fred Boynton
- Tushka Bergen as Montserrat Raventos
- Mira Sorvino as Marta Ferrer
- Pep Munné as Ramon
- Hellena Schmied as Greta
- Núria Badia as Aurora Boval
- Jack Gilpin as the consul
- Thomas Gibson as Dickie Taylor

== Reception ==
On the review aggregator website Rotten Tomatoes, Barcelona holds an approval rating of 84% based on 37 reviews, with an average rating of 6.8/10. Metacritic, which uses a weighted average, assigned the film a score of 74 out of 100, based on seven critics, indicating "generally favorable" reviews.

Roger Ebert gave the film 3 out of 4 stars in the Chicago Sun-Times, comparing it to the works of Woody Allen and described the plot as being "as lighthearted as a Scott Fitzgerald short story, all about young people skimming the surface of the pond of life, flitting here and there, making small talk and flirting." Finding it to be deeper following a second viewing, Ebert concluded his review by writing that the film "give[s] voice to a generation. If there is one part of American society that American movies are usually not interested in, it is the wage-earning, 9-to-5, ambitious, competitive, white collar society of business and management. Watching this movie, I realized that although I’d seen a lot of amazing things on the screen before, I’d hardly ever seen young WASPs earning a living."

=== Year-end lists ===
- 5th – Bob Strauss, Los Angeles Daily News
- 7th – Yardena Arar, Los Angeles Daily News
- 8th – Todd Anthony, Miami New Times
- Top 9 (not ranked) – Dan Webster, The Spokesman-Review
- Top 10 (listed alphabetically, not ranked) – Steve Murray, The Atlanta Journal-Constitution
- Top 10 (not ranked) – Betsy Pickle, Knoxville News-Sentinel
- Best of the year (not ranked) - Jeffrey Lyons, Sneak Previews
- Best "sleepers" (not ranked) – Dennis King, Tulsa World
