= Metropolitan (1990 film) =

1990 film by Whit Stillman

- Theatrical release poster
- Directed by: Whit Stillman
- Written by: Whit Stillman
- Produced by: Whit Stillman
- Starring: Carolyn Farina; Edward Clements; Taylor Nichols; Christopher Eigeman; Allison Rutledge-Parisi; Dylan Hundley; Isabel Gillies; Bryan Leder; Will Kempe; Elisabeth Thompson
- Cinematography: John Thomas
- Edited by: Christopher Tellefsen
- Music by: Mark Suozzo; Tom Judson
- Production companies: Westerly Films; Allagash Films
- Distributed by: New Line Cinema
- Release dates: January 20, 1990 (Sundance); August 3, 1990 (United States)
- Running time: 98 minutes
- Country: United States
- Language: English
- Budget: $225,000
- Box office: $7 million

Metropolitan is a 1990 American romantic comedy-drama film produced, written and directed by Whit Stillman, in his feature directorial debut. The film concerns the lives of a group of wealthy young socialites during debutante season in Manhattan. In addition to some of their debutante parties, it covers their frequent informal after-hours gatherings at a friend's Upper East Side apartment, where they discuss life, philosophy and their fate; form attachments, romances and intrigues; and react to an interesting but less well-to-do newcomer.

Metropolitan was nominated for Best Original Screenplay at the 63rd Academy Awards. The film is often considered the first of a trilogy of Stillman films set in the 1980s and portraying privileged young adults, followed chronologically by The Last Days of Disco (1998) and Barcelona (1994).

== Plot ==
During Manhattan debutante season, middle-class Princeton student Tom Townsend attends a deb ball on a whim. A mix-up over a taxi home introduces him to a small group of young Upper East Side socialites known as the Sally Fowler Rat Pack, after the girl whose fancy apartment they use for afterparties. The Rat Pack invites him to the night's afterparty to prevent ill feelings.

At the afterparty, Tom befriends several Rat Pack members, including Nick, a cynic who takes Tom under his wing; Audrey, a shy girl who enjoys Regency-era literature and develops a crush on Tom; and Charlie, a philosophical friend with an unrequited crush on Audrey. Tom learns that he and the Rat Pack have some common friends, including his ex-girlfriend Serena, with whom he remains infatuated.

Under Nick's tutelage, Tom ingratiates himself with the Rat Pack. Although he initially sticks out due to his left-wing, Fourierist views, he fits into the social crowd and becomes a full-fledged member. Much of the film is composed of dialogues in which the Rat Pack discuss their nebulous social scene and uncertain futures. They worry that they are coming of age just as the culture in which they were raised is ending.

One reason Tom fits in is that his social cachet trumps his wealth. He attended the Pomfret boarding school at the same time that Serena went to Farmington with several Rat Pack girls. Nick explains that the Rat Pack needs Tom because there is a shortage of socially respectable young men to escort debutantes to formal events.

Although the Rat Pack welcomes him, Tom harbors a love–hate relationship with wealth and the upper class. His wealthy father abandoned the family to marry another woman, forcing Tom and his mother to move into a middle-class apartment on the Upper West Side. Tom slowly realizes that he is in denial about his distant relationship with his father.

Serena has been dating Rick Von Sloneker, a young, titled aristocrat notorious for his womanizing. Nick resents Rick and accuses him of getting a girl drunk and convincing her to "pull a train" several years ago, after which she committed suicide. When Rick confronts him, Nick admits that his story is a "composite" of incidents from Rick's life. He insists that it is based on real events, but the Rat Pack is scandalized.

As debutante season ends, the Rat Pack unravels. Nick leaves Manhattan. During a parlor game, Tom admits he loves Serena and not Audrey. In response, Audrey leaves to spend the rest of the vacation with Rick and their mutual friend Cynthia in the Hamptons. Charlie, who tells himself that society is out to get the elite, is surprised to hear that other young elites have achieved success in life. Tom learns that Sally is surreptitiously dating Allen, an older record producer; it is implied that Allen promised to make her a star.

Realizing that he has developed feelings for Audrey, Tom recruits Charlie to help him rescue her from Rick. The two travel to Southampton, bonding en route. They are surprised to find Audrey in no peril. Tom and Charlie instigate a fight with Rick, who asks them to leave. Audrey is delighted to see that Tom and Charlie have come for her, and leaves with them.

Tom and Audrey talk on the beach. Audrey says she is planning to attend college in France, and Tom contemplates visiting her there. Tom, Audrey, and Charlie begin hitchhiking to Manhattan together.

== Cast ==
- Carolyn Farina as Audrey Rouget
- Edward Clements as Tom Townsend
- Christopher Eigeman as Nick Smith
- Taylor Nichols as Charlie Black
- Allison Parisi as Jane Clark
- Dylan Hundley as Sally Fowler
- Isabel Gillies as Cynthia McLean
- Bryan Leder as Fred Neff
- Will Kempe as Rick Von Sloneker
- Ellia Thompson as Serena Slocum
- Stephen Uys as Victor Lemley
- Roger W. Kirby as man at bar

== Production ==
Whit Stillman wrote the screenplay for Metropolitan between 1984 and 1988 while running an illustration agency in New York, and financed it by selling his apartment for $50,000, and with contributions from family members and friends. Including post-production, the film cost $210,000 to make. Stillman wanted to set the film in the past, possibly in the pre-Woodstock 1960s, but the budget did not allow for a strict period film to be made. Instead, he added period details to give the film an "aura of the past", like vintage Checker Cabs, and a scene shot at the restaurant J.G. Melon, and excluded anything too specific to the present day. The film recalls a time when the Upper West Side had not yet gentrified and was "considered more intellectual and less patrician than the Upper East Side."

== Themes ==
Leading commentators such as Emanuel Levy have called the film a comedy of manners. In her book Jane Austen and Co., Suzanne R. Pucci compares the film to Austen's novels and those of Henry James, such as The Wings of the Dove. For Pucci, the film deserves full membership in the class of 20th- and early 21st-century Austen remakes such as Ruby in Paradise (1993) and Bridget Jones's Diary (2001). According to her, the film tracks "the Austen phenomenon beyond Austen, into what [is called] the 'post-heritage' film, a kind of historical costume drama that uses the past in a deliberate or explicit way to explore current issues in cultural politics".

In 2015, The New Yorker film critic Richard Brody wrote that Metropolitan is about the plight of America's upper class, or what the film's characters call the "urban haute bourgeoisie", and the "possibility—the necessity—and the difficulty of breaking out of their world and connecting with the wider world, for the benefit of the wider world". Muriel Zagha notes that the film's characters are haunted by a sense of "self-questioning and unease at the perspective of social decline and a descent into irrelevance." This "elegiac mood" is reflected by Charlie's overt worries about the future, as well as the books the characters read: for example, Tom reads Spengler's The Decline of the West and Audrey reads Auchincloss's The Rector of Justin, a novel about "the collapse of high-minded traditional WASP society values."

In 2009, National Review named Metropolitan the third-best conservative film, with Mark Henrie, editor of the book Doomed Bourgeois in Love: Essays on the Films of Whit Stillman, writing, "With mocking affection, gentle irony, and a blizzard of witty dialogue, Stillman manages the impossible: He brings us to see what is admirable and necessary in the customs and conventions of America's upper class."

== Reception ==
On Rotten Tomatoes, the film holds an approval rating of 94% based on 47 reviews. The site's critical consensus reads, "Metropolitan gently skewers the young socialite class with a smartly written dramedy whose unique, specific setting yields rich universal truths". Metacritic, which uses a weighted average, assigned the film a score of 77 out of 100, based on 5 critics, indicating "generally favorable" reviews.

The film grossed $2.9 million in the United States and Canada and $7 million worldwide.

== Accolades ==
Award	Category	Nominee(s)	Result	Ref.
Academy Awards	Best Screenplay – Written Directly for the Screen	Whit Stillman	Nominated	
Dallas-Fort Worth Film Critics Association Awards	Best Film		Nominated	
Dallas-Fort Worth Film Critics Association Awards	Best Screenplay	Whit Stillman	Nominated	
Deauville American Film Festival	Coup de Coeur LTC	Whit Stillman	Won (Note: Tied with Allan Moyle for Pump Up the Volume.)	
Deauville American Film Festival	Critics Award	Whit Stillman	Won (Note: Tied with Jon Amiel for Tune in Tomorrow.)	
Independent Spirit Awards	Best Female Lead	Carolyn Farina	Nominated	
Independent Spirit Awards	Best Screenplay	Whit Stillman	Nominated	
Independent Spirit Awards	Best First Feature	Whit Stillman	Won	
Locarno Film Festival	Golden Leopard	Whit Stillman	Nominated	
Locarno Film Festival	Silver Leopard	Whit Stillman	Won	
National Board of Review Awards	Top Ten Films		7th Place	
New York Film Critics Circle Awards	Best Screenplay	Whit Stillman	Runner-up	
New York Film Critics Circle Awards	Best New Director	Whit Stillman	Won	
Sundance Film Festival	Grand Jury Prize: Dramatic	Whit Stillman	Nominated	
