= Whit Stillman =

American writer-director (born 1952)

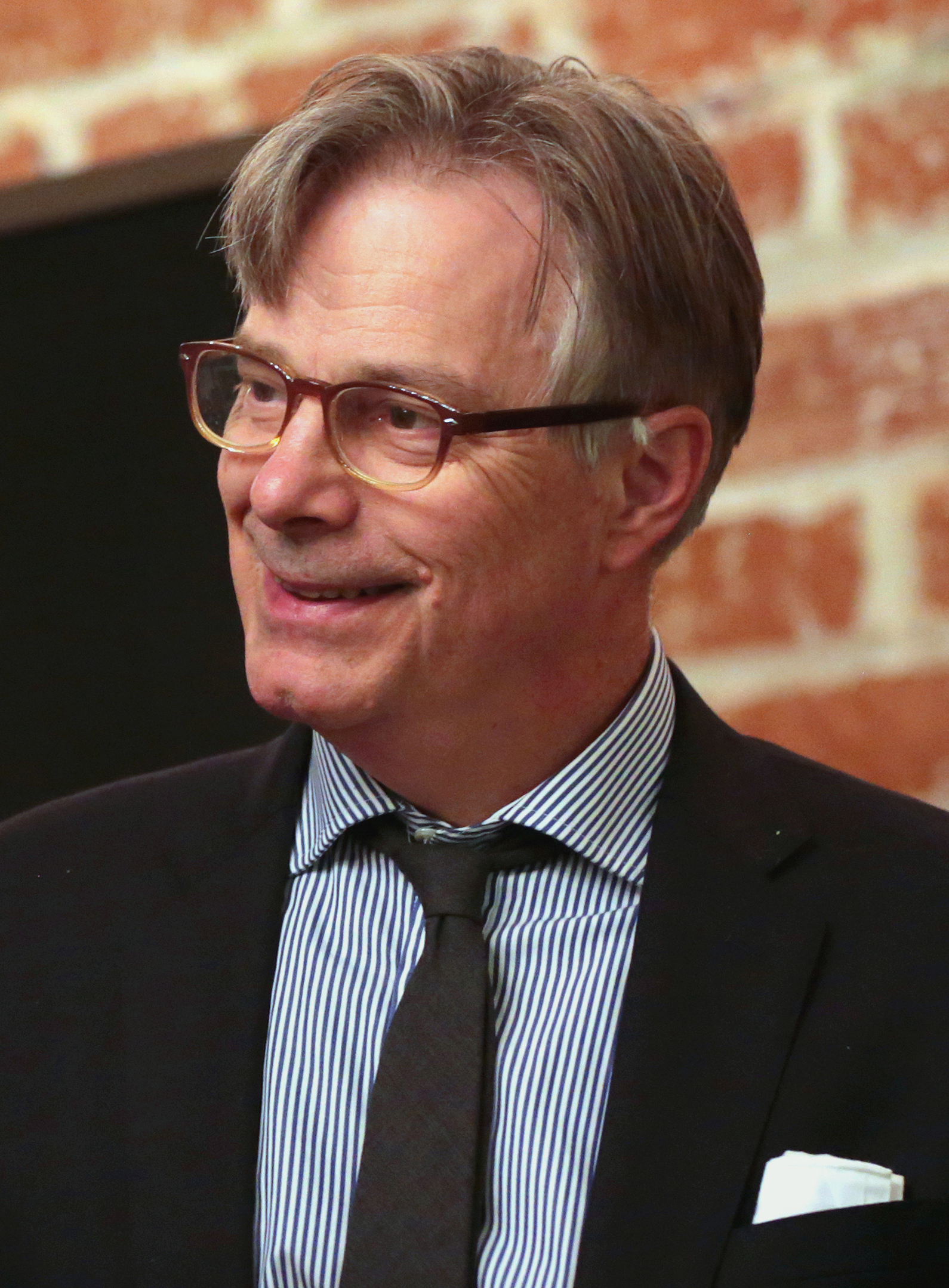
- Stillman in 2017
- Born: John Whitney Stillman; January 25, 1952 (age 74); Washington, D.C., U.S.
- Education: Millbrook School; Harvard University (AB)
- Occupations: Screenwriter, film director
- Years active: 1973–present
- Notable work: Metropolitan (1990); The Last Days of Disco (1998); Love & Friendship (2016)

John Whitney Stillman (born January 25, 1952) is an American writer-director known for his 1990 film Metropolitan, which earned him a nomination for the Academy Award for Best Original Screenplay. He is also known for his other films, Barcelona (1994), The Last Days of Disco (1998), Damsels in Distress (2011), and Love & Friendship (2016).

== Early life, family and education ==
Stillman was born in 1952 in Washington, D.C., into an old money family of WASPs, that traced their ancestry to the first Mayflower settlers. Stillman's mother Margaret Drinker Stillman (née Riley), comes from a wealthy Old Philadelphian family who lost their fortune during the Great Depression; his father was John Sterling Stillman, a Democratic politician from Washington, D.C., who served as the Assistant Secretary of Commerce for Legislative and Intergovernmental Affairs under President John F. Kennedy (a classmate of Stillman's father at Harvard). Stillman's paternal great-grandfather was businessman James Stillman; who was the son of Charles Stillman, an explorer from Wethersfield, Connecticut who founded Brownsville, Texas.

Stillman was raised in Cornwall, New York, and experienced depression during puberty. "I was very depressed when I was 11 or 12," he recounted to The Wall Street Journal. "I was sent to the leading Freudian child psychologist in Washington, D.C. It was heck. The last thing I needed to talk about was guilt about sex." However, when his parents separated, he found that his depression ceased. "I actually felt healthier."

Stillman's godfather was E. Digby Baltzell, a University of Pennsylvania professor and sociologist of the American upper class who popularized the term WASP.

He attended the Collegiate School in New York City, Potomac School in McLean, Virginia, and Millbrook School in Millbrook, New York. He majored in history at Harvard University, where he wrote for its student newspaper The Harvard Crimson.

== Career ==
=== 1973–1989: Early career ===
After graduating from Harvard in 1973, Stillman began working as an editorial assistant at Doubleday in New York City, followed by a stint as a junior editor at The American Spectator, a conservative magazine. Stillman has subsequently distanced himself from his work for the Spectator, stating that he now hates "to be drawn into ideological debates" and prefers to remain "apolitical."

He was introduced to some film producers from Madrid and persuaded them that he could sell their films to Spanish-language television in the US. He worked for the next few years in Madrid and Barcelona as a sales agent for directors Fernando Trueba and Fernando Colomo, and sometimes acted in their films, usually playing comic Americans, as in Trueba's film Sal Gorda.

=== 1990–1999: Breakthrough ===
Stillman wrote the screenplay for Metropolitan from 1984 to 1988 while running an illustration agency in New York, and he financed the film by selling the insider rights (Note: Insider rights are "special rights offered to tenants occupying apartments in a building in the process of converting to a co-op or condo, giving them the exclusive right to buy their apartments for a limited period of time and normally at a discounted price.") to his apartment (for $50,000) and with the contributions of friends and relatives. Loosely based on Stillman's Manhattan days, with his divorced mother during the week of Christmas break 1969 during his first year at Harvard, Metropolitan tells the story of the alienated Princetonian Tom Townsend's introduction to the "Sally Fowler Rat Pack" (SFRP), a small group of preppy, Upper East Side Manhattanites making the rounds at debutante balls during Christmas break of their first year in college. Though he is a socialist deeply skeptical of the SFRP's upper-class values, Tom (Edward Clements) grows increasingly attached to the cynical Nick (Chris Eigeman) and plays an important part, of which he is largely unaware, in the life of Audrey (Carolyn Farina), a young debutante. Many of the exclusive interior locations were lent to Stillman by family friends and relatives.

The film premiered and was screened as part of the Directors' Fortnight section at the 1990 Cannes Film Festival. Metropolitan was also nominated for the Grand Jury Prize (Drama) at the 1990 Sundance Film Festival. Stillman won Best First Feature at the 6th Independent Spirit Awards and was nominated for an Academy Award in 1991 for Best Original Screenplay. He won the 1990 New York Film Critics Circle Award for Best New Director. The movie was a financial success, grossing about $3 million on a budget of $225,000. In an interview Stillman said of the film, "The material seemed pretty rich, almost rank. And perhaps it's better approaching a subject people feel strongly about, even if that strong feeling is hatred, than something colorless and unspecific. Also, I love anachronism and this was the chance to film, essentially, a costume picture set in the present day or recent past. But a large part of the idea was to disguise our pitifully low budget by filming the most elegant subject available."

A few years later he directed Barcelona, his first studio-financed film, inspired by his own experiences in Spain during the early 1980s. Stillman has described the film as An Officer and a Gentleman, but with the title referring to two men rather than one. The men, Ted and Fred, experience the awkwardness of being in love in a foreign country culturally and politically opposed to their own. A few years later he would go on to direct The Last Days of Disco starring Kate Beckinsale and Chloë Sevigny. He also reunited with Chris Eigeman. The film was based loosely on Stillman's experiences in various Manhattan nightclubs, including Studio 54. The film concerns Ivy League and Hampshire graduates falling in and out of love in the disco scene of Manhattan in the "very early 1980s". Sevigny and Beckinsale play roommates with opposite personalities who frequent disco clubs together. The Last Days of Disco concludes a trilogy loosely based on Stillman's life and contains many references to the previous two films: a character considers a move to Spain to work for American ad agencies there after meeting with the Barcelona character of Ted Boynton, and Metropolitan's heroine Audrey Rouget reappears briefly as a successful publisher, as do a few other characters from that film as clubgoers. In 2000 Stillman published a novelization of the film, titled The Last Days of Disco, with Cocktails at Petrossian Afterwards. The novelization won the French 2014 Prix Fitzgerald Award.

=== 2000–2015 ===
Stillman stated in 2006 that he was working on several unfinished scripts. He had been slated to direct a film adaptation of Christopher Buckley's novel Little Green Men, but in a 2009 interview, Stillman said the adaptation is "[not] happening, at least with me." He was writing another film, Dancing Mood, set in Jamaica in the 1960s, which was not produced.

After a 13-year hiatus, Stillman released his fourth film, Damsels in Distress, starring Greta Gerwig, Adam Brody, Hugo Becker and Lio Tipton (credited as Analeigh Tipton). It premiered September 10 at the 2011 Venice Film Festival as the closing film and received favorable reviews. The film is "about three young women at an East Coast university, the transfer student that joins their group and the young men they become entangled with."

In 2014, Stillman wrote and directed the pilot episode of the TV series The Cosmopolitans for Amazon Studios. On August 28, 2014, the pilot was made available and Amazon Prime users could watch the pilot episode and vote to pick it up for a full series. On July 11, 2016, Tom Grater reported that Stillman was commissioned by Amazon to write six new scripts to continue his original pilot for The Cosmopolitans.

"I explained to Amazon that I don’t like outlining or projecting what something’s going to be. I like to allow a story to arise as I’m writing scripts. I find it horrible when I try to think of something for the plot without really being on the ground and seeing where it goes. I was really resistant to do the mini-bible. So I gave them something, but I really didn’t want to do it that way. They also knew about the film, so they commissioned six scripts for the first season that they were going to let me postpone until I finished this film, which is now. So in ten days, we’ll be full on with that. It’s been really good because I think I was waiting for the idea I really want, and I think I have that now. It’s not exactly Paris, it’s a European idea. So it will be Chloe [Sevigny] and Adam Brody. We’ll keep the pilot, that’s part of the story, but we’ll be going a different place with it."
- Whit Stillman, shortly before the world premiere of Love & Friendship at Sundance

The series was ultimately unrealized. In 2016, Amazon stated that: "Our agreements with the content provider don’t allow purchases of this title at this time."

"The bulk of the pilot of The Cosmopolitans involves several of Stillman’s signature subjects. The first is a party: the male trio, plus Aubrey, head to a soirée at the posh apartment of an arrogantly wealthy Parisian acquaintance (or perhaps a German in Paris), Fritz (Freddy Åsblom). For Stillman, parties are laboratories where possibilities arise suddenly from the close and quickly ricocheting contacts of social atoms—and where social rules, hidden beneath the murky surface of daily life, emerge more clearly, in ritualized isolation. The second is something that happens at the party: a dance, but a formally patterned one where the rules are the very subject."
- Richard Brody, 27 August 2014

=== 2016–present ===
On January 22, 2016 Entertainment Weekly reported that Stillman would direct a film version of one of Jane Austen's early short novels Lady Susan. This followed the indication that Little, Brown and Company would be publishing the screenplay adapted by Stillman. The film premiered in January 2016 at the Sundance Film Festival under the title of Love & Friendship reuniting Stillman with Kate Beckinsale and Chloë Sevigny. Although the plot of the film is adapted from Lady Susan, the actual title used (Love & Friendship) is from another, unrelated early epistolary novel by Austen, unpublished during her lifetime. It received universal acclaim from critics. The promotional announcement by Little, Brown and Company summarized Stillman's adaptation stating: "Recently widowed, Lady Susan arrives, unannounced, at her brother-in-law's estate to wait out colorful rumors about her dalliances circulating through polite society. While there, she becomes determined to secure a new husband for herself, and one for her reluctant debutante daughter, Frederica, too. As Lady Susan embarks on a controversial relationship with a married man, seduction, deception, broken hearts, and gossip all ensue. With a pitch-perfect Austenian sensibility, Stillman breathes new life into Austen's work, making it his own by adding original narration from a character comically loyal to the story's fiendishly manipulative heroine, Lady Susan."

In 2023, Deadline reported that Stillman would next direct the European rom-com adventure series The Splendid Affinities. In 2026, it was reported that Stillman would direct A Night at Claridge's, starring Adam Brody, Laura Carmichael, and Tom Bennett.

== Filmmaking style ==
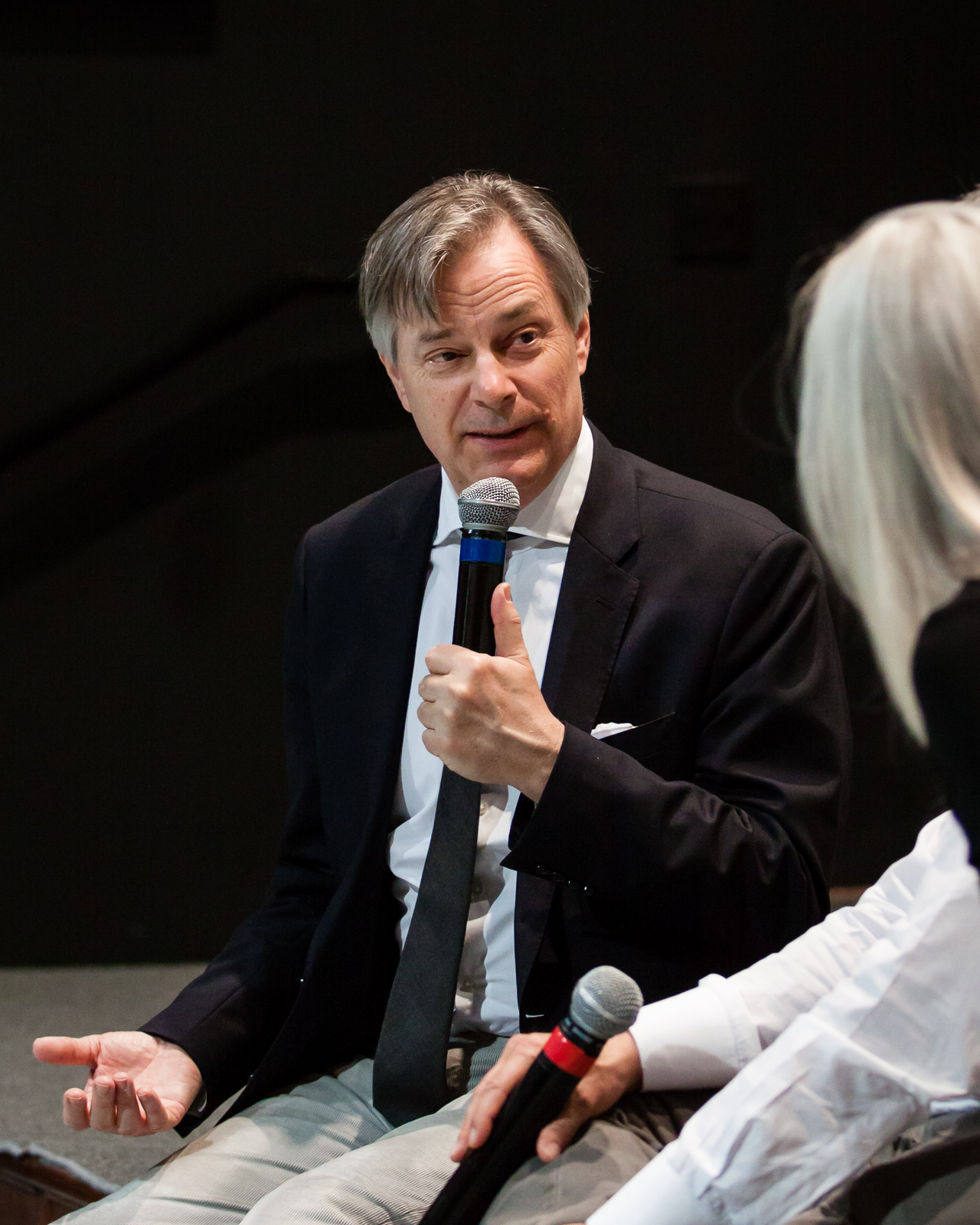
Stillman in 2017

Stillman wrote and directed three comedies of manners released in the 1990s: Metropolitan (1990), Barcelona (1994), and The Last Days of Disco (1998); he published a novel based on the last of these films in 2000. After completing his film trilogy, Stillman left independent comedy and started researching and writing a series of scripts set abroad. In August 1998 (shortly after The Last Days of Disco was released) he left his loft conversion in Manhattan's SoHo and moved to Paris. He returned to New York in 2010.

A fourth film, Damsels in Distress, was released in 2011, premiering out of competition as the closing film at the 68th Venice International Film Festival. The Guardian in 2012 compared Stillman to Terrence Malick, another filmmaker who has "come to owe a good part of their mystique to the very paucity of their oeuvre...The lengthy gaps in between (films) have created expectations that are hard to fulfil, and admirers have been inclined to overestimate their achievement." A reviewer at Salon wrote that the reason for the long gaps between his films is that "Stillman is sometimes simply too damn smart for his own good. You can't always tell at whom he's poking fun, or why, and it becomes unfortunately easy to typecast him as the WASP answer to Woody Allen and conclude that his movies are insufferably irritating documents of privilege. He himself is aware of that possibility the whole time, and bastes his entire worldview in a rueful, ironic-romantic glaze."

Stillman's effectiveness at the box-office has been mixed. He filmed Metropolitan for about $250,000, according to Stillman, with a box-office return of about $3 million. Barcelona was then filmed on a budget of under $3 million, returning just under $8 million. His third film was not a box-office success; its budget of $8 million returned about $3 million. Stillman, in an AOL interview following the twenty-fifth anniversary of Metropolitan, refers to himself as having been put into "director's prison" for more than 10 years before he made Damsels. His 2016 film Love & Friendship, a comedy based on a Jane Austen story, was a box-office success, grossing more than $20 million worldwide against a production budget of $3 million.

== Filmography ==
Film

Year	Title	Director	Writer	Producer
1990	Metropolitan	Yes	Yes	Yes
1994	Barcelona	Yes	Yes	Yes
1998	The Last Days of Disco	Yes	Yes	Yes
2011	Damsels in Distress	Yes	Yes	Yes
2016	Love & Friendship	Yes	Yes	Yes
TBA	A Night at Claridge's	Yes	Yes	Yes

Television

Year	Title	Notes
1996	Homicide: Life on the Street	Episode: "The Heart of a Saturday Night"
2014	The Cosmopolitans	Pilot (also writer)

== Awards and nominations ==
Year	Award	Category	Nominated work	Result	Ref.
1990	Academy Awards	Best Original Screenplay	Metropolitan	Nominated	
1990	Sundance Film Festival	Grand Jury Prize	Metropolitan	Nominated	
1990	Independent Spirit Awards	Best First Feature	Metropolitan	Nominated	
1990	Independent Spirit Awards	Best Screenplay	Metropolitan	Nominated	
1990	New York Film Critics Circle	Best New Director	Metropolitan	Won	
1990	New York Film Critics Circle	Best Screenplay	Metropolitan	Nominated	
1994	Torino International Film Festival	Best Feature Film	Barcelona	Nominated	
2014	Prix Fitzgerald	Novel	The Last Days of Disco	Won	
2016	Gotham Awards	Best Screenplay	Love & Friendship	Nominated	
2016	London Film Critics' Circle	Screenplay of the Year	Love & Friendship	Nominated	
2016	Dublin Film Critics' Circle	Best Screenplay	Love & Friendship	4th Place	
2016	IndieWire Critics Poll	Best Screenplay	Love & Friendship	3rd Place	
2016	Village Voice Film Poll	Best Screenplay	Love & Friendship	3rd Place	

== Honors and legacy ==
25-Year Wexner Center film retrospective

The Wexner Center for the Arts at the Ohio State University held a 25-year retrospective of the career and films of Stillman including his film titled Love & Friendship. At the time of the retrospective, Stillman was asked: "Your films all have a sort of costume drama sensibility, but without the costumes, and now you've made a costume drama, period dress and all." Stillman responded by stating that: "Love & Friendship doesn't loom as a costume drama, because it's a pretty funny comedy, so it's really not what you might anticipate. It's not Downton Abbey in any way, shape or form. There are a lot of very good English comic actors who have done the supporting parts and really shine. I love Jane Austen. I sort of wanted something of my own to work on between paid script writing assignments. It's good that I had so much time with no producer or studio executive wanting delivery quickly because it's an incredibly funny novella she wrote, but hard to read and hard to dramatize. It's an epistolary form from the 18th century and there are all these very funny ideas and lines buried within. It's kind of an inaccessible format and it was a long process of adaptation."

Criterion Collection Release

In April 2016, The Criterion Collection released a retrospective box set edition of Metropolitan, Barcelona, and The Last Days of Disco, available on Blu-ray and DVD. Stillman himself oversaw the digital transfers of the films and recorded audio commentaries along with members of the casts and crews.

== Published works ==
Stillman wrote a novelization of The Last Days of Disco published by Farrar, Straus and Giroux under the same title, with the added subtitle "...With Cocktails at Petrossian Afterwards". It won the French 2014 Prix Fitzgerald Award. Stillman also wrote the novelization of his 2016 film Love & Friendship.

Books

- Stillman, Whit (1994). Barcelona and Metropolitan: tales of two cities. Boston: Faber and Faber. ISBN 0571173659.
- Stillman, Whit (2000). The Last Days of Disco: With Cocktails at Petrossian Afterwards: a novel (1st ed.). New York: Farrar, Straus, and Giroux. ISBN 0374183392.
- Stillman, Whit (2015). Love & Friendship: An Adaptation of Jane Austen's Unfinished Novella Concerning the Beautiful Lady Susan Vernon, Her Loves and Friendships, and the Strange Antagonism of the DeCourcy Family. Little, Brown.

Articles

- Stillman, Whit (March 1981). "The Nation's Pulse". The American Spectator. Vol. 14, no. 3. pp. 23‒25.
- Stillman, Whit (November 1983). "New Frontier Days: A Camelot memoir". The American Spectator. Vol. 16, no. 11. pp. 24‒27.
- Stillman, Whit (December 22, 2000). "A preppy pantheon". Salon. Archived from the original on October 15, 2013.
- Stillman, Whit (November 3, 2006). "The Fortunes of Fantasyland". The Wall Street Journal. New York, NY. ISSN 0099-9660.
