= Hey Vern, It's Ernest! =

1988 American children's television program

- DVD cover
- Genre: Children's/Family; Comedy
- Directed by: John R. Cherry III; Coke Sams
- Starring: Jim Varney; Gailard Sartain; Bruce Arntson; Mac Bennett; Daniel Butler; Bill Byrge; Debi Derryberry; Mark Goldman; Denice Hicks; Jackie Welch
- Country of origin: United States
- Original language: English
- No. of seasons: 1
- No. of episodes: 13

Production
- Executive producers: John R. Cherry III; Andy Heyward; Robby London
- Producers: Coke Sams; Stacy Williams
- Running time: 18–22 minutes
- Production companies: Emshell Producers Group; DIC Enterprises

Original release
- Network: CBS
- Release: September 17 – December 24, 1988

Hey Vern, It's Ernest! is an American children's television program. It aired on Saturday mornings on CBS for one season in 1988. Each episode involved short sketches on a certain theme or scenario, featuring Ernest P. Worrell (Jim Varney), his unseen friend Vern, and various others. This format was a contractual requirement because of an agreement with The Walt Disney Company, the distributor of the Ernest film series, that forbade them from using full-episode narratives; in turn, Ernest was allowed to address the camera directly as he did in commercials, something Disney did not allow in the films. The filming locations were in Nashville, Tennessee, and Burbank, California. It was a production of Ernest creator John Cherry's production company, The Emshell Producers' Group, in association with CBS, and was co-produced with DIC Enterprises. The series was later rerun on The Family Channel in the early 1990s.

== Cast ==
Actor	Role
Jim Varney	Ernest P. Worrell, Auntie Nelda, Dr. Otto, Sergeant Glory, Baby Ernest, Astor Clement
Gailard Sartain	Chuck, Lonnie Don, Matt Finish
Bruce Arntson	Existo the Magician, Mike the Clown, Bill, various singers
Mac Bennett	Mac
Daniel Butler	Willie the Homemade Robot, Earl the Barber, Ernest's Tongue
Bill Byrge	Bobby
Debi Derryberry	Skeeter, various
Mark Goldman	Eddie, various
Denice Hicks	Mrs. Clown, various singers
Jackie Welch	Mrs. Simon Simmons, Coo, various singers

== Recurring sketches and characters ==
- Lonnie Don's School of Hollywood Sound Effects: A fictional sound effects wizard demonstrates how to make a sound from one of his movies. His name, which originated with Sartain's ultimately deleted role in The Jerk, is a pun of the phrase "la de da". The procedure is always the same: he places the meaty part of his hand over his mouth and blows a raspberry.
- Haircut: Ernest walks into Earl the Barber's shop and asks him to make him look like a "Wall Street tycoon". However, the barber always misunderstands him, and instead fanatically styles his hair into something that rhymes with the word "tycoon" (e.g., a "baby baboon", a "clock set on noon", "large feet in a cartoon", a "deadbeat raccoon", etc.) Whatever the hairstyle is, Ernest initially is aghast, but then stares at it thoughtfully in the mirror and says, "It could work".
- Sergeant Glory: Varney plays a fast-talking military Sergeant teaching a class of recruits about the subject of the day. He gives them two rules to remember, the second of which is almost always "Obey all rules". The character originated in an ad for Purity milk a short while before the character of Ernest was created (in "Hobbies", the rules were both "They seldom stand").
- My Father the Clown: A spoof on family-friendly sitcoms which featured a professional clown, his stay-at-home wife, and two kids: an aspiring clown (Skeeter) and his strait-laced brother (Eddie) who is routinely the victim of the antics.
- Existo the Magician: A clumsy magician who stumbles over his words, and attempts to perform tricks that always go awry. He is absent in the episode "Food". Existo would become the title character in a 1999 underground film, with Arntson reprising his role.
- Matt Finish: A self-described "photographer at large" who loves taking pictures of everything. His name is a pun on matte finish, a type of non-glossy photo paper.
- Mrs. Simon Simmons' Mind Your Manners: A spoof of Emily Post, Mrs. Simon Simmons teaches the ways of proper etiquette, but in many cases, breaks other norms of social protocol in the process. She is absent in the episode "Pets", "Food", and "School".
- Ernest's Tongue: Ernest's tongue talks about certain tongue-related things and gets sprayed with different kinds of food.
- Mac and George: Mac and his "roommate" George, an Iguana who supposedly can do many of the same things a person can.
- Chuck and Bobby: Chuck and his brother Bobby (who rarely speaks), get themselves into various adventures. These two characters made appearances together in Ernest Saves Christmas as the Orlando Airport's storage agents and Ernest Goes to Jail as security guards for a bank while Bobby made an appearance with his younger brother, Tom in Ernest Scared Stupid. Bobby's final film appearance was in Ernest Goes to School.
- Willie the Robot: A homemade robot with a bucket head and a 1970s "Have a nice day" Smiley face. The robot originally appeared in Dr. Otto and the Riddle of the Gloom Beam.
- Baby Ernest: Ernest as a baby (Varney's head in a Marc Weiner-style head puppet) notes his confusion when he overhears his parents use a figure of speech and takes it literally, concluding each time with the phrase "Boy, grownups sure talk funny. KnowhatImean?"
- Woody: A ventriloquist dummy who looks like Ernest.
- Dust Bunny: A dusty rabbit, named after dust bunnies, who appears to live under dusty furniture, and always gets in and out of the picture by sneezing.
- Dr. Otto: The main character from Dr. Otto and the Riddle of the Gloom Beam would sometimes be featured in his lab creating new things. When he feels he has a great idea, he would sometimes exclaim "Viola!" ("Voila!") or "Eureka, California!" ("Eureka!")
- Auntie Nelda: A cantankerous old woman, a regular in Carden & Cherry's other commercials and films, who appears in at least one sketch each episode.
- Bill and Coo: A country music duo who sing sad but funny songs. They only appeared in two episodes, "Pets" and "School".

== Episodes ==
No.	Title	Original release date
1	"Hey Vern, It's Outer Space"	September 17, 1988
Ernest tries to get rid of a strange, bomb-like device that he thinks is an alien weapon which eventually turns out to be Doctor Otto's toaster.
2	"Hey Vern, It's Clothing"	September 24, 1988
Ernest and Vern throw a costume party for their neighbors, but Ernest cannot decide what to go as. He decides to be a chicken and invites everyone in the neighborhood, but Auntie Nelda calls the police to arrest Ernest for playing loud music.
3	"Hey Vern, It's Scary Things"	October 1, 1988
After reading a ghost story, Ernest braves the dark corners of Vern's house in search of the Boogeyman and tries to catch it.
4	"Hey Vern, It's Movies"	October 8, 1988
Ernest enters a home movie contest.
5	"Hey Vern, It's Magic"	October 15, 1988
Ernest makes Vern's dog Shorty disappear and cannot bring him back. Ernest later falls into the magic box while searching for Shorty, but the missing dog does eventually show up to him.
6	"Hey Vern, It's Sports"	October 22, 1988
"Ernest the Furnace" makes the mistake of challenging the pro wrestler "Chainsaw Chester" to a match.
7	"Hey Vern, It's Pets"	October 29, 1988
Ernest opens a pet day care center in Vern's house in order to save up $100.00 for his own puppy.
8	"Hey Vern, It's Hobbies"	November 5, 1988
Ernest tries to help Vern capture the rare Orange Honey-Woney butterfly for his collection.
9	"Hey Vern, It's Food"	November 12, 1988
Everyone competes in a neighborhood bake off, with Ernest entering his grandmother's blue ribbon surprise recipe.
10	"Hey Vern, It's Holidays"	December 3, 1988
Ernest sets the world record for celebrating every major holiday of the year in one day. The final holiday is Vern's birthday.
11	"Hey Vern, It's School"	December 10, 1988
Ernest tries to finish his classes in school in order to earn a flashy wrist watch.
12	"Hey Vern, It's Lost & Found"	December 17, 1988
Ernest searches for a treasure that is buried under Vern's house.
13	"Hey Vern, It's Talent"	December 24, 1988
Ernest enters the neighborhood talent show, but has a hidden talent.

== Releases ==
Various episodes were released on home video in the late 1980s-early 1990s.

DIC streamed several episodes for free viewing on their KEWL Cartoons website until KewlCartoons became Jaroo.

Mill Creek Entertainment released a two-disc DVD set containing all thirteen episodes on January 18, 2011. This release has been discontinued and is out of print. Mill Creek later re-released the complete series set on DVD in February 2017.

== Awards ==
Year	Award	Category	Recipient
1989	Daytime Emmy Award	Outstanding Performer in a Children's Series	Jim Varney
1989	Daytime Emmy Award	Outstanding Achievement in Graphics and Title Design	Joel Anderson and Barbara Laszewski
