= Gailard Sartain =

American actor (1943–2025)

- Born: September 18, 1943; Tulsa, Oklahoma, U.S.
- Died: June 19, 2025 (aged 81); Tulsa, Oklahoma, U.S.
- Occupations: actor; comedian; painter; illustrator
- Years active: 1970–2005

Gailard Lee Sartain Jr. (September 18, 1943 – June 19, 2025) was an American actor who frequently played characters with roots in the South. He was a regular on the country music variety series Hee Haw and was also known for his roles in three of the Ernest movies and the TV series Hey Vern, It's Ernest!, which ran for one season on CBS in 1988. He was also a successful painter and illustrator.

== Early life and education ==
Gailard Lee Sartain, Jr. was born in Tulsa, Oklahoma on September 18, 1943, the son of Elizabeth Bell Sartain and Gailard Lee Sartain, Sr. His father served as a Fire Chief in Tulsa from 1956–1964. He attended Cascia Hall Preparatory School but was expelled for poor grades, leading him to attend public Will Rogers High School in Tulsa, where he was in the Art Club and the Senior Play; it was at Will Rogers High School where Sartain, still experiencing culture shock from the far more casual environment of public school, began developing his style of humor. He was a member of the Epsilon Mu chapter of Kappa Sigma fraternity at the University of Tulsa, from which he graduated with a Bachelor of Fine Arts degree. In 1968, Gailard moved to New York City, where he worked as an assistant to illustrator Paul Davis.

== Acting career ==
Sartain's entry into entertainment was launched in Tulsa in 1970. Working originally as a cameraman at a local television station, he approached the station director when a previous disc jockey was fired from his position as the station's late-night host; the director initially intended to fire Sartain as well but relented and gave Sartain a three-episode pilot order. The result was a late night off-the-wall comedy program entitled The Uncanny Film Festival and Camp Meeting. Dressed as a wizard, wearing a dark blue robe and pointed wizard's cap, Sartain hosted the program as "Dr. Mazeppa Pompazoidi". Other cast members included fellow Tulsa native Gary Busey and Jim Millaway (September 23, 1941 – December 23, 2023). The program was broadcast on the Tulsa CBS affiliate KOTV and later the ABC affiliate KTUL. It featured B-movies, with skits written and performed by Sartain, Busey and company between the movie segments.

A year into his run as Mazeppa, Roy Clark's agent asked to be on the program, which led to an offer to join the cast of Hee Haw. Sartain initially declined but accepted in 1972 when he realized it would be a substantial increase in salary. He began as a background character but worked his way up to one of the show's most prominent stars and remained as a regular cast member of the popular show for nearly 20 seasons. He also served as a regular on other series including The Sonny & Cher Show (1975–77) and Shields and Yarnell (1978). Sartain played C.D. Parker for one episode during the pilot season of Walker, Texas Ranger. He supplied the voice of a social worker in the pilot episode of the animated series King of the Hill. Sartain also portrayed an advisor to Louisiana Governor Earl Long (played by Paul Newman) in the movie Blaze.

Sartain appeared in more than forty motion pictures, most notably as The Big Bopper (alongside Busey's Buddy Holly) in The Buddy Holly Story, Sheriff Ray Stuckey in Mississippi Burning, The Outsiders, The Hollywood Knights, Fried Green Tomatoes, The Replacements as Offensive Assistant Coach Leo Pilachowski, The Big Easy, The Grifters, Getting Even with Dad, The Patriot, and an uncredited role in the 1994 comedy Wagons East starring John Candy and Richard Lewis. Sartain also appeared in a deleted scene from the Steve Martin comedy The Jerk as a Texas oil millionaire who successfully begs for $1500 (in cash) to replace the cracked leather seats on his private airplane: "You know what this means? I can fly my friends to the Super Bowl like a man, not like some kinda god-danged bum!" He considered his excised role in The Jerk to be his funniest on-screen performance.

Sartain also appeared in Mel McDaniel's music video for "Stand Up" in 1985 as well as Michael Johnson's live performance video of "Give Me Wings" in 1986.

In 1999 he starred in “Existo”, as a nightclub owner and revolutionary named Collette.

His final film role was in 2005, in Cameron Crowe's Elizabethtown. He is also known for his roles in three of the Ernest P. Worrell films starring Jim Varney (as well as the Hey Vern, It's Ernest! television series). With fellow Hey Vern co-star Bill Byrge of Nashville, the duo performed as brothers Chuck and Bobby in a series of "Me and my brother, Bobby..." pitches for local TV stations and product ads.

He was replaced by a younger brother named Tom Tulip (Dallas native John Cadenhead) in Ernest Scared Stupid.

== Art career ==
A successful illustrator, Sartain's artistic credits range from record cover designs for such artists as Leon Russell (Will O' the Wisp) to illustrations for nationally published magazines.

In 2001, Sartain was asked to design the artwork for that year’s Mayfest festival, an art festival held annually in his hometown of Tulsa. “I wanted it to have vibrant colors, so I just let myself go with it," Sartain said. "I used all of my memories to try to capture a Tulsa flavor." His artwork was described as:

...colorful and wacky as its creator...The original "RiverView" artwork, done with acrylic paint, shows a turquoise river making its way past green fields with trees and flowers into Tulsa's downtown, where each building is wavy and a different color. In the dark blue, starry sky, there is a layer of pillowy clouds and an irregular-shaped, yellow sun. And in the upper left-hand corner is a rainbow pulled back against the edge of the painting like a drape. “I'm better known for my acting gigs, but this is recognition of my artistic side. I was proud to do it," said Sartain.

== Personal life and death ==
Sartain and his wife, Mary Jo, were married on New Year’s Eve in 1988. They remained married for over 36 years until his death and had three children.

Sartain died of natural causes on June 19, 2025, in his hometown of Tulsa, at the age of 81. (Note: Some news sources mislabel his age as "78".) No other cause of death was stated other than his wife's humorous statement: "Actually, he died of silliness."

In 2026, he was posthumously inducted into the Tulsa Hall of Fame.

== Filmography ==
=== Film ===
Year	Title	Role	Notes
1975	Nashville	Man at Lunch Table	Uncredited
1978	The Buddy Holly Story	The Big Bopper	
1979	The Jerk	Guy with Cracked Airplane Seats	Uncredited
1980	The Hollywood Knights	Bimbeau	
1980	Roadie	B.B. Muldoon	
1981	Hard Country	Johnny Bob	
1982	Endangered Species	Mayor	
1983	The Outsiders	Jerry	
1984	Choose Me	Mueller	
1984	All of Me	Fulton Norris	
1984	Songwriter	Mulreaux	
1985	Trouble in Mind	Fat Adolph	
1986	Uphill All the Way	Private	
1986	The Big Easy	Chef Paul	
1987	Ernest Goes to Camp	Jake	
1987	Made in Heaven	Sam Morrell	
1988	The Moderns	New York Critic	
1988	Ernest Saves Christmas	Chuck	
1988	Mississippi Burning	Sheriff Ray Stuckey	
1989	Blaze	LaGrange	
1990	Love at Large	Taxi Driver	
1990	Ernest Goes to Jail	Chuck	
1990	The Grifters	Joe	
1991	Guilty by Suspicion	Chairman Wood	
1991	Fried Green Tomatoes	Ed Couch	
1992	Stop! Or My Mom Will Shoot	Munroe	
1992	Equinox	Dandridge	
1992	Wishman	Dr. Abe Rogers	
1993	The Real McCoy	Gary Buckner	
1994	Clean Slate	Judge Block	
1994	Getting Even with Dad	Carl	
1994	Wagons East	J.P. Moreland	Uncredited
1994	Speechless	Lee Cutler	
1996	The Spitfire Grill	Sheriff Gary Walsh	
1997	Murder in Mind	Charlie	
1997	RocketMan	Mr. Randall	Uncredited
1998	The Patriot	Floyd Chisolm	
1999	The All New Adventures of Laurel & Hardy in For Love or Mummy	Oliver Hardy	Direct-to-video
1999	Existo	Colette	
2000	The Replacements	Pilachowski	
2001	Ali	Gordon B. Davidson	
2005	Elizabethtown	Charles Dean	

=== Television ===
Year	Title	Role	Notes
1972–1974	Hee Haw	Sheriff Orville B. Bullmoose	Recurring role, uncredited
1976–1977	The Sonny and Cher Show	Various	Recurring role
1983	The Dukes of Hazzard	A.C. Tate Jr.	1 episode
1987	9 to 5	Corky	1 episode
1988	Hey Vern, It's Ernest!	Chuck/Lonnie Don/Matt Finish	Main role
1993	Cooperstown	Georgia State Trooper	Television film
1993	Walker, Texas Ranger	C.D. Parker	1 episode
1995	Chicago Hope	Senator Thompson	1 episode
1997	King of the Hill	Case Manager (voice)	1 episode
1997	The Pretender	Tug Beualieu	1 episode
1997	The Simpsons	Big Daddy (voice)	1 episode
1997	Arli$$	Hubert Lynch	1 episode
1997	Joe Torre: Curveballs Along the Way	Don Zimmer	Television film
1999	That Championship Season	High School Principal	Television film, uncredited
1999	Pirates of Silicon Valley	Ed Roberts	Television film
1999	The Angry Beavers	Big O (voice)	1 episode
