= Cardinal Valley, Lexington =

Cardinal Valley
- Neighborhood of Lexington, Kentucky
- Interactive map of Cardinal Valley
- Coordinates: 38.052°N 84.539°W
- Country: United States
- State: Kentucky
- County: Fayette
- City: Lexington

Area
  - Total: 0.69 sq mi (1.79 km^{2})

Population (2000)
  - Total: 2,707
  - Density: 3,917/sq mi (1,512.3/km^{2})
- Time zone: UTC-5 (Eastern (EST))
  - Summer (DST): UTC-4 (EDT)
- ZIP code: 40504
- Area code: 859

Cardinal Valley is a neighborhood in northwestern Lexington, Kentucky, United States. Its boundaries are Versailles Road to the south, Norfolk Southern railroad tracks to the north, Forbes Road to the east, and Cambridge Drive/Oxford Circle to the west.

Established in the late 1950s through the early 1960s. Cardinal Valley was a typical post-war baby-boomer sub-division filled with young families. Most homes were pre-fab (some by National Homes) and originally cost between $10,000-$15,000.

Cardinal Valley Elementary School on Mandalay Road was completed in time for the 1962 school year. The school originally had 2 wings with grades 1 through 3 housed in the east wing, and grades 4 through 6 in the west wing. A one and two-story addition at the end of the west wing was completed in 1967 to accommodate the school's new library and expanding fifth and sixth grade classes.

Cardinal Valley Park was the predecessor to Valley Park and was located in the front parking lot of Cardinal Valley School during the summer months. After several years, Valley Park was erected in the north-east section of the neighborhood, accessed from Deauville Dr.

In recent decades, Cardinal Valley has become the hub of Hispanic immigrant culture in Lexington.

Cardinal Valley was also the childhood home of comedian Jim Varney who is best known for his roles as character "Ernest P. Worrell" in numerous commercials, TV specials, and cinema.

== Neighborhood statistics ==
- Population in 2000: 2,707
- Land area: 0.690 square miles (1.79 km^{2})
- Population density: 3,924 people per square mile (1,515 people/km^{2})
- Median income: $34,478
