= Silver Screen Partners =

American entertainment partnership

Silver Screen Partners L.P.
- Type: Limited Partnership
- Founded: June 8, 1983; 43 years ago
- Founder: Roland W. Betts
- Defunct: 1992; 34 years ago
- Fate: Dissolved
- Successor: Touchwood Pacific Partners
- Headquarters: New York City, New York, United States
- Total equity: Partners: $83 million; Partners II: $193 million; Partners III: $300 million; Partners IV: $400 million
- Owner: Silver Screen Management, Inc. (Managing partner); limited partners; Partners: 13,000; Partners II: 28,000; Partners III: 44,000; Partners IV: 52,000; Thorn EMI; The Cannon Group, Inc.; Home Box Office, Inc.
- Divisions: Silver Screen Partners, L.P.; Silver Screen Partners II, L.P.; Silver Screen Partners III, L.P.; Silver Screen Partners IV, L.P.

Silver Screen Partners refers to four limited partnerships (Note: Silver Screen Partners, Silver Screen Partners II, Silver Screen Partners III, and Silver Screen Partners IV) organized as an alternative funding source for film production originally formed by American investor Roland W. Betts as a collaboration with cable television network HBO in 1983. The managing general partner for the partnerships was Silver Screen Management, Inc.

Silver Screen Partners entered into an agreement with The Walt Disney Company beginning in 1985 to collaborate with the Walt Disney Pictures, Walt Disney Feature Animation, Touchstone Pictures, and Hollywood Pictures studios to produce works such as The Great Mouse Detective; Return to Oz; The Black Cauldron; Volunteers; Down and Out in Beverly Hills; Three Men and a Baby; Good Morning, Vietnam; Cocktail; Oliver & Company; Dead Poets Society; Who Framed Roger Rabbit; Honey, I Shrunk the Kids; Turner & Hooch; The Little Mermaid; Pretty Woman; Dick Tracy; The Rescuers Down Under; Beauty and the Beast; and Encino Man. Despite a string of successful films, Silver Screen Partners became defunct in 1992.

Former U.S. President George W. Bush was a member of Silver Screen Management, Inc.'s board of directors from 1983 to 1993. When Bush first ran for president in 2000, his membership on the board was scrutinized by the media over his attacks on Hollywood's perceived "pervasiveness of violence", particularly regarding the financing of the cult thriller film The Hitcher.

== History ==
The original Silver Screen Partners L.P. was organized by New York film investment broker Roland W. Betts to fund movies for HBO on April 19, 1983, and officially formed in Delaware on June 8 of that year. The limited partnerships (13,000) sold through EF Hutton were oversubscribed and raised $83 million. HBO made a 50 percent guarantee on their investment for exclusive cable rights. Another 40% was guaranteed by Thorn EMI, a British firm, for foreign distribution and foreign TV and videocassette markets. Additional income was lined up for domestic videocassette sales. HBO's film division was just starting out so film output was slow. For the Silver Screen/HBO films, the partnership was active in the process from selecting film pitches and negotiating release dates with the distributor. In 1984, the first HBO/Silver Screen movie, Flashpoint, was released through TriStar Pictures as were all the HBO/Silver Screen films.

Silver Screen Partners II, L.P. began financing films for The Walt Disney Company in 1985 with $193 million from 20,000 limited partners. Silver Screen was hands-off with Disney given its name and new management team led by Michael Eisner, formerly at Paramount. HBO was expecting that Silver Screen would return to them for its third limited partnership. However, in January 1987, Silver Screen Partners III began financing movies for Disney with $300 million raised, the largest amount raised for a film financing limited partnership by EF Hutton.

Silver Screen's fourth limited partnership, Silver Screen Partners IV, was also set up to finance Disney's studios. On October 23, 1990, The Walt Disney Company formed Touchwood Pacific Partners which supplanted the Silver Screen Partnership series as their movie studios' primary source of funding.

In 1991, Silver Screen Partners III, L.P. was among a group of production companies were sued for copyright infringement over Who Framed Roger Rabbit's "End Title" song.

== Structure ==
The partnerships paid for the movie's production costs and shared in the gross dollars in all markets from theater to television. Limited partners received their return before the production company could defray any of their expenses. This is preferred by investors as it guarantees some return if the film fails or has budget overrun and from the producer's overhead. Profits from a single film cannot be used to cover losses on other films, making the partnership somewhat risky.

== List of notable Silver Screen Partners films ==
| Title | Release date | Co-Production with | Budget | Gross |
|---|---|---|---|---|
| Footloose | February 17, 1984 | Paramount Pictures | | |
| Flashpoint | August 31, 1984 | HBO Films | | |
| Heaven Help Us | February 8, 1985 | HBO Films | | |
| Baby: Secret of the Lost Legend | March 22, 1985 | Touchstone Pictures | | $14,972,297 |
| Return to Oz | June 21, 1985 | Walt Disney Pictures | $25,000,000 | $11,137,801 |
| The Black Cauldron | July 24, 1985 | Walt Disney Pictures and Walt Disney Productions | $25,000,000 | $21,288,692 |
| My Science Project | August 9, 1985 | Touchstone Pictures | | $4,122,748 |
| Volunteers | August 16, 1985 | HBO Films | | |
| The Journey of Natty Gann | September 27, 1985 | Walt Disney Pictures | N/A | $9,708,373 |
| Sweet Dreams | October 2, 1985 | HBO Films | | |
| One Magic Christmas | November 22, 1985 | Walt Disney Pictures | N/A | $13,677,222 |
| Head Office | January 3, 1986 | HBO Films | | |
| Down and Out in Beverly Hills | January 31, 1986 | Touchstone Pictures | $14 million | $91,411,255 |
| The Hitcher | February 21, 1986 | HBO Films | | |
| Odd Jobs | March 1986 | HBO Films | | |
| Off Beat | April 11, 1986 | Touchstone Pictures | | $4,117,061 |
| Ruthless People | June 27, 1986 | Touchstone Pictures | | $71,233,101 |
| The Great Mouse Detective | July 2, 1986 | Walt Disney Pictures and Walt Disney Feature Animation | $14 million | $38,625,550 |
| Tough Guys | October 3, 1986 | The Bryna Company and Touchstone Pictures | $18 million | $21,458,229 |
| The Color of Money | October 17, 1986 | Touchstone Pictures | $13,800,000 | $76,728,982 |
| Outrageous Fortune | January 30, 1987 | Touchstone Pictures | $25 million | $65,864,741 |
| Tin Men | March 6, 1987 | Touchstone Pictures | $11,000,000 | $25,411,386 |
| Ernest Goes to Camp | May 22, 1987 | Touchstone Pictures | $3,500,000 | $23,509,382 |
| Benji the Hunted | June 17, 1987 | Walt Disney Pictures and Mulberry Square Productions | | $22,257,624 |
| Adventures in Babysitting | July 1, 1987 | Touchstone Pictures | $7 million | $34,368,475 |
| Stakeout | August 5, 1987 | Touchstone Pictures | $28,215,000 | $65,673,233 |
| Can't Buy Me Love | August 14, 1987 | Touchstone Pictures and The Mount Company | | $31,623,833 |
| Hello Again | November 6, 1987 | Touchstone Pictures | | $20,419,446 |
| Three Men and a Baby | November 25, 1987 | Touchstone Pictures | $15 million | $167,780,960 |
| Good Morning, Vietnam | December 23, 1987 | Touchstone Pictures | $13 million | $123,922,370 |
| Shoot to Kill | February 12, 1988 | Touchstone Pictures | | $29,300,090 |
| D.O.A. | March 18, 1988 | Touchstone Pictures | $3.5 million | $12,706,478 |
| Return to Snowy River | April 15, 1988 | Walt Disney Pictures, Burrowes Film Group and Hoyts Film Partnership | | $13,687,027 |
| Big Business | June 10, 1988 | Touchstone Pictures | $20 million | $40,150,487 |
| Who Framed Roger Rabbit | June 22, 1988 | Touchstone Pictures and Amblin Entertainment | $50,587,000 | $329,803,958 |
| Cocktail | July 29, 1988 | Touchstone Pictures and Interscope Communications | $6,000,000 | $171,504,781 |
| The Rescue | August 5, 1988 | Touchstone Pictures | | $5,855,392 |
| Heartbreak Hotel | September 30, 1988 | Touchstone Pictures | | $5,509,417 |
| The Good Mother | November 4, 1988 | Touchstone Pictures | $14 million | $4,764,606 |
| Ernest Saves Christmas | November 11, 1988 | Touchstone Pictures | $6,000,000 (estimate) | $28,202,109 |
| Oliver & Company | November 18, 1988 | Walt Disney Pictures and Walt Disney Feature Animation | | $74,151,346 |
| Beaches | December 21, 1988 | Touchstone Pictures and All Girl Productions | | $57,041,866 |
| Three Fugitives | January 27, 1989 | Touchstone Pictures | $15,000,000 | $40,586,886 |
| Disorganized Crime | April 14, 1989 | Touchstone Pictures and Kouf/Bigelow Productions | $20 million | $7,724,000 |
| Dead Poets Society | June 9, 1989 | Touchstone Pictures | $16.4 million | $235,860,116 |
| Honey, I Shrunk the Kids | June 23, 1989 | Walt Disney Pictures | $18 million | $222,724,172 |
| Turner & Hooch | July 28, 1989 | Touchstone Pictures | $42 million | $71,079,915 |
| Cheetah | August 18, 1989 | Walt Disney Pictures | $5 million | $8,153,677 |
| An Innocent Man | October 6, 1989 | Touchstone Pictures and Sandollar Productions | | $20,047,604 |
| Gross Anatomy | October 20, 1989 | Touchstone Pictures | $25 million | $11,604,598 |
| The Little Mermaid | November 17, 1989 | Walt Disney Pictures and Walt Disney Feature Animation | $40 million | $211,343,479 |
| Blaze | December 13, 1989 | Touchstone Pictures | $18 million | $19,131,246 |
| Where the Heart Is | February 23, 1990 | Touchstone Pictures | $22 million | $1,106,475 |
| Pretty Woman | March 23, 1990 | Touchstone Pictures | $14 million | $463,407,268 |
| Ernest Goes to Jail | April 6, 1990 | Touchstone Pictures | $9,000,000 | $25,029,569 |
| Spaced Invaders | April 27, 1990 | Touchstone Pictures | $5,000,000 | $15,369,573 |
| Fire Birds | May 25, 1990 | Touchstone Pictures | | $14,760,451 |
| Dick Tracy | June 15, 1990 | Touchstone Pictures | $46 million | $162,738,726 |
| Betsy's Wedding | June 22, 1990 | Touchstone Pictures | $36 million | $19,740,070 |
| Taking Care of Business | August 17, 1990 | Hollywood Pictures | $14 million | $20,005,435 |
| Mr. Destiny | October 12, 1990 | Touchstone Pictures | $19 million | $15,379,253 |
| The Rescuers Down Under | November 16, 1990 | Walt Disney Pictures and Walt Disney Feature Animation | | $27,931,461 |
| Three Men and a Little Lady | November 21, 1990 | Touchstone Pictures | | $71,609,321 |
| Green Card | December 23, 1990 | Touchstone Pictures | | $29,888,235 |
| White Fang | January 18, 1991 | Walt Disney Pictures and Hybrid Productions Inc. | $14 million | $34,793,160 |
| Run | February 1, 1991 | Hollywood Pictures | | $4,409,328 |
| Scenes from a Mall | February 22, 1991 | Touchstone Pictures | $3 million | $9,563,393 |
| The Marrying Man | April 5, 1991 | Hollywood Pictures | $26 million | $12,454,768 |
| Oscar | April 26, 1991 | Touchstone Pictures | $35 million | $23,562,716 |
| One Good Cop | May 3, 1991 | Hollywood Pictures | | $11,276,846 |
| Wild Hearts Can't Be Broken | May 24, 1991 | Walt Disney Pictures and Pegasus Entertainment | | $7,294,835 |
| The Rocketeer | June 21, 1991 | Walt Disney Pictures, Touchstone Pictures and The Gordon Company | $42,000,000 | $62,000,000 |
| The Doctor | July 24, 1991 | Touchstone Pictures | $24 million | $38,120,905 |
| V.I. Warshawski | July 26, 1991 | Hollywood Pictures | $24 million | $11,128,309 |
| True Identity | August 23, 1991 | Touchstone Pictures | $15 million | $4,693,236 |
| Deceived | September 27, 1991 | Touchstone Pictures | $30 million | $28,738,096 |
| Ernest Scared Stupid | October 11, 1991 | Touchstone Pictures | $9,600,000 | $14,143,280 |
| Beauty and the Beast | November 22, 1991 | Walt Disney Pictures and Walt Disney Feature Animation | $25 million | $418,460,691 |
| Blame It on the Bellboy | March 6, 1992 | Hollywood Pictures | | $3,104,545 |
| Newsies | April 10, 1992 | Walt Disney Pictures | $15 million | $2,819,485 |
| Encino Man | May 22, 1992 | Hollywood Pictures | $7 million | $40.7 million |
