= Barry Scott (actor) =

American actor (1955–2020)

- Born: William Barry Scott; January 27, 1955; Nashville, Tennessee, U.S.
- Died: September 10, 2020 (aged 65); Nashville, Tennessee, U.S.
- Occupation(s): Actor, voice-over artist, voice actor

William Barry Scott (January 27, 1955 – September 10, 2020) was an American actor and voice-over artist.

== Early life ==
Scott was born in Nashville, Tennessee. He attended Tennessee State University, and founded the American Negro Playwright Theatre.

== Career ==
Scott had an extensive career on stage, and penned several stage-plays, including Ain't Got Long to Stay Here, a tribute to Martin Luther King Jr. He also appeared in several feature films, notably Ernest Goes to Jail (1990) and its sequel Ernest Scared Stupid (1991).

In addition, he was known for lending his voice to many broadcast commercials and public-service announcements, and was a voice-over artist for the National Basketball Association (NBA) and Total Nonstop Action Wrestling (TNA), where he was referred to as "the voice of TNA Wrestling".

In 1993, he was named Nashvillian of the Year for his work on stage.

In 2008, Scott narrated the words of Abraham Lincoln in two large-scale orchestral works: A Lincoln Address, by American composer Vincent Persichetti, and A Lincoln Portrait, by American composer Aaron Copland; both pieces were recorded with the Nashville Symphony under the baton of conductor Leonard Slatkin.

== Death ==
Scott died in Nashville on September 10, 2020, at the age of 65. The cause of death was stage IV colon cancer.

== Filmography ==
=== Film ===
Year	Title	Role	Notes
1970	Goodbye Gemini	Audrey	
1985	Operation Julie	Billy Hill	Television film
1990	Ernest Goes to Jail	Rubin Bartlett	
1991	Ernest Scared Stupid	Another Parent	
1995	The Expert	Capt. Jackson	
1999	Existo	Bernard Ozak	
1999	Blue Valley Songbird	Ruby's Bartender	
2002	Jeremiah Strong	Jeremiah Strong	Short film
2008	Excerpts from an Interview with Ed Hemingway	Ed Hemingway	Short film
2016	Hav Faith	Bishop Lance James	
2018	The Dead Center	Motel Owner	

=== Television ===
Year	Title	Role	Notes
1990–1993	In the Heat of the Night	Minister / Nathan Baxter	3 episodes
1992	I'll Fly Away	Deacon	Episode: "Master Magician"
2000	The Magnificent Seven	Barman	Episode: "Serpents"
