= Ernest Goes to Camp =

1987 film by John R. Cherry III

- Theatrical release poster
- Directed by: John R. Cherry III
- Written by: John R. Cherry III; Coke Sams
- Produced by: Stacy Williams
- Starring: Jim Varney
- Cinematography: Harry Mathias; Jim May
- Edited by: Marshall Harvey
- Music by: Shane Keister
- Production companies: Touchstone Pictures; Silver Screen Partners III; Emshell Producers Group
- Distributed by: Buena Vista Pictures Distribution
- Release date: May 22, 1987
- Running time: 93 minutes
- Country: United States
- Language: English
- Budget: $3.5 million
- Box office: $23.5 million

Ernest Goes to Camp is a 1987 American comedy film directed by John R. Cherry III that he co-wrote with Coke Sams. It stars Jim Varney, Victoria Racimo, Lyle Alzado, Iron Eyes Cody and John Vernon. It is the second film to feature the character Ernest P. Worrell (after Dr. Otto and the Riddle of the Gloom Beam) and the first film in the Ernest series.

It was released on May 22, 1987, and grossed $23.5 million. The next film in the series, Ernest Saves Christmas was released in November 1988.

== Plot ==
Long ago, a young Plains warrior is tested for initiation by being the target of three different weapons.

Centuries later, Ernest P. Worrell works as a maintenance man at Kamp Kikakee but hopes to become a counselor. He quickly becomes a valuable addition to the staff, as he is skilled at Plains Indian Sign Language, used by Kikakee's owner, Chief St. Cloud.

A small group of juvenile delinquents, the Second Chancers, come to Kikakee. Head Counselor Tipton assigns Kikakee's most experienced counselor, Ross Stennis, to be the boys' counselor. Stennis is unhappy with this assignment, and he treats the boys harshly. He ultimately goes too far by intentionally causing "Moose" Jones, the smallest boy in the group, to nearly drown in the lake while swimming. After Moose is rescued by Ernest, the boys retaliate against Stennis's cruelty by toppling his lifeguard perch into the lake, breaking Stennis' leg in the process. Since Stennis is no longer able to perform his duties as a counselor, and because Kikakee is already shorthanded, Tipton offers Stennis' position to Ernest. The trouble does not stop, as fellow camper Pennington and his friends also continue to target Ernest and any new arrivals.

The Second Chancers initially give Ernest trouble, but they start to show some respect during a campfire session when Nurse St. Cloud, the Chief's granddaughter, translates her grandfather's description of the warrior initiation ritual for his tribe. The initiate must hold still while a knife, a stone hatchet, and an arrow are thrown or shot at him. The courage of the young warrior apparently alters the course of each weapon to prevent it from striking him. The Second Chancers later build a tepee only to see it get burned. They fight Pennington and his friends, as they were responsible for the fire. Tipton is poised to expel the Second Chancers, but Ernest convinces him otherwise.

Meanwhile, a mining corporation run by Sherman Krader wants to mine the petrocite at Kikakee, but Chief St. Cloud refuses to sell the land. Upon realizing that the Chief does not speak English, Krader manipulates Ernest into obtaining the Chief's signature under false pretenses. Ernest, thinking that he is helping the Chief sign an anti-pollution petition, unknowingly convinces the Chief to sign the land away. Tipton sadly announces that the camp must close. Nurse St. Cloud confronts Ernest, who stammers that he will fix the situation.

Ernest and the Second Chancers storm onto the construction site and demand to see the boss. Krader is not present, but the foreman, Bronk is. Ernest tries to fight him, but Bronk brutally beats him up. The Second Chancers give up on Ernest and leave him. Later, Nurse St. Cloud overhears the kids demeaning Ernest's effort, so she reveals to them that Ernest is the only person who has defended them. They resolve to find him and apologize. From there, the group forms a plan to stop Krader and his construction crew.

Krader is prepared to demolish Kikakee, and while the regular staff and campers are sent home, Ernest and the Second Chancers openly attack the construction site to stall for time. They are joined by Chief St. Cloud, chefs Jake and Eddie, along with Pennington and Brooks, putting aside their rivalries. The group improvises some explosive weapons. Chief St. Cloud arrives to bless the fighters, although Nurse St. Cloud begs them not to go through with it. The assault quickly cripples the construction site's equipment. However, Bronk escapes in a bulldozer and destroys several camp buildings. The group stops him with Ernest's motorized maintenance cart filled with explosives. Ernest then knocks out Bronk.

Krader arrives on the scene with his lawyer, and then targets Ernest with his hunting rifle. Echoing Kikakee's ancient initiation pow wow, Ernest faces down Krader, and apparently passes the test as Krader takes three shots at him, missing every time. Ernest then plugs Krader's rifle with his finger and laughs in his face, signaling Krader's defeat. As Krader retreats, Nurse St. Cloud returns with a restraining order against the demolition.

Kamp Kikakee is once again operational, with all the campers and a full staff on site, with the last-chance kids getting to stay at camp. Nurse St. Cloud thanks Ernest for all he has done and reveals that Krader was ultimately arrested for fraud. Ernest is now a full-fledged counselor and also continues to perform his regular duties. As Ernest tries to rebuild the Kamp Kikakee sign, he accidentally falls and then the sign falls on him.

== Cast ==
- Jim Varney as Ernest P. Worrell
- Victoria Racimo as Nurse St. Cloud
- John Vernon as Sherman Krader
- Iron Eyes Cody as Old Indian Chief
- Lyle Alzado as Bronk Stinson, Krader's foreman
- Gailard Sartain as Jake
- Daniel Butler as Eddy
- Patrick Day as Bobby Wayne
- Scott Menville as Crutchfield
- Jacob Vargas as Bubba Vargas
- Danny Capri as Danny
- Hakim Abdulsamad as Moustafa-Hakeem Jones
- Todd Loyd as Chip Ozgood
- Richard Speight, Jr. as Brooks
- Andrew Woodworth as Pennington
- Eddy Schumacher as Councillor Stennis
- Larry Black as Head Councillor Tipton

== Production ==
The inception for the film came about when then Disney CEO Michael Eisner and executive Jeffrey Katzenberg were attending the Indianapolis 500 and were impressed with the reception that Jim Varney as Ernest P. Worrell had over Mickey Mouse during a parade. They set up a meeting with John R. Cherry III and Coke Sams to discuss producing a feature film. The duo had already made Dr. Otto and the Riddle of the Gloom Beam, where Ernest only made a cameo, but were happy to accept working with a bigger studio that had Ernest front and center. The plot of Ernest being a handyman at a camp was chosen to keep the budget small.

Varney was reluctant to make the film for fear of being typecast. Despite him going on benders leading up to production, he maintained a professional and cordial attitude on set. Much of Varney's dialogue was improvised, which Disney was reportedly frustrated with. A romance between Ernest and Nurse St. Cloud (Victoria Racimo) was cut because Disney didn't find it suitable.

Principal photography took place in Tennessee from September 3 until September 24, 1986. About 150 local Boy Scouts were hired as extras.

== Release ==
Ernest Goes to Camp was released theatrically in the United States by Buena Vista Pictures Distribution on May 22, 1987. It is the first film in the Ernest series, and the first in a four-film deal with Touchstone Pictures.

== Reception ==
=== Critical response ===
On the review aggregator website Rotten Tomatoes, 62% of 13 critics' reviews are positive, with an average rating of 5.4/10. Metacritic, which uses a weighted average, assigned the film a score of 24 out of 100, based on 5 critics, indicating "generally unfavorable" reviews.

=== Box office ===
Ernest Goes to Camp grossed $6.2 million in 1,541 theaters its opening weekend. By its second week, it had made $3.6 million. It went on to gross a total of $23.5 million. It is the third highest grossing Ernest film, after Ernest Saves Christmas ($28.2 million) and Ernest Goes to Jail ($25 million).

=== Accolades ===
Varney was nominated for the Golden Raspberry Award for Worst New Star at the 8th Golden Raspberry Awards.

== Home media ==
Originally released on VHS in 1987, with a re-issue in 1991 and a pan-and-scan LaserDisc release in 1992; this film's first DVD release was on September 3, 2002, from Touchstone Home Entertainment. Mill Creek Entertainment re-released it on January 18, 2011, as part of the two-disc set Ernest Triple Feature along with Ernest Goes to Jail and Ernest Scared Stupid. The Blu-ray was released on March 29, 2011, in a single disc Double Feature set along with Ernest Goes to Jail, and later on its own Blu-ray on June 13, 2011. A second Blu-ray double feature with Camp Nowhere was released on March 26, 2013.
