= Bill Byrge =

American character actor and comedian (1938–2025)

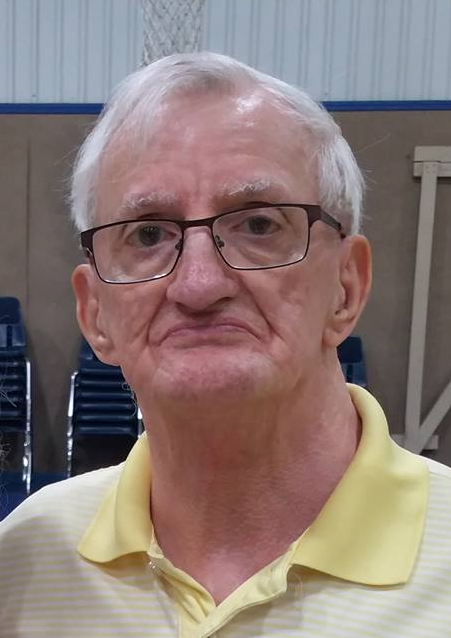
- Byrge in 2023
- Born: William Bill Byrge; September 8, 1938; Campbell County, Tennessee, U.S.
- Died: January 9, 2025 (aged 86); Nashville, Tennessee, U.S.
- Occupations: Actor; comedian; mailman; librarian
- Years active: 1985–2010
- Notable work: Bobby in the Ernest franchise

William Bill Byrge (September 8, 1938 – January 9, 2025) was an American character actor and comedian, best known for his work as Bobby in various Ernest P. Worrell projects.

== Early life ==
Bill was born in Campbell County, Tennessee, to Martha Bunch. Being born during the Great Depression meant limited food and as a child he was diagnosed with rickets due to a lack of a well-rounded diet. Byrge resided in Nashville. He famously never drove a car, as living downtown, everything was within walking distance, and because of his sentiments that people of Tennessee do not know how to drive.

== Career ==
In 1986, Byrge began appearing alongside Gailard Sartain in a series of "Me and My Brother Bobby" commercials, produced by the Nashville advertising company Carden and Cherry, the same company responsible for the Ernest P. Worrell commercials with Jim Varney. Basic premise was Sartain and Byrge were, "Twin brothers who didn't look anything alike", while the shtick was loud-mouth Chuck (Sartain) would endorse a certain product, and in some cases, would bungle something in the process, while his quiet and collected twin brother Bobby (Byrge) would mostly agree with whatever Chuck's sentiments were with a simple, yet enthusiastic nod.

Later in 1988, the actors would reprise their roles in their own recurring sketches on the Saturday morning children's show, Hey Vern, It's Ernest!, where, depending on the episode's specific theme, the brothers would usually get involved with whatever situation that Ernest was involving himself in, such as a bake sale or a talent show, for example. Later still, the characters were also featured in a number of the theatrical Ernest movies, in a variety of odd jobs, such as Eastern Airlines cargo attendants in Ernest Saves Christmas and security guards in Ernest Goes to Jail; it is also revealed in the Ernest movies that Chuck and Bobby are Ernest's next-door neighbors. Afterwards, Sartain was absent from remaining Ernest films, but Byrge continued to portray Bobby, and was paired with somewhat similar characters, including a younger brother Tom (Dallas native John Cadenhead) in Ernest Scared Stupid, and alongside Linda Kash's character Gerta in Ernest Goes to School which was filmed in Vancouver, British Columbia. In the original commercials and Ernest TV series, Bobby never speaks, but will occasionally mouth what he is trying to say, or even hold up a sign with his thoughts written on it; in the following Ernest movies however, Bobby actually did speak, sometimes only a line or two.

=== Post-Ernest ===
Byrge did little acting since the demise of the Ernest franchise; however, in later years, he did reprise his role as Bobby once again for an independent DVD movie, alongside Billy Dee (who also is the webmaster of the official Ernest/Jim Varney fansite), entitled Billy and Bobby the Wacky Duo On Vacation. In the movie, buddies Billy and Bobby go on roadtrip, but before they do, Billy needs to teach Bobby how to drive (which reflects Byrge's real-life lack of driving skills); Bobby also had a lot of dialogue in the movie as well. Byrge was also involved in a number of music videos and theater productions in his hometown of Nashville.

== Death ==
Byrge died at his home in Nashville, Tennessee on January 9, 2025, at age 86.

== Filmography ==
Year	Title	Role	Notes
1985	Dr. Otto and the Riddle of the Gloom Beam	Gas Station Attendant	
1988	Ernest Saves Christmas	Bobby	
1988	Hey Vern, It's Ernest!	Bobby	
1990	Ernest Goes to Jail	Bobby	
1991	Ernest Scared Stupid	Bobby	
1994	Ernest Goes to School	Bobby	
