= 100 Proof (film) =

- Directed by: Jeremy Horton
- Written by: Jeremy Horton
- Produced by: Jay Faires; George Maranville
- Starring: Pamela Stewart; Tara Bellando; J. S. Johnson; Minnie Bates Yancy; Jim Varney
- Cinematography: Harold Jarboe
- Edited by: George Maranville
- Music by: Michael Mossier
- Release date: 1997
- Running time: 94 minutes
- Country: United States
- Language: English

100 Proof is a 1997 American independent Southern Gothic thriller film written and directed by Jeremy Horton.^{[a]} Shot on location in Kentucky, it is based on the true story of a killing spree that took place in Lexington in 1986. Two women, LaFonda Fay Foster and Tina Hickey Powell, murdered five people in the real-life incident. The film's supporting cast includes Jim Varney, who portrays the drunk, violent, incestuous father of one of the two women at the center of the story. Varney's role is radically different from the humorous Ernest P. Worrell character for which he was best known.

== Plot ==
Close friends Rae and Carla live an impoverished life in a quiet, depressed Southern town. They pay for their drug and alcohol habits through odd jobs, grifting, and occasional prostitution. Rae has a disturbing encounter with her abusive, alcoholic father at a local bar. The two friends then head out to the countryside to score some cocaine and a brutal cycle of violence ensues.

== Cast ==
- Pamela Stewart as Rae
- Tara Bellando as Carla
- Jack Stubblefield Johnson as Arco
- Minnie Bates Yancy as Sissy
- Larry Brown as Eddie
- Kevin Hardesty as Roger
- Jim Varney as Rae's Father
- Loren Crawford as Trudy
- Joe Ventura as Ted
- Warren Ray as Tommy
- Jeff Lycan as R.T.
- Bobby Simmons as Toby
- Peter Smith as Fryman
- Buck Finley as Chester
- Joe Gatton as Owen

== Reception ==
The film premiered at the Sundance Film Festival in January 1997 and was released commercially that September. Variety reviewer Joe Leydon applauded the acting—particularly that of Stewart and Varney—and called the film a "diamond in the rough, or at least a shiny bit of jagged rhinestone." Stephen Holden of The New York Times praised the film's "integrity" and authentic depiction of poverty and violence, but found it difficult to take: "The film's crudeness works in its favor ... [it] has the look, texture and loose-jointedness of a semi-improvised home movie. Nothing is really explained. You are just plunked into the middle of this infinitely sullen slice of life. It isn't long before the characters' boredom and accumulated hostility begin to seep into you. But beyond an appalled sense of pity, it is impossible to feel much for them. You just want to get out of there as quickly as possible."

Ken Fox of TV Guide viewed it as both "grueling" and admirable: "The film attains the dirty, hyperrealism of a reality based cop show, but with a surprising touch of quiet compassion. ... In the end, the violence isn't cleansing, redemptive or empowering; it's just pitiful and very nasty."

== Notes ==
- Credits are per Screen World 1998 (1999) by John Willis and Barry Monush, p. 170. New York: Applause. ISBN 1-55783-342-7.
