= Roland W. Betts =

American film producer

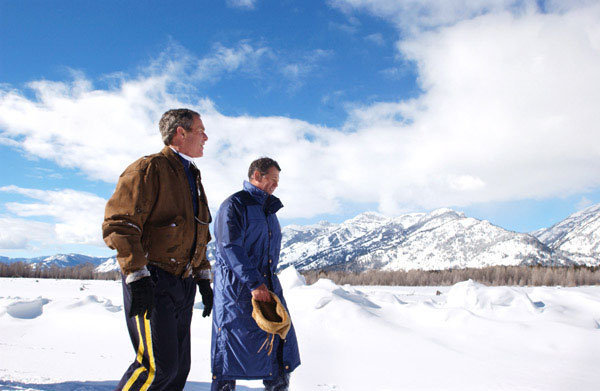
Roland Betts (right) with US President George W. Bush in Jackson Hole, Wyoming, February 9, 2002

Roland Whitney Betts (born May 25, 1946) is an American investor, film producer, developer, and owner of Chelsea Piers in New York City. A classmate and Delta Kappa Epsilon (DKE) fraternity brother of George W. Bush, Betts was the lead owner in Bush's Texas Rangers partnership. He is a graduate of St. Paul's School ('64), Yale ('68) and Columbia Law School ('78).

Roland and Lois Betts celebrated their 40th wedding anniversary in 2012. They have two daughters, Maggie and Jessica.

== Life and career ==
Betts was born in Laurel Hollow, Long Island, the son of an investment banker for the Vincent Astor Foundation. He grew up in Syosset, Long Island.

In 1968, after graduating from Yale, Betts worked as a teacher and assistant principal until 1975. In 1978, Betts wrote Acting Out: Coping with Big City Schools, a book which explores his experiences in the public school system. After graduating from Columbia Law School in 1978, he practiced law in the entertainment department at Paul, Weiss, Rifkind, Wharton & Garrison until leaving to finance movies. In 1980, he was named the President of International Film Investors, Inc., which produced and financed movies like Gandhi and The Killing Fields. In 1983, he founded Silver Screen Management, Inc. (see Silver Screen Partners) with Tom Bernstein, which financed and produced over 75 films with the Walt Disney Company, including Pretty Woman, The Rocketeer, and Three Men and a Baby.

The Texas Rangers were purchased in 1989 by a group of investors assembled by Roland W. Betts and George W. Bush. For nine years, Betts was lead owner of the Texas Rangers Baseball Club. Since 1992, Roland W. Betts is Founder and Chairman of Chelsea Piers Inc. which developed and operates the Chelsea Piers Sports and Entertainment complex.

Betts was the Senior Fellow of the Yale Corporation, an advisory board member of Yale School of Management, and is a Trustee of numerous organizations including: the American Museum of Natural History, Memorial Sloan-Kettering Cancer Center, Columbia University Law School, and the National Park Foundation. Mr. Betts has recently been appointed as a Trustee and Treasurer of the John F. Kennedy Center for the Performing Arts.

From 2001 to 2006, Betts was one of George Pataki's appointments to the Board of the Lower Manhattan Development Corporation. In that capacity, Mr. Betts chaired the Site Committee charged with the rebuilding of the World Trade Center site.

Roland W. Betts was also a heavy contributor to the Bush election campaign in 2000, helping raise more than $100,000 to that campaign, also putting down about $50,000 for the Bush Inauguration celebration. Bush has been seen visiting the Betts' at their vacation homes in Jackson Hole and Santa Fe.
