= Pop! Goes the Country =

- Genre: Musical variety
- Starring: Ralph Emery; Tom T. Hall; Jim Varney
- Country of origin: United States
- Original language: English

Production
- Production locations: Nashville, Tennessee, U.S.
- Running time: approx. 22-26 minutes
- Production companies: Show Biz, Inc.

Original release
- Network: Syndication
- Release: September 7, 1974 – January 1, 1982

Pop! Goes the Country is a weekly half-hour syndicated variety country music television series that originally aired from September 7, 1974, through 1982 for a total of 234 episodes. Originally hosted by Ralph Emery, the series was recorded at the Grand Ole Opry House and featured performances by and interviews with country music singers, both established celebrities and up and coming singers and musicians. In 1980, Tom T. Hall replaced Emery as the host. The comic actor Jim Varney joined the cast in the final season, as the show retooled as a "country music club", with Varney acting in comedy sketches featuring Tom T. Hall and the show's musical guests. The show also moved from the Opry House to Opryland USA's Gaslight Theater. It is also considered as a spin-off of The Porter Wagoner Show. The Statler Brothers sang the show's original theme song.

The series' title referenced the influence pop music was having on country music at the time on artists such as Barbara Mandrell, Lynn Anderson, Dolly Parton, The Oak Ridge Boys, Ronnie Milsap, and Anne Murray, all of whom appeared as guests on the program, although performers with more traditional styles such as Loretta Lynn, Merle Haggard, and Mel Tillis were also featured during the show's run.

As of December 2014, the show is being rebroadcast on the cable network RFD-TV.
