= Ernest Rides Again =

1993 film by John Cherry

- Theatrical release poster
- Directed by: John Cherry
- Screenplay by: John Cherry; William M. Akers
- Produced by: Stacy Williams
- Starring: Jim Varney; Ron K. James; Duke Ernsberger; Jeffrey Pillars
- Cinematography: David Geddes
- Edited by: Craig Bassett
- Music by: Bruce Arntson; Kirby Shelstad
- Production company: Emshell Producers
- Distributed by: Emshell Producers Group, Inc.
- Release date: November 12, 1993
- Running time: 94 minutes
- Country: United States
- Language: English
- Budget: $3 million
- Box office: $1.4 million

Ernest Rides Again is a 1993 American comedy film written and directed by John Cherry. It stars Jim Varney, Ron K. James, Linda Kash and Tom Butler . It is the sixth film to feature the character Ernest P. Worrell and the fifth film in the Ernest series, after Ernest Scared Stupid (1991). The plot follows Ernest and a history professor as they discover a long-lost Revolutionary War cannon and must protect it from others who want the precious jewels hidden inside.

It was released on November 11, 1993. It grossed $1.4 million and was the last in the series to be theatrically released. The next film in the series, Ernest Goes to School, was released in June 1994.

== Plot ==
Ernest P. Worrell is working as a janitor at a local college, and discovers an antique metal plate near a construction site. Ernest shows it to Dr. Abner Melon, a university professor who believes that it came from a giant Revolutionary War cannon called "Goliath". Dr. Abner Melon had previously been ridiculed by his peers for theorizing that the real Crown Jewels of England were stolen during the Revolutionary War and were actually hidden inside the long-lost cannon.

They begin to search for the artifact near the construction site and eventually locate it inside an abandoned mine. They are ambushed by historical antiquity collector and Dr. Abner Melon's colleague Dr. Radnor T. Glencliff whom they then lead on a harrowing chase through the countryside. Things become more complicated for them when British authorities hear about the incident and send a team of secret agents after them to retrieve the jewels. Dr. Abner Melon's wife, Nan, on the other hand is only after him and Ernest for the jewels. While everyone is hot on their trail, Ernest develops a deep friendship with Dr. Abner Melon. After crashing the cannon into a forest, Ernest locates the jewels, not in its barrel as the legend describes but in the gunpowder kegs. After putting the crown on his head, he finds himself unable to get it off. Dr. Radnor T. Glencliff shows up, abducts him, and takes him to his clinic in an attempt to surgically remove it and kill him at the same time. Dr. Abner Melon meets up with Nan and convinces her that Ernest changed his life.

While at the clinic, Ernest manages to escape from the surgery room and lead Dr. Radnor T. Glencliff on a chase through the building. When he has nowhere else to hide, he and Dr. Radnor T. Glencliff have one last fight to get the crown before Dr. Abner Melon arrives. At the last minute, Dr. Radnor T. Glencliff takes an axe off of the wall and attempts to behead Ernest. Just as he is moments away from death, Dr. Abner Melon bursts through the door and hits Dr. Radnor T. Glencliff over the head with the same antique metal plate Ernest found, knocking him out. Ernest realizes that Dr. Abner Melon has saved his life and they both realize that they have gone from being acquaintances to friends. At the same time, British authorities arrive and explain to Ernest that the crown must be taken back to its rightful home. He explains that it will not come off his head and the authorities declare that whoever wears it is King of England. Dr. Abner Melon removes it for him by tricking him about what is on his shirt, flicking him in the face. It causes it to fall off his head.

== Cast ==
- Jim Varney as Ernest P. Worrell
- Ron K. James as Abner, a history professor and Ernest's friend
- Tom Butler as Glencliff, a private artifact collector and surgeon on the board of the university
- Linda Kash as Nan, Abner's wife
- Duke Ernsberger as Frank
- Jeff Pillars as Joe
- Dave "Squatch" Ward as construction worker
- Alf Humphreys as surgeon
- Russell Roberts as suits commander
- Frank C. Turner as Van Driver
- Alex Diakun as Librarian

== Release ==
Ernest Rides Again was theatrically released in the United States on November 12, 1993. It was the first to be independently financed and released through John Cherry's company, Emshell Producers, after Touchstone Pictures and Buena Vista Pictures opted not to renew their deal. It was the last to be released theatrically as all future films would be released direct-to-video.

== Reception ==
=== Critical response ===
On the review aggregator website Rotten Tomatoes, 14% of 7 critics' reviews are positive, with an average rating of 3.8/10. Metacritic, which uses a weighted average, assigned the film a score of 28 out of 100, based on 11 critics, indicating "generally unfavorable" reviews.

=== Box office ===
The film opened to $905,010 in 1,190 theaters and grossed $1.4 million, making it the lowest grossing film in the Ernest series.
