= Orlando Science Center =

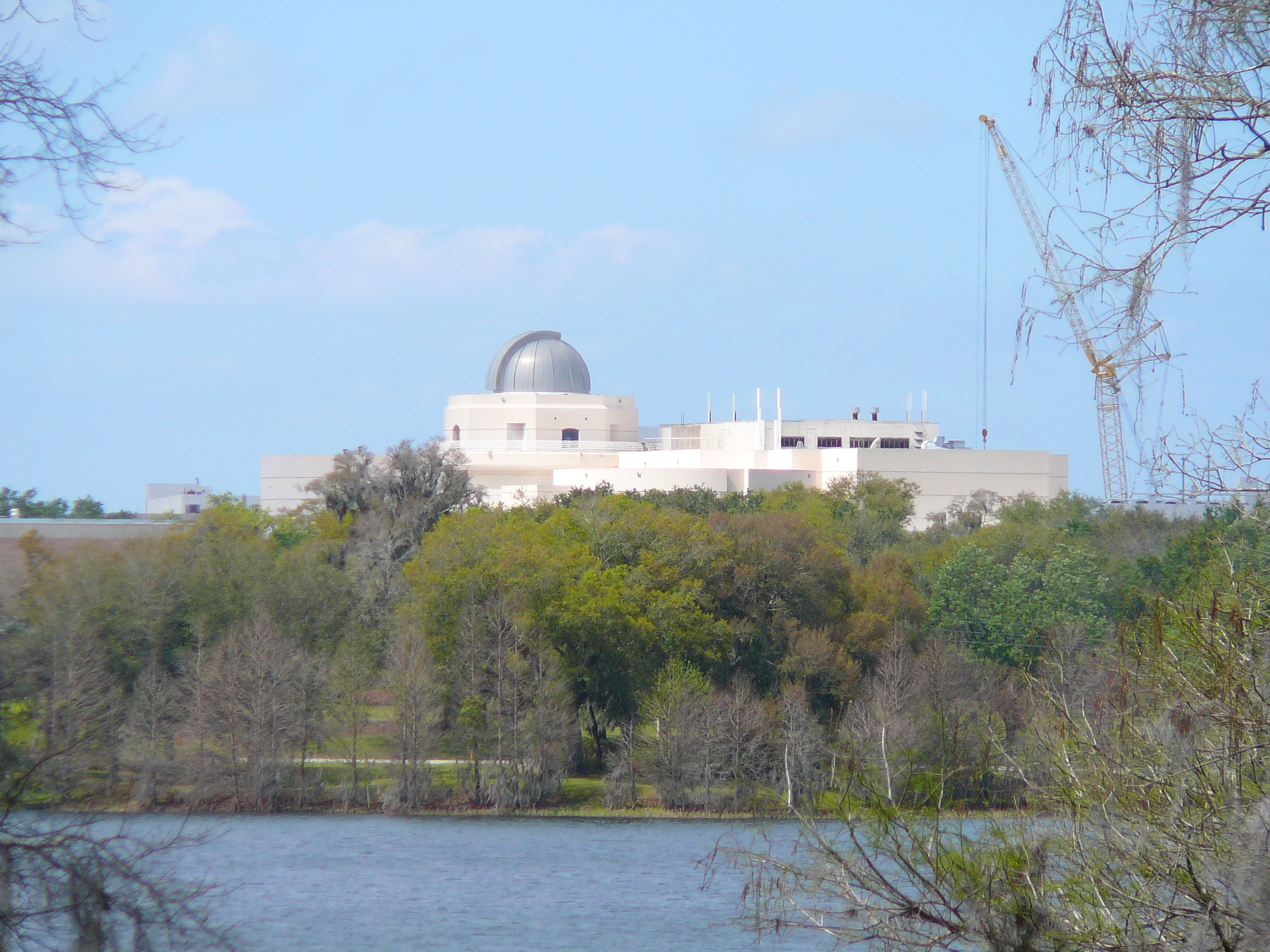
- The Orlando Science Center as seen from Harry P. Leu Gardens

- Location within Florida
- Established: 1955
- Location: Orlando, Florida
- Coordinates: 28.572321°N 81.368394°W
- Type: Science museum
- Visitors: +500,000 annually
- Director: JoAnn Newman
- Public transit access: 125
- Website: www.osc.org

The Orlando Science Center (OSC) is a private science museum located in Orlando, Florida. Its purposes are to provide experience-based opportunities for learning about science and technology and to promote public understanding of science.

The Orlando Science Center is accredited by the American Alliance of Museums (AAM) and is a member of the Association of Science-Technology Centers (ASTC). The Orlando Science Center is member supported and sponsored in part by United Arts of Central Florida, Inc., the State of Florida, Department of State, Division of Cultural Affairs, and the Florida Arts Council.

== History ==
Incorporated in 1955, the Central Florida Museum (CFM) opened in Orlando Loch Haven Park in 1960. For its first decade, it was an anthropology museum with collections of artifacts relating to Florida and the Caribbean Basin.

In the early 1970s, the CFM's board of directors voted to change directions and become a "hands-on" science and technology center. In 1973 the institution was renamed to honor a famous native son and astronaut, John Young.

In 1984, as part of an expansion and change of philosophy, the institution's name was changed to Orlando Science Center. In 1985 another major expansion created a permanent physical sciences hall, a traveling exhibit hall, and Curiosity Corner, a hands-on exhibit area dedicated to pre-school and early primary-age children. Its new facility was the setting for the Orlando Children's Museum scenes in Ernest Saves Christmas. During the final expansion to the original facility in 1990, NatureWorks, a prototype for OSC's centerpiece natural science exhibit was created.

In May 1992, the Board and staff developed a comprehensive master plan for the Orlando Science Center, including a blueprint for construction of an entirely new science center. Construction of the new science center began in early 1995.

The new 207,000 sq ft (19,200 m^{2}) Orlando Science Center celebrated its grand opening on February 1, 1997. It is six times larger than the original facility, which closed on December 31, 1996. The current president and CEO of the science center is JoAnn Newman.

== Exhibits ==
These are the current exhibits within the Orlando Science Center

- NatureWorks - 1st Floor - Exhibit hall that describes the richness of the natural world, with a focus on the diverse ecosystems of Central Florida. Such as, plants and animals of coral reefs, cypress swamps, mangrove, and other Florida environments. You can learn how living and non-living things interact with each other and their environment.
- KidsTown - 2nd Floor - Miniature town that introduces science concepts through whole-body experiences, hands-on interactives and imaginative role-playing.
- Kinetic Zone - 2nd Floor - An eclectic array of hands-on, interactive exhibits, Kinetic Zone lets visitors explore the fundamentals of forces, such as electricity, gravity, Newton's Laws and much more. Visitors can engage in a series of hands-on challenges that invite them to design, build and test their own.
- The Hive: A Makerspace - 3rd Floor - A collaborative workspace for making, learning, exploring, and sharing. The Hive is a space that cultivates community and emphasizes learning opportunities in every failure and success.
- Fusion: A STEAM Gallery – 3rd Floor Mezzanine - The Orlando Science Center's art gallery which integrates art into the STEM curriculum. All art displayed has a fusion of art and technology. While the Gallery will remain as a permanent part of the Science Center, the exhibition is updated intermittently
- DinoDigs - 4th Floor - Exhibit consisting of fossil replicas of dinosaurs and prehistoric sea creatures. Uncover fossils in the giant dig pit "Jurassic Ridge"; examine real, fossilized dinosaur eggs; explore displays that feature ancient land and marine reptiles; compare reptiles and dinosaurs to see similarities and differences; and discover denizens of the ancient oceans such as Elasmosaurus and Tylosaurus. These casts were originally displayed at Disney's Animal Kingdom as part of the Dinosaur Jubilee at DinoLand U.S.A.
- Our Planet - 4th Floor - This exhibit is geared to exploring the strange, curious and odd peculiarities of the universe and humanities place within it. Discover the dynamic forces and systems that shape Earth and uncover the mysteries of the Solar System. Experiences include computer-based interactives and visuals, such as images direct from the NASA Hubble Space Telescope, and hands-on stations that explore some strange and familiar phenomena. There is also a Virtusphere: a 10-foot hollow sphere that rotate freely in any direction based to the user's steps.
- Observatory - 6th Floor - Florida's largest public refractor telescope as well as an array of smaller yet still powerful telescopes strategically placed for star gazing. The Crosby Observatory is open from 3–5pm for SunWatch on the first Saturday of each month, weather permitting, and from 5–9 on the first and third Saturday of the month, weather permitting (exhibit halls are closed during this time).

== Traveling exhibits ==
The Science Center has a history of hosting traveling exhibits that are displayed for a few months at a time in different galleries.

== Theaters ==
The Science Center has two movie theaters that show both educational and Hollywood films as well as laser light shows. Check the Orlando Science Center website for a current list of movie show times.

- Dr. Phillips CineDome - Featuring a giant screen measuring 8,000 square feet, the 300-seat Dr. Phillips CineDome projects films through a fisheye lens, creating an image that surrounds the audience and extends well beyond their peripheral vision. It uses the largest film format in the world, 10 times larger than a conventional film theater. It is commonly called 15/70, meaning 15 perforations (horizontally) on a 70 mm print.
- Digital Adventure Theater - One of the first museums to join a national effort with National Geographic, the Science Center has special access to one of the world's largest giant-screen film libraries that includes award-winning films in 2D and 3D digital formats. In addition, this theater also shows select Hollywood movies and Science Live! programs such as Kaboom! and High Voltage.

== Annual events ==
- Spark STEM Fest - Formerly known as 'Otronicon,' this four-day event lets guests experience, interact, and learn with STEM industry leaders and educators, experience the future of games and design, see the latest in medical and military technologies, check out workshops and panels led by industry pros, and look at art from a new and exciting angle with the fusion of art and technology.
- Science Night Live - Grown-up inspired programming including Science Trivia, experiments, 3D films, special presentations, laser light, stars and planets viewing through the giant refractor telescope in the Crosby Observatory. From the event's inception on February 20, 2016 until May 31, 2025, only people aged 21 or older were allowed to attend the event until the age restriction was lowered to 18 starting with the August 23, 2025 event.
- Science & Wine - Presentations on multiple aspects of wine growing and tasting as well as the opportunity to sample fine wines from the world's major regions. Includes live music, a silent auction, and a formal wine seminar.

== Facility rentals ==
The Orlando Science Center offers its facility to host meetings, special engagements, and weddings. The venue offers 50,000 square feet (4,600 m^{2}) of exhibits, a private theater, and IWerks movies.

== See also ==
- List of science centers
