= Shane Keister =

American musician

Shane Keister is an American musician. He is known for his work as a studio musician, writer, arranger and producer. He plays synthesizer, piano, Hammond B3, Synclavier, Fairlight CMI, Fender Rhodes, and others.

== History ==
Keister was born in Huntington, West Virginia and grew up in the small southern Ohio town of Portsmouth. He began playing the piano at the age of three. As a child and teenager, he studied piano under Dorothy Knost. In junior high school, he studied percussion and jazz under Ralph Harrison. In High School, Shane was accompanist for the Portsmouth High School Choir under the direction of Charles P. Varney. He was a contemporary and fellow music student with Kathleen Battle, although he was a few years younger than Ms Battle. Already a technically skilled classical pianist, as early as junior high school he began playing with local rock and roll bands and performing in clubs and local venues. He was one of the first local keyboardists to own and use a Leslie Speaker Cabinet. The bands Keister played in were quite popular and were very busy in the local rock scene. He moved back to Huntington, West Virginia in his senior year of high school where he continued his piano studies with Mary Shepp Mann. He attended Marshall University his freshman year and transferred his college studies to North Texas State University for one more year. Keister moved to Nashville in 1972 and quickly established himself as a very capable and well-rounded studio musician. His career flourished and in the late 80's, he composed and produced the musical scores for Dr. Otto and the Riddle of the Gloom Beam and Ernest Goes to Camp.

At the request of the late Ahmet Ertegün, Keister moved to New York in 1989 to work for him as a staff producer/arranger at Atlantic Records. Keister and Ahmet Ertegun produced the Diane Schuur Music Is My Life album together. Keister worked extensively with Ertegun until 2000 when he decided to again pursue his career independently.

Keister continues to do studio work today, as a pianist/synthesist and as a producer/arranger. He owns an extensive list of vintage synthesizers, including a Fairlight CMI 2x, a Synclavier, a PPG Wave 2.3, a Memorymoog, and an Oberheim Matrix-12 synthesizers among many others. His work on records is extensive and constantly expanding.

He won a Dove Award for "Instrumental Album of the Year" — along with Michael Omartian, Dann Huff, Tommy Sims, Tom Hemby, Terry McMillan, Chris Rodriguez, Mark Douthit, and Eric Darken — for the album The Players in 1997.

Shane co-produced and arranged Don Francisco's 1977 album "Forgiven" with John W. Thompson. In addition to working as produced and arranger, Shane also contributed acoustic piano, electric piano, and synthesizers to the album. He also produced and played keyboards and synthesizers (Prophet 5, ARP, and others) on the Don Francisco albums "Got To Tell Somebody" (1979) and "The Traveler" (1981).

He has worked with a long list of musicians over the years, including Elvis Presley, Billy Joel, Amy Grant, Michael W Smith and Lou Marini.

== Personal life ==
Shane married Alice Dawkins after meeting in Dallas TX. (1970). They moved to Nashville and had two boys. Aaron (1972) and Samuel (1982). They divorced in 1985.
