= Knowhutimean? Hey Vern, It's My Family Album =

Direct-to-video film starring Jim Varney

- Directed by: John R. Cherry III
- Written by: John R. Cherry III; Jim Varney
- Produced by: John R. Cherry III; Coke Sams
- Starring: Jim Varney; Charlie Lamb
- Cinematography: Jim May
- Edited by: Pamela Scott Arnold
- Release date: 1985
- Running time: 57 minutes
- Country: United States
- Language: English

Knowhutimean? Hey Vern, It's My Family Album is an anthology of comedic short subjects directed by John R. Cherry III, and released direct-to-video in 1985. It was filmed in Nashville, Tennessee. As a whole, it is the first film to feature the advertising character Ernest P. Worrell, played by Jim Varney (who also portrays numerous other characters throughout the picture).

== Synopsis ==
The film is set up as a series of sketches featuring Jim Varney's various characters, some of which he introduced in his stand-up comedy routines: Corporal Davy, the frontiersman; Lieutenant Ace, the fighter pilot; Uncle Lloyd, the mean-spirited mountain man; Cousin Billy, the jive-talking carny; Rhetch, a reckless riverboat gambler; and Ernest's "Pa" and his companion Queequeg.

Ernest P. Worrell's appearances serve as a framing device, with the characters introduced as his relatives and the ever-insistent Ernest trying to tell the unwilling-as-usual Vern about the characters.

== Home media ==
This comedy short anthology had its first DVD release from Mill Creek Entertainment on October 31, 2006 as part of the DVD box sets Maximum Ernest and Essential Ernest Collection along with "Your World As I See It". Image Entertainment re-released it on June 5, 2012 as part of Ernest's Wacky Adventures: Volume 2 and on January 12, 2016 along with "Your World As I See It" as part of Ultimate Ernest Collection.
