= Convenient Food Mart =

US chain of convenience stores

- Company type: Private
- Industry: Retail (Convenience stores)
- Founded: Chicago, Illinois (1958; 68 years ago)
- Headquarters: Mentor, Ohio, U.S.
- Products: Grocery, soft drinks, prepared foods

Convenient Food Mart (CFM) is a chain of convenience stores in the United States. The private company's headquarters are located in Mentor, Ohio, and there are currently approximately 325 stores located in the US. Convenient Food Mart operates on the franchise system.

Convenient Food Mart was the nation's third-largest chain of convenience stores as of 1988. The NASDAQ exchange dropped Convenient Food Mart the same year when the company failed to meet financial reporting requirements.

Carden & Cherry advertised Convenient Food Mart with the Ernest character in the 1980s.
