= Slam Dunk Ernest =

1995 film by John Cherry

- Home video release poster
- Directed by: John Cherry
- Written by: John Cherry; Daniel Butler
- Produced by: George Horie; Stacy Williams
- Starring: Jim Varney; Cylk Cozart; Miguel A. Núñez Jr.; Jay Brazeau; Kareem Abdul-Jabbar
- Cinematography: David Geddes
- Edited by: Craig Bassett; Chris Ellis
- Music by: Mark Adler
- Production company: Emshell Producers
- Distributed by: Buena Vista Home Video (Note: Distributed under the Touchstone Home Video banner.)
- Release date: June 20, 1995
- Running time: 93 minutes
- Country: United States
- Language: English
- Budget: $3 million

Slam Dunk Ernest is a 1995 American sports comedy film. It is the eighth film to feature the character Ernest P. Worrell, and the seventh in the Ernest series, after Ernest Goes to School (1994). It was directed and written by John Cherry and stars Jim Varney. In the film, Ernest joins his employer's basketball team and later becomes a star with the help of an angel.

It was released on direct-to-video on June 20, 1995. The next film in the series, Ernest Goes to Africa was released in July 1997.

== Plot ==
Ernest takes a job with a cleaning service at the local mall, and he soon seeks to join his co-workers' basketball team, "Clean Sweep", as they compete in the city league tournament. He is reluctantly accepted by the team, but given only a minor role as their cheerleader and mascot. They start to regret letting Ernest join when he accidentally causes them to lose a game in the last second.

In his despair, he is visited by an angel, and given a pair of magical shoes, but is warned, "Don't misuse the shoes." As a matter of fact, the shoe store's owner, Zamiel Moloch happens to be a demon in disguise. He would eventually prevent Ernest's sportsmanship with the basketball players by luring Ernest to arrogance, and Ernest's love interest, Erma Terradiddle, a money-loving lady who was a formerly shy but cheerful geek turned into a beautiful but tawdry seductress, all in an effort to gain Quincy, the son of Barry, the team captain.

When an injury to a key player threatens to eliminate the team from the tournament unless they find a backup player, Ernest is given an opportunity to play. In the process, he discovers that the supernatural shoes have imbued him with super speed and the ability to fly. Armed with these extraordinary abilities, he leads the team to a series of victories leading ultimately to a showdown with the NBA's Charlotte Hornets. As the city league tournament champions, Clean Sweep earns the right to play an exhibition contest against the Hornets, but suffers turmoil as Ernest's teammates soon grow weary of his flagrant over-the-top ball-hogging antics. All the while, Quincy goes to steal a pair of tennis shoes he has had his eyes on.

While Ernest is in the zone and the team does nothing but sit around, Ernest decides to let the team do the work, wash his hands of Moloch and Erma, and get rid of the shoes. In doing so, it influences Quincy to return the shoes, but Ernest is needed again and scores the game-winning point and the members of the team get drafted into the NBA, after a real agent recognizes Barry's skill.

== Cast ==
- Jim Varney as Ernest P. Worrell
  - A.J. Bond as little Ernest
- Cylk Cozart as Barry
- Aaron Joseph as Quincy
- Kareem Abdul-Jabbar as the Archangel
- Miguel A. Núñez Jr. as T.J.
- Lester Barrie as Willie
- Colin Lawrence as Tommy T.
- Richard Leacock as Walter
- Jay Brazeau as Mr. Moloch
- Stevie Louise Vallance as Erma
- Myles Ferguson as Johnny

== Release ==
Originally released on VHS on June 20, 1995, a LaserDisc release was also planned for the same year, but later cancelled.

== See also ==
- List of basketball films
