= Ernest Saves Christmas =

1988 film by John Cherry

- Theatrical release poster
- Directed by: John Cherry
- Screenplay by: B. Kline; Ed Turner
- Story by: Ed Turner
- Produced by: Stacy Williams; Doug Claybourne
- Starring: Jim Varney
- Cinematography: Peter Stein
- Edited by: Ian D. Thomas
- Music by: Mark Snow
- Production companies: Touchstone Pictures; Silver Screen Partners III; Emshell Producers Group
- Distributed by: Buena Vista Pictures Distribution
- Release date: November 11, 1988
- Running time: 91 minutes
- Country: United States
- Language: English
- Budget: $6.5 million
- Box office: $28.2 million

Ernest Saves Christmas is a 1988 American Christmas comedy film directed by John Cherry from a screenplay by B. Kline and Ed Turner. It stars Jim Varney, Oliver Clark, Noelle Parker and Douglas Seale. It is the third film to feature the character Ernest P. Worrell and the second film in the Ernest series, after Ernest Goes to Camp (1987). The film chronicles Ernest's attempt to help find a replacement for an aging Santa Claus.

It was released on November 11, 1988. It grossed $28.2 million, making it the highest grossing film in the Ernest series. The next film in the series, Ernest Goes to Jail, was released in April 1990.

== Plot ==
A man claiming to be Santa Claus arrives in Orlando, Florida, where Ernest P. Worrell works as a taxicab driver. Santa informs Ernest that he is on his way to tell a local celebrity named Joe Carruthers that he has been chosen to be the new Santa Claus. Joe used to host a popular children's program that emphasized manners and integrity.

During their drive, a runaway teenage girl named Harmony Starr joins Ernest and Santa in the taxi. Upon reaching their destination, Santa realizes he has no real money and only possesses play money. Ernest lets him ride for free, resulting in Ernest losing his job. Ernest later discovers that Santa left his magic sack in the taxi and decides to find Santa and return it to him.

Santa tries to talk to Joe at the Orlando Children's Museum but is interrupted and dismissed by Joe's rude agent, Marty Brock. Santa becomes worried when he discovers his sack is missing and feels discouraged due to his increasing forgetfulness at the age of 151. Marty refuses to believe Santa's predicament and has him arrested.

To help Santa escape from jail, Ernest pretends to be an employee of the governor, and Harmony poses as the governor's niece. They convince the police chief to transfer Santa to a mental hospital. Santa explains to Ernest and Harmony that he became Santa Claus in 1889 and has enjoyed the role, but the magic weakens over time. To restore its full strength, he must pass the job on to someone else, which is why he needs to find Joe and make him the new Santa Claus before 7:00 PM.

Ernest disguises himself as a snake rancher to sneak Santa into a movie studio. Marty pressures Joe to abandon his focus on teaching goodness to children and instead take a role in a horror film called Christmas Slay, which deeply offends Santa. Santa punches the director in response.

Meanwhile, two holding dock workers receive crates marked for release to "Helper Elves". The workers argue over the shipping papers and the crates' contents, which are revealed to contain flying reindeer. They seek help from animal control, but the reindeer amaze them by walking on the warehouse ceiling.

Santa finally tracks down Joe at his home and explains the importance of the Santa Claus position. Joe initially declines but later changes his mind when he refuses to use foul language in front of the children on the film set. Ernest and Harmony discover the magic of Santa's sack, but Harmony, whose real name is Pamela Trenton, abuses it. She steals the sack but eventually returns it after her conscience prevails.

On Christmas Eve, Ernest and the helpers meet Santa's elves at the airport, retrieve the reindeer and sleigh, and fly to the children's museum. Although Ernest initially struggles to control the sleigh, they eventually make it to the museum. Joe witnesses the flying reindeer and sleigh, confirming Santa's claims. Joe turns down the acting job and decides to become the new Santa Claus.

Joe uses his magic to make it snow in Orlando. Ernest and the helpers arrive just in time, and Pamela decides to go home after calling her mother. Joe chooses Pamela as his special helper and promises to take her home after their journey. Ernest becomes the sleigh driver for the night. Santa resumes his identity as Seth Applegate and spends Christmas Eve with museum employee Mary Morrissey.

At 7:00 PM, Joe takes off to deliver gifts. Later the two dock workers receive a crate marked "E. Bunny".

== Cast ==
- Jim Varney as Ernest P. Worrell
- Douglas Seale as Santa Claus
- Oliver Clark as Joe Carruthers
- Noelle Parker as Harmony
- Gailard Sartain as Chuck
- Bill Byrge as Bobby
- Billie Bird as Mary Morrissey
- Robert Lesser as Marty
- Buddy Douglas as Pyramus
- Patty Maloney as Thisbe
- Lindsey Alley as Patsy

== Production ==
This was the first major feature production filmed almost entirely in Orlando, Florida, at the then-unfinished Disney-MGM Studios. Exterior scenes set at the house of Ernest's friend Vern were filmed at a house located on Residential Street at the park, and which was part of the Studio Backlot Tour until it was demolished in 2002.

The remainder of the scenes were filmed in various locations in the greater Orlando area, including Orlando International Airport, Epcot Center Drive, Lake Eola, Church Street Station and Orange Avenue in Downtown Orlando, a toll booth on the Bee Line Expressway (now known as the "Beachline Expressway"), the original Orlando Science Center which is now the John and Rita Lowndes Shakespeare Center (used as the "Orlando Children's Museum" in the film), and the Orlando AMTRAK station.

The Lake Mary studios of then-Fox affiliate WOFL-TV (channel 35, which is now owned by Fox itself) were used for the Christmas Slay film scenes, as the station already had a promotional relationship with Jim Varney and the Ernest character. Other smaller scenes were filmed in Nashville.

== Release ==
Ernest Saves Christmas was released theatrically in the United States by Buena Vista Pictures Distribution on November 11, 1988. It is the second film in the Ernest series, and the second in a four-film deal with Touchstone Pictures.

== Reception ==
=== Critical response ===
The film received poor reviews.

On the review aggregator website Rotten Tomatoes, 40% of 15 critics' reviews are positive, with an average rating of 5/10. Metacritic, which uses a weighted average, assigned the film a score of 44 out of 100, based on 7 critics, indicating "mixed or average" reviews.

=== Box office ===
In its opening weekend, Ernest Saves Christmas placed second at the box office behind Child's Play and grossed $5.7 million from 1,634 theaters. Its domestic total was $28.2 million, making it the highest grossing Ernest film.

== Home media ==
The DVD was released on September 3, 2002, from Touchstone Home Entertainment.

== See also ==
- List of Christmas films
