= Ernest Goes to Jail =

1990 film by John Cherry

- Theatrical release poster
- Directed by: John Cherry
- Written by: Charlie Cohen
- Produced by: Stacy Williams
- Starring: Jim Varney; Gailard Sartain
- Cinematography: Peter Stein
- Edited by: Sharyn L. Ross
- Music by: Bruce Arntson; Kirby Shelstad
- Production companies: Touchstone Pictures; Silver Screen Partners IV; Emshell Producers Group
- Distributed by: Buena Vista Pictures Distribution
- Release date: April 6, 1990
- Running time: 88 minutes
- Country: United States
- Language: English
- Budget: $9 million
- Box office: $25 million

Ernest Goes to Jail is a 1990 American comedy film directed by John Cherry and written by Charlie Cohen. It stars Jim Varney, Gailard Sartain, Barbara Bush, Charles Napier, Randall "Tex" Cobb, Bill Byrge, Barry Scott and Dan Leegant.

It is the fourth film to feature the character Ernest P. Worrell and the third film in the Ernest series, after Ernest Goes to Camp (1987) and Ernest Saves Christmas (1988). It was released on April 6, 1990. It grossed $25 million and was the second highest-grossing film in the series. The next film in the series, Ernest Scared Stupid, was released in October 1991.

== Plot ==
Ernest P. Worrell is employed as a night janitor at the Howard Country Bank & Trust where his friends and neighbors, Chuck and Bobby, work as security guards. While trying to use a floor polisher, Ernest makes an enormous mess that results in him being electrocuted with strange results. His body becomes magnetized and while trying to escape the various objects attracted to him, he goes into the vault but a pair of safe deposit boxes knock him out just as the effect wears off.

The next morning, co-worker Charlotte Sparrow, whom Ernest is smitten with, asks him out to “just dinner” to discuss Ernest's desire to move up and become a clerk. However, this goal is hampered by his knuckleheaded antics and the ire earned from bank president, Oscar Pendlesmythe. Meanwhile, at the Dracup State Penitentiary, convict Rubin Bartlett kills a fellow prisoner and seeks help from Felix Nash, a convicted bank robber and death row inmate. Unable to offer anything in return, Rubin goes on trial. At the same time, Ernest receives a summons to jury duty on the same trial. In the courtroom, Rubin notices Ernest has a striking resemblance to Nash. In league with Bartlett and Nash, the defendant's attorney makes a successful motion for the jury to see the scene of the crime so the switch can be made.

Nash and his silent yet hulking henchman, Lyle, make the switch. Nash coerces the jury to pardon Rubin while Ernest, unknowingly at first, takes Nash's place. Upon realizing his predicament, Ernest makes a series of unsuccessful attempts to escape the prison while also trying to keep up the ruse that he is Nash out of fear of reprisal. At the same time, Nash is planning to rob the bank but gets distracted trying to keep a suspicious Bobby and his smooth, un-Ernest like demeanor from exposing him.

In prison, Ernest is taken to be executed via the electric chair. Having given up on escaping and trying to convince the warden of his identity, Ernest makes a final speech and is electrocuted. The massive voltage puts him in a kind of trance and he becomes magnetized again — only this time, he can zap bolts of electricity from his fingers. He uses this power to comically subdue the guards and blast a hole in the main gate. Rubin attempts to stop him but Lyle, speaking up for the first time, steps in and knocks him out. He tells Ernest to flee so he can stop Nash and save his friends. He also rejects Ernest's request to come with him, saying his place is in the prison but that he will miss him. Ernest escapes, and after changing out of his prison uniform, races to the bank with his dog, Rimshot.

Nash has set up a bomb and handcuffed Chuck to the vault. Charlotte arrives, after an earlier encounter with Nash at Ernest's home that went bad, and is taken hostage as well. Just as Ernest arrives, so do the prison officials. Bobby appears and almost gains the upper hand over Nash but fails. An electrified security cage that Chuck and Bobby installed also fails as Ernest and Nash fight. Nash throws Ernest against the cage and is electrocuted yet again. This time, his body is electromagnetically polarized allowing him to levitate erratically. Ernest uses the floor polisher against Nash, dragging him up along the ceiling, resulting in him being dropped out cold.

With seconds left on the bomb's timer, Ernest heroically grabs it and flies up and out of the bank to a safe distance, but it explodes in the night sky. Chuck and Bobby are devastated that Ernest may have been killed but Nash recovers and holds the group at gunpoint. Before he can use Charlotte as a hostage again, Ernest's charred body lands on Nash and knocks him out again. Charred but alive, Ernest is hailed as a hero, while Nash is arrested.

== Cast ==
- Jim Varney as Ernest P. Worrell / Mr. Nash / Auntie Nelda
- Gailard Sartain as Chuck
- Bill Byrge as Bobby
- Barbara Bush as Charlotte Sparrow
- Barry Scott as Rubin Bartlett
- Randall "Tex" Cobb as Lyle
- Dan Leegant as Oscar Pendlesmythe
- Charles Napier as Warden
- Andrew Stahl as Jerry
- Jim Conrad as Eddie
- Bob Babbitt as washing con

== Production ==
Principal photography took place in Nashville from September 25 until November 15, 1989. A former manufacturing plant in Nashville was converted into a 100,000-square-foot studio by the production designer. This is where the sets were built for, Howard County Bank & Trust, two three-story jail cell tiers, an electrocution room, and Ernest's house. Scenes were shot at the Tennessee State Prison for three days.

== Release ==
Ernest Goes to Jail was released theatrically in the United States by Buena Vista Pictures Distribution on April 6, 1990. It is the third film in the Ernest series, and the third in a four-film deal with Touchstone Pictures.

== Reception ==
=== Critical response ===
On the review aggregator website Rotten Tomatoes, 11% of 9 critics' reviews are positive, with an average rating of 3.6/10. Metacritic, which uses a weighted average, assigned the film a score of 40 out of 100, based on 11 critics, indicating "mixed or average" reviews.

Caryn James of The New York Times commented that "Ernest Goes to Jail so resembles a high-spirited cartoon that it is likely to be more amusing to children and less painfully obnoxious for parents than its predecessors." She considered the film's heavy focus on slapstick humor and comedic interactions with inanimate objects to be the biggest improvement, saying that while the film is not particularly inventive with this sort of humor, it would appeal to its young target audience more. Writing for the Sun-Sentinel, Roger Hurlburt agreed that Ernest Goes to Jail is a major improvement over the first two Ernest films, due to Ernest's comic mishaps being tied into a solid storyline, but cautioned that it is still a highly uneven work. He elaborated that "Undeniably, Varney is an adroit physical comedian with a flair for making faces, contorting his lean body and evoking a sensation of the heebie-jeebies at appropriate moments.", resulting in a number of inventive laughs, but that in the more dialogue-heavy scenes the characters become dull. In contradiction to Hurlburt, Ty Burr of Entertainment Weekly said that the use of a full plotline in Ernest Goes to Jail makes it a worse film than the previous two Ernest installments, arguing that the Ernest character is best used in short gags and could never become a sympathetic hero. He gave the film a D.

=== Box office ===
The film debuted in third place during its opening weekend, earning $6.1 million. Its total gross was $25 million, making it the second highest grossing the Ernest series.

== Home media ==
Ernest Goes to Jail was released on LaserDisc and VHS in January 1991. Mill Creek Entertainment released the film on Blu-ray for the first time on March 29, 2011, in a single disc Double Feature set along with Ernest Goes to Camp.
