= Ernest Goes to School =

1994 film by Coke Sams

- Release poster
- Directed by: Coke Sams
- Screenplay by: Coke Sams; Bruce Arntson
- Produced by: Stacy Williams
- Starring: Jim Varney; Linda Kash; Bill Byrge
- Cinematography: David Geddes
- Edited by: Chris Ellis
- Music by: Bruce Arntson; Kirby Shelstad
- Production company: Emshell Producers
- Distributed by: Emshell Producers Group, Inc.
- Release date: June 10, 1994
- Running time: 89 minutes
- Country: United States
- Language: English
- Budget: $3 million

Ernest Goes to School is a 1994 American comedy film directed and co-written by Coke Sams. It stars Jim Varney, Linda Kash and Bill Byrge. It is the seventh film to feature the character Ernest P. Worrell, and the sixth film in the Ernest series, after Ernest Rides Again (1993). It is the only Ernest film to not be directed by John Cherry and the first to not have a wide theatrical release.

The film received a limited theatrical release in Cincinnati, Ohio beginning on June 10, 1994. It was released on direct-to-video on December 14, 1994. The next film in the series, Slam Dunk Ernest was released in June 1995.

== Plot ==
Ernest works as a janitor at Chickasaw Falls High School, which is facing closure due to the school board's decision to merge other schools in the area. A new rule requires employees to have a high school diploma, which Ernest lacks due to an incomplete high school transcript. Ernest has two choices as a result: Resign or go through the twelfth grade. Ernest reluctantly decides to enter the student body, attending regular classes and partaking in student activities.

After Ernest struggles in school, the principal tells Ernest he may as well forget about the experiment. While Ernest sulks, two science teachers show up inside his locker to reveal their biggest experiment to him - a potential brain accelerator, and decide to make Ernest their "Human Guinea Pig". The experiment is successful and Ernest becomes significantly smart, proving to be extremely proficient at virtually everything from mathematics to drama to music. The only downside is that his personality turns snobbish and superior, alienating him from his friends. Ernest's love interest, Ms. Flugal, makes him band conductor and puts him in charge of directing the marching band during the halftime show at an upcoming football game.

Eventually, two bullies discover Ernest's secret when they see him descend into his locker to recharge his intelligence. The bullies destroy the accelerator right before the night of the football game. The whole procession is ultimately ruined when Ernest realizes he cannot recharge and has to direct the band with his usual mind and intelligence. He gets his head stuck in a tuba and causes a series of catastrophic events during the halftime show. Depressed, Ernest starts packing his things, but his schoolmates force him to study for the final exam. On the day of the exam, the science teachers tell Ernest that the brain accelerator has been repaired. Feeling for his friends who labored with him while studying, Ernest declines to use the machine and takes the exam on his own.

Later, the football game finals for the district championship take place. During the game, the board inspector bribes the football coach to throw the game against the rival team by offering him a better coaching job at the newly merged Central High. As the head of the school board is in the audience, the forthcoming loss will likely convince the board the merger must happen. The coach accepts, resulting in the football team losing every play, though one of Ernest's friends overhears the scheme and informs Ernest and some members of the band. While Ernest is leading the halftime show with his unique routines, four band members sneak off to try and prevent the fix from going through. With the help of the two science teachers, they infiltrate the locker room with sleeping gas, effectively replacing the football team to win the game themselves. During the game between the rival team and the replacements, the science teachers show Ernest their new brain accelerator. Ernest immediately charges up and becomes the new quarterback for the team. With his new, intelligent strategies, the tide turns and they begin to rally. However, in the last play of the game, Ernest forgets to recharge and loses his intelligence. He ends up rolling down field on a drum after the ball that was thrown and makes a miraculous catch in the end zone for the game-winning touchdown. In the midst of the celebration, the football players arrive from the locker room in bewilderment. The board chairperson made aware of the inspector's actions and intentions, as well as the coach's involvement. Chickasaw Falls High School is able to stay open, and both the coach and the inspector are fired. Ernest earns his high school diploma as he passed the final exam, and is permitted to keep his job.

== Cast ==
- Jim Varney as Ernest P. Worrell
- Linda Kash as Gerta
- Bill Byrge as Bobby
- Jason Michas as Donald
- Sarah Chalke as Maisy
- Gabe Khouth as Rodney
- Corrine Koslo as Miss Flugal
- Russell Porter as Brad
- Will Sasso as Russell
- Duncan Fraser as Coach Decker
- French Tickner as Principal Procter
- Kevin McNulty as Axwell
- David Keith as Squint Westwood
- Lorena Gale as history teacher
- Michael Roberds as server

== Release ==
The film received a limited theatrical release in Cincinnati, Ohio on June 10, 1994, and in Louisville, Kentucky on July 29. It was released on direct-to-video on December 14, 1994, and the first to not have a wide theatrical release.
