= Jim Varney =

American actor and comedian (1949–2000)

- Promotional photo of Varney for The Expert (1995)
- Born: James Albert Varney Jr. June 15, 1949; Lexington, Kentucky, U.S.
- Died: February 10, 2000 (aged 50); White House, Tennessee, U.S.
- Resting place: Lexington Cemetery
- Occupations: Actor; comedian
- Years active: 1957–2000
- Notable work: Ernest franchise Toy Story
- Spouses: Jacqueline Drew (m. 1977; div. 1983); Jane Varney (m. 1988; div. 1991)

James Albert Varney Jr. (June 15, 1949 – February 10, 2000) was an American actor and comedian. He is best known for his Emmy Award winning comedic role as Ernest P. Worrell, originating in a series of television commercial advertising campaigns, and later growing into a film and television franchise. He played Jed Clampett in the 1993 The Beverly Hillbillies film adaptation, and also covered a song for the film titled "Hot Rod Lincoln". He voiced Slinky Dog in the first two films of the Toy Story franchise (1995–1999). He died of lung cancer on February 10, 2000, leaving two posthumous releases, Daddy and Them and Atlantis: The Lost Empire.

== Early life ==
Varney was born in Lexington, Kentucky, the son of Nancy Louise (née Howard), and James Albert Varney Sr. As a child, he displayed the ability to memorize long poems and significant portions of the material from books, which he used to entertain family and friends. When Varney was a boy, his mother would turn on cartoons for him to watch. His mother discovered that Varney quickly began to imitate the cartoon characters, so she started him in children's theater when he was eight years old. Varney began his interest in theater as a teenager, winning state titles in drama competitions while a student at Lafayette High School (class of 1968) in Lexington.

At the age of 15, he portrayed Ebenezer Scrooge in a local theater production; by 17, he was performing professionally in nightclubs and coffee houses. In the 1970s, Varney studied Shakespeare at the Barter Theatre in Abingdon, Virginia, and performed in an Opryland folk show in its first year of operation. He listed a former teacher, Thelma Beeler, as being a mentor in his becoming an actor. When he was 24, Varney was an actor at the Pioneer Playhouse in Danville, Kentucky. The theater was adjacent to an Old West-themed village, and before the show, the audience would tour the village where apprentices would play townsfolk. Varney and the company usually played in the outdoor theater to audiences of only a few dozen people. He entertained the young apprentices by throwing knives into trees. He performed in Blithe Spirit, Boeing 707 and an original musical, Fire on the Mountain. He once jokingly threatened a long-haired apprentice, John Lino Ponzini, that he would take him up to Hazard, Kentucky, where "you [Ponzini] wouldn't make it down Main Street without the townsfolk giving you a crewcut".

== Career ==
=== Early career ===
Varney had an established acting career before his fame as Ernest. In 1976, Varney was a regular cast member of the television show Johnny Cash and Friends. In 1977–78, he appeared as recurring guest Virgil Simms on the talk show parody Fernwood 2 Night and America 2 Night. From 1977 to 1979, Varney was cast as Seaman "Doom & Gloom" Broom in the television version of Operation Petticoat. Just prior to his stint as Ernest, he was a cast member on the notorious television flop Pink Lady and Jeff. In 1978, Varney played Milo Skinner on the TV show Alice.

=== Work for Carden and Cherry ===
Varney's best-known character is Ernest P. Worrell, who would address the camera as if speaking to a friend, using his trademarked catchphrase "Knowhutimean, Vern?" In 1980, the first commercial featuring the character advertised an appearance by the Dallas Cowboys Cheerleaders at Beech Bend Park, an amusement park located near Bowling Green, Kentucky. The character was franchised for use in markets all over the country and was often used by dairies to advertise milk products. For example, the ice cream and hamburger chain Braum's ran several advertisements featuring Ernest; Purity Dairies, based in Nashville, Pine State Dairy in Raleigh, North Carolina, and Oakhurst Dairy in Maine ran commercials that were nearly identical, but with the dairy name changed.

For the same agency, Varney created a different character, Sgt. Glory, a humorless drill instructor who harangued cows of the client dairy into producing better milk. In another spot, Sgt. Glory's home was shown, which was so heavily decorated with the products of the sponsor and advertising specialty items that it was essentially devoid of any other decor. The Sgt. Glory character also appeared in an advertisement for a Southern grocery chain, Pruett's Food Town, in which he drilled the checkout clerks on proper behavior: "Bread on top. Repeat: Bread on top." He approaches one of them at the end of the commercial with a look of menace and says, "You're not smilin'." The checkout bagger gives a very nervous and forced smile.

Varney also starred as Ernest in a series of commercials that ran in the New Orleans area (and throughout the Gulf South) as a spokesman for natural gas utilities. In one, he is seen kneeling down in front of Vern's desk under a lamp hanging from the ceiling, stating, "Natural gas, Vern; it's hot, fast, and cheap. Hot, fast, cheap; kinda like your first wife, Vern, you know, the pretty one!?" Vern then knocks the lamp into Ernest's head, knocking him down. Those same television advertisements also were featured on channels in the St. Louis area for Laclede Gas Company during the mid-1980s and in the metro Detroit area for Michigan Consolidated Gas Company. Another TV ad for Laclede Gas featured Ernest saying, "Heat pump, schmeat pump."

Varney also appeared in several Braum's Ice Cream and Dairy Stores commercials throughout the 1980s. These aired on Oklahoma television. He made commercials for car dealerships across the country, most notably Cerritos Auto Square in Cerritos, California, Tysons Toyota in Tysons Corner, Virginia, and Audubon Chrysler in Henderson, Kentucky.

Varney portrayed Ernest in a series of commercials for Convenient Food Mart during the 1980s. In 1982, Varney co-hosted the syndicated Pop! Goes the Country with singer Tom T. Hall. The show had just had a major overhaul and ended shortly afterward. He also portrayed "Auntie Nelda" in numerous commercials; dressed in drag and appearing to be a senior citizen, the commercials gave off the tone of "Auntie Nelda" as a motherly lady encouraging one to do what was right (in this case, buy whatever product was being promoted). This character, along with the "Ernest" character, ran for a few years in Mississippi and Louisiana in commercials for Leadco Aluminum Siding, before it became a regular in the Ernest films. Varney also appeared as Ernest in on-air promos for local TV stations in several markets, talking about their news and weather personalities.

During the 1990s, Varney reprised his role as Ernest for Blake's Lotaburger, a fast-food chain in New Mexico. In these commercials, Ernest typically would be trying to get into Vern's house to see what food Vern was eating. After a lengthy description of whatever tasty morsel Vern had, Ernest would get locked out but would continue to shout from outside.

=== Ernest's popularity ===
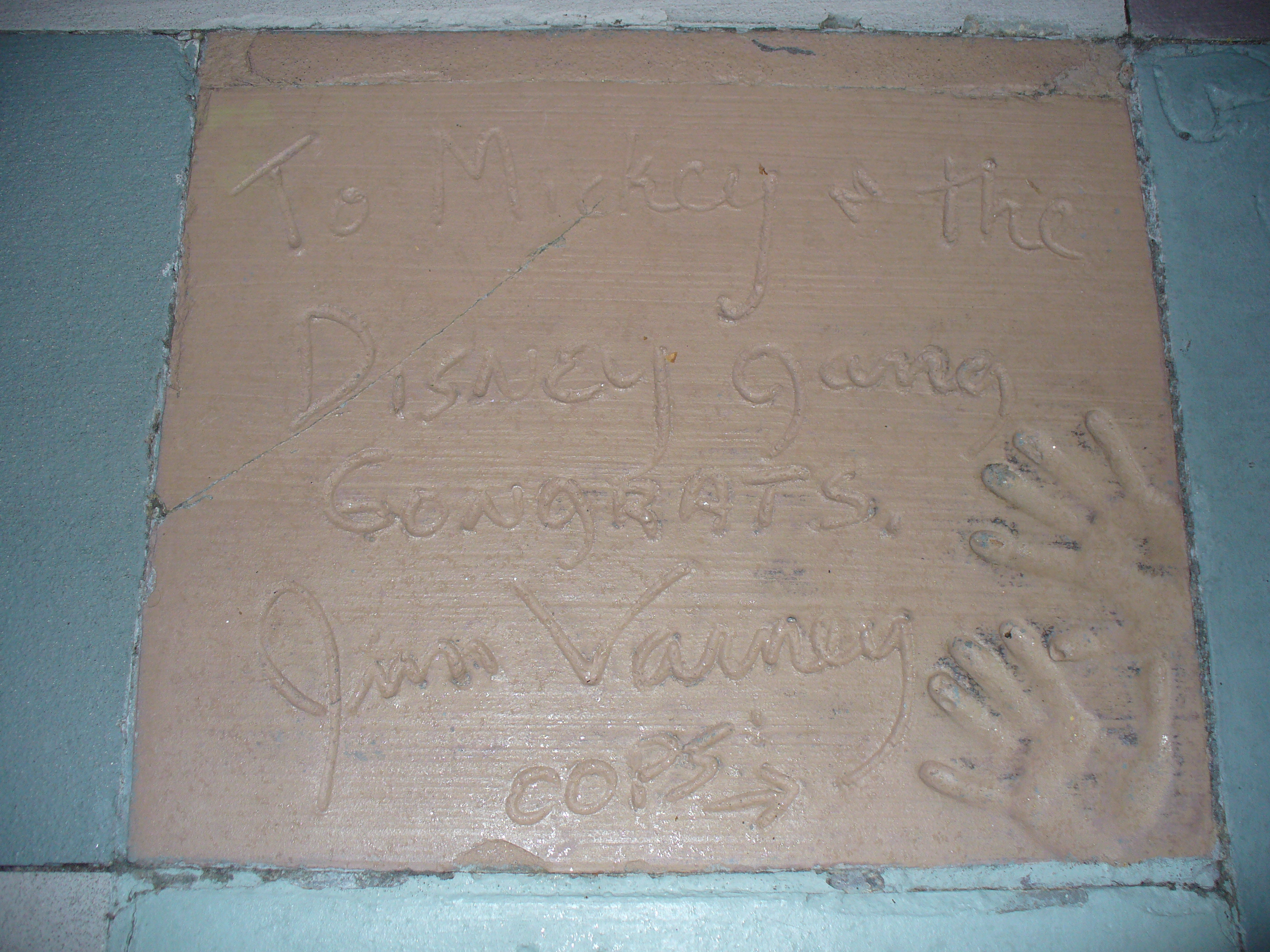
Jim Varney's handprints, displayed at Disney World

The character of Ernest became widely popular, and was the basis for a short-lived TV series, Hey Vern, It's Ernest! (1988) and a series of films in the 1980s and 1990s.

Ernest Goes to Camp (1987) grossed $23.5 million at the U.S. box office, on a $3.5 million production budget, and stayed in the box-office top five for its first three weeks of release. Though Varney was nominated for the Razzie Award for Worst New Star, only one year later, he earned the Daytime Emmy Award for Outstanding Performer in a Children's Series for Hey Vern, It's Ernest! Subsequent theatrically released Ernest films include Ernest Saves Christmas (1988), Ernest Goes to Jail (1990), Ernest Scared Stupid (1991), and Ernest Rides Again (1993). After the financial failure of Ernest Rides Again, all further films were released direct-to-video: Ernest Goes to School (1994) which had a limited theatrical run in Ohio and Kentucky, Slam Dunk Ernest (1995), Ernest Goes to Africa (1997), and Ernest in the Army (1998).

The Walt Disney World Resort's Epcot theme park featured Ernest. Epcot's Cranium Command attraction used the Ernest character in its preshow as an example of a "lovable, but not the brightest person on the planet" type of person. In addition to his Ernest Goes to... series, he starred as Ernest in several smaller films for John R. Cherry III, such as Knowhutimean? Hey Vern, It's My Family Album; Dr. Otto and the Riddle of the Gloom Beam; and the direct-to-video feature Your World as I See It, all of which showcased him in a wide variety of characters and accents.

=== Other roles ===
From 1983 to 1984, Varney played heartthrob Chad Everett's younger brother Evan Earp in the comedy-drama, high-action television series The Rousters, created by Stephen J. Cannell, about the descendants of Wyatt Earp, a family of bounty hunters/carnival bouncers. As Evan Earp, Varney played a con man/mechanical-inventor "genius," constantly getting himself into comedic trouble, with those around him ready to lynch him. Although the series was promising, the show failed after its first season because it was poorly slotted (four episodes every few months) against the number-one prime-time television series for the previous six years, The Love Boat.

Varney can be seen in Hank Williams Jr.'s video for "All My Rowdy Friends Are Coming Over Tonight", in which he is briefly shown casually riding a bull being pulled on a rope by a young lady, and later in a swimming pool with two young ladies.

In 1985, Varney co-hosted HBO's New Year's Eve special, along with Johnny Cash and Kris Kristofferson. Varney also starred as Jed Clampett in the 1993 production of The Beverly Hillbillies; played Rex, a carnival worker/associate of Dennis Quaid in Wilder Napalm; and played the accident-prone entertainer/watch guard ("safety guy/human torch") Rudy James in the film Snowboard Academy. He later played a small role in the 1995 action film The Expert as a weapons dealer named Snake.

Varney also voiced Slinky Dog in the first two films of the Toy Story franchise, with his friend Blake Clark replacing him following his death. Toy Story 2 was Varney's final film released during his lifetime. Varney played numerous other characters in film and television, including "Cookie" Farnsworth, from Atlantis: The Lost Empire, released the year after his death (Steven Barr replaced Varney for the sequel Atlantis: Milo's Return); the carny character Cooder in the "Bart Carny" episode of The Simpsons; the character Walt Evergreen in the Duckman episode "You've Come a Wrong Way, Baby"; Prince Carlos Charmaine (a royal suitor to Laurie Metcalf's character in the final season of the 1990s television series Roseanne; and Lothar Zogg in the 1998 film 3 Ninjas: High Noon at Mega Mountain, also starring Hulk Hogan and Loni Anderson.

Varney had an against type role as an abusive father in the independent film 100 Proof (1997), for which he received good reviews from critics. He also played a rebel in the midnight movie Existo, as well as an old mariner in a low-budget horror film, Blood, Friends, and Money. During the filming of Treehouse Hostage, he played an escaped fraudster held hostage in a treehouse and tormented by some fifth graders.

One of Varney's final films was Billy Bob Thornton's Daddy and Them, in which he played Uncle Hazel, who had been arrested for murder. Co-stars included Kelly Preston and Andy Griffith. Another final guest appearance was the Bibleman Genesis series Bibleman Jr. Volume 1 & 2 as himself. Varney starred in three videos, The Misadventures of Bubba, The Misadventures of Bubba II, and Bubba Goes Hunting, in which he played himself and taught young kids important safety rules about hunting and guns. He illustrated the rules with the help of his bumbling and accident-prone cousin Bubba (also played by Varney) and Bubba's nephew, Billy Bob. The videos were distributed as part of a membership pack from Buckmasters' Young Bucks Club.

According to an interview, one of his final projects was writing a screenplay about the legendary Hatfield–McCoy feud, stating that his grandfather hunted squirrel with the Hatfields. Varney also allegedly had been hoping to acquire more serious acting roles before his death, wanting to step outside the typecast of Ernest.

== Personal life ==
Varney was married twice, first to Jacqueline Drew and then to Jane Varney. Both marriages ended in divorce, although he remained friends with his ex-wife Jane until his death. She became Varney's spokeswoman and accompanied him to the premiere of Pixar's 1999 film Toy Story 2. Neither marriage resulted in any children.

According to colleagues and industry insiders interviewed for the E! True Hollywood Story documentary on Varney, he privately struggled with cocaine use during the peak of his career, a problem that was reportedly unknown to many of those around him at the time. He also struggled with severe alcohol abuse, reportedly using alcohol as a means of coping with depression and the pressures associated with fame. Varney later described himself as the “poster child of self-abuse.”

On December 6, 2013, Varney's nephew Justin Lloyd published a comprehensive biography about his uncle titled The Importance of Being Ernest: The Life of Actor Jim Varney (Stuff that Vern doesn't even know). The same year, director John R. Cherry III released a Varney biography called Keeper of the Clown.

As of 2022, director David Pagano and Ernest Goes to Camp cast member Daniel Butler are planning to release a documentary about Varney called The Importance of Being Ernest.

Varney was Christian according to his nephew Justin Lloyd's book, and even stated in his final interview with the Nashville Scene "I've become more spiritual, and I realize that I'm closer to God than I've ever been. It's made me reflect back on a lot of the wasted time in my life, which to some extent I had control over and to some extent I didn't."

Varney was an accomplished mountain dulcimer player and played the instrument on the last episode of The Chevy Chase Show.

== Illness and death ==
Varney was a longtime chain smoker. During the filming of Treehouse Hostage in August 1998, Varney developed a nagging cough, which he initially believed to be caused by a cold. However, as his condition worsened, Varney sought medical treatment and was diagnosed with lung cancer.

Following his diagnosis, Varney underwent surgery to remove most of his right lung and received radiation treatment. He also underwent chemotherapy while continuing to act. In 1999, he filmed Daddy and Them despite his illness. On November 13, 1999, he was photographed attending the premiere of Toy Story 2, which featured his final vocal performance of Slinky Dog. He died less than three months later on February 10, 2000, at his home in White House, Tennessee, at the age of 50. He was buried in Lexington Cemetery in Lexington, Kentucky.

== Filmography ==
=== Film ===
Year	Title	Role	Notes
1982	Spittin' Image	Sheriff	
1983	Knowhutimean? Hey Vern, It's My Family Album	Ernest P. Worrell / Davy Worrell & Company / Ace Worrell / Lloyd Worrell / Billy Boogie Worrell / Rhetch Worrell / Pop Worrell	
1985	Dr. Otto and the Riddle of the Gloom Beam	Dr. Otto / Ernest P. Worrell / Rudd Hardtact / Laughin' Jack / Guy Dandy / Auntie Nelda	
1986	Ernest's Greatest Hits Volume 1 (The Ernest Film Festival)	Ernest P. Worrell	
1987	Ernest Goes to Camp	Ernest P. Worrell	
1987	Hey Vern, Win $10,000...Or Just Count on Having Fun!	Ernest P. Worrell	
1988	Ernest Saves Christmas	Ernest P. Worrell / Aster Clement / The Governor's Student / Auntie Nelda / Mrs. Brock / Marty's Mother / The Snake Guy	
1989	Fast Food	Wrangler Bob Bundy	
1990	Ernest Goes to Jail	Ernest P. Worrell / Felix Nash / Auntie Nelda	
1991	Ernest Scared Stupid	Ernest P. Worrell / Phineas Worrell / Auntie Nelda / Various Relatives	
1992	Ernest's Greatest Hits Volume 2	Ernest P. Worrell	
1993	Wilder Napalm	Rex	
1993	The Beverly Hillbillies	Jed Clampett	
1993	Ernest Rides Again	Ernest P. Worrell	
1994	Ernest Goes to School	Ernest P. Worrell	
1995	The Expert	Snake	
1995	Slam Dunk Ernest	Ernest P. Worrell	
1995	Toy Story	Slinky Dog	Voice
1995	Bubba Goes Hunting	Bubba	
1995	The 4th of July Parade	Cletus Jones	
1996	Snowboard Academy	Rudy James	
1997	Ernest Goes to Africa	Ernest P. Worrell / Hey You, the Hindu / Auntie Nelda / African Woman Dancer	
1997	100 Proof	Rae's Father	
1997	Blood, Friends and Money	The Old Mariner	
1997	Annabelle's Wish	Mr. Gus Holder	Voice
1998	Ernest in the Army	Pvt./Capt. Ernest P. Worrell / Operation Sandtrap Arab	
1998	3 Ninjas: High Noon at Mega Mountain	Lothar Zogg	
1999	Existo	Marcel Horowitz	
1999	Treehouse Hostage	Carl Banks	
1999	Toy Story 2	Slinky Dog	Voice, final film released during his lifetime
2001	Daddy and Them	Hazel Montgomery	Posthumous release, final on-screen film appearance
2001	Atlantis: The Lost Empire	Jebidiah 'Cookie' Farnsworth	Voice, posthumous release, final film role; dedicated to his memory

=== Television ===
Year	Title	Role	Notes
1976	Dinah!	Himself	1 episode
1977	Operation Petticoat	Seaman 'Doom & Gloom' Broom	26 episodes
1977	Fernwood 2 Night	Virgil Simms	3 episodes
1978	America 2-Night	Virgil Simms	3 episodes
1978	Alice	Milo Skinner	Episode: "Better Never Than Later"
1978	1979	Alan King's Third Annual Final Warning!	Various characters
1980	Pink Lady	6 episodes	Various characters
1982–1983	Pop! Goes the Country	Bobby Burbank / 'Shotglass' The Bartender / Bunny The Barmaid	Unknown episodes
1983	The Rousters	Evan Earp	Pilot film
1983	The Rousters	Evan Earp	13 episodes
1988	Hey Vern, It's Ernest!	Ernest P. Worrell / Various characters	
1988–1989	Happy New Year, America	Ernest P. Worrell / Correspondent	Live New Year's Eve special
1989	Ernest Goes to Splash Mountain	Ernest P. Worrell	
1990	Disneyland	Ernest P. Worrell / Ernest's Father	Episode: "Disneyland's 35th Anniversary Celebration"
1990	Disneyland's 35th Anniversary Celebration	Ernest P. Worrell	
1994	XXX's & OOO's		Cameo
1996	Roseanne	Prince Carlos	2 episodes
1997	Duckman	Walt Evergreen	Voice, episode: "You've Come a Wrong Way, Baby"
1998	Hercules	King Ephialtes	Voice, episode: "Hercules and the Muse of Dance"
1998	The Simpsons	Cooder	Voice, episode: "Bart Carny"
2000	Bibleman Jr.	Himself	2 episodes

=== Video games ===
Year	Title	Voice role	Notes
1995	Disney's Animated Storybook: Toy Story	Slinky Dog	
1996	Toy Story: Activity Center	Slinky Dog	
1996	Animated Storybook: Toy Story	Slinky Dog	
1999	Toy Story 2: Buzz Lightyear to the Rescue	Slinky Dog	
2001	Atlantis: The Lost Empire	Cookie	Released posthumously

== Awards and nominations ==
Year	Film	Award	Category	Result	Ref.
1987	Ernest Goes to Camp	Razzie Award	Golden Raspberry Award for Worst New Star	Nominated	
1989	Hey Vern, It's Ernest!	Daytime Emmy Award	Outstanding Performer in a Children's Series	Won	
