= Braum's =

American restaurant chain

Braum's Inc.

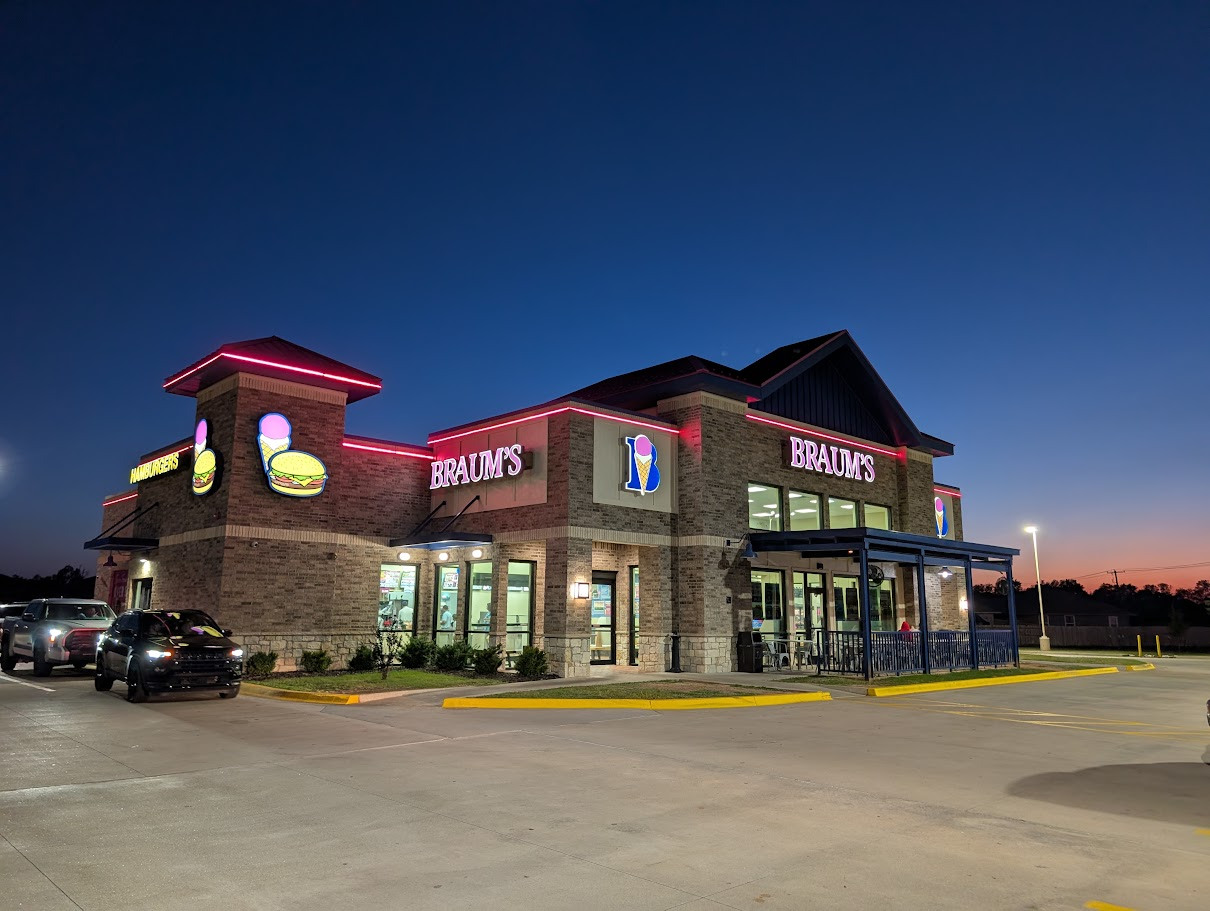
- Braum's location in Yukon, Oklahoma
- Type: Private
- Industry: Food and beverage; Restaurants
- Founded: 1968; 58 years ago in Oklahoma City, Oklahoma, U.S.
- Founder: William Henry "Bill" Braum
- Headquarters: Oklahoma City, Oklahoma, U.S.
- Number of locations: 300+
- Area served: United States
- Key people: Drew Braum (President and CEO); Mark Godwin (CFO)
- Products: Ice cream, soft serve, frozen yogurt, milkshakes, sundaes, hamburgers, chicken, french fries, soft drinks, salads
- Services: Fast food restaurants Ice cream parlor Dairy store
- Revenue: ▲US$5 billion (2021)
- Owner: Braum family
- Number of employees: 8,000 as of December 2021
- Website: braums.com

Braum's Inc. is an American chain of ice cream parlor, fast food restaurants, and grocery stores. Based in Oklahoma City, Braum's was founded in 1968 by William Henry "Bill" Braum in Oklahoma City. The company operates over 300 restaurants in 5 states, primarily in the Southern United States, namely the West South Central states of Oklahoma and Texas.

== History ==
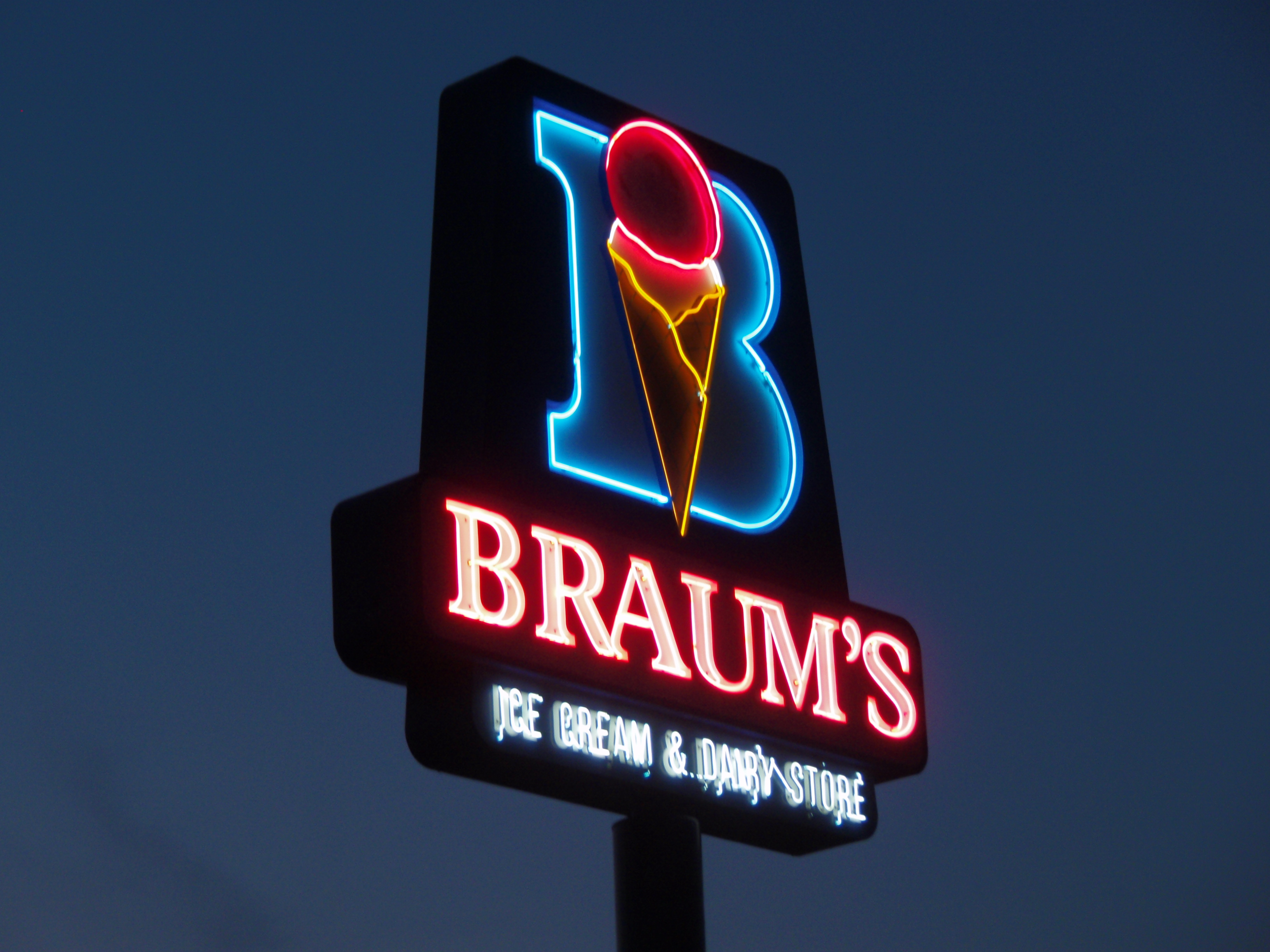
A Braum's neon sign in Kansas

In 1957, William Henry "Bill" Braum (1928–2020) purchased his family's ice cream processing business based in Emporia, Kansas, as well as its "Peter Pan" retail ice cream chain; ten years later, the Peter Pan stores were sold, under the condition that the Braum family would not sell ice cream in Kansas for ten years.

After keeping the family dairy herd and ice cream processing business, Braum and his wife, Mary, started the Braum's chain in 1968 in Oklahoma City, opening 24 stores in Oklahoma in the first year. For the first few years, Braum's brought products from its Emporia headquarters to Oklahoma, then opened facilities in Oklahoma and moved the herd there in 1975.

Braum's ran a series of Ernest P. Worrell television commercials in the 1980s.

== Stores ==
In order to maintain the freshness of its products, the company does not open stores outside of a 330-mile (483 km) radius of the home farm in Tuttle, Oklahoma. As of 2026, there are 327 total stores in operation, with 146 stores in Oklahoma (45%), 120 in Texas (37%), 32 in Kansas (10%), 15 in Missouri (5%), and 14 stores in Arkansas (4%).

== Products ==
The restaurants serve ice cream, frozen yogurt, hamburgers, sandwiches, salads and breakfast items. Stores also include a grocery section called the "Fresh Market" featuring dairy products, baked goods, beverages, frozen entrees, meats and produce.

Braum's is noteworthy for its level of vertical integration. Braum's processes or manufactures almost all the food products it sells; it owns its own feed mill, dairy herd, dairy processing plant, bakery, stores, and delivery trucks. It also owns eight farms and ranches totaling 40,000 acres (160 km^{2}), as well as its flagship dairy farm in Tuttle, Oklahoma. The dairy farm has set times when it is open for public tours and is a popular destination for school field trips. Braum's describes itself as the only major ice cream maker that still milks its own cows. It also produces the packaging used for its dairy products.

=== A2 milk ===
Braum's Family Farm has the largest A2 milk dairy herd in the United States. A1 and A2 are genetic variants of the beta-casein milk protein. It took over 12 years to build the A2 herd. With the A2 herd, Braum’s now produces only A2 milk for sale in its own stores.
