= Dr. Otto and the Riddle of the Gloom Beam =

1985 film by John Cherry

- VHS release poster
- Directed by: John Cherry
- Written by: John Cherry; Coke Sams
- Produced by: Coke Sams
- Starring: Jim Varney
- Cinematography: Jim May
- Edited by: Pamela Scott Arnold
- Music by: Shane Keister
- Production companies: Carden & Cherry; Studio Productions
- Distributed by: Web Productions
- Release date: July 19, 1985
- Running time: 92 minutes
- Country: United States
- Language: English
- Budget: $800,000

Dr. Otto and the Riddle of the Gloom Beam is a 1985 American science fiction comedy film starring Jim Varney. It was written and directed by John Cherry (in his directorial debut). It is the first film to feature the Ernest P. Worrell character, but it has a slightly darker tone than his later films. It was shot in Fall Creek Falls State Park, Boxwell Scout Reservation, and Nashville, Tennessee.

== Plot ==
Ernest P. Worrell is showing off a new device he has bartered from a guy off the street. He called it a "changing coffin" that transforms the user into any disguise. Ernest enters the coffin as Vern flips a switch, then Ernest gets pulled in screaming.

Dr. Otto is a mysterious villain with a hand attached on top of his head. He is plotting world domination using his "gloom beam," an electromagnetic device that he uses to launch attacks on financial institutions to erase their contents and cause worldwide chaos. In a broadcast signal intrusion, Dr. Otto announces the "Riddle of the Gloom Beam:"

Dr. Otto's first target is Cincinnati, Ohio, where a bank affected by the Gloom Beam decides to disrupt Dr. Otto's scheme before it can cause world chaos by sending in his archnemesis: all-American boy Lance Sterling, born on the same day in the same hospital as Dr. Otto. While Lance was a gifted child born to loving parents, Dr. Otto was the result of a botched abortion, neglected by his parents (whom he later kills). To foil Lance, Dr. Otto uses a "changing coffin" and transforms himself into various characters in an effort to stop the heroes: Rudd Hardtack, Australian trainer of child militants; Laughing Jack O'Cockney, pirate captain; Auntie Nelda, the cantankerous elderly woman; and Guy Dandy, wealthy playboy.

Lance and his sidekick Doris Talbert escape each disguise in unusual ways: they survive Hardtack's game of Russian roulette; when Laughing Jack uses Lance as bait to catch a swamp monster, the monster turns out to be an old friend of Lance's, who lets them free; when Auntie Nelda drugs them into a trap, Lance is able to sway Tina (a woman Dr. Otto used as bait) into using Dr. Otto's transporter blanket to get them out; and they stumble into an elevator that leads straight to Dr. Otto's lair during a chase with Guy Dandy. Meanwhile, the gloom beam continues to cause chaos around the world, with comical effects.

Lance and Doris face off against Dr. Otto, all his disguises, and his robot henchman. In the end, it comes down to Lance choosing between a conspicuously labeled "Right Button" and "Wrong Button." He chooses the Right Button and massive electric bolts fire off in all directions; the lair self-destructs.

The scene then flash-cuts to Doris, Lance and Tina pushing their car down a road. At a gas station, they encounter Ernest, who informs them that they have had no gas since the money went bad. As they all push the car down the road, Ernest takes his hat off to reveal Dr. Otto's third hand.

== Cast ==
- Jim Varney as Dr. Otto von Schnick / Rudd Hardtack / Laughin' Jack / Guy Dandy / Auntie Nelda / Ernest P. Worrell (uncredited)
- Glenn Petach as Otto's Head Hand
- Myke R. Mueller as Lance
- Jackie Welch as Doris
- Daniel Butler as Slave Willie
- Esther Huston as Tina
- Bill Byrge as gas station attendant

== Production ==
Coke Sams recalled "some contrary impulses" in the decision to focus their first movie on a character other than their breakout star, Ernest. He recalled the film as a learning experience and one that played into their favor when The Walt Disney Company expressed interest in an Ernest film series.

The film was originally conceived as the first in a series of films. A sequel, Song of the Tarantula Women, was in development before, as Sams recalled, "Disney intervened."

== Release ==
The film was released in limited theaters on July 19, 1985.

== Home media ==
The film was originally distributed on VHS in 1986 by KnoWhutImean Home Video. It was re-released on VHS in 1992 by GoodTimes Home Video. It was digitally remastered and released on DVD by Echo Bridge Home Entertainment in 2007, and was later included in the Best of Ernest DVD boxset released by Image Entertainment in 2012.
