= Ernest P. Worrell =

Fictional character

- Jim Varney as Ernest P. Worrell
- First appearance: 1980
- Last appearance: Ernest in the Army (1998)
- Created by: Carden & Cherry Advertising Agency
- Portrayed by: Jim Varney; John C. Hudgens

In-universe information
- Alias: Ernest Powertools Worrell
- Gender: Male
- Family: Pa Worrell (father); Ma Worrell (mother); Bunny J. Rogers (sister); Coy Worrell (brother)

Ernest P. Worrell is a fictional character that was portrayed by American actor Jim Varney in a series of television commercials and then later in a television series (Hey Vern, It's Ernest!) and a series of feature films.

Ernest—created by Varney with the Nashville advertising agency Carden & Cherry—was used in various local television ad campaigns. The only national products the character promoted were The Coca-Cola Company's sodas, Chex cereals, and Taco John's. The first Ernest commercial, filmed in 1980, advertised an appearance by the Dallas Cowboys Cheerleaders at Beech Bend Park, an amusement park near Bowling Green, Kentucky.

The format of the Ernest commercials seldom varied, most often scripted to be comedic and fast-paced. The rubber-faced, Southern-accented Ernest, almost always dressed in a denim vest and a baseball cap, appeared at the door or window of an unseen, unheard, and seemingly unwilling neighbor named Vernon, or "Vern" for short. The spots were structured in a way to allow the viewer to be "Vern", as Varney looked directly into the camera whenever Ernest addressed Vern. Ernest's seemingly pointless conversations with Vern - delivered essentially in monologue to an unresponsive listener - inevitably rambled around to a favorable description of the sponsor's product, followed by Ernest's signature close, "KnowhutImean?"

== History ==
The Ernest ads were shot with a handheld film camera at the Nashville-area home of producer John Cherry III and Jerry Carden, beginning in 1980. As their number of clients increased, Varney sometimes did upwards of 25 different versions of a spot in a single day. Producer Coke Sams stated that Varney had a photographic memory and would read through the script one time then insert the various products' names on different takes. The commercials and the character had definite impact; children, especially, seemed to imitate Ernest and, "Knowwhatimean?", became a catchphrase. The ads were written by a team that included Varney, Cherry, Glenn Petach, Dan Butler, Steve Leasure, and Gil Templeton.

Carden & Cherry had begun receiving requests from major national companies to use Ernest, but were largely unable to agree to most of them because of conflicts with the exclusive rights local companies received when they had requested Ernest commercials. The company also felt that the volume of local commercials made it a more viable business model than targeting a handful of national companies that might lead the Ernest character to burn out; they estimated 4,000 commercials were produced over the course of the character's run. Carden & Cherry responded by transitioning the character to film and television. Ernest's first feature-film appearance was as one of Varney's numerous characters in the science fiction horror spoof Dr. Otto and the Riddle of the Gloom Beam, which introduced several supporting actors who would reappear throughout the Ernest franchise, including Bill Byrge, Myke R. Mueller, and Jackie Welch.

Ernest's appearance at the Indianapolis 500 drew the attention of The Walt Disney Company. A Saturday morning sketch comedy series, Hey Vern, It's Ernest!, followed shortly thereafter, which won Varney a Daytime Emmy Award for his performance. A series of five feature-length comedies starred Ernest between 1987 and 1993, The movies were not critically well-received; however, they were produced on very low budgets and were quite profitable; after Disney dropped the series following four pictures, Cherry struck a three-picture agreement with Capital Cities to release films both for video release and for television on the ABC network.

In the films, Ernest is apparently somewhat aware of his extreme resistance to harm, as in Ernest Rides Again, he seemed barely fazed by nails bending after being fired at his skull, remarking "Good thing they hit the hard end", he also commented that he would be dead "If I wasn't this close to being an actual cartoon." To allow Varney to act out his numerous other characters, Ernest is portrayed as a master of disguise, able to pose as one of any number of relatives to get out of a predicament. He also is impervious to electrocution, though it did inflict various comical side effects as seen in Ernest Goes to Jail. The film series portrays Ernest as a working-class bachelor holding various minimum-wage and blue-collar jobs, such as a gas station attendant, janitor, sanitation worker and construction worker.

In his Ernest role, Varney appeared in dozens of Cerritos Auto Square commercials for many years on Los Angeles area television stations; he also appeared in commercials for Audubon Chrysler Center in Henderson, Kentucky, John L. Sullivan auto dealerships in the Sacramento, California area, the Pontiac, Michigan-based electronics store ABC Warehouse, and the Oklahoma City-based Braum's Ice Cream and Dairy Store. In the Southeast, the Ernest character was the spokesman for Purity milk. In New Mexico, he appeared in commercials for Blake's Lotaburger. In northern Virginia Ernest appeared a series of commercials for Tyson's Toyota. In South Dakota, he appeared in commercials for Lewis Drug.

In Houston, he did commercials promoting Channel 2 News KPRC-TV. In 2005, five years after Varney's death, the Ernest P. Worrell character returned in new commercials as a CGI cartoon, created by an animation company called face2face and produced by Ernest originators Carden & Cherry. Ernest was voiced by John C. Hudgens, an advertising and broadcast producer from Little Rock, Arkansas, who also played an Ernest type character in some regional live action commercials.

== Specials ==
- Hey Vern, It's My Family Album (1983) (direct-to-video)
- The Ernest Film Festival (1986) (direct-to-video)

- A compilation of Ernest commercials

- Hey Vern, Win $10,000...Or Just Count On Having Fun! (1987) (direct-to-video)

- A compilation of Ernest commercials, the VHS included a sweepstakes in which viewers who correctly counted the total mentions of the words "Vern" and "Knowhutimean?" in the video and submitted their answer before April 1, 1988 would be entered into a random drawing to win a $10,000 prize.

- Ernest Goes to Splash Mountain (1989) (TV special)
- Ernest's Greatest Hits (1992)

- Two-volume compilation of The Ernest Film Festival and Hey Vern, Win $10,000 with the sweepstakes removed.

- Your World As I See It (1994) (direct-to-video)

Ernest also hosted Happy New Year, America for CBS in the late 1980s; Varney also briefly gave Ernest an appearance on HBO's New Year special (which was co-hosted by Johnny Cash and Kris Kristofferson) heading into 1985. Ernest also appeared in Comic Relief USA for the 1989 season. This show notably featured Vern appearing physically for the first time, played by Doug Cox. Varney also indirectly reprised the role in the variety show Viva Variety in the late 1990s, in which Varney and Thomas Lennon adapted a scene from Oscar Wilde's The Importance of Being Earnest so that the titular Ernest Worthing from the play, whom the two leading men both try to impersonate, was instead Ernest P. Worrell.

== Films and television ==
Films

- 1985: Dr. Otto and the Riddle of the Gloom Beam as Unnamed Cameo Role, Dr. Otto's Disguise
- 1987: Ernest Goes to Camp
- 1988: Ernest Saves Christmas
- 1990: Ernest Goes to Jail
- 1991: Ernest Scared Stupid
- 1993: Ernest Rides Again
- 1994: Ernest Goes to School (limited release)
- 1995: Slam Dunk Ernest (direct-to-video)
- 1997: Ernest Goes to Africa (direct-to-video)
- 1998: Ernest in the Army (direct-to-video)

Television

- 1988: Hey Vern, It's Ernest!

=== Scrapped films ===
In 1990, seven Ernest films were reported to be in development. According to a 2011 interview with Coke Sams, one film, Ernest Spaced Out may have gotten as far as a film treatment. Sams said about the film, "I believe that was kind of a Lost in Space epic. It seems like there were astronauts and maybe a space capsule."

Soon after the release of Ernest Goes to Camp, several more films were being contemplated, including Ernest the Bellhop, Ernest and the Water Baby and Ernest in Paradise.

Sams said a script had been written for Ernest and the Voodoo Curse: "We went back to the Abbott & Costello Meet Frankenstein kind of thing. It had a really bad guy and happened on an island like Hawaii. ... So we had Voodoo and a high priest. It was like the idiot version of Raiders of the Lost Ark. We had lines of zombies, Voodoo potions, and Ernest pretending to be a zombie. Ernest and the Voodoo Curse actually was pretty funny. There was a woman in it, who had one blue eye and one brown eye. She was supposed to be the woman of Ernest's dreams. Of course, she would have nothing to do with him."

A second Dr. Otto film, Song of the Tarantula Women, was developed, but Disney vetoed the project.

The 1999 film Pirates of the Plain was originally written for Varney, but specifically avoided him being cast as Ernest; ultimately, Tim Curry filled the role Varney was slated to play.

=== Cancelled reboot ===
In October 2012, a reboot was announced tentatively titled Son of Ernest, following Ernest's long lost son. Dan Ewan was set to write the script with John Cherry, Coke Sams and Clarke Gallivan set to produce for Ruckusfilm. Kentucky comedian Billy Crank, who had often cosplayed as Ernest, was unofficially anointed by John Cherry himself to take over the role of Ernest's son in the film. The project was scrapped by September 2013.

== Commercials on home video ==
Most of Ernest's commercials were released on VHS tapes, and are also available on DVD from Mill Creek Entertainment and Image Entertainment.

== Merchandise ==
A comedic paperback book titled Hey, Vern! It's the Ernest P. Worrell Book of Knowledge was published by Carden & Cherry in 1985, which was re-released with the title It's the Ernest P. Worrell Book of Knawledge [sic] in 1986. It was followed by the book Ask Ernest: What, When, Where, Why, Who Cares?, published by Rutledge Hill Press in 1993. Both books were designed as if Ernest had created his own homemade zine, featuring a varied collection of jokes, puns, musings, and art.

A 16-inch (41 cm) Ernest talking doll based on the TV series Hey Vern, It's Ernest! was produced by Kenner in 1989.

A video game titled Ernest Travels the World was announced for the Amiga in 1992. The game was planned to be a sidescroller following Ernest on an adventure across the continents to find Vern. The final level was an increasingly psychedelic experience similar to the Tek Matrix level of TekWar, ending with the revelation that Vern was simply a figment of Ernest's imagination all along. The game was cancelled before release due to declining Amiga sales.

== Legacy ==
In 2017, Montgomery Bell State Park employees Jackie Herald and Ranger Geoffrey Ransford approached the park's director about having an event to commemorate the 30th anniversary of the release of Ernest Goes to Camp. The director did not believe anyone would come, but Jackie and Geoff persuaded him until he reluctantly allowed it. With a crowd of a couple hundred people in its inaugural year, Montgomery Bell State Park in Burns, Tennessee, the primary filming location for Ernest Goes to Camp, has since hosted an annual "Ernest Day", primarily taking place on a Saturday in June (near Jim Varney's June 15th birthday), which has continued to grow in size each year.
