= Ernest Scared Stupid =

1991 film by John Cherry

- Theatrical release poster
- Directed by: John Cherry
- Screenplay by: Charlie Gale; Coke Sams
- Story by: John Cherry; Coke Sams
- Produced by: Stacy Williams
- Starring: Jim Varney
- Cinematography: Hanania Baer
- Edited by: Craig Bassett
- Music by: Bruce Arntson; Kirby Shelstad
- Production companies: Touchstone Pictures; Touchwood Pacific Partners I; Emshell Producers Group
- Distributed by: Buena Vista Pictures Distribution
- Release date: October 11, 1991
- Running time: 89 minutes
- Country: United States
- Language: English
- Budget: $9.6 million
- Box office: $14.1 million

Ernest Scared Stupid is a 1991 American comedy horror film directed by John Cherry. It stars Jim Varney and Eartha Kitt. It is the fifth film to feature the character Ernest P. Worrell, and the fourth film in the Ernest series, following Ernest Goes to Jail (1990). In the film, Ernest unwittingly unleashes an evil troll upon a small town on Halloween night and helps the local children fight back.

It was released on October 11, 1991, and grossed $14.1 million. It is the final "Ernest" film to be released by Touchstone Pictures, as part of a multi-picture deal. The next film in the series, Ernest Rides Again, was released in November 1993.

== Plot ==
In the late 19th century, the demonic troll Trantor transforms children into wooden dolls to feast upon their energy in Briarville, Missouri. The townsfolk capture him and seal him under an oak tree, with Rev. Phineas Worrell, the village minister and the ancestor of Ernest P. Worrell, establishing the seal. Trantor vengefully places a curse on the Worrell family, stating that he can only be released on October 30, the night before Halloween, by a Worrell. As part of the curse, every generation of Worrells will get "dumber and dumber and dumber", until the dumbest member of the family is foolish enough to set Trantor free.

One hundred years later, Ernest, a sanitation worker, helps a few of his middle school friends, Kenny Binder, Elizabeth and Joey, construct a treehouse in the same tree that unknowingly contains the dormant creature, after the mayor's sons demolished their own cardboard haunted house. When Old Lady Hackmore discovers this, she angrily leaves. Following her, Ernest learns the story of Trantor and idiotically reports it to the kids. Inadvertently, Ernest releases the troll.

Joey is walking home from the treehouse when he hears something rustling through the trees. Joey slowly walks and slips down in a muddy hole. Trantor grabs Joey's wrist and turns him into a wooden doll. Ernest finds Kenny's dad, Sheriff Cliff Binder, and explains the situation but Binder does not believe him. After none of the townsfolk will assist Ernest because of the upcoming Halloween party, he mounts a one-man (and one-dog) defense operation in preparation for Trantor's appearance. Meanwhile, Trantor captures a boy on a skateboard as his second victim.

Tom and Bobby Tulip, hoping to exploit Ernest, sell him various fake troll traps, but one backfires on the mayor's sons and Ernest loses his job. Ernest, Kenny and Elizabeth return to Hackmore, where they learn that only "the heart of a child, and a mother's care" can defeat the troll. Later that night, Trantor claims Elizabeth as his third victim as he sneaks into her house while she is resting on her bed.

While Kenny and his friend Gregg are walking, Trantor uses Elizabeth's voice to lure Kenny away, then takes Gregg as a fourth victim. Despite parents being upset at their missing children, Mayor Murdock and Sheriff Binder still proceed with a Halloween party at the school, believing the missing children will be there. Trantor appears there and takes the mayor's oldest son as his fifth and final wooden doll. In the ensuing fight between Trantor and Ernest, Trantor turns Ernest's dog Rimshot into a wooden doll before being repelled by soft-serve ice cream on Ernest's hands. Kenny realizes that "mother's care" refers to milk and rallies a troll-fighting team to destroy them.

Back at the treehouse, Trantor successfully summons his army of trolls while Ernest unsuccessfully tries to stop them. The townspeople show up, only for the trolls to overwhelm and beat them up. Kenny and his friends arrive and begin destroying the trolls with milk. During the fight, Trantor escapes beneath the tree where he summons the powers of the underworld, making him invincible, especially to milk. Enraged, Kenny unsuccessfully tries to destroy Trantor, who also turns Kenny into a doll. With the other townsfolk now backing him up and telling him to douse Trantor in milk, Ernest realizes that milk weakened the troll children, while unconditional love ("the heart of a child") would weaken Trantor himself. He takes Trantor and dances with him while the mob watches, overloading him with love, and finally kisses his snot-ridden nose, causing Trantor to explode.

With Trantor's destruction, Ernest is proclaimed a hero. Sheriff Binder apologizes to his son for doubting him and Ernest. All of the wooden dolls as well as Rimshot are restored, including those from the early 19th century, and everyone is reunited with their families.

== Cast ==
- Jim Varney as Ernest P. Worrell
- Eartha Kitt as Old Lady Hackmore
- Austin Nagler as Kenny
- Shay Astar as Elizabeth
- Jonas Moscartolo as Trantor the Troll
  - Ernie Fosselius as the voice
- John Cadenhead as Tom Tulip
- Bill Byrge as Bobby Tulip
- Larry Black as Mayor Murdock
- Richard Woolf as Matt
- Nick Victory as Mike
- Alec Klapper as Joey
- Daniel Butler as Cliff
- Esther Huston as Amanda

== Production ==
Like previous entries in the series, Ernest Scared Stupid was directed by John Cherry. He initially conceived a simple premise: Ernest trying to stop "a bad guy with a mission". He researched several types of antagonists in fiction, pondering who the "bad guy" would be, and became intrigued with trolls, leading to a Halloween Ernest film. A film named Ernest Scared Stiff was announced in two issues of Variety, published June 10 and July 22, 1991. Principal photography took place from May to July 1991 in Nashville, Tennessee. The June 10 issue also mentioned the final name, Ernest Scared Stupid.

== Release ==
Ernest Scared Stupid was released theatrically in the United States by Buena Vista Pictures Distribution on October 11, 1991. It is the fourth film in the Ernest series, and the final in a multi-picture deal with Touchstone Pictures, with future installments after Ernest Rides Again, released independently as direct-to-video.

== Reception ==
=== Critical response ===
On the review aggregator website Rotten Tomatoes, 27% of 11 critics' reviews are positive. Metacritic, which uses a weighted average, assigned the film a score of 38 out of 100, based on 5 critics, indicating "generally unfavorable" reviews.

=== Box office ===
The film placed fourth in its opening weekend, making $4.4 million from 1,782 theaters. It grossed a total of $14.1 million in the United States.

== Home media ==
The film had its first DVD release from Touchstone Home Entertainment on September 3, 2002. Mill Creek Entertainment re-released it on DVD on January 18, 2011, as part of the two-disc set Ernest Triple Feature, along with Ernest Goes to Camp and Ernest Goes to Jail.

== See also ==
- List of films set around Halloween
