= List of films: E =

indexed lists of films
0–9	A	B	C	D	E	F
G	H	I	J–K	L	M	N–O
P	Q–R	S	T	U–V–W	X–Y–Z	

This is an alphabetical list of film articles (or sections within articles about films). It includes made for television films. See the talk page for the method of indexing used.

== E ==
- E: (2006 & 2017)
- E.A. — Extraordinary Accident (1958)
- E.T. the Extra-Terrestrial (1982)

=== Ea ===
==== Eac–Eam ====
- Each Dawn I Die (1939)
- Each Heart Has Its Own Story (1948)
- Each Pearl a Tear (1916)
- Each Time I Kill (2007)
- Each Time We Part Away (1994)
- Each to His Kind (1917)
- Each to His Own Way (1948)
- Eadie Was a Lady (1945)
- Eadweard (2015)
- Eager Bodies (2003)
- Eager Lips (1927)
- Eager to Live (1953)
- Eagle (1990)
- Eagle (2024)
- The Eagle (1918)
- The Eagle (1925)
- The Eagle (1959)
- The Eagle (2011)
- Eagle in a Cage (1971)
- Eagle Eye (2008)
- Eagle Flute (2009)
- The Eagle Has Landed (1976)
- The Eagle Huntress (2016)
- Eagle of the Night (1928)
- Eagle of the Pacific (1953)
- The Eagle of the Sea (1926)
- Eagle vs Shark (2007)
- Eagle Squadron (1942)
- Eagle Wings (2021)
- Eagle's Claw (1978)
- The Eagle's Talons (1923)
- Eagle's Wing (1979)
- Eagles (1984)
- Eagles (2012)
- Eagles Fly Early (1966)
- Eagles Over London (1969)
- Eagles of the Republic (2025)
- Eaglets (1935)
- Eaglets (1944)
- Eain Met Nat Thamee (2004)
- Eain Met Yar Thi (2001)
- Eakantham (2006)
- Ealing Comedy 2008)
- Eames: The Architect and the Painter (2011)

==== Ear ====
- The Ear (1990)
- Ear for Eye (2021)
- Earl Carroll Vanities (1945)
- The Earl of Chicago (1940)
- Early to Bed: (1928, 1933, 1936 & 1941)
- Early Frost (1982)
- Early Joys (1956)
- Early Man (2018)
- Early One Morning (2011)
- Early Snow in Munich (1984)
- Early Spring: (1956 & 1986)
- Early Summer (1951)
- Early to Wed (1926)
- Early Winter (2015)
- Early Works (1969)
- The Earrings of Madame de… (1953)
- Ears (2016)
- Earth: (1930, 1947, 1957, 1996, 1998 & 2007)
- Earth and Ashes (2004)
- Earth and Blood (2020)
- The Earth Is Blue as an Orange (2020)
- Earth Days (2009)
- Earth to Echo (2014)
- Earth vs. the Flying Saucers (1956)
- Earth Girls Are Easy (1988)
- The Earth Is a Sinful Song (1973)
- Earth Made of Glass (2010)
- Earth Mama (2023)
- Earth vs. the Spider: (1958 & 2001 TV)
- Earth Spirit (1923)
- Earth Star Voyager (1988 TV)
- Earth's Man (1917)
- Earth's Skin (2004)
- Earthbound: (1920, 1940 & 1981)
- Earthquake: (1974 & 2016)
- Earthquake Bird (2019)
- Earthquake in Chile (1975 TV)
- Earthquake in New York (1998 TV)
- Earthling (2010)
- Earthlings (2005)
- Earthly Love (1974)
- Earthly Possessions (1999 TV)
- Earthrise (2018)
- Earthworm Tractors (1936)
- Earwig and the Witch (2020)

==== Eas ====
- The East: (2013 & 2020)
- East of Borneo (1931)
- East of Broadway (1924)
- East Is East: (1916 & 1999)
- East of Eden (1955)
- East of Elephant Rock (1977)
- East of Fifth Avenue (1933)
- East Germany (2023)
- East of Havana (2006)
- East of Hope Street (1998)
- East Lynne: (1913, 1916, 1921, 1922, 1925 & 1931)
- East Meets West: (1936, 1995 & 2011)
- East of the Mountains (2021)
- East Palace, West Palace (1996)
- East of Piccadilly (1941)
- The East Is Red: (1965 & 1993)
- East River (2008)
- East of the River (1940)
- East of Shanghai (1931)
- East Side Kids (1940)
- East Side Story: (1997 & 2006)
- East of Sudan (1964)
- East of Suez (1925)
- East of Sumatra (1953)
- East of Wall (2025)
- East, West, East: The Final Sprint (2009)
- Easter (2002)
- Easter Bunny, Kill! Kill! (2006)
- Easter Parade (1948)
- Easter Sunday (2022)
- Easter Yeggs (1947)
- Eastern Condors (1987)
- Eastern Promises (2007)
- An Eastern Westerner (1920)
- Easy: (2003 & 2017)
- Easy! (2011)
- Easy A (2010)
- Easy Come, Easy Go: (1928, 1947 & 1967)
- Easy, Down There! (1971)
- An Easy Girl (2019)
- An Easy Life (1964)
- Easy Living: (1937, 1949 & 2017)
- Easy Money: (1917, 1925, 1934, 1936, 1948, 1983 & 2010)
- Easy Rider (1969)
- Easy Street (1917)
- Easy Virtue: (1928 & 2008)
- Easy's Waltz (2025)

==== Eat–Eaz ====
- Eat (1963)
- Eat a Bowl of Tea (1989)
- Eat, Brains, Love (2019)
- Eat Drink Man Woman (1994)
- Eat Hot Tofu Slowly (2005)
- Eat Locals (2017)
- Eat Me!: (2000 & 2009)
- Eat My Dust! (1976)
- Eat the Night (2024)
- Eat the Peach (1986)
- Eat Pray Love (2010)
- Eat the Rich (1987)
- Eat and Run (1986)
- Eat Sleep Die (2012)
- Eat That Question: Frank Zappa in His Own Words (2016)
- Eat Wheaties! (2020)
- Eat With Me (2014)
- Eat Your Heart Out (1997)
- Eat Your Makeup (1968)
- Eaten Alive (1976)
- Eaten Alive! (1980)
- Eaten by Lions (2019)
- Eating (1990)
- Eating Air (1999)
- Eating Miss Campbell (2022)
- Eating Our Way to Extinction (2021)
- Eating Out series:
  - Eating Out (2004)
  - Eating Out 2: Sloppy Seconds (2006)
  - Eating Out: All You Can Eat (2009)
  - Eating Out: Drama Camp (2011)
  - Eating Out: The Open Weekend (2011)
- Eating Raoul (1982)
- Eating Too Fast (1966)
- Eating You Alive (2018)
- Eaux d'artifice (1953)
- Eaux profondes (1981)
- The Eavesdropper (1964)
- Eazhaiyin Sirippil (2000)

=== Eb–Ec ===
- Ebb Tide: (1922, 1932 & 1937)
- Ebba the Movie (1982)
- Ebenezer: (1998 TV & 2026)
- Ebola Syndrome (1996)
- Ebony, Ivory & Jade (1976)
- Ebony Parade (1947)
- Ecce bombo (1978)
- Eccentricities of a Blonde-Haired Girl (2009)
- Ecco fatto (1998)
- Ecco noi per esempio (1977)
- Echelon Conspiracy (1962)
- Echo: (1997 TV, 2001, 2003, 2007, 2019 & 2023)
- The Echo: (1915, 2008 & 2023)
- Echo of Barbara (1960)
- Echo Boomers (2020)
- Echo in the Canyon (2018)
- Echo to Delta (2023)
- Echo of Diana (1963)
- Echo of a Dream (1930)
- Echo of the Mountain (2014)
- The Echo Murders (1945)
- Echo Park: (1986 & 2014)
- The Echo of Thunder (1998) (TV)
- Echo Valley (2025)
- The Echo of Youth (1919)
- Echoes (2014)
- Echoes from a Ghost Minyan (1998)
- Echoes of Innocence (2005)
- Echoes of Motherhood (2025)
- Echoes of Paradise (1987)
- Echoes of the Past (2021)
- Echoes of the Rainbow (2010)
- Echoes from a Sombre Empire (1990)
- Echoes of a Summer (1976)
- Echoes of War (2015)
- Echoing Love (2011)
- Ecija's Seven Children (1947)
- Eclipse: (1934 & 1994)
- The Eclipse (2009)
- Eclipse de sol (1943)
- Eclipse of Reason (1987)
- Eco-Pirate: The Story of Paul Watson (2011)
- Ecstasy (1933)

=== Ed ===
- Ed (1996)
- Ed, Edd n Eddy's Big Picture Show (2009 TV)
- Ed Gein: The Butcher of Plainfield (2007)
- Ed Gein, the Musical (2010)
- Ed and His Dead Mother (1993)
- Ed Wood (1994)
- Ed's Next Move (1996)

==== Eda–Edw ====
- Edagaiye Apaghatakke Karana (2025)
- Edaina Jaragocchu (2019)
- Edakallu Guddada Mele (1973)
- Edakkad Battalion 06 (2019)
- Edavappathy (2016)
- Edavazhiyile Poocha Minda Poocha (1979)
- Eddie (1996)
- Eddie and the Cruisers (1983)
- Eddie and the Cruisers II: Eddie Lives! (1989)
- Eddie the Eagle (2015)
- Eddie Macon's Run (1983)
- Eddie Murphy Delirious (1983)
- Eddie Murphy Raw (1987)
- Eddie Reynolds y los ángeles de acero (2014)
- Eddie: Strongman (2015)
- Eddie og Suzanne (1975)
- Eddie's Million Dollar Cook-Off (2003) (TV)
- Eddington (2025)
- Eddy (2014)
- The Eddy Duchin Story (1956)
- Eddy Merckx in the Vicinity of a Cup of Coffee (1973)
- Eddy Polo in the Wasp's Nest (1928)
- Edegarike (2012)
- Edelweiss Pirates (2004)
- Eden: (2001, 2006, 2012, 2014, 2015, 2019 & 2024)
- Eden and After (1970)
- Eden Lake (2008)
- Eden Log (2007)
- Eden and Return (1921)
- Eden Valley (1994)
- Edgar Allen Poe (1909)
- The Edge: (1997 & 2010)
- Edge City (1998)
- Edge of the City (1957)
- Edge of Darkness: (1943 & 2010)
- Edge of Doom (1950)
- The Edge of Heaven (2007)
- Edge of Innocence (2016)
- The Edge of Love (2008)
- Edge O' Beyond (1919)
- Edge of Seventeen (1998)
- Edges of the Lord (2000)
- Edge of Tomorrow (2014)
- Edhathuru (2004)
- Edhi Edhi Hoadheemey (2003)
- Edhir Neechal (1968)
- Edhir Paradhathu (1954)
- Edhonveli Thundi (2007/2008)
- Edhuvas Hingajje (1996)
- Edhuvum Nadakkum (2009)
- Edi (2002)
- Edi Dharmam Edi Nyayam? (1982)
- Edición extra (1949)
- Edie (2017)
- Edie & Thea: A Very Long Engagement (2009)
- Edison (2005)
- Edison Bugg's Invention (1916)
- Edison and Leo (2008)
- Edison, the Man (1940)
- Edison, Marconi & Co. (1928)
- Edith+Eddie (2017)
- Edith's Diary (1983)
- Edmond (2005)
- Edo Maajka – Sevdah o Rodama (2007)
- EDtv (1999)
- Educated Evans (1936)
- Educated Fish (1937)
- Educating Father (1936)
- Educating My Father (1953)
- Educating Niní (1940)
- Educating Peter (1992)
- Educating Rita (1983)
- An Education (2009)
- The Education of Charlie Banks (2007)
- Education of a Prince: (1927 & 1938)
- The Edukators (2004)
- Eduppar Kai Pillai (1975)
- Edureeta (1977)
- Edurinti Mogudu Pakkinti Pellam (1991)
- Edurmaneli Ganda Pakkadmaneli Hendthi (1992)
- Eduruleni Alexander (2014)
- Eduruleni Manishi: (1975 & 2001)
- Edvard Munch (1953)
- Edward II (1991)
- Edward Scissorhands (1990)
- Edward, My Son (1949)
- Edwin (1984)

=== Ee ===
- Ee Abbai Chala Manchodu (2003)
- Ee Adutha Kaalathu (2012)
- Ee Bandha Anubandha (1987)
- Ee Bandhana (2007)
- Ee Bhoomi Aa Bhanu (2013)
- Ee Dil Helide Nee Bekantha (2014)
- Ee Ganam Marakkumo (1978)
- Ee Jeeva Ninagagi (1986)
- Ee Kaikalil (1986)
- Ee Kanni Koodi (1990)
- Ee Lokam Evide Kure Manushyar (1985)
- Ee.Ma.Yau. (2018)
- Ee Maaya Peremito (2018)
- Ee Manohara Theeram (1978)
- Ee Nadu (1982)
- Ee Nagaraniki Emaindhi (2018)
- Ee Parakkum Thalika (2001)
- Ee Pattanathil Bhootham (2009)
- Ee Preethi Yeke Bhoomi Melide (2007)
- Ee Puzhayum Kadannu (1996)
- Ee Rajeev Gandhi Alla (2007)
- Ee Rojullo (2012)
- Ee Sabdam Innathe Sabdam (1985)
- Ee Sambhashane (2009)
- Ee Sanje (2011)
- Ee Snehatheerathu (2004)
- Ee Thalamura Ingane (1985)
- Ee Thanalil Ithiri Nerum (1985)
- Ee Thanutha Veluppan Kalathu (1990)
- Ee Thirakkinidayil (2012)
- Ee Varsham Sakshiga (2014)
- Ee Vazhi Mathram (1983)
- Ee Yugam (1983)

==== Eeb–Eew ====
- Eeb Allay Ooo! (2019)
- Eeda (2018)
- Eedo Rakam Aado Rakam (2016)
- Eedu Gold Ehe (2016)
- Eedu Jodu (1963)
- Eega (2012)
- Eegah (1962)
- The Eel (1997)
- Eel Girl (2008)
- Een Jongmensch... (1907)
- Eena Meena Deeka (1994)
- Eenam (1983)
- Eenam Thettatha Kattaru (1989)
- Eenie Meanie (2025)
- Eephus (2024)
- Eera Nilam (2003)
- Eera Veyyil (2014)
- Eera Vizhi Kaaviyangal (1982)
- Eeram (2009)
- Eeramana Rojave (1991)
- Eeran Sandhya (1985)
- Eerie (2018)
- The Eerie Midnight Horror Show (1974)
- Eesaraina (2024)
- Eesho (2022)
- Eeshwar (1989)
- Eeswar (2002)
- Eeswaran (2021)
- Eettappuli (1983)
- Eetti: (1985 & 2015)
- Eettillam (1983)
- Eewai (2022)

=== Ef–Ej ===
- Efectos secundarios (2006)
- The Effect of Gamma Rays on Man-in-the-Moon Marigolds (1972)
- Effects (1979)
- Effi Briest: (1971, 1974 & 2009)
- Effie Gray (2014)
- Effigy: Poison and the City (2019)
- Egg: (2007 & 2018)
- Egg! Egg! A Hardboiled Story (1975)
- The Egg and I (1947)
- Eggs (1995)
- Eggs Over Easy: Black Women & Fertility (2022 TV)
- Eggshells (1969)
- Ego: (2013, 2018 & 2021)
- Ego: The Michael Gudinski Story (2023)
- Egon Schiele: Death and the Maiden (2016)
- The Egyptian (1954)
- Eh Janam Tumhare Lekhe (2015)
- Eh, Kasi Bata (1992)
- Ehrengard: The Art of Seduction (2023)
- Ei Actor Natte (2019)
- Ei Ami Renu (2021)
- Ei Desh Tomar Amar (1959)
- Ei Ghor Ei Songsar (1996)
- Ei Lu Baung Twin (1958)
- Ei Raat Tomar Amaar (2025)
- Eidetic (2016)
- Eien no 1/2 (1987)
- Eierdiebe (2003)
- Eiffel (2021)
- Eiga ST Aka to Shirō no Sōsa File (2015)
- The Eiger Sanction (1975)
- Eight Below (2006)
- Eight Crazy Nights (2002)
- Eight Days a Week (1998)
- Eight Deadly Shots (1972)
- The Eight Diagram Pole Fighter (1984)
- Eight Iron Men (1952)
- Eight Legged Freaks (2002)
- Eight Men Out (1988)
- Eight for Silver (2021)
- Eight Thousand Li of Cloud and Moon (1947)
- The Eighth Day (1997)
- Eighth Grade (2018)
- The Eighth House (2014)
- Eijanaika (1981)
- Eileen (2023)
- Einstein (2008) (TV)
- Einstein and Eddington (2008) (TV)
- Der Einstein des Sex (1999)
- The Einstein Theory of Relativity (1923)
- Ejecta (2014)
- Ejen Ali: The Movie (2019)

=== Ek ===
- Ek Adbhut Dakshina Guru Dakshina (2015)
- Ek Ajnabee (2005)
- Ek Alag Mausam (2003)
- Ek Aur Ek Gyarah (2003)
- Ek Baar Kaho (1980)
- Ek Baar Phir (1979)
- Ek Bechara (1972)
- Ek Chadar Maili Si (1986)
- Ek Chalis Ki Last Local (2007)
- Ek Chatur Naar (2025)
- Ek Chhotisi Love Story (2002)
- Ek Chitthi Pyar Bhari (1985)
- Ek Chup (2022)
- Ek Cup Cha (2014)
- Ek Cup Chya (2009)
- Ek Daav Bhutacha (1982)
- Ek Daav Dhobi Pachhad (2009)
- Ek Deewana Tha (2013)
- Ek Deewane Ki Deewaniyat (2025)
- Ek Dil Sau Afsane (1963)
- Ek Din 24 Ghante (2003)
- Ek Din Achanak (1989)
- Ek Din Bahu Ka (1982)
- Ek Din Ka Sultan (1945)
- Ek Din Pratidin (1979)
- Ek Do Teen (1953)
- Ek Doctor Ki Maut (1990)
- Ek Duuje Ke Liye (1981)
- Ek Gunah Aur Sahi (1980)
- Ek Haseena Thi Ek Deewana Tha (2017)
- Ek Hasina Do Diwane (1972)
- Ek Hasina Thi (2004)
- Ek Hazarachi Note (2014)
- Ek Hi Bhool: (1940 & 1981)
- Ek Hi Maqsad (1988)
- Ek Hi Raasta: (1939, 1956, 1977 & 1993)
- Ek Hota Vidushak (1992)
- Ek Je Aachhe Kanya (2001)
- Ek Je Chhilo Raja (2018)
- Ek Jind Ek Jaan (2006)
- Ek Khiladi Ek Haseena (2005)
- Ek Ladka Ek Ladki (1992)
- Ek Ladki Ko Dekha Toh Aisa Laga (2019)
- Ek Love Ya (2022)
- Ek Mahal Ho Sapno Ka (1975)
- Ek Main Aur Ek Tu (1986)
- Ek Main Aur Ekk Tu (2012)
- Ek Mini Katha (2021)
- Ek Misaal (1986)
- Ek Mon Ek Pran (2012)
- Ek Musafir Ek Hasina (1962)
- Ek Mutho Chabi (2005)
- Ek Nadir Galpo: Tale of a River (2008)
- Ek Nai Paheli (1984)
- Ek Nari Ek Brahmachari (1971)
- Ek Naya Rishta (1988)
- Ek Niranjan (2009)
- Ek Paheli Leela (2015)
- Ek Phaali Rodh (2014)
- Ek Phool Do Mali (1969)
- Ek Radha Ek Meera (2025)
- Ek Rishtaa: The Bond of Love (2001)
- Ek Saal (1957)
- Ek Tara (2015)
- Ek Tera Saath (2016)
- Ek Tha Tiger (2012)
- Ek Thi Daayan (2013)
- Ek Tukro Chand (2001)
- Ek Villain (2015)
- Ek Villain Returns (2022)
- Ek Vivaah... Aisa Bhi (2008)
- Ek: The Power of One (2009)

==== Eka–Ekv ====
- Eka Dawasaka Api (2018)
- Eka Gei Sokari (2020)
- Eka Renaka Kurullo (2019)
- Ekalayvan (1993)
- Ekaloveyudu (2008)
- Ekam: Son of Soil (2010)
- Ekamath Eka Rateka (2009)
- Ekambavanan (1947)
- Ekangi (2002)
- Ekannoborti (2021)
- Ekattorer Jishu (1993)
- Ekbar Bolo Bhalobashi (2011)
- Ekda Kaay Zala (2022)
- Ekda Yeun Tar Bagha (2023)
- Ekdam Kadak (2022)
- Ekee Britte (2013)
- Ekenbabu series:
  - The Eken (2022)
  - The Eken: Ruddhaswas Rajasthan (2023)
  - The Eken: Benaras e Bibhishika (2025)
- Ekeino to kalokairi (1971)
- Ekhon Nedekha Nodir Xhipare (2012)
- Ekhoni (1971)
- Ekhrajiha (2007)
- Ekiben (1999)
- Ekjon Jhumur (2002)
- Ekk Albela (2016)
- Ekk Deewana Tha (2012)
- Ekk Thee Sanam (2013)
- Ekka (2025)
- Ekka Raja Rani (1994)
- Ekka Saka (2015)
- Ekkadiki Pothavu Chinnavada (2016)
- Ekla Akash (2012)
- Ekla Cholo (2015 TV)
- Eklavya: The Royal Guard (2007)
- Eko (2025)
- Eko Eko Azarak: Wizard of Darkness (1995)
- Ekram (2018)
- Ekta (1942)
- Ekta Jeev Sadashiv (1972)
- Ekti Nadir Naam (2003)
- Ekti Raat (1956)
- Ektu Sore Bosun (2023)
- Ekulti Ek (2013)
- Ekvtime: Man of God (2018)

=== El ===
- Él (1953)

==== Ela–Eld ====
- Ela Veezha Poonchira (2022)
- Elaan (1947)
- Elaan (1971)
- Elaan (1994)
- Elaan (2005)
- Elaan-E-Jung (1989)
- Elae Airy in Busan (2026)
- Elaine Stritch: Shoot Me (2013)
- Elanne Starlight (2016)
- Elar Char Adhyay (2012)
- An Elastic Affair (1930)
- Elbow (2024)
- Elcano & Magellan: The First Voyage Around the World (2019)
- Elden Ring (2028)
- Elckerlyc (1975)
- Eldorado (1988)
- Eldorado (1995)
- Eldorado (2008)
- Eldorado (2012)
- Eldorado (2018)
- Eldorado: Everything the Nazis Hate (2023)

==== Ele ====
- Ele, My Friend (1992)
- Eleanor the Great (2025)
- Eleanor's Secret (2009)
- Election: (1999, 2005, 2013 & 2024)
- Election 2 (2006)
- Election Day: (1929 & 2007)
- Election Daze (1943)
- Election Night (1998)
- Elective Affinities (1974)
- The Elective Affinities (1996)
- Electra: (1962, 2023 & 2024)
- Electra Glide in Blue (1973)
- Electra, My Love (1974)
- Electric Apricot: Quest for Festeroo (2007)
- Electric Boogaloo: The Wild, Untold Story of Cannon Films (2014)
- Electric Dragon 80.000 V (2001)
- Electric Dreams (1984)
- The Electric Horseman (1979)
- The Electric House (1922)
- Electric Jesus (2020)
- The Electric Kool-Aid Acid Test (2009)
- Electric Moon (1992)
- Electric Shadows (2004)
- Electric Slide (2014)
- The Electric State (2025)
- The Electrical Life of Louis Wain (2021)
- Electricity (2014)
- Electroboy (2014)
- Electronic Labyrinth: THX 1138 4EB (1967)
- Eleftherios Venizelos (1980)
- Elegy (2008)
- Elegy of the North (1957)
- Elegy of Ren (1969)
- Elektra: (2005 & 2010)
- Elektra Luxx (2010)
- The Element of Crime (1984)
- Element of Doubt (1996 TV)
- Elemental (2012)
- Elemental (2023)
- Elena: (2011 & 2012)
- Elena and Her Men (1956)
- Elena and the Secret of Avalor (2016)
- Eleni (1985)
- The Eleanor Roosevelt Story (1965)
- Eleonora Duse (1947)
- Elephant: (1989, 1993, 2003, 2019 & 2020)
- Elephant Boy (1937)
- An Elephant Called Slowly (1969)
- Elephant Fury (1953)
- An Elephant on His Hands (1913)
- The Elephant Man (1980)
- An Elephant Never Forgets (1935)
- Elephant in the Room (2016)
- An Elephant Sitting Still (2018)
- Elephant Song (2014)
- Elephant Walk (1954)
- Elephant White (2011)
- Elephants Dream (2006)
- Elephants and Grass (2001)
- Elesin Oba: The King's Horseman (2022)
- Elevated (1997)
- Elevation (2024)
- Elevator: (1995, 2008, 2011 & 2018)
- The Elevator (1974)
- Elevator Baby (2019)
- Elevator to the Gallows (1958)
- Elevator Game (2023)
- Eleven (2025)
- Eleven Days, Eleven Nights (1987)
- Eleven Days in May (2022)
- Eleven Hopes (1975)
- Eleven Males (2017)
- Eleven Males 2 (2019)
- Eleven Men and a Ball (1948)
- Eleven Men Out (2005)
- Eleven Pairs of Boots (1954)
- Eleven Samurai (1967)
- Eleven Silent Men (2022)
- Eleven Years and One Day (1963)
- Eleventh Hour: (1942 animated & 1942 documentary)
- Eleventh Mom (2007)

==== Elf–Eli ====
- Elf (2003)
- Elf Bowling (2007)
- Elf Jahre alt (1966)
- Elf Me (2023)
- Elf-Man (2012)
- Elfie Hopkins (2012)
- Elgar (1962 TV)
- Elgar: Fantasy on a Composer on a Bicycle (2002 TV)
- Elham (2023)
- Eli: (2015 & 2019)
- Elián (2017)
- Elijah: (2007 TV & 2024)
- Eliminators: (1986 & 2016)
- Elina: As If I Wasn't There (2002)
- Eline Vere (1991)
- Elio (2025)
- Elipsis (2006)
- Elisa (2025)
- Elisa Before the End of the World (1997)
- Elisa & Marcela (2019)
- Elisa, vida mía (1977)
- Elisabeth and the Fool (1934)
- Elise, or Real Life (1970)
- Elite Squad (2007)
- Elite Squad: The Enemy Within (2010)
- Eliza Comes to Stay (1936)
- Eliza Fraser (1976)
- Elizabeth (1998)
- Elizabeth Harvest (2018)
- Elizabeth: The Golden Age (2007)
- Elizabeth Taylor: The Lost Tapes (2024)
- Elizabethan Express (1954)
- Elizabethtown (2005)

==== Ell ====
- Ella (2024)
- Ella Bella Bingo (2020)
- Ella Cinders (1926)
- Ella Enchanted (2004)
- Ella, él y sus millones (1944)
- Ellaam Mela Irukuravan Paathuppan (2023)
- Ellaam Ninakku Vendi (1981)
- Ellaichami (1992)
- Ellam Avan Seyal (2008)
- Ellam Chettante Ishtam Pole (2015)
- Ellam Inba Mayam (1955)
- Ellam Inba Mayyam (1981)
- Ellam Sheriyakum (2021)
- Ellam Un Kairasi (1980)
- Ellam Unakkaga (1961)
- Ellame En Pondattithaan (1998)
- Ellame En Rasathan (1995)
- Elle (2016)
- Elle boit pas, elle fume pas, elle drague pas, mais... elle cause ! (1970)
- Elle: A Modern Cinderella Tale (2010)
- Ellen: The Ellen Pakkies Story (2018)
- Elles (2011)
- Ellie (1984)
- Elling (2001)
- Ellipsis (2024)
- Ellis Island (1936)
- Ellos nos hicieron así (1952)

==== Elm–Ely ====
- Elmer Elephant (1936)
- Elmer and Elsie (1934)
- Elmer Gantry (1960)
- Elmer, the Great (1933)
- Elmer's Candid Camera (1940)
- Elmer's Pet Rabbit (1941)
- Elmina (2010)
- Elmo the Fearless (1920)
- Elmo the Mighty (1919)
- Eloisa Is Under an Almond Tree (1943)
- Eloise series:
  - Eloise at the Plaza (2003) (TV)
  - Eloise at Christmastime (2003) (TV)
  - Eloise (TBD)
- Eloy (1969)
- Elsa & Fred: (2005 & 2014)
- Elsewhere: (2001, 2009 & 2019)
- Elsewhere at Night (2025)
- Elsinore (2026)
- Elsk meg i morgen (2005)
- Elstree 1976 (2015)
- The Elstree Story (1952)
- Elves (1989)
- Elvira Fernández, vendedora de tiendas (1942)
- Elvira's Haunted Hills (2001)
- Elvira, Mistress of the Dark (1988)
- Elvis: (1979 TV & 2022)
- Elvis and Anabelle (2007)
- Elvis Has Left the Building (2004)
- Elvis: That's the Way it Is (1970)
- Elway to Marino (2013 TV)
- Elyse (2020)
- Elysium (2013)

=== Em ===
- Em Busca de Iara (2013)
- Em Câmara Lenta (2012)
- Em Magan (2006)

==== Ema–Emo ====
- Ema (2019)
- Ema Nudar Umanu (2018)
- Emakku Thozhil Romance (2024)
- Emancipation: (2011 & 2022)
- Emanuel (2019)
- Emanuelle in America (1977)
- Emanuelle Around the World (1977)
- Emanuelle in Bangkok (1976)
- Emanuelle and the Last Cannibals (1984)
- Emanuelle and the White Slave Trade (1978)
- Emanuelle's Revenge (1975)
- The Embalmer: (1965 & 2002)
- Embargo (2010)
- Embarrassing Moments: (1930 & 1934)
- The Embarrassment of Riches (1918)
- Embassy (1972)
- Embattled (2020)
- Embedded (2016)
- Ember (2016)
- Embers: (1916, 1983 & 2015)
- Embodiment of Evil (2008)
- Embrace (2016)
- Embrace Again (2021)
- Embrace of the Serpent (2015)
- Embrace of the Vampire: (1995 & 2013)
- Embraceable You (1948)
- Embrujada (1969)
- Embrujo antillano (1947)
- Embrujo en Cerros Blancos (1955)
- Embryo (1976)
- Emelie (2015)
- Emerald City (1988)
- Emerald of the East (1929)
- The Emerald Forest (1985)
- Emergency: (1962, 2022 & 2025)
- Emergency Act 19 (2002)
- Emergency Call: (1933 & 1952)
- Emergency Declaration (2021)
- Emergency Hospital (1956)
- Emergency Landing: (1941, 1952 & 2023)
- Emergency Situation (2022)
- Emergency Squad: (1940 & 1974)
- Emergency Ward (1952)
- Emergency Wedding (1950)
- Emerging (1985 TV)
- The Emigrant: (1940 & 1994)
- The Emigrants (1971)
- Emil and the Detectives: (1931, 1935, 1954, 1964 & 2001)
- Emil i Lönnebarga (1971)
- Emil and the Piglet (1973)
- Emil's Mischiefs (1985 TV)
- Emile (2003)
- Emile the African (1949)
- Emile's Boat (1962)
- Emilia Galotti (1958)
- Emiliano Zapata (1970)
- Emilie Högquist (1939)
- Emilio (2008)
- Emily: (1976 & 2022)
- Emily Brontë's Wuthering Heights (1992)
- Emily the Criminal (2022)
- Emily & Tim (2015)
- Eminence Hill (2019)
- Eminent Domain (1990)
- Emir (2010)
- Emiti Bi Prema Hue (2012)
- Emma: (1932, 1972 TV, 1996, 1996 TV, 2016 & 2020)
- Emma Hamilton (1968)
- Emmanuelle (1974)
- Emmanuelle 2 (1975)
- Emmet Otter's Jug-Band Christmas (1977 TV)
- Emo the Musical (2016)
- The Emoji Movie (2017)
- Emotion Is Dead (2023)
- Emotional Backgammon (2003)

==== Emp ====
- Emperor: (2012 & 2020)
- The Emperor (1967)
- The Emperor and the Assassin (1998)
- The Emperor in August (2015)
- The Emperor of Capri (1949)
- Emperor Charles (1921)
- The Emperor and the Golem (1952)
- The Emperor and His Brother (1981)
- The Emperor Jones: (1933 & 1955 TV)
- Emperor of the North Pole (1973)
- The Emperor of Paris (2018)
- The Emperor of Portugallia (1944)
- The Emperor Waltz: (1948 & 1953)
- Emperor's Ball (1956)
- The Emperor's Candlesticks: (1936 & 1937)
- The Emperor's Club (2002)
- Emperor's Dream (1947)
- Emperor's Holidays (2015)
- The Emperor's Naked Army Marches On (1987)
- The Emperor's New Clothes: (1961, 1966, 2001 & 2015)
- The Emperor's New Groove (2000)
- The Emperor's Nightingale (1949)
- The Emperor's Old Clothes (1923)
- The Emperor's Secret (2006)
- The Emperor's Shadow (1996)
- The Emperor's Sweetheart (1931)
- The Emperor's Waltz (1933)
- Empire: (1965, 1986, 2002, 2005 TV & 2023)
- The Empire (2024)
- The Empire in Africa (2006)
- Empire of the Ants (1977)
- The Empire Builders (1924)
- Empire City (TBA)
- The Empire of Corpses (2015)
- Empire of the Dark (1991)
- The Empire of Diamonds (1920)
- Empire of Dirt (2013)
- The Empire of Dracula (1967)
- Empire of Dreams: The Story of the Star Wars Trilogy (2004)
- Empire of Dust (2011)
- Empire Falls (2005 TV)
- Empire of Light (2022)
- Empire of Lust (2015)
- Empire North (2010)
- Empire of Passion (1978)
- Empire Records (1995)
- Empire of Silver (2009)
- Empire State: (1987 & 2013)
- The Empire Strikes Back (1980)
- Empire of the Sun (1987)
- Empire V (2023)
- Empire of the Wolves (2005)
- Empires of the Deep (unreleased)
- Employee of the Month: (2004 & 2006)
- Empowered (2018)
- Empress Chung (2005)
- Empress Wu Tse-Tien (1963)
- Emptiness (2020)
- Empty (2006)
- Empty Cradle (1993 TV)
- Empty Days (1999)
- Empty Eyes: (1953 & 2001)
- Empty Hands (1924)
- Empty Hearts (1924)
- Empty Holsters (1937)
- The Empty Man (2020)
- Empty Nest (2008)
- Empty Pockets (1918)
- Empty Saddles (1936)
- Empty Socks (1927)

=== En ===
- En 6 Vaathiyaar Kaalpanthatta Kuzhu (2023)
- En Aaloda Seruppa Kaanom (2017)
- En Aasai Machan (1994)
- En Aasai Rasave (1998)
- En Aasai Thangachi (1996)
- En Aasai Unnoduthan (1983)
- En Annan (1970)
- En Bommukutty Ammavukku (1988)
- En carne viva (1954)
- En Jeevan Paduthu (1988)
- En Kaadhali Scene Podura (2019)
- En Kadamai (1964)
- En Kadhal Kanmani (1990)
- En Kadhale (2025)
- En Kanavar (1948)
- En Kelvikku Enna Bathil (1978)
- En Magal (1954)
- En Magan: (1945 & 1974)
- En Mana Vaanil (2002)
- En Manaivi (1942)
- En Pondatti Nallava (1995)
- En Pottukku Sonthakkaran (1991)
- En Purushan Kuzhandhai Maadhiri (2001)
- En Purushanthaan Enakku Mattumthaan (1989)
- En Rajangam (1994)
- En Rasavin Manasile (1991)
- En Rathathin Rathame (1989)
- En Route (2004)
- En Sakhiye (2000)
- En Swasa Kaatre (1999)
- En Thambi (1968)
- En Thamizh En Makkal (1988)
- En Thangachi Padichava (1988)

==== Ena ====
- Ena Exypno Exypno Moutro (1965)
- Ena votsalo sti limni (1955)
- Enai Noki Paayum Thota (2019)
- Enaini Panjari (1995)
- Enakkaga Kaathiru (1981)
- Enakkoru Magan Pirappan (1996)
- Enakku 20 Unakku 18 (2004)
- Enakku Innoru Per Irukku (2016)
- Enakku Nane Needipathi (1986)
- Enakku Vaaitha Adimaigal (2017)
- Enakku Veru Engum Kilaigal Kidayathu (2016)
- Enakkul Oruvan (1984)
- Enakkul Oruvan (2015)
- Enakta Leiringei (2017)
- Enaku Endey Kidaiyaathu (2023)
- Enamorada (1946)
- Enas delikanis (1963)

==== Enb–Enc ====
- Enbathettu (2017)
- Encanto (2021)
- Enchanted (2007)
- The Enchanted (2023)
- Enchanted April: (1935 & 1991)
- The Enchanted Barn (1919)
- The Enchanted Boy (1955)
- The Enchanted Cottage: (1924 & 1945)
- The Enchanted Drawing (1900)
- The Enchanted Hill (1926)
- Enchanting Island (1958)
- Enchanted Journey (1981)
- The Enchanted Sedan Chair (1905)
- The Enchanted Valley (1948)
- Enchanted Walk (1954)
- The Enchanted Well (1903)
- The Enchanting Enemy (1953)
- The Enchanting Shadow (1960)
- Enchantment: (1921 & 1948)
- Encino Man (1992)
- Enclave (2015)
- Enclosure (1961)
- Encore: (1951 & 1996)
- Encore heureux (2015)
- Encore, Once More Encore! (1992)
- Encounter: (2013, 2018 & 2021)
- Encounter in the Air (2019)
- Encounter at the Elbe (1949)
- Encounter in Salzburg (1964)
- Encounter with the Unknown (1972)
- Encounter with Werther (1949)
- Encounters in the Deep (1979)
- Encounters at the End of the World (2007)
- Encounters of the Spooky Kind (1980)
- Encounters of the Spooky Kind II (1990)
- Encrypt (2003) (TV)

==== End ====
- End (1984)
- The End: (1978, 1998 & 2012)
- The End of the Affair: (1955 & 1999)
- End of the Century (2019)
- End of Days (1999)
- End of an Era (1994)
- The End of Evangelion (1997)
- End Game (2006)
- End Game (2018)
- End of the Line: (1987 & 2007)
- The End of Love (2012)
- The End of Oak Street (2026)
- End Play (1975)
- End of a Priest (1969)
- End of the Road (1970)
- The End of the Road: (1919, 1936, 1954 & 1976)
- End of Sentence (2019)
- The End of Silence (2005)
- End of the Spear (2006)
- The End of St. Petersburg (1927)
- The End of Suburbia (2004)
- The End of Summer (1961)
- The End of the Tour (2015)
- The End of Violence (1997)
- End of Watch (2012)
- End of the World: (1931 & 1977)
- The End of the World: (1916 & 1992)
- The End of the World and the Cat's Disappearance (2015)
- Ender's Game (2013)
- Endgame: (1983 & 1999)
- Endhiran (2010)
- The Endless (2017)
- Endless Desire (1958)
- Endless Love: (1981, 2014 American & 2014 Burmese)
- Endless Night: (1972 & 2015)
- Endless Nights in Aurora (2014)
- Endless Poetry (2016)
- The Endless River (2015)
- The Endless Summer (1966)
- Enduring Love (2004)

==== Ene ====
- Enea (2023)
- Enemies (1940)
- Enemies (1953)
- Enemies (2025)
- Enemies (TBD)
- Enemies of Children (1923)
- Enemies Closer (2013)
- Enemies of Happiness (2006)
- Enemies In-Law (2015)
- Enemies of Laughter (2000)
- Enemies of the Law (1931)
- Enemies, a Love Story (1989)
- Enemies of the People (2009)
- Enemies of Society (1927)
- Enemies of the State (2020)
- Enemies of Women (1923)
- Enemies of Youth (1925)
- Enemmy (2013)
- Enemy (1990)
- Enemy (2013)
- Enemy (2015)
- Enemy (2021)
- The Enemy: (1916, 1927 & 1979)
- Enemy Agent (1940)
- The Enemy Below (1958)
- Enemy at the Gates (2001)
- Enemy Image (2005)
- An Enemy to the King (1916)
- Enemy of the Law (1945)
- An Enemy of Men (1925)
- Enemy Mine (1985)
- An Enemy of the People (1937)
- An Enemy of the People (1958)
- An Enemy of the People (1978)
- Enemy of the Police (1933)
- Enemy of the State (1998)
- Enemy Territory (1987)
- An Enemy Within (2025)
- Enemy of Women (1944)

==== Enf–Eng ====
- L'Enfant (2005)
- Enfant Terrible (2020)
- Enfantasme (1978)
- Les Enfants terribles (1950)
- Enfermo amor (2002)
- Enforcement (2020)
- The Enforcer: (1951 & 1976)
- Enforcer from Death Row (1976)
- Enga Amma Rani (2017)
- Enga Chinna Rasa (1987)
- Enga Kattula Mazhai (2018)
- Enga Mama (1970)
- Enga Muthalali (1993)
- Enga Oor Raja (1968)
- Enga Ooru Aattukkaran (1990)
- Enga Ooru Kavakkaran (1988)
- Enga Ooru Mappillai (1989)
- Enga Ooru Pattukaran (1987)
- Enga Ooru Rasathi (1980)
- Enga Ooru Sippai (1991)
- Enga Paappa (1966)
- Enga Pattan Sothu (1975)
- Enga Raasi Nalla Raasi (2009)
- Enga Thambi (1993)
- Enga Veettu Penn (1965)
- Enga Veettu Pillai (1965)
- Enga Veetu Velan (1992)
- Engada Iruthinga Ivvalavu Naala (2021)
- Engaeyum Eppothum (2011)
- Engaged to Death (1957)
- Engagement Ring (1951)
- Engagement at Wolfgangsee (1956)
- Engal Aasan (2009)
- Engal Anna (2004)
- Engal Kuladevi (1959)
- Engal Kural (1985)
- Engal Selvi (1960)
- Engal Swamy Ayyappan (1990)
- Engal Thanga Raja (1973)
- Engal Thangam (1970)
- Engalukkum Kaalam Varum (2001)
- Engalukkum Kalam Varum (1967)
- Engamma Maharani (1981)
- Engamma Sapatham (1974)
- Engane Nee Marakkum (1983)
- Enganeyundashaane (1984)
- Enge Enadhu Kavithai (2002)
- Engel im Fegefeuer (1964)
- Engel & Joe (2001)
- Engelen des doods (1998)
- Engeyum Kadhal (2011)
- Engine Sentai Go-onger: Boom Boom! Bang Bang! GekijōBang!! (2008)
- Engine Sentai Go-onger vs. Gekiranger (2009)
- Engineer (unreleased)
- Engineer Kochin's Error (1939)
- Engirundho Vandhaal (1970)
- Engirundho Vandhan (1995)
- Engitta Modhathey (2017)
- Engitta Mothathay (1990)
- England Is Mine (2017)
- The English Patient (1996)
- The English Teacher (2013)
- The Englishman who Went up a Hill but Came down a Mountain (1995)

==== Eni–Enn ====
- Enid (2009) (TV)
- Enigma (1982)
- Enigma (2001)
- Enigma (2025)
- The Enigma of Kaspar Hauser (1974)
- Enikku Njaan Swantham (1979)
- Enikku Vishakunnu (1983)
- Enikkum Oru Divasam (1982)
- Enippadigal (1979)
- Enippadikal (1973)
- Enjoy (2021)
- Enjoy (2022)
- Enjoy Yourselves (1934)
- Enkeyo Ketta Kural (1982)
- Enkilum Chandrike (2023)
- Enkiri Village: Dead End Survival (2011)
- Enlighten Thy Daughter (1917)
- Enlighten Thy Daughter (1934)
- Enlighten Up! (2009)
- Enlightenment Guaranteed (2002)
- Enna Muthalali Sowkiyama (1972)
- Enna Satham Indha Neram (2014)
- Enna Solla Pogirai (2022)
- Enna Thavam Seitheno (2018)
- Ennaalum Sarath..? (2018)
- Ennai Paar (1961)
- Ennai Paar Yogam Varum (2007)
- Ennai Pol Oruvan (1978)
- Ennai Thalatta Varuvala (2003)
- Ennai Vittu Pogaathe (1988)
- Ennalum Ente Aliya (2023)
- Ennamma Kannu (2000)
- Ennamo Nadakkudhu (2014)
- Ennarukil Nee Irunthal (1991)
- Ennathan Mudivu (1965)
- Ennavalle (2001)
- Ennavo Pudichirukku (2004)
- Enne Njan Thedunnu (1983)
- Enne Petha Raasa (1989)
- Enne Snehikkoo Enne Maathram (1981)
- Ennennum Kannettante (1986)
- Ennio (2021)
- Ennodu Ishtam Koodamo (1992)
- Ennodu Vilayadu (2017)
- Ennu Nathante Nimmi (1986)
- Ennu Ninte Moideen (2015)
- Ennu Swantham Janakikutty (1998)
- Ennu Swantham Punyalan (2025)
- Ennu Swantham Sreedharan (2023)
- Ennul Aayiram (2016)
- Ennum Eppozhum (2015)
- Ennum Nanmakal (1991)

==== Eno–Enz ====
- Eno (1973)
- Eno (2024)
- Enola Holmes (2020)
- Enola Holmes 2 (2022)
- Enola Holmes 3 (2026)
- Enough (2002)
- Enough! Lebanon's Darkest Hour (2021)
- Enough Said (2013)
- Enquête sur un scandale d'État (2021)
- Enredados, la confusión (2018)
- Enron: The Smartest Guys in the Room (2005)
- Ensign Pulver (1964)
- Enslavement: The True Story of Fanny Kemble (2000) (TV)
- Entangled (1993)
- Ente (2013)
- Ente Ammu Ninte Thulasi Avarude Chakki (1985)
- Ente Entethu Mathrem (1986)
- Ente Hridayathinte Vadakku Kizhakke Attathu (2017)
- Ente Kaanakkuyil (1985)
- Ente Kalithozhan (1984)
- Ente Katha (1983)
- Ente Mamattukkuttiyammakku (1983)
- Ente Mezhuthiri Athazhangal (2018)
- Ente Mohangal Poovaninju (1982)
- Ente Neelakaasham (1979)
- Ente Ponnu Thampuran (1992)
- Ente Sathrukkal (1982)
- Ente Shabdham (1986)
- Ente Sneham Ninakku Mathram (1979)
- Ente Sooryaputhrikku (1991)
- Ente Ummante Peru (2018)
- Ente Upasana (1984)
- Ente Veedu Appuvinteyum (2003)
- Entebbe (2018)
- Entede Bhanta (1992)
- Enter Arsène Lupin (1944)
- Enter the Dragon (1973)
- Enter the Ninja (1981)
- Enter the Phoenix (2004)
- Enter the Void (2009)
- The Entertainer (1960)
- Entha Manchivaadavuraa (2020)
- The Entity (1983)
- Entourage (2015)
- Entr'acte (1924)
- Entrapment (1999)
- Entre Nous (1983)
- Enuff Is Enuff (1973)
- Envy: (2004 & 2009)
- Enzo (2025)

=== Eo–Eq ===
- Eoudong (1985)
- Epar Opar (1975)
- Ephemera (2026)
- Ephraim's Rescue (2013)
- Epic (1984)
- Epic (2013)
- The Epic of Everest (1924)
- The Epic of Gilgamesh, or This Unnameable Little Broom (1985)
- Epic Movie (2007)
- Epicentro (2020)
- Epidemic (1987)
- Epifanio Ang Bilas Ko: NB-Eye (1995)
- Epilogue (1983)
- Epilogue (1984)
- Episode (1935)
- An Episode in the Life of an Iron Picker (2013)
- Epitaph (2007)
- Epitaph (2015)
- An Epitaph for Barbara Radziwill (1983)
- Epitome (1953)
- Epoch (2001)
- Eppodhum Raja (2024)
- Epsilon (1995)
- An Equal Playing Field (2015)
- Equal Standard (2020)
- Equality (2010)
- The Equalizer series:
  - The Equalizer (2014)
  - The Equalizer 2 (2018)
  - The Equalizer 3 (2023)
- Equalizer 2000 (1987)
- Equals (2015)
- The Equation of Love and Death (2008)
- Equilibrium (2002)
- Equinox (1970)
- Equinox (1986)
- Equinox (1992)
- Equinox Flower (1958)
- Equity (2016)
- Equus (1977)

=== Er ===
- Er Conde Jones (2011)
- Er Dong (2008)
- Er fattaccio (1952)
- Er Più – storia d'amore e di coltello (1971)

==== Era–Eru ====
- Era Bator Sur (1956)
- Era d'estate (2016)
- Era lui... sì! sì! (1951)
- Eradane Maduve (2010)
- Eradane Sala (2017)
- Eradondla Mooru (2015)
- Eradu Kanasu (1974)
- Eradu Kanasu (2017)
- Eradu Mukha (1969)
- Eradu Nakshatragalu (1983)
- Eradu Rekhegalu (1984)
- Eradane Maduve (2010)
- Eradane Sala (2017)
- Eradondla Mooru (2015)
- Eragon (2006)
- Erase and Forget (2017)
- Erased (2012)
- Erased (2016)
- Erased (2018)
- Eraser (1996)
- Eraser Children (2009)
- Eraser: Reborn (2022)
- Eraser Wars (2017)
- Eraserhead (1977)
- Eraserheads: Combo on the Run (2025)
- Eraserheads: The Reunion Concert (2008)
- Erasing David (2010)
- Erasing Eden (2016)
- Erasing Frank (2021)
- Das Erbe (1935)
- The Erection of Toribio Bardelli (2023)
- Eregla Panodchi (2015)
- The Eremites (2016)
- Eric and Ernie (2011) (TV)
- Eric, Ernie and Me (2017) (TV)
- Erida (2021)
- Erik the Viking (1989)
- Erin Brockovich (2000)
- Ermo (1994)
- Ernakulam Junction (1971)
- Ernest and Bertram (2002)
- Ernest Borgnine on the Bus (1997)
- Ernest & Celestine (2012)
- Ernest & Celestine: A Trip to Gibberitia (2022)
- The Ernest Green Story (1993)
- Ernest Maltravers (1920)
- Ernest P. Worrell series:
  - Ernest in the Army (1998)
  - Ernest Goes to Africa (1997)
  - Ernest Goes to Camp (1987)
  - Ernest Goes to Jail (1990)
  - Ernest Goes to School (1994)
  - Ernest Rides Again (1993)
  - Ernest Saves Christmas (1988)
  - Ernest Scared Stupid (1991)
  - Slam Dunk Ernest (1995)
- Ernest the Rebel (1938)
- Ernesto (1979)
- Ernie & Emma (2026)
- The Ernie Game (1967)
- Ernst Thälmann (1954, 1955 sequel)
- Eroica (1949)
- Eroica (1958)
- Eroica (2003) (TV)
- Eros (2004)
- Eros in Chains (1929)
- Eros, o Deus do Amor (1981)
- Eros + Massacre (1969)
- Erotic Ghost Story (1990)
- Erotic Inferno (1975)
- Erotic Liaisons (1992)
- Erotic Nights of the Living Dead (1980)
- Erotica: A Journey Into Female Sexuality (1997)
- The Eroticist (1972)
- Erotikon (1920)
- Erotikon (1929)
- Erotique (1994)
- Erotissimo (1969)
- Erotomania (1974)
- Erra Bus (2014)
- Erra Mallelu (1981)
- Erra Sainyam (1994)
- The Errand of Angels (2008)
- The Errand Boy (1961)
- Errant Husbands (1931)
- Errementari (2017)
- Erreway: 4 caminos (2004)
- Errors of the Human Body (2012)
- Errors of Youth (1978)
- Erskineville Kings (1999)
- Erstwhile Susan (1919)
- Erupcja (2026)
- Eruption (2010)
- The Eruption of Mount Pelee (1902)
- The Eruption of Mount St. Helens! (1980)

=== Es ===
- Esa "Flies" to Kuopio (1953)
- Esa mujer (1969)
- Esau (2019)
- Escaflowne (2000)
- Escalation: (1968 American & 1968 Italian)
- Escanaba in da Moonlight (2001)
- Escapade (1932)
- Escapade (1935)
- Escapade (1936)
- Escapade (1955)
- Escapade (1957)
- Escapade in Japan (1957)
- Escape: (1928, 1940, 1948, 1991, 2005, 2012 American, 2012 Norwegian, 2024 South Korean & 2024 Spanish)
- Escape! (1930)
- The Escape: (1914, 1926, 1928, 1939, 1944, 1972, 1998 TV, 2009, 2016 & 2017)
- Escape at Dawn (1950)
- Escape from Alcatraz (1979)
- Escape from Angola (1976)
- Escape from Atlantis (1997) (TV)
- Escape from Broadmoor (1948)
- Escape from the Bronx (1983)
- Escape from Crime (1942)
- Escape from Devil's Island (1935)
- Escape from East Berlin (1962)
- Escape from Fort Bravo (1953)
- Escape from Galaxy 3 (1981)
- Escape from Germany (2024)
- Escape from Hat (unreleased)
- Escape from Hong Kong Island (2004)
- Escape from L.A. (1996)
- Escape from the 'Liberty' Cinema (1990)
- Escape from Mars (1999) (TV)
- Escape from Mogadishu (2021)
- Escape from New York (1981)
- Escape from the Planet of the Apes (1971)
- Escape from Planet Earth (2013)
- Escape from Sobibor (1987) (TV)
- Escape from Suburbia (2007)
- Escape from Wildcat Canyon (1998)
- Escape from Zahrain (1962)
- Escape Clause (1996) (TV)
- Escape Dangerous (1947)
- Escape Fire: The Fight to Rescue American Healthcare (2012)
- Escape: Human Cargo (1998) (TV)
- Escape Me Never (1935)
- Escape Me Never (1947)
- Escape by Night (1937)
- Escape by Night (1953)
- Escape by Night (1960)
- Escape Plan series:
  - Escape Plan (2013)
  - Escape Plan 2: Hades (2018)
  - Escape Plan: The Extractors (2019)
- Escape Room (2018)
- Escape Room (2019)
- Escape Room: Tournament of Champions (2021)
- Escape Route (1952)
- Escape Under Pressure (2000)
- Escape Velocity (1999)
- Escape to Victory (1981)
- Escape to Witch Mountain: (1975 & 1995 TV)
- The Escapist: (2002 & 2008)
- Escort West (1959)
- Eskimo Artist: Kenojuak (1964)
- Eskimo Limon (1978)
- Eskimo Nell (1975)
- Esme, My Love (2022)
- Esmeralda: (1905, 1915 & 1922)
- España, la primera globalización (2021)
- Especially on Sunday (1991)
- Espion, lève-toi (1982)
- Essai d'ouverture (1988)
- Essex Boys (2000)
- Est - Ouest (1999)
- Esta noche mejor no (1965)
- Estas são as armas (1978)
- Estate (2020)
- Estate (2022)
- The Estate (2020)
- The Estate (2022)
- Estate Violenta (1961)
- Esther: (1916, 1986 & 1999 TV)
- Esther and the King (1960)
- Esther Waters (1948)
- Esto huele mal (2007)
- Estoy en crisis (1982)
- Estoy hecho un demonio (1972)
- Estranged (2006)
- La estrategia del caracol (1993)
- Estrella of the Sierra Morena (1952)
- Estrellita (1947)

=== Et ===
- Et øye på hver finger (1961)
- Eterna (2022)
- Eternal (2004)
- The Eternal (1998)
- Eternal Beauty (2019)
- Eternal Blood (2002)
- The Eternal Breasts (1955)
- The Eternal City: (1915, 1923 & 2008)
- An Eternal Combat (1991)
- The Eternal Daughter (2022)
- The Eternal Empire (1995)
- The Eternal Flame (1922)
- The Eternal Grind (1916)
- The Eternal Jew (1940)
- Eternal Love: (1917 & 1929)
- The Eternal Magdalene (1919)
- The Eternal Memory (2023)
- Eternal Moment (2011)
- The Eternal Moment (2021)
- Eternal Mother (2017)
- The Eternal Question (1916)
- The Eternal Return (1943)
- The Eternal Return of Antonis Paraskevas (2013)
- The Eternal Road (2017)
- The Eternal Sapho (1916)
- The Eternal Sea (1955)
- The Eternal Secret (1942)
- The Eternal Sin (1917)
- Eternal Spring (2022)
- The Eternal Springtime (2021)
- Eternal Summer: (2006 & 2015)
- Eternal Sunshine of the Spotless Mind (2004)
- The Eternal Temptress (1917)
- The Eternal Three (1923)
- The Eternal Waltz (1954)
- Eternal Winter (2018)
- The Eternal Zero (2013)
- Eternally Yours (1939)
- Eternals (2021)
- Eternity: (1943, 1990, 2010 South African, 2010 Thai, 2013, 2016, 2018 & 2025)
- Eternity and a Day (1998)
- Eternity: The Movie (2014)
- An Ethics Lesson (2013)
- Ethir Kaatru (1990)
- Ethir Neechal (2013)
- Ethiraalikal (1982)
- Ethirigal Jakkirathai (1967)
- Ethirkalam (1970)
- Ethiroli (1970)
- Ethirppukal (1984)
- Ethirum Puthirum (1999)
- Etho Oru Swapnam (1978)
- Etho Seithai Ennai (2012)
- Ethoofaaneerey (1998)
- Ethos (2011)
- Eththan (2011)
- Ethumai Methumai (2011)
- Etienne! (2009)
- Eto Na Naman Ako (2000)
- Etoile (1989)
- Ettekaal Second (2014)
- Ettupatti Rasa (1997)
- Ettuthikkum Madhayaanai (2015)
- Ettuthikkum Para (2020)

=== Eu ===
- Eu Não Faço a Menor Ideia do que eu Tô Fazendo Com a Minha Vida (2012)
- Eugene Aram: (1914, 1915 & 1924)
- Eugene Onegin: (1911 & 1959)
- Eugenia Grandet: (1918, 1946 & 1953)
- Eugénie Grandet (1994)
- Eugene the Marine (2025)
- Eugenie... The Story of Her Journey into Perversion (1970)
- Eulogy (2004)
- Eunice (1982) (TV)
- Eunuch (1986)
- Eunuchs (2007) (TV)
- Eunuchs: India's Third Gender (1991) (TV)
- Euphoria: (2006, 2017 & 2018)
- Eureka: (1979, 1983, 2000, 2020 & 2023)
- Eureka Stockade: (1907 & 1949)
- Europa: (1931, 1991 & 2021)
- Europa Europa (1990)
- Europa Report (2013)
- Europe '51 (1952)
- Europe Doesn't Answer (1941)
- Europe, General Delivery (1918)
- Europe in the Raw (1963)
- Europe's New Faces (2025)
- The Europeans: (1979 & 2020)
- EuroTrip (2004)
- Euthanizer (2017)

=== Ev ===
==== Eva–Evd ====
- Eva (1948)
- Eva (1953)
- Eva (1958)
- Eva (1962)
- Eva (2010)
- Eva (2011)
- Eva (2018)
- Eva (2023)
- Eva from Argentina (2011)
- Eva Doesn't Sleep (2015)
- Eva and the Grasshopper (1927)
- Eva & Leon (2015)
- Eva Perón: The True Story (1996)
- Eva, ¿qué hace ese hombre en tu cama? (1975)
- Eva in Silk (1928)
- Eva, The Sin (1920)
- Eva tropí hlouposti (1939)
- Evadaithe Nakenti (2007)
- Evadi Gola Vaadidhi (2005)
- Evan Almighty (2007)
- Evandi Aavida Vachindi (1993)
- Evandoi Srivaru (2006)
- Evangeline (1913)
- Evangeline (1919)
- Evangeline (1929)
- Evangeline (2013)
- Evangelion series:
  - Evangelion: Death and Rebirth (1997)
  - Evangelion: 1.0 You Are (Not) Alone (2007)
  - Evangelion: 2.0 You Can (Not) Advance (2009)
  - Evangelion: 3.0 You Can (Not) Redo (2012)
  - Evangelion: 3.0+1.0 Thrice Upon a Time (2021)
- The Evangelist (1916)
- The Evangelist (1924)
- Evano Oruvan (2007)
- Evanukku Engeyo Matcham Irukku (2018)
- Evaraina Epudaina (2009)
- Evare Athagadu (2003)
- Evargal Indiyargal (1987)
- Evcilik Oyunu (1964)
- Evdokia (1971)

==== Eve ====
- Eve: (1968 & 2008)
- Eve of Destruction (1991)
- Eve in Exile (1919)
- Eve and the Fire Horse (2005)
- Eve and the Handyman (1961)
- Eve Knew Her Apples (1945)
- Eve and the Serpent (1949)
- Eve's Bayou (1997)
- Eve's Daughter (1918)
- Eve's Daughters (1928)
- Eve's Leaves (1926)
- Eve's Love Letters (1927)
- Eve's Lover (1925)
- Eve's Necklace (2010)
- Eve's Secret (1925)
- Evel Knievel: (1971 & 2004 TV)
- Evelyn (2002)
- Evelyn: The Cutest Evil Dead Girl (2002)
- Evelyn's Love Adventures (1921)
- Even Angels Eat Beans (1973)
- Even As You and I (1917)
- Even the Clouds Are Drifting (1959)
- Even Cowgirls Get the Blues (1993)
- Even Dwarfs Started Small (1970)
- Even as Eve (1920)
- Even Hitler Had a Girlfriend (1991)
- Even as IOU (1942)
- Even Lambs Have Teeth (2015)
- Even Lovers Get the Blues (2016)
- Even Money (2006)
- Even in My Dreams (2008)
- Even Pigeons Go to Heaven (2007)
- Even the Rain (2010)
- Even Though the Whole World Is Burning (2014)
- Even When I Fall (2017)
- Evening (2007)
- Evening Bell (1988)
- Evening Bells (1986)
- Evening in Byzantium (1978)
- Evening Clothes (1927)
- An Evening of Edgar Allan Poe (1970)
- An Evening with Kevin Smith (2002)
- Evening Land (1977)
- The Evening Star (1996)
- Evening – Night – Morning (1920)
- Evening of Roses (2009)
- Evening Shadows (2018)
- An Evening Visit (1934)
- Evenings (1989)
- Evenings for Sale (1932)
- Evensong (1934)
- Event Horizon (1997)
- Ever After (1998)
- Ever After The Musical (2015)
- Ever Been to the Moon? (2015)
- Ever in My Heart (1933)
- Ever Ready (1946)
- Ever Since Eve: (1921, 1934 & 1937)
- Ever Since Venus (1944)
- Ever Since We Love (2015)
- Eveready Harton in Buried Treasure (1928)
- Everest: (1998 & 2015)
- Everlasting Moments (2008)
- Everlasting Regret (2005)
- Every Breath You Take (2021)
- Every Child (1979)
- Every Day: (2010 & 2018)
- Every Girl Should Be Married (1948)
- Every Little Step (2008)
- Every Man for Himself (1980)
- Every Secret Thing (2014)
- Every Time I Die (2019)
- Every Which Way but Loose (1978)
- Everybody Has Secrets (2004)
- Everybody Knows (2018)
- Everybody in Our Family (2012)
- Everybody Wants Some!! (2016)
- Everybody Wins (1990)
- Everybody's All-American (1988)
- Everybody's Famous! (2000)
- Everybody's Fine: (2009 & 2016)
- Everyday: (2000 & 2012)
- Everyman's Feast (2002)
- Everynight ... Everynight (1994)
- Everyone Loves Mel (1998)
- Everyone Says I Love You (1996)
- Everyone's Hero (2006)
- Everything Everywhere All at Once (2022)
- Everything Goes (2004)
- Everything Is Illuminated (2005)
- Everything Must Go (2010)
- Everything You Always Wanted to Know About Sex* (*But Were Afraid to Ask) (1972)
- Everything's Gone Green (2006)
- Everything's Going to Be Great (2025)

==== Evi–Evr ====
- The Evictors (1979)
- Evidam Swargamanu (2009)
- Evidence: (1915, 1922, 1929, 1988, 2012 & 2013)
- The Evidence of the Film (1913)
- Evil: (2003 & 2005)
- Evil Alien Conquerors (2002)
- Evil Aliens (2006)
- Evil Ambitions (1996)
- Evil Angel (2009)
- Evil Angels (1988)
- Evil Bong (2006)
- Evil Bong 2: King Bong (2009)
- Evil Bong 3D: The Wrath of Bong (2011)
- Evil Brain from Outer Space (1964)
- Evil Breed: The Legend of Samhain (2003)
- Evil Calls: The Raven (2011)
- Evil Cat (1987)
- Evil Clutch (1988)
- The Evil Cult (1993)
- Evil Dead series:
  - The Evil Dead (1981)
  - Evil Dead II (1987)
  - Army of Darkness (1992)
  - Evil Dead (2013)
  - Evil Dead Rise (2023)
  - Evil Dead Burn (2026)
- Evil Dead Trap (1988)
- Evil Dead Trap 3: Broken Love Killer (1993)
- Evil Ed (1995)
- Evil Eye (2020)
- The Evil Eye: (1917 & 1920)
- Evil Eyes (2004)
- The Evil of Frankenstein (1964)
- Evil Laugh (1986)
- The Evil That Men Do (1984)
- Evil Toons (1992)
- Evil Twin (2007)
- Evil Under the Sun (1982)
- The Evil Within: (1970 & 2017)
- Evil: In the Time of Heroes (2009)
- Evil's Evil Cousin (2016)
- Evilenko (2004)
- Evita: (1996 & 2008)
- Evolusi KL Drift (2008)
- Evolusi KL Drift 2 (2010)
- Evolution: (1971, 2001, 2015 & 2021)
- Evolution of a Filipino Family (2004)
- Evolution's Child (1999 TV)
- Evolver (1995)
- Evrydiki BA 2O37 (1975)

=== Ew ===
- Ewa (2016)
- Ewiger Wald (1936)
- Ewoks: The Battle for Endor (1985) (TV)

=== Ex ===
- The Ex: (1997 & 2007)
- Ex Ex Lovers (2025)
- Ex Fighting (2014)
- Ex Libris: The New York Public Library (2017)
- Ex Machina (2014)
- Ex-Bad Boy (1931)
- Ex-Champ (1939)
- The Ex-File 3: The Return of the Exes (2017)
- Ex-Files (2014)
- Ex-Files 2 (2015)
- Ex-Flame (1930)
- Ex-Girlfriends (2012)
- Ex-Husbands (2025)
- Ex-Lady (1933)

==== Exa–Exi ====
- Exam: (2003 & 2009)
- The Exam: (2006 & 2011)
- Excalibur (1981)
- Excavator (2017)
- Excellent Cadavers (1999)
- The Exception (2016)
- Exception to the Rule (1997)
- Excess Baggage: (1928, 1933 & 1997)
- Excess Flesh (2015)
- Excessive Force (1993)
- Excessive Force II: Force on Force (1995)
- Exchange of Wives (1925)
- Exchanged (2019)
- Excision (2012)
- Excited (2009)
- Excitement (1924)
- Excluded from the Public (1927)
- Exclusive (1937)
- The Exclusive: Beat the Devil's Tattoo (2015)
- Exclusive Story (1936)
- Excursion (2023)
- Excursion to the Moon (1908)
- Excursions (2016)
- Excuse Me: (1915, 1925 & 2003)
- Excuse Me Darling, but Lucas Loved Me (1997)
- Excuse My Dust: (1920 & 1951)
- Excuse My French (2014)
- Execution (1968)
- Execution in Autumn (1972)
- Execution of a Dead Man (1985)
- Execution Squad (1972)
- Executioner (1974)
- The Executioner: (1963, 1970, 1975 & 1990)
- The Executioner's Song (1982) (TV)
- Executioners (1993)
- Executioners from Shaolin (1977)
- Executive Action (1973)
- Executive Decision (1996)
- Executive Protection (2001)
- Executive Suite (1954)
- Exergue – on documenta 14 (2024)
- Exeter (2015)
- Exhibit A (2007)
- Exhibition (2013)
- Exhumed (2003)
- Exile: (1917, 1994, 2012, 2016, 2020 & 2022)
- The Exile: (1914, 1922, 1931 & 1947)
- Exile Express (1939)
- Exile and the Kingdom (1993)
- Exile to Siberia (1930)
- Exiled: (2006 & 2019)
- Exiled to Shanghai (1937)
- The Exiles: (1923 & 1961)
- eXistenZ (1999)
- Exists (2014)
- Exit: (1986, 2000, 2006, 2011 & 2019)
- Exit 8 (2025)
- Exit 33 (2011)
- Exit 67 (2010)
- Exit the Dragon, Enter the Tiger (1976)
- Exit Dying (1976 TV)
- Exit to Eden (1994)
- Exit Humanity (2011)
- Exit Plan (2019)
- Exit Point (2019)
- Exit in Red (1996)
- Exit Smiling (1926)
- Exit Speed (2008)
- Exit Strategy (2012)
- Exit Through the Gift Shop (2010)
- Exit: una storia personale (2010)
- Exit the Vamp (1921)
- Exit Wounds (2001)
- Exits (1979)

==== Exo–Ext ====
- Exo oi kleftes (1961)
- Exodus: (1960, 2007 British, 2007 Hong Kong, 2015, 2020 & 2024)
- Exodus: A Journey to the Mountain of God (1992)
- Exodus: Gods and Kings (2014)
- Exodus: Tales from the Enchanted Kingdom (2005)
- The Exorcism (2024)
- Exorcism at 60,000 Feet (2019)
- Exorcism Chronicles: The Beginning (2024)
- The Exorcism of Emily Rose (2005)
- Exorcism: The Possession of Gail Bowers (2006)
- The Exorcist series:
  - The Exorcist (1973)
  - Exorcist II: The Heretic (1977)
  - The Ninth Configuration (1980)
  - The Exorcist III (1990)
  - Exorcist: The Beginning (2004)
  - Dominion: Prequel to the Exorcist (2005)
  - The Exorcist: Believer (2023)
- Exorcist Master (1992)
- Exorcist Vengeance (2022)
- Exotica (1994)
- Expecting (2013)
- Expecting Amish (2014)
- Expecting Love (2008)
- Expecting Mary (2010)
- Expecting a Miracle (2009 TV)
- Expedition: Bismarck (2002) (TV)
- Expelled: No Intelligence Allowed (2008)
- The Expendables: (1988 & 2000 TV)
- The Expendables series:
  - The Expendables (2010)
  - The Expendables 2 (2012)
  - The Expendables 3 (2014)
  - Expend4bles (2023)
- Das Experiment (2001)
- The Experiment: (1922 & 2010)
- Experiment Perilous (1944)
- Experiment in Terror (1962)
- Experiments in the Revival of Organisms (1940)
- The Expert: (1932 & 1995)
- The Experts: (1973 & 1989)
- The Exploits of Elaine (1914)
- The Explorer (1915)
- Explorers (1985)
- Exponát roku 1827 (2008)
- Exporting Raymond (2010)
- The Express (2008)
- Expresso Bongo (1959)
- The Expulsion (1923)
- The Exterminating Angel (1962)
- The Exterminator (1980)
- Exterminator 2 (1984)
- Extinct (2021)
- Extinction (2018)
- The Extra: (1962 & 2005)
- The Extra Man (2010)
- Extra Ordinary (2019)
- Extra Terrestrial Visitors (1983)
- Extract (2009)
- Extraction: (2015 & 2020)
- Extraction 2 (2023)
- The Extraordinary Adventures of Adèle Blanc-Sec (2010)
- The Extraordinary Adventures of Mr. West in the Land of the Bolsheviks (1924)
- Extraordinary Measures (2010)
- Extraordinary Mission (2017)
- The Extreme Adventures of Super Dave (2000)
- Extreme Close-Up (2003)
- Extreme Measures (1996)
- Extreme Ops (2002)
- Extreme Prejudice (1987)
- An Extremely Goofy Movie (2000)
- Extremely Loud and Incredibly Close (2012)
- Extremely Unique Dynamic (2024)
- Extremely Wicked, Shockingly Evil and Vile (2019)
- Extremities (1986)

=== Ey ===
- The Eye series:
  - The Eye (2002)
  - The Eye 2 (2004)
  - The Eye 10 (2005)
- The Eye (2008)
- Eye on the Ball (2019)
- Eye of the Beast (2007) (TV)
- Eye of the Beholder (2000)
- Eye of the Cat (1969)
- Eye of the Cat (1975)
- Eye of the Day (20010
- Eye of the Devil (1967)
- Eye of the Dolphin (2007)
- Eye of the Eagle (1987)
- Eye of the Eagle (1997)
- Eye of the Eagle 2: Inside the Enemy (1989)
- Eye for an Eye: (1996, 2008, 2019 & 2025)
- An Eye for an Eye: (1966, 1981 & 2016)
- Eye for Eye (1918)
- Eye of God (1997)
- Eye of the Hurricane (1989)
- Eye of the Hurricane (2012)
- Eye on Juliet (2017)
- Eye in the Labyrinth (1972)
- Eye of the Leopard (2006) (TV)
- Eye Myth (1967)
- Eye of the Needle (1981)
- Eye in the Sky: (2007 & 2015)
- Eye of the Spider (1971)
- Eye of the Stalker (1995) (TV)
- Eye of the Storm: (1991 & 2015)
- The Eye of the Storm: (1970, 2009 & 2011)
- Eyes of Terror (1994) (TV)
- Eye of the Tiger (1986)
- Eye of the Widow (1991)
- Eyeball (1975)
- Eyelids (2015)
- The Eyes of Annie Jones (1964)
- Eyes in the Dark (2010)
- Eyes of Fire (1983)
- Eyes of Laura Mars (1978)
- The Eyes of My Mother (2016)
- The Eyes of Mystery (1918)
- Eyes in the Night (1942)
- Eyes of a Stranger (1981)
- The Eyes of Tammy Faye: (2000 & 2021)
- Eyes Wide Open (2009)
- Eyes Wide Shut (1999)
- Eyes Without a Face (1960)
- Eyewitness (1981)
- Eyjafjallajökull (2013)
- Eyyvah Eyvah (2010)
- Eyyvah Eyvah 2 (2011)
- Eyyvah Eyvah 3 (2014)

=== Ez ===
- Ezhai Jaathi (1993)
- Ezhai Padum Padu (1950)
- Ezhai Pangalan (1963)
- Ezhai Uzhavan (1952)
- Ezham Rathri (1982)
- Ezham Suryan (2012)
- Ezhamathe Varavu (2013)
- Ezhamkadalinakkare (1979)
- Ezhandha Kadhal (1941)
- Ezhara Ponnana (1992)
- Ezharakoottam (1995)
- Ezhavathu Manithan (1982)
- Ezhayin Aasthi (1955)
- Ezhu Muthal Onpathu Vare (1985)
- Ezhu Rathrikal (1968)
- Ezhu Sundara Rathrikal (2013)
- Ezhumalai (2002)
- Ezhumin (2018)
- Ezhunnallathu (1991)
- Ezhupunna Tharakan (1999)
- Ezhuthapurangal (1987)
- Ezhuthatha Kadha (1970)
- Ezhuthatha Sattangal (1984)
- Ezra (2007)
- Ezra (2017)
- Ezra (2023)

Previous: List of films: D Next: List of films: F

== See also ==
- Lists of films
- Lists of actors
- List of film and television directors
- List of documentary films
- List of film production companies
