= Fant =

Fant may refer to:

== People ==
- Christer Fant (born 1953), Swedish actor
- Claes-Göran Fant (born 1951), Swedish Army officer
- Gene Fant Jr. (born 1963), American religious scholar
- George Fant (actor) (1916–1998), Swedish actor
- George Fant (American football) (born 1992), American football player
- Gunnar Fant (1919–2009), American researcher
- Jay Fant (born 1968), American politician
- Kenne Fant (1923–2016), Swedish actor
- Kevin Fant (born 1980), American football player
- Lou Fant (1931–2001), American teacher
- Noah Fant (born 1997), American football player
- Phylicia Fant, American music executive
- Princeton Fant (born 1999), American football player

== Places ==
- Fant, a ward in Maidstone, Kent, England

== Other ==
- Fant (film) (1937)
- FANT, Forces Armées Nationales Tchadiennes, the Chadian National Armed Forces
- Fant v. The City of Ferguson
- Fant-Asia or Fantasia International Film Festival-Asia
- Fant Broadcasting, taken over by The Outlet Company
