= Artegg-yumi =

Japanese singer-songwriter, film director and producer

artegg-yumi
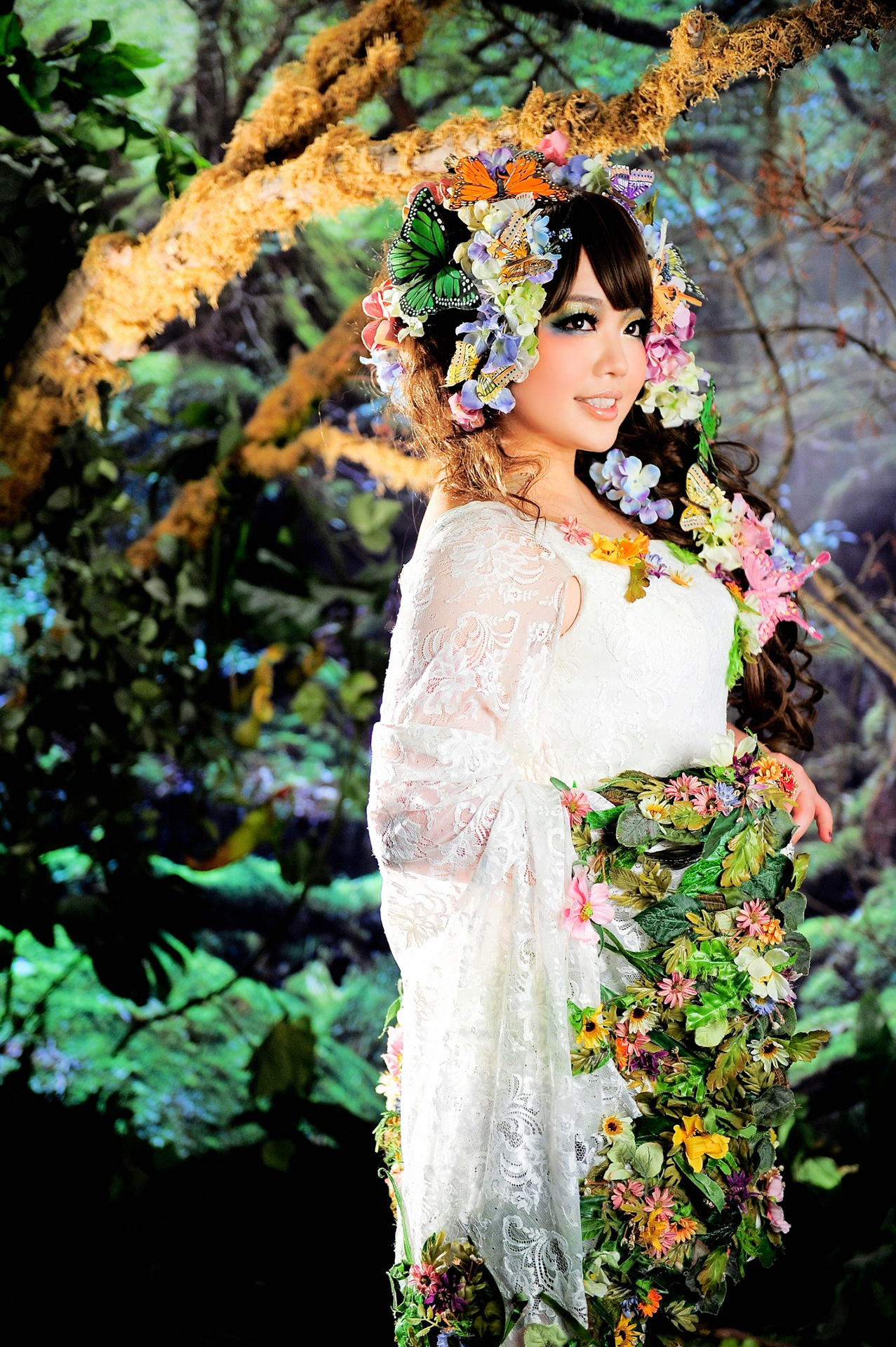
- artegg-yumi in 2020

Background information
- Occupations: Musician; singer-songwriter; lyricist; arranger; film director
- Instruments: Vocals; programming
- Label: Studio artegg
- Website: artegg-yumi.net

Artegg-yumi is a Japanese singer-songwriter, film director and producer. She is a member of the Director's Guild of Japan.

== Career ==
She is the creator, director and producer of the film Kohtaro in Space Wonderland and was awarded the Young Creative Awards at the Cinema New York City in 2017, where Bo Svenson and others were judges. In the same year, the film was distributed to libraries all across Japan and held a serial publication in the Kids Station corporate DVD. The film was screened at the box office for one week at the Cinema Novecento in Yokohama city of Kanagawa prefecture.

The film One last time, produced in 2018, received high reviews from the movie critics Pieter-Jan Van Haecke and Panos Kotzathanasis.

Provided music and theme song to the films Eraser Wars and "MIDNIGHT" directed by AKIRA.

When starring on the program Super Idol, shown on Taiwan Television Enterprise, critiqued by the composer Wang Chi-ping as having "incredible melody, creativity and performance" and by Huang Kuo-lun as having the "uniqueness and talent like an anime character".

The song "Distant sky (Harukana Sora)" in which she participated as the vocalist and lyricist was published in the music magazine, Monthly Player #577 as an outstanding work.

== Discography ==
=== Singles ===
As lead artist

Year	Title
2009	I Send My Love to You
2009	Welcom From Speas
2015	art is
2015	into the Sky
2016	Since I Miss You

=== Albums ===
Year	Title
2008	Endless Yumical
2017	Eraser Wars and Mor
2017	Numerous Planets in the Poured Drink: The Song That Was Never Meant to, Reaches You Now
2019	Movie Music Collection, Vol. 3 + Bamboo Cutter

=== Movie ===
==== Feature film ====
- Kohtaro in Space Wonderland（2017）

- CINEMA NEW York Festival - cinema New York City official selection Young Creative Awards
- Toronto international independent film festival
- Aichi International Women's Film Festival

=== Art activity ===
- Group exhibition

- Tokyo Metropolitan Art Museum (2014) - Belladonna Art Exhibition-3D Works Exhibition (Belladonna Art Selected)
- Navigating the Japanese Future 2014 (2014)- Exhibition at HIVE Gallery in Los Angeles. Selected as an official poster.
- Tokyo Metropolitan Art Museum (2015) - Belladonna Art Exhibition-Selected Exhibition

- Published

- Contemporary Art Artist File IV (2015)
- COOL JAPAN creators file IV (Publishing, ARTBOX International) (2015)
- Cool Japan creators file V (2017)
