= List of films: E–I =

Separate lists have been created for each letter:

- List of films: E
- List of films: F
- List of films: G
- List of films: H
- List of films: I
