= Global Oneness Project =

- Categories: Non-profit Education Organization
- Founded: 2006
- Company: Global Oneness Project LLC
- Country: United States
- Based in: San Francisco Bay Area
- Language: English
- Website: www.globalonenessproject.org

The Global Oneness Project is a free multimedia education platform providing stories and lessons for growing minds.

== Content and coverage ==
Global Oneness Project offers documentary films, photography, essays, and curricula that explore social, cultural, and environmental issues.

Contributing filmmakers, photographers, and writers include Matt Black, Robert Hass, Kalyanee Mam, Parker Palmer, Camille Seaman, and Emmanuel Vaughan-Lee, among others. Films include stories from Australia, Cambodia, Ecuador, India, South Africa, and the United States, among others.

== History ==
Founded in 2006 by Emmanuel Vaughan-Lee, the Global Oneness Project provides stories through documentary films, photo essays, and essays.

Films have been aired or released on The New York Times, TED, The Atlantic, Aeon Film, ABC Australia (Australian Broadcasting Corporation), Huffington Post, Current TV, Link TV PBS, among others.

== Awards ==
In 2008, Global Oneness Project was an Honoree in the subject of Activism for the Webby Awards In 2018, Global Oneness Project was awarded a "Best Website for Teaching and Learning" by the American Library Association. Common Sense Media, in 2018, selected Global Oneness Project as a top pick for learning with a four-star review, stating the Project provides "Captivating, cross-curricular stories [to] increase cultural awareness."
