= Daniel Peredo =

Peruvian sports journalist

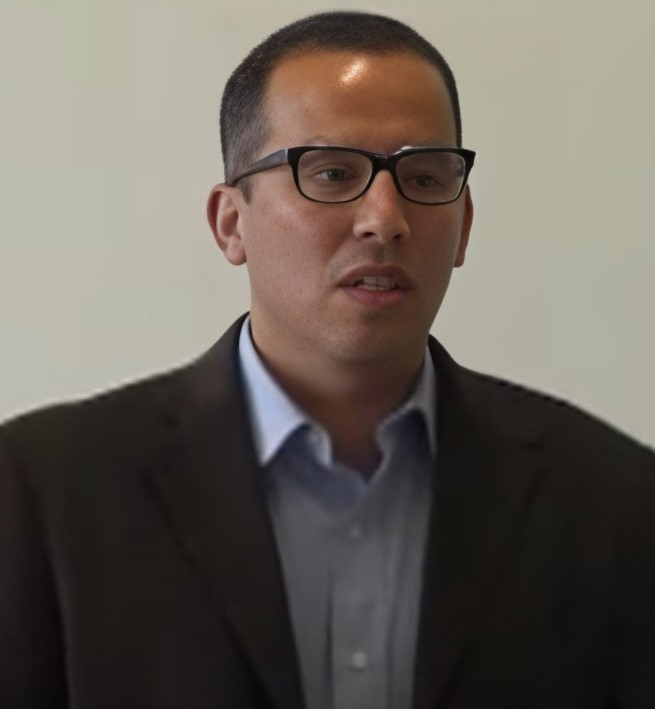
- Peredo in 2012
- Born: Daniel Kirino Peredo Menchola; June 17, 1969; Lima
- Died: February 19, 2018 (aged 48); Lima
- Occupations: Broadcast journalist; sports commentator

Daniel Kirino Peredo Menchola (17 June 1969 – 19 February 2018) was a Peruvian journalist, announcer and writer. He worked for several important newspapers and in TV and radio in Peru. He was one of the most important Peruvian sports journalists. He is considered one of the best sports storytellers of Peruvian football and one of the most loved in recent years by the fans of that country.

== Early life ==
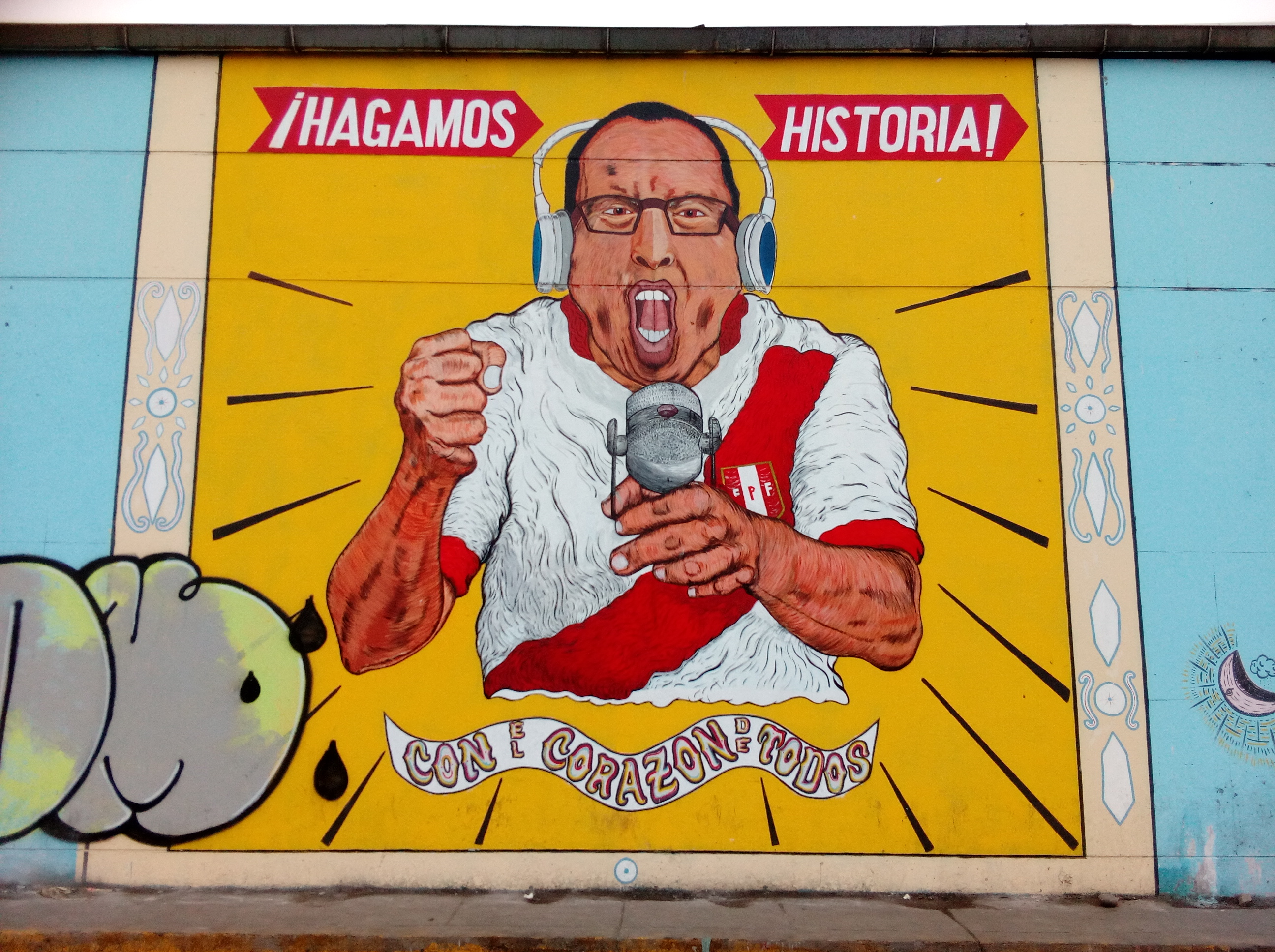
A mural of Daniel Peredo near the National Stadium bridge, made by Paulo Altamirano

Daniel Peredo was born on June 17, 1969, in Lima, Peru. Raised in the Pueblo Libre district of Lima, he also made it his home for his own young family. His parents were originally from Chiclayo. He had two daughters with his wife Milagros Llamosas Salas.

Sports journalism was his passion; he dedicated himself to this path at a very early age. The classification of the National Soccer Team of Peru for the World Cups of 1970, 1978 and 1982 and the championship in the Fifteenth South American Championship (today Copa América) were catalysts for his career dreams.

Peredo was comfortable in all sports media: television, radio and written press. In his first assignment as a columnist for the sports section of Ojo and later, working for the sports journal El Bocón, Peredo was widely followed

== Books ==
- Peredo Total (2018)
- Las caletas de los mundiales (2014)
- Los 500 datos más caletas de los mundiales (2010)

== Filmography ==
- Once machos (2017)

== Death ==
Daniel Peredo died of a heart attack on February 19, 2018, in Lima, Peru, at the age of 48.
