= Earthrise (film) =

- Directed by: Emmanuel Vaughan-Lee
- Produced by: Adam Loften; Emmanuel Vaughan-Lee
- Starring: Frank Borman; James Lovell; Bill Anders
- Production company: Global Oneness Project
- Release date: 2018
- Running time: 30 minutes
- Country: United States
- Language: English

Earthrise is a 2018 documentary film by Emmanuel Vaughan-Lee. The film tells the story of the first image captured of the Earth from space in 1968, as recalled by the Apollo 8 astronauts. The film premiered at Tribeca Film Festival on April 21, 2018 and had its online premiere on the New York Times Op-Docs and the PBS Series, POV, on October 2, 2018. In 2018, it won the Audience Award at AFI DOCS and won Best Documentary Short at Raindance Film Festival. After airing on PBS, it was nominated for an Emmy for Outstanding Short Documentary at the 40th News and Documentary Emmy Award.

== Synopsis ==
Earthrise tells the story of the first image captured of the Earth from space in 1968. Told solely by the Apollo 8 astronauts, the film recounts their experiences and memories and explores the beauty, awe, and grandeur of the Earth against the blackness of space. This iconic image, Earthrise, had a powerful impact on the astronauts and the world, offering a perspective that transcended national, political, and religious boundaries. Told 50 years later, Earthrise compels us to remember this shift and to reflect on the Earth as a shared home.

== Release ==
The film premiered at Tribeca Film Festival on April 21, 2018 and had its online premiere on the New York Times Op-Docs and the PBS Series, POV, on October 2, 2018. On October 22, 2018, the film will have its North American, TV broadcast premiere on POV. It has screened at festivals worldwide, including: Tribeca Film Festival, AFI Docs, Raindance Film Festival, Camden International Film Festival, Mill Valley Film Festival, DOC NYC, Rhode Island International Film Festival, Hot Springs Documentary Film Festival, Denver Film Festival, InScience International Science Film Festival Nijmegen, Jackson Hole Science Media Awards, and Original Thinkers, among others.

== Reception ==
POV called Earthrise “one of the most profoundly moving works of 2018. It speaks to our shared humanity, our challenging present, and our future”. It inspired the This American Life episode, and was featured in Act 1 of “The Not-So-Great-Unknown,” which aired August 25, 2018
