= Jonathan Hansler =

English actor

- Hansler on set during the filming of Evil's Evil Cousin in 2015
- Born: John Hansler Brittan; Tidworth, Wiltshire, England
- Occupations: Actor, voice actor, comedian, writer

Jonathan Hansler is an English actor. He has worked in theatre, film and television.

== Career ==
=== Television ===
Hansler's television roles include the aristocrat Colin Tennant in the 2005 TV movie The Queen's Sister, Mr Pelham in the BBC drama series Hotel Babylon and the announcer in the sitcom My Family.

Hansler played radio journalist Pete Clifford in EastEnders in September 2018.

=== Theatre ===
Hansler's played the character of Lance in the 2007 revival of Toast with the Hull Truck Theatre and also Hugh Paddick in the 50th Anniversary tour of Round the Horne. In 2016, Hansler appeared in the West End production of Stephen Jeffreys' play The Libertine with Dominic Cooper, which opened at the Theatre Royal Haymarket after a short run at the Theatre Royal Bath. In 2017, Hansler appeared as General Tilney in an adaptation of Jane Austen's Northanger Abbey with the Theatre Royal, Bury St Edmunds, which toured the UK.

From 2017 to 2018, Hansler played both Captain Hook and Mr. Darling in the Theatre Royal Winchester's production of Peter Pan, for which he received critical acclaim.

In 2021 he led the re-opening of the White Bear Theatre, playing George Sanders in Villain in Tinseltown by David Harrold.

=== Other work ===
Hansler provided the voice of Lucius Malfoy and other characters in three of the Harry Potter video games: Harry Potter and the Order of the Phoenix, Harry Potter and the Half-Blood Prince and Harry Potter and the Deathly Hallows – Part 1.

Hansler played the lead character in a 2013 advertising campaign for Cadbury.

== Filmography ==
Year	Title	Role	Notes
2005	The Queen's Sister	Colin Tennant	TV movie
2006	My Family	Announcer	TV series
2007	Harry Potter and the Order of the Phoenix	Lucius Malfoy	Video game
2009	Hotel Babylon	Mr Pelham	TV series
2009	Harry Potter and the Half-Blood Prince	Male Death Eater	Video game
2010	Harry Potter and the Deathly Hallows – Part 1	Lucius Malfoy	Video game
2010	The Drummond Will	Constable	Feature film
2012	The Grind	Comedian	Feature film
2015	Young Hunters: The Beast of Bevendean	Albert	Feature film
2016	Evil's Evil Cousin	Pastor Bob	Short film
2018	EastEnders	Pete Clifford	TV
2022	The Fourth Musketeer	Old d'Dartagnan	Feature film
2024	The Slave and the Sorcerer	Akaris	Feature film
2024	Bogieville	Crawford	
