= Eggs Over Easy: Black Women & Fertility =

Eggs Over Easy: black women & Fertility
- Directed by: Chiquita Lockley
- Written by: Chiquita Lockley
- Produced by: Chiquita Lockley (executive producer); Phylicia Fant (executive producer); Keshia Knight Pulliam (executive producer); D'Angela Proctor (executive producer); Karen Cook (producer); Terrance Crowley (producer)
- Narrated by: Keshia Knight Pulliam
- Release date: January 4, 2022 (OWN)

Eggs Over Easy: Black Women & Fertility is a 2022 documentary film that discusses fertility, including how race in America affects fertility in black women, including underlying medical conditions, miscarriages, and maternal mortality. It also discusses solutions for infertility such as IVF treatments and sperm and egg donations.

The documentary features Andra Day, Keshia Knight Pulliam, Kellee Stewart and other women who share their personal stories related to fertility. The documentary was released on the Oprah Winfrey Network in 2022 and was written, directed, and produced by Chiquita Lockley.
