= The Empire in Africa =

2006 French documentary film

- Directed by: Philippe Diaz
- Produced by: Philippe Diaz
- Cinematography: Henri Rossier
- Edited by: Philippe Diaz
- Release date: 24 January 2006 (U.S.)
- Running time: 87 min.
- Languages: English; Kikuyu

The Empire in Africa, is a 2006 French documentary film directed and produced by Philippe Diaz.

The Filming was completed in 2002 with a terrible end due to another film shot at the same time. The film received mixed reviews from critics and screened at several international film festivals.

== Plot ==
The film deals with tragedy of the 11-year civil war in Sierra Leone. The film has used natural brutal events and tragedies along with the narratives and other international discussions as well as footage from the Sierra Leone, United Nations, and European community. The film also described the life of Sierra Leone and its people eleven years later, where about 70 000 men, women and children had been killed during the civil war. The civil war in Sierra Leone is also described as one of 20th century's most brutal conflicts, and one of the UN's most inglorious humanitarian failures.

== Cast ==
- Ahmad Tejan Kabbah – President of Sierra Leone
- Foday Sankoh – Leader of the Revolutionary United Front
- Mike Lamin – Revolutionary United Front commander
- Zainab Hawa Bangura – Representative of civil society
- Hassan Hujazi – Rice importer
- Joseph Melrose – United States Ambassador to Sierra Leone
- Steve Crossman – United Kingdom Acting Ambassador
- James Jonah – Minister of Finances - Sierra Leone Ambassador to the UN
- Michael Fletcher – Honorary French Consul
- Julius Spencer – Minister of Information
- Hinga Norman – Minister of Defense
- Pascal Lefort – Action Against Hunger
- Pascal Lefort – Action Against Hunger
- S.Y.B. Rogers – Revolutionary United Front spokesperson
- M.A. Carol – President of the Chamber of Commerce
- Johnny Paul Koroma – Major of the Sierra-Leone Army
- Gabriel Kpamber – ECOMOG Commander-in-chief
- John Weston – UK Ambassador to the UN
- Kofi Annan – Secretary-General of the UN
- Bill Richardson – US Ambassador to the UN
- Philippe Maughan – European Community
