= Eleven Males 2 =

- Theatrical release poster
- Directed by: Aldo Miyashiro
- Written by: Marco Paulo Melendez; Aldo Miyashiro
- Produced by: Aldo Miyashiro
- Starring: Aldo Miyashiro; Érika Villalobos; Pietro Sibille; Cristian Rivero; Yaco Esquenazi
- Production company: AMA Films
- Distributed by: Cinecolor Films
- Release date: February 14, 2019
- Running time: 105 minutes
- Country: Peru
- Language: Spanish

Eleven Males 2 (Spanish: Once machos 2) is a 2019 Peruvian sports comedy film directed by Aldo Miyashiro and written by Miyashiro and Marco Paulo Melendez. It is a sequel to the 2017 Peruvian film Eleven Males. It stars Aldo Miyashiro, Pietro Sibille, André Silva and Cristian Rivero. It premiered on February 14, 2019, in Peruvian theaters.

== Synopsis ==
The Once Machos will have to face off on the field against the "Villain", who has kidnapped their children. Now, only a victory will make them see their creatures alive again.

== Cast ==
The actors participating in this film are:

- Aldo Miyashiro as Alejandro
- Pietro Sibille as 'Mono'
- Cristian Rivero as Cris
- Erika Villalobos as Beatriz
- André Silva as Andy
- Junior Silva as Junior
- Andrés Salas as 'Chato'
- Sebastian Monteghirfo as Sebas
- Pablo Villanueva “Melcochita” as 'Huapayita'
- Gilberto Nué as Gil
- Wendy Vásquez as Tatiana
- Natalie Vértiz as Natalia

== Production ==
The filming of the film began on July 10, 2018, and ended at the end of August 2018.

== Reception ==
Eleven Males 2 drew more than 67,000 viewers on its first day in theaters. In its opening weekend, the film drew 179,000 viewers to the theater. At the end of the year, the film attracts more than 650,000 spectators to the cinema, becoming the most watched Peruvian film of 2019.

== Future ==
After the success of the sequel, a third part was announced, which will begin filming in 2020, along with a new series titled Once machos, la serie (Eleven males, the series) to premiere in 2020. but they were never released, and it is unknown what happened to these projects. In October 2021, a real soccer team called Once Machos FC was formed.
