= Fant v. The City of Ferguson =

Fant v. The City of Ferguson is a putative class action claim filed on May 26, 2015 against the City of Ferguson, Missouri. The claims were pursuant of 42 U.S.C. § 1983, where the code lays out the applicability, or lack thereof, for the legal deprivation of rights. The multiple plaintiffs claimed that the City of Ferguson had violated their constitutional rights, namely the 4th, 6th, and 14th amendments.

== Background ==
The named Plaintiffs are 11 individuals who allege that they have been jailed by the city (City of Ferguson) on numerous occasions because they were unable to pay fines owed from traffic and other minor violations. The plaintiffs claim they were not afforded counsel or even questioned about when they would able to pay back the fines that they were incarcerated for. They also claimed that they were jailed indefinitely, being held in unsanitary conditions. They filed this action pursuant to 42 U.S.C. § 1983, asserting claims under the 4th, 6th, and 14th amendments. The plaintiffs seek to represent a declaratory and injunctive (putting a stop to) class of "all persons who currently owe or who will incur debts to the City... from fines, fees, costs, or surcharges arising from cases prosecuted by the City"

== Plaintiff's claims ==
The plaintiffs asserted that they had been jailed by the city on numerous occasions because of their inability to pay cash bonds, fines, or other debts that were owed to the city. They alleged that the violations of the Constitution occurred due to the city's policies and practices on how to conduct the municipal court system. Fant and her constituents claimed that they were not afforded an attorney, which violates the sixth amendment which guarantees individuals the right of criminal defendants, including the right to a public trial without unnecessary delay, the right to a lawyer, the right to an impartial jury, and the right to know who your accusers are and the nature of the charges and evidence against you. They also claimed that they had been held in jail indefinitely in overcrowded and unsanitary conditions, and were not released until a friend or family member had paid the monetary debt in full.

== Defendant's defense ==
In response, the defendant, The City of Ferguson, moved to dismiss the claims on sovereign immunity grounds. This idea of sovereign immunity refers to the fact that the government cannot be sued without its consent. To evade this doctrine, the plaintiff's allegations must contain sufficient factual matter accepted as true to state a claim to relief that is plausible on its face. This standard of review "simply calls for enough fact to raise a reasonable expectation that discovery will reveal evidence of the claim". In laymen terms, this boils down to the idea that before the judges can review such a case and decide on it, they must utilize their judicial experience and common sense to consider the plausibility of the plaintiff's claims as a whole, not just the plausibility of an individual's allegation. This case is a class action suit, that means that there are multiple plaintiffs who are countering multiple claims at the defendant. With that idea in mind, it is important to recognize that by highlighting this precedent set in Zoltek Corp. v. Structural Polymer Grp., the defendants are insuring that no individual claim is enough for a conviction. All claims must be deemed plausible, not just a singular example. If this standard is not met, then the case should not proceed for further litigation.

== Case decision ==
The decision for this case was presented by Justice Audrey G. Flessing, who is a United States District Judge. As highlighted above in the Defendant's defense, the City of Ferguson was attempting to have this declaratory injunction dismissed. For this case such a request was both granted and denied in part. The court docket conclusion reads, "For the reasons set forth above, It is hereby ordered that Defendant City of Ferguson's motion to dismiss or alternatively to strike for a more definite statement is granted in part and denied in part. The motion is granted as follows: the words "First" and "Eighth" in paragraph 16 of the complaint are stricken; Count Five is dismissed; and Plaintiffs' Fourth Amendment claim in Count Six is dismissed. Except as set forth above, the motion is denied". All of this legal jargon boils down to the notion that part of the Plaintiff's claims have been upheld, while some, like the Fourth Amendment claim, were dismissed. This case has many reiterations and retrials, with litigation still continuing into 2018.

== Social importance ==
This class action suit serves as a good example of a possible problem in the United States; the large increase of private debtor prisons. A debtors' prison is a prison for people who are unable to pay a debt. Destitute individuals would be incarcerated until they could collect the necessary payment to pay off their respective debts. For many democratic nations, including the United States, such practices have been outlawed. Yet, as highlighted by the ACLU website, "Nearly two centuries ago, the United States formally abolished the incarceration of people who failed to pay off debts. Yet, recent years have witnessed the rise of modern-day debtors' prisons—the arrest and jailing of poor people for failure to pay legal debts they can never hope to afford, through criminal justice procedures that violate their most basic rights". In 1833, the United States ended the longstanding tradition of debtors’ prison. Prior to that time, citizens were placed in prison if they were unable to pay a debt. Over 100 years later, the U.S. courts dealt with this question again in Bearden v. Georgia (1983), a Supreme Court decision which held that it is unconstitutional to imprison those that cannot afford to pay their debt or restitution in criminal cases. The decision in Bearden v. Georgia ruled that debtors can be incarcerated only if the act of not paying their debt or restitution was “willful". Despite this ruling, poor people have continued to be jailed for not paying their debts — and the trend is increasing. This issue is becoming more harrowing for citizens living at or below the poverty line. Because such incarceration patterns are growing in prevalence, organizations such as Equal Justice Under Law, have begun the conversation surrounding debtors prisons and their possible consequences for society.
