= Ek Chup =

- Directed by: Sonya V. Kapoor
- Written by: Sonya V. Kapoor
- Produced by: Amrita Mendonza; Sonya V. Kapoor
- Starring: Joy Sengupta; Mona Singh; Chahat Tewani
- Distributed by: M5 Entertainment Pvt. Ltd.
- Release date: 25 November 2022
- Running time: 15 minutes
- Country: India
- Language: Hindi

Ek Chup is an Indian Hindi-language short drama film. It was written and directed by Sonya V. Kapoor. It is produced by Amrita Mendonza and Sonya V. Kapoor with the production house M5 Entertainment Private Limited. It stars Joy Sengupta, Mona Singh and Chahat Tewani in pivotal roles. The short film premiered on 25 November 2022 on the OTT platform Disney+ Hotstar.

== Cast ==
- Joy Sengupta as Dr Shekhar
- Mona Singh as Dr Radhika
- Chahat Tewani as Sara

== Plot ==
The short story is during the time of COVID-19 pandemic lockdown with domestic abuse and violence against women when the disease caught Dr Shekhar (Joy Sengupta), Dr Radhika (Mona Singh) and daughter Sara (Chahat Tewani).

== Release ==
M5 Entertainment officially launched the teaser on 15 September 2022 on YouTube channel and it will be released on OTT platform Disney+ Hotstar on 25 November 2022.

== Reception ==
=== Critical review ===
Archika Khurana of Times of India has given 3.5/5 stars stating that the short film is a moving portrayal of the "Shadow Pandemic". Performance of Mona Singh is outstanding while Joy Sengupta justified his character forcing to dislike him. The direction and the screenplay were good, on the other hand dialogue writing could be better.
