= Eunuchs: India's Third Gender =

1991 ethnographic film

Eunuchs: India's Third Gender is a 1991 ethnographic film documenting the lives of two castrated men, Kiran and Dinesh, who share their experiences after undergoing castration. The film covers a variety of topics, including gender, abuse of power, sexuality, homophobia, discrimination, and cultural anthropology.

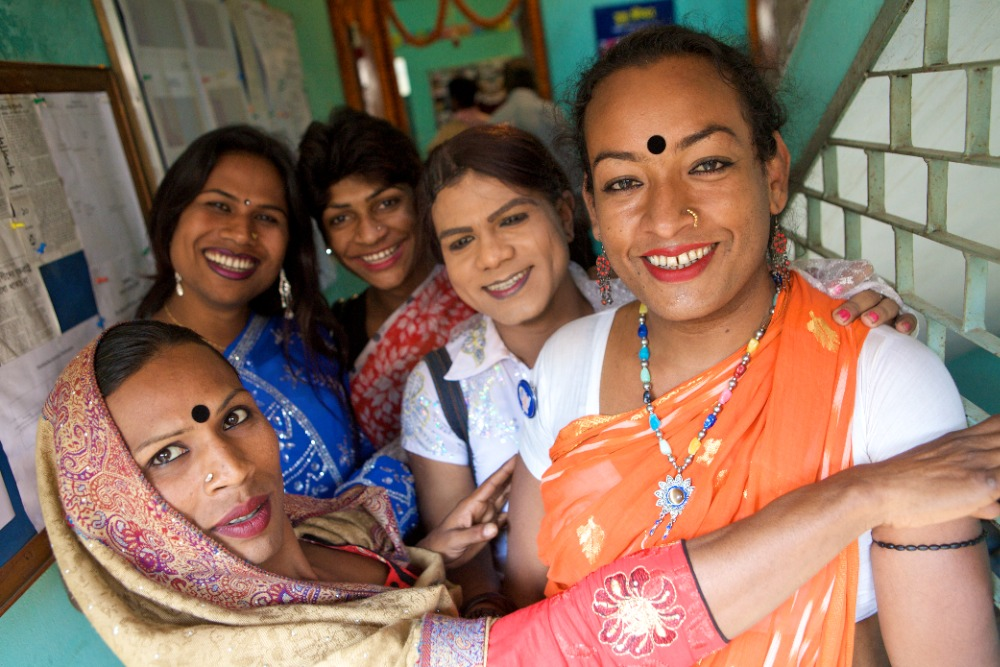
A group of eunuchs (a.k.a. Hijras) group together for a photo.

== Synopsis ==
The ethnographic film uses a linear narrative covering three main themes: love, history, and exclusion within the Indian society, all presented in a non-chronological order.

Creating and maintaining an acceptable relationship with a eunuch is difficult, but Kiran and Dinesh loved each other very much. Their love is so strong that once Dinesh leaves for work as a driver, Kiran cannot function without him. She doesn't eat without Dinesh and only happy when they are together. Although eunuchs may live freely in India, they are subject to a widespread discrimination. Additionally, romantic relationships among eunuchs are considered a taboo.

Kiran has gone through castration to live fully as a eunuch. Eunuch castration is a highly symbolic act, and the surgical removal of male genitalia is prominent in the eunuch gender and community. Castration is usually performed after living in the eunuch community for many years. Although the community creates a sense of belonging, members are a subject to marginalization and discrimination brought upon them by the rest of society. However, many do not go through castration, feminizing surgery, hormone medication, growing hair, donning female attire, or other aspects of living as a eunuch.

Kiran lives in Kathiawar, a place where eunuchs are not welcome. Harish, an aspiring eunuch, frequents Kiran's home and has been taken under his wing. Harish had kept his desire to be a eunuch, a secret from his wife and children in fear of ruining his relationship with them. His family was not open to eunuchs and so he was worried that they would not accept his wishes. Eight months earlier, Harish's wife had left him and their children to go live with her parents. When she came back, Harish had almost gone through the process of castration. Harish's wife is at a crossroads. She is aware that he will never stop living as a eunuch, but the negative social stigma around gender is something she cannot fully accept.

In the state of Rajasthan, a eunuch community exists, overseen by Sharada Bai, the guru, and leader of over one-hundred eunuchs. She lives in a mansion with eight disciples and holds the power to appoint one-hundred other eunuchs from neighbouring territories. Eunuchs possess strong family ties, and being a disciple in Sharada Bai's family means she becomes a parent. The mansion in which the eunuchs lived is lavished with a rich history and cannot be sold or destroyed. Looking over the mansion is a sign of honour to the past and the history of a eunuch's purpose. The tradition of greeting the guru in the morning by bowing and touching the feet is a sign of respect, alongside castration, which is a sign of loyalty. Sharada Bai is claimed to have palliative effects on her family members, who look to the guru for guidance and hope.

Most cities in modern India aren't accepting of eunuchs, mostly due to cultural and religious prejudices. In Bombay, the guru Regamath lives with fourteen eunuch disciples. Bombay is more expensive than Rajasthan, and the eunuchs' only source of income is prostitution. Every evening the eunuchs head to the red-light district to sell themselves. Along with prostitution, eunuchs also engage in begging and clapping to intimidate the public into giving them money. They also lift their frilly garments to show their genitalia as another form of intimidation. This behaviour and occupation is one that causes more resentments and discriminations between modern eunuchs and modern Indian society.

== Production ==
Eunuchs: India's Third Gender was produced by assistant producers Surinder Puri and Aruna Har Parsed. Parsed also narrates the film. BBC Elstree Centre, in the United Kingdom, is the production company behind the film. Michael Yorke, an anthropologist, directed and originated the concept for the documentary film.

== Background ==
Director Michael Yorke was always fascinated with Indian culture. In 1962, he spent time hitchhiking in India, and he experienced the society, culture, and people close up. Yorke's main goal in all of his ethnographies is for the audience to explore the "other". The success of Eunuchs: India's Third Gender derived from Yorke's ongoing fascination and excitement which is evident in the ethnography. According to Yorke, eunuch subjects are intelligent and analytical. Whenever he visited India for his fieldwork, they were fascinating, welcoming, and informative. A western observer like Yorke is always treated kindly by the eunuch community, which played a large part in successfully creating the film.

A film review conducted by anthropologist Pauline Kolenda discussed Yorke's film along with Jareena: Portrait of a Hijda. Both films display the eunuch or hijra community in South Asia. Eunuchs: India's Third Gender along with Jareena: Portrait of a Hijda broadened discussion on sexuality and gender.

== Release ==
The film was released in 1991 and was televised on the BBC Network. It was later released on DVD and can be found on various university resource engines and in digital archives.

Thirty years after the original 1991 debut, Yorke did a screening of the film at Lamaakan's open theatre.

== Reception ==
Eunuchs: India's Third Gender was Michael Yorke's most significant success. However, public reception of the film was mixed.

== See also ==
- Hijra
- India
- Ethnography
- Castration
