= Eleven Males =

- Theatrical release poster
- Directed by: Aldo Miyashiro
- Written by: Aldo Miyashiro; Gilberto Nué; Haysen Percovich; Marco Paulo Melendez
- Story by: Aldo Miyashiro
- Produced by: César Fajardo; Gilberto Nué; Aldo Miyashiro
- Starring: Pietro Sibille; Aldo Miyashiro; Vanessa Saba; Érika Villalobos; Cristian Rivero; Yaco Eskenazi; André Silva; Daniel Peredo; Junior Silva
- Cinematography: César Fajardo
- Music by: José San Miguel; Eduardo San Miguel
- Production company: AMA Films
- Distributed by: Cinecolor Perú
- Release date: August 10, 2017
- Running time: 104 minutes
- Country: Peru
- Language: Spanish

Eleven Males (Spanish: Once machos) is a 2017 Peruvian sports comedy film directed, co-written, produced and starred by Aldo Miyashiro.

== Synopsis ==
The story of a neighborhood that bets on a football match the only thing they have in life, their houses. Once machos (Eleven males), a neighborhood team accustomed only to losing, will face Los Diamantes, a professional soccer team belonging to Jaime, former neighbor and villain of the story, who intends to knock down the entire neighborhood to build the most impressive shopping center in the country.

== Cast ==
- Pietro Sibille as 'Mono'
- André Silva as Andy (Andi)
- Andrés Salas as 'Chato'
- Luigi Monteghirfo as Luis
- Sebastian Monteghirfo as Sebastián (Sebas)
- Martín Arredondo as 'Dientes'
- Daniel Peredo as Daniel (Dani) / Narrator
- Iván Chávez as Chávez
- Cristian Rivero as Cristian (Cris)
- Gilberto Nué as Gilberto (Gil)
- Junior Silva as Junior
- Yaco Eskenazi as Mikael
- Aldo Miyashiro as Alejandro
- Carlos Gassols as Mr. Carlos
- Erika Villalobos as Beatriz
- Vanessa Saba as Cristina
- Wendy Ramos as Tatiana
- Amparo Brambilla as Amparo (La Amparo)
- César Valer as Don Amador
- Américo Zuñiga as Don Ulises
- Daniela Nunes as Mía
- Abril Cárdenas as Camila
- Mariano García-Rosell as Adrián
- Brando Gallesi as Bruno
- Fabiana Valcárcel as Fernanda
- Ricardo Valverde as 'Pájaro-Perro'
- Nicolás Argolo as Nico
- Yiddá Eslava as Yiddá
- Julián Zucchi as Julián (Juli)
- Eddie Fleischman as Himself
- Haysen Percovich as Jaime
- Sonia Seminario as Mrs. Luzmila

== Reception ==
=== Critical reception ===
In a review of the newspaper El Comercio, critic Sebastián Pimentel: gave the film a very low rating and described that "the psychological content is reduced to a matter of actions obvious, set phrases or grimaces of café-theater. The possibility of a popular, intelligent and imaginative Peruvian cinema is once again far from the big screen".

=== Box-office ===
In its billboard debut, Eleven Males achieved 45,000 viewers; becoming the most watched Peruvian film of 2017, surpassing "Cebiche de Tiburón", "Av. Larco" and "Gemelos sin cura".

== Sequels ==
With the success of Once machos, a sequel entitled Eleven Males 2 was announced, this time without the participation of Daniel Peredo, who had died in early 2018. After the success of the sequel, the realization of a third part was confirmed, along with a new series titled Once machos, la serie (Eleven males, the series) to premiere in 2020. but they were never released, and it is unknown what happened to these projects.
