= Gene Fant Jr. =

Dr. Gene Fant, Jr.
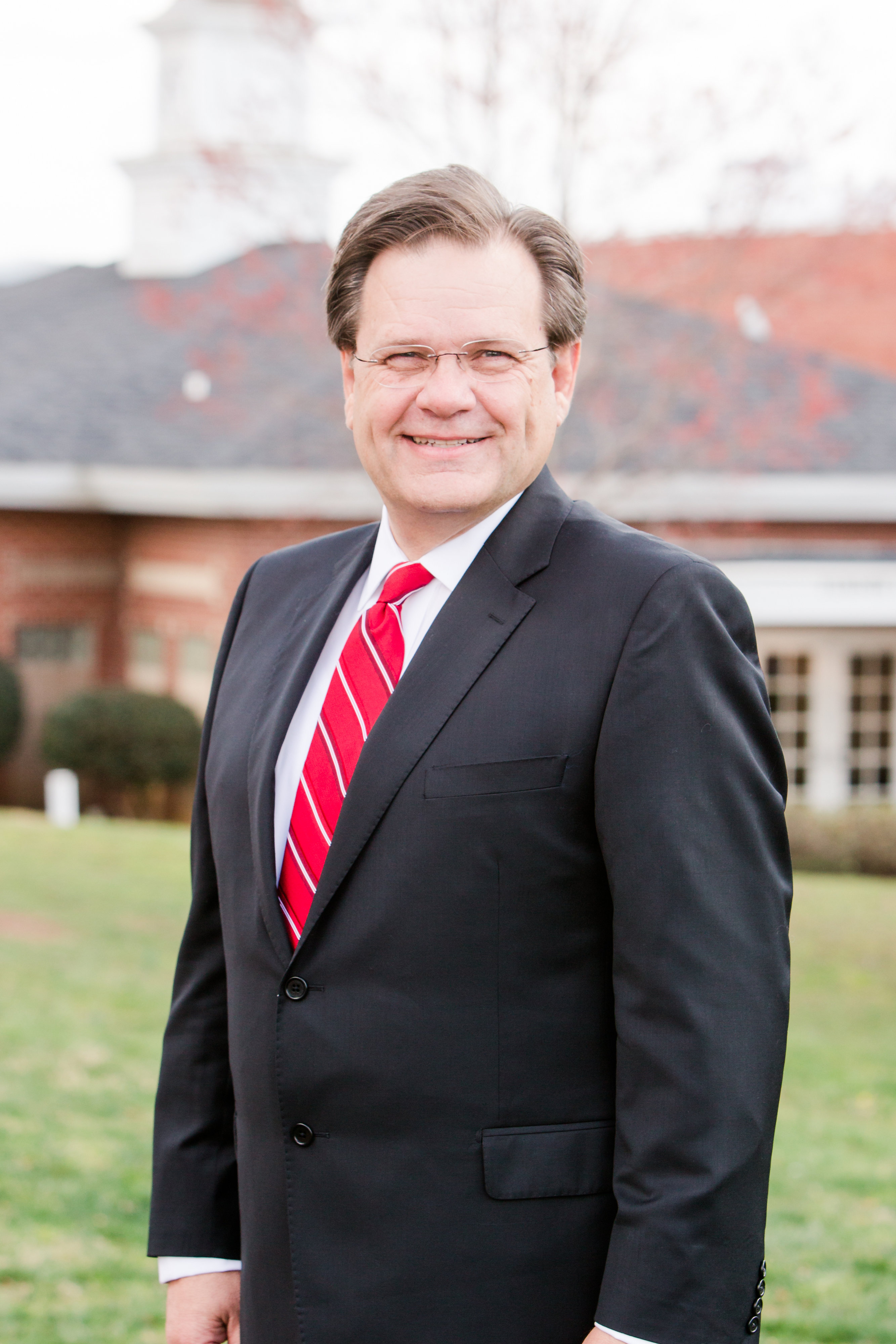

8th President of North Greenville University
- In office June 1, 2017 to Present

Personal details
- Born: June 30, 1963 (age 62)
- Spouse: Lisa (Williams) Fant
- Children: Ethan and Emily Fant
- Profession: College Administrator

Gene Fant Jr. (born 1963), a leader in Christian higher education and prolific writer, is the current president of North Greenville University, which is affiliated with the South Carolina Baptist Convention and located in Tigerville, South Carolina. Gene was elected as president by the university's board of trustees and officially began his term on June 1, 2017. Gene became the university's first president to be selected with the assistance of a third-party executive search firm. He holds more academic degrees than any previous president at the institution.

== Early life and career ==
Gene was born in Laurel, Mississippi, where his grandfather preached on one side of town and his father on the other. When Gene was four years old, his father felt called to missions and moved the family to Upstate New York to plant churches.

When Gene was 11, his family moved again, this time to Hampton, Virginia, where his father, Gene C. Fant Sr., served as pastor at Ivy Memorial Baptist Church. When Gene's father travelled to preach revivals, the whole family travelled along with him to provide the worship. Gene played bass and his younger brother, Steve, played guitar to accompany their gospel singer-songwriter mother, Ramona Faith Fant, whose stage name was Mona Faith.

== Education ==
After graduating from high school in 1981, Gene went on to earn his bachelor's degree in anthropology at James Madison University in 1984 and his master's degree in English at Old Dominion University in 1987. He then began teaching in Gloucester County Public Schools in Virginia, where he met his future wife, Lisa Williams.

In 1991, Gene became the third generation of his family to graduate from the New Orleans Baptist Theological Seminary, graduating with an M.Div. in Biblical Languages, after which he completed his Ph.D. in English Literature at the University of Southern Mississippi in 1995. He also completed a post-doctoral M.Ed. from the University of Southern Mississippi that same year. In 2011, Gene completed the Institute in Educational Management at the Harvard University Graduate School of Education.

== Employment in Higher Education ==
- Assistant Director, Mississippi Institute on Law-Related Education, University of Southern Mississippi (1994-1995)
- Assistant Professor of English, Mississippi College (1995-2002, English Department Chair 1999–2002)
- Associate Professor / Professor of English, Union University (2002-2014, English Department Chair 2002–2006, Dean of the College of Arts and Sciences 2006–2010, Vice President for Academics 2010–2012, Executive Vice President for Academic Affairs 2012–2014)
- Provost and Professor of English, Palm Beach Atlantic University (2014-2017)
- President, North Greenville University (2017–present)

In addition to these positions, Gene was one of the original curriculum developers of the Impact 360 Institute. Gene currently serves on the institute's board of directors.

== Personal life ==
Gene has been married to Lisa Fant (formerly Lisa Williams) since 1989. Lisa holds a master's degree in English from the University of Southern Mississippi. Over the past 18 years, she has primarily worked as a stay-at-home mom to their adult twin children: Ethan and Emily.

== Selected works ==
=== Books ===
- The Liberal Arts: A Student’s Guide. Crossway Academic, 2012.
- God as Author: A Biblical Approach to Narrative. Broadman & Holman Academic, 2010.
- Expectant Moments: Devotions for Expectant Parents (with Lisa Fant). Zondervan, 1999. Paperback edition released 2002. Kindle edition released 2010.
- Petrarchan Hagiography, Gender, and Subjectivity in Lady Mary Wroth's Pamphilia to Amphilanthus. Published by the Graduate School, University of Southern Mississippi, 1995.

=== Selected book chapters ===
- "Teaching the Humanities in a Christian Context" in a forthcoming volume edited by David S. Dockery; Crossway, exp. 2018.
- "Martin Luther and Contemporary Christian Higher Education" in Reformation 500: How the Greatest Revival since Pentecost Continues to Shape the World Today, eds. Ray Van Neste and J. Michael Garrett, B & H Academic, 2017.
- "How the Cooperative Program Put a Baptistery in my Garage: The Legacy of M. E. Dodd" in From the Cloud of Witnesses: Founders Day Addresses at Union University, ed. Ray Van Neste, BorderStone Press, 2016.
- "Convictional Courage: The Leadership of David S. Dockery" in Convictional Civility: Engaging the Culture in the 21st Century, eds. C. Ben Mitchell, Carla D. Sanderson, and Gregory A. Thornbury, B & H Academic, 2015.
- "Give Me that Power: Secular Writers' Fascination with the King James Version of the Bible" in KJV 400: Legacy and Impact, ed. Ray Van Neste, BorderStone Press, 2012.
- "Core Curriculum in a Christian Context" in A Handbook for Christian Higher Education, ed. David S. Dockery, B & H Academic, 2012.
- "A Blind Man, an Idiot, and a Prig: Faulkner's Disdain for the Reader" in Literature and the Reader, ed. Michael J. Meyers. Amsterdam: Rodopi Press, 2005.

=== Blogs ===
- Contributing blogger (2008-2014) and essayist (18 essays since 2001) at The Chronicle of Higher Education.
- Contributing blogger at First Things' "Evangel" (2009-2013) and "First Thoughts" (2013-2015).
