= Elae Airy in Busan =

- Film poster
- Directed by: Sompong Kunaprathom
- Screenplay by: Weerawat Chayochaiyakorn; Watcharaphong Pattam
- Starring: Il Hong-min; Atcharee Srisuk; Arthit Somnoi; Sitthidet Bammanee; Petchtai Wongkamlao; Akaradet Yodchampa; Kwannapa Ruangsri; Duangruedee Boonbumrung; Praepetch Udomsartporn
- Music by: Banana Sound Studio
- Production company: Ponglang Saon Film
- Distributed by: M Studio
- Release date: March 26, 2026 (Thailand)
- Running time: 100 minutes
- Country: Thailand
- Languages: Isan, Thai
- Budget: 20 million baht
- Box office: 5.10 million baht (National)

Elae Airy in Busan (Thai: อีแหล่ แอรี่ เกาหลี โอปป้า; also known as Elae Airy Korea Oppa) is a 2026 Thai comedy-drama film directed and produced by Sompong Kunaprathom and produced by Ponglang Saon Film. The film is inspired by true events of Isan people traveling to South Korea as migrant workers to support their families and pay off debts, depicting their struggle for survival. It stars Il Hong-min, Atcharee Srisuk, Arthit Somnoi, Sitthidet Bammanee, Petchtai Wongkamlao, Akaradet Yodchampa, Kwannapa Ruangsri, Duangruedee Boonbumrung, and Praepetch Udomsartporn. The film was released on March 26, 2026.

== Production ==
The production team spent approximately two years filming, with several locations in Busan, South Korea, depicting the lives of Thai workers abroad.

== Promotion ==
In late January 2026, a teaser trailer was released, which gained significant social media attention. On February 27 of the same year, the main poster and the official cast list were officially unveiled by the creators.
