= Ema Nudar Umanu =

- Directed by: Thomas Henning; Jonas Rusumalay Diaz
- Written by: Thomas Henning; Jonas Rusumalay Diaz
- Produced by: Jonas Rusumalay Diaz
- Starring: Apo Quintao
- Cinematography: Giovanni C. Lorusso
- Edited by: Lucy McCallum
- Music by: Etson Caminha; Liam Barton
- Production company: Malkriadu Cinema
- Release date: 16 August 2018 (MIFF)
- Running time: 70 minutes
- Country: East Timor
- Language: Tetum
- Budget: $7,000 AUD / $5,000 USD

Ema Nudar Umanu (transl. "Person Being/in the Nature of a Human") is a 2018 East Timorese experimental fantasy film written and directed by Thomas Henning, an Australian filmmaker, and Jonas Rusumalay Diaz, who is also its producer. It is the first feature film of the film collective Malkriadu Cinema, and is among the first feature films to be produced by East Timor, after Beatriz's War and Abdul & José. The film premiered at the Melbourne International Film Festival on 16 August 2018.

== Cast ==
- Apo Quintao as Tokadór
- Lola Bety Pires as the Spirit ("Mate-klamar")
- Tuta Monteiro Pires as Ela
- Juvencio da Silva Correia as Amanu
