= Emmanuel Vaughan-Lee =

British Sufi filmmaker, musician (1979-)

- Born: 1979 (age 45–46); London, England
- Education: Berklee College of Music
- Genres: Jazz
- Occupations: Filmmaker, composer, author, Sufi teacher, magazine editor
- Instrument: Acoustic bass
- Years active: 2001–present
- Labels: Fresh Sound New Talent, Emanjazz
- Awards: Emmy nomination, Peabody nomination, Webby Award winner

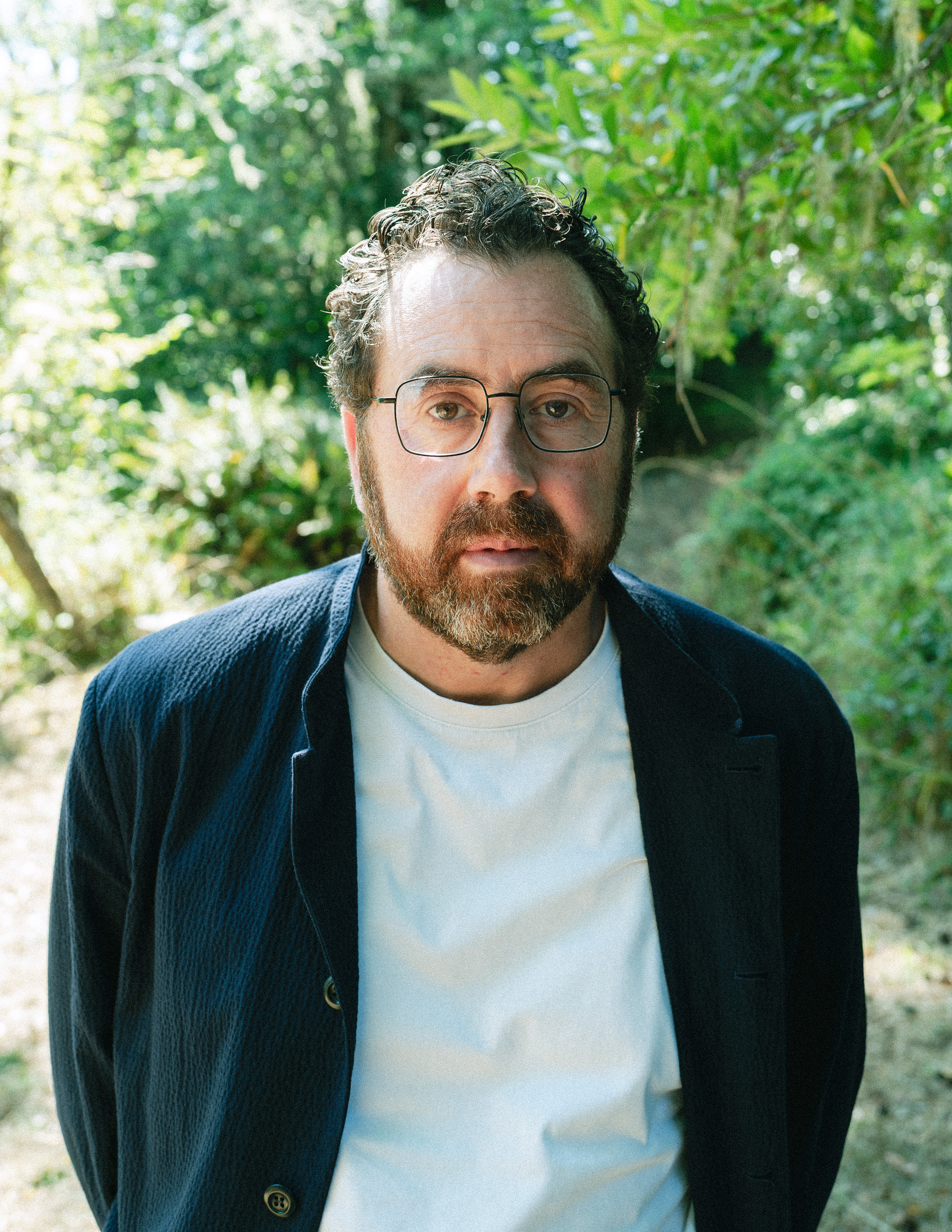
Emmanuel Vaughan-Lee, Inverness CA. 2025

Emmanuel Vaughan-Lee (born 1979 in London, England) is an Emmy and Peabody award nominated filmmaker, a composer, an author, and a Naqshbandi Sufi teacher. Emmanuel is the authorized successor of his father Llewellyn Vaughan-Lee, a Sufi mystic and lineage successor in the Naqshbandiyya-Mujaddidiyya Sufi Order.

== Biography ==
Vaughan-Lee was trained from the age of 15 by his father in the Naqshbandiyya-Mujaddidiyya Sufi Order. He attended Berklee College of Music in Boston to pursue musical studies in acoustic bass, improvisation and composition. After graduating from Berklee in 2001, Vaughan-Lee performed and recorded with numerous jazz artists and released two albums under his own name – Previous Misconceptions (2001 – Emanjazz) and Borrowed Time (2005 – Fresh Sound New Talent).

As a filmmaker he has directed and produced numerous award winning films including: The Nightingale's Song, Aloha Aina, The Last Ice Age, Taste of the Land, Earthrise, Elemental, Yukon Kings, Isle de Jean Charles, Marie's Dictionary, Soleá, Sanctuaries of Silence, The Atomic Tree, Laugh Clown Laugh and What Would it Look Like.

His films have played at festivals including: New York Film Festival, Tribeca Film Festival, SXSW Film Festival, Thessalonioki Documentary Film Festival, Hot Docs, Camden Intl Film Festival, Melbourne Intl Film Festival, San Francisco Intl Film Festival and Sheffield Documentary Film Festival. They have been featured and distributed on PBS and PBS's POV, National Geographic, The New York Times, The Atlantic, The New Yorker, and exhibited at the Smithsonian Museum and London Barbican.

He is the author of two books: Requiem, Invitation and Celebration: A Collection of Seasonal Practices (Emergence Press, 2025) and Remembering Earth: A Spiritual Ecology, forthcoming with Shambhala Publications summer 2026.

He is the founder, executive editor and podcast post of Emergence magazine, a National Magazine Award nominated and Webby winning publication exploring the threads connecting ecology, culture and spirituality.

== Filmography ==
- The Nightingale's Song (2024)
- Aloha Aina (2024)
- The Last Ice Age (2024)
- Taste of the Land (2024)
- The Atomic Tree (2019)
- Counter Mapping (2018)
- Earthrise (2018)
- Sanctuaries of Silence (2018)
- Soleá (2015)
- Laugh Clown Laugh (2014)
- Marie's Dictionary (2014)
- Isle de Jean Charles (2014)
- Yukon Kings (2013)
- Elemental (2012)
- A Thousand Suns (2009)
- What Would it Look Like (2009)
- Barrio de Paz (2007)
- The Land Owns Us (2007)
