= Evil's Evil Cousin =

- Directed by: Richard Peter Hunter
- Written by: Richard Peter Hunter
- Starring: Lionel Blair, Jonathan Hansler
- Cinematography: Tom Turley
- Music by: Dominic Sewell
- Distributed by: Odelay Films
- Release date: 2016
- Running time: 30 minutes
- Country: United Kingdom
- Language: English

Evil's Evil Cousin is a 2016 short film, written and directed by Richard Peter Hunter. It stars Lionel Blair as The Dapper Man, a singing and dancing character who serves as the narrator of the film and Jonathan Hansler as Pastor Bob, a preacher who is struggling with religion and has his faith tested by God.

== Cast ==
- Lionel Blair as The Dapper Man
- Jonathan Hansler as Pastor Bob
- Daniel Booroff as Terry and Evil Terry
- Lewis Allcock as Willy Williams
- Clifford Hume as Bruce
- Neil Summerville as Sebastian

== Reception ==
=== Critical response ===
In a summary of his favourite films at the Richmond International Film Festival in March 2017, Kevin Johnson of Richmond Magazine stated that "this short is hard to look away from; every minute there is something on screen to appreciate, be it the acting and cinematography, or the compelling script and comedy/drama balance".

=== Accolades ===
The film picked up awards in US film festivals, including the NYC Indie Film Awards, Around Films International Film Festival and Spotlight Horror Film Awards. The film first screened in the UK on 19 September 2016 at BAFTA, and then at the Let's All Be Free Film Festival in London in October 2016. The film was also part of the Fright Night Film Fest in Louisville, Kentucky.
