= East Germany (film) =

- Promotional release poster
- Directed by: Alonso Izaguirre
- Written by: Alonso Izaguirre
- Produced by: Luis Basurto
- Starring: Diana Daf Collazos
- Cinematography: Natalia Grande
- Edited by: Christiand Lu
- Production companies: Espacio y Tiempo; Badu Producciones; Alfalfa
- Release date: October 19, 2023 (Lima Alterna)
- Running time: 110 minutes
- Country: Peru
- Language: Spanish

East Germany (Spanish: Alemania Oriental) is a 2023 Peruvian drama film written and directed by Alonso Izaguirre. Starring Diana Daf Collazos as a mother who tries to protect and enjoy her family's vacations while wondering whether to migrate out of the country in the middle of the Peruvian Civil War or wait for the arrival of her husband who lives in East Germany.

== Synopsis ==
In the summer of 1987, Ana lives in an old house in Callao. She tries to spend an average vacation, but the difficult relationship with her children, whom she tries to protect from instability and violence in a country on the verge of economic and social debacle, overwhelms her to the point of exhaustion. Ana doubts whether to stay in Peru or start from scratch far from a crazy reality, although she is still waiting for the arrival of Carlos, exiled in East Germany to whom she is still married.

== Cast ==
- Diana Daf Collazos as Ana
- Yamile Caparó Cuba
- Flavio López
- Luccio Ramos
- Pilar Nuñez

== Production ==
Principal photography began on March 2, 2020, but was suspended due to the COVID-19 pandemic.

== Release ==
East Germany had its world premiere on October 19, 2023, as part of the Peruvian competition at the 4th Lima Alterna International Film Festival, then screened on October 21, 2023, at the 10th Trujillo Film Festival.

== Accolades ==
Year	Award / Festival	Category	Recipient	Result	Ref.
2023	4th Lima Alterna International Film Festival	Best Film in the Peruvian Competition	East Germany	Won	
2023	10th Trujillo Film Festival	Best Fiction Feature Film	East Germany	Nominated	
