= Earth's Man =

Earthman karn
- Directed by: Michael Curtiz
- Release date: 1917
- Country: Hungary
- Language: Hungarian

Earth's Man (Hungarian: A föld embere) is a 1917 Hungarian film directed by Michael Curtiz.
