= Phylicia Fant =

American music and entertainment industry executive

- Education: Spelman College
- Occupations: Music executive; Publicist; Film producer
- Years active: 2001–present
- Website: thepurpleagency.com

Phylicia Fant is an American music and entertainment industry executive. She is the head of music industry partnerships at Amazon Music and former head of urban music at Columbia Records. She is also the founder and CEO of The Purple Agency, a public relations and marketing agency. She also a produced the 2021 documentary film, Eggs Over Easy: Black Women & Fertility.

== Early life and education ==
Phylicia Fant is a native of Marietta, Georgia and a 2000 graduate of Spelman College. While attending Spelman, she interned for CNN (among other employers).

== Career ==
Fant started her career as a temp in the New York offices of the Universal Music Group (UMG). She later submitted her resume to the label's PR department and earned a job there. She held various roles at UMG, ultimately working her way up to vice president of media relations for Universal Motown Records in 2010. In her time there, she worked on publicity campaigns for a number of artists, including Erykah Badu, Amy Winehouse, Kid Cudi, and JoJo. While at Universal in 2008, Fant founded and became the CEO of her own public relations firm, The Purple Agency, which specializes in publicity, events, and lifestyle-marketing. Her work with the agency has included partnerships with a range of artists and businesses, including Daniel Casesar, Swizz Beatz, Luis Fonsi, Coca-Cola, and HBO.

Fant left Universal in 2011 to join the Warner Music Group as the vice president of publicity and lifestyle at Warner Bros. Records. She was promoted to senior vice president of publicity and lifestyle at the label in 2017. Over the course of her time at Warner, she oversaw global PR campaigns for acts like Prince, Gary Clark Jr., Bebe Rexha, and Drake's OVO Sound label (among others). By the time of her departure in 2018, she was the senior vice president of publicity and special projects.

In December 2018, Fant was named the co-head of urban music at Columbia Records alongside Shawn Holliday. In that role, Fant was tasked with leading campaigns for a roster of established artists including Beyoncé, Solange, and Leon Bridges and helping develop a number of new acts like Polo G, Chloe x Halle, and Lil Nas X. She left Columbia Records in 2022.

She was named to Billboard's Women in Music list in both 2019 and 2020. She was also honored at the 2021 ASCAP Women Behind the Music Event.

In addition to her music and PR work, Fant is also a producer on the 2021 documentary film, Eggs Over Easy: Black Women & Fertility. She was also named head of music industry partnerships at Amazon Music in March 2022.
