= End (film) =

- Edited by: Esfandyar Habibnejad
- Release date: 1984
- Country: Iran

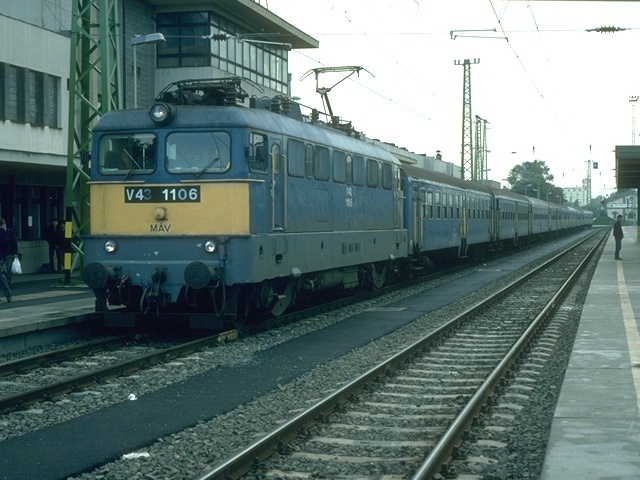
In this film, the contrast between development staying undeveloped is symbolised as fast moving trains and a poor child.

The End is a 1984 fiction film by Mahmoud Shoolizadeh. The film tells the story of a child who lives by the railways in the south of Tehran. It discusses inflation, unemployment, and social poverty as the major problems of modern Iran.

== Technical specifications and film crew ==
- 16mm, 17mins, Fiction, Iran, 1984
- Script writer and Director: Mahmoud Shoolizadeh
- Edit: Esfandyar Habibnejad
- Producer: Mahmoud Shoolizadeh (University of TV & Radio, Iran)
