= Ente Hridayathinte Vadakku Kizhakke Attathu =

- Directed by: Anup Narayanan
- Story by: Anup Narayanan
- Produced by: OpenCinemas
- Starring: Aneesha Ummer; Bibin Mathai; Vishnu Vidhyadharan
- Cinematography: Prasad Yhogi
- Edited by: Anup Narayanan
- Music by: Joel Johns
- Release date: 30 October 2017
- Running time: 23 minutes
- Country: India
- Language: Malayalam

Ente Hridayathinte Vadakku Kizhakke Attathu (English: At the North-East corner of my heart) is a 2017 Indian Malayalam short film directed by Anup Narayanan. Aneesha Ummer and Bibin Mathai are the main protagonists.

== Plot ==
The story is set up in a college where on the final day of the current batch of students. Priya and George are classmates. George is a young priest who has taken the vows of celibacy. After the dispersal of the class, Priya (Aneesha Ummer) meets George (Bibin Mathai), alone in the corridor and confesses her love to him. The rest of the film deals with an exploration of the young priest's mind and his emotional conflicts. Finally George and Priya meet after a few years at the baptism of Priya's twin daughters.

== Cast ==
- Aneesha Ummer as Priya
- Bibin Mathai as George
- Vishnu Vidhyadharan as Anil
- Roshan Anand as Scriptwriter
- Manoj M B as Professor
- Sangeeth Soman

Ente Hridayathinte Vadakku Kizhakke Attathu

Soundtrack album by Joel Johns
- Language: Malayalam

== Critical reception ==
Newindianexpress.com remarked that "Short movie 'Ente Hridayathinte Vadakku Kizhakke Attathu' goes viral."
