= Exorcist Vengeance =

2022 horror film

- Promotional release poster
- Directed by: Scott Jeffrey; Rebecca Matthews
- Written by: Matthew B.C.; Jeff Miller
- Produced by: Scott Jeffrey; Rebecca Matthews; Jeff Miller
- Starring: Robert Bronzi; Sarah Alexandra Marks; Steven Berkoff
- Music by: Mike Ellaway
- Production companies: Millman Productions; Proportion Productions; Titan Global Entertainment
- Distributed by: Uncork'd Entertainment
- Release date: February 8, 2022
- Language: English

Exorcist Vengeance is a 2022 supernatural horror film directed and produced by Scott Jeffrey and Rebecca Matthews. It stars "Charles Bronson lookalike" Robert Bronzi, alongside Steven Berkoff, Sarah Alexandra Marks, Nicola Wright, Simon Furness, Nicole Nabi, Anna Liddell, and Ben Parsons. Mark L. Lester served as executive producer on the film.

Exorcist Vengeance was released on DVD and video-on-demand (VOD) on February 8, 2022, by Uncork'd Entertainment.

== Cast ==
- Robert Bronzi as Father Jozsef
- Steven Berkoff as Bishop Canelo
- Sarah Alexandra Marks as Rebecca
- Nicola Wright as Christine
- Simon Furness as Patrick
- Nicole Nabi
- Anna Liddell
- Ben Parsons as Nick

== Reception ==
On Rotten Tomatoes, the film has an approval rating of 0% based on five reviews.

Andrew Stover of Film Threat gave the film a score of 5 out of 10, writing that its "uneven tone and underdeveloped suspense prevent the supernatural horror mystery from reaching success" although did praise the score for "sustaining some much-needed suspense" while there is a "unique family dynamic" in the acting. Kelly Vance, writing for the East Bay Express, called the film "insultingly stupid", and unfavorably compared Bronzi's performance to that of "Tommy Wiseau, star of the midnight-movie favorite The Room."
