= Eraser Wars =

- Directed by: Akira
- Release date: March 2, 2017
- Running time: 10 minutes
- Country: Japan
- Language: Japanese

Eraser Wars is a 2017 Japanese animated science fiction action film. Its director, AKIRA, was in 7th grade at the point of completion and release of the film. All characters are portrayed using rubber erasers. The film was digitally released in Japan, the United States, and the European Union on Amazon Prime in 2018. A sequel and spin-off film, MIDNIGHT ~ Eraser WARS spin off, has also been produced starring actress Hinako Saeki and Kayo Hoshino.

== Release ==
- Busan International Kids & Youth Film Festival (2018)
- Animation Runs! (2018)
- DONATION THEATER (2018)
- Toronto International Independent Film Festival (2017)
- 21st Bucheon International Fantastic Film Festival (2017)
- Cinema New York City official selection (2017)
- KINEKO International Children's Film Festival (2017)
- Yubari International Fantastic Film Festival (2017)
- 1st Yokkaichi Film Festival (2017)
