= SA's Got Talent season 7 =

SA's Got Talent
- Season 7
- Hosted by: Mo Mahlangu
- Judges: Jamie Bartlett; Shado Twala; DJ Fresh
- Winner: Kryptonite Dance Academy

Release
- Original network: E.tv
- Original release: September 4 – November 6, 2016

Season chronology
- ← Previous; Season 6 Next → Season 8

In 2016 SA's Got Talent returned for another season. Mo Mahlangu was named the new host. DJ Fresh and Shado Twala returned to the judging panel and a new judge, Jamie Bartlett, was added to the judging panel.

== Changes ==
- A new host was introduced. The new host was South African comedian, Mo Mahlangu.
- A new judge was introduced. The new judge replacing Lalla Hirayama, was South African actor, Jamie Bartlett.
- A new producers of SABC 3's talk show, Trending SA, is 10-Speed TV Pictures.

== Auditions ==
=== Open Auditions ===
City	Audition Dates	Venue
Cape Town	30 April, 1 May 2016	Baxter Theatre
Johannesburg	7, 8 May 2016	UJ Arts Theatre
Durban	14 May 2016	Olive Convention Centre

=== Judges auditions ===
Acts who were accepted in the open auditions, make it through to the judges audition, where it is televised with a live audience. For the judges auditions, there are 5 episodes where hundreds of acts are put through to have a chance to get to the next round – the semifinals, although only 21 acts will get through.

== Semi-finals ==
There are 3 episodes in the semifinal part of this competition. Each episode consists of 7 acts. There are also 3 result episodes in which 2 acts from each episode are put through to the finals.

=== Top 21 List Summary ===
Key	Bold Winner	Finalist	Eliminated	Golden Buzzer (Auditions)

Name	Category/Act
Corli Du Toit	Yoyo Artist
Nassi	Singer
Kryptonite Dance Academy	Dancers (Group Act)
Maja Snyman	Violinist
Phoenix	Singer
Toxic Turfz	Contortionist/dancer
Derek Plaatjies	Singer/Guitarist
Manila Von Teez	Drag Artiste
Hlanganani Marimba Band	Traditional music group
Eagan Feb	Dancer (Michael Jackson Impersonator)
Gurulogic Band	Music group
Chelsea	Dancer
Presbyterian Brass Band	Brass band
Chik Aljoy	Ventriloquist
Jesse Govender	Singer/Multi-Instrumentalist
Wilson	Aerobic gymnastics
Two O'Bodix	Dancers (Group Act)
The Professionals	Dancers (Group Act)
Mawonga	Magician
Basement 8	Music group
Oleksii & Michele	Contemporary Dancers (Group Act)

=== Semi-final 1 ===
Key	Buzzed	Advanced (Viewers choice)	Advanced (Won Judges choice)	Eliminated (Lost Judges choice)	Eliminated

Result show guest: Matthew Mole

Order	Name	Act	Shado Twala	DJ Fresh	Jamie Bartlett
1	Oleksii & Michele	Contemporary Dancers (Group Act)			
2	Mawonga	Magician			
3	Maja Snyman	Violinist			
4	The Professionals	Dancers (Group Act)			
5	Phoenix	Singer			
6	Chelsea	Dancer			
7	Hlanganani Marimba Band	Traditional music group			

=== Semi-final 2 ===
Key	Buzzed	Advanced (Viewers choice)	Advanced (Won Judges choice)	Eliminated (Lost Judges choice)	Eliminated

Result show guest: Fifi Cooper

Order	Name	Act	DJ Fresh	Shado Twala	Jamie Bartlett
1	Eagan Feb	Dancer (Michael Jackson Impersonator)			
2	Derek Plaatjies	Singer/Guitarist			
3	Basement 8	Music group			
4	Two O'Bodix	Dancers (Group Act)			
5	Chik Aljoy	Ventriloquist			
6	Wilson	Aerobic gymnastics			
7	Kryptonite Dance Academy	Dancers (Group Act)			

=== Semi-final 3 ===
Key	Buzzed	Advanced (Viewers choice)	Advanced (Won Judges choice)	Eliminated (Lost Judges choice)	Eliminated

Result show guest: Aewon Wolf and Moonchild

Order	Name	Act	DJ Fresh	Shado Twala	Jamie Bartlett
1	Manila Von Teez	Drag Artiste			
2	Jesse Govender	Singer/Multi-Instrumentalist			
3	Corli Du Toit	Yoyo Artist			
4	Toxic Turfz	Contortionist/dancer			
5	Gurulogic Band	Music group			
6	Nassi	Singer			
7	Presbyterian Brass Band	Brass band			

== Final ==
Key	Buzzed	Winner	Runner-up	Third Place	Eliminated

6 acts are put through to the finals with 1 winner, ultimately, that wins the grand prize of R500 000.

Result show guest: Kwesta

Order	Name	Act	DJ Fresh	Shado Twala	Jamie Bartlett
1	Jesse Govender	Singer/Multi-Instrumentalist			
2	Manila Von Teez	Drag Artiste			
3	Phoenix	Singer			
4	Derek Plaatjies	Singer/Guitarist			
5	The Professionals	Dancers (Group Act)			
6	Kryptonite Dance Academy	Dancers (Group Act)			

== Episode summary ==
Episode	Date
Auditions	September 4, 2016
Auditions	September 11, 2016
Auditions	September 18, 2016
Auditions	September 25, 2016
Auditions	October 2, 2016
Auditions	October 9, 2016
Semi-final 1	October 16, 2016
Semi-final 1 Results	October 16, 2016
Semi-final 2	October 23, 2016
Semi-final 2 Results	October 23, 2016
Semi-final 3	October 30, 2016
Semi-final 3 Results	October 30, 2016
Final	November 6, 2016
Final Results	November 6, 2016
