= SA's Got Talent season 6 =

SA's Got Talent
- Season 6
- Hosted by: Tats Nkonzo
- Judges: Lalla Hirayama; Shado Twala; DJ Fresh
- Winner: DJ Arch JNR

Release
- Original network: E.tv
- Original release: 6 September – 8 November 2015

Season chronology
- ← Previous; Season 5 Next → Season 7

In 2015 SA's Got Talent returned for another season. Tatz remained the host. Shado, Lalla and DJ Fresh have remained the judging panel this year.

== Changes ==
- From this season a golden buzzer was added, which if pressed would send the contestant straight through to the semi-finals. Each judge can only use the buzzer once.
- The prize was changed from R250 000 to R500 000.

== Auditions ==
=== Open Auditions ===
| City | Audition Dates | Venue |
|---|---|---|
| Durban | 16 May 2015 | Olive Convention Centre |
| Johannesburg | 23, 24 May 2015 | Focus Rooms |
| Cape Town | 30, 31 May | Belmont Square |

=== Judges Auditions ===
Acts who were accepted in the open auditions, make it through to the judges audition, where it is televised with a live audience. For the judges auditions, there are 5 episodes where hundreds of acts are put through to have a chance to get to the next round - the semi-finals, although only 21 acts will get through.

== Semi-finals ==
There are 3 episodes in the semi-finals part of this competition. Each episode consists of 7 acts. There are also 3 result episodes in which 2 acts from each episode are put through to the finals.

=== Top 21 List Summary ===
| Key | Bold Winner | Finalist | Eliminated | Golden Buzzer (Auditions) |

| Name | Category/Act |
|---|---|
| Genevieve | Singer |
| Cordiël | Singer |
| Amanda | Singer |
| K-N9ne | Singer (Rapper) |
| Henno William | Singer/ Pianist |
| Grace de la Hunt | Singer/ Guitarist |
| Will Rayz | Singer/ Guitarist |
| Isabella Jane | Singer/ ventriloquist |
| Joe and the Ganga Muffins | Singer/ Band (Group act) |
| Gudfellaz | Singers (Acappella)(Group Act) |
| Confidential | Singer/ Band (Group act) |
| Street Stylers | Dancers (Group act) |
| Hizi-Hizi | Dancers (Group act) |
| Mike and Jamal | Dancers (Group act) |
| Tapcussionists | Dancers/ Band (Group act) |
| DJ Arch JNR | Variety Act (DJ) |
| Mum-Z | Variety Act (Comedian) |
| Wian the Magician | Variety Act (Magician) |
| Team Gravity Core | Variety Act (Acrobats)(Group act) |
| Double Blacks | Variety Act (Comedians)(Group act) |
| Paint Addiction | Variety Act (Speed painters)(Group act) |

=== Semi-final 1 ===
| Key | Buzzed | Advanced (Viewers choice) | Advanced (Won Judges choice) | Eliminated (Lost Judges choice) | Eliminated |

Result show guest: Tholwana Mohale

| Order | Name | Act | DJ Fresh | Shado Twala | Lalla Hirayama |
|---|---|---|---|---|---|
| 1 | Henno William | Singer/ Pianist | | | |
| 2 | Mum-Z | Variety Act (Comedian) | | | |
| 3 | Joe and the Ganga Muffins | Singer/ Band (Group act) | | | |
| 4 | Cordiël | Singer | | | |
| 5 | Paint Addiction | Variety Act (Speed painters) (Group act) | | | |
| 6 | Amanda | Singer | | | |
| 7 | Street Stylers | Dancers (Group act) | | | |

=== Semi-final 2 ===
| Key | Buzzed | Advanced (Viewers choice) | Advanced (Won Judges choice) | Eliminated (Lost Judges choice) | Eliminated |

Result show guest: Micasa

| Order | Name | Act | DJ Fresh | Shado Twala | Lalla Hirayama |
|---|---|---|---|---|---|
| 1 | Team Gravity Core | Variety Act (Acrobats)(Group act) | | | |
| 2 | Isabella Jane | Singer/ ventriloquist | | | |
| 3 | Will Rayz | Singer/ Guitarist | | | |
| 4 | Wian the Magician | Variety Act (Magician) | | | |
| 5 | Confidential | Singer/ Band (Group act) | | | |
| 6 | Genevieve | Singer | | | |
| 7 | Mike and Jamal | Dancers (Group act) | | | |

=== Semi-final 3 ===
| Key | Buzzed | Advanced (Viewers choice) | Advanced (Won Judges choice) | Eliminated (Lost Judges choice) | Eliminated |

Result show guest: Tresor

| Order | Name | Act | DJ Fresh | Shado Twala | Lalla Hirayama |
|---|---|---|---|---|---|
| 1 | Tapcussionists | Dancers/ Band (Group act) | | | |
| 2 | K-N9ne | Singer (Rapper) | | | |
| 3 | Double Blacks | Variety Act (Comedians)(Group act) | | | |
| 4 | Grace de la Hunt | Singer/ Guitarist | | | |
| 5 | DJ Arch JNR | Variety Act (DJ) | | | |
| 6 | Gudfellaz | Singers (Acappella)(Group Act) | | | |
| 7 | Hizi-Hizi | Dancers (Group act) | | | |

== Final ==
| Key | Buzzed | Winner | Runner-up | Third Place | Eliminated |

6 acts are put through to the finals with 1 winner, ultimately, that wins the grand prize of R500 000.

Result show guest: Toya Delazy

| Order | Name | Act | DJ Fresh | Shado Twala | Lalla Hirayama |
|---|---|---|---|---|---|
| 1 | Street Stylers | Dancers (Group act) | | | |
| 2 | Isabella Jane | Singer/ ventriloquist | | | |
| 3 | Henno William | Singer/ Pianist | | | |
| 4 | DJ Arch JNR | Variety Act (DJ) | | | |
| 5 | K-N9ne | Singer (Rapper) | | | |
| 6 | Will Rayz | Singer/ Guitarist | | | |

== Episode summary ==
| Episode | Date |
|---|---|
| Auditions | September 6, 2015 |
| Auditions | September 13, 2015 |
| Auditions | September 20, 2015 |
| Auditions | September 27, 2015 |
| Auditions | October 4, 2015 |
| Auditions | October 11, 2015 |
| Semi-final 1 | October 18, 2015 |
| Semi-final 1 Results | October 18, 2015 |
| Semi-final 2 | October 25, 2015 |
| Semi-final 2 Results | October 25, 2015 |
| Semi-final 3 | November 1, 2015 |
| Semi-final 3 Results | November 1, 2015 |
| Final | November 8, 2015 |
| Final Results | November 8, 2015 |
