= SA's Got Talent season 5 =

SA's Got Talent
- Season 5
- Hosted by: Tats Nkonzo
- Judges: Lalla Hirayama; Shado Twala; DJ Fresh
- Winner: Tholwana Mohale

Release
- Original network: E.tv
- Original release: September 7 – November 9, 2014

Season chronology
- ← Previous; Season 4 Next → Season 6

In 2014 SA's Got Talent returned for another season. The season started on 7 September. Tatz remained the host. It has been announced that Shado is also staying, but Ian and Kabelo will leave. Lalla Hirayama and DJ Fresh are joined the judging panel this year.

== Auditions ==
=== Open Auditions ===
City	Audition Dates	Venue
Durban	24 May 2014	Olive Convention Centre
Cape Town	31 May- 1 June 2014	Belmont Square
Johannesburg	7–8 June 2014	Focus Rooms

=== Judges Auditions ===
Acts who were accepted in the open auditions, make it through to the judges audition, where it is televised with a live audience. For the judges auditions, there is 1 episode per city where hundreds of acts are put through to have a chance to get to the next round - the semi-finals, although only 18 acts will get through.

Episode #	City	Audition Date	Venue
1	Cape Town	26-7-2014	Baxter Theatre
2	Cape Town	27-7-2014	Baxter Theatre
3	Johannesburg	2-8-2014	UJ Arts Theatre
4	Johannesburg	3-8-2014	UJ Arts Theatre

== Semi-finals ==
There are 3 episodes in the semi-finals part of this competition. Each episode consists of 6 acts. There are also 3 result episodes in which 2 acts from each episode are put through to the finals.

=== Top 18 List Summary ===
Key	Bold Winner	Finalist	Eliminated

Name	Category/Act
Air Force	Singers (a cappella) (group act)
Arise	Dancers (children group act)
Black Lace	Singers (a cappella) (group act)
Choppa Boys	Dancers (gumboot) (group act)
Franklin Fredericks	Other act category(balancing act)
Freeze Frame	Dancers (group act)
Honey	Singers (group act)
Joe Fredericks	Singer
Jude Harpstar	Other act category(harpist)
Lew Tasker	Other act category (contact juggler)
Matrix Avators	Dancers (group act)
New Creation and The Band	Singer/ Band (group act)
Noelle	Singer (opera)
Phelelani and Jacobus	Other act category (circus performers)
Tessa Hijner	Singer
Tholwana Mohale	Singer/ guitarist
The Young Weezy Boys	Dancers (group act)
Zakiyah Brown	Singer

=== Semi-final 1 ===
Key	Buzzed	Advanced (Viewers choice)	Advanced (Won Judges choice)	Eliminated (Lost Judges choice)	Eliminated

Result show guest: Johnny Apple

Order	Name	Act	DJ Fresh	Shado Twala	Lalla Hirayama
1	Phelelani and Jacobus	Other act category (circus performers)			
2	Zakiyah Brown	Singer			
3	The Young Weezy Boys	Dancers (group act)			
4	Air Force	Singers (a cappella) (group act)			
5	Choppa Boys	Dancers (gumboot) (group act)			
6	Joe Fredericks	Singer			

=== Semi-final 2 ===
Key	Buzzed	Advanced (Viewers choice)	Advanced (Won Judges choice)	Eliminated (Lost Judges choice)	Eliminated

Result show guest: Cassper Nyovest

Order	Name	Act	DJ Fresh	Shado Twala	Lalla Hirayama
1	Freeze Frame	Dancers (group act)			
2	Noelle	Singer (opera)			
3	Franklin Fredericks	Other act category(balancing act)			
4	Lew Tasker	Other act category (contact juggler)			
5	Tessa Hijner	Singer			
6	New Creation and The Band	Singer/ Band (group act)			

=== Semi-final 3 ===
Key	Buzzed	Advanced (Viewers choice)	Advanced (Won Judges choice)	Eliminated (Lost Judges choice)	Eliminated

Result show guest: Harrison Crump

Order	Name	Act	DJ Fresh	Shado Twala	Lalla Hirayama
1	Black Lace	Singers (a cappella) (group act)			
2	Tholwana Mohale	Singer/ guitarist			
3	Arise	Dancers (children group act)			
4	Honey	Singers (group act)			
5	Jude Harpstar	Other act category(harpist)			
6	Matrix Avators	Dancers (group act)			

== Final ==
Key	Buzzed	Winner	Runner-up	Third Place	Eliminated

6 acts are put through to the finals with 1 winner, ultimately, that wins the grand prize of R250 000.

Result show guest: AKA

Order	Name	Act	DJ Fresh	Shado Twala	Lalla Hirayama
1	New Creation and The Band	Singer/ Band (group act)			
2	Honey	Singers (group act)			
3	The Young Weezy Boys	Dancers (group act)			
4	Tholwana Mohale	Singer/ guitarist			
5	Joe Fredericks	Singer			
6	Freeze Frame	Dancers (group act)			

== Episode summary ==
Episode	Date
Auditions	7 September 2014
Auditions	14 September 2014
Auditions	21 September 2014
Auditions	28 September 2014
Auditions	October 5, 2014
Auditions	October 12, 2014
Semi-final 1	October 19, 2014
Semi-final 1 Results	October 20, 2014
Semi-final 2	October 26, 2014
Semi-final 2 Results	October 27, 2014
Semi final-3	November 2, 2014
Semi-final 3 Results	November 3, 2014
Final	November 9, 2014
Final Results	November 9, 2014
