= SA's Got Talent =

South African television show

- Genre: Interactive reality television talent show
- Created by: Simon Cowell
- Presented by: Anele Ndoda; Rob van Vuuren; Tats Nkonzo; Mongezi “Mo” Mahlangu
- Judges: Jamie Bartlett; Shado Twala; DJ Fresh
- Country of origin: South Africa
- Original language: English
- No. of series: 8

Production
- Running time: 60 minutes (inc. comms)
- Production company: Rapid Blue (Season 1 - 8)

Original release
- Network: SABC 2 (Season 1 and 2) e.tv (Season 3 - 8)
- Release: 1 October 2009 – 12 November 2017

SA's Got Talent (also known as South Africa's Got Talent or shorten to SAGT) is a South African television show that aired on e.tv and part of the Got Talent series. It was presented by Mo Mahlangu, popularly known as Tol Ass Mo. Singers, dancers, comedians, variety acts, and other performers competed against each other for audience support. The winner of each series received R500,000 (R250,000 in Seasons 1 to 5). The first series of the talent show began on 1 October 2009 and was broadcast weekly with a live semi-finals and final on 12 November 2009.

== Format ==
The auditions take place in front of the judges and a live audience at a different city across South Africa. At any time during the audition the judges may show disapproval to the act by pressing a buzzer which lights that lights a red X near them. If all the judges press their buzzers, the act ends immediately. To advance to the second round, auditionees needed to get at least two yes votes or they would be sent home.

After the auditions the judges have to whittle almost 200 successful acts down to just 21. All of the performers are called back to discover if they have progressed to the semi-finals.

The remaining acts perform across a number of live semi-finals, with the two most popular acts from each semi-finals winning a position in the final. Unlike the American version, judges may still end a performance early with three Xs in the finals, as with the American version, the judges cannot buzz an act after the semi-finals. The judges are again asked to express their views on each act's performance.

After all acts have performed, phone lines open for a short time. After the votes have been counted, the act that has polled the highest number of public votes is automatically placed in the final. The judges then choose between the second and third most popular acts, with the winner of that vote also gaining a place in the final. All other acts are then eliminated from the competition.

From Season 6, the golden buzzer was added, which if pressed would send the contestant straight to the semi-finals but it can only be press once so when press the judges can't hit again and if it they don't need to vote yes or no. The first contestant to get the gold buzzer was Henno William when he sang the song 'Let it be' in the 3rd episode of season 6.

== Series overview ==
Season	Premiere	Finale	Winner	Judges			Hosts	Prize amount
Season	Premiere	Finale	Winner	Judge 1	Judge 2	Judge 3	Hosts	Prize amount
1	1 October 2009	12 November 2009	Darren Rajbal	Randall Abrahams	Shado Twala	Ian Von Memerty	Rob van Vuuren; Anele Mdoda	R250,000
2	16 September 2010	28 October 2010	James Bhemgee	Randall Abrahams	Shado Twala	Ian Von Memerty	Rob van Vuuren; Anele Mdoda	R250,000
3	30 August 2012	18 October 2012	Botlhale Boikanyo	Kabelo Mabalane	Shado Twala	Ian Von Memerty	Tats Nkonzo	R250,000
4	29 August 2013	17 October 2013	Johnny Apple	Kabelo Mabalane	Shado Twala	Ian Von Memerty	Tats Nkonzo	R250,000
5	7 September 2014	9 November 2014	Tholwana Mohale	Lalla Hirayama	Shado Twala	DJ Fresh	Tats Nkonzo	R250,000
6	9 September 2015	8 November 2015	DJ Arch JNR	Lalla Hirayama	Shado Twala	DJ Fresh	Tats Nkonzo	R500,000
7	4 September 2016	6 November 2016	Kryptonite Dance Academy	Jamie Bartlett	Shado Twala	DJ Fresh	Mo Mahlangu	R500,000
8	10 September 2017	12 November 2017	AnecNote	Jamie Bartlett	Shado Twala	DJ Fresh	Mo Mahlangu	R500,000
