= SA's Got Talent season 4 =

SA's Got Talent
- Season 4
- Hosted by: Tats Nkonzo
- Judges: Kabelo Mabalane; Shado Twala; Ian von Memerty
- Winner: Johnny Apple

Release
- Original network: E.tv
- Original release: August 29 – October 17, 2013

Season chronology
- Next → Season 5

SA's Got Talent was renewed for a fourth season. There were no major changes this season.

== Auditions ==
City	Date	Venue
Durban	18 May 2013	Olive Convention Centre
Johannesburg	26–27 May 2013	Focus Rooms
Cape Town	1–2 June 2013	River Club

== Semifinals ==
Color key:

Winner | Runner-up | Third place | Semi-finalist

Participant	Genre	Act	Semi-final	Finished
Cindy-Ann Abrahams	Singing	Singer	3	Eliminated
Divyog & Keeran	Music	Bongo Drummer & Keyboardist	1	Eliminated
Ezio Miller	Dance	Dancer	1	Eliminated
Gerrard Quevauvilliers	Comedy	Ventriloquist	2	Eliminated
Johnny Apple	Singing	Singer	2	Winner
Justinleigh Band	Music	Band	1	Third place
K.D.S.	Dance	Dance Group	3	Eliminated
Lil Diezo	Singing	Rapper	2	Runner-Up
Luzuko Mamba	Dance	Dancer	3	Finalist
Lyrical Swagg	Singing	Rapping Duo	1	Eliminated
Nadia Van Der Westhuizen	Singing	Singer	3	Finalist
Palessa Molhamme	Acrobatics	Contortionist	3	Eliminated
Siyabonga	Variety	Juggler	2	Eliminated
The Glamipulator	Magic	Magician	1	Finalist
Trevor Shroonraad	Acrobatics	Pole Dancer	1	Eliminated
Tronix	Dance	LED Dance Group	2	Eliminated
U.C.K.	Dance	Dance Duo	2	Eliminated
Yello	Acrobatics/Comedy	Comedy Aerialist	3	Eliminated

=== Semi-finals summary ===
Buzzer | Judges' vote | Won the Public's Vote | Won the Judges' Vote
Lost Judges' Vote | Eliminated

Prior to the beginning of the live shows, the semi-finalists were decided following a deliberation stage.

==== Semi-final 1 ====
Guest performance: The Muffins

Semi-Finalist	Order	Buzzes and judges' votes			Finished
Semi-Finalist	Order	Von Memerty	Twala	Mabalane	Finished
Trevor Shroonraad	1				5th -Eliminated
Justinleigh Band	2				Advanced (Won Public Vote)
Lyrical Swagg	3				6th - Eliminated
Divyog & Keeran	4				Eliminated (Lost Judge Vote)
Ezio Miller	5				4th -Eliminated
The Glamipulator	6				Advanced (Won Judge Vote)

==== Semi-final 2 ====
Guest performance: Gang of Instrumentals

Semi-Finalist	Order	Buzzes and judges' votes			Finished
Semi-Finalist	Order	Von Memerty	Twala	Mabalane	Finished
Siyabonga	1				6th -Eliminated
U.C.K.	2				Eliminated (Lost Judge Vote)
Tronix	3				5th -Eliminated
Lil Deizo	4				Advanced (Won Judge Vote)
Gerrard Quevauvilliers	5				4th -Eliminated
Johnny Apple	6				Advanced (Won Public Vote)

==== Semi-final 3 ====
Guest performance: The Arrows

Semi-Finalist	Order	Buzzes and judges' votes			Finished
Semi-Finalist	Order	Von Memerty	Twala	Mabalane	Finished
Yello	1				6th -Eliminated
K.D.S.	2				4th -Eliminated
Palessa Mohlamme	3				5th - Eliminated
Cindy-Ann Abrahams	4				Eliminated (Lost Judge Vote)
Luzuko Mamba	5				Advanced (Won Judge Vote)
Nadia Van Der Westhuizen	6				Advanced (Won Public Vote)
