= SA's Got Talent season 8 =

SA's Got Talent
- Season 8
- Hosted by: Mo Mahlangu
- Judges: Jamie Bartlett; Shado Twala; DJ Fresh
- Winner: AnecNote

Release
- Original network: E.tv
- Original release: 10 September – 12 November 2017

Season chronology
- ← Previous; Season 7

== Auditions ==
=== Pre-Auditions ===
City	Audition Dates	Venue
Johannesburg	6, 7 May 2017	The Pyramid Conference & Venue Centre
Cape Town	13, 14 May 2017	Newlands Rugby Stadium
Durban	20 May 2017	Moses Mabhida Stadium

=== Theatre Auditions ===
Acts who were accepted in the pre-auditions, make it through to the theatre audition, where it is televised with a live audience. For the theatre auditions, there are 6 episodes where hundreds of acts are put through to have a chance to get to the next round - the semi-finals, although only 21 acts will get through.

== Top 21 Acts ==
After the theatre auditions, the judges decide which 21 acts will go through to the live shows. There are 3 semi-finals and 1 final each with its own results show. Only 2 acts from each semi-final will advance to the final.

=== Top 21 List Summary ===
Key	Bold Winner	Finalist	Golden Buzzer (Auditions)

Contestant	Location	Age	Act
Ama-Zebra	Inanda, Durban	17 - 29	Traditional Zulu Performance Group
Gabriella "Skydancer" Sissons	Noordhoek, Cape Town	38	Aerial silk
Tribal Echo	Kleinmond, Western Cape	38 - 43	Afrikaans Fusion Band
The Flame Boyz	Humansdorp, Eastern Cape	17 - 21	Hip Hop dance crew
Marianthe	Northway, Durban	16	Singer
Sibusiso Gwala	Umlazi, Durban	32	Trumpet Impersonator
Jonty Stander	Randburg, Johannesburg	21	Lyrical Street Dancer
Captain P	Turffontein, Johannesburg	25	Unicyclist and juggler
Just 6	Edenvale, Johannesburg	21 - 29	Acapella group
Seth	Crawford, Cape Town	20	Beat boxer
Art Of Dance	Ennerdale, Johannesburg	9 - 23	Lyrical dance crew
Actionarte	Observatory, Cape Town	26	Hair Suspension
Ethan & Ciara	Bonteheuwel, Cape Town	10	Latin dancers
S'hlangene Dancers	Sebokeng, Vereeniging	16 - 24	Theatrical dance crew
Fazlyn	Southgate, Durban	13	Pop singer
Anasia	Durban Central, Durban	42	Comedic parody
AnecNote	Bergvliet, Cape Town	25 - 31	Acapella group
Nan Hau Dancers	Bronkhorspruit, Johannesburg	18 - 24	Chinese Performance Art Group
Miss V	Brits, North West	33	Singer
Sipho Six	Boipatong, Gauteng	25	Freestyle Footballer
Siphokazi	Daveyton, Johannesburg	23	Opera singer

== Semi-finals ==
=== Semi-final 1 (22 October) ===
Key	Buzzed	Advanced (Viewers choice)	Advanced (Won Judges choice)	Eliminated (Lost Judges choice)	Eliminated

Result show guest: Bhizer & Busiswa

Order	Contestant	Act	Age	DJ Fresh	Shado Twala	Jamie Bartlett
1	Ethan and Ciara	Latin Dancers	10			
2	Siphokazi	Opera Singer	23			
3	Tribal Echo	Afrikaans Band	33 – 43			
4	Jonty Stander	Lyrical Street Dancer	21			
5	Gabriela “Skydancer” Sissons	Aerial Silk Artist	38			
6	Sibusiso Gwala	Trumpet Impersonator	32			
7	Ama-Zebra	Traditional Zulu Performance Group	15 – 29			

=== Semi-final 2 (29 October) ===
Key	Buzzed	Advanced (Viewers choice)	Advanced (Won Judges choice)	Eliminated (Lost Judges choice)	Eliminated

Result show guest: Amanda Black

Order	Contestant	Act	Age	DJ Fresh	Shado Twala	Jamie Bartlett
1	Captain P	Unicycling juggler	25			
2	The Flame Boyz	Hip Hop Dance Group	17 – 21			
3	Actionarte	Hair Suspension	26			
4	Seth	Beat Boxer	20			
5	Nan Hua Dancers	Chinese Performance Art Group	18 – 24			
6	Fazlyn	Singer	12			
7	Just 6	Acapella group	21 – 29			

=== Semi-final 3 (5 November) ===
Key	Buzzed	Advanced (Viewers choice)	Advanced (Won Judges choice)	Eliminated (Lost Judges choice)	Eliminated

Result show guest: Just Robyn

Order	Contestant	Act	Age	DJ Fresh	Shado Twala	Jamie Bartlett
1	Sipho Six	Freestyle Footballer	25			
2	Marianthe	Singer	16			
3	Miss V	Singer	33			
4	S’hlangene Dancers	Theatrical Performance	16 – 25			
5	AnecNote	Acapella Group	25 – 31			
6	Anasia	Comedic parody	42			
7	Art Of Dance	Lyrical Dancers	9 – 23			

== Final ==
=== Final (12 November) ===
Key	Buzzed	Winner	Runner-up	Third Place	Eliminated

6 acts are put through to the finals with 1 winner, ultimately, that wins the grand prize of R500 000.

Result show guest: Sketchy Bongo & Kaien Cruz

Order	Contestant	Act	Age	DJ Fresh	Shado Twala	Jamie Bartlett
1	Just 6	Acapella Group	21 – 29			
2	Art Of Dance	Lyrical Dancing Group	9 – 23			
3	Siphokazi	Opera Singer	23			
4	Nan Hua Dancers	Chinese Performance Art Group	18 – 24			
5	AnecNote	Acapella Group	25 – 31			
6	Ama-Zebra	Traditional Zulu Performance Group	15 – 29			
