= The All New Adventures of Laurel & Hardy in For Love or Mummy =

- Directed by: Larry Harmon; John Cherry
- Screenplay by: Jeffrey Pillars; Joseph Dattorre
- Produced by: Larry Harmon; Susan Harmon; Kenneth M. Badish; John Cherry
- Starring: Bronson Pinchot; Gailard Sartain; F. Murray Abraham
- Cinematography: James Robb
- Edited by: Craig Bassett; Virgilio Da Silva
- Music by: Robert Folk
- Production companies: Coast Entertainment; White Dune Entertainment Pty Ltd; Larry Harmon Production
- Distributed by: Monarch Home Video
- Release date: August 27, 1999
- Running time: 85 minutes
- Country: United States
- Language: English

The All New Adventures of Laurel & Hardy in "For Love or Mummy" is a 1999 American comedy film directed by Larry Harmon and John Cherry, based on the film shorts of Laurel & Hardy. It stars Bronson Pinchot and Gailard Sartain as Stan Laurel and Oliver Hardy.

This was the first of only two non-Ernest P. Worrell films that Cherry (primarily an advertising executive) directed in his lifetime, the other being Pirates of the Plain. Harmon earned writing and directing credits through the ownership of the Laurel and Hardy trademarks, which he had purchased in the 1960s. Another Harmon-owned character, Bozo the Clown, is mentioned in the film.

== Premise ==
Laurel and Hardy are in Florida where they meet archeologist Henry Covington, whose daughter they try to protect from the wrath of a mummy.

== Cast ==
- Bronson Pinchot as Laurel
- Gailard Sartain as Hardy
- Philip Godawa as Farouk
- Susan Danford as Leslie
- F. Murray Abraham as Professor Covington
- Rick Rogers as Kowalski
- Farouk Valley Omar as Habib
- Larry Harmon as Bozoworld Owner
- Christine Weir as Ms. Burkum
- Zane Meas as High Priest
- Gordon van Rooyen as Party Man 1
- Mathew Haldenby as Mummy
- Jeff Pillars as Biker
- Jonathan Pienaar as Young Professor
- Shannon Bowie as Young Leslie
- Lara Bye as Mrs. Covington
- Josh Cherry as Officer Levin
- Jeff Shapiro as Desk Cop
- Peter Spyropoulos as Maitre D
- Anton Stoltz as Chef Marino
- Timo Chaplin as Kid on Skateboard

== Production ==
In January 1996, it was initially announced Larry Harmon and John Cherry would be reviving the likenesses of Laurel and Hardy for a new $20 million project, initially announced under the title Jungle Bungle with Rowan Atkinson to play Laurel and Dan Aykroyd, John Goodman or Chris Farley to play Hardy. Harmon claimed that he had wanted to make a Laurel and Hardy movie for 36 years but promised Stan Laurel he'd only do so if he could find the right team and claimed to have turned down substantial offers from major studios over the years. In March 1998, the film was announced to have begun production under the new title of For Love or Mummy with Bronson Pinchot and Gailard Sartain as the nephews of Laurel and Hardy respectively.

Harmon had acquired the name and likeness rights of Laurel and Hardy in 1961 from Laurel, who had retired from acting since the death of his comedic partner Oliver Hardy in 1957. Laurel gave his blessing to Harmon for usage of the duo's likenesses with the assurance that profits generated from Harmon's ventures would be paid to his and Hardy's wives. Harmon previously starred in and co-produced the Laurel and Hardy animated series with Hanna-Barbera. Jim Varney had initially been set to play the Laurel role, but left the film due to his declining health and was replaced with Pinchot. The film was shot in Cape Town, South Africa from February through April 1998.

== Release ==
The All New Adventures of Laurel & Hardy in For Love or Mummy was released direct-to-video on August 27, 1999 by Monarch Home Video.

== Cancelled follow-ups ==
Upon first being announced, the film had been intended to be the first in a series of Laurel and Hardy films with the intention of releasing a new Laurel and Hardy film every two years. However, due to critical and commercial failure no further follow-ups were produced. Despite the film's failure, Larry Harmon expressed his intentions of subsequent Laurel and Hardy projects including a TV Special for the duo's 75th Anniversary, an interactive touring exhibit, and new Laurel and Hardy cartoons but none of these ultimately came to be.
