= Ernest Goes to Africa =

1997 film by John Cherry

- DVD Cover
- Directed by: John Cherry
- Written by: John Cherry
- Produced by: John Cherry; Kenneth M. Badish
- Starring: Jim Varney; Linda Kash; Jamie Bartlett
- Cinematography: James Robb
- Edited by: Craig Bassett
- Music by: Neill L. Solomon
- Production company: Emshell Producers
- Distributed by: Monarch Home Video; Active Entertainment
- Release date: July 27, 1997
- Running time: 90 minutes
- Country: United States
- Language: English

Ernest Goes to Africa is a 1997 American comedy film written and directed by John Cherry. It stars Jim Varney, Linda Kash and Jamie Bartlett. It is the ninth film to feature the character Ernest P. Worrell, and the eighth film in the Ernest series, after Slam Dunk Ernest (1995). In the film, Ernest unknowingly comes into the possession of stolen jewels and is kidnapped and brought to Africa where he must rescue the woman he loves.

It was released on direct-to-video on July 27, 1997. The next and final film in the series, Ernest in the Army, was released in February 1998.

== Plot ==
While attempting to fix a woman's car at a local garage, Ernest P. Worrell accidentally causes the car to get crushed, which results in his termination. He goes to a local restaurant and asks his crush, Rene Loomis, to go on a date with him. He is turned down by her because she wants to date somebody more adventurous. Ernest decides to buy her a gift to show that he really cares for her. He goes to a flea market where he buys two jewels, unaware that they are the "Eyes of Egoli" stolen from the Sinkatutu tribe in Africa by a runaway man named Mr. Rabhas who is being chased by two henchmen of Prince Kazim. He is cornered by the men but rescued by a man named Thompson and his strong African bodyguard, Bazu.

Threatening to kill him if he does not tell so he can steal them himself, Rabhas reveals where he stashed the Eyes of Igoli. Thompson walks away and Bazu takes a bag of deadly snakes and dumps it on Rabhas, leaving him to die. Meanwhile, Ernest creates a yo-yo made of the Eyes of Igoli. He does his around-the-world and crashes his fish's tank. He puts him in the sink but he flows down the drain. In trying to rescue him, he turns on the light switch to see down the drain, not realizing it was actually the garbage disposal switch. He briefly mourns. Meanwhile, Thompson eventually finds out that Ernest took the Eyes of Egoli. He spies on him at the restaurant where Rene works. Ernest gives Rene the yo-yo only to be called a small-town ordinary schmoe by her.

Thompson abducts Rene and Ernest comes to rescue her after a phone call. Thompson kidnaps him too when he gets there and puts them on a flight to Africa. After shutting Rene up in a country club's furnace room with Bazu, an old woman named Auntie Nelda comes in and explains to Bazu about how her husband died. She then throws ashes in his face and rescues Rene, knowing that it is Ernest. They escape in a golf cart and encounter many obstacles, from getting simple firewood to Ernest disguising as a girl and getting kissed by the prince to striking down the bad guys with ostrich eggs. Meanwhile, Thompson and Bazu look for Ernest and Rene. They walk down the river and encounter the cannibal Sinkatutu tribe who wants to eat them for lunch.

Ernest empties his pockets when they tell him to and plays the yo-yo one last time impressing the tribe, especially the Sinkatutu chief. He does tricks which easily turns the tribe to like them. Just as soon as the Chief is about to give him a "booster surgery", Thompson comes along by himself. He had kicked Bazu out. He suddenly blames Ernest of stealing the eyes. Thompson requests a battle of truth. Ernest has to fight Thompson in order to save Rene from becoming cooked. When Ernest hears the challenge he states "On second thought, I think I might have the booster." Thompson changes into a black warrior suit and pulls out his weapons. Ernest does the same, only his are little items. Yet, he successfully fights Thompson using them. All of a sudden, Thompson punches Ernest and knocks him out. But Ernest awakens and hears Rene calling him to use his yo-yo.

Ernest puts his fighting skills and yo-yo skills together and he does an around the world which knocks Thompson out cold and breaks the yo-yo to reveal the Eyes of Egoli. The tribe rushes toward them as Rene compliments Ernest on how he is her "Knight in Shining Armor". A few weeks later, Ernest and Rene are about to go on a date. As he enters the restaurant he takes his hat off and sets it down on the front counter. Ernest even paints an ostrich egg and gives it to her as a gift. Sadly, she tells Ernest that the date is off because he is too adventurous for her. Ernest makes a speech on how he is bold and adventurous and then, in conclusion, puts on his hat heroically, forgetting he had set it on the counter and put the ostrich egg in it.

== Cast ==
- Jim Varney as Ernest P. Worrell
- Linda Kash as Rene
- Jamie Bartlett as Thompson
- Claire Marshall as Betty
- Washington Sixolo as Sinkatutu Chief
- Robert Whitehead as Prince Kazim
- Zane Meas as Jameen
- Charles Pillai as Kareem
- Sello Sebotsane as Bazoo
- Ian Yule as Old man at flea market
- John Cherry as a customer

== Release ==
Ernest Goes to Africa was released on VHS by Monarch Home Video on July 27, 1997.
