= Jamie Bartlett =

South African actor (1966–2022)

Jamie 'Yoink' Bartlett
- Born: Jamie Bartlett; 9 July 1966; Maidenhead, Berkshire, England
- Died: 23 May 2022 (aged 55); Johannesburg, South Africa
- Occupation: Actor
- Years active: 1984–2022
- Spouse: Camilla Waldman (divorced)
- Children: 1

James 'Yoink' Bartlett (9 July 1966 – 23 May 2022) was a British-born South African actor best known for his television roles in Isidingo and Rhythm City, film and theatre. His notable work is portraying David Genaro, on Rhythm City. His acting performances made earned him multiple awards, including Avanti Television Award for Best Actor Isidingo and South African Film & Television Award (SAFTA) for Best Actor Rhythm City.

== Career ==
=== Television ===
Bartlett was a well-known South African actor prior to starring in Rhythm City. He started playing his role as David Genaro in 2007. He was the first person to speak in scene 1 on the TV series Isidingo as character Mike O'Riley when it was aired on South African television. On the set of Isidingo, he acted opposite Hlomla Dandala who portrayed Derek Nyathi.

In 1997, Bartlett acted in the action M-Net TV movie The Sexy Girls. The gang-movie genre showcased the realities of the gangster life in Cape Town.

Bartlett also guest starred in the Canadian-South African TV series Jozi-H, a hospital drama set in Johannesburg. He was also a judge on SA's Got Talent alongside Shado Twala and DJ Fresh.

=== Film ===
Bartlett's movie career began with American movies, 1987 action sequel film American Ninja 2 and subsequently the 1993 American Ninja 5 where he acted alongside Michael Dudikoff and Steve James.

Bartlett also had a supporting role playing Joss in the 2003 romantic drama Beyond Borders, an epic tale of turbulent romance between two star-crossed lovers, with Angelina Jolie.

In the 2004 British film drama Red Dust, Bartlett acted in a supporting role of Dirk Hendricks, a local policeman, opposite Hilary Swank where Academy Award winning director Tom Hooper directed the film. The film, based on the novel Red Dust by Gillian Slovo sees a New York lawyer Sarah Barcant (Hilary Swank) return to the place where she grew up, South Africa. Barcant returns to fight the case of Alex Mpondo (Chiwetel Ejiofor), a black politician who was tortured during the apartheid regime. The truth of the killing of Mpondo's comrade Steve Sizela by Piet Muller (Ian Roberts) is confirmed by Dirk Hendricks (Bartlett).

The 2007 horror thriller Prey, saw Bartlett playing a supporting role as Crawford, a professional hunter and guide. A film where an American family whilst on holiday in South Africa get lost while on a game reserve and are stalked by lions. Crawford's services are enlisted in an attempt to track the lost family, who ventured into the park on a game drive but were surrounded by lions.

Bartlett starred in the 2010 children's parable White Lion, alongside fellow South African Best Actor Tony Award Winner John Kani and Thabo Malema. The film won the SAFTA Awards for Best Cinematography in a feature film, Best Music Composition in a feature film and Best Sound Design in a feature film. Filmed on location at the Kingdom of the White Lion, SA Lion Park, Nash's Farm, Glen Afric and Entabeni Game Reserve, Bartlett played a professional hunter.

Bartlett starred in the movie, Mandela: Long Walk to Freedom based on the 1994 book Long Walk to Freedom, written by Nelson Mandela, the former president of South Africa. In the film, Bartlett played the supporting role of Sergeant James Gregory.

=== Theatre ===
Most of Bartlett's theatre work took place at the Market Theatre where he had strong ties during the Apartheid era. The theatre was founded by Mannie Manim and Barney Simon in 1976. It was known internationally as South Africa's "Theatre of the Struggle" and challenged the apartheid regime. Cock and Bull Story marked the beginning of Bartlett's professional career in 1986 where he played the role of a gay boxer and won a Vita Award for Most Promising Actor.

A year later, Bartlett starred in the satire play East in 1987 and won the Vita Best Actor Award. In 1990, he starred in Rainshark, directed by Neil McCarthy, at the Market Theatre.

Neil McCarthy directed Bartlett in Mojo in 1997 also at the Market Theatre where he won the Vita Best Actor Award. The Great Outdoors starring Bartlett premiered at the Grahamstown Arts Festival in July 2000, where he played the leading role. He had a lead role in the theatre production of The Fire Raisers which toured Switzerland.

In 2011, Bartlett returned to the Market Theater for Death of a Colonialist, where he played the lead role of an eccentric 60-something history teacher, Harold Smith from award-winning playwright Greg Latter's play. Bartlett won the 2010 Naledi Theatre Award for Best Performance by an actor in a Lead Role. The play received positive reviews for its script and acting.

== Personal life ==
Bartlett was born in England to a British father and a South African mother. He was formerly married to actress Camilla Waldman, known for her role in the Generations soap opera. The couple had a son, Hector Bartlett, and later divorced.

== Death ==
Jamie 'Yoink' Bartlett died suddenly on 23 May 2022, at the age of 55. After an autopsy was performed, it was concluded that Bartlett died from cardiac arrest.

== Filmography ==
=== Film ===
Year	Title	Role	Notes/Director
1987	American Ninja 2: The Confrontation	Support	dir. Sam Firstenberg
1990	‘’The Sandgrass People	Lead	Dir. Koos Roets
1991	Sweet 'n Short	Spookie Simpson	dir. Gray Hofmeyr Leon Schuster
1993	American Ninja V	Support	dir. Cedric Sunstroom - Cannon Films
1993	A Private Life	Support - Dickie	dir. Francis Gerard
1997	Ernest Goes to Africa	Lead - Mr. Thompson	dir. John R. Cherry III
1999	Bravo Two Zero	Lead - Vince	dir. Tom Clegg
2003	Beyond Borders	Support - Josh	dir. Martin Campbell for Paramount films
2004	Red Dust	Support	dir. Tom Hooper
2006	12 Days of Terror	Support - Schleisser	Fox TV and Discovery Channel
2006	Avenger	Lead	dir. Robert Markowitz
2007	Prey	Lead	dir. Darrell Roodt
2010	White Lion	Lead	dir. Michael Swan
2013	Nothing for Mahala	Lead - Mike	dir. Rolie Nikiwe
2013	Mandela: Long Walk to Freedom	Support - Sgt. James Gregory	dir. Justin Chadwick

=== Theatre ===
Year	Title	Role	Director	Notes
	The Fire Raises	Lead		Toured Switzerland (Geneva & Bern)
	The Great Outdoors	Lead		Grahamstown National Arts Festival
	East	Lead	dir. Barney Simon	Fleur Du Cap Theatre Award for Best Actor
	Mojo	Lead	dir. Neil McCarthy	Vita Award for Best Actor
	Cock and Bull Story	Lead		Vita Theatre Award for Best Up & Coming Actor; National Tour
	Death of a Colonialist	Lead	dir. Craig Freimond	

=== Television ===
Year	Title	Role	Director	Notes
2007 – 2020	Rhythm City	Lead - David Genaro	dir. Harriet Gavshon	e.tv Daily Drama; Multi-Camera; South African Film & Television Award for Best Actor
	Jozi - H	Support	dir. Mfundi Vundla	Canadian TV
1999	Isidingo - Mini Series	Lead - Mike O'Riley	dir. Johnny Barbuzano	Crystal Award for Best South African Actor
1997 – 1999	Isidingo - Daily Drama	Lead - Mike O'Riley		SABC 3 Daily TV Drama; Multi-Camera; Vita Award
1997	The Sexy Girls	Lead - Milo	Russell Thompson	M-Net; Made for TV movie

== Awards ==
- The Crystal Award for Best Actor Isidingo
- Vita Award for Best Lead Actor The Great Outdoors
- Avanti Television Award for Best Actor Isidingo
- Vita Award for Best Actor Mojo
- Fleur Du Cap Theatre Award for Best Actor East
- Vita Theatre Award for Best Up & Coming Actor Cock and Bull Story
- South African Film & Television Award (SAFTA) for Best Actor Rhythm City

== Training ==
- Trained in Speech and Drama at the University of Cape Town
- Post Graduate Master classes with Peter Bridgemont at Chrysalis Theatre Acting School, London.
