= Denise Zimba =

South African actress, singer and TV personality

- Born: Kopano Denise Zimba; 10 November 1988 (age 37); North West, South Africa
- Education: Tshwane University of Technology
- Occupations: actress; singer; TV Personality; dancer
- Years active: 2010–present
- Known for: Generations: The Legacy
- Spouse: Jakob Schlichtig
- Partner: Kea Phiri
- Children: 2
- Musical career
- Genres: Rnb; Soul; Pop
- Instrument: Vocals
- Label: Zimba Entertainment (Former)
- Website: denisezimba.com

Denise Zimba (born 10 November 1988) is a South African actress, singer, dancer and presenter, most known for her role as Mary Gumede in the soap opera Generations: The Legacy. She also joined Vuzu's flagship daily entertainment show V-Entertainment in 2013.

== Filmography ==
Year	Title	Role	Note
2013	Fly Chix	Denise Zimba(Herself)	Docu-reality series
2013–2016	V-Entertainment	Denise Zimba (Herself)	Presenter
2014	Generations:The Legacy	Mary Gumede	

== Discography ==
=== Studio EP ===
- Rude
