= Who Am I? (1998 film) =

1998 Hong Kong film by Jackie Chan and Benny Chan

- Hong Kong film poster
- Directed by: Jackie Chan; Benny Chan
- Written by: Jackie Chan; Susan Chan; Lee Reynolds
- Produced by: Barbie Tung
- Starring: Jackie Chan; Michelle Ferre; Mirai Yamamoto; Ron Smerczak; Ed Nelson; Washington Sixolo
- Cinematography: Poon Hang Sang
- Edited by: Peter Cheung; Yau Chi Wai
- Music by: Nathan Wang
- Distributed by: Golden Harvest
- Release date: 17 January 1998
- Running time: 103 minutes
- Country: Hong Kong
- Language: English
- Box office: US$19 million (est.)

Who Am I? (traditional Chinese: 我是誰; simplified Chinese: 我是谁, also known as Jackie Chan's Who Am I?) is a 1998 English-language Hong Kong spy action comedy film directed by Benny Chan and Jackie Chan, who also starred in the leading role, and writer with Susan Chan and Lee Reynolds. The film was released theatrically in Hong Kong on 17 January 1998. It is also Chan's second film to be scripted and shot in English, the first one being Mr. Nice Guy.

== Plot ==
Somewhere in the jungles of South Africa on Thanksgiving 1996, a multinational military unit named Special Force Unit ambushes a convoy and kidnaps several scientists working on a highly-volatile compound extracted from a recently discovered meteorite. Among the operatives is a Hong Kong national identified as "Jackie Chan". The CIA assigns Agent Morgan to investigate the incident, unaware that he and newly retired General Sherman orchestrated the abduction for their personal profit. At the same time, the CIA assigns another operative in South Africa for a more covert operation.

Jackie wakes up in a tribal village somewhere in the African veldt, still recovering from injuries sustained in an accident he cannot remember. When asked for his name by the natives, he does not remember who he is and repeatedly asks himself, "Who Am I?". He is referred to as "Who Am I?" by the natives, as they think it is his name. The tribesmen show him the remains of a crashed helicopter and graves of those who perished aboard. "Who Am I?" spends weeks recuperating from his wounds and learning about the tribe's culture. After spotting rally cars from several miles away, "Who Am I?" bids the village farewell and ventures on a journey back to civilization. He befriends Japanese rally co-driver Yuki after saving her brother from a snake bite and offering to help them finish the race. When they reach Johannesburg, "Who Am I?" meets Christine Stark, a journalist sent to interview him about his rally adventure.

Morgan hears of "Who Am I?" and sends a hitman team to kill him. Morgan also pretends to be his ally, telling him to contact him if he is in danger. After escaping from the hitmen, Christine cracks a secret code written on a matchbook found on one of the dead operatives, which leads them to Rotterdam, in the Netherlands. "Who Am I?" and Christine bid Yuki farewell and head for Rotterdam to find more answers to his identity. In Rotterdam, "Who Am I?" discovers that Christine is actually an undercover CIA agent who tapped his calls. Not knowing whom to trust, he battles Sherman's hitmen and sneaks into the Willemswerf skyscraper alone, where he discovers the masterminds behind the kidnapping of the scientists.

It is revealed that Morgan and General Sherman are about to sell the extraterrestrial compound to an influential arms dealer named Armano. While waiting for the online wire transfer to finish, the three men leave the conference room for a coffee break – giving "Who Am I?" time to sneak in and steal the disc containing the compound information. He also cancels the transaction and transfers the money to Save the Children instead, which infuriates Armano. Sherman and Armano send several men after "Who Am I?" to get the disc back. While in the process of escaping, "Who Am I?" defeats several hitmen and is found by Morgan. Once he discovers Morgan's betrayal, "Who Am I?" tries to kill Morgan, but is interrupted by Morgan's hitmen, who also try to take back the disc. "Who Am I?" fights them off and recovers the disk, but Morgan flees. "Who Am I?" regroups with Christine, who calls for the execution of a "Plan B". Several CIA agents join the pursuit of Morgan, cornering him on the Erasmus Bridge in cooperation with the Royal Netherlands Marine Corps. Christine takes Morgan into custody and asks "Who Am I?" if he has the disc. He throws the disc off the bridge and tells Christine that he will return to Africa.

== Cast ==
- Jackie Chan as Himself / Who Am I?
- Michelle Ferre as Christine Stark
- Mirai Yamamoto as Yuki Ohsato
- Ed Nelson as General Sherman
- Ron Smerczak as CIA Agent Morgan
- David Vlok as Morgan's head assassin
- Mike Ian Lambert as Peter (Morgan's hitman)
- Ron Smoorenburg as Morgan's taekwondo hitman
- Kwan Yung as Morgan's Cai Li Fo hitman
- Yanick Mbali as Baba
- Washington Sixolo as village chief
- Tom Pompert as CIA chairman
- Glory Simon as CIA secretary
- Chip Bray as Armano
- Frank Opperman as Internal security agent

=== Jackie Chan Stunt Team ===
- Andy Cheng
- Rocky Lai
- Nicky Li
- Chan Man Ching
- Sam Wong
- Kwan Yung
- Bradley James Allan
- Paul Andreovski

== Production notes ==
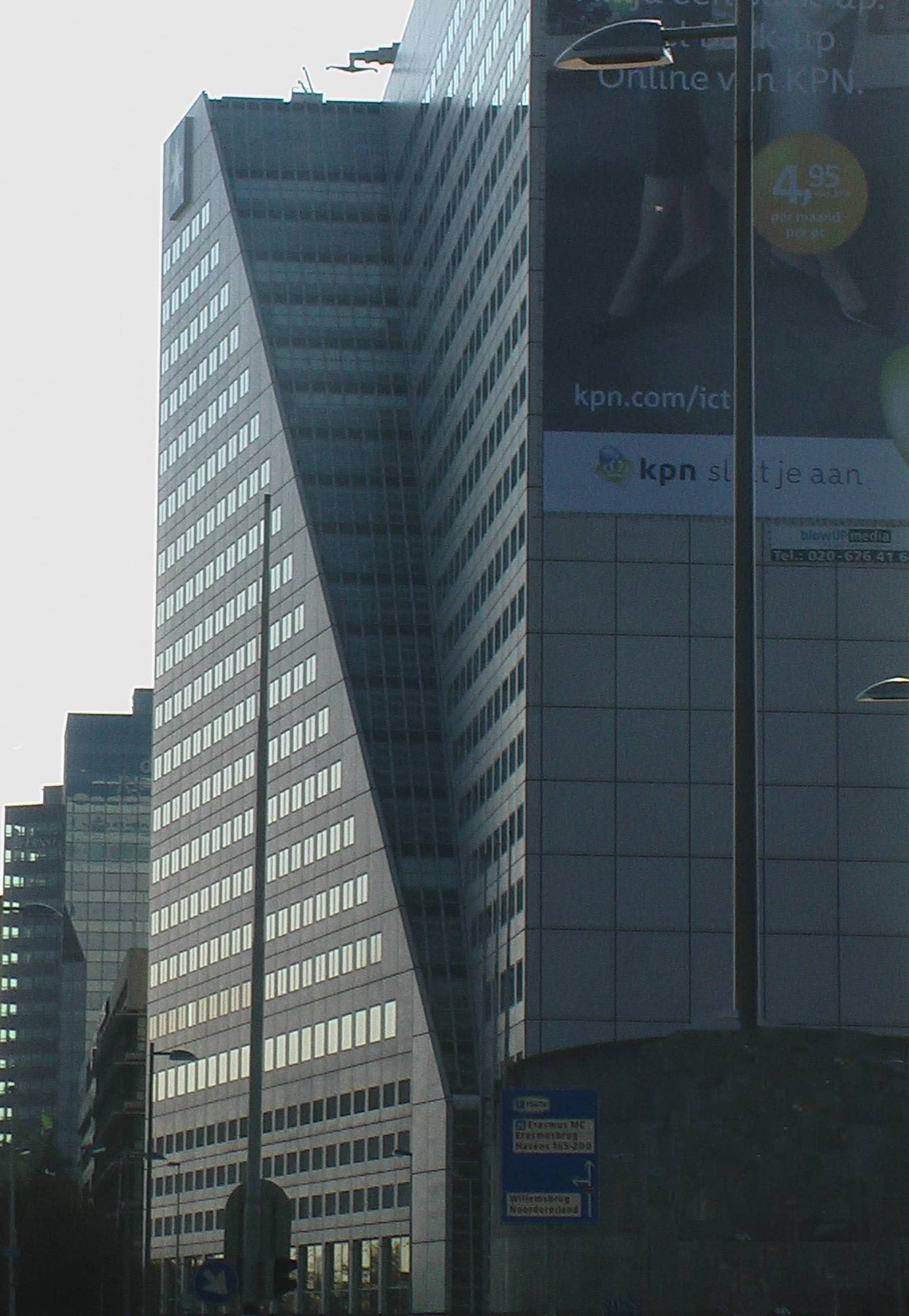
Willemswerf building

Who Am I? was shot on locations in Namibia, South Africa, and Netherlands between February and March 1997. The film features several landmarks such as Sun City in South Africa, Erasmus Bridge in Rotterdam, the Beurstraverse (which was portrayed by the film makers as being in Johannesburg), the Cube houses and the Willemswerf building (which served as the headquarters of the villains and from the side of which, "Who Am I?" escaped by sliding to the ground). Dutch city Dordrecht was also used as a location on the Voorstraat, de Vleeshouwersstraat as well as the fountains by Hans Petri in front of the former Refaja hospital.

The film also features an elaborate chase scene involving the Mitsubishi Lancer Evolution IV GSR and a pack of chasing BMW 3 series (E36), in which Jackie, Yuki, and Christine (in the Evolution) attempt to escape from their captors. Several memorable stunts in the Evolution IV were featured, including a spin parking manoeuvre, market chase, and flipping the car onto its side and roof. In the making-of documentary, the team outlined the numerous Lancer Evolutions that were used for the entire sequence due to the harsh physical challenges presented by the stunts. The use of the Evolution IV was consistent with the then-ongoing presence and sponsorship of Mitsubishi in Jackie Chan's films of that era.

== Box office ==
In Hong Kong, Who Am I? grossed HK$38,852,845 during its theatrical run. In China, it grossed CN¥80 million at the box office. In Taiwan, it sold 155,211 tickets and grossed NT$35,540,820. In South Korea, film sold 193,293 tickets in Seoul City and 579,879 tickets nationwide, grossing US$2.2 million. In Europe, the film sold 157,427 tickets in Germany, and 73,101 tickets in other European countries.

Market	Year	Box office gross revenue		Ticket sales	Ref
Market	Year	Local currency	US dollars	Ticket sales	Ref
Hong Kong	1998	HK$38,852,845	$5,016,291	790,000	
China	1998	CN¥80,000,000	$9,663,000	11,000,000	
Taiwan	1998	NT$35,540,820	$1,092,846	155,211	
South Korea	1998	Unknown	$2,200,000	579,879	
Germany	1998	€866,000 (est.)	$971,000 (est.)	157,427	
Switzerland	1998	€37,000 (est.)	$41,000 (est.)	4,735	
Switzerland	1999	€66,000 (est.)	$74,000 (est.)	8,010	
Netherlands	1999	€219,000 (est.)	$79,000 (est.)	39,135	
Italy	1999	€16,000 (est.)	$17,000 (est.)	3,071	
Total		est. US$19,154,137 (equivalent to $38,000,000 in 2025)		12,737,468 (est.)	

== Reception ==
On Rotten Tomatoes, the film has an approval rating of 70% based on 10 reviews, with an average rating of 6.3/10.

=== Awards and nominations ===
Accolades
Ceremony	Category	Recipient	Outcome
18th Hong Kong Film Awards	Best Film		Nominated
18th Hong Kong Film Awards	Best Actor	Jackie Chan	Nominated
18th Hong Kong Film Awards	Best Editing	Peter Cheung and Chi Wai Yau	Nominated
18th Hong Kong Film Awards	Best Action Choreography	Jackie Chan	Won
18th Hong Kong Film Awards	Best Sound Design		Nominated

== Home media ==
=== United States ===
The U.S. DVD release is cut by 9 minutes with the following changes and omissions:

- Unlike the original HK version of the film, the scene where Jackie Chan and his unit are double-crossed in the helicopter is shown immediately after the helicopters take off. This takes away the "big reveal" effect of what actually happened with Jackie and his men.
- "Who Am I?"'s interaction with the African tribe has been reduced dramatically. Cuts include a scene in which he asks the tribal boy, Baba, how many days it takes to walk to civilization; a scene where he and Baba run away from a lioness after he picks up a lion cub; a scene showing the tribe's farewell ceremony for "Who Am I?"'s journey; and a scene in which he performs an interpretation of the tribal dance.
- The rally race scene has been shortened.
- A scene where "Who Am I?" recovers feeling in his mouth (as he chewed herbal leaves into an anesthetic to cure Yuki's brother's snake bite) and explains his situation to Yuki has been cut.
- All but two instant replay shots (where Yuki, "Who Am I?" and Christine drive through a fruit stand, and where "Who Am I?" narrowly misses falling furniture in Rotterdam) have been deleted.

Unlike other domestic releases of Jackie Chan's films, this version of Who Am I? retains the film's original musical score. Also, the U.S. release is the only cut which contains Jackie Chan's original spoken English during his time with the African tribe. The uncut HK releases have dubbed it in Cantonese.

=== Hong Kong ===
The Hong Kong Universe Laser DVD (now out of print) contains the film as it was originally intended. The "double-cross" scene is not shown until during the interrogation scene as a "revelation flashback." It is meant to be a mystery as to what happened until the viewer sees these flashbacks. It also contains "Who Am I?"'s full interaction with the African tribe. However, his English dialogue during this interaction is dubbed into Cantonese during this part. There are English subtitles provided for the whole film. The presentation is not anamorphic, however.

=== Japan ===
Warner Bros. Japan has released two DVD editions of the film: the single-disc DVD contains the original Hong Kong cut of the film with an anamorphic presentation, but with no English subtitles, and it retains the Cantonese dub of Chan during the African tribe scenes. The two-disc anamorphic edition contains both versions of the film, with English subtitles for the U.S. cut.

== See also ==
- Who Am I 2015, a remake
- Jackie Chan filmography
- List of Hong Kong films
