= Camilla Waldman =

South African actress (born 1968)

- Born: 22 February 1968 (age 57); South Africa
- Education: University of Cape Town
- Occupation: Actress
- Years active: 1995–present
- Spouse: Jamie Bartlett (divorced)
- Children: 1

Camilla Waldman (born 22 February 1968) is a South African actress, best known for her role as Anne de Villiers, the Madam of a high-class brothel, on the SABC1 soapie Generations, from March 2004 to June 2008.

== Career ==
Waldman completed a BA in drama and a Performer's Diploma, graduating cum laude from the University of Cape Town. She then joined the Jazzart Dance Theatre Company and performed with them for two years.

Waldman has appeared in The Fall (2006), Dead Easy (2004) and Berserker.

In 2011, she was cast as Teresa de' Medici in the TV series Leonardo. The first season of Leonardo was shot on location in South Africa throughout the second half of 2010. A second season was completed on location in Cape Town and was aired in 2012. It was announced on 21 January 2013 that Leonardo would not be recommissioned for a third season.

== Personal life ==
She was formerly married to actor Jamie Bartlett. The couple had a son, Hector, and later divorced.

== Filmography ==
Year	Title	Role	Notes
1995	Mystery and Imagination	Morella	
2004	Berserker	Mother	
2004	Dead Easy	Moira	
2006	The Fall	Crying Woman	
2007	Spaarwiel	Mom	Short
2010	Wild at Heart	Hannah	1 episode
2011-2012	Leonardo	Teresa de' Medici	10 episodes
2015	While You Weren't Looking	Terri	
2016	Hanslammers	Rina	
2017	Empire of the Sharks	Captain Ann Aldrin	
2018	Frank & Fearless	Mrs. Manny	
2019	The Hot Zone	Yambuku Nurse	2 episodes
2020	Legacy	Dimitra	11 episodes
2021	Reyka	Maxine	8 episodes
2022	Nandi 2022	Lisa Crowley	
