= Jeff Pillars =

American actor and screenplay writer (born 1958)

Jeff Pillars (born July 13, 1958) is an American actor and screenplay writer. Pillars is originally from Kalamazoo, Michigan. He is a former writer and performer for the breakfast radio program, the John Boy and Billy Big Show in Charlotte, North Carolina which ended in December 2025. His "Ernest" co-star Duke Ernsberger is a Charlotte native.

== Acting filmography ==
=== Movies ===
- Critical Condition (1987) – Correction Officer
- Born to Race (1988) – Kenny's 'Henderson Hardware' Team
- Killer! (1989)
- Mr. Destiny (1990) – Duncan the Tow Truck Driver
- Super Mario Bros. (1993) – Devo Technician
- Ernest Rides Again (1993) – Joe
- Road-Kill U.S.A. (1993) – Harvey
- Bandit: Bandit's Silver Angel (1994) – Deputy Ed
- Radioland Murders (1994) – Nerdy Stagehand
- Bandwagon (1996) – Trumholdt
- Bastard Out of Carolina (1996) – Truck Driver
- This World, Then the Fireworks (1997) – Galloway
- Bloodmoon (1997) – Justice
- Ernest in the Army (1998) – Gen. Rodney Lincoln
- The All New Adventures of Laurel & Hardy: For Love or Mummy (1999) – Biker
- Pirates of the Plain (1999) – DeGroot
- Cold Storage (2006) – Sheriff Bullock

=== Television ===
- The Night of the Hunter (1991) – Mechanic
- In a Child's Name (1991) – Friendly Guard
- The Young Indiana Jones Chronicles
  - Episode – Young Indiana Jones and the Scandal of 1920 (1993) – Tom
- Matlock
  - Episode – The Fortune (1993) – Nick Dempsey
  - Episode – The Verdict (1995) – Rusty Stambler
- Deadly Pursuits (1996) – Delacroix
- The Stepford Husbands (1996) – Gordon
- Twilight Man (1996) – Fat Guy
- A Kiss So Deadly (1996) – Ray
- Any Place But Home (1997) – Melvin the Pig Farmer
- The Almost Perfect Bank Robbery (1997) – Ed Syler
- From the Earth to the Moon (1998, TV mini-series) – Charlie

== Writing filmography ==
- Ernest in the Army (1998) (screenplay)
- The All New Adventures of Laurel and Hardy: For Love or Mummy (1999) (co-wrote screenplay)
