= Thabiso Sikwane =

South African radio and television personality (1974-2024)

Thabiso Sikwane (03 July 1974 – 31 August 2024) was a South African radio and television personality, businesswoman and author. She was formerly the show host of the Kaya 959 radio station's morning show, "Breakfast Show".

Sikwane also had experience working for the Voice of Soweto, SAFM and PowerFM radio stations.

Sikwane had three children. She was once married to DJ Fresh, after meeting him as they worked at radio station YFM during 1996. The pair divorced, but stayed lifelong friends. She was a devout Christian. Sikwane died on 31 August 2024, at the age of 50.
