= V Entertainment =

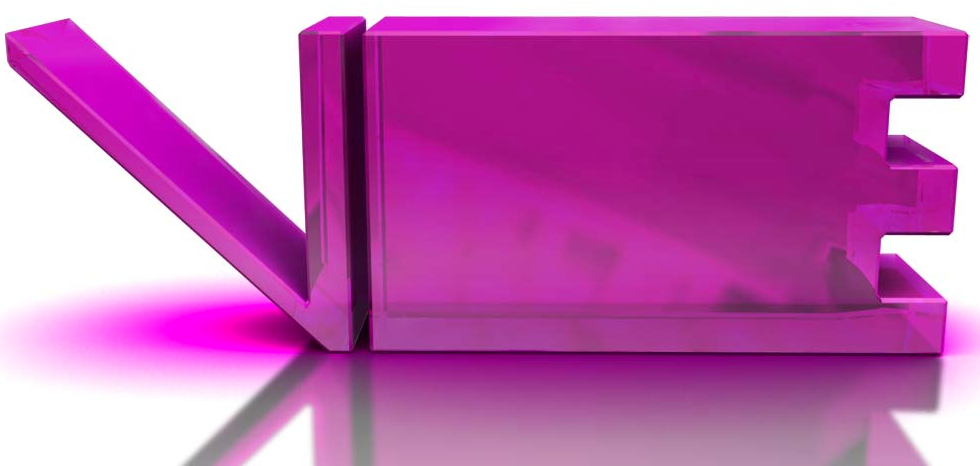
- Presented by: Somizi Mhlongo; Siyabonga Scoop Ngwekazi; Nomuzi Mabena
- Country of origin: South Africa
- No. of episodes: 2000+

Production
- Running time: 30 minutes

Original release
- Network: Vuzu
- Release: September 2011 – June 2017

V Entertainment was an entertainment news series similar to E! News on American Broadcasting Channel E! Entertainment.

== Programme content ==
Developed by M-Net, broadcasting simultaneously on Vuzu and Vuzu Amp (a more premium version of Vuzu) is South Africa's solution to E! News. V Entertainment covers local and international celebrities. The format for V Entertainment is largely based on the format used on E! News although its broadcasts are 30 minutes shorter in a smaller production studio. It broadcasts Mondays to Fridays at 18:00 (CAT) on both Vuzu & Vuzu Amp with a repeat at 23:00 (CAT) on Vuzu and 22:30 (CAT) on Vuzu Amp. It is the channel's flagship show and is broadcast live from the M-Net studios. Also broadcast live are red carpet specials for award shows and concerts mainly the Channel O African Music Video Awards. Some of South Africa's latest music videos also debut on the show exclusively. Despite its overwhelming growth and popularity throughout the years, the show announced its last episode on 29 June 2017, which was aired on 30 June 2017 with a one-hour special.

== Hosts ==
=== Final hosts ===
- Somizi Mhlongo Motaung
- Siyabonga Scoop Ngwekazi
- Nomuzi Mabena

=== Former hosts ===
- Zulu Mkhathini
- Lalla Hirayama
- Dineo Moeketsi Langa
- Denise Zimba
- Shelton Forbes
- Cyprian Ndlovu
- Nonhle Thema
- Thomas Gumede
- Siyabonga Scoop Ngwekazi
- Shane Eagle

=== Other/guest/celeb hosts ===
- Dineo Ranaka
- Anele Mdoda
- Trevor Gumbi
- Somizi Mhlongo
- AKA
- Metiza Kaukuata
- Mika Stefano
- Lerato Sengadi
- Da Les
- Bonang
- Kamo Mphela
- Muesee kahuure
