= Washington Sixolo =

South African actor

- Born: c. 1934; Springs, South Africa
- Died: 4 June 2017 (aged 82–83)
- Occupation: Actor
- Years active: 1934 - 2017

Washington Sixolo (c. 1934 – June 4, 2017), also credited as Washington Xisolo, was a South African film and television actor best known to audiences for his role of Jwara on the long-running SABC 1 television series, Emzini Wezinsizwa. He also co-starred as Bhebhe in the 1986 miniseries, Shaka Zulu, as well as several international films, including Ernest Goes to Africa (1997) and Who Am I? (1998), opposite Jackie Chan.

== Personal life ==
Sixolo was born in Springs on the East Rand, South Africa. He began his professional acting career during the late 1970s. Sixolo was also a founding member of the renowned Kings Messengers Quartet.

== Kings Messengers Quartet ==
Together with three adventist friends; Justice Masinga, Alex Maseko and Joseph Mhlanga, he began this exceptional quartet who was great in the sixties and seventies. Beginning at Bethel College, Butterworth in the former Transkei in the early fifties, Washington Sixolo was the main reason why the Kings Messengers earned great recognition in South Africa and abroad. When hearing the Kings Messengers Quartet sing "No Disappointment in Heaven", former Zambian president, Kenneth Kaunda, could not resist hearing them in person. He arranged a fully paid trip for this world class quartet to sing for him in his presidential suite and elsewhere in Zambia. Sixolo, still part of the quartet took three new members; Norman Dube (1st Tenor), Mike Thlokoane (2nd Tenor) and Gift Makapela (Baritone) with him to sing for Kaunda in 1970.

Sixolo sang up to the mid seventies for the Kings Messengers before joining the SABC on a fulltime basis. The members of the Kings Messengers Quartet in order of appearances were Alex Maseko (1st tenor), Justice Masinga (2nd tenor), Joseph Mhlanga (baritone), Washington Sixolo (bass), Moses Khumalo (1st tenor), Billy Mahlalela (baritone), Norman Dube (1st tenor), Palmer Paul Kote (2nd tenor), Gift Makapela (baritone), Mike Thlokoane (2nd tenor), Stephen Motha (baritone), Vincent Mvelase (2nd tenor), Zolani Sixolo (1st tenor) and Samson Phakhati (bass). The name Kings Messengers was coined by Moses Khumalo after they were only known as "The quartet" for a while.

Sixolo appeared on 7 of the 8 albums the Kings Messengers made over the years. Only on 1 Kings Messengers album in 1983 did Sixolo not feature. Gift Makapela who toured with Sixolo to Zambia to sing for Kaunda was the leader on this album which was the last Kings Messengers album of all time.

Albums that the Kings Messengers made are: Soul of Africa, Precious Moments with the Kings Messengers Quartet, More Songs with the Kings Messengers Quartet, The Best of the Kings Messengers Quartet, Spiritual Revival, Lead Kindly Light and It's Not an Easy Road.

== Death ==
Sixolo, who suffered from several illnesses, became seriously ill on June 3, 2017, while at his home in Orlando West, Soweto. He was taken to Chris Hani Baragwanath Hospital in Soweto, where he died on June 4, 2017, at the age of 83.
