= John Cherry (director) =

American filmmaker (1948–2022)

John Robert Cherry III
- Born: October 11, 1948; Nashville, Tennessee, U.S.
- Died: May 8, 2022 (aged 73)
- Occupations: Director; screenwriter; producer; actor
- Known for: Creating Ernest P. Worrell

John Robert Cherry III (October 11, 1948 – May 8, 2022) was an American film director and screenwriter, most notable for creating the character of Ernest P. Worrell, played by Jim Varney.

== Career ==
A native of Nashville, Tennessee, Cherry attended the Ringling School of Art and Design in Sarasota, Florida.

He was the executive vice president and co-namesake of the Nashville-based Carden and Cherry advertising agency, for which the "Ernest" character was developed. He based the character on a man who worked for his father, about whom Cherry said, that he thought he knew everything but did not know anything.

Ernest was portrayed for 15 years by Jim Varney, who at the time of the character's debut was an up-and-coming stand-up comic; after a string of successful commercials and sketches, Cherry directed a television series (Hey, Vern! It's Ernest) and several movies. Cherry made three cameo appearances in his own films: in Slam Dunk Ernest as a basketball spectator, Ernest Goes to Africa as a customer, and in Ernest in the Army as Sergeant Ben Kovsky. In addition to Varney, Cherry also introduced the comic duo of Chuck and Bobby (Gailard Sartain and Bill Byrge respectively), who were integrated into the Ernest films as supporting characters.

Cherry retired the Ernest character after Varney's declining health made it impossible for him to continue in the role (Varney died of lung cancer in 2000). He directed two other films without Ernest: For Love or Mummy, a collaboration with Larry Harmon that sought to reintroduce the long-deceased Laurel and Hardy comic team with new actors (with Hardy portrayed by Sartain); and Pirates of the Plain, for which Cherry had intended to include Varney but could not.

== Personal life ==
Cherry had three children from two marriages. His son Josh appeared in Ernest in the Army as Corporal Davis.

Cherry was a Christian.

== Death ==
Cherry died from Parkinson's disease on May 8, 2022, aged 73.

== Director ==
- 1983 Hey Vern, It's My Family Album
- 1985 Dr. Otto and the Riddle of the Gloom Beam
- 1986 The Ernest Film Festival (video)
- 1987 Ernest Goes to Camp
- 1987 Hey, Vern, Win $10,000 (video)
- 1988 Ernest Saves Christmas
- 1990 Ernest Goes to Jail
- 1991 Ernest Scared Stupid
- 1993 Ernest Rides Again
- 1995 Slam Dunk Ernest
- 1997 Ernest Goes to Africa
- 1998 Ernest in the Army
- 1999 The All New Adventures of Laurel & Hardy in For Love or Mummy
- 1999 Pirates of the Plain
- 2009 Stake Out (video short)
- 2009 Denton Wants His Mummy (video short)
- 2009 Denton Rose Paranormal Levitation Trick (video short)
- 2011 Denton Rose's Shorts (video)

== Actor ==
- 1997 Ernest Goes to Africa as Customer
- 1998 Ernest in the Army as Sergeant Ben Kovsky
