= Ernest in the Army =

1998 film by John Cherry

- Release poster
- Directed by: John Cherry
- Screenplay by: Jeffrey Pillars; Joseph Dattorre
- Story by: John Cherry
- Produced by: John Cherry; Kenneth M. Badish
- Starring: Jim Varney; Hayley Tyson; David Muller; Christo Davids; Ivan Lucas; Jeffrey Pillars; Duke Ernsberger
- Cinematography: Jimmy Robb
- Edited by: Craig Bassett; Virgilio Da Silva
- Music by: Mark Adler
- Production company: Emshell Producers
- Distributed by: Monarch Home Video; Active Entertainment
- Release date: February 24, 1998
- Running time: 85 minutes
- Country: United States
- Language: English

Ernest in the Army is a 1998 American comedy film, directed by John Cherry and starring Jim Varney. It is the tenth film to feature the character Ernest P. Worrell, the ninth and final film in the Ernest series before Varney's death in February 2000.

It was shot in Cape Town, South Africa's Koeberg Nature Reserve. It was released direct-to-video on February 2, 1998.

The film is initially set in Valdosta, Georgia, where Ernest P. Worrell wishes to drive a big rig. He is persuaded to join the United States Army, by being told that he will get to drive large vehicles and never have to go into actual combat. Instead, Ernest and his unit are deployed to the fictional Middle Eastern country of Karifistan. The American soldiers have to defend the country from an Islamic invasion from the country of Arisia.

== Plot ==
Ernest, working as a golf ball collector at a golf range in Valdosta, Georgia, fantasizes about driving a big rig. His friend, Ben, tells him that if he joins the United States Army, he will get to drive large vehicles and never have to go into actual combat. He enlists in the reserves, but one day, the United Nations peacekeeping commander Pierre Gullet and the British ambassador visit Ernest's camp and demand that the entire unit including him, be deployed to the fictional Middle Eastern country of Karifistan. He and his fellow soldiers are told to assist UN troops in the hope of saving the country from being invaded by an evil Islamic dictator named Tufuti of Arisia.

Ernest finds a lost boy, Ben-Ali and keeps him safe until his father, held in a prison called Sector 32, is found. A news reporter from Ernest's local Channel 3 and the colonel of Ernest's army are taken as hostages and brought to Sector 32, where the news reporter drops a hint on live television, which Ernest recognizes. He journeys to Sector 32 and frees the news reporter and Ben-Ali's father (who was narrating the movie itself), and steals a missile vehicle (carrying a Pluton missile with Colonel Gullet strapped on to it). However, as soon as Ernest releases the colonel, he restrains Ben-Ali and threatens Ernest to give him the missile, but they manage to release the missile, landing in the sand. At the end, the news reporter gets a new job and Ben-Ali is reunited with his father.

== Cast ==
- Jim Varney as Ernest P. Worrell
- Hayley Tyson as Cindy
- David Muller as Colonel Gullet
- Christo Davids as Ben-Ali
- Jeff Pillars as General
- Duke Ernsberger as Barnes
- Ivan Lucas as Tufuti
- John Cherry as Sarge
- Josh Cherry as Corporal Davis

== Release ==
Ernest in the Army was released direct-to-video on February 24, 1998. The film had its first DVD release from Ventura Distribution on October 1, 2002.

== Reception ==
On the review aggregator website Rotten Tomatoes, 17% of 6 critics' reviews are positive, with an average rating of 3.6/10.
