= Pirates of the Plain =

Pirates of The Plain
- DVD cover
- Directed by: John R. Cherry III
- Written by: John R. Cherry III
- Produced by: John R. Cherry III; Kenneth M. Badish
- Starring: Tim Curry; Seth Adkins; Charles Napier; Dee Wallace; Daniel McVicar
- Cinematography: James Robb
- Edited by: Craig Bassett; Virgilio Da Silva
- Music by: Randy Miller
- Distributed by: Promark Entertainment Group
- Release date: 1999
- Running time: 93 minutes
- Country: United States
- Language: English

Pirates of the Plain is a 1999 independent family adventure film, directed and written by John R. Cherry III, and starring Tim Curry and Seth Adkins.

Pirates of the Plain details the adventure of Jezebel Jack (Tim Curry), a pirate that is sent to the future where he meets Bobby (Seth Adkins), a young boy with an overactive imagination.

== Plot ==
Bobby, who lives on a farm in an unspecified area of Nebraska with his mother, Glenna, father Karl, and grandfather, is a typical eight-year-old boy with an overactive imagination. Often receiving punishment for his make-believe adventures, Bobby believes his imagination to be a negative trait. When Bobby's grandfather falls and breaks his arm due to an approaching storm, Bobby is left on the farm alone while his mother accompanies his grandfather to the hospital.

During this storm, a "vortex in time" is created and deposits "Captain" Jezebel Jack, a self-centered pirate who was forced to walk the plank on his own ship and sent into the vortex. Jack awakes in a field of wheat, where he finds Bobby, who tends to his wounds after he loses consciousness again.

While adapting to the advances of modern technology (such as a television), Jack is told of an old buried treasure map by Bobby, and demands they follow the map. Bobby explains that his grandfather explained to him the story, and that the map is written in some unknown code. Jack says that the map is in "Adventurer's Code", in which he is fluent. The two immediately begin to follow the map, and quickly find the treasure buried under an old tool shed.

Shortly after uncovering the treasure, another vortex in time is opened, and the rest of Jack's mutinied crew is deposited. The crew quickly learn of the treasure, and open attack on Jack and Bobby, who are forced to defend the house and the treasure. After Bobby, who has by now become close friends with Jack, is captured and held in ransom, Jack is forced to hand over what is believed to be the treasure. The boy is released, but Jack is forced to stay with the crew, who are teleported back to their native time.

The crew quickly discover that the treasure they received is a counterfeit: bricks covered in aluminum foil. By the time the crew realize that they've been tricked, Jezebel Jack is able to retreat to the murky water, where he is once again deposited to the Nebraska plains.

== Cast ==
- Tim Curry as Jezebel Jack
- Seth Adkins as Bobby
- Dee Wallace as Glenna
- Daniel McVicar as Karl
- Charles Napier as Grandpa
- Jeffrey Buckner Ford as Mr. Skinner

== Production ==
The role of Jezebel Jack was originally written for Jim Varney. Varney had previously worked with Cherry on the Ernest P. Worrell films, and a pirate named Laughing Jack, one of Varney's early characters, had previously appeared in Dr. Otto and the Riddle of the Gloom Beam; his proposed role in Pirates of the Plain was an explicit effort to help distance Varney from his typecasting as Ernest. Varney was unable to perform the role due to lung cancer, from which he died a year later; Curry performed the role in Varney's stead. This was one of only two films Cherry directed that did not feature Ernest (the other being For Love or Mummy, a Laurel and Hardy tribute). Filming took place in Cape Town, South Africa, where the last two Ernest films had also been filmed.

The film crew spent months in Africa's veld, constructing a full-size pirate ship and growing wheat on a hundred acres of land to resemble Nebraska, as the script required that the ship sail across waves of grain. The ship was built on a tractor-trailer frame.
