= Lalla Hirayama =

Japanese and South African Actress, television host and model (born 1988)

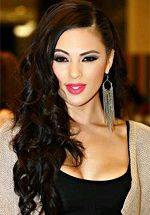
- Hirayama In 2014
- Born: 10 February 1988 (age 38); Hiratsuka, Kanagawa, Japan
- Other name: Ninja
- Citizenship: South Africa
- Education: British International College
- Years active: 2003–present
- Known for: SA's Got Talent Judge; V Entertainment Presenter; Host of M-net's Lalla Land; Good Hope FM DJ

Lalla Hirayama (ララ・平山, Hirayama Lalla; born 10 February 1988) is a Japanese-born South African actress, tv host, dancer and model. Best known for her current work as one of 5 hosts of the live celebrity news show V Entertainment on DStv channel Vuzu as their longest serving host, a judge on South Africa's Got Talent and host of her show Lalla Land on M-net Movies channel.

== Early life ==
Lalla Hirayama was born in Hiratsuka, Kanagawa Prefecture, Japan. She is the only child born to a Japanese mother and a white South African father of Jewish descent. In one interview she said she was brought up in the old school typical Japanese way “think Samurais and Zen”. Her father, although a white Jewish man, is a sangoma (shaman).

Hirayama has previously stated that she comes from a diverse background; Buddhism, Shinto, Judaism, Christianity and other belief systems and cultures. She spent her early years in Japan, then moved to Australia, and finally, at the age of about six to South Africa.

Hirayama started her primary schooling at Fairways Primary School in Sandton, Johannesburg in the Gauteng province of South Africa. While in primary school, she took part in horse riding and athletics and in 1997 became a Junior Horse Riding Champion.

In 2001, she returned to Japan where she taught hip-hop, tap dance and modern dancing in Kagoshima, Kagoshima Prefecture. She returned the next year to South Africa where she registered at the British International College (BIC) in Bryanston, Johannesburg in the Gauteng province of South Africa, for her high school education. While completing her high school education, Hirayama was involved in dance training.

In 2005, she began performing professionally, dancing at corporate functions. A year later, in 2006, Hirayama founded the Clinch City Entertainment (ACC), a hip hop marketing & events company. In that year, she became part of the official dancers for renowned artists of that time, among others; the late Lebo Mathosa of Boom Shaka fame, and Tshwarelo ‘Relo’ Nhlapo; performed with Skwatta Kamp; and was featured in music videos of Unathi Msengana and Loyiso Bala.

== Career ==
She first appeared on South African screens at the age of 15; as a presenter for the daily kids time channel Craz-e on E-TV. After four years, Hirayama was head-hunted to SABC1 as a live continuity presenter and brand ambassador. A year later she played the role of 'Felicia' on E-TV's prime time soapie Rhythm City and as a dark angel on the E-TV show Axe Dark Angels. During this time she also began presenting the show 'Scar Tissue' for the new DSTV channel Vuzu, soon after which she joined the prime time, live celeb gossip show V Entertainment as well as becoming a live continuity presenter for the channel. While on Vuzu, Hirayama played the role of 'Bianca' on the bio-weekly soapie 'Zone 14' on SABC1 and a few months later she joined the 'Tropica Island of Treasure' team and co-hosted the 3rd season, which aired on E-TV alongside DJ Fresh in Phuket, Thailand. She co-hosted the reality hip-hop dance show 'Masters of Rhythm' on Vuzu from mid 2011.

In 2009 Hirayama was featured in the FHM calendar and voted #15 in FHM's 100 Sexiest Women In The World and #14 in 2010. She also featured in the yearly FHM Lingerie supplement in 2010 and is regularly featured in the magazine. She has won Glamour magazines ‘Most Glamorous’ award, ‘Best Innovative Style’ at the South African Style Awards and ‘Most Stylish’ at the G4 Sports awards.

Hirayama has an extremely strong professional dance background. She trained classically from the age of 4 in Ballet, Tap, Modern, Contemporary, Spanish and Jazz. She began teaching in Japan at the age of 14. Whilst in Japan she was exposed to the Hip-Hop scene and after returning to South Africa Hirayama co-founded South Africa's first mix style hip-hop dance crew "Clinch".

== Filmography ==
Show	Role	Season/Episode
V-Entertainment	Herself	Seasons 3–7
Tropika Island of Treasure	Herself	Season 3
The Hustle	Herself	Season 1
The Channel O Africa Music Video Awards	Herself	Seasons 8–9
The AXE Sweet Life	Herself	Season 1
Strictly Come Dancing	Herself	Season 6
ScreenTime with Nicky Greenwall	Herself	Season 4
SA's Got Talent	Herself	Seasons 5–6
Masters of Rhythm	Herself	Season 1
Miss South Africa	Herself	Season 58
Rhythm City	Felicia	Season 1
Craz-e	Herself	Season 10-14
Scar Tissue	Herself	Season 1-2
SABC 1 Continuity	Herself	Season 20-21
DJ on Good Hope FM	Herself	The Full House S1
Lalla Land	Herself	Season 1
Zone14	Bianca	Season 4
Massive Music	Herself	
ISONO	Pretty / Pretty baby	Season 1
