= Tats Nkonzo =

Stand-up comedian and singer

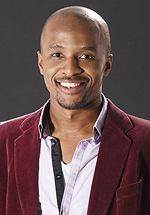
- Born: Mthawelanga Nkonzo; 19 March 1985 (age 40); Mdantsane, South Africa
- Occupations: Comedian; singer; songwriter; television presenter
- Years active: 2005–present
- Comedy career
- Medium: Stand-up; television; music
- Genres: Observational comedy; musical comedy; sketch comedy; blue comedy; satire

Mthawelanga "Tats" Nkonzo (born 19 March 1985) is a South African stand-up comedian, singer, and television personality. He is best known as the host of the e.tv reality competition SA's Got Talent. He was also a co-host on Uyangithanda na?.

== Career ==
Nkonzo is known for his musical segments on the fourth season of the eNCA's satirical news show Late Nite News with Loyiso Gola, in 2012. He was a Top 24 finalist in the third season of the M-Net reality competition Idols, in 2005.

In 2008, Nkonzo got his big break when he made the Top 8 of the SABC1 reality competition So You Think You're Funny!. Once the show ended, he was asked to tour with the Top 3 from the season. Nkonzo performed at Cape Town's Baxter Theatre, Johannesburg's The Market Theatre and the Pieter Torien Theatre (Monte Casino). He was the opening act for Nik Rabinowitz in Nik's one-man shows You Can't Be Serious and Stand and Deliver.

He opened for Loyiso Gola at the Teatro at Monte Casino for Loyiso's one-man show, Life and Times. Based on the content of Nkonzo's material on stage, CNN's African Voices profiled him offering an opportunity to speak about South Africa and how stand-up comedy fits in the bigger picture of nation building.

After three years of stage performances, Nkonzo performed his debut one-man show, Can't Tats This, in his East London home town. He appeared in the first Blacks Only DVD after performing as part of an ensemble line-up at Lyric Theatre.

Nkonzo received the BlackBerry Breakthrough Act Award at the 2nd Annual South African Comics Choice Awards, in 2012. In the same year he took over from Rob van Vuuren and Anele Mdoda as sole host of SA's Got Talent. He was the seventh host of the Comedy Central series Comedy Central Presents... Live at Parker's, in 2012. In 2014, he was one a team captain of the e.tv game show I Love South Africa. In 2015, he was the co-host (with Kenneth Nkosi) of the Mzansi Magic game show Give Me That Bill Mzansi.
