= DJ Fresh (South African DJ) =

South African Motswana DJ

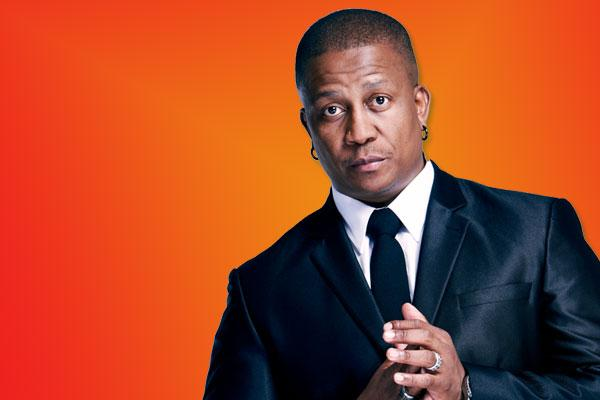
- DJ Fresh during a photoshoot
- Born: Thato Sikwane; 15 October 1972 (age 53); Botswana
- Other names: DJ Fresh; The Big Dawg
- Occupations: DJ; producer; entrepreneur; performer
- Years active: 1990–present
- Spouse: Thabiso Sikwane (m. 2002; sep. 2020)
- Children: 5
- Website: www.djfresh.com

Thato Sikwane (born 15 October 1972), better known by his stage name DJ Fresh, is a Motswana disk jockey, producer and entrepreneur based in Johannesburg, South Africa. He is most well-known for his career on 5FM and Metro FM.

Sikwane known for hosting YFM Radio station in Johannesburg, South Africa. During the 1990s, he released a series of South African house music records, mostly named Fresh House Flava. Different volumes of the compilations were released.

== Life and career ==
Sikwane developed interest on deejaying while he was in Botswana before relocating to South Africa, in 1994 to pursue his studies and obtained a Media Studies diploma at Johannesburg's Boston Media House.

Sikwane obtained the opportunity to work at YFM while he was completing his third year and spent 8 years at the station before moving to 5FM's popular "Drive Time" slot.

He was a radio presenter at 5FM for more than 10 years before moving to Metro FM in 2017, where the "Fresh Breakfast Show" became one of the station's most-loved slots.

In August 2019, Metro FM fired him after a listener complained to the BCCSA about the strong language he used during a live broadcast. Fresh took over 947's Drive Time show, from which he was also fired after being accused of rape.

He has also stepped on television shows such as Idols SA, SA's Got Talent and Tropika Island of Treasure SA as a guest judge.

In 2022, Sikwane started a record label with Zimbabwean born producer/dj, Tich Ponde who goes by the name of Shona SA which focuses mainly on Afro House music, the name of the record label is "Domboshaba Records". Sikwane and Ponde also merged to become "Domboshaba Duo" and have released an album called The Beginning which was released in October 2022 and features artists such as Rock’itMan, Nomvula SA and Audius just to name a few.

In 2023, he released his 13 tracks studio album project titled Voices of Hope 2 Album featuring other top artists like Shona SA, Gouveia, TorQue MuziQ, Starr, Bongiwe Indlovukazi, Mazet SA, Sazi Cele and Thabiso Sikwane.

== Personal life ==
In 2002, Sikwane married Thabiso Sikwane. They had three children together. In 2020, the couple separated and began the divorce process. His former wife Thabiso Sikwane died on Saturday, 31 August 2024, at the age of 50.

== Filmography ==
Television
Year	Title	Role	Notes
2011	Tropika Island of Treasure	Host	Season 3-5
2011-2012	Club Culture	Co-host	
2014	SA's Got Talent	Judge	Season 5-8

== Discography ==
- Definition of House
- Mzansi House
- Fresh House Flava
- DJ Ski VS Big Dawg
- Voices of Hope
- The Beginning
- Voices of Hope 2

== International tour ==
Aside from South Africa, DJ Fresh has toured in these cities worldwide:

- Miami, United States
- London, United Kingdom
- Moscow, Russia
- Dubai, United Arab Emirates
