= Shado Twala =

South African actor

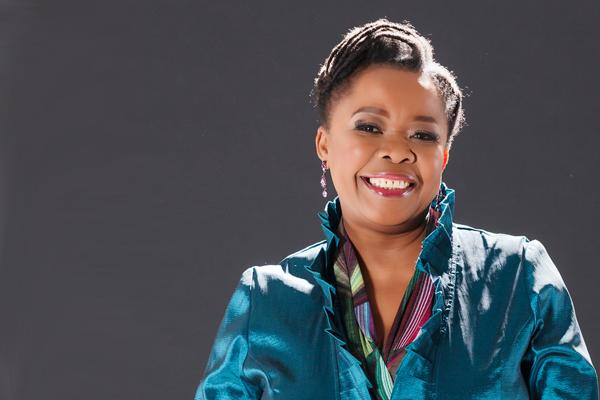
- Born: Nomshado Twala; 10 September 1958 (age 67); Soweto, South Africa
- Other name: 1980s-present
- Occupations: Journalist; Entrepreneur; Consultant; Radio DJ; Television personality; Radio producer; Television producer; Entertainment manager
- Known for: SA's Got Talent (judge); Cape Talk (podcast presenter)
- Children: Vusi Zion (son); Owami Twala (daughter)

Nomshado Twala (born September 10, 1958) professionally known by her stage name Shado Twala is a South African radio DJ, journalist, entrepreneur and radio and television producer best known as a judge on SA's Got Talent.

== Biography ==
Twala was one of three children, in a family in Cape Town. Her first jobs were as a personal assistant to executives at the North West National Parks Board and Jazz Supermarkets. Then in 1989 she first came to public attention in 1989 when she was chosen as the best presenter in a national poll that won her a trip to New York on an exchange programme to learn more about presenting.

She started her career in radio at Bop Radio in the 1980s. Later radio positions include 702 Talk Radio, Radio Metro, P4 Radio, 567 Cape Talk Radio and Heart 104.9FM (which was P4 radio rebranded). During this time, she also wrote articles for the Sunday Times, Two Tone Magazine, Tribute Magazine and the Old Mutual Jazz Heritage Magazine on topics such as democracy, art, and women's issues.

In the 1990s, she established a new company, Khano Entertainment, to nurture local talent and produce music. This company was successful in expanding to other African countries. At the same time, she did public relations work for Ebrahim Rasool, the Premier of the Western Cape. and did voice work for various commercials.

In October 2009, Shado became one of the judges of the e.tv reality competition SA's Got Talent.

In 2011, she joined the MTN Hall of Fame, and is on the judging panel for the Youth Radio Awards and the Mbokodo Awards.

As of 2021, Twala manages her own entertainment business, Black Olive Entertainment. She is also a Public Relations and Media Consultant for Just Mesh Creative Communications.
